= 1934 Wisconsin Senate election =

1934 Wisconsin State Senate election
- November 6, 1934

17 of 33 seats in the Wisconsin State Senate 17 seats needed for a majority
	Majority party	Minority party
Party	Democratic	Progressive
Last election	7 seats, TBD%	N/A
Seats before	9	new party
Seats won	7	8
Seats after	14	13
Seat change	▲5	▲13
Popular vote	140,030	136,749
Percentage	33.31%	32.53%
Swing	TBD pp	TBD pp
	Third party	Fourth party
Party	Republican	Social-Democratic
Last election	9 seats, TBD%	0 seats, (Note: Walter Polakowski was not up for election in 1932) TBD%
Seats before	23	1
Seats won	2	0
Seats after	6	0
Seat change	▼17	▼1
Popular vote	115,632	26,578
Percentage	27.51%	6.32%
Swing	TBD pp	TBD pp
- Results of the elections: Democratic gain Progressive gain Republican hold Republican gain No election
President pro tempore before election
Orland S. Loomis
Republican
Elected President pro tempore
Harry W. Bolens
Democratic

The 1934 Wisconsin Senate election was held on Tuesday, November 6, 1934. Seventeen of the 33 seats in the Wisconsin State Senate were up for election—the odd-numbered districts. Prior to the election 22 seats were held by Republicans, 9 were held by Democrats, one seat was held by a Social-Democrat, and one seat was vacant.

The primary election was held on September 18, 1934.

== Results summary ==
Seats		Party (majority caucus shading)				Total
Seats		Democratic	Social-Democratic	Progressive	Republican	Total
Last election (1932)		7	1	0	9	16
Total after last election (1932)		9	1	0	19	33
Total before this election		9	1	0	23	33
Up for election		2	1	0	14	17
of which:	Incumbent retiring	1			4	4
of which:	Vacated				1	1
This election		7	0	8	2	17
Change from last election		Steady	▼1	▲8	▼1	▼1
Total after this election		14	0	13	6	33
Change in total		▲5	▼1	▲13	▼17	Steady

Popular vote
Democratic	33.31%
Progressive	32.53%
Republican	27.51%
Social-Democratic	6.32%
Independent	0.32%

Senate seats won
Progressive	47.06%
Democratic	41.17%
Republican	11.76%

=== Close races ===
- State Senate district 25, 1.42% (gain)
- State Senate district 13, 1.72% (gain)
- State Senate district 19, 1.91% (gain)
- State Senate district 15, 3.33% (gain)
- State Senate district 11, 7.17%
- State Senate district 9, 8.92% (gain)
- State Senate district 17, 9.30% (gain)
- State Senate district 27, 9.39% (gain)

== Outgoing incumbents ==
=== Retiring ===
- Walter S. Goodland (R–Racine), representing district 21 since 1926, declined to seek re-election
- Leonard Fons (R–Milwaukee), representing District 7 since 1930, declined to seek re-election.
- William H. Edwards (R–Sussex), representing District 33 since 1930, declined to seek re-election.

=== Seeking other office ===
- Eugene A. Clifford (D–Juneau), representing District 13 since 1930, instead ran for Congress from Wisconsin's 8th congressional district.
- Orland Steen Loomis (R–Mauston) representing District 31 since 1930, instead ran for Wisconsin Attorney General as a Progressive.

=== Vacated office ===
- Merritt F. White (R–Winneconne), representing District 19 since 1922, died on July 28, 1934.

== Special elections ==
There was one special election scheduled in 1934 for the Wisconsin state Senate.

Dist.	Previous Incumbent				This Election	
Dist.	Senator	Party	First elected	Status	Candidate(s)	Results
26	Alvin C. Reis	Rep.	1932	Incumbent resigned in July, 1934. New member elected on November 6, 1934.	▌Harold Groves (Prog.) 47.72%; ▌Fred T. Finn (Rep.) 32.33%; ▌Frank A. Stewart (Dem.) 18.73%; ▌Dalton T. Clarke (SD) 0.12%	New member elected Progressive gain

== Candidates and results ==
Dist.	Incumbent				This race
Dist.	Member	Party	First elected	Status	General
01	John E. Cashman	Republican	1922	Incumbent re-elected. Progressive gain.	▌ ✓ John E. Cashman (Prog.) 50.20%; ▌Ray J. Scheuer (Dem.) 30.51%; ▌Alvin E. O'Konski (Rep.) 19.29%
03	None (open seat)			No incumbent New member elected. Democratic gain.	▌ ✓ Arthur L. Zimny (Dem.) 40.83%; ▌George L. Tews (SD) 26.71%; ▌ H. C.Schultz (Prog.) 20.92%; ▌ Carl Lester (Ind.) 5.97%; ▌ William B. Manning (Rep.) 5.57%
05	Bernhard Gettelman	Republican	1922	Incumbent lost re-election New member elected. Democratic gain.	▌ ✓ Harold V. Schoenecker (Dem.) 35.39%; ▌Bernhard Gettelman (Rep.) 23.46%; ▌Carl Minkley (SD) 21.9%; ▌Gustave A. Dick (Prog.) 19.24%
07	Leonard Fons	Republican	1930	Incumbent retired New member elected. Democratic gain.	▌ ✓ Max Galasinski (Dem.) 43.59%; ▌Walter Polakowski (SD) 27.78%; ▌Edwarf R. Buer (Prog.) 16.82%; ▌Herbert W. Koch (Rep.) 11.81%
07	Walter Polakowski (Redistricted from the 3rd district)	Social-Democratic	1922	Incumbent defeated. Social-Democratic loss	▌ ✓ Max Galasinski (Dem.) 43.59%; ▌Walter Polakowski (SD) 27.78%; ▌Edwarf R. Buer (Prog.) 16.82%; ▌Herbert W. Koch (Rep.) 11.81%
09	Irving P. Mehigan	Republican	1924	Incumbent lost re-election New member elected. Democratic gain.	▌ ✓ James L. Callan (Dem.) 38.76%; ▌Irving P. Mehigan (Rep.) 29.84%; ▌Robert McCarthy (Prog.) 16.73%; ▌Gustave A. Dick (SD) 13.78%; ▌Mary Allen (Ind.) 0.89%
11	Philip Nelson	Republican	1930	Incumbent re-elected	▌ ✓ Philip E. Nelson (Rep.) 42.79%; ▌Albert N. Young (Prog.) 35.62%; ▌Laverne A. Sutfin (Dem.) 20.00%; ▌Carrol T. Hodsdon (SD) 1.59%
13	Eugene A. Clifford	Democratic	1930	Ran for U.S. House; New member elected. Progressive gain.	▌ ✓ Frank E. Panzer (Prog.) 39.83%; ▌Paul A. Hemmy Jr. (Dem.) 38.11%; ▌Jesse M. Peters (Rep.) 20.07%; ▌Alfred A. Naber (SD) 1.99%
15	Alexander Paul	Democratic	1933 (special)	Incumbent lost re-election New member elected. Republican gain.	▌ ✓ Maurice Coakley (Rep.) 38.31%; ▌Alexander Paul (Dem.) 34.98%; ▌George S. Geffs (Prog.) 26.71%
17	George Engebretson	Republican	1932 (special)	Incumbent re-elected. Progressive gain.	▌ ✓ George Engebretson (Prog.) 44.74%; ▌Floyd E. Olson (Rep.) 35.44%; ▌Leland C. White (Dem.) 19.80%
19	--Vacant (Note: Merritt F. White (R) died on July 28, 1934)--			Previous incumbent died July 28, 1934; New member elected. Democratic gain.	▌ ✓ Pierce A. Morrissey (Dem.) 35.00%; ▌Norton J. Williams (Rep.) 33.09%; ▌Charles P. Potratz (Prog.) 31.91%
21	Walter S. Goodland	Republican	1926	Incumbent retired New member elected. Democratic gain.	▌ ✓ Joseph Clancy (Dem.) 40.80%; ▌Thorwald M. Beck (Rep.) 28.50%; ▌Peden Back (Prog.) 26.27%; ▌Lars P. Christiansen (SD) 4.43%
23	Herman J. Severson	Republican	1918	Incumbent re-elected. Progressive gain.	▌ ✓ Herman J. Severson (Prog.) 38.33%; ▌Michael J. Mersch (Dem.) 36.91%; ▌John S. Hensel (Rep.) 24.72%
25	Otto Mueller	Republican	1926	Incumbent lost re-election New member elected. Progressive gain.	▌ ✓ Roland E. Kannenberg (Prog.) 35.17%; ▌Otto Mueller (Rep.) 32.03%; ▌Arthur J. Plowman (Dem.) 28.86%; ▌Fred Pike (SD) 3.94%
27	Fred W. Zantow	Republican	1930	Incumbent re-elected. Progressive gain.	▌ ✓ Fred W. Zantow (Prog.) 41.42%; ▌Harry Pauls (Rep.) 32.03%; ▌Isaac C. Evans (Dem.) 26.55%
29	John A. Anderson	Republican	1930	Incumbent re-elected. Progressive gain.	▌ ✓ John Anderson (Prog.) 46.13%; ▌Herschel Shipley (Rep.) 22.67%; ▌Joseph H. Wallis (Dem.) 19.50%; ▌Olaf A. Bloom (SD) 11.69%
31	Orland S. Loomis	Republican	1930	Incumbent ran for Attorney General; New member elected. Progressive gain.	▌ ✓ J. Earl Leverich (Prog.) 49.59%; ▌Kevin J. Callahan (Rep.) 25.59%; ▌Timothy P. Donovan (Dem.) 23.85%; ▌Glen C. Felker (SD) 0.96%
33	William Edwards	Republican	1930	Incumbent retired New member elected. Democratic gain.	▌ ✓ Chester Dempsey (Dem.) 41.71%; ▌Evan G. Davies (Rep.) 30.19%; ▌John C. Schumann (Prog.) 28.09%

== Detailed results ==
=== District 1 ===
Incumbent Republican John E. Cashman ran for re-election as a Progressive. He defeated Democrat Ray J. Scheuer and Republican Alvin O'Konski in the general election.

District 1 general election
Party	Candidate	Votes	%
Progressive	John E. Cashman (incumbent)	14,072	50.20
Democratic	Ray J. Scheuer	8,552	30.51
Republican	Alvin O'Konski	5,410	19.29
Total votes		28,034	100.0

=== District 3 ===
Incumbent Social-Democrat Walter Polakowski was moved into the 7th district due to redistricting, leaving this district open. Democrat Arthur L. Zimny defeated Social-Democrat George L. Tews, Progressive H. C. Schultz, Independent Carl Lester, and Republican William B. Manning.

District 3 general election
Party	Candidate	Votes	%
Democratic	Arthur L. Zimny	8,277	40.83
Social-Democratic	George L. Tews	5,415	26.71
Progressive	H. C.Schultz	4,241	20.92
Independent	Carl Lester	1,210	5.97
Republican	William B. Manning	1,130	5.57
Total votes		20,273	100.0

=== District 5 ===
Incumbent Republican Bernhard Gettelman ran for re-election. He was defeated by Democrat Harold V. Schoenecker.

District 5 general election
Party	Candidate	Votes	%
Democratic	Harold V. Schoenecker	10,435	35.39
Republican	Bernhard Gettelman (incumbent)	6,916	23.46
Social-Democratic	Carl Minkley	6,458	21.91
Progressive	Gustave A. Dick	5,674	19.24
Total votes		29,483	100.0

=== District 7 ===
Incumbent Republican Leonard Fons declined to seek re-election, leaving the district open. Democrat Max Galasinski defeated Social-Democrat Walter Polakowski – who had been moved into this district due to redistricting – as well as Progressive Edwarf R. Buer and Republican Herbert W. Koch.

District 7 general election
Party	Candidate	Votes	%
Democratic	Max Galasinski	11,444	43.59
Social-Democratic	Walter Polakowski	7,292	27.78
Progressive	Edwarf R. Buer	4,416	16.82
Republican	Herbert W. Koch	3,100	11.81
Total votes		26,252	100.0

=== District 9 ===
Incumbent Republican Irving P. Mehigan ran for re-election. He was defeated by Democrat James L. Callan.

District 9 general election
Party	Candidate	Votes	%
Democratic	James L. Callan	6,501	38.76
Republican	Irving P. Mehigan (incumbent)	5,005	29.84
Progressive	Robert McCarthy	2,805	16.73
Social-Democratic	Gustave A. Dick	2,311	13.78
Independent	Mary Allen	149	0.89
Total votes		16,771	100.0

=== District 11 ===
Incumbent Republican Philip Nelson ran for re-election. He defeated Progressive Albert N. Young, Democrat Laverne A. Sutfin, and Social-Democrat Carrol T. Hodsdon.

District 11 general election
Party	Candidate	Votes	%
Republican	Philip Nelson (incumbent)	12,125	42.79
Progressive	Albert N. Young	10,094	35.62
Democratic	Laverne A. Sutfin	5,667	20.00
Social-Democratic	Carrol T. Hodsdon	449	1.59
Total votes		28,335	100.0

=== District 13 ===
Incumbent Democrat Eugene A. Clifford declined to seek re-election, instead unsuccessfully running for Congress from Wisconsin's 8th congressional district. Progressive Frank E. Panzer defeated Democrat Paul A. Hemmy Jr., Republican Jesse M. Peters, and Social-Democrat Alfred A. Naber.

District 13 general election
Party	Candidate	Votes	%
Progressive	Frank E. Panzer	10,545	39.83
Democratic	Paul A. Hemmy Jr.	10,089	38.11
Republican	Jesse M. Peters	5,313	20.07
Social-Democratic	Alfred A. Naber	528	1.99
Total votes		26,475	100.0

=== District 15 ===
Incumbent Democrat Alexander Paul ran for re-election. He was defeated by Republican Maurice Coakley.

District 15 general election
Party	Candidate	Votes	%
Republican	Maurice Coakley	8,847	38.31
Democratic	Alexander Paul (incumbent)	8,076	34.98
Progressive	George S. Geffs	6,168	26.71
Total votes		23,091	100.0

=== District 17 ===
Incumbent Republican George Engebretson ran for re-election as a Progressive. He defeated Republican Floyd E. Olson and Democrat Leland C. White.

District 2 general election
Party	Candidate	Votes	%
Progressive	George Engebretson (incumbent)	9,292	44.74
Republican	Floyd E. Olson	7,360	35.44
Democratic	Leland C. White	4,111	19.80
Write-in		4	0.02
Total votes		20,767	100.0

=== District 19 ===
Incumbent Republican Merritt F. White died on July 28, 1934, leaving the district open. Democrat Pierce A. Morrissey defeated Republican Norton J. Williams and Progressive Charles P. Potratz.

=== District 21 ===
Incumbent Republican Walter S. Goodland declined to seek re-election, leaving the district open. Democrat Joseph Clancy defeated Republican Thorwald M. Beck, Progressive Peden Back, and Social-Democrat Lars P. Christiansen.

=== District 23 ===
Incumbent Republican Herman J. Severson ran for re-election as a Progressive. He defeated Democrat Michael J. Mersch and Republican John S. Hensel.

District 23 general election
Party	Candidate	Votes	%
Progressive	Herman J. Severson (incumbent)	8,583	38.33
Democratic	Michael J. Mersch	8,267	36.91
Republican	John S. Hensel	5,537	24.72
Write-in		10	0.04
Total votes		22,397	100.0

=== District 25 ===
Incumbent Republican Otto Mueller ran for re-election. He was defeated by Progressive Roland E. Kannenberg.

=== District 27 ===
Incumbent Republican Fred W. Zantow ran for re-election as a Progressive. He defeated Republican Harry Pauls and Democrat Isaac C. Evans.

=== District 29 ===
Republican John A. Anderson ran for re-election as a Progressive. He defeated Republican Herschel Shipley, Democrat Joseph H. Wallis, and Social-Democrat Olaf A. Bloom.

District 29 general election
Party	Candidate	Votes	%
Progressive	John Anderson (incumbent)	11,431	46.13
Republican	Herschel Shipley	5,617	22.67
Democratic	Joseph H. Wallis	4,832	19.50
Social-Democratic	Olaf A. Bloom	2,898	11.69
Write-in		2	0.01
Total votes		24,780	100.0

=== District 31 ===
Republican Orland S. Loomis declined to seek re-election, instead unsuccessfully running for Wisconsin Attorney General as a Progressive, leaving this district open. Progressive J. Earl Leverich defeated Republican Kevin J. Callahan, Democrat Timothy P. Donovan, and Social-Democrat Glen C. Felker.

=== District 33 ===
Incumbent Republican William Edwards declined to seek re-election, leaving this seat open. Democrat Chester Dempsey defeated Republican Evan G. Davies and Progressive John C. Schumann.

== See also ==
- 1934 Wisconsin elections
  - 1934 Wisconsin State Assembly election
- 1934 United States elections
- Elections in Wisconsin
- Wisconsin Senate
