= 61st Wisconsin Legislature =

Wisconsin legislative term for 1933–1934

←	60th	62nd	→
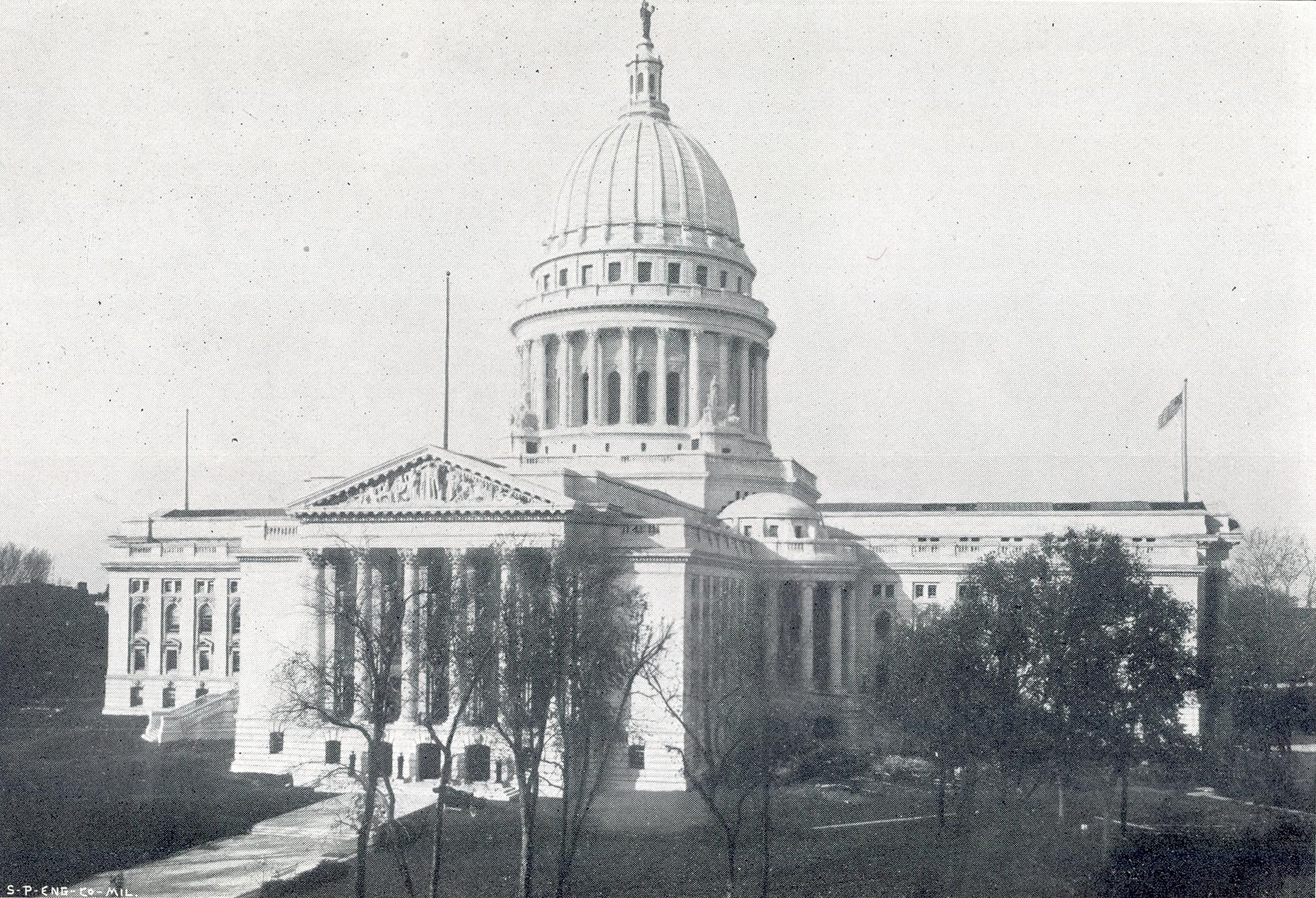
- Wisconsin State Capitol ca.1915

Overview
- Legislative body: Wisconsin Legislature
- Meeting place: Wisconsin State Capitol
- Term: January 2, 1933 – January 7, 1935
- Election: November 8, 1932

Senate
- Members: 33
- Senate President: Thomas J. O'Malley (D)
- President pro tempore: Orland S. Loomis (R)
- Party control: Republican

Assembly
- Members: 100
- Assembly Speaker: Cornelius T. Young (D)
- Party control: Democratic

Sessions
- Regular: January 11, 1933 – July 25, 1933

Special sessions
- Dec. 1933 Spec.: December 11, 1933 – February 3, 1934

The Sixty-First Wisconsin Legislature convened from January 11, 1933, to July 25, 1933, in regular session, and reconvened in a special session from December 11, 1933, to February 3, 1934.

This was the first legislative term after the redistricting of the Senate and Assembly according to an act of the previous session—although there are barely any changes from the previous map. This was also the first legislative term since 1893–1894 in which the Democratic Party of Wisconsin held a majority of one of the chambers. This session also coincided with the formal schism of the Wisconsin Progressive Party from the Republican Party of Wisconsin. It was the beginning of a major political realignment in the state.

Senators representing even-numbered districts were newly elected for this session and were serving the first two years of a four-year term. Assembly members were elected to a two-year term. Assembly members and even-numbered senators were elected in the general election of November 8, 1932. Senators representing odd-numbered districts were serving the third and fourth year of a four-year term, having been elected in the general election of November 4, 1930.

The governor of Wisconsin during this entire term was Democrat Albert G. Schmedeman, of Dane County, serving a two-year term, having won election in the 1932 Wisconsin gubernatorial election.

== Major events ==
- January 2, 1933: Inauguration of Albert G. Schmedeman as the 28th Governor of Wisconsin. The first Democratic governor of Wisconsin in 38 years.
- January 23, 1933: The Twentieth Amendment to the United States Constitution, moving the start of the congressional terms from March to January and moving the presidentual inauguration to January 20, was ratified by the requisite number of states to come into force.
- January 30, 1933: Adolf Hitler was appointed Chancellor of Germany by German president Paul von Hindenburg.
- February 15, 1933: Giuseppe Zangara attempted to assassinate U.S. president-elect Franklin D. Roosevelt in Miami, but missed and killed Chicago mayor Anton Cermak.
- February 20, 1933: The United States Congress passed the Blaine Act, named for Wisconsin's outgoing United States senator John J. Blaine, referring to the states the Twenty-first Amendment to the United States Constitution to repeal the Eighteenth Amendment (Prohibition).
- February 27, 1933: The German Reichstag building burned.
- March 4, 1933: Inauguration of Franklin D. Roosevelt as the 32nd President of the United States.
- March 27, 1933: The Empire of Japan announced it would withdraw from the League of Nations.
- April 5, 1933: U.S. President Franklin Roosevelt established the Civilian Conservation Corps by executive order, utilizing the recently passed Emergency Conservation Work Act.
- May 27, 1933: U.S. President Franklin Roosevelt signed into law the Securities Act of 1933, establishing critical new regulation of securities trading.
- June 16, 1933: U.S. President Franklin Roosevelt signed into law the National Industrial Recovery Act of 1933.
- June 21, 1933: The Nazi government in Germany outlawed all other political parties.
- October 10, 1933: A bomb destroyed United Air Lines Trip 23 in air near Chesterton, Indiana. It was the first proven case of sabotage in civil aviation, no perpetrator was ever identified.
- October 14, 1933: Nazi Germany announced it would withdraw from the League of Nations.
- October 17, 1933: Albert Einstein arrived in the United States as a refugee from Nazi Germany.
- November 16, 1933: The United States and the Soviet Union established formal diplomatic relations.
- December 5, 1933: The Twenty-first Amendment to the United States Constitution, repealing the language allowing prohibition of alcohol, was ratified by the requisite number of states to come into force.
- January 30, 1934: U.S. President Franklin Roosevelt signed into law the Gold Reserve Act, nationalizing the gold supply in order to stabilize currency value.
- April 15, 1934: Wisconsin Supreme Court justice Walter C. Owen died in office.
- May 19, 1934: At a convention in Fond du Lac, Wisconsin, the Wisconsin Progressive Party was established.
- August 2, 1934: German president Paul von Hindenburg died of lung cancer. Due to a law passed the previous day, the office of president was abolished and its powers passed to the chancellor of Germany, Adolf Hitler, under the new title Führer und Reichskanzler.
- November 6, 1934: 1934 United States general election:
  - Philip La Follette (P) elected Governor of Wisconsin.
  - Robert M. La Follette Jr. (P) re-elected United States senator from Wisconsin.
  - Wisconsin voters ratified an amendment to the state constitution making technical changes to the section on suffrage, eliminating references to gender.
- November 15, 1934: Wisconsin governor Albert G. Schmedeman appointed Theodore G. Lewis to the Wisconsin Supreme Court to succeed the deceased justice Walter C. Owen.
- November 20, 1934: Retired U.S. Marine Corps general Smedley Butler revealed to Congress a conspiracy of several wealthy businessmen to initiate a fascist coup in the United States.
- December 5, 1934: Recently appointed Wisconsin Supreme Court justice Theodore G. Lewis died in office.
- December 29, 1934: Japan renounced the Washington Naval Treaty and London Naval Treaty, which had set limits on naval warships.
- December 31, 1934: Wisconsin governor Albert G. Schmedeman appointed Joseph Martin to the Wisconsin Supreme Court to succeed the deceased justice Theodore G. Lewis.

== Major legislation ==
- January 28, 1933: Joint Resolution ratifying an amendment to the Constitution of the United States fixing the commencement of the terms of President and Vice President and Members of Congress and fixing the time of the assembling of Congress, 1933 Joint Resolution 5. Wisconsin's ratification of the Twentieth Amendment to the United States Constitution.
- May 4, 1933: Joint Resolution to amend section 11 of article XIII of the constitution relating to free passes, 1933 Joint Resolution 63. First legislative passage of a proposed amendment to the state constitution to create exceptions to the prohibition on free passes for candidates where they are earning less than $300 of income and would otherwise receive such passes from their employer. This amendment was eventually ratified by voters at the November 1936 election.
- June 8, 1933: Joint Resolution to amend section 1 of Article III of the constitution, relating to suffrage, to eliminate obsolete provisions and to submit this amendment to a vote of the people at the general election in November 1934, 1933 Joint Resolution 76. Second legislative passage of a proposed amendment to the state constitution to make technical fixes to the section on suffrage, eliminating references to gender. This amendment was ratified by voters at the November 1934 election.

== Party summary ==
=== Senate summary ===
Senate partisan composition Democratic: 9 seats Socialist: 1 seat Republican: 23 seats

	Party (Shading indicates majority caucus)				Total	
	Dem.	Soc.	Prog.	Rep.	Total	Vacant
End of previous Legislature	1	2	0	29	32	1
Start of Reg. Session	9	1	0	23	33	0
From July 28, 1934 (Note: Republican Merritt F. White (19th District) died.)	9	1	0	22	32	1
From Nov. 14, 1934 (Note: Republican Fred W. Zantow (27th District) died.)	9	1	0	21	31	2
Final voting share	32.26%			67.74%		
Beginning of the next Legislature	14	0	13	6	33	0

=== Assembly summary ===
Assembly partisan composition Democratic: 59 seats Socialist: 3 seats Republican: 38 seats

	Party (Shading indicates majority caucus)				Total	
	Dem.	Soc.	Prog.	Rep.	Total	Vacant
End of previous Legislature	3	9	0	84	96	4
Start of Reg. Session	59	3	0	38	100	0
From Jan. 28, 1934 (Note: Democrat Walter G. Caldwell (Waukesha County) died.)	58	3	0	38	99	1
Final voting share	58.59%	41.41%				
Beginning of the next Legislature	35	3	45	17	100	0

== Sessions ==
- Regular session: January 11, 1933 – July 25, 1933
- December 1933 special session: December 11, 1933 – February 3, 1934

== Leaders ==
=== Senate leadership ===
- President of the Senate: Thomas J. O'Malley (D)
- President pro tempore: Orland S. Loomis (R–Mauston)

=== Assembly leadership ===
- Speaker of the Assembly: Cornelius T. Young (D–Milwaukee)

== Members ==
=== Members of the Senate ===
Members of the Senate for the Sixty-First Wisconsin Legislature:

Senate partisan representation Democratic: 9 seats Socialist: 1 seat Republican: 23 seats

Dist.	Counties	Senator	Residence	Party
01	Door, Kewaunee, & Manitowoc	John E. Cashman	Denmark	Rep.
02	Brown & Oconto	E. F. Brunette	Green Bay	Dem.
03	Milwaukee (South City)	Walter Polakowski	Milwaukee	Soc.
04	Milwaukee (Northeast County & Northeast City)	Oscar Morris	Milwaukee	Rep.
05	Milwaukee (Northwest City)	Bernhard Gettelman	Milwaukee	Rep.
06	Milwaukee (North-Central City)	Charles H. Phillips	Milwaukee	Dem.
07	Milwaukee (Southeast County & Southeast City)	Leonard Fons	Milwaukee	Rep.
08	Milwaukee (Western County)	William Shenners Jr.	West Allis	Dem.
09	Milwaukee (City Downtown)	Irving P. Mehigan	Milwaukee	Rep.
10	Buffalo, Pepin, Pierce, & St. Croix	Walter H. Hunt	River Falls	Rep.
11	Bayfield, Burnett, Douglas, & Washburn	Philip E. Nelson	Maple	Rep.
12	Ashland, Iron, Price, Rusk, Sawyer, & Vilas	Bernard J. Gehrmann	Mellen	Rep.
13	Dodge & Washington	Eugene A. Clifford	Juneau	Dem.
14	Outagamie & Shawano	Mike Mack	Shiocton	Rep.
15	Rock	Alexander Paul	Milton	Dem.
16	Crawford, Grant, & Vernon	William D. Carroll	Prairie du Chien	Dem.
17	Green, Iowa, & Lafayette	George Engebretson	South Wayne	Rep.
18	Fond du Lac, Green Lake & Waushara	Morley G. Kelly	Fond du Lac	Dem.
19	Calumet & Winnebago	Merritt F. White	Winneconne	Rep.
20	Ozaukee & Sheboygan	Harry W. Bolens	Port Washington	Dem.
21	Racine	Walter S. Goodland	Racine	Rep.
22	Kenosha & Walworth	Conrad Shearer	Kenosha	Rep.
23	Portage & Waupaca	Herman J. Severson	Iola	Prog.Rep.
24	Clark, Taylor, & Wood	Walter J. Rush	Neillsville	Rep.
25	Lincoln & Marathon	Otto Mueller	Wausau	Rep.
26	Dane	Alvin C. Reis	Madison	Rep.
27	Columbia, Richland, & Sauk	Fred W. Zantow	Baraboo	Rep.
28	Chippewa & Eau Claire	G. Erle Ingram	Eau Claire	Prog.Rep.
29	Barron, Dunn, & Polk	John A. Anderson	Barron	Rep.
30	Florence, Forest, Langlade, Marinette, & Oneida	Sherman W. Wade	Antigo	Dem.
31	Adams, Juneau, Monroe, & Marquette	Orland S. Loomis	Mauston	Rep.
32	Jackson, La Crosse, & Trempealeau	Harry W. Griswold	West Salem	Rep.
33	Jefferson & Waukesha	William H. Edwards	Sussex	Rep.

=== Members of the Assembly ===
Members of the Assembly for the Sixty-First Wisconsin Legislature:

Assembly partisan composition Democratic: 59 seats Socialist: 3 seats Republican: 38 seats

Milwaukee County districts

Senate Dist.	County	Dist.	Representative	Party	Residence
31	Adams & Marquette		K. J. Callahan	Rep.	Montello
12	Ashland		Clarence V. Olson	Prog.Rep.	Ashland
29	Barron		Warren D. Leary	Dem.	Rice Lake
11	Bayfield		Robert A. Nixon	Prog.Rep.	Washburn
02	Brown	1	Robert E. Lynch	Dem.	Green Bay
02	Brown	2	William J. Sweeney	Dem.	De Pere
10	Buffalo & Pepin		Arthur A. Hitt	Prog.Rep.	Alma
11	Burnett & Washburn		Lou J. Thompson	Dem.	Spooner
19	Calumet		Jerome F. Fox	Dem.	Chilton
28	Chippewa		John E. Prince	Rep.	Anson
24	Clark		James E. Lyons	Dem.	Colby
27	Columbia		E. Myrwyn Rowlands	Rep.	Cambria
16	Crawford		Thorleif A. Peterson	Dem.	Soldiers Grove
26	Dane	1	Francis Lamb	Rep.	Madison
26	Dane	2	James C. Hanson	Rep.	Deerfield
26	Dane	3	Albert J. Baker	Rep.	Mount Horeb
13	Dodge	1	Lorenz Becker	Dem.	Woodland
13	Dodge	2	Henry E. Krueger	Dem.	Beaver Dam
01	Door		William H. Moore	Prog.Rep.	Sawyer
11	Douglas	1	Maurice Weinberg	Dem.	Superior
11	Douglas	2	Joseph Westlund	Rep.	Superior
29	Dunn		Willis E. Donley	Dem.	Menomonie
28	Eau Claire		John T. Pritchard	Rep.	Eau Claire
30	Florence, Forest, & Oneida		Neil McEachin	Dem.	Rhinelander
18	Fond du Lac	1	Maurice J. Fitzsimons Jr.	Dem.	Fond du Lac
18	Fond du Lac	2	Joseph H. Hardgrove	Dem.	Eden
16	Grant	1	Bert A. Clemens	Rep.	Cuba City
16	Grant	2	Hugh A. Harper	Rep.	Lancaster
17	Green		Ernst J. Hoesly	Prog.Rep.	New Glarus
18	Green Lake & Waushara		Alex McDonald	Dem.	Markesan
17	Iowa		John S. Jackson	Rep.	Mineral Point
12	Iron & Vilas		Paul Alfonsi	Prog.Rep.	Pence
32	Jackson		William F. Dettinger	Prog.Rep.	Hixton
33	Jefferson		Palmer F. Daugs	Dem.	Fort Atkinson
31	Juneau		John P. Conway	Rep.	Hustler
22	Kenosha	1	Alfred C. Grosvenor	Dem.	Kenosha
22	Kenosha	2	George E. Mahoney	Dem.	Pleasant Prairie
01	Kewaunee		Albert D. Shimek	Dem.	Algoma
32	La Crosse	1	John Mulder	Rep.	La Crosse
32	La Crosse	2	Bernhard Mau	Dem.	West Salem
17	Lafayette		Joseph S. Robinson	Rep.	Platteville
30	Langlade		James T. Cavanaugh	Dem.	Antigo
25	Lincoln		Louis Leidiger	Dem.	Merrill
01	Manitowoc	1	Francis A. Yindra	Dem.	Manitowoc
01	Manitowoc	2	Raymond J. Scheuer	Dem.	Mishicot
25	Marathon	1	Frank J. Shortner	Dem.	Edgar
25	Marathon	2	Frank E. Bachhuber	Dem.	Wausau
30	Marinette		Charles A. Budlong	Rep.	Marinette
09	Milwaukee	1	Cornelius T. Young	Dem.	Milwaukee
06	Milwaukee	2	Clarence Kretlow	Dem.	Milwaukee
08	Milwaukee	3	Arthur J. Balzer	Prog.Dem.	Milwaukee
09	Milwaukee	4	John O'Malley	Dem.	Milwaukee
03	Milwaukee	5	Mary O. Kryszak	Dem.	Milwaukee
09	Milwaukee	6	John N. Kaiser	Dem.	Milwaukee
06	Milwaukee	7	Arthur Koegel	Soc.	Milwaukee
08	Milwaukee	8	James W. Higgins	Dem.	Milwaukee
05	Milwaukee	9	George Weissleder	Dem.	Milwaukee
07	Milwaukee	10	Frank Chermak	Dem.	South Milwaukee
03	Milwaukee	11	Martin Franzkowiak	Dem.	Milwaukee
07	Milwaukee	12	Max Galasinski	Dem.	Milwaukee
04	Milwaukee	13	Grover Ramstack	Dem.	Milwaukee
04	Milwaukee	14	Milton T. Murray	Rep.	Milwaukee
05	Milwaukee	15	Thomas H. Caffrey	Dem.	Milwaukee
06	Milwaukee	16	Herman B. Wegner	Soc.	Milwaukee
07	Milwaukee	17	Edward C. Werner	Dem.	Milwaukee
06	Milwaukee	18	Edward H. Kiefer	Soc.	Milwaukee
05	Milwaukee	19	Joseph L. Garvens	Dem.	West Milwaukee
08	Milwaukee	20	Charles B. Perry	Rep.	Wauwatosa
31	Monroe		Earl D. Hall	Rep.	Greenfield
02	Oconto		Gregory Flatley	Dem.	Oconto Falls
14	Outagamie	1	August W. Laabs	Rep.	Appleton
14	Outagamie	2	William M. Rohan	Dem.	Kaukauna
20	Ozaukee		Louis G. Kieker	Dem.	Thiensville
10	Pierce		Lloyd Tombleson	Rep.	Ellsworth
29	Polk		Marius Dueholm	Rep.	Luck
23	Portage		John Kostuck	Prog.Rep.	Stevens Point
12	Price		Gustave Bliese	Dem.	Phillips
21	Racine	1	Joseph Clancy	Dem.	Racine
21	Racine	2	Joseph C. Hamata	Dem.	Racine
21	Racine	3	Edward F. Rakow	Dem.	Burlington
27	Richland		Harley A. Martin	Dem.	Richland Center
15	Rock	1	Edward Grassman	Rep.	Edgerton
15	Rock	2	Ira E. Inman	Rep.	Beloit
12	Rusk & Sawyer		J. W. Carow	Rep.	Ladysmith
27	Sauk		Isaac C. Evans	Dem.	Spring Green
14	Shawano		Walter J. Dolan	Dem.	Shawano
20	Sheboygan	1	Joseph M. Theisen	Dem.	Sheboygan
20	Sheboygan	2	Charles A. Laack	Dem.	Plymouth
10	St. Croix		Arthur D. Kelly	Prog.Rep.	Hudson
24	Taylor		Anthony J. Opachen	Dem.	Medford
32	Trempealeau		Frank A. Kellman	Rep.	Galesville
16	Vernon		Hjalmer S. Halvorsen	Prog.Rep.	Westby
22	Walworth		Daniel E. LaBar	Rep.	Delavan
13	Washington		Joseph E. Russell	Dem.	Hartford
33	Waukesha	1	Walter G. Caldwell	Dem.	Waukesha
33	Waukesha	2	William H. Steele	Rep.	Pewaukee
23	Waupaca		Earle Moldenhauer	Dem.	Clintonville
19	Winnebago	1	Ray Novotny	Dem.	Oshkosh
19	Winnebago	2	William P. Grimes	Dem.	Neenah
24	Wood		Byrde M. Vaughan	Rep.	Wisconsin Rapids

== Committees ==
=== Senate committees ===
- Senate Standing Committee on Agriculture and Labor – C. Shearer, chair
- Senate Standing Committee on Committees – W. H. Edwards, chair
- Senate Standing Committee on Contingent Expenditures – B. Gettelman, chair
- Senate Standing Committee on Corporations and Taxation – O. Morris, chair
- Senate Standing Committee on Education and Public Welfare – W. H. Hunt, chair
- Senate Standing Committee on Highways – J. E. Cashman, chair
- Senate Standing Committee on the Judiciary – H. J. Severson, chair
- Senate Standing Committee on Legislative Procedure – O. S. Loomis, chair
- Senate Standing Committee on State and Local Government – M. F. White, chair
- Senate Special Committee on Building and Loan Association Legislation – H. W. Griswold, chair
- Senate Special Committee on Investigation of Grain and Warehouse Commission – M. G. Kelly, chair
- Senate Special Committee on Mortgage Foreclosures – O. S. Loomis, chair

=== Assembly committees ===
- Assembly Standing Committee on Agriculture – H. A. Martin, chair
- Assembly Standing Committee on Commerce and Manufactures – P. F. Daugs, chair
- Assembly Standing Committee on Conservation – G. Bliese, chair
- Assembly Standing Committee on Contingent Expenditures – W. J. Dolan, chair
- Assembly Standing Committee on Education – E. F. Rakow, chair
- Assembly Standing Committee on Elections – J. M. Theisen, chair
- Assembly Standing Committee on Engrossed Bills – A. J. Opachen, chair
- Assembly Standing Committee on Enrolled Bills – M. Weinberg, chair
- Assembly Standing Committee on Excise and Fees – L. Leidiger, chair
- Assembly Standing Committee on Highways – W. G. Caldwell, chair
- Assembly Standing Committee on Insurance and Banking – B. Mau, chair
- Assembly Standing Committee on the Judiciary – J. F. Fox, chair
- Assembly Standing Committee on Labor – A. J. Balzer, chair
- Assembly Standing Committee on Municipalities – M. Galasinski, chair
- Assembly Standing Committee on Printing – W. D. Leary, chair
- Assembly Standing Committee on Public Welfare – M. O. Kryszak, chair
- Assembly Standing Committee on Revision – W. P. Grimes, chair
- Assembly Standing Committee on Rules – H. E. Krueger, chair
- Assembly Standing Committee on State Affairs – F. Chermak, chair
- Assembly Standing Committee on Taxation – E. Moldenhauer, chair
- Assembly Standing Committee on Third Reading – J. E. Russell, chair
- Assembly Standing Committee on Transportation – I. C. Evans, chair
- Assembly Special Committee on Building and Loan Association Legislation – W. D. Leary, chair

=== Joint committees ===
- Joint Standing Committee on Finance – O. Mueller (Sen.) & J. C. Hamata (Asm.), co-chairs
- Joint Special Committee on Additional Farm Lands for State Prison – O. Mueller, chair
- Joint Special Committee on Farm Machinery Prices – H. J. Severson, chair
- Joint Special Committee on Huber Memorial Exercises – J. E. Cashman, chair
- Joint Special Committee on Investigation of the Department of Agriculture and Markets – G. E. Ingram, chair
- Joint Special Committee on Investigation of the Quality and Price of Beer – M. G. Kelly, chair
- Joint Special Committee on Reduction in Cost of Government – E. A. Clifford, chair
- Joint Special Committee on Small Loans Lobbying – H. W. Bolens, chair
- Joint Special Committee on Sources of Revenue for School Purposes – B. Gettelman, chair
- Joint Special Committee on Stabilization of Milk Prices – B. J. Gehrmann, chair
- Joint Special Committee on State Fair for 1933 – W. Shenners, chair

== Employees ==
=== Senate employees ===
- Chief Clerk: Robert A. Cobban
  - Assistant Chief Clerk: C. J. Knoche
- Sergeant-at-Arms: Emil A. Hartman
  - Assistant Sergeant-at-Arms: Norman J. Hippert
- Postmaster: William H. Kasiska

=== Assembly employees ===
- Chief Clerk: John J. Slocum
- Sergeant-at-Arms: George C. Faust
  - Assistant Sergeant-at-Arms: John E. Rohan
- Postmaster: James Carew

== Changes from the 60th Legislature ==
New districts for the 61st Legislature were defined in 1931 Wisconsin Special Session Act 27, passed into law in the 60th Wisconsin Legislature.

=== Senate redistricting ===
==== Summary of Senate changes ====
- 26 districts were left unchanged
- Milwaukee's 7 districts were slightly reconfigured without losing their geographic position within the county.

=== Assembly redistricting ===
==== Summary of Assembly changes ====
- 74 districts were left unchanged
- Two of Dane County's districts were slightly adjusted.
- Kenosha County's 2 districts were slightly adjusted.
- Marathon County's 2 districts were reconfigured.
- Milwaukee County's 20 districts were reconfigured.
