= 62nd Wisconsin Legislature =

Wisconsin legislative term for 1935–1936

←	61st	63rd	→
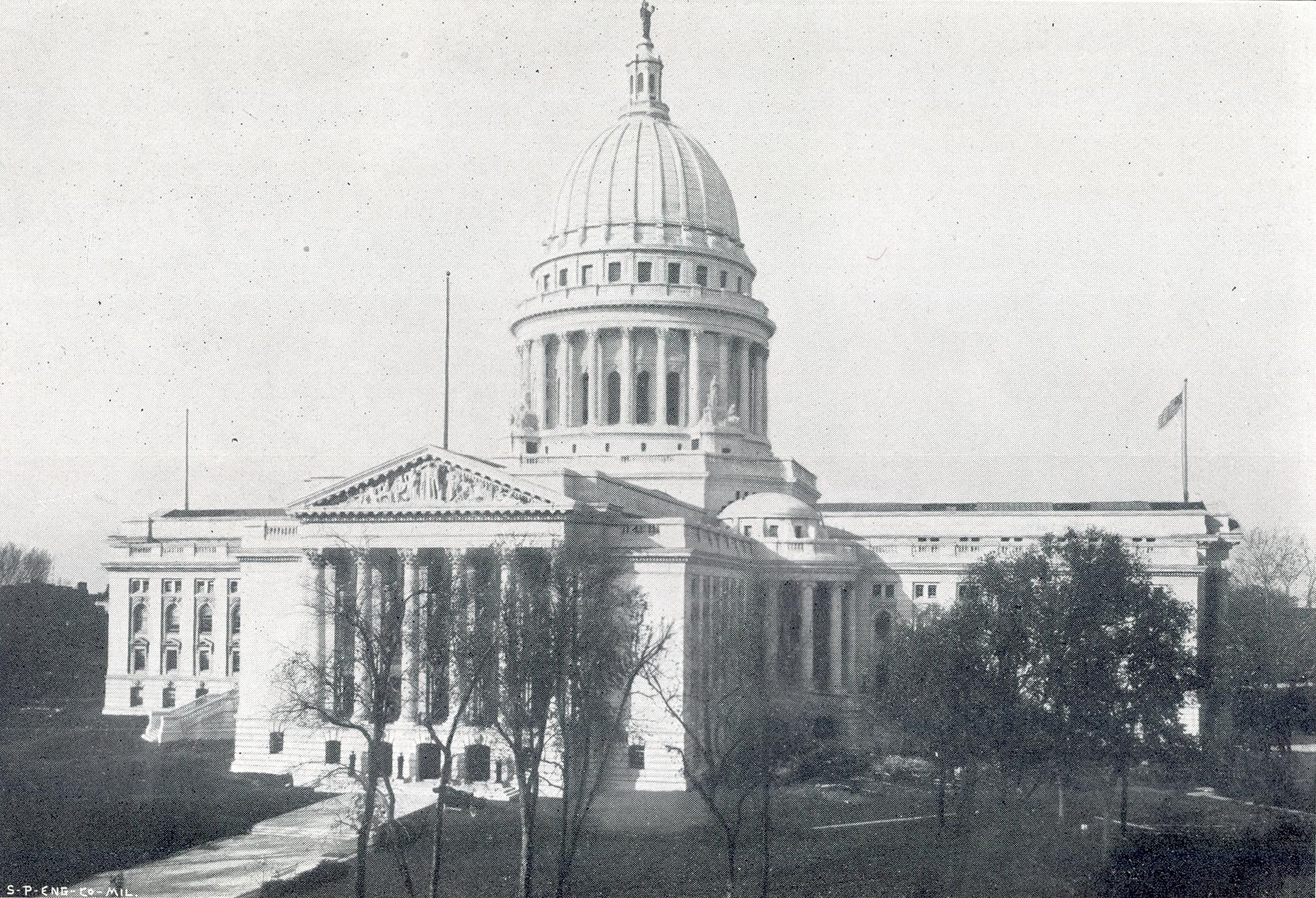
- Wisconsin State Capitol ca.1915

Overview
- Legislative body: Wisconsin Legislature
- Meeting place: Wisconsin State Capitol
- Term: January 7, 1935 – January 4, 1937
- Election: November 6, 1934

Senate
- Members: 33
- Senate President: Thomas J. O'Malley (D) (died May 27, 1936)
- President pro tempore: Harry W. Bolens (D)
- Party control: Democratic

Assembly
- Members: 100
- Assembly Speaker: Jorge W. Carow (P) (died Nov. 5, 1936)
- Party control: Progressive

Sessions
- Regular: January 9, 1935 – September 27, 1935

The Sixty-Second Wisconsin Legislature convened from January 9, 1935, to September 27, 1935, in regular session.

This was the first legislative term with a formal split between Progressive and Republican caucuses. It was also the first term since the 1893–1894 term in which the Republicans controlled neither house of the Legislature.

Senators representing odd-numbered districts were newly elected for this session and were serving the first two years of a four-year term. Assembly members were elected to a two-year term. Assembly members and odd-numbered senators were elected in the general election of November 6, 1934. Senators representing even-numbered districts were serving the third and fourth year of a four-year term, having been elected in the general election of November 8, 1932.

The governor of Wisconsin during this entire term was Progressive Philip La Follette, of Dane County, serving his second non-consecutive two-year term, having won election in the 1934 Wisconsin gubernatorial election. He previously served as governor from 1931 to 1933.

== Major events ==
- January 7, 1935: Inauguration of Philip La Follette as the 29th Governor of Wisconsin.
- May 27, 1935: The United States Supreme Court, in the case A.L.A. Schechter Poultry Corp. v. United States, ruled that the National Industrial Recovery Act of 1933 was unconstitutional.
- August 14, 1935: U.S. President Franklin D. Roosevelt signed the Social Security Act into law.
- September 15, 1935: The Nuremberg Laws went into effect in Nazi Germany, stripping citizenship from Jews.
- November 8, 1935: A dozen American labor union leaders came together to announce the creation of the Congress of Industrial Organizations.
- January 20, 1935: King George V of the United Kingdom of Great Britain and Northern Ireland died. He was immediately succeeded by his son Edward VIII, though he would never be granted coronation.
- May 27, 1936: Incumbent Wisconsin lieutenant governor Thomas J. O'Malley died in office.
- July 17, 1936: The Spanish Army of Africa launched a coup of the Second Spanish Republic, beginning the Spanish Civil War.
- July 20, 1936: The Montreux Convention Regarding the Regime of the Straits was signed, allowing Turkey to fortify the straits of the Bosporus and Dardanelles, but guaranteeing free passage to ships of all nations in peacetime.
- August 1, 1936: The opening of the 1936 Summer Olympics in Berlin was the first live televised broadcast of a sporting event.
- October 23, 1936: The Italo-German protocol of 23 October 1936 was signed, establishing the Rome–Berlin Axis.
- November 3, 1936: 1936 United States general election:
  - Franklin D. Roosevelt re-elected President of the United States.
  - Philip La Follette re-elected Governor of Wisconsin.
  - Wisconsin voters ratified an amendment to the state constitution creating some exemptions to the prohibition on free passes for state office-seekers.
- November 5, 1936: Incumbent speaker of the Wisconsin Assembly Jorge W. Carow died in office.
- November 25, 1936: The Anti-Comintern Pact was signed between Germany and Japan.
- December 11, 1936: King Edward VIII abdicated the throne of the United Kingdom, in favor of his younger brother, George VI.
- December 13, 1936: The Green Bay Packers won the 1936 NFL Championship Game.

== Major legislation ==
- 1935 Joint Resolution 98: Second legislative passage of a proposed amendment to the state constitution to create exceptions to the prohibition on free passes for office-seekers. This amendment was ratified by voters at the November 1936 election.

== Party summary ==
=== Senate summary ===
Senate partisan composition Democratic: 14 seats Progressive: 13 seats Republican: 6 seats

	Party (Shading indicates majority caucus)				Total	
	Dem.	Soc.	Prog.	Rep.	Total	Vacant
End of previous Legislature	9	1	0	21	31	2
Start of Reg. Session	14	0	13	6	33	0
Final voting share	81.82%			18.18%		
Beginning of the next Legislature	9	0	16	8	33	0

=== Assembly summary ===
Assembly partisan composition Democratic: 35 seats Socialist: 3 seats Progressive: 45 seats Republican: 17 seats

	Party (Shading indicates majority caucus)				Total	
	Dem.	Soc.	Prog.	Rep.	Total	Vacant
End of previous Legislature	58	3	0	38	99	1
Start of Reg. Session	35	3	45	17	100	0
From Jan. 18, 1936 (Note: Progressive Marius Dueholm (Polk County) died.)	35	3	44	17	99	1
From Nov. 5, 1936 (Note: Progressive Jorge W. Carow (Rusk & Sawyer counties) died.)	35	3	43	17	98	2
Final voting share	38.78%		43.88%	17.35%		
Beginning of the next Legislature	31	0	48	21	100	0

== Sessions ==
- Regular session: January 9, 1935 – September 27, 1935

== Leaders ==
=== Senate leadership ===
- President of the Senate: Thomas J. O'Malley (D) (died May 27, 1936)
- President pro tempore: Harry W. Bolens (D–Port Washington)

=== Assembly leadership ===
- Speaker of the Assembly: Jorge W. Carow (P–Ladysmith)

== Members ==
=== Members of the Senate ===
Members of the Senate for the Sixty-Second Wisconsin Legislature:

Senate partisan representation Democratic: 14 seats Progressive: 13 seats Republican: 6 seats

Dist.	Counties	Senator	Residence	Party
01	Door, Kewaunee, & Manitowoc	John E. Cashman	Denmark	Prog.
02	Brown & Oconto	E. F. Brunette	Green Bay	Dem.
03	Milwaukee (South City)	Arthur L. Zimny	Milwaukee	Dem.
04	Milwaukee (Northeast County & Northeast City)	Oscar Morris	Milwaukee	Rep.
05	Milwaukee (Northwest City)	Harold V. Schoenecker	Milwaukee	Dem.
06	Milwaukee (North-Central City)	Charles H. Phillips	Milwaukee	Dem.
07	Milwaukee (Southeast County & Southeast City)	Max Galasinski	Milwaukee	Dem.
08	Milwaukee (Western County)	William Shenners Jr.	West Allis	Dem.
09	Milwaukee (City Downtown)	James L. Callan	Milwaukee	Dem.
10	Buffalo, Pepin, Pierce, & St. Croix	Walter H. Hunt	River Falls	Prog.
11	Bayfield, Burnett, Douglas, & Washburn	Philip E. Nelson	Maple	Rep.
12	Ashland, Iron, Price, Rusk, Sawyer, & Vilas	Joseph E. McDermid	Ladysmith	Prog.
13	Dodge & Washington	Frank E. Panzer	Oakfield	Prog.
14	Outagamie & Shawano	Mike Mack	Shiocton	Rep.
15	Rock	Maurice Coakley	Beloit	Rep.
16	Crawford, Grant, & Vernon	William D. Carroll	Prairie du Chien	Dem.
17	Green, Iowa, & Lafayette	George Engebretson	South Wayne	Prog.
18	Fond du Lac, Green Lake & Waushara	Morley G. Kelly	Fond du Lac	Dem.
19	Calumet & Winnebago	Pierce A. Morrissey	Rush Lake	Dem.
20	Ozaukee & Sheboygan	Harry W. Bolens	Port Washington	Dem.
21	Racine	Joseph Clancy	Racine	Dem.
22	Kenosha & Walworth	Conrad Shearer	Kenosha	Rep.
23	Portage & Waupaca	Herman J. Severson	Iola	Prog.
24	Clark, Taylor, & Wood	Walter J. Rush	Neillsville	Prog.
25	Lincoln & Marathon	Roland E. Kannenberg	Wausau	Prog.
26	Dane	Harold Groves	Madison	Prog.
27	Columbia, Richland, & Sauk	E. Myrwyn Rowlands	Cambria	Prog.
28	Chippewa & Eau Claire	G. Erle Ingram	Eau Claire	Prog.
29	Barron, Dunn, & Polk	John A. Anderson	Barron	Prog.
30	Florence, Forest, Langlade, Marinette, & Oneida	Sherman W. Wade	Antigo	Dem.
31	Adams, Juneau, Monroe, & Marquette	J. Earl Leverich	Sparta	Prog.
32	Jackson, La Crosse, & Trempealeau	Harry W. Griswold	West Salem	Rep.
33	Jefferson & Waukesha	Chester Dempsey	Merton	Dem.

=== Members of the Assembly ===
Members of the Assembly for the Sixty-Second Wisconsin Legislature:

Assembly partisan composition Democratic: 35 seats Socialist: 3 seats Progressive: 45 seats Republican: 17 seats

Milwaukee County districts

Senate Dist.	County	Dist.	Representative	Party	Residence
31	Adams & Marquette		Edwin W. Blomquist	Prog.	Adams
12	Ashland		Clarence V. Olson	Prog.	Ashland
29	Barron		Charles A. Beggs	Prog.	Rice Lake
11	Bayfield		John C. Sibbald	Prog.	Grandview
02	Brown	1	Robert E. Lynch	Dem.	Green Bay
02	Brown	2	William J. Sweeney	Dem.	De Pere
10	Buffalo & Pepin		Arthur A. Hitt	Prog.	Alma
11	Burnett & Washburn		Harry Bergren	Prog.	Siren
19	Calumet		John W. Short	Dem.	Chilton
28	Chippewa		George H. Hipke	Rep.	Stanley
24	Clark		Victor Nehs	Prog.	Neillsville
27	Columbia		William F. Groves	Prog.	Lodi
16	Crawford		Thorleif A. Peterson	Dem.	Soldiers Grove
26	Dane	1	Herbert C. Schenk	Prog.	Madison
26	Dane	2	James C. Hanson	Prog.	Deerfield
26	Dane	3	Albert J. Baker	Prog.	Mount Horeb
13	Dodge	1	Elmer L. Genzmer	Dem.	Mayville
13	Dodge	2	Henry E. Krueger	Dem.	Beaver Dam
01	Door		Frank N. Graass	Rep.	Sturgeon Bay
11	Douglas	1	Michael H. Hall	Prog.	Superior
11	Douglas	2	Elmer Peterson	Prog.	Poplar
29	Dunn		James D. Millar	Prog.	Menomonie
28	Eau Claire		John T. Pritchard	Prog.	Eau Claire
30	Florence, Forest, & Oneida		Herman L. Kronschnabl	Prog.	Crandon
18	Fond du Lac	1	Maurice J. Fitzsimons Jr.	Dem.	Fond du Lac
18	Fond du Lac	2	John E. Johnson	Prog.	Brandon
16	Grant	1	William H. Goldthorpe	Rep.	Cuba City
16	Grant	2	Hugh A. Harper	Prog.	Lancaster
17	Green		Ernst J. Hoesly	Prog.	New Glarus
18	Green Lake & Waushara		Reuben W. Peterson	Rep.	Berlin
17	Iowa		John S. Jackson	Prog.	Mineral Point
12	Iron & Vilas		Paul Alfonsi	Prog.	Pence
32	Jackson		Peter A. Hemmy	Prog.	Humbird
33	Jefferson		Palmer F. Daugs	Dem.	Fort Atkinson
31	Juneau		William H. Barnes	Prog.	New Lisbon
22	Kenosha	1	Alfred C. Grosvenor	Dem.	Kenosha
22	Kenosha	2	Matt G. Siebert	Dem.	Salem
01	Kewaunee		Albert D. Shimek	Dem.	Algoma
32	La Crosse	1	John Mulder	Rep.	La Crosse
32	La Crosse	2	Harry W. Schilling	Prog.	Onalaska
17	Lafayette		Joseph S. Robinson	Rep.	Platteville
30	Langlade		James T. Cavanaugh	Dem.	Antigo
25	Lincoln		Reno W. Trego	Prog.	Merrill
01	Manitowoc	1	Otto A. Vogel	Prog.	Manitowoc
01	Manitowoc	2	David Sigman	Prog.	Two Rivers
25	Marathon	1	Joseph L. Barber	Prog.	Marathon
25	Marathon	2	Rudolph Meisner	Dem.	Wausau
30	Marinette		Louis W. Staudenmaier	Dem.	Marinette
09	Milwaukee	1	Cornelius T. Young	Dem.	Milwaukee
06	Milwaukee	2	Clarence Kretlow	Dem.	Milwaukee
08	Milwaukee	3	Allen Busby	Prog.	Milwaukee
09	Milwaukee	4	John O'Malley	Dem.	Milwaukee
03	Milwaukee	5	Mary O. Kryszak	Dem.	Milwaukee
09	Milwaukee	6	John N. Kaiser	Dem.	Milwaukee
06	Milwaukee	7	Arthur Koegel	Soc.	Milwaukee
08	Milwaukee	8	Donald P. Ryan	Dem.	Milwaukee
05	Milwaukee	9	George Weissleder	Dem.	Milwaukee
07	Milwaukee	10	John W. Grobschmidt	Prog.	South Milwaukee
03	Milwaukee	11	Martin Franzkowiak	Dem.	Milwaukee
07	Milwaukee	12	Clemens Michalski	Dem.	Milwaukee
04	Milwaukee	13	Bernard B. Kroenke	Dem.	Milwaukee
04	Milwaukee	14	Milton T. Murray	Rep.	Milwaukee
05	Milwaukee	15	Thomas H. Caffrey	Dem.	Milwaukee
06	Milwaukee	16	Herman B. Wegner	Soc.	Milwaukee
07	Milwaukee	17	Martin F. Howard	Dem.	Milwaukee
06	Milwaukee	18	Edward H. Kiefer	Soc.	Milwaukee
05	Milwaukee	19	Joseph L. Garvens	Dem.	West Milwaukee
08	Milwaukee	20	James L. Foley Jr.	Dem.	Wauwatosa
31	Monroe		Earl D. Hall	Prog.	Greenfield
02	Oconto		Bernard E. Brandt	Prog.	Lena
14	Outagamie	1	August W. Laabs	Rep.	Appleton
14	Outagamie	2	William Bay	Prog.	Kaukauna
20	Ozaukee		Nicholas J. Bichler	Dem.	Belgium
10	Pierce		Theodore Swanson	Rep.	Ellsworth
29	Polk		Marius Dueholm	Prog.	Luck
23	Portage		John Kostuck	Prog.	Stevens Point
12	Price		Frank Stone	Rep.	Park Falls
21	Racine	1	John L. Sieb	Prog.	Racine
21	Racine	2	Joseph C. Hamata	Dem.	Racine
21	Racine	3	Edward F. Rakow	Dem.	Burlington
27	Richland		Vernon W. Thomson	Rep.	Richland Center
15	Rock	1	Edward Grassman	Rep.	Edgerton
15	Rock	2	Ira E. Inman	Rep.	Beloit
12	Rusk & Sawyer		J. W. Carow	Prog.	Ladysmith
27	Sauk		George J. Woerth	Prog.	Sauk City
14	Shawano		Paul T. Fuhrman	Prog.	Bowler
20	Sheboygan	1	Joseph M. Theisen	Dem.	Sheboygan
20	Sheboygan	2	Charles A. Laack	Dem.	Plymouth
10	St. Croix		Arthur D. Kelly	Prog.	Hudson
24	Taylor		Carl M. Nelson	Rep.	Medford
32	Trempealeau		Tom Lomsdahl	Prog.	Osseo
16	Vernon		Hjalmer S. Halvorsen	Prog.	Westby
22	Walworth		Daniel E. LaBar	Rep.	Delavan
13	Washington		Adam F. Poltl	Prog.	Hartford
33	Waukesha	1	Lyle E. Douglass	Rep.	Waukesha
33	Waukesha	2	Alfred R. Ludvigsen	Rep.	Pewaukee
23	Waupaca		Alvin A. Handrich	Prog.	Manawa
19	Winnebago	1	Ray Novotny	Dem.	Oshkosh
19	Winnebago	2	William P. Grimes	Dem.	Neenah
24	Wood		Byrde M. Vaughan	Prog.	Wisconsin Rapids

== Committees ==
=== Senate committees ===
- Senate Standing Committee on Agriculture and Labor – C. Shearer, chair
- Senate Standing Committee on Committees – W. D. Carroll, chair
- Senate Standing Committee on Contingent Expenditures – M. G. Kelly, chair
- Senate Standing Committee on Corporations and Taxation – O. Morris, chair
- Senate Standing Committee on Education and Public Welfare – P. E. Nelson, chair
- Senate Standing Committee on Highways – J. Clancy, chair
- Senate Standing Committee on the Judiciary – C. H. Phillips, chair
- Senate Standing Committee on Legislative Procedure – H. W. Bolens, chair
- Senate Standing Committee on State and Local Government – M. Galasinski, chair

=== Assembly committees ===
- Assembly Standing Committee on Agriculture – J. C. Hanson, chair
- Assembly Standing Committee on Commerce and Manufactures – A. Busby, chair
- Assembly Standing Committee on Conservation – P. A. Hemmy, chair
- Assembly Standing Committee on Contingent Expenditures – H. A. Harper, chair
- Assembly Standing Committee on Education – P. Alfonsi, chair
- Assembly Standing Committee on Elections – A. D. Kelly, chair
- Assembly Standing Committee on Engrossed Bills – J. C. Hamata, chair
- Assembly Standing Committee on Enrolled Bills – J. L. Barber, chair
- Assembly Standing Committee on Excise and Fees – J. S. Robinson, chair
- Assembly Standing Committee on Highways – E. D. Hall, chair
- Assembly Standing Committee on Insurance and Banking – J. W. Grobschmidt, chair
- Assembly Standing Committee on the Judiciary – C. V. Olson, chair
- Assembly Standing Committee on Labor – W. Bay, chair
- Assembly Standing Committee on Municipalities – B. M. Vaughan, chair
- Assembly Standing Committee on Printing – H. L. Kronschnabl, chair
- Assembly Standing Committee on Public Welfare – M. Dueholm, chair
- Assembly Standing Committee on Revision – P. T. Fuhrman, chair
- Assembly Standing Committee on Rules – E. J. Hoesly, chair
- Assembly Standing Committee on State Affairs – A. A. Hitt, chair
- Assembly Standing Committee on Taxation – H. S. Halvorsen, chair
- Assembly Standing Committee on Third Reading – J. L. Sieb, chair
- Assembly Standing Committee on Transportation – J. T. Pritchard, chair

=== Joint committees ===
- Joint Standing Committee on Finance – E. F. Brunette (Sen.) & C. A. Beggs (Asm.), co-chairs

== Employees ==
=== Senate employees ===
- Chief Clerk: Lawrence R. Larsen
  - Assistant Chief Clerk: Milton J. Bailey
- Sergeant-at-Arms: Emil A. Hartman
  - Assistant Sergeant-at-Arms: Albert E. Daley
- Postmaster: Joseph Westlund

=== Assembly employees ===
- Chief Clerk: Lester R. Johnson
  - Journal Clerk: Charles E. Tuffley
- Sergeant-at-Arms: Gustave Rheingans
  - Assistant Sergeant-at-Arms: R. L. Williams
- Postmaster: William Kasiska
