= Taylor G. Brown =

20th century American politician

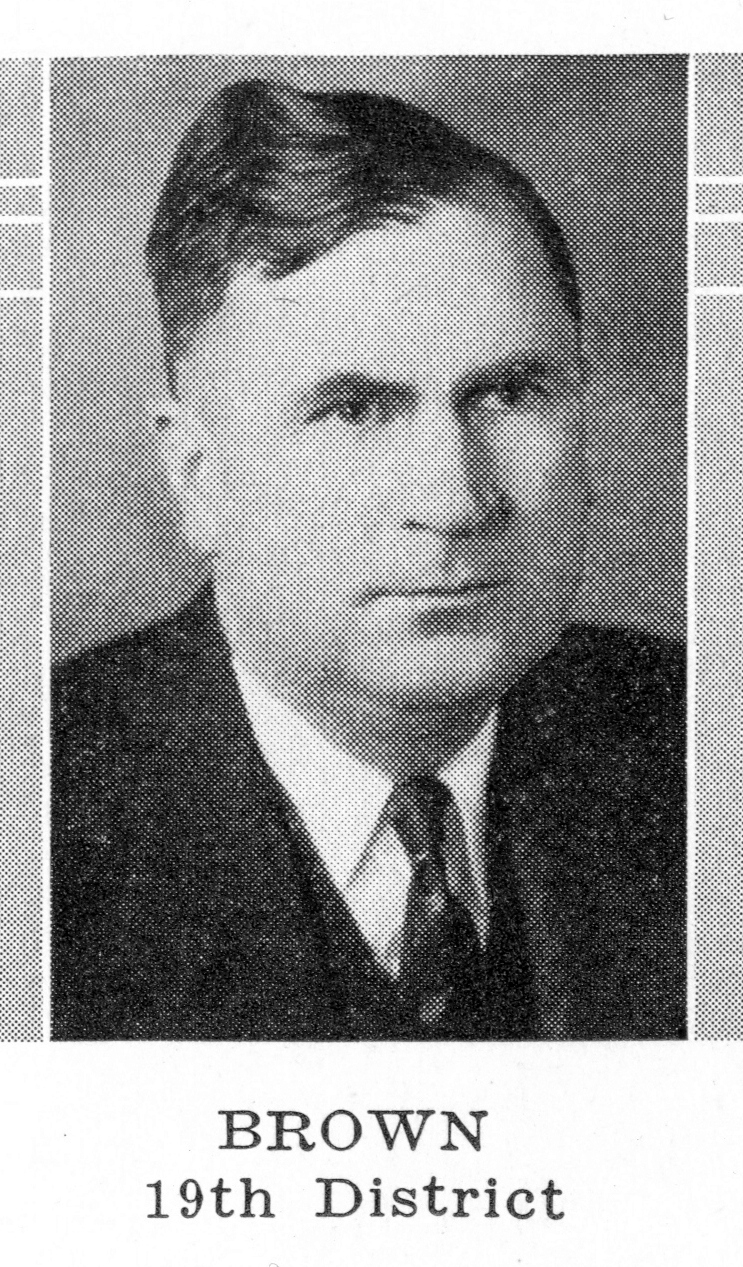

Member of the Wisconsin Senate from the 19th district
- In office January 2, 1939 – January 1, 1951
- Preceded by: Pierce A. Morrissey
- Succeeded by: William Draheim

41st Mayor of Oshkosh, Wisconsin
- In office April 1930 – April 1933
- Preceded by: Arthur C. McHenry
- Succeeded by: George F. Oaks

Personal details
- Born: February 28, 1890 Richland County, Wisconsin, U.S.
- Died: July 18, 1957 (aged 67) Oshkosh, Wisconsin, U.S.
- Resting place: Lake View Memorial Park, Oshkosh
- Party: Republican
- Spouse: Bergina Hauge (m. 1915–1957)
- Children: Dorothy Lorraine (Mosher)^{(b. 1916; died 1983)}; Genevieve Lois (Misky)^{(b. 1918; died 1988)}; Taylor Clifton Brown^{(b. 1921; died 1983)}; Loretta Adelaide (Horne)^{(b. 1925; died 2005)}
- Education: University of Wisconsin
- Occupation: Farmer, teacher

Taylor Groves Brown (February 28, 1890 – July 18, 1957) was an American farmer, educator, and Republican politician from Oshkosh, Wisconsin. He was the 41st mayor of Oshkosh and served three terms in the Wisconsin Senate, representing the 19th Senate district from 1939 to 1951.

== Biography ==
Brown was born on February 28, 1890, in Richland County, Wisconsin. He attended the University of Wisconsin-Platteville and the University of Wisconsin-Madison.

== Career ==
Brown was a member of the Senate from the 19th district from 1939 to 1950. Previously, he was Mayor of Oshkosh, Wisconsin, from 1930 to 1933. He was a Republican.

Brown died July 18, 1957, in Oshkosh, Wisconsin, where he is buried at the Lake View Memorial Park.

== See also ==
- List of mayors of Oshkosh, Wisconsin

Wisconsin Senate
Preceded by Pierce A. Morrissey	Member of the Wisconsin Senate from the 19th district January 2, 1939 – January 1, 1951	Succeeded by William Draheim
Political offices
Preceded by Arthur C. McHenry	Mayor of Oshkosh, Wisconsin; April 1930 – April 1933	Succeeded by George F. Oaks
