= Isaac Evans =

Isaac Evans may refer to:

- Isaac Newton Evans (1827–1901), member of the U.S. House of Representatives from Pennsylvania
- Isaac C. Evans (1879–?), member of the Wisconsin State Assembly
- Isaac Evans (trade unionist) (1847–1897), Welsh trade union leader and politician
- Isaac H. Evans, a two-masted schooner berthed in Rockland, Maine
