= Senator Draheim =

Senator Draheim may refer to:

- Rich Draheim (fl. 1980s–2010s), Minnesota State Senate
- William Draheim (1898–1976), Wisconsin State Senate
