= James L. Foley Jr. =

American politician

James Lewis Foley Jr. (November 12, 1885 – February 11, 1960) was an American politician and farmer.

Born in Wauwatosa, Wisconsin, Foley went to Marquette University and University of Wisconsin. He was a farmer. In 1935, Foley served in the Wisconsin State Assembly and was a Democrat.
