= Grover Ramstack =

American politician

Grover Ramstack (June 3, 1886 – August 12, 1948) was an American politician and laborer.

Born in Milwaukee, Wisconsin, Ramstack worked in the Milwaukee city water department and later worked in the moulding business. He was also a railroad clerk. In 1933, Ramstack served in the Wisconsin State Assembly and was a Democrat. He died in Milwaukee, Wisconsin.
