= Bernhard Gettelman =

American politician (1889–1965)

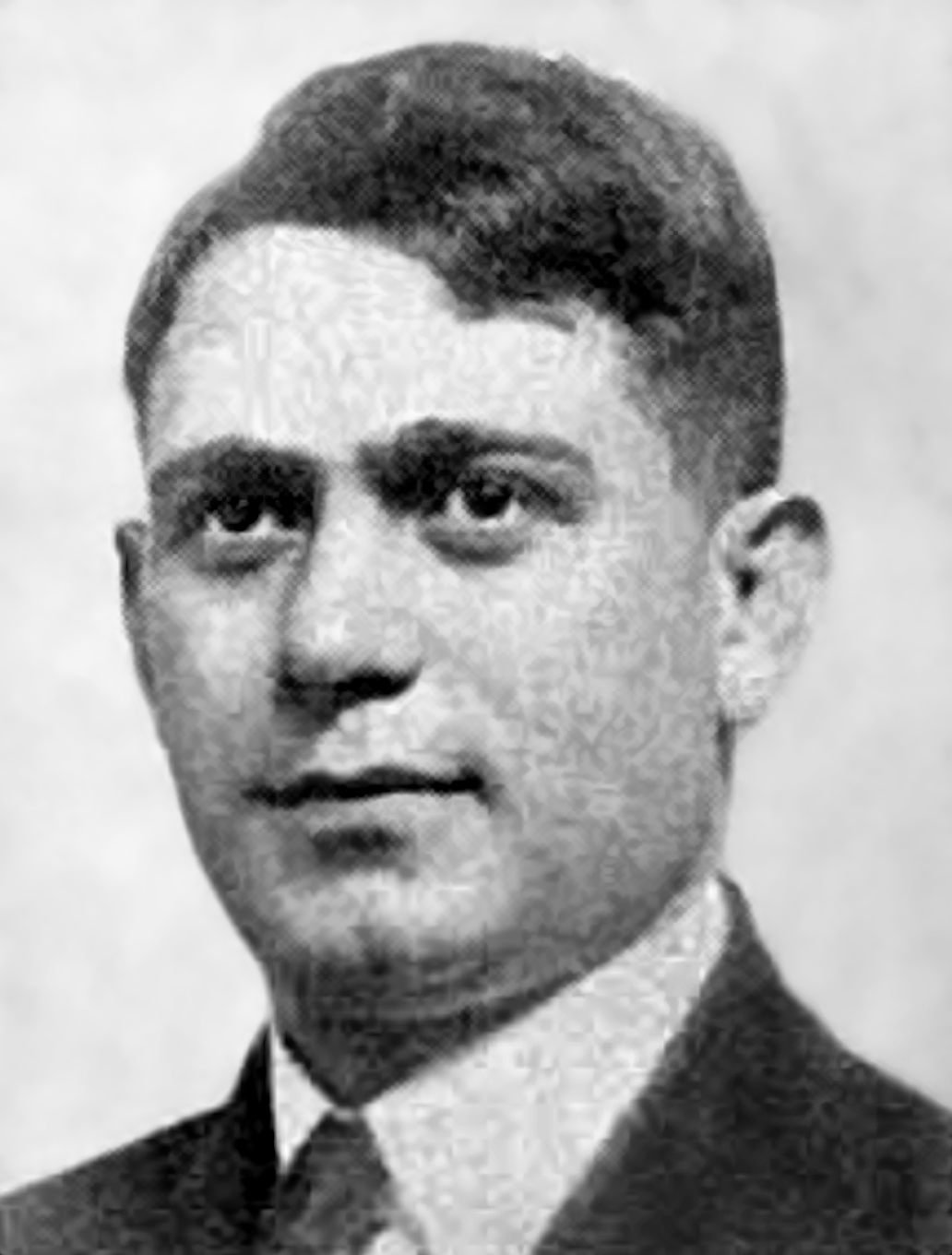
- Portrait from the 1923 Wisconsin Blue Book

Member of the Wisconsin Senate from the 5th district
- In office January 2, 1939 – April 29, 1954
- Preceded by: Harold V. Schoenecker
- Succeeded by: Walter L. Merten
- In office January 1, 1923 – January 7, 1935
- Preceded by: Rudolph Beyer
- Succeeded by: Harold V. Schoenecker

Member of the Wisconsin State Assembly from the Milwaukee 7th district
- In office January 1, 1917 – January 6, 1919
- Preceded by: Edward Zinn
- Succeeded by: Alex C. Ruffing

Personal details
- Born: December 23, 1889 Chicago, Illinois, U.S.
- Died: August 30, 1965 (aged 75) Milwaukee, Wisconsin, U.S.
- Resting place: Pinelawn Memorial Park, Milwaukee, Wisconsin
- Party: Republican
- Nickname: Benny

Bernhard "Benny" Gettelman (December 23, 1889 – August 30, 1965) was an American Republican politician. He served 27 years in the Wisconsin State Senate, representing Milwaukee, and earlier served one term in the State Assembly.

== Biography ==
Gettelman was born in Chicago, Illinois, and moved to Milwaukee, Wisconsin, at a young age. He worked for the Electric Company for ten years, and was then appointed a deputy sheriff in Milwaukee County.

In 1916 he was elected to the Wisconsin State Assembly, where he authored the "Fireman's law". He did not run for a second term in 1918 and returned to the sheriff's office.

He was subsequently promoted to chief deputy sheriff. He led the sheriff's force present at the "Cudahy riots"—a violent clash resulting from a labor dispute in 1919. During the riots, he ordered this men to fire over the heads of the rioters.

In 1922, he was elected to the Wisconsin State Senate. He was re-elected in 1926 and 1930, but was defeated seeking a fourth term in 1934. He returned and was elected again 1938, and went on to serve another 15 years in the Senate. He was a delegate to the Republican National Convention in 1932, 1936, 1940, 1944 and 1952.

He resigned his Senate seat in April 1954 after he was appointed U.S. customs collector at Milwaukee by President Dwight D. Eisenhower. He served in this role through the end of the Eisenhower administration and immediately began discussing a resumption of his political activities. He ran for his old seat in the State Senate in 1962, but was defeated by Democrat Charles J. Schmidt.

Gettelman died of pneumonia at a Milwaukee hospital on August 30, 1965.
