= Maurice Coakley =

American politician

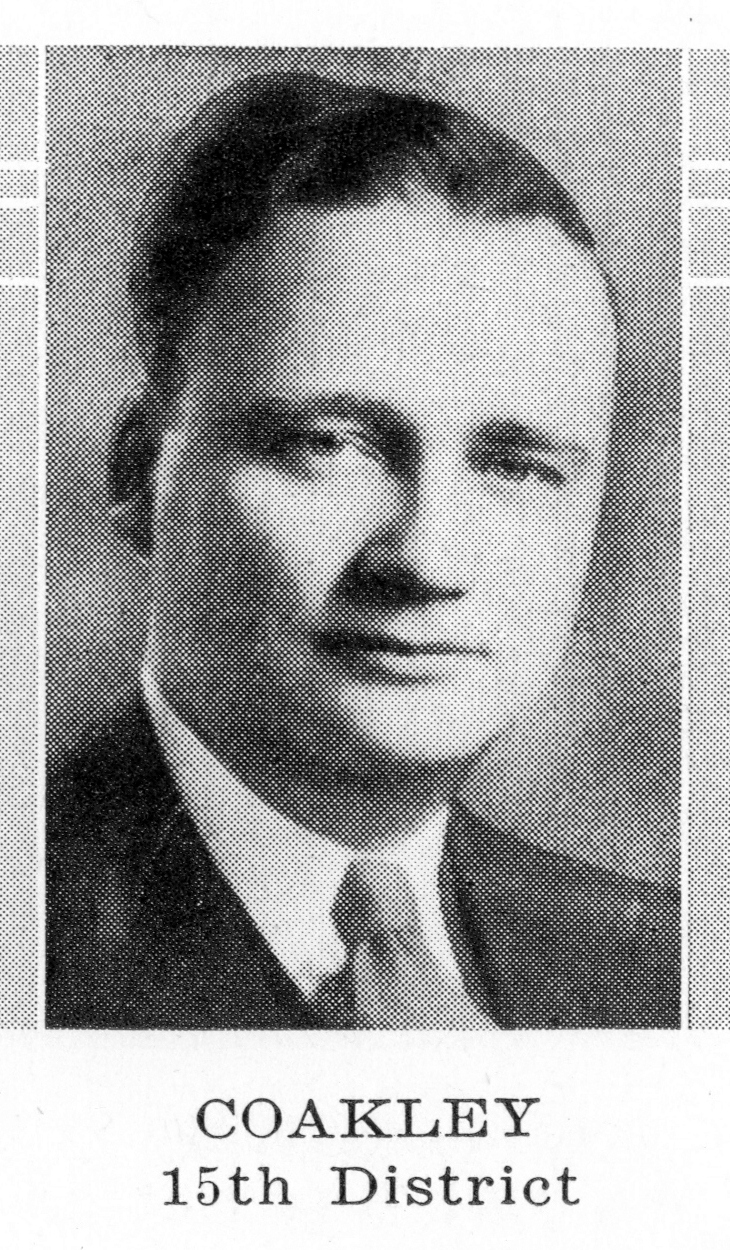
Maurice P. Coakley

Maurice P. Coakley (January 9, 1906 – March 14, 1991) was a lawyer from Beloit, Wisconsin, who served seven years as a Republican member of the Wisconsin State Senate from the 15th District (Rock County), resigned to serve in World War II, then spent 25 years as a lobbyist for the Wisconsin Manufacturers Association.

== Background ==
Coakley was born in Beloit on January 9, 1906. He earned a B.A. degree from Beloit College in 1926, and graduated in 1930 from the University of Wisconsin Law School, taking up the practice of law in his home town. From 1927 until his 1934 election to the Senate he served as a record clerk in the Senate.

From 1931 to 1932 he was an instructor in political science at Beloit College, and in 1932 he was admitted to the bar of the Territory of Hawaii.

== Public office ==
In 1934 Coakley won a plurality in a five-way Republican primary contest for the Senate seat won the year before by Democrat Alexander Paul. In the general election he was successful in unseating Paul, with 8847 votes to 8076 for Paul and 6168 for Progressive George Geffs. He was assigned to the standing committee on the judiciary. He was unchallenged in the 1938 primary, and easily won re-election against Progressive Joseph Sweeney.

In the 1939 and 1941 sessions, Coakley served as Republican floor leader. During the 1939 session, the Republicans had 16 seats (one short of a majority), and Coakley became majority leader with the votes of six Democrats (the Democrats received some committee chairmanships); he would later recall, "When the Democrats voted with us that session, we could suspend the rules. When they didn't, we couldn't even pass a bill. We were between the door and the jamb a lot of time."

In July 1940 he was appointed private and military secretary to Governor Julius Heil. He did not run for re-election in 1942, choosing instead to enlist in the U.S. Navy. (He was succeeded by fellow Republican Robert P. Robinson.)

Coakley served as Senate majority leader during late 1930s sessions.

== After the Senate ==
Coakley was discharged from the Navy in 1946, and took a job as a lobbyist for the Wisconsin Manufacturers Association, a post he would hold until his retirement in 1972.

Coakley died on March 14, 1991, in Richmond, Texas, at the age of 85.
