= Wisconsin's 19th Senate district =

American legislative district in central Wisconsin

Wisconsin's 19th State Senate district
- 2024 map defined in 2023 Wisc. Act 94; 2022 map defined in Johnson v. Wisconsin Elections Commission; 2011 map was defined in 2011 Wisc. Act 43 composed of Assembly districts 55, 56, and 57
Senator
Rachael Cabral-Guevara; R–Appleton
since January 3, 2023 (3 years, 55 days)
- Demographics: 91.71% White; 1.08% Black; 3.24% Hispanic; 1.86% Asian; 1.57% Native American; 0.06% Hawaiian/Pacific Islander
- Population (2020) • Voting age: 179,618; 140,998
- Website: Official website
- Notes: Central Wisconsin

The 19th Senate district of Wisconsin is one of 33 districts in the Wisconsin Senate. Located in central Wisconsin, the district comprises all of Waushara County, most of Winnebago County, western Outagamie County, southern Waupaca County, and part of eastern Adams County and southeast Portage County. The district also contains Lake Poygan and Hartman Creek State Park.

== Current elected officials ==
Rachael Cabral-Guevara is the senator representing the 19th district since January 2023. She previously served in the State Assembly, representing the 55th Assembly district from 2021 to 2023.

Each Wisconsin State Senate district is composed of three State Assembly districts. The 19th Senate district comprises the 55th, 56th, and 57th Assembly districts. The current representatives of those districts are:

- Assembly District 55: Nate Gustafson (R–Fox Crossing)
- Assembly District 56: David Murphy (R–Greenville)
- Assembly District 57: Kevin David Petersen (R–Waupaca)

The 19th Senate district, in its current borders, crosses three congressional districts. The portion of the district in Adams and Portage counties falls within Wisconsin's 3rd congressional district, represented by U.S. Representative Derrick Van Orden. The portion in Waushara and most of Winnebago County falls within Wisconsin's 6th congressional district, which is represented by U.S. Representative Glenn Grothman. The remainder of the district in Outagamie, Waupaca, and north-central Winnebago fall within Wisconsin's 8th congressional district, represented by U.S. Representative Tony Wied.

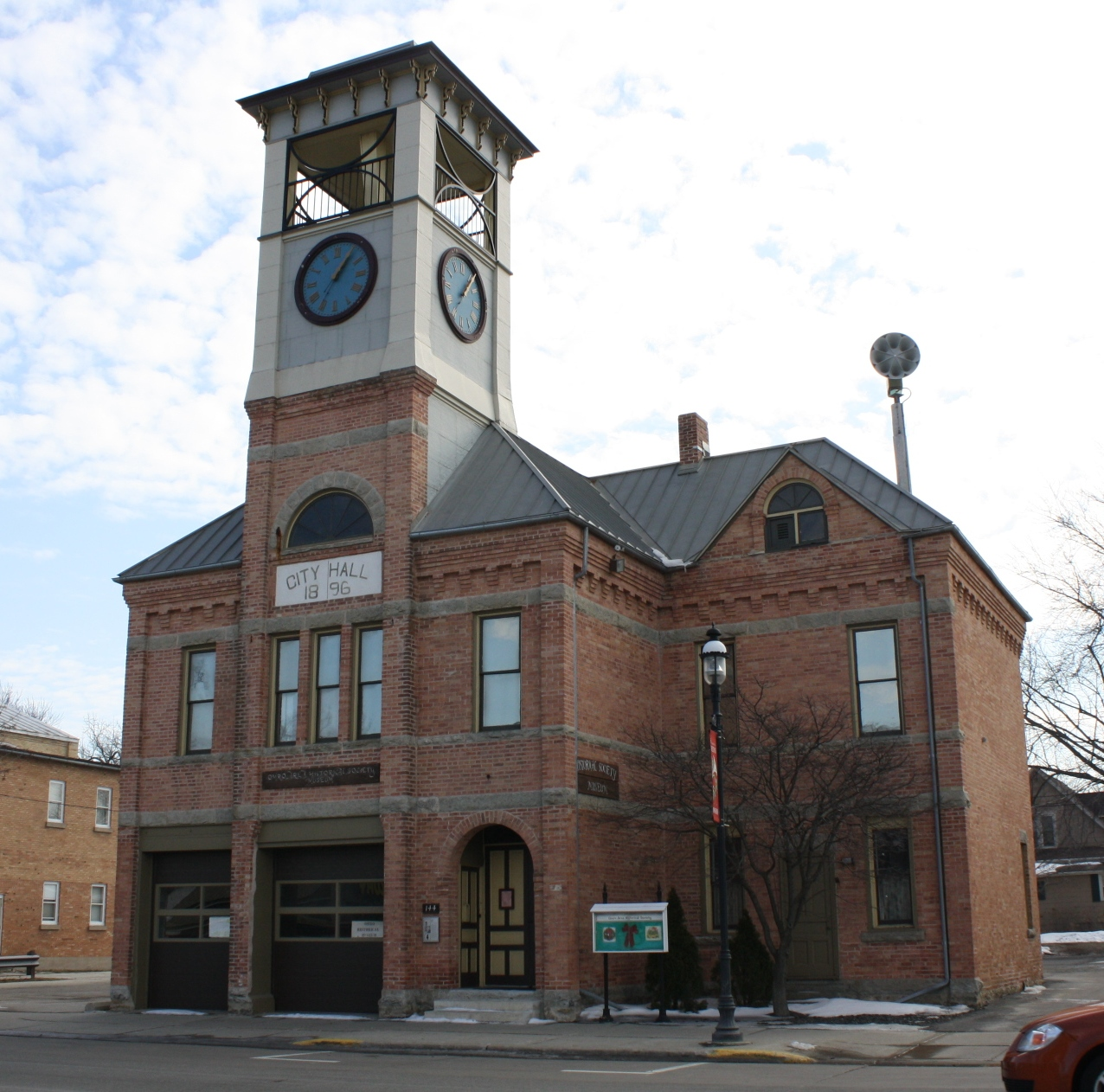
Omro Village Hall and Engine House in Omro

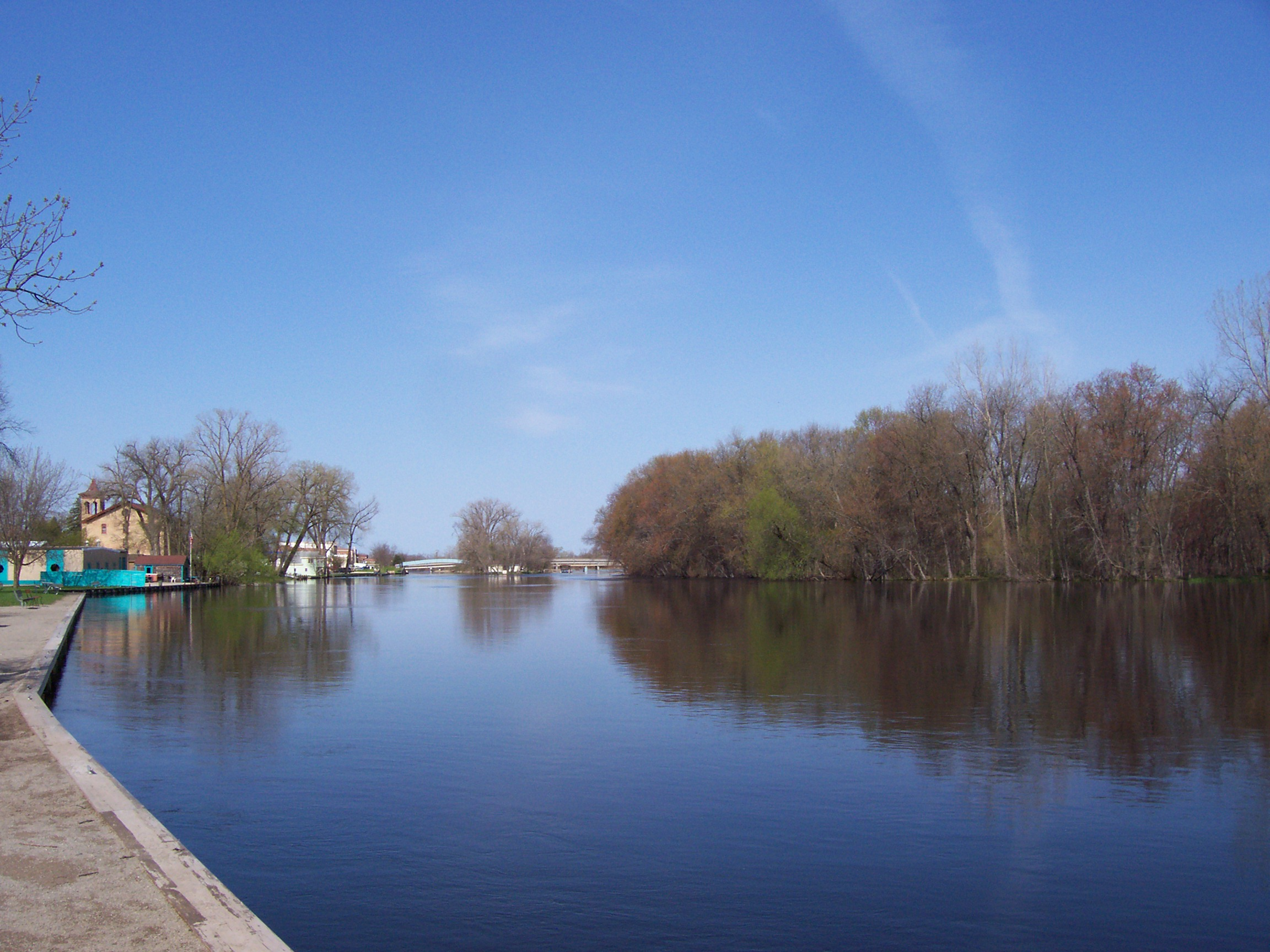
Fox River viewed from Omro

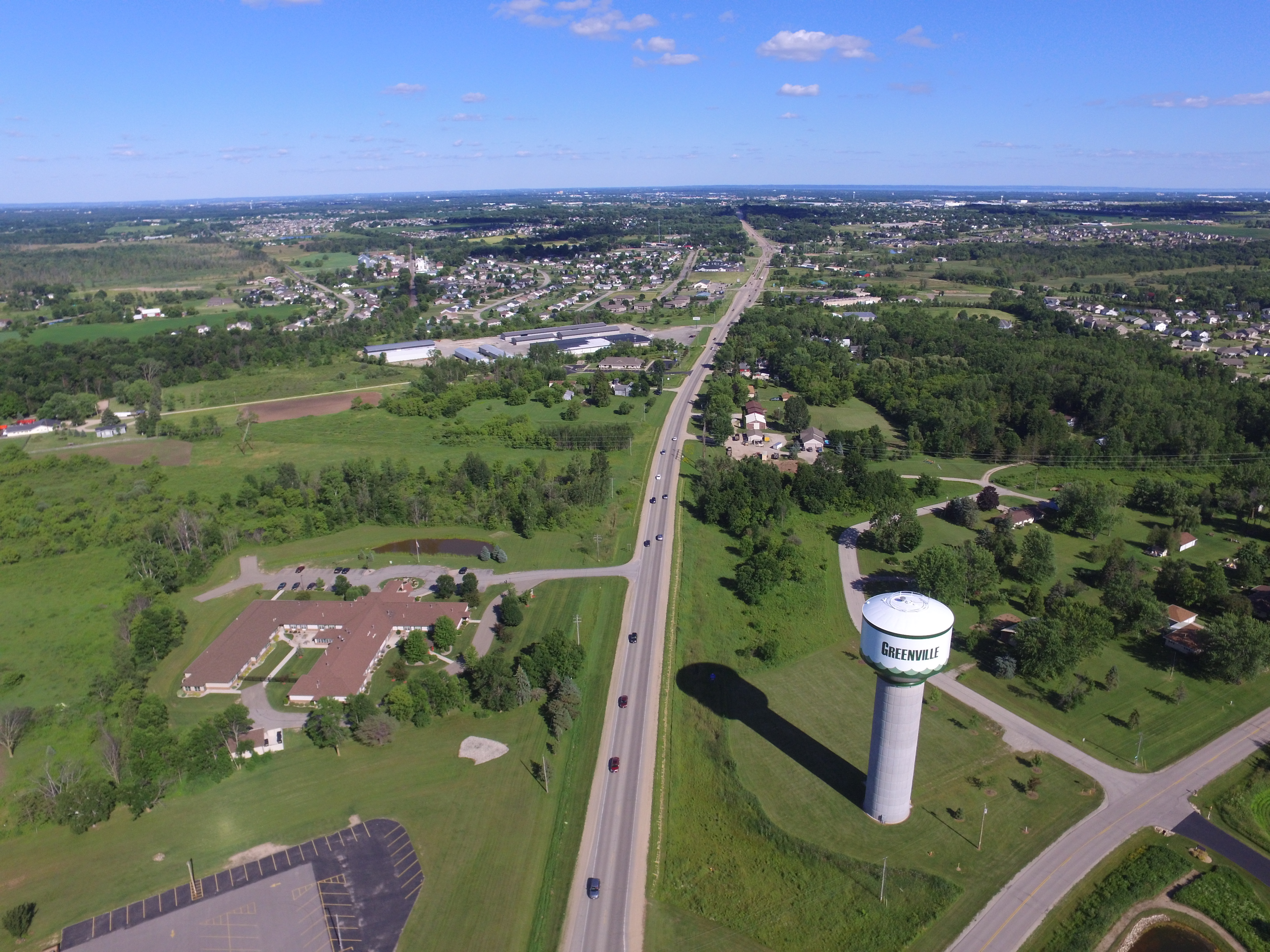
Aerial view of the town of Greenville

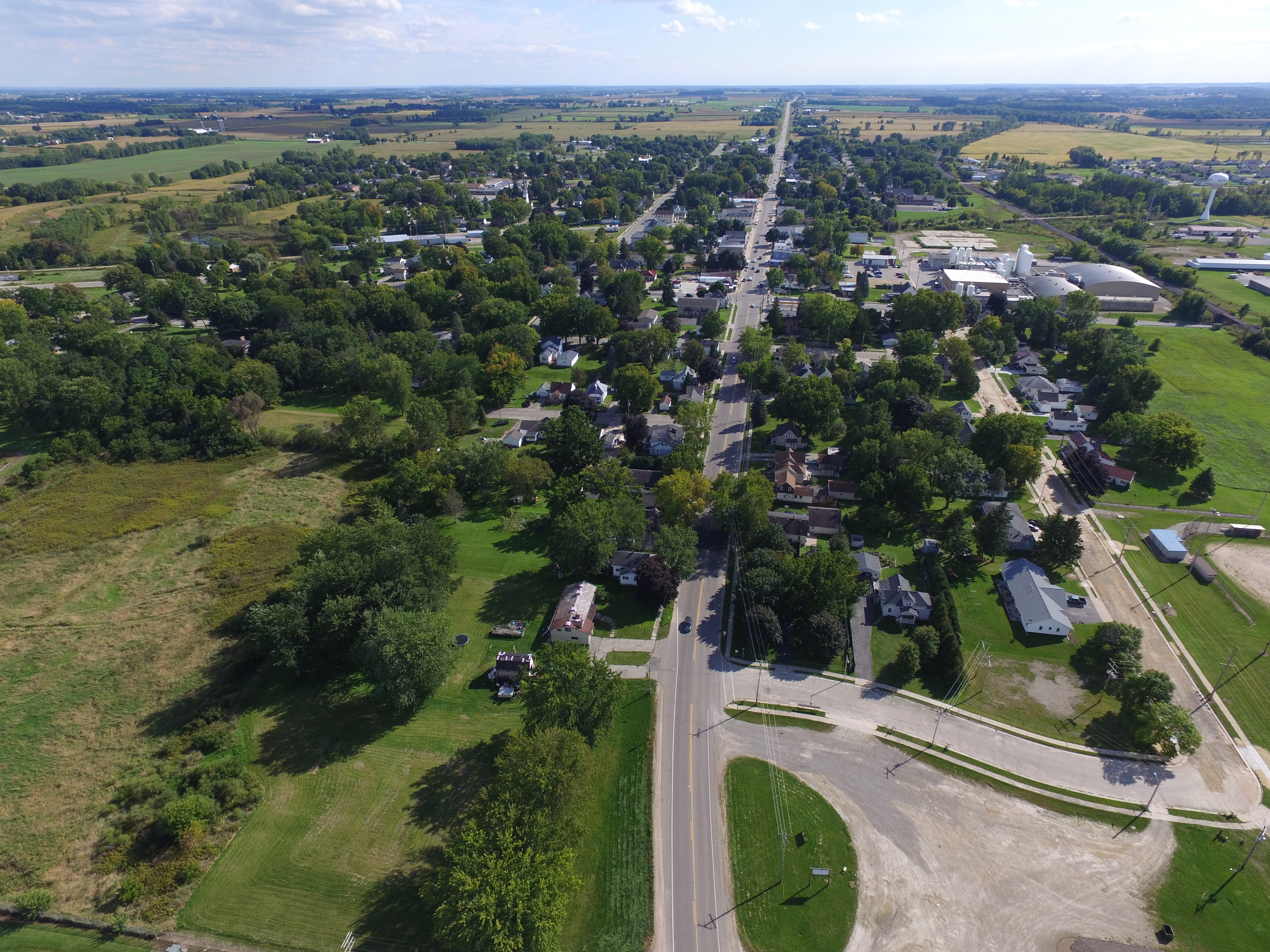
Black Creek

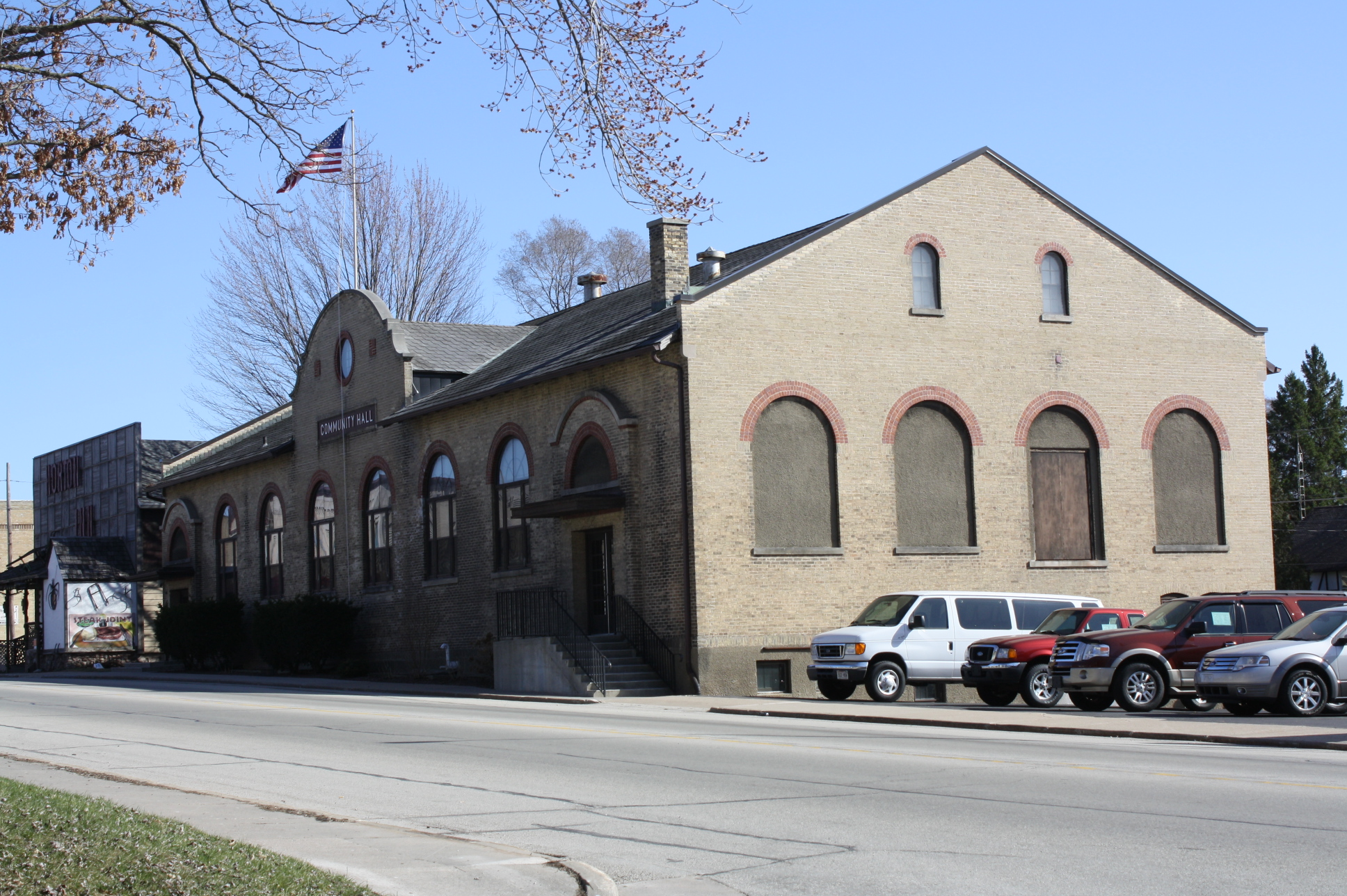
Hortonville Community Hall

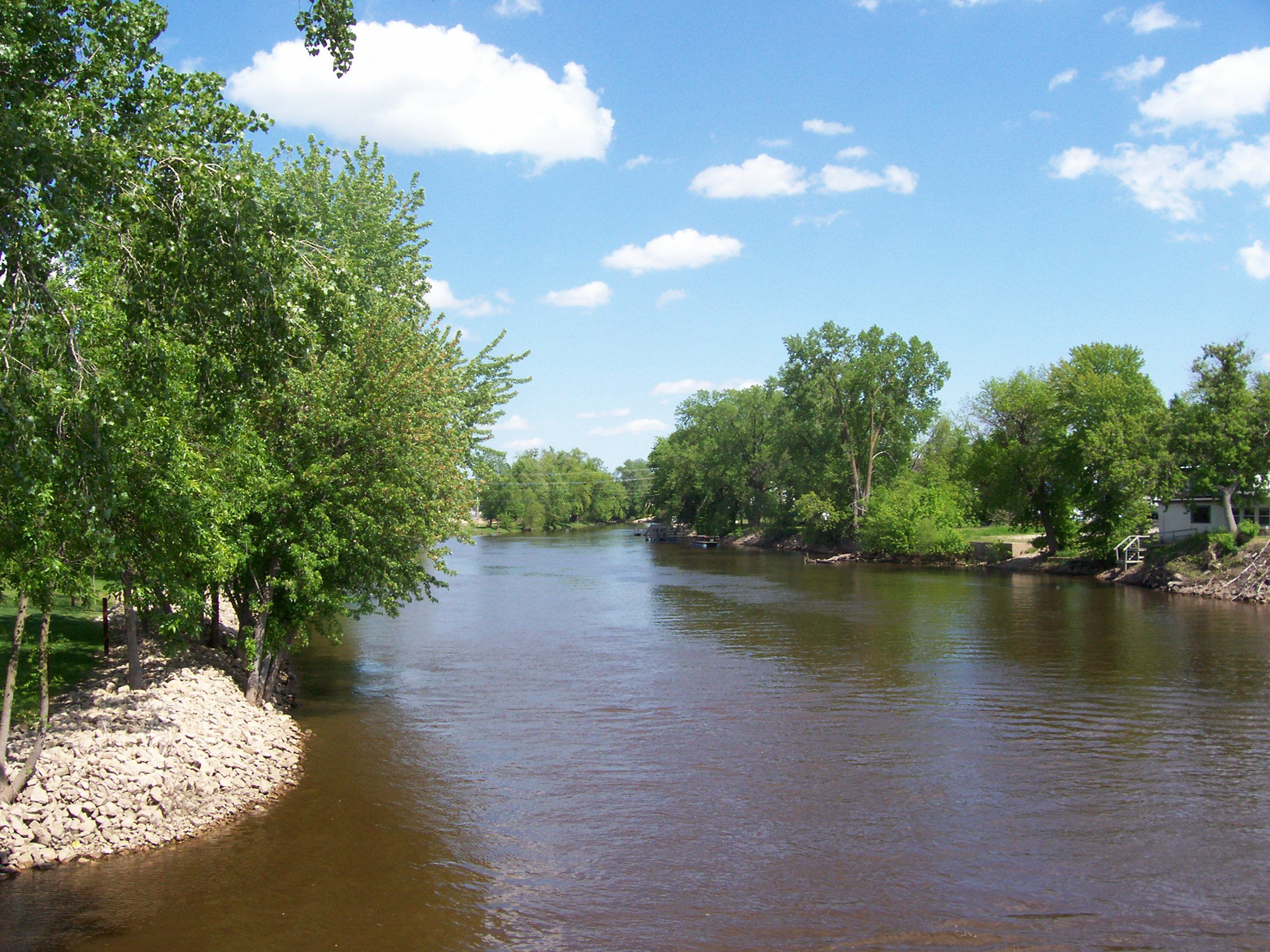
Wolf River in New London

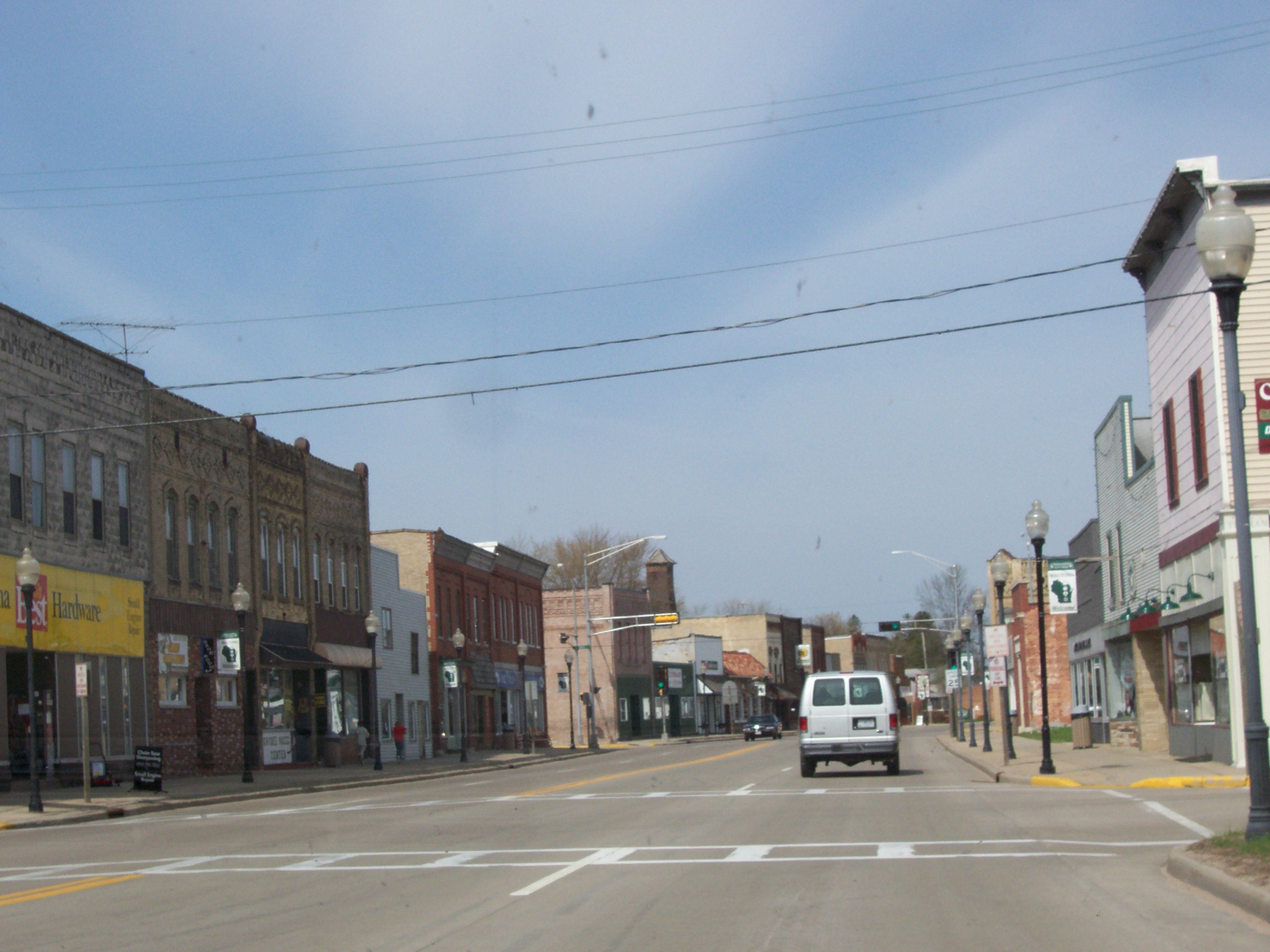
Downtown Wautoma

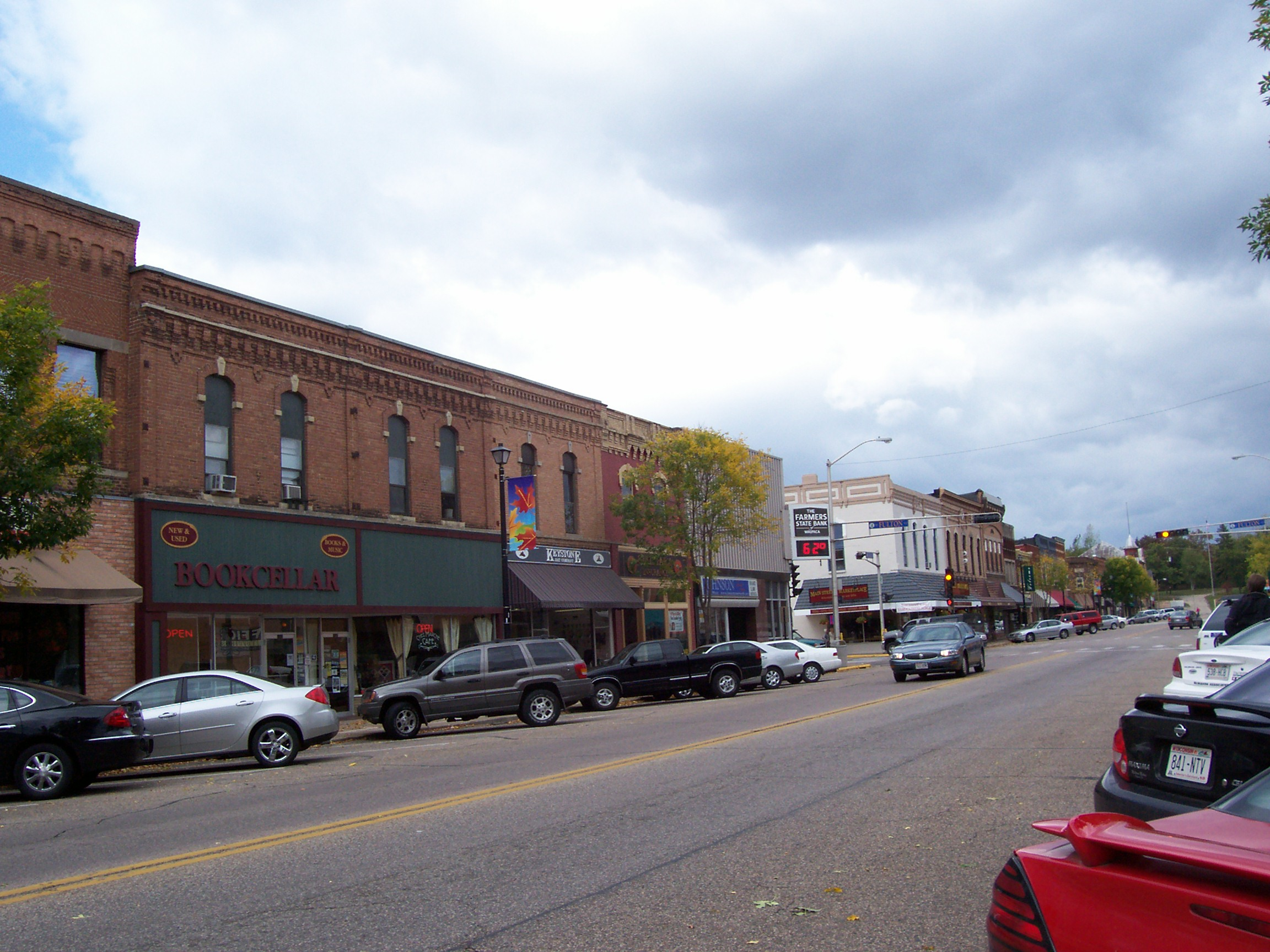
Main Street Historic District in Waupaca

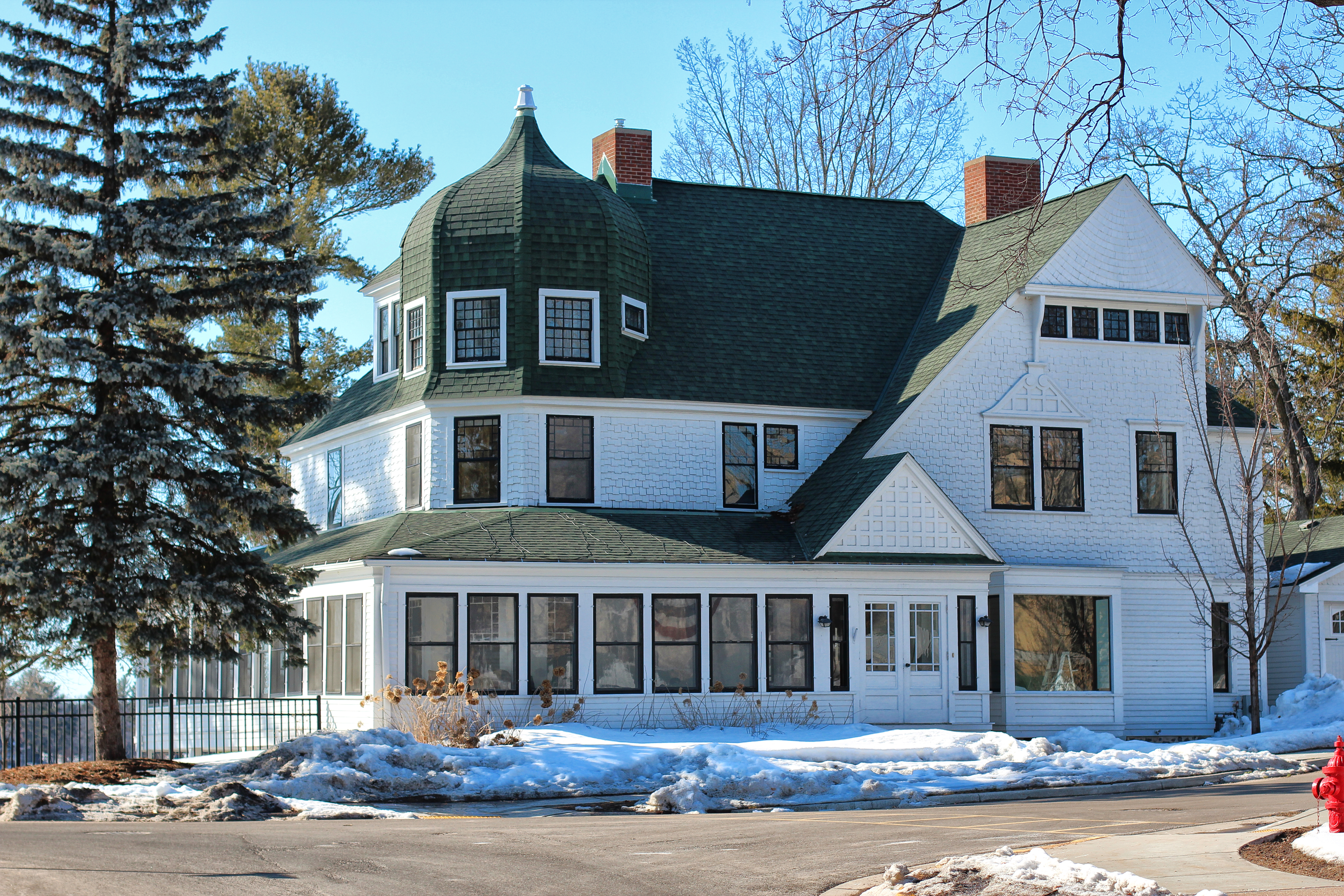
Commandant's Residence Home in the Historic Wisconsin Veterans Home

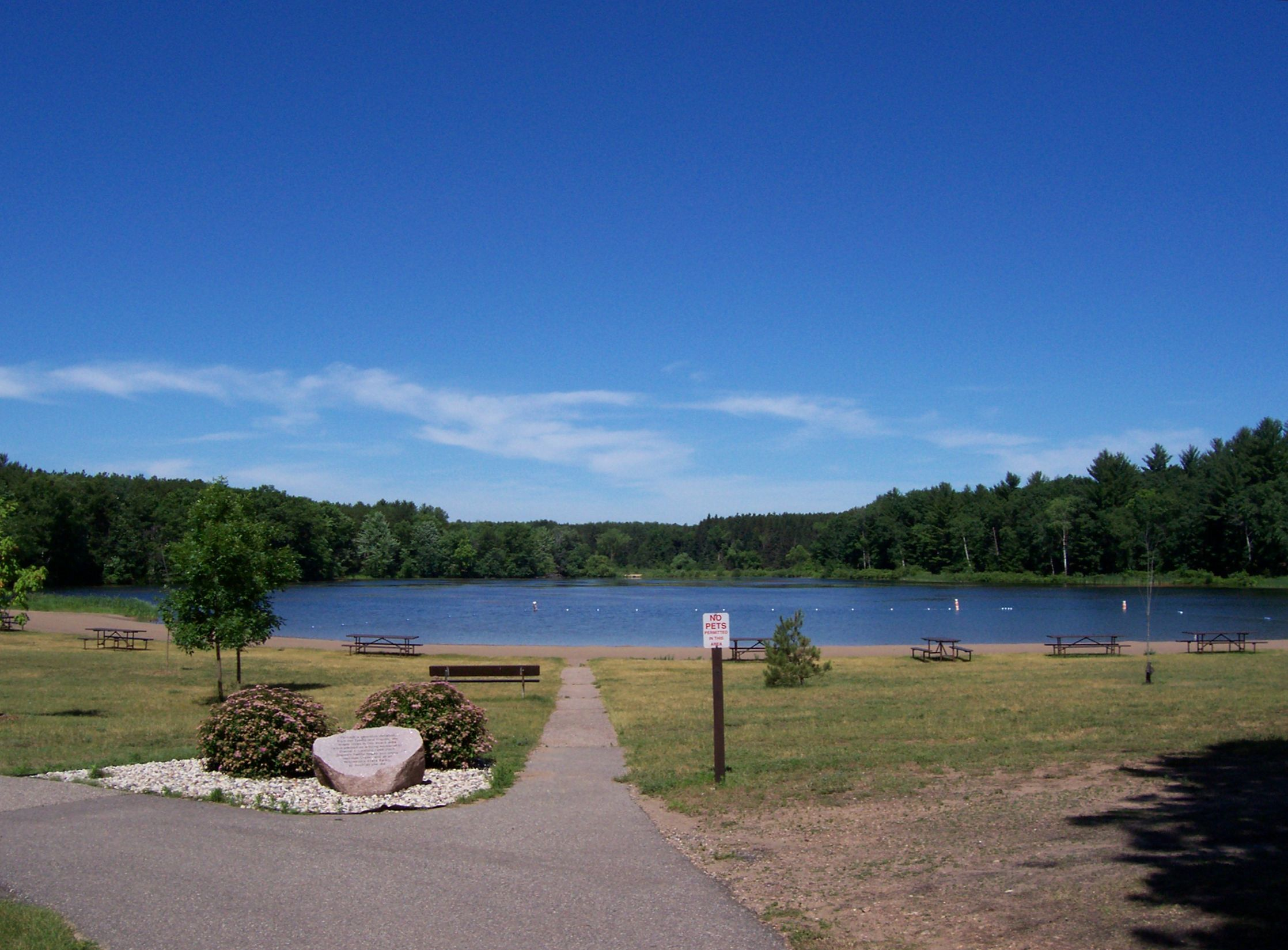
Hartman Creek State Park

== Past senators ==
Past senators include:

Note: the boundaries of districts have changed repeatedly over history. Previous politicians of a specific numbered district have represented a completely different geographic area, due to redistricting.

Senator	Party	Notes	Session	Years	District Definition
District created				1848	Northern Milwaukee County: Town of Granville; Town of Milwaukee; Town of Wauwatosa; Wards 1, 2, city of Milwaukee
Riley N. Messenger	Dem.		1st	1848	Northern Milwaukee County: Town of Granville; Town of Milwaukee; Town of Wauwatosa; Wards 1, 2, city of Milwaukee
John B. Smith	Dem.		2nd	1849	Northern Milwaukee County: Town of Granville; Town of Milwaukee; Town of Wauwatosa; Wards 1, 2, city of Milwaukee
John B. Smith	Dem.		3rd	1850	Northern Milwaukee County: Town of Granville; Town of Milwaukee; Town of Wauwatosa; Wards 1, 2, city of Milwaukee
Francis Huebschmann	Dem.		4th	1851	Northern Milwaukee County: Town of Granville; Town of Milwaukee; Town of Wauwatosa; Wards 1, 2, city of Milwaukee
Francis Huebschmann	Dem.		5th	1852	Northern Milwaukee County: Town of Granville; Town of Milwaukee; Town of Wauwatosa; Wards 1, 2, city of Milwaukee
Benjamin Allen	Dem.		6th	1853	Bad Ax, Chippewa, Crawford, La Crosse, La Pointe, St. Croix counties
Benjamin Allen	Dem.		7th	1854	Bad Ax, Chippewa, Crawford, La Crosse, La Pointe, St. Croix counties
William J. Gibson	Dem.		8th	1855	Bad Ax, Chippewa, Crawford, La Crosse, La Pointe, St. Croix counties
William J. Gibson	Dem.		9th	1856	Bad Ax, Chippewa, Crawford, La Crosse, La Pointe, St. Croix counties
Temple Clark	Dem.		10th	1857	1856–1860 1861–1865; Calumet and Manitowoc counties
Temple Clark	Dem.		11th	1858	1856–1860 1861–1865; Calumet and Manitowoc counties
Samuel H. Thurber	Dem.		12th	1859	1856–1860 1861–1865; Calumet and Manitowoc counties
Samuel H. Thurber	Dem.		13th	1860	1856–1860 1861–1865; Calumet and Manitowoc counties
Benjamin Sweet	Rep.	Resigned July 1861.	14th	1861	1856–1860 1861–1865; Calumet and Manitowoc counties
--Vacant--			14th	1861	1856–1860 1861–1865; Calumet and Manitowoc counties
George A. Jenkins	Rep.		15th	1862	1856–1860 1861–1865; Calumet and Manitowoc counties
Joseph Vilas	Dem.		16th	1863	1856–1860 1861–1865; Calumet and Manitowoc counties
Joseph Vilas	Dem.		17th	1864	1856–1860 1861–1865; Calumet and Manitowoc counties
George B. Reed	Dem.		18th	1865	1856–1860 1861–1865; Calumet and Manitowoc counties
George B. Reed	Dem.		19th	1866	1856–1860 1861–1865; Calumet and Manitowoc counties
George B. Reed	Dem.		20th	1867	Manitowoc County
George B. Reed	Dem.		21st	1868	Manitowoc County
George B. Reed	Dem.		22nd	1869	Manitowoc County
George B. Reed	Dem.		23rd	1870	Manitowoc County
Carl H. Schmidt	Dem.	Redistricted to the 15th district	24th	1871	Manitowoc County
James H. Foster	Rep.	Redistricted from the 21st district	25th	1872	1871–1875 1876–1881 1882–1887; Winnebago County; 1885 population: 50,395
Robert McCurdy	Rep.		26th	1873	1871–1875 1876–1881 1882–1887; Winnebago County; 1885 population: 50,395
Robert McCurdy	Rep.		27th	1874	1871–1875 1876–1881 1882–1887; Winnebago County; 1885 population: 50,395
William P. Rounds	Rep.		28th	1875	1871–1875 1876–1881 1882–1887; Winnebago County; 1885 population: 50,395
William P. Rounds	Rep.		29th	1876	1871–1875 1876–1881 1882–1887; Winnebago County; 1885 population: 50,395
Return Torrey	Rep.		30th	1877	1871–1875 1876–1881 1882–1887; Winnebago County; 1885 population: 50,395
Return Torrey	Rep.		31st	1878	1871–1875 1876–1881 1882–1887; Winnebago County; 1885 population: 50,395
Andrew Haben	Dem.		32nd	1879	1871–1875 1876–1881 1882–1887; Winnebago County; 1885 population: 50,395
Andrew Haben	Dem.		33rd	1880	1871–1875 1876–1881 1882–1887; Winnebago County; 1885 population: 50,395
Joseph B. Hamilton	Rep.		34th	1881	1871–1875 1876–1881 1882–1887; Winnebago County; 1885 population: 50,395
Joseph B. Hamilton	Rep.		35th	1882	1871–1875 1876–1881 1882–1887; Winnebago County; 1885 population: 50,395
Thomas Wall	Dem.		36th	1883–1884	1871–1875 1876–1881 1882–1887; Winnebago County; 1885 population: 50,395
Thomas Wall	Dem.		37th	1885–1886	1871–1875 1876–1881 1882–1887; Winnebago County; 1885 population: 50,395
George H. Buckstaff	Rep.		38th	1887–1888	Most of Winnebago County (excluding Menasha)
George H. Buckstaff	Rep.		39th	1889–1890	Most of Winnebago County (excluding Menasha)
George White Pratt	Dem.		40th	1891–1892	Most of Winnebago County (excluding Menasha)
George White Pratt	Dem.		41st	1893–1894	Winnebago County; 1890 population: 50,097; 1900 population: 58,225; 1910 population: 62,116
Charles W. Davis	Rep.		42nd	1895–1896	Winnebago County; 1890 population: 50,097; 1900 population: 58,225; 1910 population: 62,116
Charles W. Davis	Rep.		43rd	1897–1898	Winnebago County; 1890 population: 50,097; 1900 population: 58,225; 1910 population: 62,116
Henry I. Weed	Dem.		44th	1899–1900	Winnebago County; 1890 population: 50,097; 1900 population: 58,225; 1910 population: 62,116
Henry I. Weed	Dem.		45th	1901–1902	Winnebago County; 1890 population: 50,097; 1900 population: 58,225; 1910 population: 62,116
Christian Sarau	Rep.	Died Aug. 1903.	46th	1903–1904	Winnebago County; 1890 population: 50,097; 1900 population: 58,225; 1910 population: 62,116
--Vacant--			46th	1903–1904	Winnebago County; 1890 population: 50,097; 1900 population: 58,225; 1910 population: 62,116
Ephraim Stevens	Rep.	Won 1904 special election.	46th	1903–1904	Winnebago County; 1890 population: 50,097; 1900 population: 58,225; 1910 population: 62,116
Ephraim Stevens	Rep.	Won 1904 special election.	47th	1905–1906	Winnebago County; 1890 population: 50,097; 1900 population: 58,225; 1910 population: 62,116
John A. Fridd	Rep.		48th	1907–1908	Winnebago County; 1890 population: 50,097; 1900 population: 58,225; 1910 population: 62,116
John A. Fridd	Rep.		49th	1909–1910	Winnebago County; 1890 population: 50,097; 1900 population: 58,225; 1910 population: 62,116
Merritt F. White	Rep.		50th	1911–1912	Winnebago County; 1890 population: 50,097; 1900 population: 58,225; 1910 population: 62,116
Merritt F. White	Rep.		51st	1913–1914	Winnebago County; 1890 population: 50,097; 1900 population: 58,225; 1910 population: 62,116
William M. Bray	Rep.		52nd	1915–1916	Winnebago County; 1890 population: 50,097; 1900 population: 58,225; 1910 population: 62,116
William M. Bray	Rep.		53rd	1917–1918	Winnebago County; 1890 population: 50,097; 1900 population: 58,225; 1910 population: 62,116
Julius H. Dennhardt	Rep.		54th	1919–1920	Winnebago County; 1890 population: 50,097; 1900 population: 58,225; 1910 population: 62,116
Julius H. Dennhardt	Rep.		55th	1921–1922	Winnebago County; 1890 population: 50,097; 1900 population: 58,225; 1910 population: 62,116
Merritt F. White	Rep.		56th	1923–1924	Calumet and Winnebago counties
Merritt F. White	Rep.		57th	1925–1926	Calumet and Winnebago counties
Merritt F. White	Rep.		58th	1927–1928	Calumet and Winnebago counties
Merritt F. White	Rep.		59th	1929–1930	Calumet and Winnebago counties
Merritt F. White	Rep.		60th	1931–1932	Calumet and Winnebago counties
Merritt F. White	Rep.		61st	1933–1934	Calumet and Winnebago counties
Pierce A. Morrissey	Dem.		62nd	1935–1936	Calumet and Winnebago counties
Pierce A. Morrissey	Dem.		63rd	1937–1938	Calumet and Winnebago counties
Taylor G. Brown	Rep.		64th	1939–1940	Calumet and Winnebago counties
Taylor G. Brown	Rep.		65th	1941–1942	Calumet and Winnebago counties
Taylor G. Brown	Rep.		66th	1943–1944	Calumet and Winnebago counties
Taylor G. Brown	Rep.		67th	1945–1946	Calumet and Winnebago counties
Taylor G. Brown	Rep.		68th	1947–1948	Calumet and Winnebago counties
Taylor G. Brown	Rep.		69th	1949–1950	Calumet and Winnebago counties
William Draheim	Dem.		70th	1951–1952	Calumet and Winnebago counties
William Draheim	Dem.		71st	1953–1954	Calumet and Winnebago counties
William Draheim	Rep.		72nd	1955–1956	Calumet and Winnebago counties
William Draheim	Rep.		73rd	1957–1958	Calumet and Winnebago counties
William Draheim	Rep.		74th	1959–1960	Calumet and Winnebago counties
William Draheim	Rep.		75th	1961–1962	Calumet and Winnebago counties
William Draheim	Rep.		76th	1963–1964	Calumet and Winnebago counties
William Draheim	Rep.		77th	1965–1966	Winnebago County
William Draheim	Rep.		78th	1967–1968	Winnebago County
William Draheim	Rep.		79th	1969–1970	Winnebago County
Jack D. Steinhilber	Rep.		80th	1971–1972	Winnebago County
Jack D. Steinhilber	Rep.		81st	1973–1974	Most of Winnebago County; Part of Fond du Lac County
Gary Goyke	Dem.		82nd	1975–1976	Most of Winnebago County; Part of Fond du Lac County
Gary Goyke	Dem.		83rd	1977–1978	Most of Winnebago County; Part of Fond du Lac County
Gary Goyke	Dem.		84th	1979–1980	Most of Winnebago County; Part of Fond du Lac County
Gary Goyke	Dem.		85th	1981–1982	Most of Winnebago County; Part of Fond du Lac County
Michael G. Ellis	Rep.		86th	1983–1984	Northeast Winnebago County: Town of Clayton; Town of Menasha; Town of Neenah; Town of Oshkosh; Town of Vinland; Town of Winchester; Town of Winneconne; Village of Winneconne; City of Menasha; City of Neenah; Wards 29-34, 37, 41-43, City of Oshkosh; Part of Outagamie County: Town of Grand Chute; Wards 1, 3, 4, 6-8, 12, 14-19, City of Appleton
Michael G. Ellis	Rep.		87th	1985–1986	Most of Winnebago County; Southern Outagamie County; Western Fond du Lac County
Michael G. Ellis	Rep.		88th	1987–1988	Most of Winnebago County; Southern Outagamie County; Western Fond du Lac County
Michael G. Ellis	Rep.		89th	1989–1990	Most of Winnebago County; Southern Outagamie County; Western Fond du Lac County
Michael G. Ellis	Rep.		90th	1991–1992	Most of Winnebago County; Southern Outagamie County; Western Fond du Lac County
Michael G. Ellis	Rep.		91st	1993–1994	Northern Winnebago County; Southern Outagamie County
Michael G. Ellis	Rep.		92nd	1995–1996	Northern Winnebago County; Southern Outagamie County
Michael G. Ellis	Rep.		93rd	1997–1998	Northern Winnebago County; Southern Outagamie County
Michael G. Ellis	Rep.		94th	1999–2000	Northern Winnebago County; Southern Outagamie County
Michael G. Ellis	Rep.		95th	2001–2002	Northern Winnebago County; Southern Outagamie County
Michael G. Ellis	Rep.		96th	2003–2004	Northern Winnebago County; Southern Outagamie County
Michael G. Ellis	Rep.		97th	2005–2006	Northern Winnebago County; Southern Outagamie County
Michael G. Ellis	Rep.		98th	2007–2008	Northern Winnebago County; Southern Outagamie County
Michael G. Ellis	Rep.		99th	2009–2010	Northern Winnebago County; Southern Outagamie County
Michael G. Ellis	Rep.		100th	2011–2012	Northern Winnebago County; Southern Outagamie County
Michael G. Ellis	Rep.		101st	2013–2014	Northern Winnebago County; Southern Outagamie County
Roger Roth	Rep.		102nd	2015–2016	Northern Winnebago County; Southern Outagamie County
Roger Roth	Rep.		103rd	2017–2018	Northern Winnebago County; Southern Outagamie County
Roger Roth	Rep.		104th	2019–2020	Northern Winnebago County; Southern Outagamie County
Roger Roth	Rep.		105th	2021–2022	Northern Winnebago County; Southern Outagamie County
Rachael Cabral-Guevara	Rep.	Elected 2022.	106th	2023–2024	Northern Winnebago County; Southern Outagamie County
Rachael Cabral-Guevara	Rep.	Elected 2022.	107th	2025–2026	Waushara County most of Winnebago County western Outagamie County southern Waupaca County part of eastern Adams County part of southeast Portage County
