= K. J. Callahan =

20th century American politician

County Judge of Marquette County, Wisconsin
- In office January 1, 1938 – November 30, 1966
- Preceded by: John A. Metzler
- Succeeded by: Andrew P. Cotter

Member of the Wisconsin State Assembly from the Adams–Marquette district
- In office January 5, 1931 – January 7, 1935
- Preceded by: George W. Bingham
- Succeeded by: Edwin W. Blomquist

District Attorney of Marquette County, Wisconsin
- In office January 1, 1925 – January 1, 1931
- Preceded by: Rell Conant
- Succeeded by: John A. Conant

Personal details
- Born: November 17, 1896 Montello, Wisconsin, U.S.
- Died: July 26, 1985 (aged 88) Portage, Wisconsin, U.S.
- Resting place: Saint John the Baptist Cemetery, Montello
- Party: Republican
- Spouse: Luella N. Retzner (m. 1945; died 1977)
- Children: none
- Education: Oshkosh State Teachers College; University of Wisconsin Law School
- Profession: Lawyer

John Kevin "K. J." Callahan (November 17, 1896 – July 26, 1985) was an American lawyer and Republican politician from Marquette County, Wisconsin. He served two terms in the Wisconsin State Assembly, from 1931 to 1935, then served 28 years as county judge of Marquette County, retiring in 1966.

== Biography ==
K. J. Callahan was born in Montello, Wisconsin, in November 1896. He graduated from Montbello High School in 1914 and went on to attend Oshkosh State Teachers College (now University of Wisconsin–Oshkosh), where he graduated in 1918. He went on to the University of Wisconsin Law School, graduated in 1924. Later that year, he was elected district attorney of Marquette County, and served six years, leaving office when he was elected to the Wisconsin State Assembly in 1930.

Running as an Independent Republican, he defeated Democrat John A. Cadigan in the 1930 election. He was re-elected in 1932, defeating Democrat H. F. Fredericks.

Rather than running for another term in the Assembly in 1934, he ran for Wisconsin Senate in the 31st Senate district, but lost the general election to Progressive candidate James Earl Leverich.

He returned to elected office in January 1938, after being elected county judge of Marquette County. He served as county judge for the next 28 years, retiring November 30, 1966. He remained a reserve judge for another 17 years after his retirement until finally ending his service in 1983.

He died at Divine Savior Hospital in Portage, Wisconsin, on the morning of July 26, 1985.

Wisconsin State Assembly
Preceded by George W. Bingham	Member of the Wisconsin State Assembly from the Adams–Marquette district January 5, 1931 – January 7, 1935	Succeeded by Edwin W. Blomquist
Legal offices
Preceded by Rell Conant	District Attorney of Marquette County, Wisconsin; January 1, 1925 – January 1, 1931	Succeeded by John A. Conant
Preceded by John A. Metzler	County Judge of Marquette County, Wisconsin; January 1, 1938 – November 30, 1966	Succeeded by Andrew P. Cotter
