= Sherman W. Wade =

American politician

Sherman W. Wade (December 12, 1895 – December 11, 1969) was a member of the Wisconsin State Senate.

== Biography ==
Wade was born on December 12, 1895, in Hurley, Wisconsin. During World War I, he served in the United States Army's 102nd Squadron. He died on December 11, 1969.

== Political career ==
Wade was elected to the Senate in 1932. He was a Democrat.
