= Fred W. Zantow =

American politician (1879–1934)

Fred W. Zantow (February 24, 1879 – November 14, 1934) was an American politician.

== Biography ==
Born in the Town of Sumpter, Sauk County, Wisconsin, Zantow went to Sauk City High School. He was involved with various farm organizations and was an advocate of the contract system of cooperative marketing. Zantow was a supporter of United States Senator Robert M. La Follette Jr. Zantow served in the Wisconsin State Senate from 1931 until 1934 and was elected as a Republican. He had been reelected on the Progressive ticket in 1934. Zantow died in a hospital in Madison, Wisconsin following surgery. He had been in ill health.
