= Roland E. Kannenberg =

American politician

Roland E. Kannenberg (September 25, 1907 – November 15, 1983) was a politician in the state of Wisconsin.

== Biography ==
Kannenberg was born Roland Ellsworth Harry Kannenberg on September 25, 1907 in Kenosha County, Wisconsin. His brother, John, served as Mayor of Wausau, Wisconsin, and his niece, Natalie, was a delegate to the 2000 Democratic National Convention. His daughter, Gloria, became a noted composer. In 1943, he moved to Mercer, Wisconsin and operated a bar and grill. Kannenberg died from cancer on November 15, 1983 in Madison, Wisconsin.

== Career ==
Kannenberg served in the Wisconsin State Senate from 1935 to 1939. In 1937 he was accused of engaging in logrolling tactics. In 1956, he unsuccessfully ran for re-election to the Senate. Kannenberg had also been a candidate for the United States House of Representatives from Wisconsin's 10th congressional district, losing to incumbent Alvin E. O'Konski. Additionally, he served as Mercer Town Chairman and on the Iron County, Wisconsin Board of Supervisors. Kannenberg was also involved with the Wisconsin Progressive Party.
