= Isaac C. Evans =

20th century American politician

Isaac C. Evans (January 17, 1879 – January 25, 1954) was an American farmer and Democratic politician.

Born in Spring Green, Wisconsin, he was a member of the Wisconsin State Assembly for the 1933–1934 session, representing Sauk County. He attended the University of Wisconsin–Madison and was a farmer and livestock dealer.
