= Merritt F. White =

American politician

Merritt F. White (August 26, 1865 – July 28, 1934) was a member of the Wisconsin Senate.

== Biography ==
White was born on August 26, 1865, in Winneconne, Wisconsin. He attended the University of Wisconsin-Oshkosh. White died on July 28, 1934.

== Career ==
White represented the 19th district in the Senate. Additionally, he was President of Winneconne and a member of the Winnebago County, Wisconsin Board. He was a Republican.
