= William Draheim =

American politician

William Draheim was a member of the Wisconsin State Senate.

== Biography ==
Draheim was born on December 15, 1898, in Neenah, Wisconsin. After graduating from Neenah High School, he attended Lawrence University. Draheim served in the United States Army and the Wisconsin Army National Guard, taking part in World War I and World War II and achieving the rank of major.

== Political career ==
Draheim was a candidate for the Wisconsin State Assembly in 1938 as a Democrat and in 1948 as an Independent. In 1950, Draheim was elected to the Senate representing the 19th district as a Democrat. In following years, he was re-elected as a Republican. Additionally, he was a member of the Winnebago County, Wisconsin Board of Supervisors from 1938 to 1940 and again from 1948 to 1950. Draheim died on August 10, 1976, in Neenah, Wisconsin.
