= Otto Mueller (politician) =

American politician and businessman

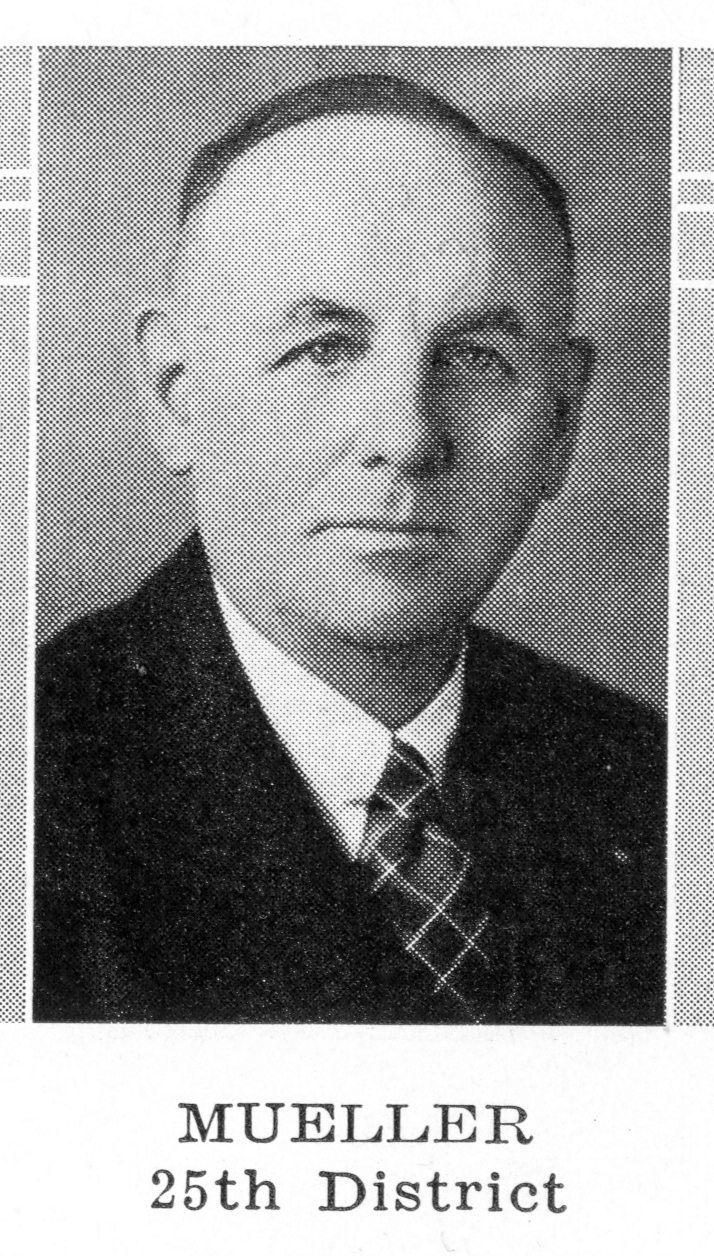
Otto Mueller

Otto Mueller (December 19, 1875 – January 9, 1973) was an American Republican politician and businessman from Wisconsin.

== Career ==
Born in Wausau, Wisconsin, Mueller was a jeweler in Wausau. He served on the Marathon County, Wisconsin Board of Supervisors. He served in the Wisconsin State Senate 1927-1933 and 1939–1941.

== Recall election ==
In 1932, Mueller survived a recall election.
