= Joseph L. Garvens =

American politician

Joseph L. Garvens (April 20, 1886 - July 1974) was a member of the Wisconsin State Assembly.

Garvens was born on April 20, 1886, in Elm Grove, Wisconsin. He attended a parochial school.

== Career ==
Garvens was a member of the Assembly during the 1933, 1935 and 1937 sessions. He was a Democrat.
