= Ira E. Inman =

American politician

Ira E. Inman (December 7, 1868 – December 1, 1954) was an American farmer and politician.

Born in the Town of Plymouth, Rock County, Wisconsin, Inman was a farmer and raised brown Swiss cattle. From 1933 to 1937, Inman served in the Wisconsin State Assembly and was a Republican. From 1942 until 1951, he served on the Wisconsin Board of Agriculture and was chairman. Inman died at his home in Beloit, Wisconsin.
