= Thomas H. Caffrey =

American politician

Thomas H. Caffrey (October 3, 1893 - October 1963) was a member of the Wisconsin State Assembly.

== Biography ==
Caffrey was born on October 3, 1893, in South Bound Brook, New Jersey. He graduated from high school in Milwaukee, Wisconsin. During World War I, he served in the United States Army.

== Political career ==
Caffrey represented the Fifteenth District of Milwaukee County, Wisconsin in the Assembly. He was a Democrat.
