= John Anderson (Wisconsin politician, born 1870) =

American politician from Wisconsin

John A. Anderson (December 28, 1870, in Carver County, Minnesota – August 7, 1954), was a member of the Wisconsin State Senate. He attended Gustavus Adolphus College.

== Career ==
Anderson was elected to the Senate in 1930 on the Republican Party ticket. He was re-elected in 1934 running on the Wisconsin Progressive Party ticket. Additionally, he was a member of the school board and mayor of Barron, Wisconsin. He was a Republican.

Anderson later moved to Los Angeles, California, where he became involved in real estate. He died in his home there.
