= Pierce A. Morrissey =

American politician

Pierce A. Morrissey (April 15, 1870 – 1956) was a member of the Wisconsin State Senate.

== Biography ==
Born in Nepeuskun, Wisconsin, Morrissey attended school in Waukau, Wisconsin.

== Career ==
Morrissey represented the 19th district in the Senate. Previously, he was Assessor of Nepeuskun from 1912 to 1917 and Chairman and a member of the Board of Supervisors in 1922. He was a Democrat.

Morrisey died in 1956, an application for probate of his will being filed in November of that year.
