= George Engebretson =

American politician

George Engebretson (June 3, 1890 - November 19, 1961) was a member of the Wisconsin State Senate.

== Biography ==
Engebretson was born in Warren, Illinois. He later moved with his family to Wiota, Wisconsin and attended the University of Wisconsin-Platteville. He was a farmer and insurance agent. Engebretson died in a hospital in Monroe, Wisconsin.

== Career ==
Engebretson was elected to the Senate representing the 17th district as a Republican in 1932. He was defeated for re-election in 1938 as a member of the Wisconsin Progressive Party.

== Family ==
His father was Julius M. Engebretson who served in the Wisconsin State Assembly.
