= Herman J. Severson =

American judge and politician (1869–1950)

The Honorable Herman J. Severson
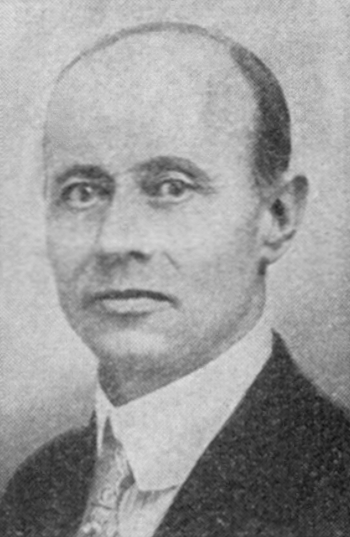

Wisconsin Circuit Court Judge for the 7th Circuit
- In office January 1, 1939 – September 2, 1950
- Preceded by: Byron B. Park
- Succeeded by: Herbert A. Bunde

Member of the Wisconsin Senate from the 23rd district
- In office January 6, 1919 – January 1, 1939
- Preceded by: Andrew R. Potts
- Succeeded by: Fred R. Fisher

District Attorney of Waupaca County, Wisconsin
- In office January 4, 1909 – January 6, 1919
- Preceded by: William N. Martin
- Succeeded by: Otto L. Olen

Personal details
- Born: November 19, 1869 Christiana, Dane County, Wisconsin
- Died: September 2, 1950 (aged 80) Iola, Wisconsin
- Resting place: Our Savior Lutheran Cemetery, Iola, Wisconsin
- Party: Wisconsin Progressive; Republican (before 1936)
- Spouse: Anne Severson (died 1960)
- Education: University of Wisconsin Law School
- Profession: lawyer, politician, judge

Herman John Severson (November 19, 1869 – September 2, 1950) was an American attorney, judge, and Progressive Republican politician. He was a Wisconsin circuit court judge for the last 12 years of his life after serving 20 years in the Wisconsin State Senate.

== Biography ==
Born in the Town of Christiana, Dane County, Wisconsin, Severson grew up on his father's farm and then went to Stoughton Normal Institute, Red Wing College, Drake University and then received his law degree from University of Wisconsin Law School. He also taught school and was principal of a school in London, Wisconsin. Severson practiced law in Iola, Wisconsin, and was district attorney of Waupaca County, Wisconsin from 1908 to 1916 and was a Republican. Severson was president of the Iola State Bank and the Herald Publishing Company. Then from 1918 to 1938, Severson served in the Wisconsin State Senate and was involved with the Wisconsin Progressive Party. In 1938, Severson was elected a Wisconsin Circuit Court judge and served until 1950, when he died in office. Severson died in Iola, Wisconsin.
