= Harold V. Schoenecker =

American lawyer and politician

Harold Vincent Schoenecker (November 26, 1902 – November 19, 1989) was an American lawyer and politician.

Born in Milwaukee, Wisconsin, Schoenecker received his bachelor's degree from Marquette University, in 1925, and his law degree from Marquette University Law School, in 1935. He worked for his father at the V. Schoenecker Boot and Shoe Company and then practiced law. In 1935, he served in the Wisconsin State Senate as a Democrat.
