= Alexander Paul =

American politician

Alexander M. Paul (November 30, 1875 – May 19, 1954) was an American farmer, businessman, and politician.

Born in Milton Junction, Wisconsin, Paul attended local schools. He became a farmer like his father. He also became a businessman, involved in banking and insurance.

He was elected to the Wisconsin State Assembly as a Democrat in 1931, serving one term. He was elected to the Wisconsin State Senate in 1933, again serving one term.

He was appointed as acting postmaster of Milton Junction, Wisconsin. Paul died in Edgerton, Wisconsin.
