= 66th Wisconsin Legislature =

Wisconsin legislative term for 1943–1944

←	65th	67th	→
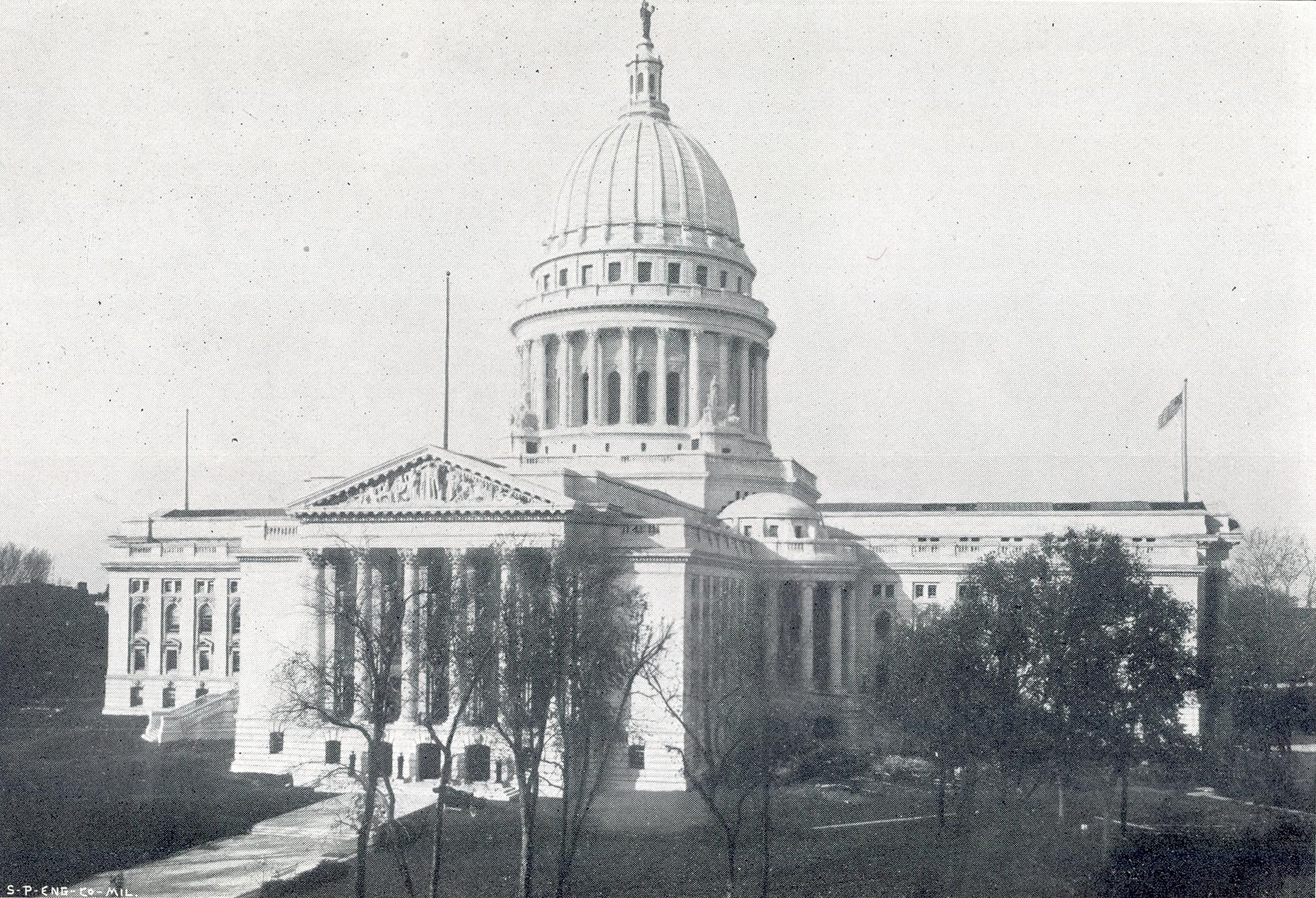
- Wisconsin State Capitol ca.1915

Overview
- Legislative body: Wisconsin Legislature
- Meeting place: Wisconsin State Capitol
- Term: January 4, 1943 – January 1, 1945
- Election: November 3, 1942

Senate
- Members: 33
- Senate President: --Vacant--
- President pro tempore: Conrad Shearer (R)
- Party control: Republican

Assembly
- Members: 100
- Assembly Speaker: Vernon W. Thomson (R)
- Party control: Republican

Sessions
- Regular: January 13, 1943 – January 22, 1944

The Sixty-Sixth Wisconsin Legislature convened from January 13, 1943, to January 22, 1944, in regular session.

Senators representing odd-numbered districts were newly elected for this session and were serving the first two years of a four-year term. Assembly members were elected to a two-year term. Assembly members and odd-numbered senators were elected in the general election of November 3, 1942. Senators representing even-numbered districts were serving the third and fourth year of a four-year term, having been elected in the general election of November 5, 1940.

The governor of Wisconsin during this entire term was Republican Walter Samuel Goodland, of Racine County, serving a two-year term, having won the 1942 lieutenant gubernatorial election and then being sworn in as governor following the death of the governor-elect Orland Steen Loomis.

== Major events ==
- January 4, 1943: Inauguration of Walter Samuel Goodland as the 31st Governor of Wisconsin.
- February 2, 1943: The Battle of Stalingrad came to an end with the surrender of the German 6th Army to Soviet forces.
- August 17, 1943: Allied forces completed the invasion of Sicily.
- September 3, 1943: The Kingdom of Italy surrendered to Allied forces.
- September 23, 1943: The Italian Social Republic was established by German forces in northern Italy as a puppet state of Germany.
- December 24, 1943: U.S. Army general Dwight D. Eisenhower became Supreme Allied Commander Europe.
- January 11, 1944: In his State of the Union, U.S. President Franklin Roosevelt proposed a second bill of rights for economic and social security.
- January 27, 1944: After more than two years, the Siege of Leningrad was lifted as German forces retreated.
- April 16, 1944: The battleship USS Wisconsin (BB-64) was commissioned.
- June 6, 1944: Allied forces conducted a forced amphibious landing at Normandy, opening a western front against Nazi Germany. It was the largest amphious military operation in history.
- July 22, 1944: The Bretton Woods Conference ended with agreements for regulating the international monetary and financial order after the war, leading to the establishment of the International Bank for Reconstruction and Development, the General Agreement on Tariffs and Trade, and the International Monetary Fund.
- August 25, 1944: Allied forces completed the Liberation of Paris.
- October 7, 1944: The Dumbarton Oaks Conference concluded with an agreement on a set of proposals for the postwar diplomatic and security order.
- October 26, 1944: American and Australian naval forces destroyed 28 Japanese warships at the Battle of Leyte Gulf, in what was (by some measures) the largest naval battle in history.
- November 7, 1944: 1944 United States general election:
  - Franklin D. Roosevelt (D) re-elected to a fourth term as President of the United States. The only time a U.S. president was elected to a fourth term.
  - Walter Samuel Goodland (R) elected Governor of Wisconsin
  - Alexander Wiley (R) re-elected United States senator from Wisconsin.
- December 17, 1944: The Green Bay Packers won the 1944 NFL Championship Game.

== Major legislation ==
- May 21, 1943: An Act ... relating to the creation and operation of a municipal retirement system, 1943 Act 175. Created Wisconsin's municipal employee pension system.
- May 22, 1943: An Act ... relating to a retirement system for state employes, and making an appropriation, 1943 Act 176. Created Wisconsin's state employee pension system.
- 1943 Joint Resolution 27: First legislative passage of a proposed amendment to the state constitution to abolish the office of justice of the peace in first class cities. This amendment was eventually ratified by voters at the April 1945 election.
- 1943 Joint Resolution 37: First legislative passage of a proposed amendment to the state constitution to allow the state to take on debt for the development of aeronautical facilities. This amendment was eventually ratified by voters at the April 1945 election.
- 1943 Joint Resolution 60: First legislative passage of a proposed amendment to the state constitution to remove audit powers from the Secretary of State and instead grant that authority to the Legislature. This amendment was eventually ratified by voters in two separate parts (removal from Secretary of State and authorization to the Legislature) at the November 1946 election.

== Party summary ==
=== Senate summary ===
Senate partisan composition Democratic: 4 seats Progressive: 6 seats Republican: 22 seats Vacant: 1 seat

	Party (Shading indicates majority caucus)			Total	
	Dem.	Prog.	Rep.	Total	Vacant
End of previous Legislature	3	6	23	32	1
Start of Reg. Session	4	6	23	33	0
From Apr. 30, 1943 (Note: Republican Warren P. Knowles (10th District) took leave.)	4	6	22	32	1
From Jun. 16, 1944 (Note: Republican Louis J. Fellenz Jr. (18th District) resigned.)	4	6	21	31	2
Final voting share	12.9%	19.35%	67.74%		
Beginning of the next Legislature	6	5	22	33	0

=== Assembly summary ===
Assembly partisan composition Democratic: 14 seats Progressive: 13 seats Republican: 73 seats

	Party (Shading indicates majority caucus)			Total	
	Dem.	Prog.	Rep.	Total	Vacant
End of previous Legislature	14	22	60	96	4
Start of Reg. Session	14	13	73	100	0
Final voting share	14%	13%	73%		
Beginning of the next Legislature	19	5	75	100	0

== Sessions ==
- Regular session: January 13, 1943 – January 22, 1944

== Leaders ==
=== Senate leadership ===
- President of the Senate: --Vacant--
- President pro tempore: Conrad Shearer (R–Kenosha)
- Majority leader:
  - Warren P. Knowles (R–New Richmond) (until Apr. 30, 1943)
  - John W. Byrnes (R–Green Bay) (after Apr. 30, 1943)

=== Assembly leadership ===
- Speaker of the Assembly: Vernon W. Thomson (R–Richland Center)
- Majority leader: Mark Catlin Jr. (R–Appleton)
- Minority leaders:
  - Elmer L. Genzmer (D–Mayville)
  - Lyall T. Beggs (P–Madison)

== Members ==
=== Members of the Senate ===
Members of the Senate for the Sixty-Sixth Wisconsin Legislature:

Senate partisan representation Democratic: 4 seats Progressive: 6 seats Republican: 22 seats Vacant: 1 seat

Dist.	Counties	Senator	Residence	Party
01	Door, Kewaunee, & Manitowoc	John E. Cashman	Denmark	Prog.
02	Brown & Oconto	John W. Byrnes	Green Bay	Rep.
03	Milwaukee (South City)	Clement J. Zablocki	Milwaukee	Dem.
04	Milwaukee (Northeast County & Northeast City)	Milton T. Murray	Milwaukee	Rep.
05	Milwaukee (Northwest City)	Bernhard Gettelman	Milwaukee	Rep.
06	Milwaukee (North-Central City)	George Hampel	Milwaukee	Prog.
07	Milwaukee (Southeast County & Southeast City)	Anthony P. Gawronski	Milwaukee	Dem.
08	Milwaukee (Western County)	Allen Busby	West Milwaukee	Rep.
09	Milwaukee (City Downtown)	Robert E. Tehan	Milwaukee	Dem.
10	Buffalo, Pepin, Pierce, & St. Croix	Warren P. Knowles (took leave Apr. 30, 1943)	New Richmond	Rep.
10	Buffalo, Pepin, Pierce, & St. Croix	--Vacant from Apr. 30, 1943--		
11	Bayfield, Burnett, Douglas, & Washburn	Elmer Peterson	Superior	Prog.
12	Ashland, Iron, Price, Rusk, Sawyer, & Vilas	James H. Carroll	Glidden	Rep.
13	Dodge & Washington	Frank E. Panzer	Oakfield	Rep.
14	Outagamie & Shawano	John F. Lappen	Appleton	Rep.
15	Rock	Robert P. Robinson	Beloit	Rep.
16	Crawford, Grant, & Vernon	Helmar Lewis	Boscobel	Rep.
17	Green, Iowa, & Lafayette	Melvin Olson	South Wayne	Rep.
18	Fond du Lac, Green Lake & Waushara	Louis J. Fellenz Jr. (res. Jun. 16, 1944)	Fond du Lac	Rep.
18	Fond du Lac, Green Lake & Waushara	--Vacant from Jun. 16, 1944--		
19	Calumet & Winnebago	Taylor G. Brown	Oshkosh	Rep.
20	Ozaukee & Sheboygan	Gustave W. Buchen	Sheboygan	Rep.
21	Racine	Edward F. Hilker	Racine	Rep.
22	Kenosha & Walworth	Conrad Shearer	Kenosha	Rep.
23	Portage & Waupaca	Harley M. Jacklin	Plover	Dem.
24	Clark, Taylor, & Wood	Melvin R. Laird Sr.	Marshfield	Rep.
25	Lincoln & Marathon	William McNeight	Unity	Rep.
26	Dane	Fred Risser	Madison	Prog.
27	Columbia, Richland, & Sauk	Jess Miller	Richland Center	Rep.
28	Chippewa & Eau Claire	George H. Hipke	Stanley	Rep.
29	Barron, Dunn, & Polk	Charles D. Madsen	Luck	Prog.
30	Florence, Forest, Langlade, Marinette, & Oneida	Philip Downing	Amberg	Rep.
31	Adams, Juneau, Monroe, & Marquette	J. Earl Leverich	Sparta	Prog.
32	Jackson, La Crosse, & Trempealeau	Rudolph Schlabach	La Crosse	Rep.
33	Jefferson & Waukesha	William A. Freehoff	Waukesha	Rep.

=== Members of the Assembly ===
Members of the Assembly for the Sixty-Sixth Wisconsin Legislature:

Assembly partisan composition Democratic: 14 seats Progressive: 13 seats Republican: 73 seats

Milwaukee County districts

Senate Dist.	County	Dist.	Representative	Party	Residence
31	Adams & Marquette		Robert M. Long	Rep.	Westfield
12	Ashland		John C. Chapple	Rep.	Ashland
29	Barron		Charles H. Sykes	Prog.	Cameron
11	Bayfield		Samuel E. Squires	Rep.	Bayfield
02	Brown	1	Robert E. Lynch	Dem.	Green Bay
02	Brown	2	William J. Sweeney	Dem.	De Pere
10	Buffalo & Pepin		David I. Hammergren	Rep.	Cochrane
11	Burnett & Washburn		Guy Benson	Rep.	Spooner
19	Calumet		Charles R. Barnard	Rep.	Brillion
28	Chippewa		Arthur L. Padrutt	Prog.	Chippewa Falls
24	Clark		Walter E. Cook	Rep.	Unity
27	Columbia		Arthur E. Austin	Rep.	Rio
16	Crawford		Donald C. McDowell	Rep.	Soldiers Grove
26	Dane	1	Lyall T. Beggs	Prog.	Madison
26	Dane	2	Earl Mullen	Prog.	Blooming Grove
26	Dane	3	Albert J. Baker	Prog.	Mount Horeb
13	Dodge	1	Elmer L. Genzmer	Dem.	Mayville
13	Dodge	2	Jesse A. Canniff	Rep.	Beaver Dam
01	Door		Alex Meunier	Rep.	Sturgeon Bay
11	Douglas	1	William R. Foley	Prog.	Superior
11	Douglas	2	Arthur Lenroot Jr.	Rep.	Superior
29	Dunn		Earl W. Hanson	Rep.	Elk Mound
28	Eau Claire		John T. Pritchard	Rep.	Eau Claire
30	Florence, Forest, & Oneida		Walter S. Fisher	Rep.	Minocqua
18	Fond du Lac	1	William J. Nuss	Rep.	Fond du Lac
18	Fond du Lac	2	Alfred Van De Zande	Rep.	Campbellsport
16	Grant	1	William H. Goldthorpe	Rep.	Cuba City
16	Grant	2	P. Bradley McIntyre	Rep.	Lancaster
17	Green		Harry A. Keegan	Rep.	Monroe
18	Green Lake & Waushara		Robert H. Boyson	Rep.	Wautoma
17	Iowa		Robert McCutchin	Prog.	Arena
12	Iron & Vilas		Margaret P. Varda	Prog.	Eagle River
32	Jackson		Casper D. Waller	Prog.	Black River Falls
33	Jefferson		Palmer F. Daugs	Dem.	Lake Mills
31	Juneau		Pat W. Brunner	Rep.	Lyndon Station
22	Kenosha	1	Frederick Pfennig	Rep.	Kenosha
22	Kenosha	2	Matt G. Siebert	Dem.	Salem
01	Kewaunee		Joseph M. Mleziva	Rep.	Luxemburg
32	La Crosse	1	Edward C. Krause	Rep.	La Crosse
32	La Crosse	2	William F. Miller	Rep.	West Salem
17	Lafayette		Henry Youngblood	Rep.	Wiota
30	Langlade		Clair Finch	Rep.	Antigo
25	Lincoln		James H. Hamlin	Rep.	Merrill
01	Manitowoc	1	Otto A. Vogel	Prog.	Manitowoc
01	Manitowoc	2	Frank E. Riley	Rep.	Two Rivers
25	Marathon	1	Martin C. Lueck	Rep.	Hamburg
25	Marathon	2	Paul A. Luedtke	Rep.	Wausau
30	Marinette		Orin W. Angwall	Rep.	Marinette
09	Milwaukee	1	Charles P. Greene	Dem.	Milwaukee
06	Milwaukee	2	Michael F. O'Connell	Dem.	Milwaukee
08	Milwaukee	3	William Luebke	Prog.	Milwaukee
09	Milwaukee	4	John A. Zoller	Rep.	Milwaukee
03	Milwaukee	5	Mary O. Kryszak	Dem.	Milwaukee
09	Milwaukee	6	Phillip Markey	Prog.	Milwaukee
06	Milwaukee	7	Martin E. Schreiber	Rep.	Milwaukee
08	Milwaukee	8	Richard M. Rice	Rep.	Milwaukee
05	Milwaukee	9	Edward L. Graf	Rep.	Milwaukee
07	Milwaukee	10	Leland McParland	Dem.	Cudahy
03	Milwaukee	11	Ervin J. Ryczek	Dem.	Milwaukee
07	Milwaukee	12	Peter Pyszczynski	Dem.	Milwaukee
04	Milwaukee	13	William Nawrocki	Dem.	Milwaukee
04	Milwaukee	14	John C. McBride	Rep.	Milwaukee
05	Milwaukee	15	Charles E. Collar	Rep.	Milwaukee
06	Milwaukee	16	Herman B. Wegner	Prog.	Milwaukee
07	Milwaukee	17	William F. Double	Rep.	Milwaukee
06	Milwaukee	18	Alvin J. Clasen	Rep.	Milwaukee
05	Milwaukee	19	Charles F. Westfahl	Rep.	Milwaukee
08	Milwaukee	20	Milton F. Burmaster	Rep.	Wauwatosa
31	Monroe		Alex L. Nicol	Rep.	Sparta
02	Oconto		John E. Youngs	Rep.	Oconto
14	Outagamie	1	Mark Catlin Jr.	Rep.	Appleton
14	Outagamie	2	William M. Rohan	Dem.	Kaukauna
20	Ozaukee		Fred L. Feierstein	Rep.	Random Lake
10	Pierce		Selmer W. Gunderson	Rep.	Spring Valley
29	Polk		Raymond A. Peabody	Rep.	Milltown
23	Portage		John Kostuck	Dem.	Stevens Point
12	Price		Ernest A. Heden	Rep.	Ogema
21	Racine	1	Carl C. Christensen	Rep.	Racine
21	Racine	2	Willis Frazell	Rep.	Racine
21	Racine	3	Randolph H. Runden	Rep.	Union Grove
27	Richland		Vernon W. Thomson	Rep.	Richland Center
15	Rock	1	Edward Grassman	Rep.	Edgerton
15	Rock	2	Burger M. Engebretson	Rep.	Beloit
12	Rusk & Sawyer		Nicholas Christman	Rep.	Tony
27	Sauk		George J. Woerth	Rep.	Prairie du Sac
14	Shawano		Charles Ebert	Rep.	Gresham
20	Sheboygan	1	Ernest Keppler	Rep.	Sheboygan
20	Sheboygan	2	Edwin J. Larson	Rep.	Plymouth
10	St. Croix		Elmer L. Rundell	Rep.	Roberts
24	Taylor		Carl M. Nelson	Rep.	Medford
32	Trempealeau		Martin D. Brom	Rep.	Arcadia
16	Vernon		Jerome H. Wheelock	Rep.	Viroqua
22	Walworth		Ora R. Rice	Rep.	Delavan
13	Washington		Joseph A. Schmitz	Rep.	Germantown
33	Waukesha	1	Frederic Woodhead	Rep.	Waukesha
33	Waukesha	2	Alfred R. Ludvigsen	Rep.	Hartland
23	Waupaca		Julius Spearbraker	Rep.	Clintonville
19	Winnebago	1	Walter Tank	Rep.	Oshkosh
19	Winnebago	2	James C. Fritzen	Rep.	Neenah
24	Wood		William W. Clark	Rep.	Vesper

== Committees ==
=== Senate committees ===
- Senate Standing Committee on Agriculture and Labor – M. R. Laird, chair
- Senate Standing Committee on Committees – M. T. Murray, chair
- Senate Standing Committee on Contingent Expenditures – T. G. Brown, chair
- Senate Standing Committee on Corporations and Taxation – M. T. Murray, chair
- Senate Standing Committee on Education and Public Welfare – W. A. Freehoff, chair
- Senate Standing Committee on Highways – J. Miller, chair
- Senate Standing Committee on the Judiciary – J. W. Byrnes, chair
- Senate Standing Committee on Legislative Procedure – C. Shearer, chair
- Senate Standing Committee on Military Affairs – B. Gettelman, chair
- Senate Standing Committee on State and Local Government – R. Schlabach, chair

=== Assembly committees ===
- Assembly Standing Committee on Agriculture – O. R. Rice, chair
- Assembly Standing Committee on Commerce and Manufactures – E. Grassman, chair
- Assembly Standing Committee on Conservation – E. A. Heden, chair
- Assembly Standing Committee on Contingent Expenditures – G. Benson, chair
- Assembly Standing Committee on Education – W. H. Goldthorpe, chair
- Assembly Standing Committee on Elections – W. J. Nuss, chair
- Assembly Standing Committee on Engrossed Bills – H. Youngblood, chair
- Assembly Standing Committee on Enrolled Bills – C. M. Nelson, chair
- Assembly Standing Committee on Excise and Fees – J. A. Schmitz, chair
- Assembly Standing Committee on Highways – D. C. McDowell, chair
- Assembly Standing Committee on Insurance and Banking – J. C. McBride, chair
- Assembly Standing Committee on the Judiciary – M. Catlin, chair
- Assembly Standing Committee on Labor – W. E. Cook, chair
- Assembly Standing Committee on Municipalities – W. F. Double, chair
- Assembly Standing Committee on Printing – J. C. Chapple, chair
- Assembly Standing Committee on Public Welfare – E. W. Hanson, chair
- Assembly Standing Committee on Revision – C. E. Collar, chair
- Assembly Standing Committee on Rules – D. C. McDowell, chair
- Assembly Standing Committee on State Affairs – A. E. Austin, chair
- Assembly Standing Committee on Taxation – A. R. Ludvigsen, chair
- Assembly Standing Committee on Third Reading – W. F. Miller, chair
- Assembly Standing Committee on Transportation – D. I. Hammergren, chair

=== Joint committees ===
- Joint Standing Committee on Finance – H. Lewis (Sen.) & P. B. McIntyre (Asm.), co-chairs
- Joint Standing Committee on Revisions, Repeals, and Uniform Laws – G. W. Buchen (Sen.) & W. J. Nuss (Asm.), co-chairs

== Employees ==
=== Senate employees ===
- Chief Clerk: Lawrence R. Larsen
  - Assistant Chief Clerk: Thomas M. Donahue
- Sergeant-at-Arms: Emil A. Hartman (died Oct 30, 1943)
  - Assistant Sergeant-at-Arms: Harold Damon

=== Assembly employees ===
- Chief Clerk: Arthur L. May
  - Assistant Chief Clerk: Edward J. Walden
- Sergeant-at-Arms: Norris J. Kellman
  - Assistant Sergeant-at-Arms: Phillip K. Lalor
