= 67th Wisconsin Legislature =

Wisconsin legislative term for 1945–1946

←	66th	68th	→
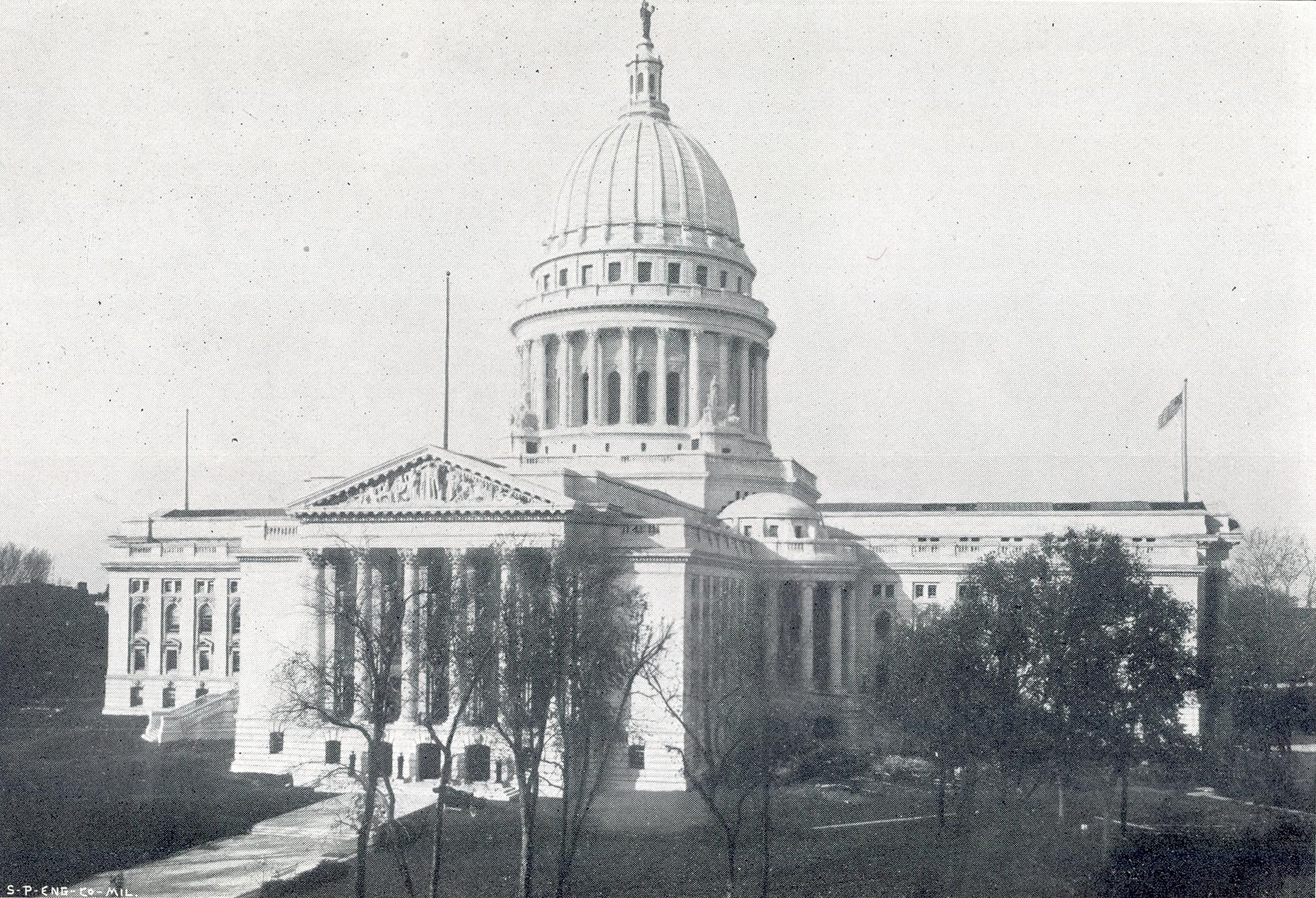
- Wisconsin State Capitol ca.1915

Overview
- Legislative body: Wisconsin Legislature
- Meeting place: Wisconsin State Capitol
- Term: January 1, 1945 – January 6, 1947
- Election: November 7, 1944

Senate
- Members: 33
- Senate President: Oscar Rennebohm (R)
- President pro tempore: Conrad Shearer (R)
- Party control: Republican

Assembly
- Members: 100
- Assembly Speaker: Donald C. McDowell (R)
- Party control: Republican

Sessions
- Regular: January 10, 1945 – September 6, 1945

Special sessions
- Jul. 1946 Spec.: July 29, 1946 – July 30, 1946

The Sixty-Seventh Wisconsin Legislature convened from January 10, 1945, to September 6, 1945, in regular session, and reconvened in a special session in July 1946.

This legislative term saw the end of World War II and the establishment of the United Nations. The term also saw the end of the Wisconsin Progressive Party, which formally disbanded at a 1946 convention.

Senators representing even-numbered districts were newly elected for this session and were serving the first two years of a four-year term. Assembly members were elected to a two-year term. Assembly members and even-numbered senators were elected in the general election of November 7, 1944. Senators representing odd-numbered districts were serving the third and fourth year of a four-year term, having been elected in the general election of November 3, 1942.

The governor of Wisconsin during this entire term was Republican Walter Samuel Goodland, of Racine County, serving his second two-year term, having won election in the 1944 Wisconsin gubernatorial election.

== Major events ==
- January 1, 1945: Second inauguration of Walter Samuel Goodland as Governor of Wisconsin.
- January 20, 1945: Fourth inauguration of Franklin D. Roosevelt as President of the United States.
- February 11, 1945: The Yalta Conference concluded, agreeing to the denazification and postwar partition of Germany, as well as self-determination rights for a liberated Poland.
- April 3, 1945: Wisconsin voters ratified two amendments to the state constitution:
  - Aboliting the office of justice of the peace in first class cities.
  - Allowing the state to take on debt for aeronautical improvements.
- April 12, 1945: U.S. President Franklin D. Roosevelt died in office. Vice President Harry S. Truman immediately succeeded him as the 33rd President of the United States.
- April 28, 1945: Benito Mussolini was executed by partisans in Milan, Italy.
- April 29, 1945: Axis forces in Italy signed an unconditional surrender to the Allies.
- April 30, 1945: Adolf Hitler committed suicide in his bunker in Berlin, Germany.
- May 2, 1945: Soviet forces captured Berlin.
- May 8, 1945: Representatives of the German Army signed the German Instrument of Surrender, formally ending Germany's part in World War II.
- June 26, 1945: The Charter of the United Nations was published at the end of the United Nations Conference on International Organization.
- July 16, 1945: The first atomic bomb test took place at the Trinity site in New Mexico.
- July 21, 1945: U.S. President Harry S. Truman signed an order approving the use of atomic bombs against Imperial Japan.
- August 6, 1945: U.S. forces detonated an atomic bomb over Hiroshima, killing at least 90,000 people and destroying much of the city.
- August 8, 1945: The United States ratified the Charter of the United Nations, becoming the third nation to ratify the document.
- August 9, 1945: U.S. forces detonated an atomic bomb over Nagasaki, killing at least 39,000 people.
- August 14, 1945: Emperor Hirohito agreed to the unconditional surrender of Japan to Allied forces, ending major combat in World War II.
- October 24, 1945: The United Nations was established as a sufficient number of nations had ratified the Charter.
- March 17, 1946: At a convention in Portage, Wisconsin, the Wisconsin Progressive Party voted to disband. The majority of delegates voted to rejoin the Republican Party of Wisconsin.
- March 19, 1946: Wisconsin Supreme Court justice Joseph Martin died in office.
- April 2, 1946: Wisconsin voters rejected an amendment to the state constitution which would have removed term limits from the sheriffs.
- April 6, 1946: Wisconsin governor Walter Samuel Goodland appointed James Ward Rector to the Wisconsin Supreme Court to succeed the deceased justice Joseph Martin.
- April 18, 1946: The League of Nations met for the last time, transferred its mission to the United Nations and disbanded.
- August 14, 1946: Wisconsin's senior United States senator Robert M. La Follette Jr., after the dissolution of the Wisconsin Progressive Party, was defeated in the Republican Party primary by Wisconsin circuit court judge Joseph McCarthy.
- November 5, 1946:
  - Walter Samuel Goodland re-elected Governor of Wisconsin.
  - Joseph McCarthy elected United States senator from Wisconsin.
  - Wisconsin voters ratified two amendments to the state constitution:
    - Removing audit powers from the Secretary of State.
    - Assigning audit powers to the Legislature.
  - Wisconsin voters also rejected an amendment to the state constitution:
    - Allowing public transportation to be used for students to attend private or parochial schools.

== Major legislation ==
- July 30, 1945: An Act ... relating to aeronautics, and making an appropriation, 1945 Act 513. Established Wisconsin's Aeronautics Commission.
- August 27, 1945: An Act ... creating a Wisconsin department of veterans' affairs, providing educational aid, economic aid, medical, hospital, or other remedial care for World War II veterans and their dependents, transferring to said department certain powers, duties, and functions vested in the soldiers' rehabilitation board and adjutant general, and custodian of memorial hall, and making an appropriation, 1945 Act 580. Created the Wisconsin Department of Veterans Affairs.
- 1945 Joint Resolution 2: Second legislative passage of a proposed amendment to the state constitution to abolish the office of justice of the peace in first class cities. This amendment was ratified by voters at the April 1945 election.
- 1945 Joint Resolution 3: Second legislative passage of a proposed amendment to the state constitution to allow the state to take on debt to fund aeronautical improvements.
- 1945 Joint Resolution 47: Second legislative passage of a proposed amendment to the state constitution to abolish term limits for Wisconsin sheriffs. This amendment was rejected by voters at the April 1946 election.
- 1945 Joint Resolution 73: Second legislative passage of a proposed amendment to the state constitution to remove audit powers from the Secretary of State and transfer those powers to the Legislature. This amendment was ratified by voters in two separate questions at the November 1946 election.
- 1945 Joint Resolution 78: Second legislative passage of a proposed amendment to the state constitution to allow public transportation to be used for students to attend private and parochial schools in addition to existing transportation for public schools. This amendment was rejected by voters at the November 1946 election.

== Party summary ==
=== Senate summary ===
Senate partisan composition Democratic: 6 seats Progressive: 5 seats Republican: 22 seats

	Party (Shading indicates majority caucus)			Total	
	Dem.	Prog.	Rep.	Total	Vacant
End of previous Legislature	4	6	22	32	1
Start of Reg. Session	6	5	22	33	0
From Mar. 19, 1946 (Note: Republican Melvin R. Laird Sr. (24th District) died.)	6	5	21	32	1
Final voting share	18.75%	15.63%	65.63%		
Beginning of the next Legislature	5	1	27	33	0

=== Assembly summary ===
Assembly partisan composition Democratic: 20 seats Progressive: 6 seats Republican: 74 seats

	Party (Shading indicates majority caucus)			Total	
	Dem.	Prog.	Rep.	Total	Vacant
End of previous Legislature	14	13	73	100	0
Start of Reg. Session	20	6	74	100	0
From Jul. 16, 1945 (Note: Democrat Mary O. Kryszak (Milwaukee County) died.)	19	6	74	99	1
From Oct. 11, 1945 (Note: Republican James C. Fritzen (Winnebago County) died.)	19	6	73	98	2
From Oct. 29, 1945 (Note: Republican Fred L. Feierstein (Ozaukee County) died.)	19	6	72	97	3
From Mar. 25, 1946 (Note: Republican Edward M. Schneider (Winnebago County) died.)	19	6	71	96	4
From May 1, 1946 (Note: Republican John C. Chapple (Ashland County) died.)	19	6	70	95	5
Final voting share	20%	6.32%	73.68%		
Beginning of the next Legislature	12	0	88	100	0

== Sessions ==
- Regular session: January 10, 1945 – September 6, 1945
- July 1946 special session: July 29, 1946 – July 30, 1946

== Leaders ==
=== Senate leadership ===
- President of the Senate: Oscar Rennebohm (R)
- President pro tempore: Conrad Shearer (R–Kenosha)
- Majority leader: Warren P. Knowles (R–New Richmond)
- Minority leader: Anthony P. Gawronski (D–Milwaukee)

=== Assembly leadership ===
- Speaker of the Assembly: Donald C. McDowell (R–Soldiers Grove)
- Majority leader: Vernon W. Thomson (R–Richland Center)
- Minority leaders:
  - Leland McParland (D–Milwaukee)
  - Lyall T. Beggs (P–Madison)

== Members ==
=== Members of the Senate ===
Members of the Senate for the Sixty-Seventh Wisconsin Legislature:

Senate partisan representation Democratic: 6 seats Progressive: 5 seats Republican: 22 seats

Dist.	Counties	Senator	Residence	Party
01	Door, Kewaunee, & Manitowoc	John E. Cashman	Denmark	Prog.
02	Brown & Oconto	Harold A. Lytie	Green Bay	Dem.
03	Milwaukee (South City)	Clement J. Zablocki	Milwaukee	Dem.
04	Milwaukee (Northeast County & Northeast City)	John C. McBride	Milwaukee	Rep.
05	Milwaukee (Northwest City)	Bernhard Gettelman	Milwaukee	Rep.
06	Milwaukee (North-Central City)	Edward Reuther	Milwaukee	Dem.
07	Milwaukee (Southeast County & Southeast City)	Anthony P. Gawronski	Milwaukee	Dem.
08	Milwaukee (Western County)	Allen Busby	West Milwaukee	Rep.
09	Milwaukee (City Downtown)	Robert E. Tehan	Milwaukee	Dem.
10	Buffalo, Pepin, Pierce, & St. Croix	Warren P. Knowles	New Richmond	Rep.
11	Bayfield, Burnett, Douglas, & Washburn	Elmer Peterson	Superior	Prog.
12	Ashland, Iron, Price, Rusk, Sawyer, & Vilas	Ernest A. Heden	Glidden	Rep.
13	Dodge & Washington	Frank E. Panzer	Oakfield	Rep.
14	Outagamie & Shawano	Gordon A. Bubolz	Appleton	Rep.
15	Rock	Robert P. Robinson	Beloit	Rep.
16	Crawford, Grant, & Vernon	Foster B. Porter	Bloomington	Rep.
17	Green, Iowa, & Lafayette	Melvin Olson	South Wayne	Rep.
18	Fond du Lac, Green Lake & Waushara	Louis J. Fellenz Jr.	Fond du Lac	Rep.
19	Calumet & Winnebago	Taylor G. Brown	Oshkosh	Rep.
20	Ozaukee & Sheboygan	Gustave W. Buchen	Sheboygan	Rep.
21	Racine	Edward F. Hilker	Racine	Rep.
22	Kenosha & Walworth	Conrad Shearer	Kenosha	Rep.
23	Portage & Waupaca	Harley M. Jacklin	Plover	Dem.
24	Clark, Taylor, & Wood	Melvin R. Laird Sr. (died Mar. 19, 1946)	Marshfield	Rep.
25	Lincoln & Marathon	William McNeight	Unity	Rep.
26	Dane	Fred Risser	Madison	Prog.
27	Columbia, Richland, & Sauk	Jess Miller	Richland Center	Rep.
28	Chippewa & Eau Claire	George H. Hipke	Stanley	Rep.
29	Barron, Dunn, & Polk	Charles D. Madsen	Luck	Prog.
30	Florence, Forest, Langlade, Marinette, & Oneida	Philip Downing	Amberg	Rep.
31	Adams, Juneau, Monroe, & Marquette	J. Earl Leverich	Sparta	Prog.
32	Jackson, La Crosse, & Trempealeau	Rudolph Schlabach	La Crosse	Rep.
33	Jefferson & Waukesha	William A. Freehoff	Waukesha	Rep.

=== Members of the Assembly ===
Members of the Assembly for the Sixty-Seventh Wisconsin Legislature:

Assembly partisan composition Democratic: 20 seats Progressive: 6 seats Republican: 74 seats

Milwaukee County districts

Senate Dist.	County	Dist.	Representative	Party	Residence
31	Adams & Marquette		Robert M. Long	Rep.	Westfield
12	Ashland		John C. Chapple (died May 1, 1946)	Rep.	Ashland
29	Barron		Charles H. Sykes	Rep.	Cameron
11	Bayfield		Samuel E. Squires	Rep.	Mason
02	Brown	1	Robert E. Lynch	Dem.	Green Bay
02	Brown	2	William J. Sweeney	Dem.	De Pere
10	Buffalo & Pepin		Grover L. Broadfoot	Rep.	Mondovi
11	Burnett & Washburn		Guy Benson	Rep.	Spooner
19	Calumet		Charles R. Barnard	Rep.	Brillion
28	Chippewa		Arthur L. Padrutt	Prog.	Chippewa Falls
24	Clark		Walter E. Cook	Rep.	Unity
27	Columbia		Arthur E. Austin	Rep.	Rio
16	Crawford		Donald C. McDowell	Rep.	Soldiers Grove
26	Dane	1	Lyall T. Beggs	Prog.	Madison
26	Dane	2	Earl Mullen	Prog.	Blooming Grove
26	Dane	3	Rudy W. Roethlisberger	Rep.	Verona
13	Dodge	1	Elmer L. Genzmer	Dem.	Mayville
13	Dodge	2	Jesse A. Canniff	Rep.	Beaver Dam
01	Door		Alex Meunier	Rep.	Sturgeon Bay
11	Douglas	1	Frank D. Sheahan	Prog.	Superior
11	Douglas	2	Arthur Lenroot Jr.	Rep.	Superior
29	Dunn		Earl W. Hanson	Rep.	Elk Mound
28	Eau Claire		John T. Pritchard	Rep.	Eau Claire
30	Florence, Forest, & Oneida		Walter S. Fisher	Rep.	Minocqua
18	Fond du Lac	1	William J. Nuss	Rep.	Fond du Lac
18	Fond du Lac	2	Alfred Van De Zande	Rep.	Campbellsport
16	Grant	1	William H. Goldthorpe	Rep.	Cuba City
16	Grant	2	Hugh A. Harper	Rep.	Lancaster
17	Green		Harry A. Keegan	Rep.	Monroe
18	Green Lake & Waushara		Halbert W. Brooks	Rep.	Green Lake
17	Iowa		Glenn H. James	Rep.	Montfort
12	Iron & Vilas		Alex J. Raineri	Rep.	Hurley
32	Jackson		Casper D. Waller	Prog.	Black River Falls
33	Jefferson		Palmer F. Daugs	Dem.	Lake Mills
31	Juneau		Pat W. Brunner	Rep.	Lyndon Station
22	Kenosha	1	Frederick Pfennig	Rep.	Kenosha
22	Kenosha	2	Matt G. Siebert	Dem.	Salem
01	Kewaunee		Joseph M. Mleziva	Rep.	Luxemburg
32	La Crosse	1	Edward C. Krause	Rep.	La Crosse
32	La Crosse	2	Ernest F. Storandt	Rep.	West Salem
17	Lafayette		Henry Youngblood	Rep.	Wiota
30	Langlade		Clair Finch	Rep.	Antigo
25	Lincoln		James H. Hamlin	Rep.	Merrill
01	Manitowoc	1	Otto A. Vogel	Prog.	Manitowoc
01	Manitowoc	2	Frank E. Riley	Rep.	Two Rivers
25	Marathon	1	Martin C. Lueck	Rep.	Hamburg
25	Marathon	2	Paul A. Luedtke	Rep.	Wausau
30	Marinette		Orin W. Angwall	Rep.	Marinette
09	Milwaukee	1	Charles P. Greene	Dem.	Milwaukee
06	Milwaukee	2	Michael F. O'Connell	Dem.	Milwaukee
08	Milwaukee	3	Alfred Swendson	Dem.	Greendale
09	Milwaukee	4	Frank E. Schaeffer Jr.	Dem.	Milwaukee
03	Milwaukee	5	Mary O. Kryszak (died Jul. 16, 1945)	Dem.	Milwaukee
09	Milwaukee	6	Le Roy Simmons	Dem.	Milwaukee
06	Milwaukee	7	Clyde Follansbee	Rep.	Milwaukee
08	Milwaukee	8	Douglas C. Steltz	Dem.	Milwaukee
05	Milwaukee	9	Edward L. Graf	Rep.	Milwaukee
07	Milwaukee	10	Leland McParland	Dem.	Cudahy
03	Milwaukee	11	Ervin J. Ryczek	Dem.	Milwaukee
07	Milwaukee	12	Peter Pyszczynski	Dem.	Milwaukee
04	Milwaukee	13	William Nawrocki	Dem.	Milwaukee
04	Milwaukee	14	John R. Devitt	Rep.	Milwaukee
05	Milwaukee	15	Charles E. Collar	Rep.	Milwaukee
06	Milwaukee	16	Ernest L. Riebau	Rep.	Milwaukee
07	Milwaukee	17	Roman R. Blenski	Dem.	Milwaukee
06	Milwaukee	18	Charles M. Fisher	Dem.	Milwaukee
05	Milwaukee	19	Charles F. Westfahl	Rep.	Milwaukee
08	Milwaukee	20	Milton F. Burmaster	Rep.	Wauwatosa
31	Monroe		Alex L. Nicol	Rep.	Sparta
02	Oconto		John E. Youngs	Rep.	Oconto
14	Outagamie	1	Fred H. Frank	Rep.	Appleton
14	Outagamie	2	Gustave Hanges	Rep.	Kimberly
20	Ozaukee		Fred L. Feierstein (died Oct. 29, 1945)	Rep.	Random Lake
10	Pierce		Selmer W. Gunderson	Rep.	Spring Valley
29	Polk		Raymond A. Peabody	Rep.	Milltown
23	Portage		John Kostuck	Dem.	Stevens Point
12	Price		Mike Cummings	Rep.	Fifield
21	Racine	1	Carl C. Christensen	Rep.	Racine
21	Racine	2	Willis Frazell	Rep.	Racine
21	Racine	3	Randolph H. Runden	Rep.	Union Grove
27	Richland		Vernon W. Thomson	Rep.	Richland Center
15	Rock	1	Edward Grassman	Rep.	Edgerton
15	Rock	2	Burger M. Engebretson	Rep.	Beloit
12	Rusk & Sawyer		Nicholas Christman	Rep.	Tony
27	Sauk		George J. Woerth	Rep.	Prairie du Sac
14	Shawano		Charles Ebert	Rep.	Gresham
20	Sheboygan	1	John Schneider Jr.	Dem.	Sheboygan
20	Sheboygan	2	Henry W. Timmer	Rep.	Waldo
10	St. Croix		Elmer L. Rundell	Rep.	Roberts
24	Taylor		Carl M. Nelson	Rep.	Medford
32	Trempealeau		Chauncey E. Heath	Rep.	Osseo
16	Vernon		Jerome H. Wheelock	Rep.	Viroqua
22	Walworth		Ora R. Rice	Rep.	Delavan
13	Washington		Theodore Holtebeck	Rep.	West Bend
33	Waukesha	1	Frederic Woodhead	Rep.	Waukesha
33	Waukesha	2	Alfred R. Ludvigsen	Rep.	Hartland
23	Waupaca		Julius Spearbraker	Rep.	Clintonville
19	Winnebago	1	Edward M. Schneider (died Mar. 25, 1946)	Rep.	Oshkosh
19	Winnebago	2	James C. Fritzen (died Oct. 11, 1945)	Rep.	Neenah
24	Wood		William W. Clark	Rep.	Vesper

== Committees ==
=== Senate committees ===
- Senate Standing Committee on Agriculture and Labor – M. R. Laird, chair
- Senate Standing Committee on Committees – W. P. Knowles, chair
- Senate Standing Committee on Conservation – T. G. Brown, chair
- Senate Standing Committee on Contingent Expenditures – E. F. Hilker, chair
- Senate Standing Committee on Corporations and Taxation – L. J. Fellenz, chair
- Senate Standing Committee on Education and Public Welfare – W. A. Freehoff, chair
- Senate Standing Committee on Highways – J. Miller, chair
- Senate Standing Committee on the Judiciary – G. W. Buchen, chair
- Senate Standing Committee on Legislative Procedure – C. Shearer, chair
- Senate Standing Committee on State and Local Government – B. Gettelman, chair
- Senate Standing Committee on Veterans and Military Affairs – R. Schlabach, chair

=== Assembly committees ===
- Assembly Standing Committee on Agriculture – O. R. Rice, chair
- Assembly Standing Committee on Commerce and Manufactures – E. Grassman, chair
- Assembly Standing Committee on Conservation – J. E. Youngs, chair
- Assembly Standing Committee on Contingent Expenditures – A. A. Lenroot, chair
- Assembly Standing Committee on Education – W. W. Clark, chair
- Assembly Standing Committee on Elections – C. E. Collar, chair
- Assembly Standing Committee on Engrossed Bills – H. Youngblood, chair
- Assembly Standing Committee on Enrolled Bills – F. E. Riley, chair
- Assembly Standing Committee on Excise and Fees – F. Pfennig, chair
- Assembly Standing Committee on Highways – H. A. Keegan, chair
- Assembly Standing Committee on Insurance and Banking – B. M. Engebretson, chair
- Assembly Standing Committee on the Judiciary – V. W. Thomson, chair
- Assembly Standing Committee on Labor – G. Benson, chair
- Assembly Standing Committee on Municipalities – E. C. Krause, chair
- Assembly Standing Committee on Printing – J. C. Chapple, chair
- Assembly Standing Committee on Public Welfare – E. W. Hanson, chair
- Assembly Standing Committee on Rules – W. J. Nuss, chair
- Assembly Standing Committee on State Affairs – A. E. Austin, chair
- Assembly Standing Committee on Taxation – J. A. Canniff, chair
- Assembly Standing Committee on Third Reading – F. L. Feierstein, chair
- Assembly Standing Committee on Transportation – A. Van De Zande, chair
- Assembly Standing Committee on Veterans and Military Affairs – C. C. Christensen, chair

=== Joint committees ===
- Joint Standing Committee on Finance – G. H. Hipke (Sen.) & J. Spearbraker (Asm.), co-chairs
- Joint Standing Committee on Revisions, Repeals, and Uniform Laws – G. W. Buchen (Sen.) & C. F. Westfahl (Asm.), co-chairs

== Employees ==
=== Senate employees ===
- Chief Clerk: Lawrence R. Larsen
- Sergeant-at-Arms: Harold Damon
  - Assistant Sergeant-at-Arms: Kenneth Hoard

=== Assembly employees ===
- Chief Clerk: Arthur L. May
  - Assistant Chief Clerk: Joseph S. Einberger
- Sergeant-at-Arms: Norris J. Kellman
  - Assistant Sergeant-at-Arms: J. Irvin Thomas
