= 65th Wisconsin Legislature =

Wisconsin legislative term for 1941–1942

←	64th	66th	→
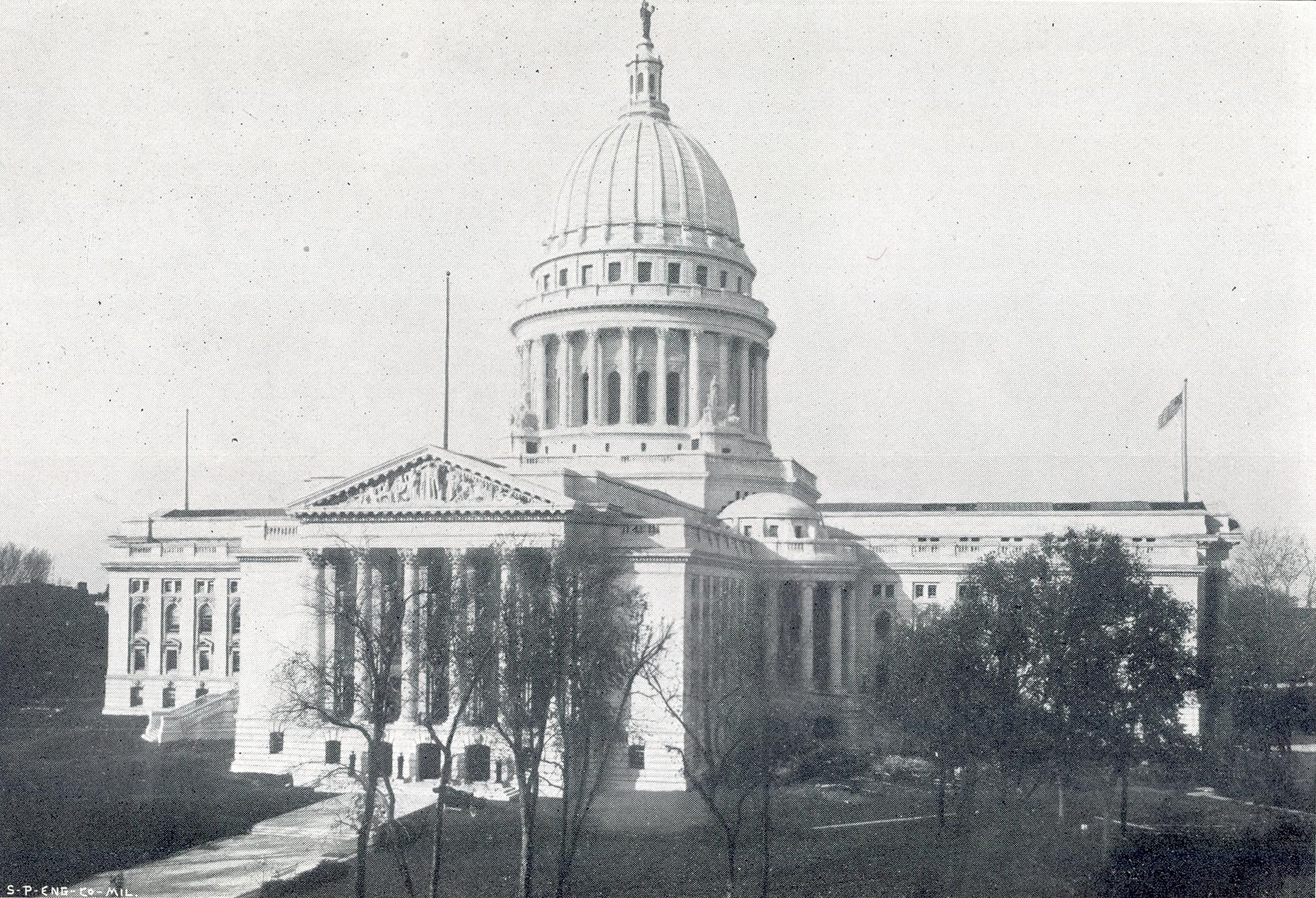
- Wisconsin State Capitol ca.1915

Overview
- Legislative body: Wisconsin Legislature
- Meeting place: Wisconsin State Capitol
- Term: January 6, 1941 – January 4, 1943
- Election: November 5, 1940

Senate
- Members: 33
- Senate President: Walter S. Goodland (R)
- President pro tempore: Conrad Shearer (R)
- Party control: Republican

Assembly
- Members: 100
- Assembly Speaker: Vernon W. Thomson (R)
- Party control: Republican

Sessions
- Regular: January 8, 1941 – June 6, 1941

The Sixty-Fifth Wisconsin Legislature convened from January 8, 1941, to June 6, 1941, in regular session.

This legislative term coincided with the United States entrance into World War II. This session also represents the first time the Legislature failed to pass a redistricting act on schedule. Ultimately, no redistricting would occur in Wisconsin in the 1940s.

Senators representing even-numbered districts were newly elected for this session and were serving the first two years of a four-year term. Assembly members were elected to a two-year term. Assembly members and even-numbered senators were elected in the general election of November 5, 1940. Senators representing odd-numbered districts were serving the third and fourth year of a four-year term, having been elected in the general election of November 8, 1938.

The governor of Wisconsin during this entire term was Republican Julius P. Heil, of Milwaukee County, serving his second two-year term, having won re-election in the 1940 Wisconsin gubernatorial election.

== Major events ==
- January 6, 1941:
  - Second inauguration of Julius P. Heil as Governor of Wisconsin.
  - At his State of the Union address, U.S. President Franklin D. Roosevelt presented his Four Freedoms as fundamental human rights.
- January 20, 1941: Third inauguration of Franklin D. Roosevelt as President of the United States.
- January 21, 1941: The keel of the USS Wisconsin (BB-64) was laid down at Philadelphia Naval Shipyard.
- March 11, 1941: The Lend-Lease Act was signed into law by U.S. President Franklin D. Roosevelt.
- April 1, 1941: Wisconsin voters ratified an amendment to the state constitution allowing real estate taxes to be paid in installments.
- May 27, 1941:
  - U.S. President Franklin Roosevelt proclaimed an unlimited national emergency.
  - The Germany Navy battleship Bismarck was scuttled and sunk after being damaged in battle with British Navy off the coast of France.
- June 14, 1941: All German and Italian assets in the United States were frozen.
- June 22, 1941: Nazi Germany launched Operation Barbarossa, invading the Soviet Union and breaking their non-aggression pact.
- July 1, 1941: Commercial television was authorized in the United States by the Federal Communications Commission.
- July 8, 1941: Wisconsin U.S. representative Stephen Bolles (WI-01) died in office.
- August 14, 1941: The United States and United Kingdom issued the Atlantic Charter, describing their goals for a postwar world.
- October 30, 1941: U.S. President Franklin Roosevelt approved a $1 billion lend–lease aide package for the Soviet Union (over $20 billion adjusted for inflation to 2023).
- December 7, 1941: Naval forces of the Empire of Japan launched a surprise attack on the United States Navy at Pearl Harbor.
- December 8, 1941: The United States declared war on Japan.
- January 7, 1942: The German Army abandoned their attempt to take Moscow after a three-month battle.
- January 20, 1942: At the Wannsee Conference in Berlin, officers of the Nazi German government decided that the Final Solution to the "Jewish Problem" would be deportations to extermination camps.
- March 9, 1942: The first prisoners of war arrived at Wisconsin's Fort McCoy.
- March 18, 1942: U.S. President Franklin Roosevelt signed Executive Order 9102, creating the War Relocation Authority.
- April 26, 1942: The German Reichstag met for the last time, dissolving and declaring Adolf Hitler supreme judge of the German people.
- May 8, 1942: Imperial Japanese forces completed the conquest of the Philippines, taking roughly 100,000 American and Filipino prisoners of war.
- June 4, 1942: United States Navy aviators sank all four of Japan's fleet carriers present at the Battle of Midway.
- November 3, 1942: Orland Steen Loomis (P) elected Governor of Wisconsin.
- November 8, 1942: About 100,000 men of the United States and allied nations under the command of Dwight D. Eisenhower landed at various points along the coast of North Africa.
- November 9, 1942: German Army forces controlled roughly 90% of the city of Stalingrad, representing the closest the Germans would come to capturing the city.
- December 2, 1942: At a lab below Stagg Field at the University of Chicago, a team led by Enrico Fermi created the first self-sustaining nuclear chain reaction as part of the Manhattan Project.
- December 7, 1942: Wisconsin governor-elect Orland Steen Loomis died of a heart attack.
- December 11, 1942: Wisconsin Supreme Court justice George B. Nelson resigned.
- December 12, 1942: Wisconsin governor Julius P. Heil appointed Elmer E. Barlow to the Wisconsin Supreme Court to succeed the retired justice George B. Nelson.
- December 29, 1942: In a unanimous decision, the Wisconsin Supreme Court ruled that the lieutenant governor-elect, Walter S. Goodland, would be sworn in as the next governor in place of the deceased governor-elect.

== Major legislation ==
- 1941 Joint Resolution 18: Second legislative passage of a proposed amendment to the state constitution to allow payment of real estate taxes in installments. This amendment was ratified by voters at the April 1941 election.

== Party summary ==
=== Senate summary ===
Senate partisan composition Democratic: 3 seats Progressive: 6 seats Republican: 23 seats Vacant: 1 seat

	Party (Shading indicates majority caucus)			Total	
	Dem.	Prog.	Rep.	Total	Vacant
End of previous Legislature	5	11	15	31	2
Start of Reg. Session	3	6	24	33	0
From Feb. 12, 1941 (Note: Republican Carl Lovelace (17th District) died.)	3	6	23	32	1
Final voting share	9.38%	18.75%	71.88%		
Beginning of the next Legislature	4	6	23	33	0

=== Assembly summary ===
Assembly partisan composition Democratic: 15 seats Progressive: 24 seats Republican: 61 seats

	Party (Shading indicates majority caucus)			Total	
	Dem.	Prog.	Rep.	Total	Vacant
End of previous Legislature	14	30	52	96	4
Start of Reg. Session	15	24	61	100	0
From Apr. 15, 1941 (Note: Progressive Dougald D. Kennedy (Polk County) died.)	15	23	61	99	1
From Sep. 30, 1941 (Note: Democrat Nicholas J. Bichler (Ozaukee County) resigned.)	14	23	61	98	2
From Feb. 24, 1942 (Note: Progressive Ben Rubin (Milwaukee County) died.)	14	22	61	97	3
From Nov. 21, 1942 (Note: Republican John Egan (Manitowoc County) died.)	14	22	60	96	4
Final voting share	14.58%	22.92%	62.5%		
Beginning of the next Legislature	14	13	73	100	0

== Sessions ==
- Regular session: January 8, 1941 – June 6, 1941

== Leaders ==
=== Senate leadership ===
- President of the Senate: Walter S. Goodland (R)
- President pro tempore: Conrad Shearer (R–Kenosha)
- Majority leader: Maurice Coakley (R–Beloit)
- Minority leader: Cornelius T. Young (D–Milwaukee)

=== Assembly leadership ===
- Speaker of the Assembly: Vernon W. Thomson (R–Richland Center)
- Majority leader: Mark Catlin Jr. (R–Appleton)
- Minority leaders:
  - Andrew Biemiller (P–Milwaukee)
  - Robert Emmet Tehan (D–Milwaukee)

== Members ==
=== Members of the Senate ===
Members of the Senate for the Sixty-Fifth Wisconsin Legislature:

Senate partisan representation Democratic: 3 seats Progressive: 6 seats Republican: 23 seats Vacant: 1 seat

Dist.	Counties	Senator	Residence	Party
01	Door, Kewaunee, & Manitowoc	John E. Cashman	Denmark	Prog.
02	Brown & Oconto	John W. Byrnes	Green Bay	Rep.
03	Milwaukee (South City)	Arthur L. Zimny	Milwaukee	Dem.
04	Milwaukee (Northeast County & Northeast City)	Milton T. Murray	Milwaukee	Rep.
05	Milwaukee (Northwest City)	Bernhard Gettelman	Milwaukee	Rep.
06	Milwaukee (North-Central City)	George Hampel	Milwaukee	Prog.
07	Milwaukee (Southeast County & Southeast City)	Anthony P. Gawronski	Milwaukee	Dem.
08	Milwaukee (Western County)	Allen Busby	West Milwaukee	Rep.
09	Milwaukee (City Downtown)	Cornelius T. Young	Milwaukee	Dem.
10	Buffalo, Pepin, Pierce, & St. Croix	Warren P. Knowles	New Richmond	Rep.
11	Bayfield, Burnett, Douglas, & Washburn	Philip E. Nelson	Maple	Prog.
12	Ashland, Iron, Price, Rusk, Sawyer, & Vilas	James H. Carroll	Glidden	Rep.
13	Dodge & Washington	Jesse Peters	Hartford	Rep.
14	Outagamie & Shawano	Mike Mack	Shiocton	Rep.
15	Rock	Maurice Coakley	Beloit	Rep.
16	Crawford, Grant, & Vernon	Helmar Lewis	Boscobel	Rep.
17	Green, Iowa, & Lafayette	Carl Lovelace (died Feb. 12, 1941)	Woodford	Rep.
17	Green, Iowa, & Lafayette	--Vacant from Feb. 12, 1941--		
18	Fond du Lac, Green Lake & Waushara	Louis J. Fellenz Jr.	Fond du Lac	Rep.
19	Calumet & Winnebago	Taylor G. Brown	Oshkosh	Rep.
20	Ozaukee & Sheboygan	Gustave W. Buchen	Sheboygan	Rep.
21	Racine	Kenneth L. Greenquist	Racine	Prog.
22	Kenosha & Walworth	Conrad Shearer	Kenosha	Rep.
23	Portage & Waupaca	Fred R. Fisher	Waupaca	Rep.
24	Clark, Taylor, & Wood	Melvin R. Laird Sr.	Marshfield	Rep.
25	Lincoln & Marathon	Otto Mueller	Wausau	Rep.
26	Dane	Fred Risser	Madison	Prog.
27	Columbia, Richland, & Sauk	Jess Miller	Richland Center	Rep.
28	Chippewa & Eau Claire	George H. Hipke	Stanley	Rep.
29	Barron, Dunn, & Polk	Albert J. Connors	Barron	Prog.
30	Florence, Forest, Langlade, Marinette, & Oneida	Philip Downing	Amberg	Rep.
31	Adams, Juneau, Monroe, & Marquette	Amrose B. Coller	Necedah	Rep.
32	Jackson, La Crosse, & Trempealeau	Rudolph Schlabach	La Crosse	Rep.
33	Jefferson & Waukesha	William A. Freehoff	Waukesha	Rep.

=== Members of the Assembly ===
Members of the Assembly for the Sixty-Fifth Wisconsin Legislature:

Assembly partisan composition Democratic: 15 seats Progressive: 24 seats Republican: 61 seats

Milwaukee County districts

Senate Dist.	County	Dist.	Representative	Party	Residence
31	Adams & Marquette		Robert M. Long	Rep.	Westfield
12	Ashland		Harry P. Van Guilder	Prog.	Ashland
29	Barron		Charles H. Sykes	Prog.	Cameron
11	Bayfield		Laurie E. Carlson	Prog.	Bayfield
02	Brown	1	Harold A. Lytie	Dem.	Green Bay
02	Brown	2	William J. Sweeney	Dem.	De Pere
10	Buffalo & Pepin		David I. Hammergren	Rep.	Cochrane
11	Burnett & Washburn		Guy Benson	Rep.	Spooner
19	Calumet		Charles R. Barnard	Rep.	Brillion
28	Chippewa		Arthur L. Padrutt	Prog.	Chippewa Falls
24	Clark		Walter E. Cook	Rep.	Unity
27	Columbia		Arthur E. Austin	Rep.	Rio
16	Crawford		Donald C. McDowell	Rep.	Soldiers Grove
26	Dane	1	Lyall T. Beggs	Prog.	Madison
26	Dane	2	Lars O. Lein	Prog.	Edgerton
26	Dane	3	Albert J. Baker	Prog.	Mount Horeb
13	Dodge	1	Elmer L. Genzmer	Dem.	Mayville
13	Dodge	2	William E. Jones	Rep.	Beaver Dam
01	Door		Frank N. Graass	Rep.	Sturgeon Bay
11	Douglas	1	Frank D. Sheahan	Prog.	Superior
11	Douglas	2	Elmer Peterson	Prog.	Poplar
29	Dunn		Earl W. Hanson	Rep.	Elk Mound
28	Eau Claire		John T. Pritchard	Prog.	Eau Claire
30	Florence, Forest, & Oneida		Henry J. Berquist	Prog.	Rhinelander
18	Fond du Lac	1	William J. Nuss	Rep.	Fond du Lac
18	Fond du Lac	2	Alfred Van De Zande	Rep.	Campbellsport
16	Grant	1	William H. Goldthorpe	Rep.	Cuba City
16	Grant	2	P. Bradley McIntyre	Rep.	Lancaster
17	Green		Harry A. Keegan	Rep.	Monroe
18	Green Lake & Waushara		Robert H. Boyson	Rep.	Wautoma
17	Iowa		Glenn H. James	Rep.	Montfort
12	Iron & Vilas		John P. Varda	Prog.	Hurley
32	Jackson		Oswald H. Johnson	Rep.	Black River Falls
33	Jefferson		Palmer F. Daugs	Dem.	Fort Atkinson
31	Juneau		Pat W. Brunner	Rep.	Lyndon Station
22	Kenosha	1	Frederick Pfennig	Rep.	Kenosha
22	Kenosha	2	Matt G. Siebert	Dem.	Salem
01	Kewaunee		Joseph M. Mleziva	Rep.	Luxemburg
32	La Crosse	1	Edward C. Krause	Rep.	La Crosse
32	La Crosse	2	William F. Miller	Rep.	West Salem
17	Lafayette		Henry Youngblood	Rep.	Wiota
30	Langlade		James T. Cavanaugh	Dem.	Antigo
25	Lincoln		W. H. Aubuchon	Prog.	Merrill
01	Manitowoc	1	John Egan (died Nov. 21, 1942)	Rep.	Manitowoc
01	Manitowoc	2	Frank E. Riley	Rep.	Two Rivers
25	Marathon	1	Martin C. Lueck	Rep.	Hamburg
25	Marathon	2	Orville Fehlhaber	Rep.	Wausau
30	Marinette		Roy H. Sengstock	Rep.	Marinette
09	Milwaukee	1	Robert G. Dela Hunt	Rep.	Milwaukee
06	Milwaukee	2	Andrew Biemiller	Prog.	Milwaukee
08	Milwaukee	3	William Luebke	Prog.	Milwaukee
09	Milwaukee	4	Robert E. Tehan	Dem.	Milwaukee
03	Milwaukee	5	Mary O. Kryszak	Dem.	Milwaukee
09	Milwaukee	6	Ben Rubin (died Feb. 24, 1942)	Prog.	Milwaukee
06	Milwaukee	7	Arthur Koegel	Prog.	Milwaukee
08	Milwaukee	8	John Doyne	Dem.	Milwaukee
05	Milwaukee	9	Edward L. Graf	Rep.	Milwaukee
07	Milwaukee	10	Leland McParland	Dem.	Cudahy
03	Milwaukee	11	Ervin J. Ryczek	Dem.	Milwaukee
07	Milwaukee	12	Peter Pyszczynski	Dem.	Milwaukee
04	Milwaukee	13	William Nawrocki	Dem.	Milwaukee
04	Milwaukee	14	John C. McBride	Rep.	Milwaukee
05	Milwaukee	15	Charles E. Collar	Rep.	Milwaukee
06	Milwaukee	16	Herman B. Wegner	Prog.	Milwaukee
07	Milwaukee	17	William F. Double	Rep.	Milwaukee
06	Milwaukee	18	Frank Weinheimer	Prog.	Milwaukee
05	Milwaukee	19	Charles F. Westfahl	Rep.	Milwaukee
08	Milwaukee	20	Eric E. Hagedorn	Rep.	Wauwatosa
31	Monroe		Alex L. Nicol	Prog.	Sparta
02	Oconto		John E. Youngs	Rep.	Oconto
14	Outagamie	1	Mark Catlin Jr.	Rep.	Appleton
14	Outagamie	2	Lloyd Lang	Rep.	Kimberly
20	Ozaukee		Nicholas J. Bichler (res. Sep. 30, 1941)	Dem.	Belgium
10	Pierce		Selmer W. Gunderson	Rep.	Spring Valley
29	Polk		Dougald D. Kennedy (died Apr. 15, 1941)	Prog.	Amery
23	Portage		John Kostuck	Prog.	Stevens Point
12	Price		Ernest A. Heden	Rep.	Ogema
21	Racine	1	Thomas P. Corbett	Rep.	Racine
21	Racine	2	Edward F. Hilker	Rep.	Racine
21	Racine	3	Randolph H. Runden	Rep.	Union Grove
27	Richland		Vernon W. Thomson	Rep.	Richland Center
15	Rock	1	Edward Grassman	Rep.	Edgerton
15	Rock	2	Burger M. Engebretson	Rep.	Beloit
12	Rusk & Sawyer		Robert H. Burns	Rep.	Ladysmith
27	Sauk		George J. Woerth	Prog.	Sauk City
14	Shawano		Charles Ebert	Rep.	Gresham
20	Sheboygan	1	Joseph M. Theisen	Dem.	Sheboygan
20	Sheboygan	2	Edwin J. Larson	Rep.	Plymouth
10	St. Croix		Elmer L. Rundell	Rep.	Roberts
24	Taylor		Carl M. Nelson	Rep.	Medford
32	Trempealeau		Martin D. Brom	Rep.	Arcadia
16	Vernon		Charles W. Fowell Jr.	Rep.	Viroqua
22	Walworth		Ora R. Rice	Rep.	Delavan
13	Washington		Joseph A. Schmitz	Rep.	Germantown
33	Waukesha	1	Glenn R. Davis	Rep.	Waukesha
33	Waukesha	2	Alfred R. Ludvigsen	Rep.	Pewaukee
23	Waupaca		Julius Spearbraker	Rep.	Clintonville
19	Winnebago	1	Leo T. Niemuth	Rep.	Oshkosh
19	Winnebago	2	James C. Fritzen	Rep.	Neenah
24	Wood		Chester A. Krohn	Prog.	Marshfield

== Committees ==
=== Senate committees ===
- Senate Standing Committee on Agriculture and Labor – F. R. Fisher, chair
- Senate Standing Committee on Committees – M. Coakley, chair
- Senate Standing Committee on Contingent Expenditures – T. G. Brown, chair
- Senate Standing Committee on Corporations and Taxation – M. T. Murray, chair
- Senate Standing Committee on Education and Public Welfare – W. A. Freehoff, chair
- Senate Standing Committee on Highways – M. Mack, chair
- Senate Standing Committee on the Judiciary – J. Peters, chair
- Senate Standing Committee on Legislative Procedure – C. Shearer, chair
- Senate Standing Committee on State and Local Government – R. Schlabach, chair

=== Assembly committees ===
- Assembly Standing Committee on Agriculture – O. R. Rice, chair
- Assembly Standing Committee on Commerce and Manufactures – B. M. Engebretson, chair
- Assembly Standing Committee on Conservation – F. N. Graass, chair
- Assembly Standing Committee on Contingent Expenditures – E. Grassman, chair
- Assembly Standing Committee on Education – W. H. Goldthorpe, chair
- Assembly Standing Committee on Elections – R. H. Burns, chair
- Assembly Standing Committee on Engrossed Bills – H. Youngblood, chair
- Assembly Standing Committee on Enrolled Bills – C. M. Nelson, chair
- Assembly Standing Committee on Excise and Fees – E. F. Hilker, chair
- Assembly Standing Committee on Highways – D. C. McDowell, chair
- Assembly Standing Committee on Insurance and Banking – J. C. McBride, chair
- Assembly Standing Committee on the Judiciary – M. Catlin, chair
- Assembly Standing Committee on Labor – A. R. Ludvigsen, chair
- Assembly Standing Committee on Municipalities – L. T. Niemuth, chair
- Assembly Standing Committee on Printing – C. W. Fowell, chair
- Assembly Standing Committee on Public Welfare – E. W. Hanson, chair
- Assembly Standing Committee on Revision – C. F. Westfahl, chair
- Assembly Standing Committee on Rules – M. Catlin, chair
- Assembly Standing Committee on State Affairs – A. E. Austin, chair
- Assembly Standing Committee on Taxation – E. A. Heden, chair
- Assembly Standing Committee on Third Reading – W. F. Miller, chair
- Assembly Standing Committee on Transportation – D. I. Hammergren, chair

=== Joint committees ===
- Joint Standing Committee on Finance – O. Mueller (Sen.) & P. B. McIntyre (Asm.), co-chairs

== Employees ==
=== Senate employees ===
- Chief Clerk: Lawrence R. Larsen
  - Assistant Chief Clerk: Thomas M. Donahue
- Sergeant-at-Arms: Emil A. Hartman
  - Assistant Sergeant-at-Arms: Winford H. Johnson

=== Assembly employees ===
- Chief Clerk: Arthur L. May
  - Assistant Chief Clerk: Edward J. Walden
- Sergeant-at-Arms: Norris J. Kellman
  - Assistant Sergeant-at-Arms: Phillip K. Lalor
