= Wiota =

Wiota may refer to:

== Places ==
United States

- Wiota, Iowa, a city
- Wiota, Wisconsin, a town
  - Wiota (community), Wisconsin, an unincorporated community
