= Carl Lovelace =

American politician

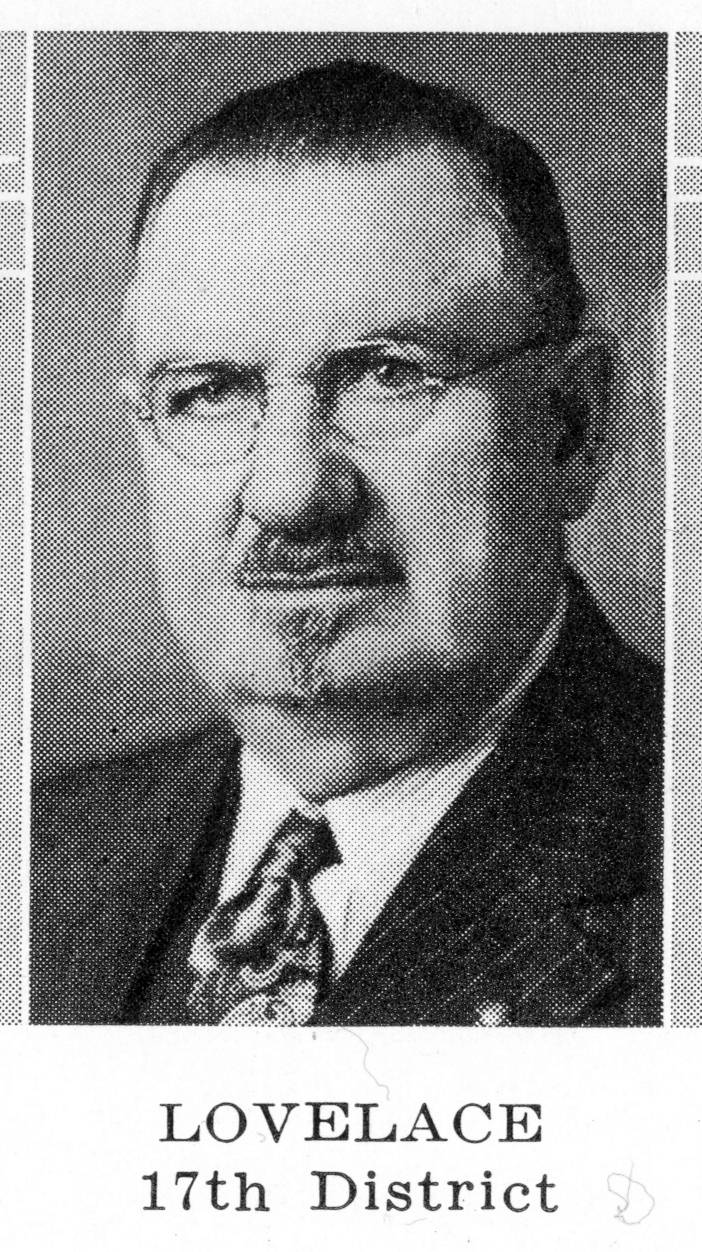
Carl Lovelace

Carl Lovelace was a member of the Wisconsin State Senate.

== Biography ==
Lovelace was born on November 29, 1878, near Wiota in Lafayette County, Wisconsin. During the Spanish–American War, he served with the United States Army. Lovelace was a Private in Troop D of the First United States Volunteer Cavalry, also known as Theodore Roosevelt's "Rough Riders". He participated in the battle at La Guasimas on June 24, 1898, Kettle and San Juan Hills on July 1, 1898, and the siege of Santiago. Lovelace lived in Woodford, Wisconsin and died on February 12, 1941. He is buried in Woodford, Wisconsin.

== Political career ==
Lovelace was a member of the Senate representing the 17th district from 1939 until his death. He was a Republican.
