= Boyson =

Boyson is a surname. Notable people with the surname include:

- Alan Boyson (1930–2018), English muralist and sculptor
- Emil Boyson (1897–1979), Norwegian poet, writer, and translator
- Rhodes Boyson (1925–2012), English educator, author and politician
- Robert H. Boyson (1893–1977), American farmer, businessman, and politician
