= Mark Catlin =

Mark Catlin may refer to:

- Mark Catlin Sr., (1882–1956) American football coach, politician and lawyer
- Mark Catlin Jr. (1910–1986), American politician and lawyer

== See also ==
- Marc Catlin, American politician
