= Frank Sheahan =

Frank Sheahan may refer to:

- Frankie Sheahan (born 1976), Irish rugby union player
- Frank D. Sheahan (1901–1974), American politician

== See also ==
- Frank Sheehan (1933–2013), Canadian politician
- Frank Sheehan (Australian politician) (1937–2021), Australian politician
