= Westfahl =

Westfahl is a surname. Notable people with the surname include:

- Charles F. Westfahl (1885-1966), American politician
- Gary Westfahl (born 1951), American writer and scholar of science fiction
