= Grover C. Winn =

American lawyer and politician

Grover Winn

9th Speaker of the Alaska Territorial House of Representatives
- In office 1931–1933
- Preceded by: R. C. Rothenburg
- Succeeded by: Joe McDonald

Member of the Alaska Territorial House of Representatives
- In office 1929–1933

Personal details
- Born: Grover Cleveland Winn; January 3, 1886; Wiota, Wisconsin, U.S.
- Died: May 18, 1943 (aged 57)
- Political party: Republican
- Education: University of Washington (LLB)

Grover Cleveland Winn (January 3, 1886 – May 18, 1943) was an American lawyer and politician who served as speaker of the Alaska Territorial House of Representatives.

== Early life and education ==
Winn was born Grover Cleveland Winn in Wiota, Wisconsin, in 1886. He received his law degree in 1910 from the University of Washington School of Law.

== Career ==
Winn practiced law in Juneau, Alaska, and served as a member of the Juneau School Board. Winn was a member of the Alaska Territorial House of Representatives from 1929 to 1933, serving as speaker from 1931 to 1933. He was a Republican.

== Personal life ==
His son, William, became a noted art dealer and critic in Juneau, Alaska. Winn died in 1943.
