= Lemonweir, Wisconsin =

- Town
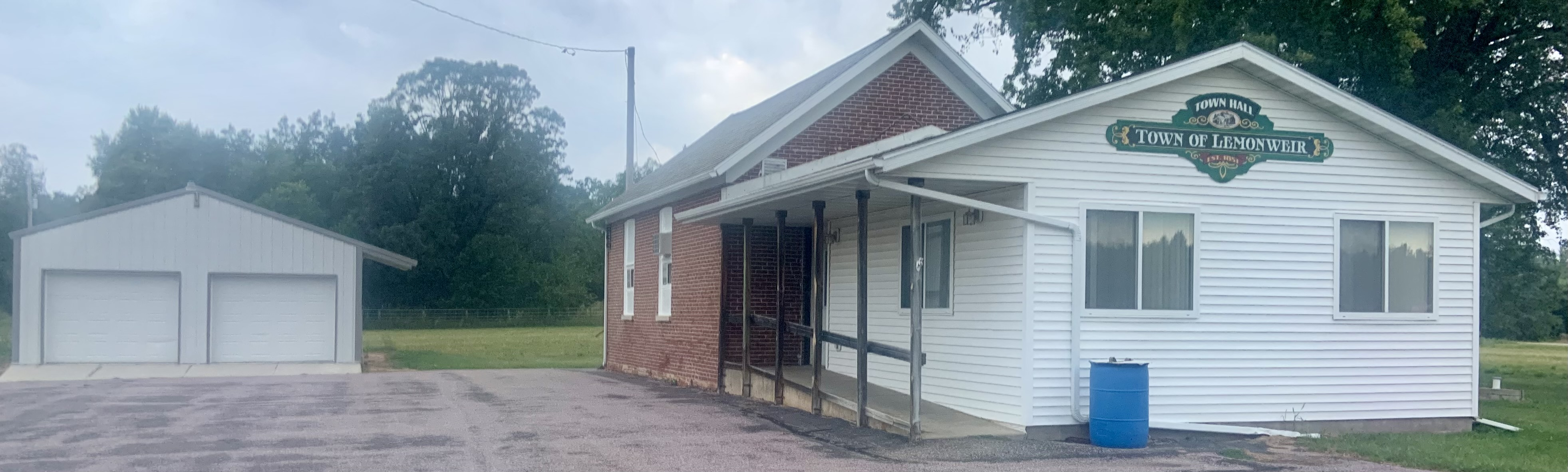
- Town hall

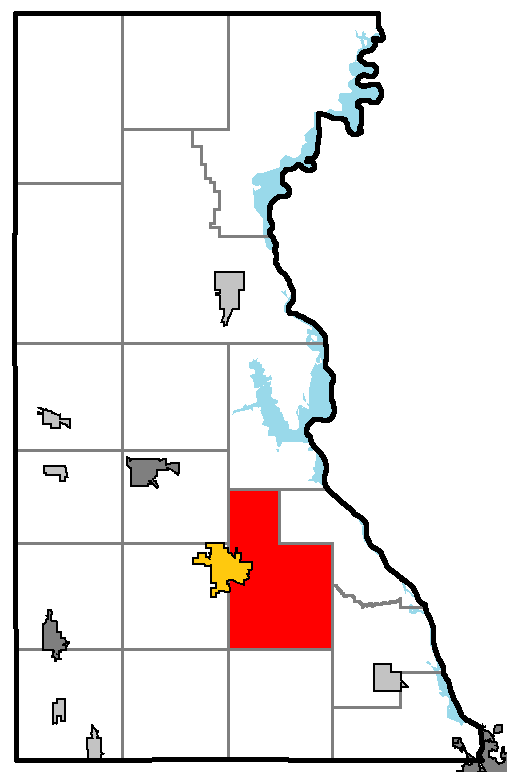
- Location of Lemonweir, Juneau County

- Location of Juneau County, Wisconsin
- Coordinates: 43°47′3″N 90°1′6″W
- Country: United States
- State: Wisconsin
- County: Juneau

Area
  - Total: 42.7 sq mi (110.5 km^{2})
  - Land: 42.6 sq mi (110.4 km^{2})
  - Water: 0.039 sq mi (0.1 km^{2})
- Elevation: 866 ft (264 m)

Population (2020)
  - Total: 1,658
  - Density: 38.90/sq mi (15.02/km^{2})
- Time zone: UTC-6 (Central (CST))
  - Summer (DST): UTC-5 (CDT)
- Area code: 608
- FIPS code: 55-43300
- GNIS feature ID: 1583539
- Website: https://www.townoflemonweirwi.gov/

Lemonweir is a town in Juneau County, Wisconsin, United States. The population was 1,658 at the 2020 census. The unincorporated community of Lemonweir is located in the town.

== Geography ==
According to the United States Census Bureau, the town has a total area of 42.7 square miles (110.5 km^{2}), of which 42.6 square miles (110.4 km^{2}) is land and 0.1 square mile (0.1 km^{2}) (0.12%) is water.

== Demographics ==
As of the census of 2000, there were 1,763 people, 679 households, and 513 families residing in the town. The population density was 41.4 people per square mile (16.0/km^{2}). There were 760 housing units at an average density of 17.8 per square mile (6.9/km^{2}). The racial makeup of the town was 97.45% White, 0.06% African American, 1.64% Native American, 0.11% Asian, 0.40% from other races, and 0.34% from two or more races. Hispanic or Latino of any race were 1.02% of the population.

There were 679 households, out of which 34.3% had children under the age of 18 living with them, 61.4% were married couples living together, 7.8% had a female householder with no husband present, and 24.4% were non-families. 20.0% of all households were made up of individuals, and 7.7% had someone living alone who was 65 years of age or older. The average household size was 2.60 and the average family size was 2.98.

In the town, the population was spread out, with 25.5% under the age of 18, 7.2% from 18 to 24, 29.0% from 25 to 44, 24.8% from 45 to 64, and 13.4% who were 65 years of age or older. The median age was 39 years. For every 100 females, there were 102.2 males. For every 100 females age 18 and over, there were 101.4 males.

The median income for a household in the town was $39,271, and the median income for a family was $41,875. Males had a median income of $30,000 versus $21,304 for females. The per capita income for the town was $16,815. About 8.8% of families and 10.0% of the population were below the poverty line, including 11.7% of those under age 18 and 9.1% of those age 65 or over.

== Notable people ==
- Pat W. Brunner, Wisconsin State Representative, was born in the town
