= Julius M. Engebretson =

American politician, businessman, and farmer

Julius M. Engebretson (December 25, 1864 – August 31, 1937) was an American politician, businessman, and farmer.

Engebretson was born in the town of Wiota, Lafayette County, Wisconsin. He was the son of Mathias Engebretson (1838–1926) and Guri Smedsrud Engebretson (1839–1912), both immigrants from Norway. Engebretson was a farmer and was involved with the Lafayette Mutual Fire Insurance Company. Engebretson served in the Wisconsin State Assembly from 1913 to 1919 and was a Republican. Later, he was involved with the Wisconsin Progressive Party. His son was George Engebretson who served in the Wisconsin State Senate. Engebretson died at his home in Wiota, Wisconsin.
