= Tustin, Wisconsin =

Census-designated place in Wisconsin, United States

- Census-designated place
- Location within Wisconsin
- Coordinates: 44°09′46″N 88°53′32″W
- Country: United States
- State: Wisconsin
- County: Waushara

Area
  - Total: 1.058 sq mi (2.74 km^{2})
  - Land: 1.058 sq mi (2.74 km^{2})
  - Water: 0 sq mi (0 km^{2})
- Elevation: 751 ft (229 m)

Population (2020)
  - Total: 120
  - Density: 110/sq mi (44/km^{2})
- Time zone: UTC-6 (Central (CST))
  - Summer (DST): UTC-5 (CDT)
- Area code: 920
- GNIS feature ID: 1575750

Tustin is a census-designated place in the Town of Bloomfield, Waushara County, Wisconsin, United States. As of the 2020 census, Tustin had a population of 120. Tustin is located on the northern shore of Lake Poygan.

== Notable people ==
- Robert H. Boyson, Wisconsin State Assemblyman, was born in Tustin.
