= Lemonweir (community), Wisconsin =

Lemonweir, Wisconsin
- Unincorporated community
- Location within Wisconsin Location within the United States
- Coordinates: 43°47′04″N 90°01′01″W
- Country: United States
- State: Wisconsin
- County: Jefferson
- Town: Lemonweir
- Elevation: 863 ft (263 m)
- Time zone: UTC-6 (Central (CST))
  - Summer (DST): UTC-5 (CDT)
- Area code: 608
- GNIS feature ID: 1567965

Lemonweir is an unincorporated community located in the town of Lemonweir, Juneau County, Wisconsin, United States. Lemonweir is located on County Highway N, 3 miles (4.8 km) east-southeast of Mauston. Known locally as "Lemonweir Mills," it was once an important mill settlement on the Lemonweir River, as the name suggests. It rivaled Mauston in size and potential until the railroad bypassed it. Aside from a few houses, nothing now remains.
