= Clyde Follansbee =

American politician

Clyde Follansbee was a member of the Wisconsin State Assembly.

== Biography ==
Follansbee was born on November 14, 1902, in Milwaukee, Wisconsin. During World War II, he served in the United States Army Signal Corps.

== Political career ==
Follansbee was elected to the Assembly in 1944. He was a Republican. He died in office of a heart attack on May 25, 1948, in Wood, Wisconsin.
