= Wiota (community), Wisconsin =

Census-designated place in Wisconsin, United States

Wiota, Wisconsin
- Census-designated place
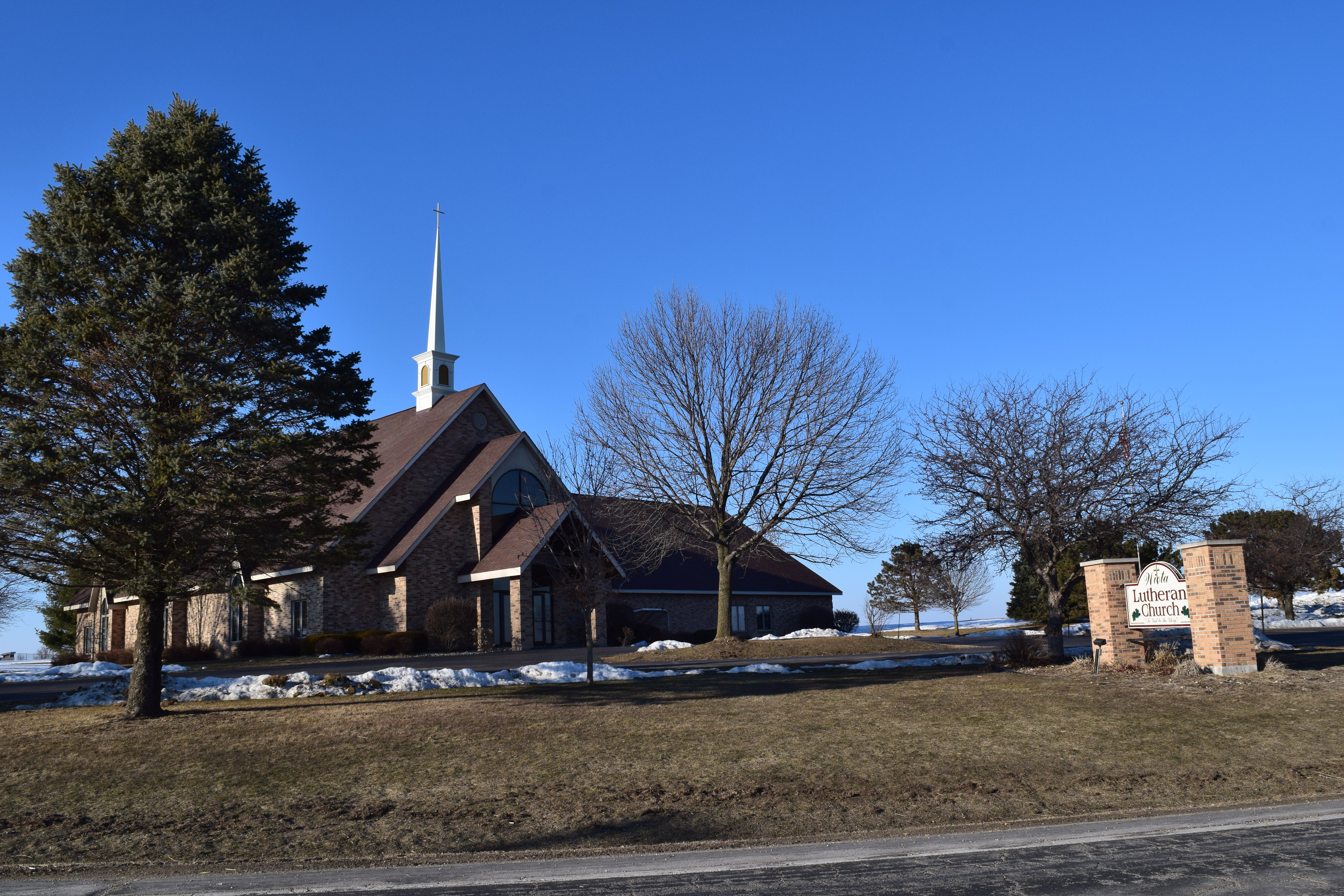
- Wiota Lutheran Church

- Location within Wisconsin Location within the United States
- Coordinates: 42°38′12″N 89°57′09″W
- Country: United States
- State: Wisconsin
- County: Lafayette
- Town: Wiota

Area
  - Total: 2.001 sq mi (5.18 km^{2})
  - Land: 2.001 sq mi (5.18 km^{2})
  - Water: 0 sq mi (0 km^{2})
- Elevation: 997 ft (304 m)

Population (2020)
  - Total: 71
  - Density: 35/sq mi (14/km^{2})
- Time zone: UTC-6 (Central (CST))
  - Summer (DST): UTC-5 (CDT)
- Area code: 608
- GNIS feature ID: 1576892
- FIPS code: 55-88025

Wiota is an unincorporated community and census-designated place (CDP) in the town of Wiota, Lafayette County, Wisconsin, United States. Wiota is located on Wisconsin Highway 78, 6.2 miles (10.0 km) southwest of Argyle. Its population was 71 as of the 2020 census.

== Geography ==
Wiota is in eastern Lafayette County, in the west-central part of the town of Wiota. According to the U.S. Census Bureau, the CDP has an area of 2.0 square miles (5.2 km^{2}), all land. The community sits on a ridge at the headwaters of Feather Branch, a southward-flowing tributary of the Pecatonica River.
