= Edward M. Schneider =

American politician

Edward M. Schneider (September 17, 1881 – March 25, 1946) was a Republican member of the Wisconsin State Assembly.

== Biography ==
Schneider was born on September 17, 1881, in Oshkosh, Wisconsin. He worked as a stenographer on the railroad, and as a bank director. He was an officer in a milling company. He served on the Winnebago County, Wisconsin Board of Supervisors from 1911 to 1914. Schneider was elected to the Assembly in 1944 and served until his death. He died on March 25, 1946.
