= John F. Lappen =

American wire weaver and politician

John F. Lappen (February 6, 1881 – October 2, 1945) was an American wire weaver and politician.

Born in Appleton, Wisconsin, Lappen was a wire weaver. From 1900 to 1903, Lappen served in the Wisconsin National Guard. From 1916 to 1923, Lappen served on the Appleton Common Council. He also served as sheriff of Outagamie County, Wisconsin. He also served as clerk of the local selective service board. From 1942 until 1945, Lappen served as a Wisconsin State Senator and was a Republican. Lappen died in Appleton, Wisconsin, of a heart ailment.
