= Henry Youngblood =

American politician

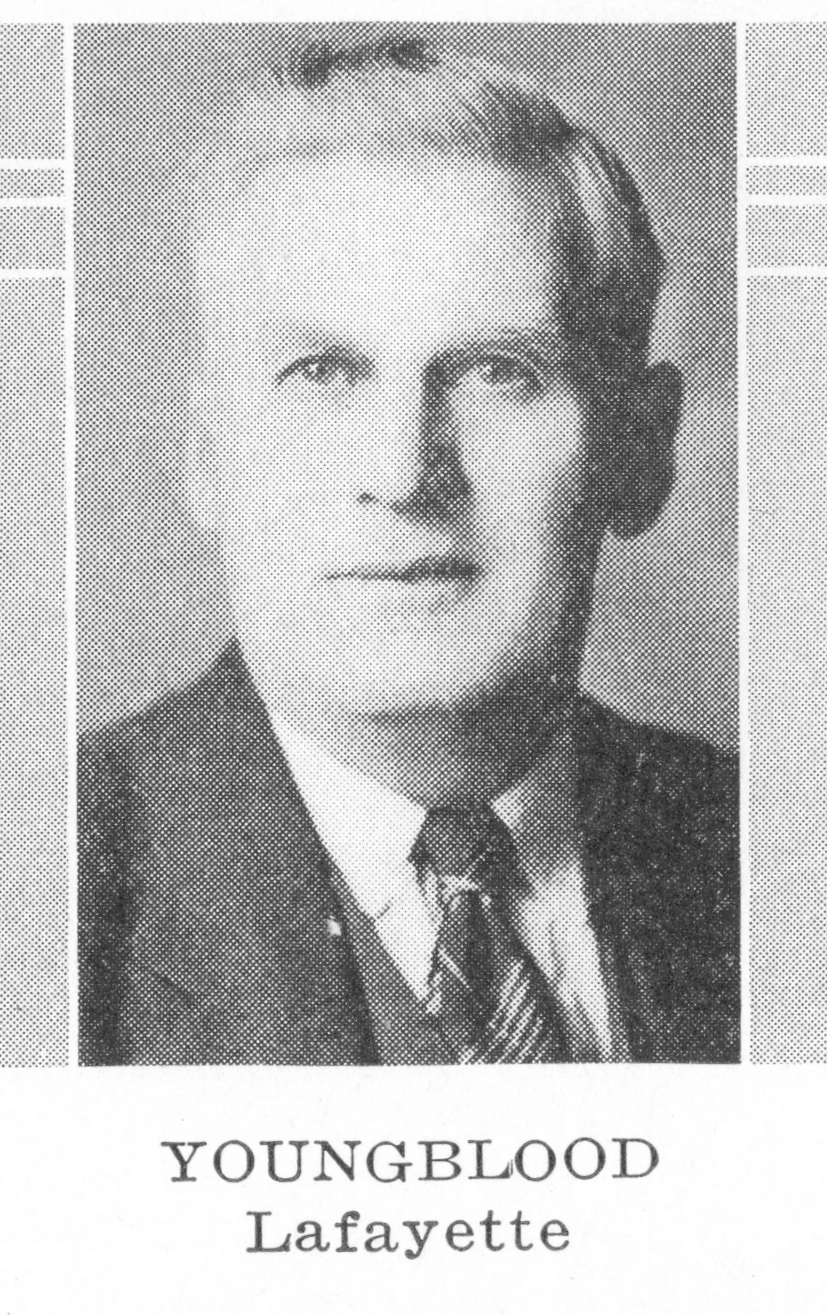
Henry Youngblood

Henry Youngblood (May 9, 1879 – February 19, 1960) was an American politician and member of the Wisconsin State Assembly.

== Biography ==
Youngblood was born on May 9, 1879, in Wiota, Wisconsin. He later resided in Woodford, Wisconsin.

== Career ==
Youngblood was a member of the Assembly from 1937 to 1946. Additionally, he was Supervisor of Woodford from 1926 to 1927 and Chairman of Woodford from 1928 to 1933. He was a Republican.
