= John Egan (Wisconsin politician) =

American politician

John Egan (February 28, 1876 – November 21, 1942) was an American teacher, conservation warden, and politician.

Born in the town of Centerville, Manitowoc County, Wisconsin, Egan went to Oshkosh Normal School (now University of Wisconsin–Oshkosh) and taught school. From 1912 to 1940, Egan was a conservation game warden and was involved with the Boy Scouts of America. In 1941, Egan served in the Wisconsin State Assembly as a Republican. In the United States November 1942 election, Egan was defeated for re-election to office. Egan died of a heart attack at his home in Manitowoc, Wisconsin before his term in office ended in January 1943.
