= John A. Zoller =

American electrical engineer and politician

John A. Zoller (October 23, 1889 – May 12, 1957) was an American electrical engineer and politician.

Born in Milwaukee, Wisconsin, Zoller served in the United States Army during World War I. He went to business colleges and worked as a stage electrician for Milwaukee theatres. Zoller was also involved with the local no. 18 International Alliance of Theatrical State Employees. In 1943, Zoller served in the Wisconsin State Assembly and was a Republican. Zoller died at the veterans hospital at Woods, Wisconsin.
