= William R. Foley =

American lawyer and politician

William R. Foley (May 11, 1908 – June 17, 1988) was an American lawyer and politician.

Born in Superior, Wisconsin, Foley went to the Superior State Teachers College and then received his law degree from University of Wisconsin Law School in 1931. From 1935 to 1941, he was an attorney in Washington, D.C. for the Reconstruction Finance Corporation. Foley then returned to Superior, Wisconsin to continue his law practice. In 1943, Foley served in the Wisconsin State Assembly as a Progressive. During World War II he served in the United States Armed Forces. In 1949, he was hired as the legal counsel for the United States House Committee on the Judiciary chaired by Rep. Emanuel Celler.

Foley died in Los Angeles, California.
