= Alvin J. Clasen =

American politician

Alvin J. Clasen (November 13, 1892 – October 1, 1971) was an American politician.

Born in Milwaukee, Wisconsin, he was the son of Charles A Clasen (1862–1944) and Sophia (Eschenburg) Clasen (1869–1947). Clasen served in the United States Army during World War I. Clasen went to Marquette University and was a laundry operator. In 1943, Clasen served in the Wisconsin State Assembly and was a Republican. In April 1944, Clasen was elected to the Milwaukee Common Council. Clasen died in Mequon, Wisconsin and was buried at Graceland Cemetery in Milwaukee County, Wisconsin.
