= Charles M. Fisher =

American politician

Charles M. Fisher (September 8, 1899 – May 16, 1966) was a member of the Wisconsin State Assembly. He was elected in 1944 as a Democrat.

Charles lived in Fifield, Wisconsin.

He is buried there, at the Forest Home Cemetery.
