= Ernest F. Storandt =

American politician (1882–1968)

Personal details
- Born: July 2, 1882 Burr Oak, Wisconsin, U.S.
- Died: September 1, 1968 (aged 86)
- Party: Republican
- Occupation: Politician

Ernest F. Storandt (July 2, 1882 – September 1, 1968) was an American politician who served as a member of the Wisconsin State Assembly.

== Biography ==
Storandt was born on July 2, 1882, in Burr Oak, Wisconsin. There, he opened a general store. He later operated a department store and a bakery. He died on September 1, 1968.

== Political career ==
Storandt was elected to the Assembly in 1944. Additionally, he was Postmaster of Burr Oak. He was a Republican.
