= Walter Tank =

American politician

Walter Tank (June 25, 1897 – November 1,1978) was an American politician.

Born in Oshkosh, Wisconsin, Tank served in the Motor Transport Corps during World War II. He was a truck driver and business agent. He served on the Oshkosh Common Council and was vice-mayor. In 1943, he served in the Wisconsin State Assembly as a Republican.
