= Orville Fehlhaber =

American politician and lawyer

Orville Walter Fehlhaber (March 16, 1903 – February 15, 1986) was an American lawyer and politician.

Born in Wausau, Wisconsin, Fehlhaber received his bachelor's degree from University of Wisconsin–Madison and his law degree from University of Wisconsin Law School. He practiced law in Wausau, Wisconsin. Fehlhaber served in the Wisconsin State Assembly in 1941 and was a Republican. He died in Bradenton, Florida.
