= Wood, Wisconsin =

Town of Wood, Wisconsin
- Town
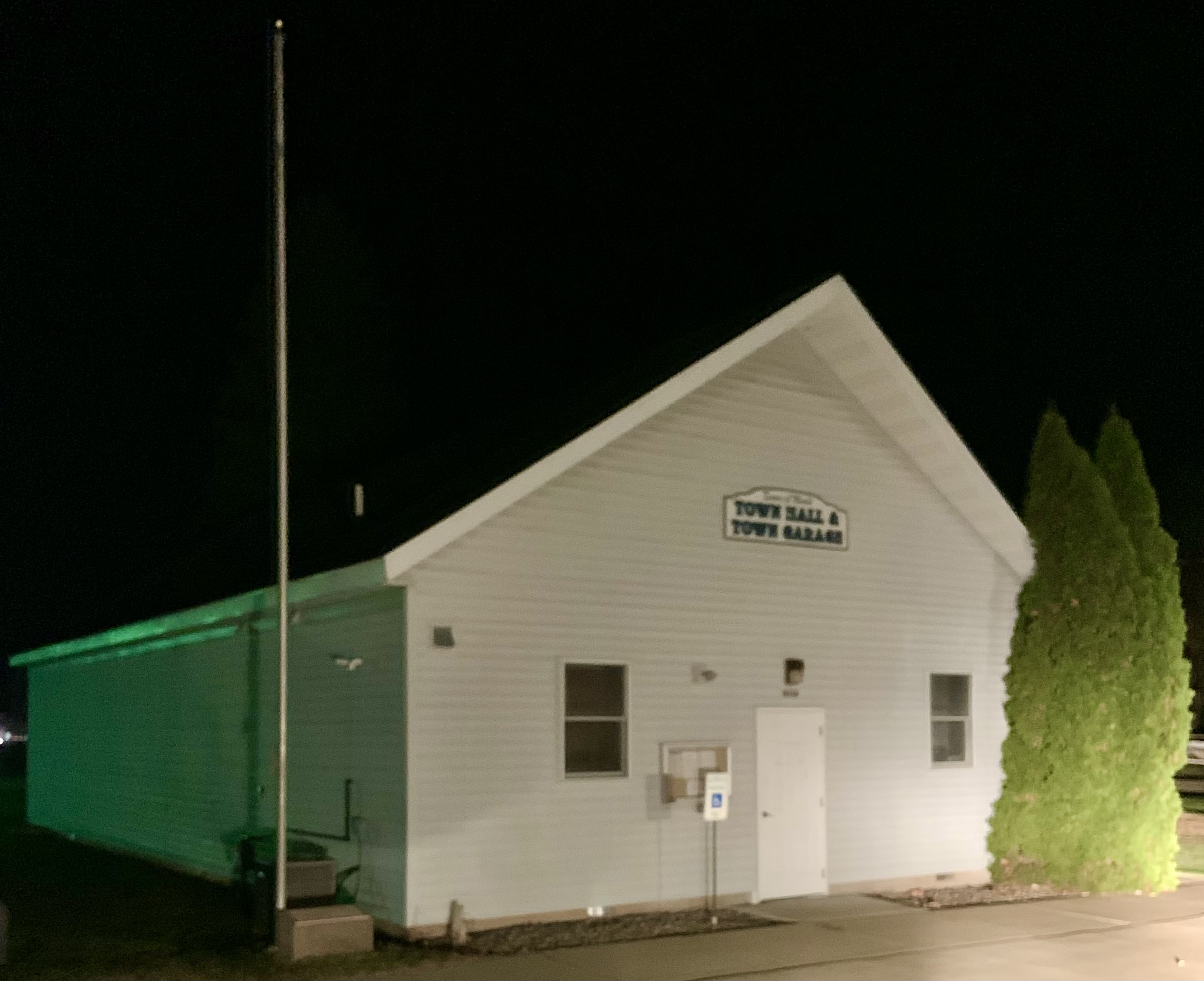
- Town hall in Pittsville

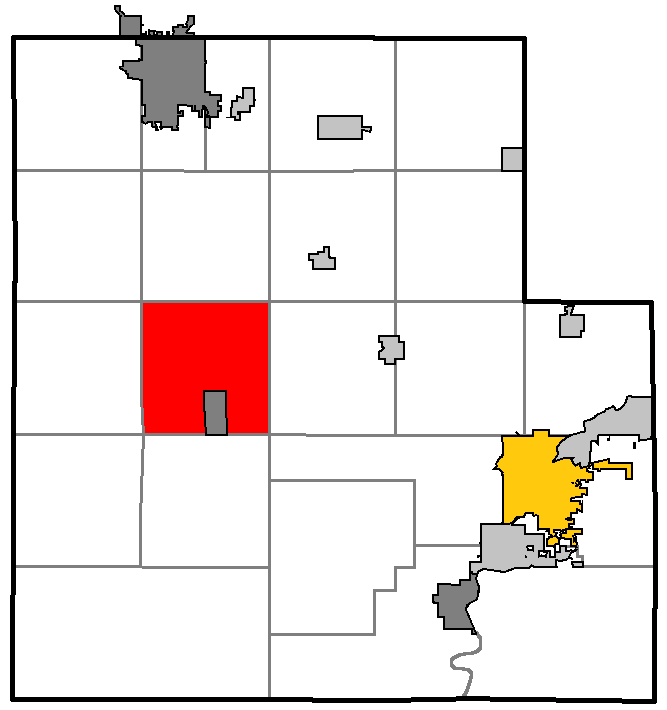
- Location of the Town of Wood, Wood County

- Location of Wood County, Wisconsin
- Coordinates: 44°28′19″N 90°8′32″W
- Country: United States
- State: Wisconsin
- County: Wood

Area
  - Total: 33.4 sq mi (86.4 km^{2})
  - Land: 33.3 sq mi (86.3 km^{2})
  - Water: 0.039 sq mi (0.1 km^{2})
- Elevation: 1,056 ft (322 m)

Population (2020)
  - Total: 757
  - Density: 22.7/sq mi (8.77/km^{2})
- Time zone: UTC-6 (Central (CST))
  - Summer (DST): UTC-5 (CDT)
- Area codes: 715 & 534
- FIPS code: 55-88575
- GNIS feature ID: 1584472
- PLSS township: T23N R3E
- Website: https://townofwoodwi.com/

The Town of Wood is located in Wood County, Wisconsin, United States. The population was 757 at the 2020 census.

This town is sometime mistaken for the discontinued post office of Wood, Milwaukee County, Wisconsin (zip code 53193) that served the Veterans Administration Medical Center near Milwaukee (current address 5000 West National Ave. Milwaukee, WI 53295).

== Geography ==
According to the United States Census Bureau, the town has a total area of 33.3 square miles (86.4 km^{2}), of which 33.3 square miles (86.3 km^{2}) is land and 0.04 square mile (0.1 km^{2}) (0.12%) is water.

== History ==
In the summer of 1851 a crew working for the U.S. government surveyed the outline of the six mile square that would become Wood. That November another crew marked all the section corners, walking through the woods and wading the swamps, measuring with chain and compass. When done, the deputy surveyor filed this general description:

There is very little good land in this Township it may be considered as 2d rate the timber is generall good except the Pine although there is some good Pine along the Banks of Yellow River mixed in with hard timber the surface is generall level & somewhat stony particularly near(?) Yellow River which passes over almost entirely a Bed of Rocks the stone are a Reddish sandstone the timber is of various Kinds, such as Birch Pine Maple Linn Elm Tamarack etc(?) the small streams are fed by the swamp and are not durable the Saw Mills under process of Erection are probably worth $500 each.

The town of Wood was larger when it was formed in 1874, but the town of Cary was split off in 1901. The town was then called the town of New Wood for a few months until the name was changed back.

== Demographics ==
As of the census of 2000, there were 786 people, 285 households, and 222 families residing in the town. The population density was 23.6 people per square mile (9.1/km^{2}). There were 309 housing units at an average density of 9.3 per square mile (3.6/km^{2}). The racial makeup of the town was 99.24% White, 0.13% African American, 0.51% Native American and 0.13% Asian. Hispanic or Latino of any race were 0.13% of the population.

There were 285 households, out of which 34.4% had children under the age of 18 living with them, 66.3% were married couples living together, 4.9% had a female householder with no husband present, and 22.1% were non-families. 16.5% of all households were made up of individuals, and 4.9% had someone living alone who was 65 years of age or older. The average household size was 2.76 and the average family size was 3.12.

In the town, the population was spread out, with 24.7% under the age of 18, 8.4% from 18 to 24, 27.9% from 25 to 44, 26.1% from 45 to 64, and 13.0% who were 65 years of age or older. The median age was 39 years. For every 100 females, there were 112.4 males. For every 100 females age 18 and over, there were 116.1 males.

The median income for a household in the town was $44,853, and the median income for a family was $47,955. Males had a median income of $38,333 versus $22,321 for females. The per capita income for the town was $18,534. About 6.4% of families and 6.7% of the population were below the poverty line, including 13.4% of those under age 18 and none of those age 65 or over.
