= Fred L. Feierstein =

American farmer, businessman, and politician

Fred L. Feierstein (May 7, 1903 – October 29, 1945) was an American farmer, businessman, and politician.

Born in the town of Belgium in Ozaukee County, Wisconsin, Feierstein owned a cheese factory, restaurant and bus stop, and was in the real estate business. He served as town clerk for the town of Belgium. Feierstein then lived in the town of Fredonia where he owned and operated the restaurant and bus stop. He served in the Wisconsin State Assembly, as a Republican in 1945 until his death. Feirstein died as a result of a road accident when his car collided with a truck on Wisconsin Highway 53.
