= Carl C. Christensen =

American businessman and politician

Carl C. Christensen (October 1, 1891 – June 20, 1956) was an American businessman and politician.

Born in Racine, Wisconsin, Christensen went to school in Racine and to LaSalle College. He served in the United States Army during World War I. He owned a service station in Racine for thirty years. Christensen served on the Racine Common Council from 1926 to 1933 and from 1937 to 1945 and on the Racine Board of Health. From 1943 to 1947, Christensen served in the Wisconsin State Assembly and was a Republican. In 1954, he ran in the Wisconsin State Senate election and lost. Christensen died suddenly of a heart attack while playing golf in Racine, Wisconsin.
