= Charles Ebert =

American politician (1885–1983)

Charles Joseph Ebert (April 30, 1885 - June 29, 1983) was a member of the Wisconsin State Assembly.

== Biography ==
Ebert was born on April 30, 1885, in Seymour, Wisconsin. He became a bank director, cheese maker and operator of a cold storage plant.

== Political career ==
Ebert was first elected to the assembly in 1940. Additionally, he was president of Gresham, Wisconsin, and a member of the Shawano County, Wisconsin, board. He was a Republican.
