= Robert H. Boyson =

American farmer, businessman, and politician

Robert H. Boyson (June 9, 1893 – November 24, 1977) was an American farmer, businessman, and politician.

Born in Tustin, Waushara County, Wisconsin, Boyson served in the United States Army during World War I. He was a farmer and owned a general store and a saloon. He was a horse, cattle, and automobile dealer. Boyson served as sheriff and deputy sheriff for Waushara County for four years and was a Republican. Boyson served on the school board and was the board clerk. In 1941 and 1943, Boyson served in the Wisconsin State Assembly. Boyson died of a heart attack near Poy Sippi, Wisconsin on Thanksgiving Day while deer hunting.
