= James C. Fritzen =

American politician

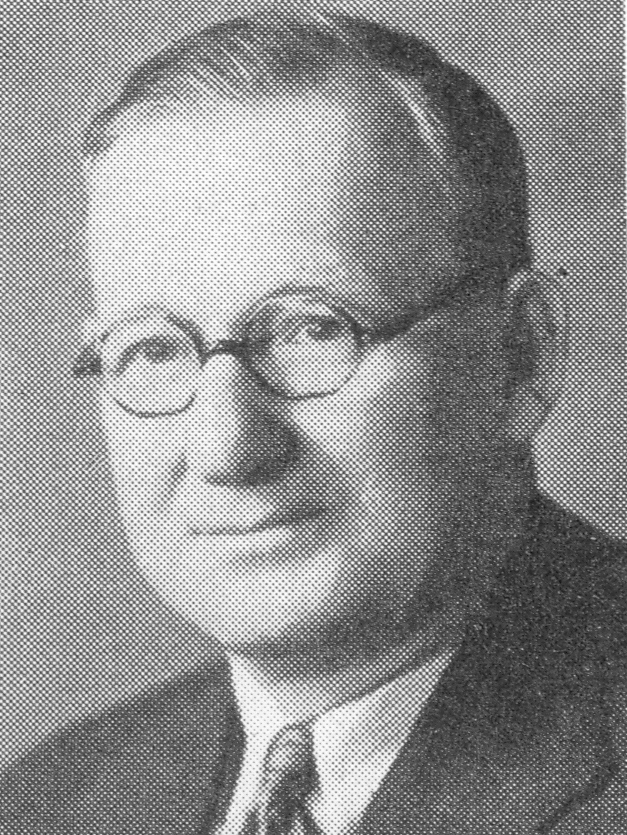
Fritzen circa 1940

James C. Fritzen (1889-1945) was a member of the Wisconsin State Assembly.

== Biography ==
Fritzen was born on April 14, 1889, in Neenah, Wisconsin. He worked in the grocery retail business. During World War I, he served in the United States Army. He died on October 11, 1945.

== Political career ==
Fritzen was a member of the Assembly from 1939 until his death. Previously, he was a member of the Winnebago County, Wisconsin Board from 1922 to 1927 and Postmaster of Neenah from 1927 to 1935. He was a Republican.
