= William Nawrocki =

American politician

William Nawrocki (December 4, 1899, in Milwaukee, Wisconsin – ?), was an American politician, who served as a member of the Wisconsin State Assembly. He would become a shoe worker and a stock clerk.

== Political career ==
Nawrocki was elected to the Assembly in 1940. Additionally, he was a member of the Milwaukee County, Wisconsin Committee from 1937 to 1940. He was a Democrat.
