= Frank D. Sheahan =

American politician

Frank D. Sheahan (December 30, 1901 – January 20, 1974) was an American politician.

Born in Superior, Wisconsin, Sheahan went to business school and worked as the chief bill clerk and cashier for the Northern Pacific Railway. He was also involved with the Brotherhood of Railway Clerks. Sheahan served on the Superior Common Council, the Superior Police and Fire Commission, and the city planning commission. In 1941 and 1945, Sheahan served in the Wisconsin State Assembly and was elected on the Wisconsin Progressive Party ticket.
