= Mark Catlin Jr. =

American politician (1910–1987)

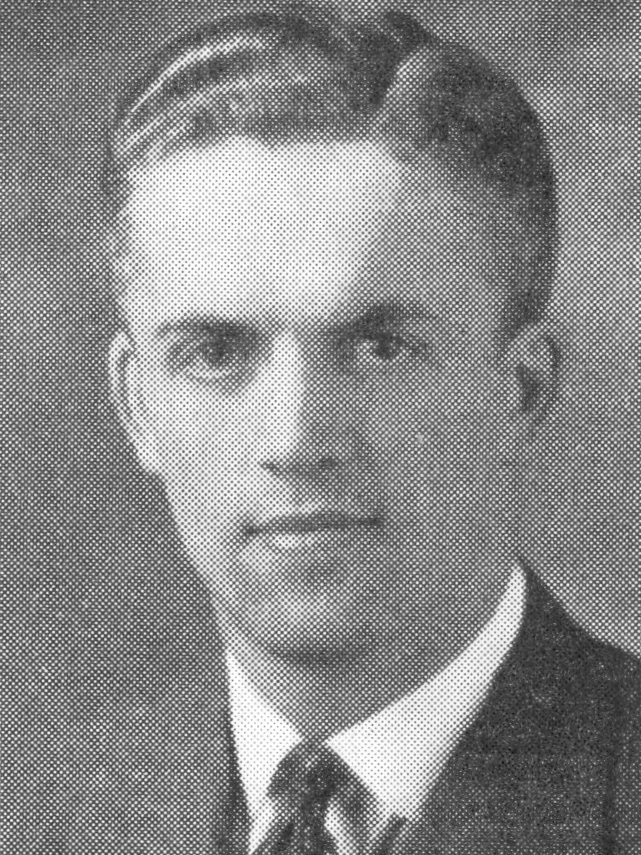
Catlin circa 1940

Mark Catlin Jr. (October 18, 1910 – January 23, 1987) was a Wisconsin Republican politician and legislator.

Born in Appleton, Wisconsin, Catlin graduated from the University of Wisconsin–Madison and became a lawyer. His father was the college football coach Mark Catlin Sr., who was also a lawyer and legislator.

Catlin served in the Wisconsin State Assembly in 1937–1943, 1949–1951, and 1953–1957; Catlin also served as Speaker of the Assembly in the 1955 session and was a Republican.

In 1957, the State Bar of Wisconsin found Catlin guilty of unethical conduct; the ruling was upheld by the Wisconsin Supreme Court and he was fined $1500 and his law license was suspended for six months.
