= Pat W. Brunner =

American farmer, stationary engineer, and politician

Patrick W. Brunner (September 8, 1903 – April 2, 1971) was an American farmer, stationary engineer, and politician.

Born in the town of Lemonweir, Juneau County, Wisconsin, Brunner went to school in Mauston, Wisconsin. He then farmed and later was a stationary engineer. He was also in general merchandising. Brunner lived in Lyndon Station, Wisconsin. From 1941 to 1947, Brunner served in the Wisconsin State Assembly as a Republican. In 1948, Brunner moved to Madison, Wisconsin where he worked as a stationary engineer for the United States Forest Products Laboratory. In 1968, Brunner moved to Wausau, Wisconsin. Brunner died in Wausau, Wisconsin of a heart attack.
