= Woodford, Wisconsin =

Census-designated place in Wisconsin, United States

- Census-designated place
- Location within Wisconsin Location within the United States
- Coordinates: 42°38′55″N 89°51′45″W
- Country: United States
- State: Wisconsin
- County: Lafayette
- Town: Wiota

Area
  - Total: 0.254 sq mi (0.66 km^{2})
  - Land: 0.241 sq mi (0.62 km^{2})
  - Water: 0.013 sq mi (0.034 km^{2})
- Elevation: 794 ft (242 m)

Population (2020)
  - Total: 71
  - Density: 290/sq mi (110/km^{2})
- Time zone: UTC-6 (Central (CST))
  - Summer (DST): UTC-5 (CDT)
- ZIP code: 53599
- Area code: 608
- GNIS feature ID: 1576987
- FIPS code: 55-88675

Woodford is an unincorporated community and census-designated place (CDP) in Lafayette County, Wisconsin, United States. Woodford is south of Argyle, in the Town of Wiota. Woodford has a post office with ZIP code 53599. As of the 2020 census, its population was 71, up from 69 at the 2010 census.

== Geography ==
Woodford is in eastern Lafayette County, in the eastern part of the town of Woodford. It sits in a valley on the east side of the East Branch Pecatonica River, 7 miles (11 km) by road south of the village of Argyle and 15 miles (24 km) east of Darlington, the Lafayette county seat. According to the U.S. Census Bureau, the CDP has a total area of 0.25 square miles (0.65 km^{2}), of which 0.01 square miles (0.03 km^{2}), or 5.12%, are water.
