= Charles F. Westfahl =

American politician

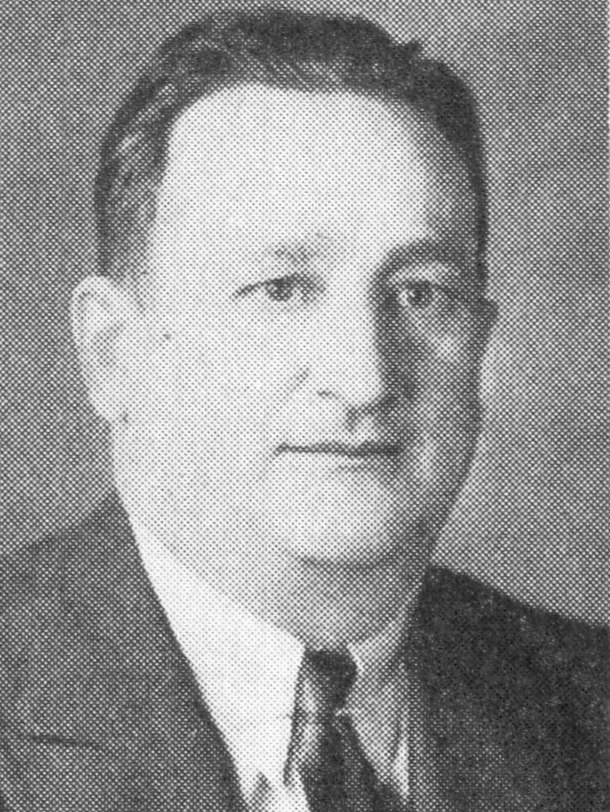
Westfahl circa 1940

Charles Frederick Westfahl (April 10, 1885 - July 6, 1966) was a member of the Wisconsin State Assembly.

== Biography ==
Westfahl was born on April 10, 1885, in Milwaukee, Wisconsin. He would go on to attend business school and work as a war production mechanic during World War I.

== Political career ==
Westfahl was twice a member of the Assembly. First, from 1931 to 1932, and second, from 1939 to 1950. Both times he was a Republican. In 1956, Westfahl ran again for the Assembly as a Democrat, losing to Jerris Leonard.
