= Wiota, Wisconsin =

Wiota, Wisconsin Hamilton's Diggings
- Town
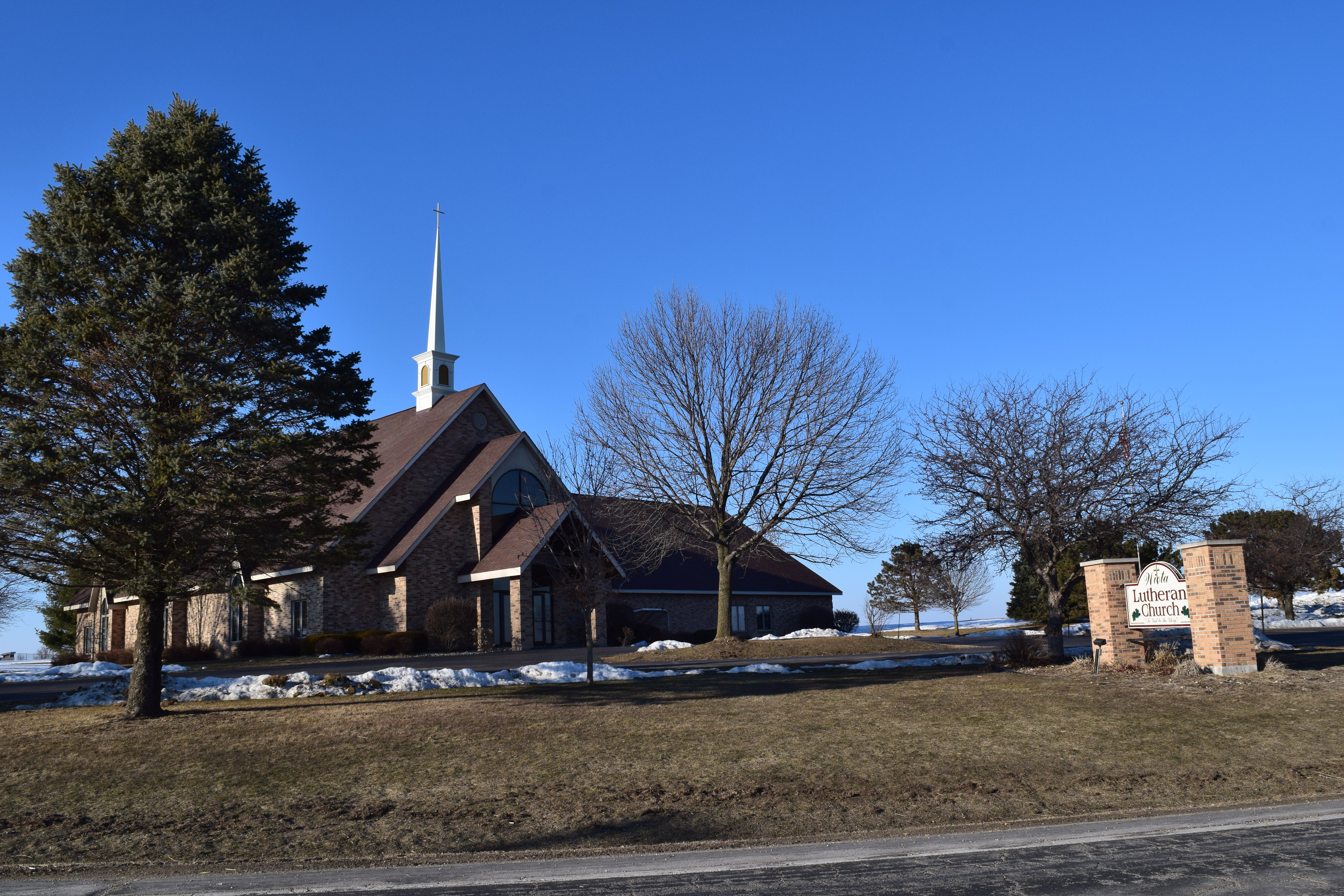
- Wiota Lutheran Church

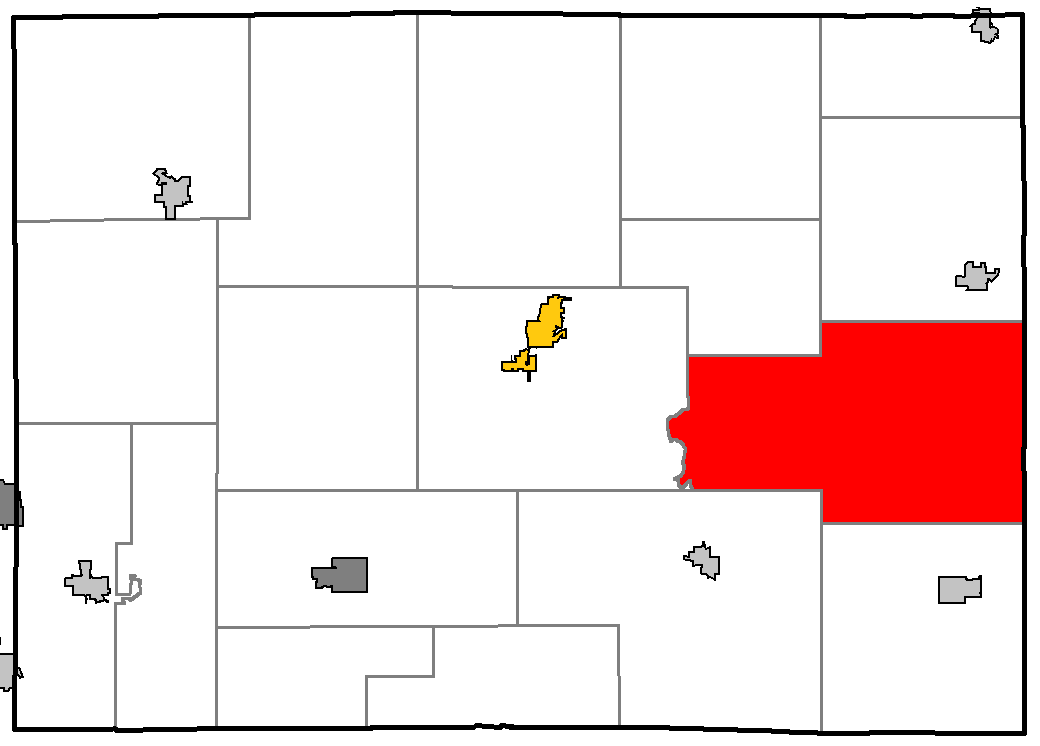
- Location of Wiota, within Lafayette County, Wisconsin

- Location within Wisconsin Location within the United States
- Coordinates: 42°38′12″N 89°57′09″W
- Country: United States
- State: Wisconsin
- County: Lafayette
- Founded: 1828

Area
  - Total: 52.82 sq mi (136.8 km^{2})
  - Land: 52.80 sq mi (136.8 km^{2})
  - Water: 0.03 sq mi (0.078 km^{2})
- Elevation: 997 ft (304 m)

Population (2020)
  - Total: 830
  - Density: 16/sq mi (6.1/km^{2})
- Time zone: UTC-6 (CST)
  - Summer (DST): UTC-5 (CDT)
- ZIP Codes: 53587 (South Wayne); 53599 (Woodford); 53504 (Argyle); 53530 (Darlington); 53541 (Gratiot); 53522 (Browntown)
- Area code: 608
- FIPS code: 55-065-88050
- Website: www.townofwiota.com

Wiota is a town in Lafayette County, Wisconsin, United States. The population was 830 at the 2020 census. The unincorporated communities of Wiota, Woodford and Five Corners are located in the town.

== History ==
When William S. Hamilton, the son of Alexander Hamilton, migrated from Illinois to Wisconsin in the late 1820s, he established a lead ore mine that became known as Hamilton's Diggings. He later renamed the settlement Wiota. Hamilton, along with Elias Shook and William Haws, settled the area in 1828 and quickly struck quality deposits of lead ore. During the 1832 Black Hawk War, a fort was erected at Hamilton's Diggings, which was known as Fort Hamilton. Wiota was first platted in 1836 by Hamilton, and though a few buildings were built, the settlement was eventually moved from the Hamilton's Diggings site to its present site, which was platted on July 1, 1858.

Wiota was the location of one of the earliest Norwegian settlements in the United States, begun by immigrants traveling from Chicago, including Per Ivarson Undi, in 1841. The East Wiota Lutheran Church, dedicated in 1852, is the oldest continually running Norwegian Lutheran church in America. Johan Storm Munch was an early pastor at the church. His wife, Caja, kept a diary of their time in Wiota that has since been published as The Strange American Way.

== Geography ==
Wiota is in eastern Lafayette County, bordered to the east by Green County. According to the United States Census Bureau, the town has a total area of 52.8 square miles (136.8 km^{2}), of which 0.03 square miles (0.07 km^{2}), or 0.05%, are water. The western border of the town follows the Pecatonica River, and the river's East Branch flows southward through the east side of the town.

== Demographics ==
Historical population
Census	Pop.	Note	%±
2000	900		—
2010	856		−4.9%
2020	830		−3.0%

As of the census of 2000, there were 900 people, 331 households, and 249 families residing in the town. The population density was 17.1 people per square mile (6.6/km^{2}). There were 364 housing units at an average density of 6.9 per square mile (2.7/km^{2}). The racial makeup of the town was 99.00% White, 0.22% African American, 0.11% Native American, 0.11% Asian, and 0.56% from two or more races. Hispanic or Latino of any race were 0.56% of the population.

There were 331 households, out of which 36.9% had children under the age of 18 living with them, 65.0% were married couples living together, 6.6% had a female householder with no husband present, and 24.5% were non-families. 19.3% of all households were made up of individuals, and 9.1% had someone living alone who was 65 years of age or older. The average household size was 2.69 and the average family size was 3.12.

In the town, the population was spread out, with 28.2% under the age of 18, 5.2% from 18 to 24, 29.3% from 25 to 44, 23.6% from 45 to 64, and 13.7% who were 65 years of age or older. The median age was 39 years. For every 100 females, there were 94.0 males. For every 100 females age 18 and over, there were 98.2 males.

The median income for a household in the town was $40,000, and the median income for a family was $43,611. Males had a median income of $22,440 versus $22,708 for females. The per capita income for the town was $18,176. About 2.6% of families and 6.3% of the population were below the poverty line, including 9.0% of those under age 18 and 7.6% of those age 65 or over.

== Notable people ==
- George Engebretson, Wisconsin state senator
- Julius M. Engebretson, Wisconsin state representative; born in Wiota
- Martin O. Monson, Wisconsin state representative
- Johan Storm Munch, a prominent early pastor of the Wiota Norwegian Lutheran Church
- Per Ivarson Undi, an early Norwegian settler, and first from the county of Sogn og Fjordane; lived in Wiota and enticed others to emigrate
- Ezra Wescott, Wisconsin state representative; taught school in Wiota
- Grover C. Winn, Alaska territorial legislator; born in Wiota
