= Gardner R. Withrow =

American politician (1892–1964)

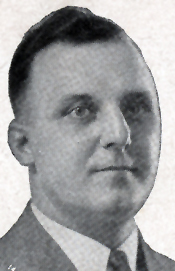

Member of the U.S. House of Representatives from Wisconsin
- In office January 3, 1949 – January 3, 1961
- Preceded by: William H. Stevenson
- Succeeded by: Vernon W. Thomson
- Constituency: 3rd district
- In office March 4, 1933 – January 3, 1939
- Preceded by: John M. Nelson
- Succeeded by: Harry W. Griswold
- Constituency: 3rd district
- In office March 4, 1931 – March 3, 1933
- Preceded by: Merlin Hull
- Succeeded by: Gerald J. Boileau
- Constituency: 7th district

Member of the Wisconsin State Assembly from the La Crosse 1st district
- In office January 3, 1927 – January 7, 1929
- Preceded by: James D. H. Peterson
- Succeeded by: John Mulder

Personal details
- Born: October 5, 1892 La Crosse, Wisconsin, U.S.
- Died: September 23, 1964 (aged 71) La Crosse, Wisconsin, U.S.
- Resting place: Oak Grove Cemetery, La Crosse
- Party: Republican; Progressive (1934–1946)
- Spouses: Martha Amelia Riehl (died 1944); Anne L. Gilligan (m. 1946–1964)
- Occupation: Railroad conductor, union representative, politician

Military service
- Allegiance: United States
- Branch/service: Wisconsin National Guard
- Years of service: 1916
- Unit: 3rd Reg. Wis. Infantry
- Battles/wars: Pancho Villa Expedition

Gardner Robert Withrow (October 5, 1892 – September 23, 1964) was an American union representative and Progressive Republican politician from La Crosse, Wisconsin. He served ten terms in the U.S. House of Representatives, representing western Wisconsin from 1931 to 1939, then again from 1949 to 1961. During his first term, he represented Wisconsin's 7th congressional district, for the other nine terms he represented Wisconsin's 3rd congressional district. Before being elected to congress, he served one term in the Wisconsin State Assembly (1927). He was a fourth cousin of Abraham Lincoln.

== Early life ==
Gardner Withrow was born, raised, and lived most of his life in La Crosse, Wisconsin. After graduating from high school, he briefly studied law under his brother, Frank E. Withrow, but ultimately went to work for the Chicago, Burlington and Quincy Railroad as a fireman and conductor. Through his employment, he became a member of the Brotherhood of Railroad Trainmen labor union. During World War I, he served eight months on active duty with the Wisconsin National Guard in the 3rd Wisconsin Infantry Regiment, and supported the Pancho Villa Expedition on the Mexico border.

In early 1926, Withrow was charged with assault for allegedly punching the operator of a streetcar which collided with his car. His brother, Frank, served as his defense attorney and the jury acquitted him after 12 minutes of deliberation.

== Political career ==
By 1925, Withrow was selected by his union to serve as one of their lobbyists to the state legislature. Through his political activities, he also became a member of the La Follette Progressive Republican Committee of La Crosse County. In 1926, he won the Republican nomination for Wisconsin State Assembly in La Crosse County's 1st district (comprising most of the city of La Crosse). Withrow easily prevailed in the general election with 68% of the vote. During the 1927 legislative term, Governor Fred R. Zimmerman, a stalwart Republican, sought to lower the income tax and offset the revenue by raising the property tax. Withrow was a leader of the progressive resistance to those measures, describing it as an attempt to raise taxes on farmers to reduce taxes on wealthy business owners.

=== First election to congress ===
Wisconsin's 7th congressional district 1912–1931

In 1928, U.S. representative Joseph D. Beck announced he would run for Governor of Wisconsin rather than seeking another term in Congress. Withrow chose to abandon his Assembly re-election to enter the Republican primary to succeed Beck as representative of Wisconsin's 7th congressional district. The progressive Republicans of the district quickly rallied around Withrow, but several other prominent politicians joined the race anyway, including Merlin Hull, a former secretary of state who ran in the primary two previous times, and Otto Bosshard and Alexander Frederick, who had both served several terms in the Assembly. Withrow ultimately fell 2,300 votes short of Merlin Hull, who won the primary with 35% of the vote.

Withrow ran again in 1930, launching a primary challenge against Hull. Withrow sought to emphasize his campaign as supporting farmers' interests against the business interests which he alleged were represented by his stalwart Republican opponent. This time there were no other candidates in the race; Withrow won the head-to-head primary against Hull with 52% of the vote. He faced only a Prohibition Party opponent in the general election, but Hull received a large number of write-in votes. Withrow prevailed with 82% of the vote.

The 72nd Congress was one of the most closely divided in American history. Withrow and seven other Wisconsin progressive Republicans led a faction of holdouts which refused to help organize the House until Republican leadership agreed to several of their policy prescriptions for the Great Depression. Their demands included support for unemployment and agricultural relief programs. However, the issue became moot as Democrats took the majority before Republicans could pass an organizing resolution.

Wisconsin's 3rd congressional district 1932–1963

Due to the Reapportionment Act of 1929, Wisconsin lost a congressional seat in reapportionment following the 1930 United States census. This resulted in a significant redrawing of Wisconsin's congressional districts. Under the new plan, passed during a special session of the 1931 legislature, Withrow resided in Wisconsin's 3rd congressional district—roughly the southwest quadrant of the state. In the new district, Withrow faced another difficult primary against a stalwart Republican opponent, Charles A. Dittman. Withrow prevailed with 58% of the vote. In the 1932 general election, a Democratic wave saw Republicans lose 101 seats, but Withrow easily defeated his Democratic opponent, attorney John J. Boyle.

During the 73rd Congress, Withrow supported several of the new initiatives of Democratic president Franklin D. Roosevelt. In the midst of the 1934 West Coast waterfront strike, Withrow led a successful bipartisan effort to bring a vote on a 30-hour work week for railroad employees, gathering enough signatures on a discharge petition to force a vote on his bill. But the House Committee with jurisdiction then voted to report the bill without their recommendation, which effectively killed it.

=== Progressive party ===
In May 1934, the Wisconsin Progressive Party officially split from the Republican Party of Wisconsin after three decades of bitter primary battles and intra-party feuding. Withrow did not attend the Progressive Party's organizing convention, but said he would poll his constituents and abide by their sentiment as to the split. Withrow formally announced in July 1934 that he would run for re-election on the Progressive Party ticket. In the 1934 election, Withrow easily won his third term in Congress, defeating Republican Levi H. Bancroft and Democrat Bart E. McGonigle. During the 74th Congress, Withrow continued to vote in support of New Deal programs, and also supported the Democratic attempts to curb the power of the Supreme Court in response to their striking down several New Deal programs. He won re-election again in 1936 with 51% of the vote. He also pushed for benefits and compensation for the Bonus Army. The Recession of 1937–1938 and backlash against Roosevelt led to a Republican resurgence in 1938; Withrow lost re-election, along with five of the seven other progressives in Congress.

He was succeeded by Republican Harry W. Griswold, who died of a heart attack less than a year later. Despite the vacancy, there was no special election called by Governor Julius P. Heil and the seat remained empty for three quarters of the 76th Congress. Withrow chose to run again for the seat in 1940, but lost a close election to Republican William H. Stevenson. In 1940, Withrow was opposed to the United States entering World War II, but in announcing his campaign in 1942, he made it clear that he then supported prosecuting the war to victory. Throughout the 1942 campaign, he made significant efforts to distance himself from past isolationist positions and criticized his Republican rival for his votes against pre-war preparedness policies. Withrow fell short again in another close election; Stevenson winning the election with 47% of the vote.

While out of office, Withrow returned to lobbying on behalf of the railroad brotherhood in Madison, Wisconsin. He also served as a mediator in labor disputes. In 1946, the Progressive Party disbanded with the majority of delegates voting to return to the Republican Party. Withrow followed that move and rejoined the Republican Party. He ran for sheriff of La Crosse County that fall, but lost the primary to Vernon H. Lamp.

=== Return to congress ===
Undeterred by four straight election losses, Withrow announced in 1948 that he would launch a primary challenge against William H. Stevenson to reclaim the 3rd congressional district seat he had previously represented. His campaign announcement listed a number of political grievances against Stevenson, saying he had been silent on the economic pain of his constituents and the problems faced by organized labor, and again criticized Stevenson for isolationist votes and their potential economic impact in Wisconsin. Withrow prevailed by about 1400 votes in the Republican primary, and went on to an easy victory in the general election.

He faced another difficult primary in 1950, against state senator Foster B. Porter and businessman Joseph F. Walsh. Withrow survived by just 879 votes, receiving 36% in the primary. Nevertheless, Withrow still won a substantial victory in the general election over Democratic nominee Patrick Lucey. William H. Stevenson returned for a rematch in the 1952 Republican primary, but Withrow prevailed again in another close election.

In 1958, Withrow was involved in a controversy due to his association with Dominican dictator Rafael Trujillo. Withrow was counted among Trujillo's defenders in Congress at a time when he was receiving American aide and his political enemies were dying mysterious deaths in the United States, but no illicit relationship was ever alleged or proved.

Throughout his career, he remained a progressive Republican; he voted in favor of the Civil Rights Acts of 1957 and 1960.

In October 1959, Withrow announced that he would retire at the end of the 81st Congress.

== Personal life and family ==
Gardner Withrow was the third son of Thomas C. Withrow and his wife Helen E. (née Baxter). Gardner's elder brother, Frank Edwin Withrow, was a prominent lawyer in La Crosse for 59 years; at the time of his death he was described as the dean of the La Crosse bar. Withrow was a fourth cousin of Abraham Lincoln; his paternal grandmother, Elizabeth Hanks, was a descendant of Lincoln's great-great-great-grandfather, William Hanks Sr.

Gardner Withrow married twice. His first wife was Martha Amelia Riehl, who died in 1944. Two years later, he remarried with Anne L. Gilligan. He had no children from either marriage.

Gardner Withrow died at a La Crosse hospital after a long illness. He was interred at La Crosse's Oak Grove Cemetery.

== Electoral history ==
=== Wisconsin Assembly (1926) ===
| Year | Election | Date | Elected | | | | Defeated | | | | Total | Plurality |
|---|---|---|---|---|---|---|---|---|---|---|---|---|
| 1926 | General | Nov. 2 | Gardner R. Withrow | Republican | 4,149 | 68.61% | E. J. Kneen | Dem. | 1,701 | 28.13% | 6,047 | 2,448 |
| 1926 | General | Nov. 2 | Gardner R. Withrow | Republican | 4,149 | 68.61% | D. C. Chappel | Proh. | 197 | 3.26% | 6,047 | 2,448 |

=== U.S. House, Wisconsin 7th district (1928, 1930) ===
| Year | Election | Date | Elected | | | | Defeated | | | | Total | Plurality |
|---|---|---|---|---|---|---|---|---|---|---|---|---|
| 1928 | Primary | Sep. 4 | Merlin Hull | Republican | 15,821 | 34.99% | Gardner R. Withrow | Rep. | 13,508 | 29.87% | 45,219 | 2,313 |
| 1928 | Primary | Sep. 4 | Merlin Hull | Republican | 15,821 | 34.99% | Otto Bosshard | Rep. | 6,686 | 14.79% | 45,219 | 2,313 |
| 1928 | Primary | Sep. 4 | Merlin Hull | Republican | 15,821 | 34.99% | Lyall Wright | Rep. | 5,059 | 11.19% | 45,219 | 2,313 |
| 1928 | Primary | Sep. 4 | Merlin Hull | Republican | 15,821 | 34.99% | A. E. Frederick | Rep. | 4,145 | 9.17% | 45,219 | 2,313 |
| 1930 | Primary | Sep. 16 | Gardner R. Withrow | Republican | 28,602 | 52.02% | Merlin Hull (inc) | Rep. | 26,370 | 47.96% | 54,979 | 2,232 |
| 1930 | General | Sep. 16 | Gardner R. Withrow | Republican | 31,530 | 82.28% | Merlin Hull (inc-write in) | Rep. | 5,606 | 14.63% | 38,322 | 25,924 |
| 1930 | General | Sep. 16 | Gardner R. Withrow | Republican | 31,530 | 82.28% | Oliver Needham | Proh. | 1,178 | 3.07% | 38,322 | 25,924 |

=== U.S. House, Wisconsin 3rd district (1932–1942) ===
| Year | Election | Date | Elected | | | | Defeated | | | | Total | Plurality |
|---|---|---|---|---|---|---|---|---|---|---|---|---|
| 1932 | Primary | Sep. 20 | Gardner R. Withrow | Republican | 42,453 | 57.61% | Charles A. Dittman | Rep. | 31,230 | 42.38% | 73,688 | 11,223 |
| 1932 | General | Nov. 8 | Gardner R. Withrow | Republican | 59,535 | 60.64% | John J. Boyle | Dem. | 38,646 | 39.36% | 98,181 | 20,889 |
| 1934 | Primary | Sep. 18 | Gardner R. Withrow (inc) | Progressive | 17,100 | 81.44% | Otto F. Christenson | Prog. | 3,892 | 18.54% | 20,996 | 13,208 |
| 1934 | General | Nov. 8 | Gardner R. Withrow (inc) | Progressive | 47,311 | 52.08% | Levi H. Bancroft | Rep. | 25,851 | 28.46% | 90,841 | 21,460 |
| 1934 | General | Nov. 8 | Gardner R. Withrow (inc) | Progressive | 47,311 | 52.08% | Bart E. McGonigle | Dem. | 17,222 | 18.96% | 90,841 | 21,460 |
| 1934 | General | Nov. 8 | Gardner R. Withrow (inc) | Progressive | 47,311 | 52.08% | Frank Driefke | Soc. | 452 | 0.50% | 90,841 | 21,460 |
| 1936 | General | Nov. 3 | Gardner R. Withrow (inc) | Progressive | 56,141 | 51.15% | J. Charles Pile | Rep. | 38,698 | 35.26% | 109,762 | 17,443 |
| 1936 | General | Nov. 3 | Gardner R. Withrow (inc) | Progressive | 56,141 | 51.15% | Bart E. McGonigle | Dem. | 14,920 | 13.59% | 109,762 | 17,443 |
| 1938 | General | Nov. 8 | Harry W. Griswold | Republican | 43,495 | 50.06% | Gardner R. Withrow (inc) | Prog. | 36,509 | 42.02% | 86,891 | 6,986 |
| 1938 | General | Nov. 8 | Harry W. Griswold | Republican | 43,495 | 50.06% | Bart E. McGonigle | Dem. | 6,887 | 7.93% | 86,891 | 6,986 |
| 1940 | Primary | Sep. 17 | Gardner R. Withrow | Progressive | 11,810 | 87.75% | Charles D. Rosa | Prog. | 1,649 | 12.25% | 13,459 | 10,161 |
| 1940 | General | Nov. 5 | William H. Stevenson | Republican | 54,457 | 45.99% | Gardner R. Withrow | Prog. | 52,131 | 44.03% | 118,399 | 2,326 |
| 1940 | General | Nov. 5 | William H. Stevenson | Republican | 54,457 | 45.99% | George T. Doherty | Dem. | 11,806 | 9.97% | 118,399 | 2,326 |
| 1942 | General | Nov. 3 | William H. Stevenson (inc) | Republican | 34,177 | 46.87% | Gardner R. Withrow | Prog. | 31,092 | 42.64% | 72,917 | 3,085 |
| 1942 | General | Nov. 3 | William H. Stevenson (inc) | Republican | 34,177 | 46.87% | William D. Carroll | Dem. | 7,385 | 10.13% | 72,917 | 3,085 |
| 1942 | General | Nov. 3 | William H. Stevenson (inc) | Republican | 34,177 | 46.87% | Henry A. Ochsner | Soc. | 258 | 0.35% | 72,917 | 3,085 |

=== U.S. House, Wisconsin 3rd district (1948–1958) ===
| Year | Election | Date | Elected | | | | Defeated | | | | Total | Plurality |
|---|---|---|---|---|---|---|---|---|---|---|---|---|
| 1948 | Primary | Sep. 21 | Gardner R. Withrow | Republican | 20,099 | 41.04% | William H. Stevenson (inc) | Rep. | 18,716 | 38.22% | 48,970 | 1,383 |
| 1948 | Primary | Sep. 21 | Gardner R. Withrow | Republican | 20,099 | 41.04% | Carl Neprud | Rep. | 10,155 | 20.74% | 48,970 | 1,383 |
| 1948 | General | Nov. 2 | Gardner R. Withrow | Republican | 69,727 | 69.17% | Frank J. Antoine | Dem. | 30,650 | 30.40% | 100,809 | 39,077 |
| 1948 | General | Nov. 2 | Gardner R. Withrow | Republican | 69,727 | 69.17% | Clarence J. Habelman | Soc. | 411 | 0.41% | 100,809 | 39,077 |
| 1950 | Primary | Sep. 19 | Gardner R. Withrow (inc) | Republican | 15,847 | 35.72% | Foster B. Porter | Rep. | 14,968 | 33.74% | 44,365 | 879 |
| 1950 | Primary | Sep. 19 | Gardner R. Withrow (inc) | Republican | 15,847 | 35.72% | Joseph F. Walsh | Rep. | 13,550 | 30.54% | 44,365 | 879 |
| 1950 | General | Nov. 7 | Gardner R. Withrow (inc) | Republican | 54,783 | 58.76% | Patrick Lucey | Dem. | 38,265 | 41.04% | 93,237 | 16,518 |
| 1950 | General | Nov. 7 | Gardner R. Withrow (inc) | Republican | 54,783 | 58.76% | Walter Alexander | Soc. | 180 | 0.19% | 93,237 | 16,518 |
| 1952 | Primary | Sep. 9 | Gardner R. Withrow (inc) | Republican | 32,062 | 51.33% | William H. Stevenson | Rep. | 30,404 | 48.67% | 62,466 | 1,658 |
| 1952 | General | Nov. 4 | Gardner R. Withrow (inc) | Republican | 96,908 | 75.07% | Edna Brown | Dem. | 32,165 | 24.92% | 129,085 | 64,743 |
| 1954 | Primary | Sep. 14 | Gardner R. Withrow (inc) | Republican | 20,108 | 47.28% | John Bosshard | Rep. | 15,466 | 36.36% | 42,532 | 4,642 |
| 1954 | Primary | Sep. 14 | Gardner R. Withrow (inc) | Republican | 20,108 | 47.28% | Arthur O. Mockrud | Rep. | 6,958 | 16.36% | 42,532 | 4,642 |
| 1954 | General | Nov. 2 | Gardner R. Withrow (inc) | Republican | 56,228 | 62.05% | Joseph A. Seep | Dem. | 34,375 | 37.94% | 90,615 | 21,853 |
| 1956 | General | Nov. 6 | Gardner R. Withrow (inc) | Republican | 74,000 | 61.20% | Norman Clapp | Dem. | 46,911 | 38.80% | 120,914 | 27,089 |
| 1958 | General | Nov. 4 | Gardner R. Withrow (inc) | Republican | 47,858 | 51.20% | Norman Clapp | Dem. | 45,608 | 48.80% | 93,467 | 2,250 |

Wisconsin State Assembly
| Preceded by James D. H. Peterson | Member of the Wisconsin State Assembly from the La Crosse 1st district January 3, 1927 – January 7, 1929 | Succeeded by John Mulder |
U.S. House of Representatives
| Preceded by Merlin Hull | Member of the U.S. House of Representatives from Wisconsin's 7th congressional district 1931-1933 | Succeeded by Gerald J. Boileau |
| Preceded by John M. Nelson | Member of the U.S. House of Representatives from Wisconsin's 3rd congressional district 1933-1939 | Succeeded by Harry W. Griswold |
| Preceded by William H. Stevenson | Member of the U.S. House of Representatives from Wisconsin's 3rd congressional district 1949-1961 | Succeeded by Vernon Wallace Thomson |
