= Wisconsin's 32nd Senate district =

American legislative district in western Wisconsin

Wisconsin's 32nd State Senate district
- 2024 map defined in 2023 Wisc. Act 94; 2022 map defined in Johnson v. Wisconsin Elections Commission; 2011 map was defined in 2011 Wisc. Act 43 composed of Assembly districts 94, 95, and 96
Senator
Brad Pfaff; D–Onalaska
since January 4, 2021 (5 years, 253 days)
- Demographics: 90.66% White; 1.78% Black; 2.44% Hispanic; 3.22% Asian; 1.31% Native American; 0.1% Hawaiian/Pacific Islander
- Population (2020) • Voting age: 178,485; 139,517
- Website: Official website
- Notes: Western Wisconsin

Wisconsin's 32nd Senate district is one of 33 districts in the Wisconsin Senate. Located in western Wisconsin, the district comprises all of La Crosse County and nearly all of Vernon County, along with parts of southwest Monroe County and southeast Trempealeau County. It includes the cities of La Crosse, Onalaska, Sparta, and Viroqua.

== Current elected officials ==
Brad Pfaff is the current senator representing the 32nd district. He was elected in the 2020 general election. Before his election as senator, he served nearly two years as Acting Secretary of the Wisconsin Department of Agriculture, Trade and Consumer Protection.

Each Wisconsin State Senate district is composed of three Wisconsin State Assembly districts. The 32nd Senate district comprises the 94th, 95th, and 96th Assembly districts. The current representatives of those districts are:

- Assembly District 94: Steve Doyle (D–Onalaska)
- Assembly District 95: Jill Billings (D–La Crosse)
- Assembly District 96: Tara Johnson (D–Shelby)

The district is located entirely within Wisconsin's 3rd congressional district, which is represented by U.S. Representative Derrick Van Orden.

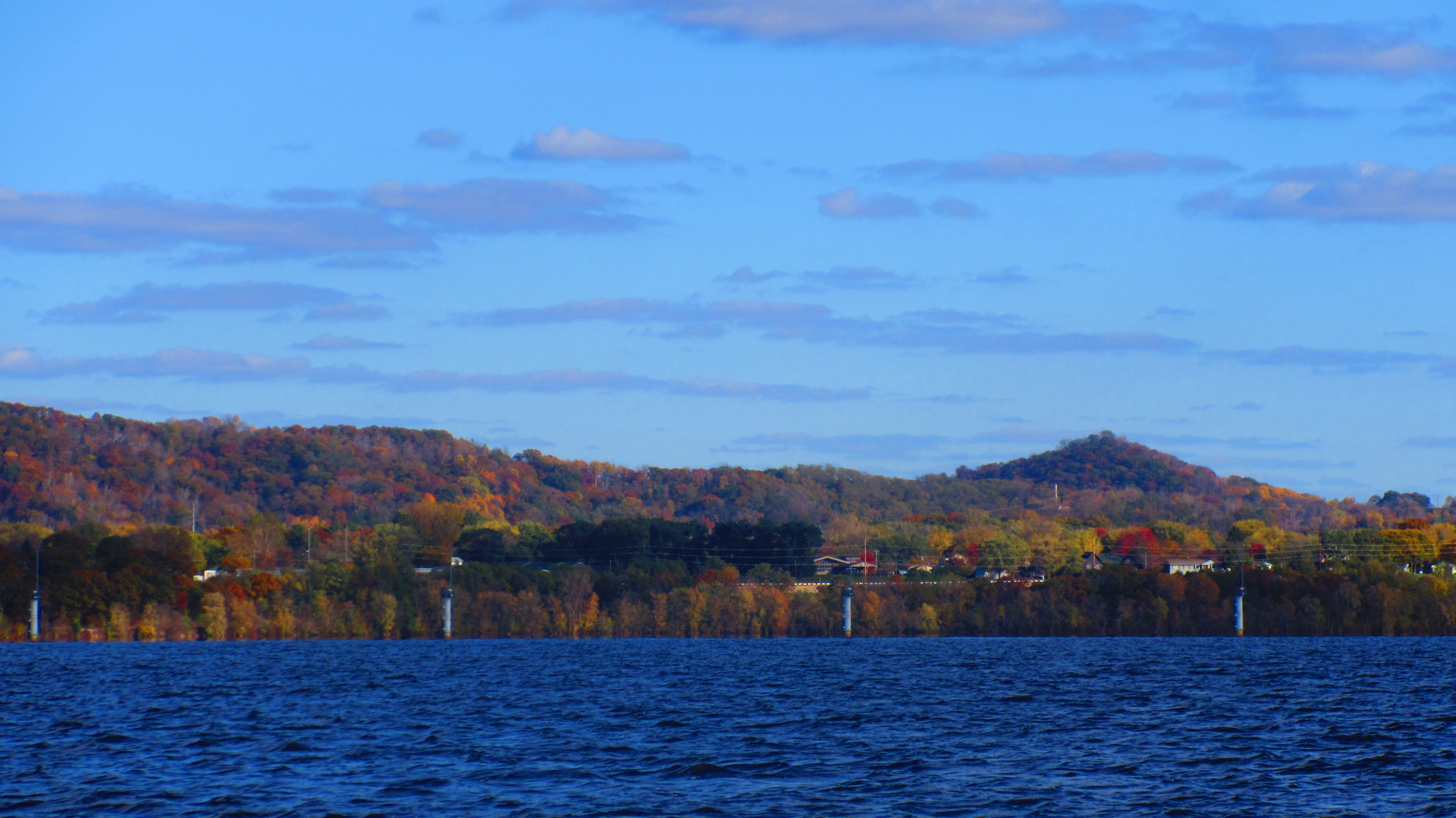
Onalaska viewed from Lake Onalaska

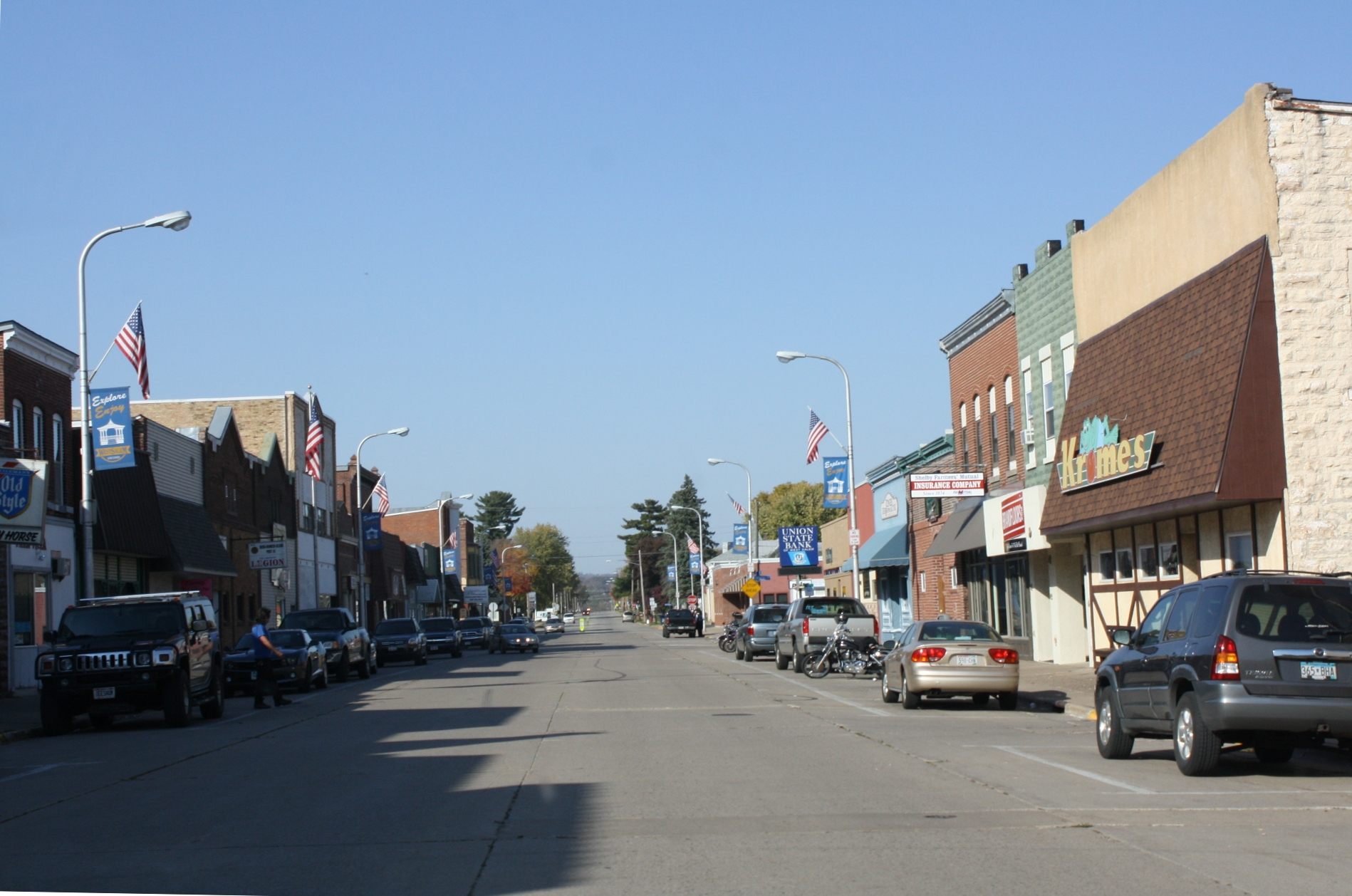
Village of West Salem

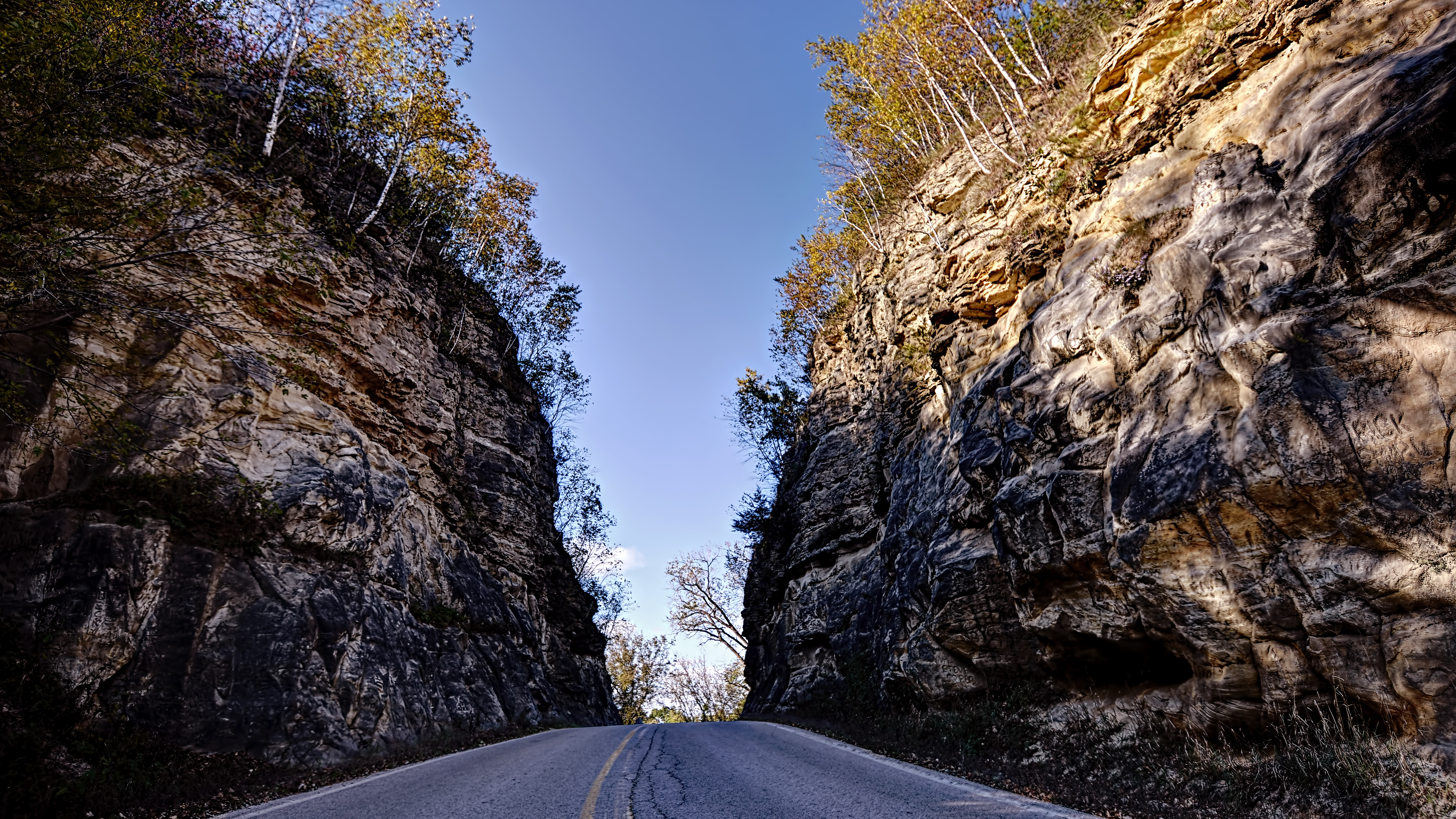
The Mindoro Cut in the town of Hamilton

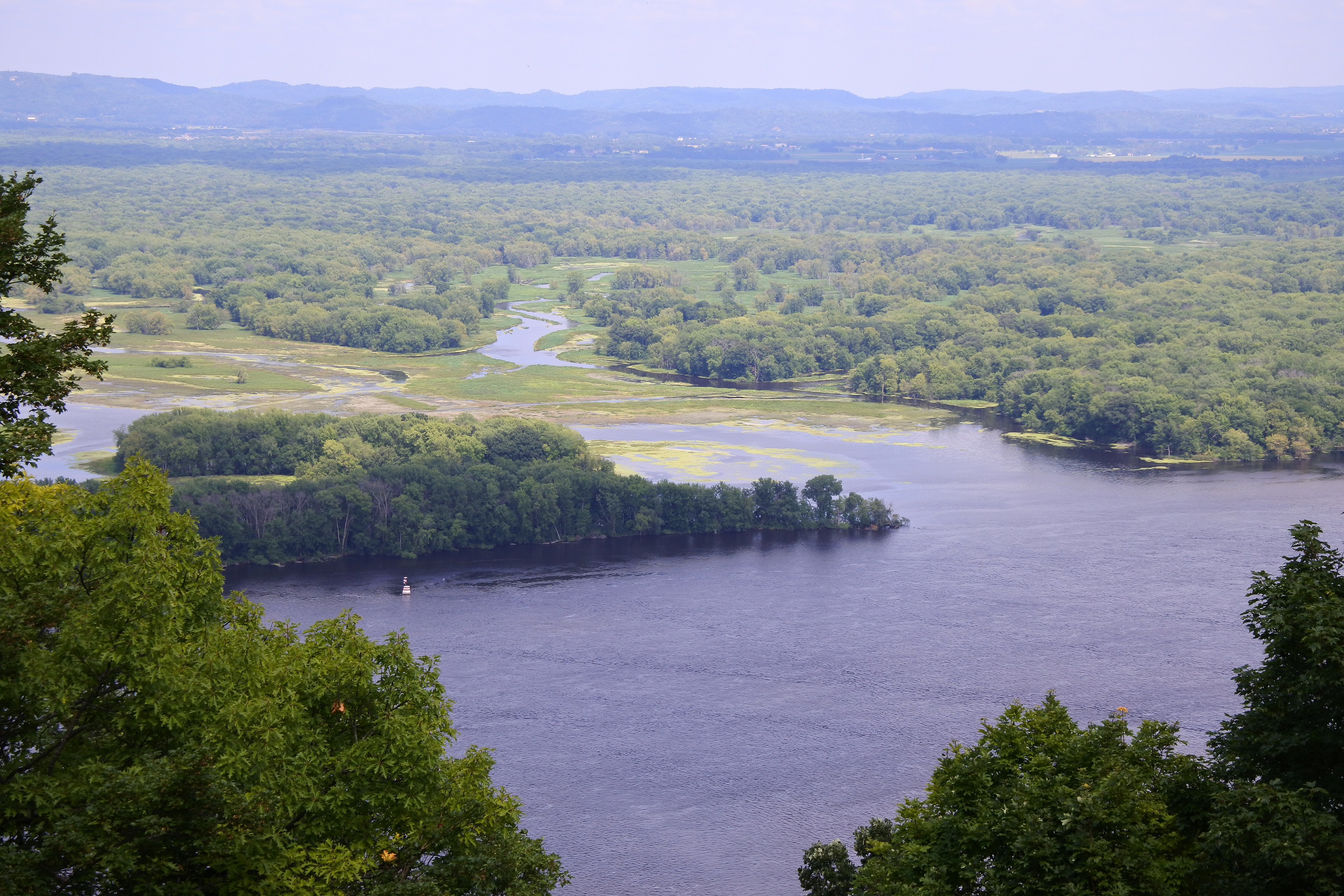
Black River delta

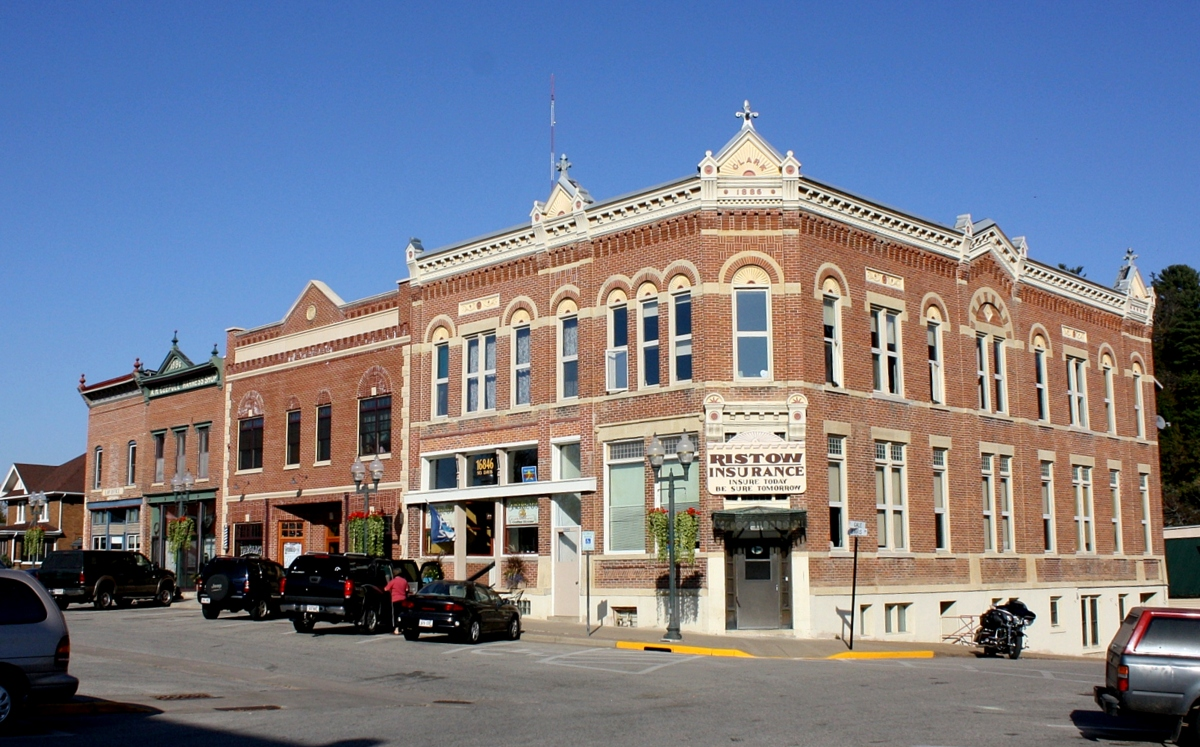
Downtown Historic District in Galesville

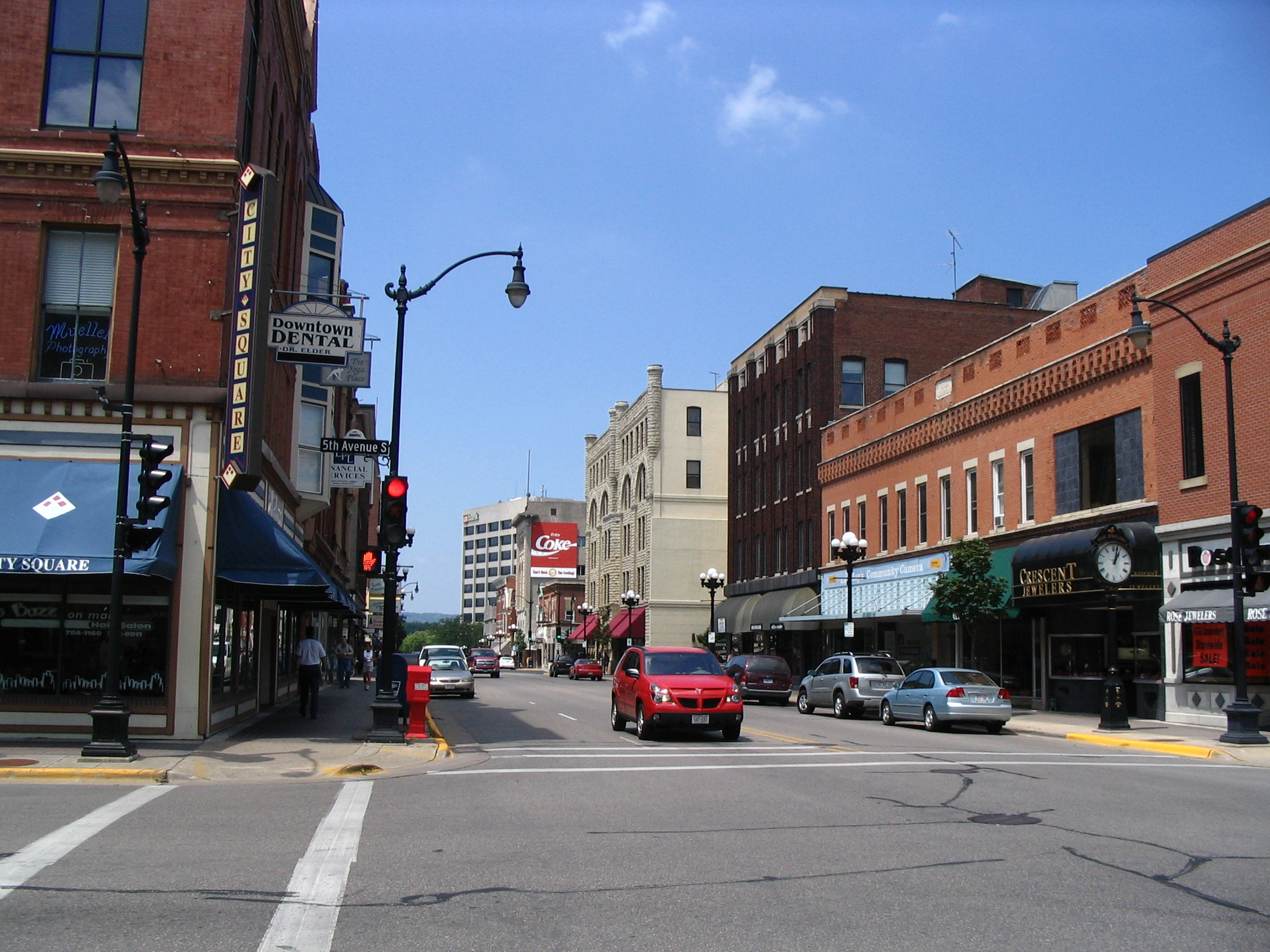
La Crosse Commercial Historic District

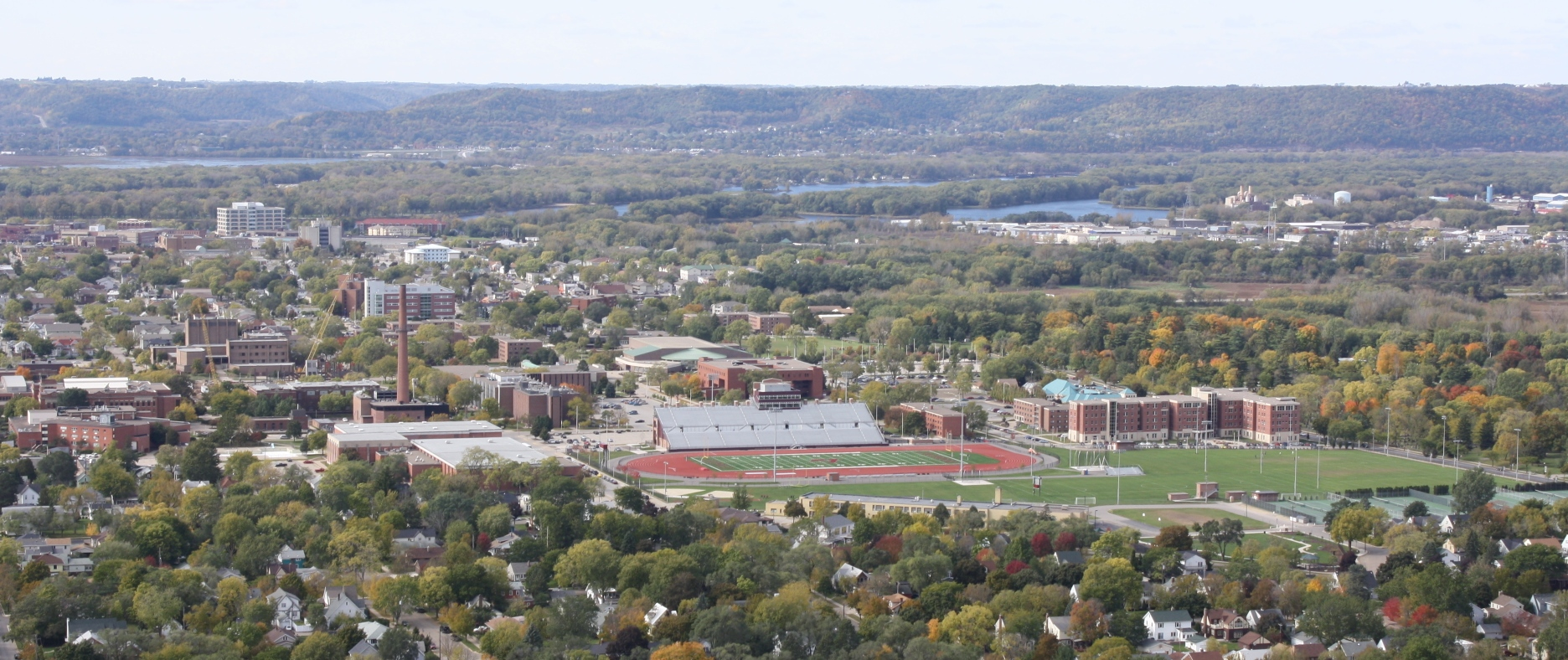
University of Wisconsin–La Crosse viewed from Grandad Bluff

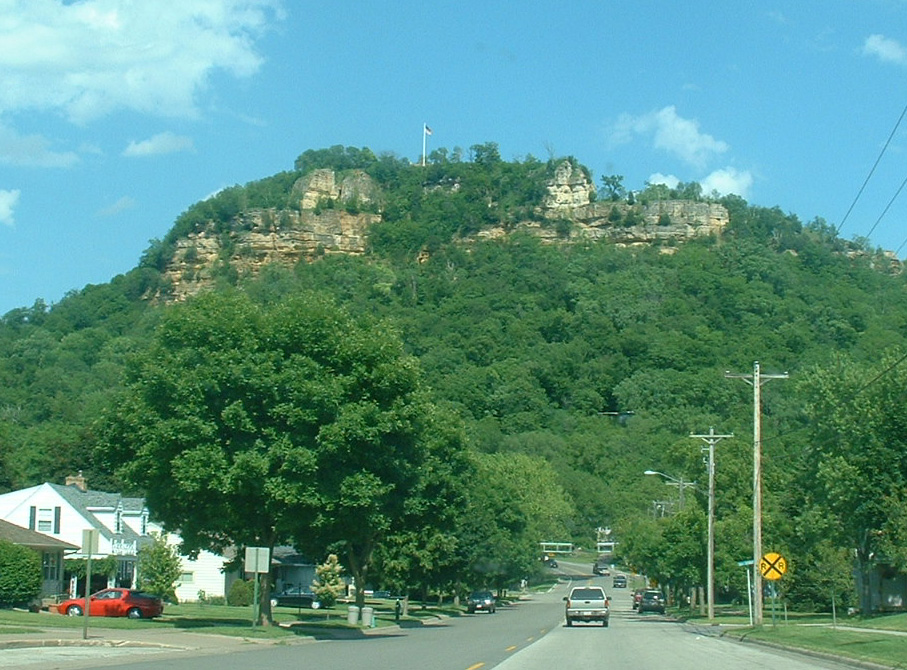
Grandad Bluff

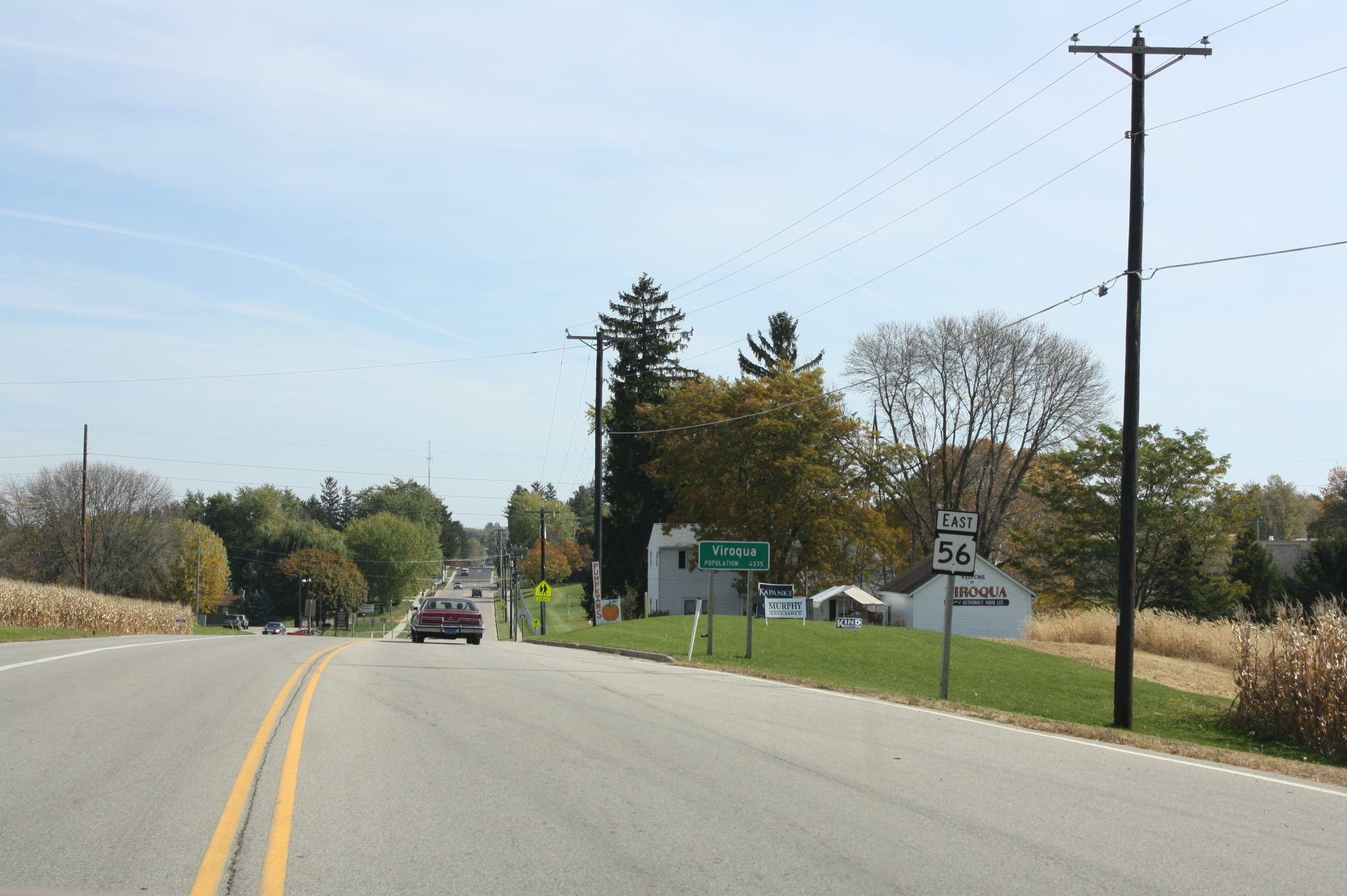
Entering Viroqua on Wisconsin Highway 56

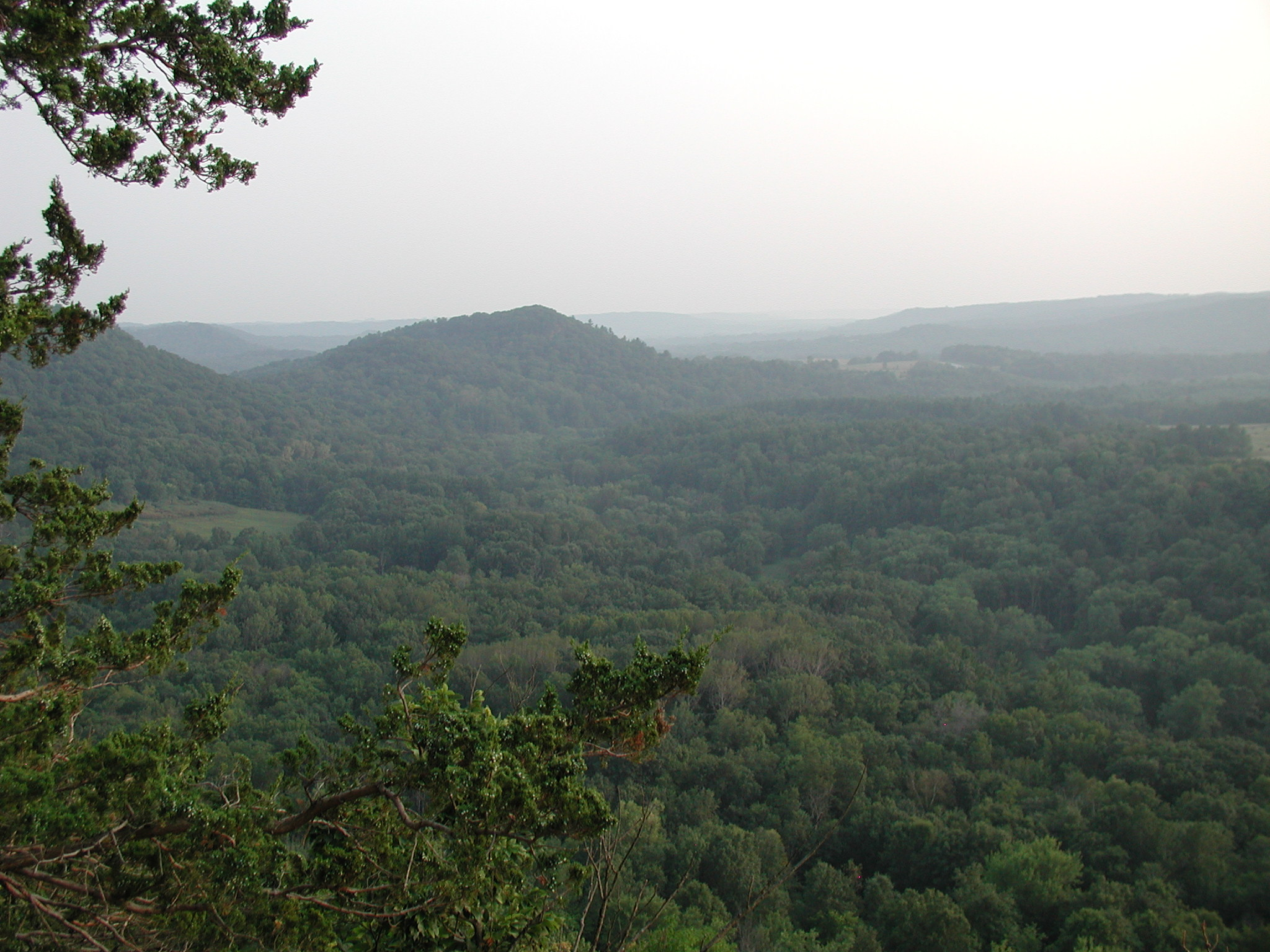
Wildcat Mountain State Park

== History ==
The 32nd district was created in 1861 after the 1860 United States census, when the State Senate was expanded from 30 to 33 members. The first to represent the district was M. D. Bartlett, a Republican from Durand who served in the 1862 and 1863 sessions. At that time, the district consisted of Buffalo, Chippewa, Clark, Dunn, Eau Claire, Jackson, Pepin and Trempealeau Counties.

== Past senators ==
The district has been represented by:

Note: The boundaries of districts have changed over history. Previous politicians of a specific numbered district will have represented a different geographic area, due to redistricting.

Senator	Party	Notes	Session	Years	District definition
District created by 1861 Wisc. Act 216.				1861	Buffalo, Chippewa, Clark, Dunn, Eau Claire, Jackson, Pepin, and Trempealeau counties
M. D. Bartlett	Rep.		15th	1862	Buffalo, Chippewa, Clark, Dunn, Eau Claire, Jackson, Pepin, and Trempealeau counties
M. D. Bartlett	Rep.		16th	1863	Buffalo, Chippewa, Clark, Dunn, Eau Claire, Jackson, Pepin, and Trempealeau counties
Carl C. Pope	Natl. Union		17th	1864	Buffalo, Chippewa, Clark, Dunn, Eau Claire, Jackson, Pepin, and Trempealeau counties
Carl C. Pope	Natl. Union		18th	1865	Buffalo, Chippewa, Clark, Dunn, Eau Claire, Jackson, Pepin, and Trempealeau counties
Joseph G. Thorp	Natl. Union		19th	1866	Buffalo, Chippewa, Clark, Dunn, Eau Claire, Jackson, Pepin, and Trempealeau counties
Joseph G. Thorp	Natl. Union		20th	1867	Buffalo, Chippewa, Clark, Dunn, Eau Claire, Jackson, Pepin, and Trempealeau counties
Alfred W. Newman	Rep.		21st	1868	Buffalo, Chippewa, Clark, Dunn, Eau Claire, Jackson, Pepin, and Trempealeau counties
Alfred W. Newman	Rep.		22nd	1869	Buffalo, Chippewa, Clark, Dunn, Eau Claire, Jackson, Pepin, and Trempealeau counties
William T. Price	Rep.		23rd	1870	Buffalo, Chippewa, Clark, Dunn, Eau Claire, Jackson, Pepin, and Trempealeau counties
William T. Price	Rep.		24th	1871	Buffalo, Chippewa, Clark, Dunn, Eau Claire, Jackson, Pepin, and Trempealeau counties
Orlando Brown	Rep.		25th	1872	Buffalo, Clark, Jackson, and Trempealeau counties 1870 population: 32,992
Orlando Brown	Rep.		26th	1873	Buffalo, Clark, Jackson, and Trempealeau counties 1870 population: 32,992
Robert C. Field	Rep.		27th	1874	Buffalo, Clark, Jackson, and Trempealeau counties 1870 population: 32,992
Robert C. Field	Rep.		28th	1875	Buffalo, Clark, Jackson, and Trempealeau counties 1870 population: 32,992
Mark Douglas	Rep.		29th	1876	Buffalo, Clark, Jackson, and Trempealeau counties 1870 population: 32,992
Mark Douglas	Rep.		30th	1877	Jackson and Monroe counties 1875 population: 32,365; 1880 population: 34,891
William T. Price	Rep.		31st	1878	Jackson and Monroe counties 1875 population: 32,365; 1880 population: 34,891
William T. Price	Rep.		32nd	1879	Jackson and Monroe counties 1875 population: 32,365; 1880 population: 34,891
William T. Price	Rep.		33rd	1880	Jackson and Monroe counties 1875 population: 32,365; 1880 population: 34,891
William T. Price	Rep.		34th	1881	Jackson and Monroe counties 1875 population: 32,365; 1880 population: 34,891
Charles K. Erwin	Rep.		35th	1882	Jackson and Monroe counties 1875 population: 32,365; 1880 population: 34,891
Charles K. Erwin	Rep.		36th	1883–1884	Jackson and Monroe counties 1875 population: 32,365; 1880 population: 34,891
Charles K. Erwin	Rep.		37th	1885–1886	Jackson and Monroe counties 1875 population: 32,365; 1880 population: 34,891
Charles K. Erwin	Rep.		38th	1887–1888	Jackson and Monroe counties 1875 population: 32,365; 1880 population: 34,891
Hugh H. Price	Rep.		39th	1889–1890	Jackson, Monroe, and Wood counties 1885 population: 53,809
Hugh H. Price	Rep.		40th	1891–1892	Jackson, Monroe, and Wood counties 1885 population: 53,809
Levi Withee	Rep.		41st	1893–1894	La Crosse and Trempealeau counties 1890 population: 57,721; 1895 population: 65,573; 1900 population: 66,111; 1910 population: 66,924
Levi Withee	Rep.		42nd	1895–1896	La Crosse and Trempealeau counties 1890 population: 57,721; 1895 population: 65,573; 1900 population: 66,111; 1910 population: 66,924
Levi Withee	Rep.		43rd	1897–1898	La Crosse and Trempealeau counties 1890 population: 57,721; 1895 population: 65,573; 1900 population: 66,111; 1910 population: 66,924
Levi Withee	Rep.		44th	1899–1900	La Crosse and Trempealeau counties 1890 population: 57,721; 1895 population: 65,573; 1900 population: 66,111; 1910 population: 66,924
John C. Gaveney	Rep.		45th	1901–1902	La Crosse and Trempealeau counties 1890 population: 57,721; 1895 population: 65,573; 1900 population: 66,111; 1910 population: 66,924
John C. Gaveney	Rep.		46th	1903–1904	La Crosse and Trempealeau counties 1890 population: 57,721; 1895 population: 65,573; 1900 population: 66,111; 1910 population: 66,924
Thomas Morris	Rep.	Resigned 1910 after elected Lieutenant Governor of Wisconsin.	47th	1905–1906	La Crosse and Trempealeau counties 1890 population: 57,721; 1895 population: 65,573; 1900 population: 66,111; 1910 population: 66,924
Thomas Morris	Rep.	Resigned 1910 after elected Lieutenant Governor of Wisconsin.	48th	1907–1908	La Crosse and Trempealeau counties 1890 population: 57,721; 1895 population: 65,573; 1900 population: 66,111; 1910 population: 66,924
Thomas Morris	Rep.	Resigned 1910 after elected Lieutenant Governor of Wisconsin.	49th	1909–1910	La Crosse and Trempealeau counties 1890 population: 57,721; 1895 population: 65,573; 1900 population: 66,111; 1910 population: 66,924
Otto Bosshard	Rep.	Won 1910 special election.	50th	1911–1912	La Crosse and Trempealeau counties 1890 population: 57,721; 1895 population: 65,573; 1900 population: 66,111; 1910 population: 66,924
Otto Bosshard	Rep.	Won 1910 special election.	51st	1913–1914	La Crosse and Trempealeau counties 1890 population: 57,721; 1895 population: 65,573; 1900 population: 66,111; 1910 population: 66,924
Otto Bosshard	Rep.	Won 1910 special election.	52nd	1915–1916	La Crosse and Trempealeau counties 1890 population: 57,721; 1895 population: 65,573; 1900 population: 66,111; 1910 population: 66,924
Eugene F. Clark	Rep.		53rd	1917–1918	La Crosse and Trempealeau counties 1890 population: 57,721; 1895 population: 65,573; 1900 population: 66,111; 1910 population: 66,924
Eugene F. Clark	Rep.		54th	1919–1920	La Crosse and Trempealeau counties 1890 population: 57,721; 1895 population: 65,573; 1900 population: 66,111; 1910 population: 66,924
Eugene F. Clark	Rep.		55th	1921–1922	La Crosse and Trempealeau counties 1890 population: 57,721; 1895 population: 65,573; 1900 population: 66,111; 1910 population: 66,924
Eugene F. Clark	Rep.		56th	1923–1924	Jackson, La Crosse, and Trempealeau counties
Valentine S. Keppel	Rep.		57th	1925–1926	Jackson, La Crosse, and Trempealeau counties
Valentine S. Keppel	Rep.		58th	1927–1928	Jackson, La Crosse, and Trempealeau counties
Valentine S. Keppel	Rep.		59th	1929–1930	Jackson, La Crosse, and Trempealeau counties
Valentine S. Keppel	Rep.		60th	1931–1932	Jackson, La Crosse, and Trempealeau counties
Harry W. Griswold	Rep.		61st	1933–1934	Jackson, La Crosse, and Trempealeau counties
Harry W. Griswold	Rep.		62nd	1935–1936	Jackson, La Crosse, and Trempealeau counties
Oscar S. Paulson	Prog.		63rd	1937–1938	Jackson, La Crosse, and Trempealeau counties
Oscar S. Paulson	Prog.		64th	1939–1940	Jackson, La Crosse, and Trempealeau counties
Rudolph Schlabach	Rep.	Resigned Feb. 1953, appointed to Wisconsin Tax Appeals Commission.	65th	1941–1942	Jackson, La Crosse, and Trempealeau counties
Rudolph Schlabach	Rep.	Resigned Feb. 1953, appointed to Wisconsin Tax Appeals Commission.	66th	1943–1944	Jackson, La Crosse, and Trempealeau counties
Rudolph Schlabach	Rep.	Resigned Feb. 1953, appointed to Wisconsin Tax Appeals Commission.	67th	1945–1946	Jackson, La Crosse, and Trempealeau counties
Rudolph Schlabach	Rep.	Resigned Feb. 1953, appointed to Wisconsin Tax Appeals Commission.	68th	1947–1948	Jackson, La Crosse, and Trempealeau counties
Rudolph Schlabach	Rep.	Resigned Feb. 1953, appointed to Wisconsin Tax Appeals Commission.	69th	1949–1950	Jackson, La Crosse, and Trempealeau counties
Rudolph Schlabach	Rep.	Resigned Feb. 1953, appointed to Wisconsin Tax Appeals Commission.	70th	1951–1952	Jackson, La Crosse, and Trempealeau counties
Rudolph Schlabach	Rep.	Resigned Feb. 1953, appointed to Wisconsin Tax Appeals Commission.	71st	1953–1954	Jackson, La Crosse, and Trempealeau counties
--Vacant--			71st	1953–1954	Jackson, La Crosse, and Trempealeau counties
Raymond Bice Sr.	Rep.		71st	1953–1954	Jackson, La Crosse, and Trempealeau counties
Raymond Bice Sr.	Rep.		72nd	1955–1956	Jackson, La Crosse, and Trempealeau counties
Raymond Bice Sr.	Rep.		73rd	1957–1958	Jackson, La Crosse, and Trempealeau counties
Raymond Bice Sr.	Rep.		74th	1959–1960	Jackson, La Crosse, and Trempealeau counties
Raymond Bice Sr.	Rep.		75th	1961–1962	Jackson, La Crosse, and Trempealeau counties
Raymond Bice Sr.	Rep.		76th	1963–1964	Jackson, La Crosse, and Trempealeau counties
Raymond Bice Sr.	Rep.		77th	1965–1966	Crawford, Vernon, and La Crosse counties
Raymond Bice Sr.	Rep.		78th	1967–1968	Crawford, Vernon, and La Crosse counties
Milo Knutson	Rep.		79th	1969–1970	Crawford, Vernon, and La Crosse counties
Milo Knutson	Rep.		80th	1971–1972	Crawford, Vernon, and La Crosse counties
Milo Knutson	Rep.		81st	1973–1974	Crawford, Vernon, and La Crosse counties and Northwest Grant County; Southeast Trempealeau County; Southwest Jackson County; Part of Monroe County
Milo Knutson	Rep.		82nd	1975–1976	Crawford, Vernon, and La Crosse counties and Northwest Grant County; Southeast Trempealeau County; Southwest Jackson County; Part of Monroe County
Paul Offner	Dem.	Resigned Feb. 1984.	83rd	1977–1978	Crawford, Vernon, and La Crosse counties and Northwest Grant County; Southeast Trempealeau County; Southwest Jackson County; Part of Monroe County
Paul Offner	Dem.	Resigned Feb. 1984.	84th	1979–1980	Crawford, Vernon, and La Crosse counties and Northwest Grant County; Southeast Trempealeau County; Southwest Jackson County; Part of Monroe County
Paul Offner	Dem.	Resigned Feb. 1984.	85th	1981–1982	Crawford, Vernon, and La Crosse counties and Northwest Grant County; Southeast Trempealeau County; Southwest Jackson County; Part of Monroe County
Paul Offner	Dem.	Resigned Feb. 1984.	86th	1983–1984	
--Vacant--			86th	1983–1984	
Brian Rude	Rep.	Won 1984 special election.	86th	1983–1984	
Brian Rude	Rep.	Won 1984 special election.	87th	1985–1986	Crawford, Vernon, and La Crosse counties and Northern Grant County; Southwest Monroe County
Brian Rude	Rep.	Won 1984 special election.	88th	1987–1988	Crawford, Vernon, and La Crosse counties and Northern Grant County; Southwest Monroe County
Brian Rude	Rep.	Won 1984 special election.	89th	1989–1990	Crawford, Vernon, and La Crosse counties and Northern Grant County; Southwest Monroe County
Brian Rude	Rep.	Won 1984 special election.	90th	1991–1992	Crawford, Vernon, and La Crosse counties and Northern Grant County; Southwest Monroe County
Brian Rude	Rep.	Won 1984 special election.	91st	1993–1994	Crawford, Vernon, and La Crosse counties and Most of Richland County; Part of Monroe County
Brian Rude	Rep.	Won 1984 special election.	92nd	1995–1996	Crawford, Vernon, and La Crosse counties and Most of Richland County; Part of Monroe County
Brian Rude	Rep.	Won 1984 special election.	93rd	1997–1998	Crawford, Vernon, and La Crosse counties and Most of Richland County; Part of Monroe County
Brian Rude	Rep.	Won 1984 special election.	94th	1999–2000	Crawford, Vernon, and La Crosse counties and Most of Richland County; Part of Monroe County
Mark Meyer	Dem.		95th	2001–2002	Crawford, Vernon, and La Crosse counties and Most of Richland County; Part of Monroe County
Mark Meyer	Dem.		96th	2003–2004	Crawford, Vernon, and La Crosse counties and Northwest Richland County; Southern Monroe County
Dan Kapanke	Rep.	Lost 2011 recall election.	97th	2005–2006	Crawford, Vernon, and La Crosse counties and Northwest Richland County; Southern Monroe County
Dan Kapanke	Rep.	Lost 2011 recall election.	98th	2007–2008	Crawford, Vernon, and La Crosse counties and Northwest Richland County; Southern Monroe County
Dan Kapanke	Rep.	Lost 2011 recall election.	99th	2009–2010	Crawford, Vernon, and La Crosse counties and Northwest Richland County; Southern Monroe County
Dan Kapanke	Rep.	Lost 2011 recall election.	100th	2011–2012	Crawford, Vernon, and La Crosse counties and Northwest Richland County; Southern Monroe County
Jennifer Shilling	Dem.	Won 2011 recall election. Resigned May 2020.	100th	2011–2012	Crawford, Vernon, and La Crosse counties and Northwest Richland County; Southern Monroe County
Jennifer Shilling	Dem.	Won 2011 recall election. Resigned May 2020.	101st	2013–2014	Crawford and La Crosse counties and Most of Vernon County; Southern Monroe County
Jennifer Shilling	Dem.	Won 2011 recall election. Resigned May 2020.	102nd	2015–2016	Crawford and La Crosse counties and Most of Vernon County; Southern Monroe County
Jennifer Shilling	Dem.	Won 2011 recall election. Resigned May 2020.	103rd	2017–2018	Crawford and La Crosse counties and Most of Vernon County; Southern Monroe County
Jennifer Shilling	Dem.	Won 2011 recall election. Resigned May 2020.	104th	2019–2020	Crawford and La Crosse counties and Most of Vernon County; Southern Monroe County
--Vacant--			104th	2019–2020	Crawford and La Crosse counties and Most of Vernon County; Southern Monroe County
Brad Pfaff	Dem.		105th	2021–2022	Crawford and La Crosse counties and Most of Vernon County; Southern Monroe County
Brad Pfaff	Dem.		106th	2023–2024	Crawford County, most of La Crosse County, most of Vernon County, southern Monroe County
Brad Pfaff	Dem.		107th	2025–2026	La Crosse County, most of Vernon County, southwestern Monroe County, southeastern Trempealeau County

== Electoral history ==
Year	Election	Date	Elected				Defeated				Total	Plurality	Other primary candidates
1984 special	Special	Apr. 3	Brian D. Rude (inc)	Republican	20,037	50.44%	John Medinger	Dem.	19,339	48.68%	39,728	698	Douglas L. Farmer (Rep.); Karl E. Krueger (Dem.); William T. Riley (Rep.)
1984 special	Special	Apr. 3	Brian D. Rude (inc)	Republican	20,037	50.44%	Suzanne T. Kuring	Lib.	352	0.89%	39,728	698	Douglas L. Farmer (Rep.); Karl E. Krueger (Dem.); William T. Riley (Rep.)
1984	General	Nov. 6	Brian D. Rude (inc)	Republican	35,331	54.19%	Virgil Roberts	Dem.	29,866	45.81%	65,197	5,465	
1988	General	Nov. 8	Brian D. Rude (inc)	Republican	45,384	72.20%	John Lindner	Dem.	17,471	27.80%	62,855	27,913	Monte L. Jackson (Dem.)
1992	General	Nov. 3	Brian D. Rude (inc)	Republican	46,778	63.89%	Diane Leslie Snyder	Dem.	26,440	36.11%	73,218	20,338	
1996	General	Nov. 5	Brian D. Rude (inc)	Republican	49,357	75.10%	David Wulf	Dem.	16,364	24.90%	65,721	32,993	
2000	General	Nov. 7	Mark Meyer	Democratic	39,865	50.96%	Dan Kapanke	Rep.	38,248	48.90%	78,223	1,617	Ray Babb (Rep.); Mark Johnsrud (Rep.); Ryan Olson (Rep.); John Sarnowski (Rep.)
2004	General	Nov. 3	Dan Kapanke	Republican	46,416	52.46%	Brad Pfaff	Dem.	41,928	47.39%	88,483	4,488	Monte L. Jackson (Dem.)
2008	General	Nov. 4	Dan Kapanke (inc)	Republican	45,154	51.38%	Tara Johnson	Dem.	42,647	48.53%	87,881	2,507	
2011	Recall	Aug. 9	Jennifer Shilling	Democratic	33,193	55.38%	Dan Kapanke (inc)	Rep.	26,724	44.58%	59,942	6,469	James D. Smith (Dem.)
2012	General	Nov. 6	Jennifer Shilling (inc)	Democratic	51,153	58.28%	Bill Feehan	Rep.	36,545	41.64%	87,769	14,608	
2016	General	Nov. 8	Jennifer Shilling (inc)	Democratic	43,585	48.86%	Dan Kapanke	Rep.	43,524	48.79%	89,206	61	James D. Smith (Dem.); John Sarnowski (Rep.)
2016	General	Nov. 8	Jennifer Shilling (inc)	Democratic	43,585	48.86%	Chip DeNure	Ind.	2,093	2.35%	89,206	61	James D. Smith (Dem.); John Sarnowski (Rep.)
2020	General	Nov. 3	Brad Pfaff	Democratic	48,877	50.26%	Dan Kapanke	Rep.	48,295	49.67%	97,239	582	Jayne Swiggum (Dem.); Paul Michael Weber (Dem.)
2024	General	Nov. 5	Brad Pfaff (inc)	Democratic	52,776	52.33%	Stacey Klein	Rep.	48,058	47.65%	100,857	4,718	
