= 1887 United States House of Representatives elections =

There were special elections in 1887 to the United States House of Representatives to the 49th United States Congress and the 50th United States Congress.

Elections are listed by date and district.

== 49th Congress ==
District	Incumbent			This race	
District	Member	Party	First elected	Results	Candidates
Wisconsin 8	William T. Price	Republican	1882	Incumbent died December 6, 1886. New member elected January 18, 1887 to finish his father's term. Republican hold.	▌ ✓ Hugh H. Price (Republican) 70.1%; ▌James Bardon (Democratic) 29.9%

== 50th Congress ==
District	Incumbent			This race	
District	Member	Party	First elected	Results	Candidates
Texas 2	John H. Reagan	Democratic	1874; 1861 (withdrew); 1882	Incumbent resigned March 4, 1887when elected U.S. senator. New member elected August 5, 1887. Democratic hold.	▌ ✓ William H. Martin (Democratic); Unopposed
Louisiana 6	Edward W. Robertson	Democratic	1876; 1882 (lost); 1886	Incumbent died August 2, 1887. New member elected November 8, 1887. Democratic hold.	▌ ✓ Samuel M. Robertson (Democratic) 72.45%; ▌John Yoist (Republican) 27.55%
New York 19	Nicholas T. Kane	Democratic	1886	Incumbent died September 14, 1887. New member elected November 8, 1887. Democratic hold.	▌ ✓ Charles Tracey (Democratic) 49.92%; ▌John M. Barley (Republican) 45.40%; ▌Patrick O'Heaney (Union Labor) 2.97%; ▌William J. Dickson (Prohibition) 1.71%
New York 25	Frank Hiscock	Republican	1876	Incumbent member-elect resigned March 3, 1887 when elected U.S. senator. New member elected November 8, 1887. Republican hold.	▌ ✓ James J. Belden (Republican) 60.04%; ▌Alexander H. Davis (Democratic) 34.60%; ▌Francis A. Sinclair (Prohibition) 5.36%
Wisconsin 8	William T. Price	Republican	1882	Incumbent member-elect died December 6, 1886. New member elected January 18, 1887. Republican hold.	▌ ✓ Nils P. Haugen (Republican) 46.3%; ▌Samuel C. Johnson (Democratic) 38.6%; ▌Peter Truax (Prohibition) 14.9%; ▌Hugh H. Price (Write-in) 0.2%

== See also ==
- 49th United States Congress
- 50th United States Congress
