= Twesme =

Twesme is a surname. Notable people with the surname include:

- Albert Twesme (1879–1949), American lawyer
- Albert L. Twesme (1914–1995), American lawyer
