= William H. Stevenson =

20th century American politician (1891–1978)

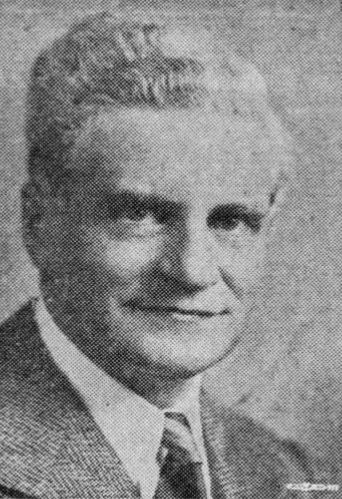
- The La Crosse Tribune, September 19, 1940

Member of the U.S. House of Representatives from Wisconsin's 3rd district
- In office January 3, 1941 – January 3, 1949
- Preceded by: Harry W. Griswold
- Succeeded by: Gardner R. Withrow

District Attorney of La Crosse County, Wisconsin
- In office January 7, 1935 – January 3, 1941
- Preceded by: Fred G. Silberschmidt
- Succeeded by: John S. Coleman

District Attorney of Richland County, Wisconsin
- In office January 1, 1925 – January 1, 1927
- Preceded by: O. D. Black
- Succeeded by: Van R. Coppernoll

Personal details
- Born: September 23, 1891 Kenosha, Wisconsin, U.S.
- Died: March 19, 1978 (aged 86) La Crosse, Wisconsin, U.S.
- Resting place: Onalaska City Cemetery, Onalaska, Wisconsin
- Party: Republican
- Spouse: Lulu Belle Bucklin (m. 1913–1978)
- Children: Phyllis Belle (Grams); (b. 1914; died 1996)
- Education: La Crosse Normal School (B.A.); University of Wisconsin School of Law (LL.B.)
- Profession: Lawyer, politician

William Henry Stevenson (September 23, 1891 – March 19, 1978) was an American lawyer and Republican politician from La Crosse County, Wisconsin. He served four terms in the U.S. House of Representatives, representing Wisconsin's 3rd congressional district from 1941 to 1949. Earlier in his career, he served as district attorney of La Crosse County (1935–1941) and Richland County, Wisconsin (1925–1927).

== Early life and education ==
William Stevenson was born in Kenosha, Wisconsin, in September 1891. (Note: The Wisconsin Blue Books give his birth year as 1893, his obituary says 1897. WW1 draft registration and grave stone say 1891, so that seems like the most likely to be correct. 1897 seems obviously incorrect since the same obituary lists him as graduating the normal school in 1912.) As a child, he moved with his family to La Crosse, Wisconsin, where he was raised and educated. He graduated from La Crosse Central High School and went on to attend La Crosse Normal School (now University of Wisconsin–La Crosse), where he graduated in 1912. While attending the normal school, he helped organize the Union Free High School in Holmen, Wisconsin, and after graduating he taught at that school for two years. He subsequently worked as principal of the high school in Neillsville, Wisconsin, from 1914 to 1916.

In 1916, Stevenson returned to school, entering the University of Wisconsin Law School. While attending law school, he taught class at Madison Central High School. He graduated from the University of Wisconsin and earned his LL.B. in 1919. He was also a member of the Phi Alpha Delta legal fraternity.

After he was admitted to the bar, Stevenson returned to La Crosse and partnered for a year with J. E. Higbee. In 1920, he moved to Richland Center, Wisconsin, and partnered with Levi H. Bancroft, effectively taking over his private practice while Bancroft served as a Wisconsin circuit court judge. During those years, Stevenson also served as a court commissioner for the circuit court in Richland County, Wisconsin. After Bancroft left office, their partnership continued for three years.

== Early political career ==
Stevenson made his first run for public office in 1924, when he was elected district attorney of Richland County, Wisconsin.

After his two-year term, Stevenson formed a new law partnership with his former high school teacher A. H. Schubert, following the death of Schubert's previous partner. Initially, Stevenson split his time between an office in Richland Center and another in La Crosse, but Stevenson eventually relocated to La Crosse.

In La Crosse, Stevenson resumed his political and civic activities. In 1932, he sought the Republican nomination for district attorney of La Crosse County, Wisconsin, challenging the incumbent Republican Rudolf M. Schlabach. The Republican primary was extremely close, with Schlabach ultimately prevailing by less than 100 votes. Schlabach went on to lose the general election to Democrat Fred G. Silberschmidt.

Two years later, Stevenson ran again. This time, Stevenson faced attorney Thomas H. Skemp, who was at the same time the head coach of the La Crosse Lagers football team. Despite Skemp's standing as a local celebrity, Stevenson prevailed in the primary by nearly a 2-to-1 margin. Earlier in 1934, the Wisconsin Progressive Party had been established, splitting from the Republican Party of Wisconsin. This resulted in a three-way race in the general election for district attorney, with the Democrats nominating the incumbent, Fred G. Silberschmidt, and the Progressives nominating Frank R. Schneider. All three candidates polled more than 5,000 votes in the general election; Stevenson won the race with 7,146. Stevenson won re-election in 1936 and 1938, defeating Frank Schneider again in both elections.

== Congress ==
Wisconsin's 3rd congressional district 1932–1963

On July 4, 1939, U.S. Representative Harry W. Griswold died of a sudden heart attack, creating a vacancy in Wisconsin's 3rd congressional district. Despite being only six months into a two-year term, no special election was called to fill the seat for the remainder of the 76th Congress. In July 1940, Stevenson announced that he would seek the Republican nomination to succeed Griswold in the 3rd congressional district for the 77th Congress. In announcing his campaign, Stevenson came out against the United States joining World War II, and endorsed the idea of a national highway system for employment and national defense purposes. In the Republican Party primary, Stevenson faced three other credible opponents, state senator Edward J. Roethe, La Crosse businessman Raymond C. Bice, and former Union Party gubernatorial candidate Joseph F. Walsh. Stevenson narrowly prevailed in the primary by a margin of just 274 votes over Roethe.

His chief opponent in the general election was the Progressive Party nominee, former U.S. representative Gardner R. Withrow, but a Democratic candidate, George T. Doherty, was also in the race. In the general election, Stevenson attacked the New Deal of the Roosevelt administration and said that Roosevelt's decision to seek a third term as president represented a danger to American democracy. He advocated new tariffs to prop up the price of milk and butter for Wisconsin farm producers. Stevenson won the general election in another relatively close race, taking 46% of the vote to Withrow's 44%.

During the first year of the 77th Congress, Stevenson continued to oppose new trade deals aimed at lowering tariff barriers. He also opposed Roosevelt's Lend-Lease act, though he supported other domestic military spending. One of his chief achievements in his congressional career occurred in these early months in office, when he secured the creation of the Badger Army Ammunition Plant for his congressional district as part of the defense build-up. The character of his first term changed dramatically with the attack on Pearl Harbor. Stevenson joined other Wisconsin Republicans indicating that they would drop any remaining isolationist positions.

Stevenson faced a primary challenge in 1942 from Joseph F. Walsh, who had also run in 1940. Walsh attacked Stevenson for his previous isolationist positions and indicated he would be a more supportive ally for Roosevelt in the war. Stevenson prevailed in another close primary, receiving 53% of the vote to Walsh's 47%. In the general election, he faced a rematch with Progressive Gardner Withrow, who reiterated criticisms of Stevenson's past isolationist positions and fully endorsed the Roosevelt platform for domestic and foreign policy. Stevenson defeated Withrow again, slightly expanding his margin from 1940.

Stevenson faced another primary challenge in 1944 from Joseph Walsh, and won another close victory. The Progressive Party ran no candidate that year, and Stevenson won a landslide in the general election. He won a fourth term in 1946, winning another competitive primary, and another landslide general election.

Stevenson ran for a fifth term in 1948. By then, the Wisconsin Progressive Party had disbanded and many of the voters and officials had chosen to return to the Republican Party. In the 1948 Republican primary, Stevenson faced his two-time Progressive rival from 1940 and 1942, Gardner Withrow. A third candidate also ran in the primary, Carl Neprud, who had recently served as a technical advisor at the Bretton Woods Conference. Stevenson faced intense criticism for voting for a deep cut in farm benefits. Withrow also reiterated old criticisms of Stevenson over his pre-Pearl Harbor isolationist positions. Withrow defeated Stevenson in a close election, taking 41% to Stevenson's 38%.

== Later years ==
After leaving office, Stevenson returned to his law practice in La Crosse. In 1952, he attempted to reclaim his seat in Congress, launching a primary challenge against Gardner Withrow. Stevenson's attempted political comeback was fueled by stalwart Republican discontent over their progressive incumbent, Withrow. In the end, Stevenson fell just short of Withrow in his last election, receiving 48.7% to Withrow's 51.3%.

Stevenson resumed his law practice, and moved to neighboring Onalaska, Wisconsin, in the late 1950s. He died at a La Crosse hospital on March 19, 1978, and was buried in Onalaska.

== Personal life and family ==
William Stevenson was a son of Major John Stevenson and his wife Minnie. John Stevenson was described as an Indian scout and friend of general Charles King.

William Stevenson married Lulu Bucklin of Onalaska in 1913. They had one daughter, Phyllis Belle, who survived them.

== Electoral history ==
=== U.S. House (1940–1948) ===
Year	Election	Date	Elected				Defeated				Total	Plurality
1940	Primary	Sep. 17	William H. Stevenson	Republican	9,217	26.63%	Edward J. Roethe	Rep.	8,943	25.83%	34,617	274
1940	Primary	Sep. 17	William H. Stevenson	Republican	9,217	26.63%	Joseph F. Walsh	Rep.	8,770	25.33%	34,617	274
1940	Primary	Sep. 17	William H. Stevenson	Republican	9,217	26.63%	Raymond C. Bice	Rep.	7,687	22.21%	34,617	274
1940	General	Nov. 5	William H. Stevenson	Republican	54,457	45.99%	Gardner R. Withrow	Prog.	52,131	44.03%	118,399	2,326
1940	General	Nov. 5	William H. Stevenson	Republican	54,457	45.99%	George T. Doherty	Dem.	11,806	9.97%	118,399	2,326
1942	Primary	Sep. 15	William H. Stevenson (inc)	Republican	16,641	52.86%	Joseph F. Walsh	Rep.	14,840	47.14%	31,481	1,801
1942	General	Nov. 3	William H. Stevenson (inc)	Republican	34,177	46.87%	Gardner R. Withrow	Prog.	31,092	42.64%	72,917	3,085
1942	General	Nov. 3	William H. Stevenson (inc)	Republican	34,177	46.87%	William D. Carroll	Dem.	7,385	10.13%	72,917	3,085
1942	General	Nov. 3	William H. Stevenson (inc)	Republican	34,177	46.87%	Henry A. Ochsner	Soc.	258	0.35%	72,917	3,085
1944	Primary	Aug. 15	William H. Stevenson (inc)	Republican	14,687	54.78%	Joseph F. Walsh	Rep.	12,125	45.22%	26,812	2,562
1944	General	Nov. 7	William H. Stevenson (inc)	Republican	74,092	69.86%	William D. Carroll	Dem.	26,978	25.44%	106,051	47,114
1944	General	Nov. 7	William H. Stevenson (inc)	Republican	74,092	69.86%	Olaf H. Johnson	Ind.	4,591	4.33%	106,051	47,114
1944	General	Nov. 7	William H. Stevenson (inc)	Republican	74,092	69.86%	Fred A. Dahir	Soc.	371	0.35%	106,051	47,114
1946	Primary	Aug. 13	William H. Stevenson (inc)	Republican	23,364	57.98%	Fred F. Miller	Rep.	16,931	42.02%	40,295	6,433
1946	General	Nov. 5	William H. Stevenson (inc)	Republican	65,177	96.07%	Walter L. Alexander	Soc.	2,633	3.88%	67,846	62,544
1948	Primary	Sep. 21	Gardner R. Withrow	Republican	20,099	41.04%	William H. Stevenson (inc)	Rep.	18,716	38.22%	48,970	1,383
1948	Primary	Sep. 21	Gardner R. Withrow	Republican	20,099	41.04%	Carl Neprud	Rep.	10,155	20.74%	48,970	1,383

=== U.S. House (1952) ===
Year	Election	Date	Elected				Defeated				Total	Plurality
1952	Primary	Sep.	Gardner R. Withrow (inc)	Republican	32,062	51.33%	William H. Stevenson	Rep.	30,404	48.67%	62,466	1,658

== See also ==
- Badger Army Ammunition Plant

== Notes ==
U.S. House of Representatives
Preceded by Harry W. Griswold	Member of the U.S. House of Representatives from Wisconsin's 3rd congressional district January 3, 1941 – January 3, 1949	Succeeded by Gardner R. Withrow
Legal offices
Preceded by O. D. Black	District Attorney of Richland County, Wisconsin; January 1, 1925 – January 1, 1927	Succeeded by Van R. Coppernoll
Preceded by Fred G. Silberschmidt	District Attorney of La Crosse County, Wisconsin; January 7, 1935 – January 3, 1941	Succeeded by John S. Coleman
