= Edward Krause =

Edward Krause may refer to:

- Moose Krause (Edward Walter Krause, 1913–1992), American college athlete and coach
- Edward C. Krause (1914–1950), American politician and businessman from Wisconsin
- Ed Krause, American attorney and 2010 candidate for the U.S. House of Representatives from North Carolina

== See also ==
- Edward Kraus (disambiguation)
