= Paul Offner =

American politician (1942–2004)

Member of the Wisconsin Senate from the 32nd district
- In office January 3, 1977 – January 7, 1985
- Preceded by: Milo Knutson
- Succeeded by: Brian Rude

Member of the Wisconsin State Assembly from the 95th district
- In office January 6, 1975 – January 3, 1977
- Preceded by: Lawrence R. Gibson
- Succeeded by: John Medinger

Personal details
- Born: August 7, 1942 Bennington, Vermont, U.S.
- Died: April 20, 2004 (aged 61) Washington, D.C., U.S.
- Cause of death: Cancer
- Resting place: Saint Agnes Cemetery, Avon, New York
- Party: Democratic
- Spouse: Molly
- Children: 1
- Parent: Richard Offner (father)
- Education: Amherst College (B.A.); Princeton University (M.P.A., Ph.D.)

Paul Offner (August 7, 1942 – April 20, 2004) was an American economist, educator, public health expert, and Democratic politician.

== Biography ==
Born in Bennington, Vermont, Offner was raised in Italy. Offner graduated from Amherst College in 1964. He received an M.P.A. from the Woodrow Wilson School of Public and International Affairs at Princeton University in 1966 and a Ph.D. in economics from Princeton University in 1970 after completing a doctoral dissertation titled "Labor force participation in the ghetto: a study of New York City poverty areas." In 1974, Offner was elected to the Wisconsin State Assembly from La Crosse, Wisconsin. Then in 1976, he was elected to the Wisconsin State Senate serving until 1984. After his legislative service, Offner worked in Ohio in public health. Then he worked for Daniel Patrick Moynihan as a legislative aide. Finally, he worked for the Washington, D.C. government, was a professor at Georgetown University, and worked at the Urban Institute.

== Works ==
- Offner, Paul (1970). Labor force participation in the ghetto: a study of New York City poverty areas. Princeton University.

Wisconsin State Assembly
Preceded by Lawrence R. Gibson	Member of the Wisconsin State Assembly from the 95th district January 6, 1975 – January 3, 1977	Succeeded by John Medinger
Wisconsin Senate
Preceded by Milo Knutson	Member of the Wisconsin Senate from the 32nd district January 3, 1977 – January 7, 1985	Succeeded by Brian Rude
