= Senator Bice =

Senator Bice may refer to:

- Raymond Bice Sr. (1896–1994), Wisconsin State Senate
- Stephanie Bice (born 1973), Oklahoma State Senate
