= M. D. Bartlett =

19th century American politician

Member of the Wisconsin Senate from the 32nd district
- In office January 6, 1862 – January 4, 1864
- Preceded by: Position established
- Succeeded by: Carl C. Pope

County Judge of Pepin County, Wisconsin
- In office January 1, 1859 – November 1861
- Preceded by: Position established
- Succeeded by: Samuel L. Plummer

Personal details
- Born: November 3, 1832 Victory, Cayuga County, New York, U.S.
- Died: October 29, 1894 (aged 61) Rochester, New York, U.S.
- Resting place: Union Hill Cemetery, Cato, New York
- Party: Republican
- Spouse: Mary Lavina Brewster (m. 1853–1894)
- Children: Jay Carlyle Bartlett^{(b. 1855; died 1911)}; Earle Brewster Bartlett^{(b. 1858; died 1944)}; Mary Belle (Rounds)^{(b. 1862; died 1943)}; Edward Lincoln Bartlett^{(b. 1864)}; Maud Evangeline Bartlett^{(b. 1867; died 1951)}; John Winthrop Bartlett^{(b. 1876)}; Guy Paul Bartlett^{(b. 1878; died 1946)}; Claire E. (Griffith)^{(b. 1880; died 1947)}
- Profession: Lawyer

John Milton Duane Bartlett Jr. (November 3, 1832 (Note: Different sources give the same month and day but different years for his birth. The History of Eau Claire County gives his birth year as 1833, The Brewster Genealogy gives it as 1831, and his gravestone says 1832. I'm inclined to go with the gravestone, but the stone also incorrectly labels his death year as 1884, when it was actually 1894, per contemporaneous news articles.) – October 29, 1894) was an American lawyer, Republican politician, and Wisconsin pioneer. He was a member of the Wisconsin Senate, representing much of northwestern Wisconsin during the 1862 and 1863 sessions. His name was often abbreviated as M. D. Bartlett.

== Biography ==
M. D. Bartlett was born in the town of Victory, Cayuga County, New York, in November 1832. He was raised in that county until age 12, when his family moved to Auburn, New York. He graduated from Albany Law School.

Shortly after graduating from law school, Bartlett moved to East Troy, Wisconsin, in Walworth County. He remained less than a year, returning to New York in October 1852. After marrying in New York, he returned to Wisconsin in 1854, this time settling in Delavan. After a year in Delavan and another year in East Troy, in the spring of 1856 he moved to what is now the town of Frankfort, Pepin County, Wisconsin, where he suspended his legal practice and began cultivating a farm. At the time this area was still part of Dunn County.

In 1858, his section of Dunn County was set off and created as the new county of Pepin. At the first election after Pepin County was organized, Bartlett was elected county judge and resumed his legal career. He served in that office for nearly three years, but resigned after his election to the Wisconsin Senate in 1861. In that 1861 election, he received the Republican nomination and was elected without opposition in the general election. He went on to represent the 32nd Senate district during the 1862 and 1863 legislative sessions.

While serving as county judge, Bartlett began residing at Durand, the county seat of Pepin County. He sold his Frankfort property sometime in the early 1860s and kept his primary residence in Durand until 1865.

After his term in the Senate, Bartlett accepted a commission from the Governor to serve as a sanitary agent monitoring the conditions of Wisconsin's volunteer regiments at camps and hospitals across the western theater of the American Civil War.

After the war, Bartlett moved to Minneapolis, but resided there for only five years, returning to Wisconsin in 1870. He resided for much of the rest of his life at Eau Claire, Wisconsin, where he continued to practice law. He died at Rochester, New York, while visiting family in October 1894.

== Personal life and family ==
M. D. Bartlett was the second of three known children of John Milton Duane Bartlett Sr. and his wife Hannah (née Earle). Bartlett's younger brother, Edward Mortimer Bartlett was also an attorney who moved to western Wisconsin, he served as lieutenant colonel in the 30th Wisconsin Infantry Regiment during the American Civil War.

M. D. Bartlett married Mary Lavina Brewster at Ellisburg, New York, on August 12, 1853. Mary was a descendant of Elder William Brewster, who came to America aboard the Mayflower in 1620 and became an early leader of Plymouth Colony. Her father, Elisha Brewster, was one of the first settlers of Ellisburg, New York. The Bartletts had at least eight children together.

Bartlett's older sister, Ann Eliza Bartlett, married another Brewster descendant, his wife's cousin Dr. Adoniram Judson Brewster.

== Notes ==
Wisconsin Senate
New district created by 1861 Wisc. Act 216	Member of the Wisconsin Senate from the 32nd district January 6, 1862 – January 4, 1864	Succeeded by Carl C. Pope
Legal offices
New county established	County Judge of Pepin County, Wisconsin; January 1, 1859 – November 1861	Succeeded by Samuel L. Plummer
