= Edward C. Krause =

American politician and businessman (1914–1950)

Member of the Wisconsin State Assembly from the La Crosse 1st district
- In office January 6, 1941 – January 6, 1947
- Preceded by: Rudolph Schlabach
- Succeeded by: Raymond Bice Sr.

Personal details
- Born: December 14, 1914 La Crosse, Wisconsin, U.S.
- Died: November 20, 1950 (aged 35) La Crosse, Wisconsin, U.S.
- Cause of death: Suicide
- Resting place: Oak Grove Cemetery, La Crosse
- Party: Republican
- Spouse: Charlotte Ann Urban

Edward C. Krause (December 14, 1914 – November 20, 1950) was an American businessman and Republican politician from La Crosse, Wisconsin. He served three terms in the Wisconsin State Assembly, representing the city of La Crosse. He died by suicide.

== Biography ==
Born in La Crosse, Wisconsin, Krause graduated from La Crosse Central High School in 1932 and went to La Crosse State Teachers College. From 1941 until 1947, he served in the Wisconsin State Assembly as a Republican. During that time, he worked in a freight transportation company. In 1946, Ray Bice defeated Krause for reelection in the primary election. He worked for the Oscar Mayer Company in Madison, Wisconsin, after his defeat. He killed himself in La Crosse by shooting himself with a police officer's revolver at his former wife's house.

Wisconsin State Assembly
| Preceded by Rudolph Schlabach | Member of the Wisconsin State Assembly from the La Crosse 1st district January 6, 1941 – January 6, 1947 | Succeeded by Raymond Bice Sr. |
