= Levi Withee =

19th century American politician

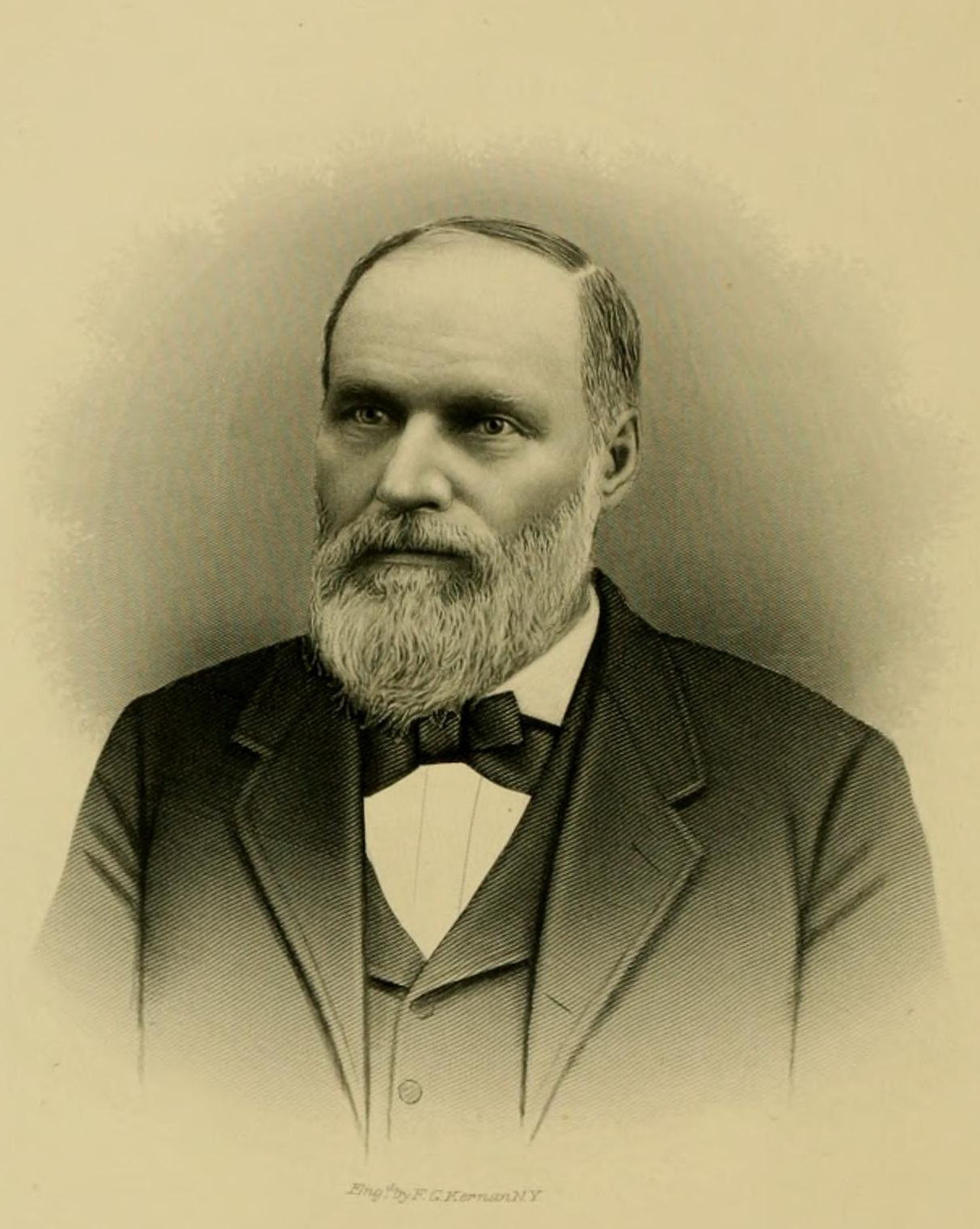
- Engraving by F. G. Kernan

Member of the Wisconsin Senate from the 32nd district
- In office January 2, 1893 – January 7, 1901
- Preceded by: Hugh H. Price
- Succeeded by: John C. Gaveney

Personal details
- Born: October 26, 1834 Somerset County, Maine, U.S.
- Died: February 2, 1910 (aged 75) La Crosse, Wisconsin, U.S.
- Resting place: Oak Grove Cemetery, La Crosse, Wisconsin
- Party: Republican
- Spouse: Lovisa Smith (m. 1868)
- Children: Abner G. Withee; (b. 1880; died 1954)
- Relatives: Niran Withee (brother)

Levi Withee (October 26, 1834 – February 2, 1910) was an American lumberman, businessman, and Wisconsin pioneer. He served eight years in the Wisconsin State Senate, representing La Crosse County.

== Biography ==
Withee was born on October 26, 1834, in Somerset County, Maine. He was raised on his father's farm and received a common school education. Upon reaching adulthood, he was tempted by the opportunities in the new western states and moved to Wisconsin. He arrived in La Crosse, Wisconsin, in 1853 and went to work in the lumber industry. By 1859, he had enough earnings to begin his own business further north, in Clark County, Wisconsin.

He was an owner or shareholder in many lumber companies in western Wisconsin, but was principally involved in the company Bright & Withee. He was also invested in the Electric Light Plant, the Gas Light Company, and the La Crosse Farming Company.

Withee was elected to the Wisconsin State Senate on the Republican ticket in 1892 and was re-elected in 1896, serving from 1893 to 1901. He did not run for a third term in 1900, but was a delegate that year to the 1900 Republican National Convention. He was a stalwart Republican, always opposed to Robert La Follette's Progressive Republicans, and endorsed a primary challenge against La Follete in his 1902 gubernatorial re-election campaign.

Withee died from a stroke in 1910.

== Personal life and family ==
Levi Withee was a son of Zachariah Withee and his wife Polly (née Longley). Zachariah Withee was a veteran of the War of 1812 and received land as a reward for his service. Levi Withee was the fifth of seven children. His older brother Niran Withee also worked as a lumberman in the La Crosse area and was a member of the Wisconsin Legislature.

On June 3, 1868, he married Louisa H. Smith. They had one son, Abner, who was also active in the lumber business in Wisconsin and Florida, and was appointed to the Bureau of Internal Revenue in Florida.

== Electoral history ==
Wisconsin Senate, 32nd District Election, 1892
Party	Candidate	Votes	%	±%
General Election, November 8, 1892
Republican	Levi Withee	5,802	49.27%	−5.01%
Democratic	George Y. Freeman	5,293	44.94%	+3.20%
Populist	John N. Jones	644	5.47%	
Prohibition	C. H. Van Wormer	38	0.32%	−3.66%
Plurality		509	4.32%	-8.22%
Total votes		11,777	100.0%	-4.05%
Republican hold				

Wisconsin Senate, 32nd District Election, 1896
Party	Candidate	Votes	%	±%
General Election, November 3, 1896
Republican	Levi Withee (incumbent)	9,545	66.82%	+17.56%
Democratic	Herman E. Simpson	4,739	33.18%	−11.77%
Plurality		4,806	33.65%	+29.32%
Total votes		14,284	100.0%	+21.29%
Republican hold				

Wisconsin Senate
Preceded by Hugh H. Price	Member of the Wisconsin Senate from the 32nd district January 2, 1893 – January 7, 1901	Succeeded by John C. Gaveney
