= William T. Price =

19th century American congressman

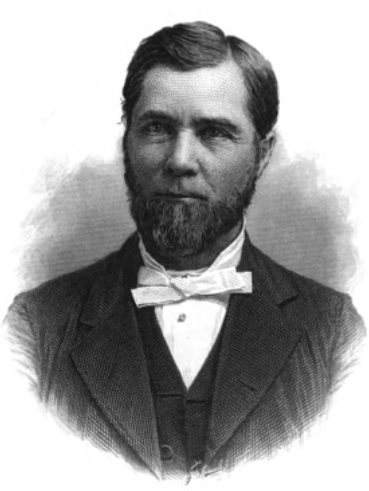
- From 1887's Memorial Addresses on the Life and Character of William T. Price

Member of the U.S. House of Representatives from Wisconsin's 8th district
- In office March 4, 1883 – December 6, 1886
- Preceded by: Thaddeus C. Pound
- Succeeded by: Hugh H. Price

President pro tempore of the Wisconsin Senate
- In office January 6, 1879 – January 5, 1880
- Preceded by: Levi W. Barden
- Succeeded by: Thomas B. Scott

Member of the Wisconsin Senate from the 32nd district
- In office January 7, 1878 – January 2, 1882
- Preceded by: Mark Douglas
- Succeeded by: Charles K. Erwin
- In office January 3, 1870 – January 1, 1872
- Preceded by: Alfred W. Newman
- Succeeded by: Orlando Brown

Member of the Wisconsin Senate from the 30th district
- In office January 5, 1857 – January 4, 1858
- Preceded by: Position established
- Succeeded by: William H. Tucker

Member of the Wisconsin State Assembly
- In office January 2, 1882 – January 1, 1883
- Preceded by: Alvin S. Trow
- Succeeded by: Ralza W. Button
- Constituency: Jackson district
- In office January 6, 1851 – January 5, 1852
- Preceded by: William T. Sterling
- Succeeded by: Andrew Briggs
- Constituency: Crawford–Chippewa district

Personal details
- Born: June 17, 1824 Huntingdon County, Pennsylvania, U.S.
- Died: December 6, 1886 (aged 62) Black River Falls, Wisconsin, U.S.
- Resting place: Riverside Cemetery, Black River Falls, Wisconsin
- Party: Republican
- Spouse: Julia Campbell (m. 1851–1886)
- Children: May Price^{(b. 1852; died 1872)}; William Thompson Price Jr.^{(b. 1857; died 1858)}; Hugh Hiram Price^{(b. 1859; died 1904)}; Margaret Price^{(b. 1871; died 1957)}

William Thompson Price (June 17, 1824 – December 6, 1886) was an American lawyer and Republican politician. He represented Wisconsin's 8th congressional district in the United States House of Representatives from 1883 until his death, and was succeeded by his son, Hugh H. Price. He is the namesake of Price County, Wisconsin.

== Early life and ==
Born in Huntingdon County, Pennsylvania, Price attended public schools. He was a clerk in a store in Hollidaysburg, Pennsylvania, and also studied law.

== Career ==
He moved to Mount Pleasant in the Iowa Territory in 1845, and in the following autumn moved to Black River Falls in the Wisconsin Territory. He engaged in lumbering and agricultural pursuits. He was deputy sheriff of Crawford County in 1849. He served as member of the Wisconsin State Assembly in 1851 and again in 1882. He was admitted to the bar in 1852 and engaged in the practice of law. In 1854, he moved to La Crosse, Wisconsin, and operated a stage line between La Crosse and Black River Falls. He moved back to Black River Falls and continued his legal practice until 1857. He served as judge of Jackson County in 1854 and 1859. He was sheriff of Crawford County in 1855 and County treasurer in 1856 and 1857. He served in the Wisconsin State Senate in 1857, 1870, and 1878–1881, and was president of the Senate in 1879. He served as collector of internal revenue 1863–1865.

Price was elected as a Republican to the Forty-eighth and Forty-ninth Congresses and served from March 4, 1883, until his death in Black River Falls, Wisconsin on December 6, 1886. He was interred in Riverside Cemetery. While in congress, he represented Wisconsin's 8th congressional district. To fill the vacancy caused by his death, his son, Hugh H. Price was elected to fill his place serving until the end of the Forty-ninth Congress.

Price County, Wisconsin is named in his honor.

== See also ==
- List of members of the United States Congress who died in office (1790–1899)

Wisconsin State Assembly
Preceded by William T. Sterling	Member of the Wisconsin State Assembly from the Crawford–Chippewa district January 6, 1851 – January 5, 1852	Succeeded by Andrew Briggs
Preceded by Alvin S. Trow	Member of the Wisconsin State Assembly from the Jackson district January 2, 1882 – January 1, 1883	Succeeded by Ralza W. Button
Wisconsin Senate
New district	Member of the Wisconsin Senate from the 30th district January 5, 1857 – January 4, 1858	Succeeded by William H. Tucker
Preceded by Alfred W. Newman	Member of the Wisconsin Senate from the 32nd district January 3, 1870 – January 1, 1872	Succeeded by Orlando Brown
Preceded by Mark Douglas	Member of the Wisconsin Senate from the 32nd district January 7, 1878 – January 2, 1882	Succeeded by Charles K. Erwin
Preceded by Levi W. Barden	President pro tempore of the Wisconsin Senate; January 6, 1879 – January 5, 1880	Succeeded by Thomas B. Scott
U.S. House of Representatives
Preceded by Thaddeus C. Pound	Member of the U.S. House of Representatives from Wisconsin's 8th congressional district March 4, 1883 - December 6, 1886	Succeeded by Hugh H. Price
