= Hugh H. Price =

19th century American politician

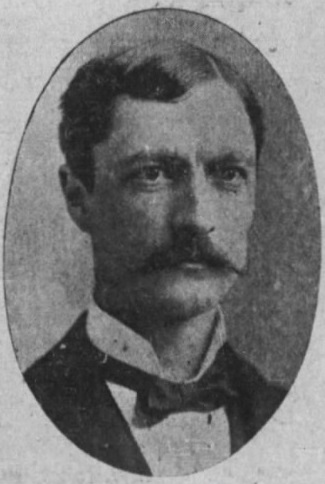
- Los Angeles Times, October 17, 1901

Member of the U.S. House of Representatives from Wisconsin's 8th district
- In office January 18, 1887 – March 3, 1887
- Preceded by: William T. Price
- Succeeded by: Nils P. Haugen

Member of the Wisconsin Senate from the 32nd district
- In office January 7, 1889 – January 2, 1893
- Preceded by: Charles K. Erwin
- Succeeded by: Levi Withee

Personal details
- Born: December 2, 1859 Black River Falls, Wisconsin, U.S.
- Died: December 25, 1904 (aged 45) Denver, Colorado, U.S.
- Party: Republican
- Spouse: Eliza Blakeley Graham (m. 1892–1904)
- Children: Thompson Price^{(b. 1895; died 1952)}
- Parents: William T. Price (father); Julia (Campbell) Price (mother)

Hugh Hiram Price (December 2, 1859 – December 25, 1904) was an American businessman and Republican politician. He served briefly as a member of the United States House of Representatives, elected to finish the term of his father, William T. Price, after his death in 1886. He later served in the Wisconsin State Senate, representing Jackson, Monroe, and Wood counties.

== Biography ==
Born in Black River Falls, Wisconsin, Price attended the grade and high schools, and the University of Wisconsin–Madison. He was engaged in milling and in the lumber business. He served as a member of the city council in 1885 and 1886, and as a member of the Jackson County Board in 1885 and 1886. Price also served as the Secretary of the Jackson County Agricultural Society in 1885.

Price was elected as a Republican to the Forty-ninth Congress to fill the vacancy caused by the death of his father, William T. Price. He took over representing Wisconsin's 8th congressional district, serving out the rest of the term (January 18, 1887 – March 3, 1887). He served as member of the Wisconsin Senate in 1889. Afterwards he resumed his former business pursuits.

He moved to Silver City, New Mexico Territory in 1894 and engaged in silver mining. He also owned mines in Mexico. He then moved to Phoenix, Arizona, and served as surveyor general of the Arizona Territory for two years. He relocated to Denver, Colorado, and lived in retirement until his death there on December 25, 1904.

He was interred in Fairmount Cemetery in Denver.

Wisconsin Senate
Preceded by Charles K. Erwin	Member of the Wisconsin Senate from the 32nd district January 7, 1889 – January 2, 1893	Succeeded by Levi Withee
U.S. House of Representatives
Preceded by William T. Price	Member of the U.S. House of Representatives from Wisconsin's 8th congressional district January 18, 1887 - March 3, 1887	Succeeded by Nils P. Haugen
