= Milo Knutson =

20th century American politician and radio broadcaster

Member of the Wisconsin Senate from the 32nd district
- In office January 6, 1969 – January 3, 1977
- Preceded by: Raymond Bice Sr.
- Succeeded by: Paul Offner

45th Mayor of La Crosse, Wisconsin
- In office April 1955 – April 1965
- Preceded by: Henry J. Ahrens
- Succeeded by: Warren Loveland

Personal details
- Born: October 12, 1917 Clear Lake, Iowa, U.S.
- Died: March 22, 1981 (aged 63) La Crosse, Wisconsin, U.S.
- Resting place: Oak Grove Cemetery, La Crosse, Wisconsin
- Party: Republican
- Spouse: Beatrice Louise Wigdahl (died 2004)
- Education: Coe College
- Occupation: radio journalist

Milo Garlock Knutson (October 12, 1917 – March 22, 1981) was an American radio broadcaster and Republican politician. He was the 45th mayor of La Crosse, Wisconsin, (1955–1965) and represented La Crosse for 8 years in the Wisconsin State Senate (1969–1977).

== Biography ==
Born in Clear Lake, Iowa, Knutson attended junior college in Mason City, Iowa, and Coe College in Cedar Rapids, Iowa. Knutson moved to La Crosse, Wisconsin, where he became the news director for WKTY. From 1955 until 1965, Knutson was the Mayor of La Crosse. Knutson served in the Wisconsin State Senate from 1969 until 1977 retiring because of health reasons.

Wisconsin Senate
Preceded by Raymond Bice Sr.	Member of the Wisconsin Senate from the 32nd district January 6, 1969 – January 3, 1977	Succeeded by Paul Offner
Political offices
Preceded by Henry J. Ahrens	Mayor of La Crosse, Wisconsin; April 1955 – April 1965	Succeeded by Warren Loveland
