= John C. Gaveney =

American politician and judge (1863–1947)

County Judge of Trempealeau County, Wisconsin
- In office November 28, 1930 – April 24, 1946
- Appointed by: Walter J. Kohler Sr.
- Preceded by: Earl G. Hensel
- Succeeded by: Albert Twesme

Member of the Wisconsin Senate from the 32nd district
- In office January 7, 1901 – January 2, 1905
- Preceded by: Levi Withee
- Succeeded by: Thomas Morris

Personal details
- Born: June 30, 1863 Arcadia, Wisconsin, U.S.
- Died: April 13, 1947 (aged 83) Whitehall, Wisconsin, U.S.
- Resting place: Arcadia Cemetery, Arcadia, Wisconsin
- Party: Republican
- Spouse: Isadore Delia Rasey (m. 1890–1947)
- Children: Shirleigh Marguerite (Doelle)^{(b. 1891; died 1967)}; Stanleigh Keyes Gaveney^{(b. 1896; died 1954)}
- Education: University of Wisconsin; University of Wisconsin Law School
- Profession: Lawyer, judge

John Comstock Gaveney (June 30, 1863 – April 13, 1947) was an American lawyer, Republican politician, and judge. He served four years in the Wisconsin State Senate, representing La Crosse and Trempealeau counties, and was county judge of Trempealeau County for over 15 years.

== Biography ==
Born in the town of Arcadia, Trempealeau County, Wisconsin, Gaveney went to Arcadia High School. Gaveney then received his bachelor's degree from University of Wisconsin in 1885 and his law degree from University of Wisconsin Law School in 1888. He then practiced law in Arcadia, Wisconsin, managed the family's lumberyard and flour mill, and helped organized the Western Wisconsin Telephone Company. Gaveney also was principal of the Arcadia and Independence High Schools. He served as president of the village of Arcadia. From 1901 to 1905, Gaveney served in the Wisconsin State Senate as a Republican. From 1930 until 1946, Gaveney served as Trempealeau County judge. Gaveney died of a heart attack sitting in a chair while smoking a cigar at his home in Whitehall, Wisconsin.

== Personal life and family ==
John Comstock Gaveney was the last surviving son of James Gaveney, an Irish American immigrant and pioneer of Trempealeau County. James Gaveney went to California during the Gold Rush and there encountered fellow Wisconsinite Noah D. Comstock. The two men drew guns and nearly killed each other over competing claims on a tract of mining land, but reason prevailed and they decided to work the claim in partnership. Their friendship endured for the rest of their lives. Noah Comstock was the source of John Comstock Gaveney's middle name.

Wisconsin Senate
Preceded by Levi Withee	Member of the Wisconsin Senate from the 32nd district January 7, 1901 – January 2, 1905	Succeeded by Thomas Morris
Legal offices
Preceded by Earl G. Hensel	County Judge of Trempealeau County, Wisconsin; November 28, 1930 – April 24, 1946	Succeeded by Albert Twesme
