= Edward Kraus =

Edward or Ed Kraus could refer to:

- Edward Henry Kraus (1875–1973), American academic and mineralogist
- Ed Kraus, interim chief of the Fort Worth Police Department
- Edward H. Kraus, mayor of Solon, Ohio

== See also ==
- Edward Krause (disambiguation)
