= Harry W. Griswold =

20th century American politician (1886–1939)

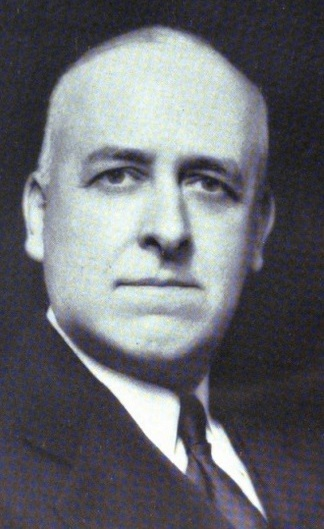

Member of the U.S. House of Representatives from Wisconsin's 3rd district
- In office January 3, 1939 – July 4, 1939
- Preceded by: Gardner R. Withrow
- Succeeded by: William H. Stevenson

Member of the Wisconsin Senate from the 32nd district
- In office January 2, 1933 – January 4, 1937
- Preceded by: Valentine S. Keppel
- Succeeded by: Oscar S. Paulson

Personal details
- Born: Harry Wilbur Griswold; May 19, 1886 near West Salem, Wisconsin, U.S.
- Died: July 4, 1939 (aged 53) Washington, D.C., U.S.
- Cause of death: Heart attack
- Resting place: Hamilton Cemetery, West Salem, Wisconsin
- Party: Republican
- Spouses: Mary Sybil Bailey (m. 1909; died 1924); Cora Fairbanks (m. 1920–1939)
- Children: 6
- Education: University of Wisconsin–Madison College of Agricultural and Life Sciences
- Occupation: Politician, farmer

Harry Wilbur Griswold (May 19, 1886 – July 4, 1939) was an American farmer and Republican politician from La Crosse County, Wisconsin. He was elected to represent Wisconsin's 3rd congressional district in the U.S. House of Representatives for the 76th Congress, but died just six months into his term. He previously served four years in the Wisconsin Senate, representing Wisconsin's 32nd Senate district from 1933 to 1937.

== Early life and education ==
Griswold was born on a farm near West Salem, Wisconsin, on May 19, 1886. He attended public and high schools in West Salem before attending the University of Wisconsin–Madison College of Agricultural and Life Sciences.

== Career ==
Griswold engaged in agricultural pursuits, specializing in the breeding of cattle. He served as president, secretary, and a director of the Wisconsin Guernsey Cattle Breeders Association.

Griswold served as a member of the West Salem school board from 1912 to 1929. He also served on the Wisconsin Board of Vocational Education from 1930 to 1936.

Griswold served in the Wisconsin Senate from 1932 to 1936, representing the 32nd legislative district of Wisconsin. During his time in office, he served on the committee of Contingent Expenditures and the Joint Committee on Finance.

Griswold was elected as a Republican to represent the 3rd congressional district of Wisconsin in the 76th United States Congress. His term began on January 3, 1939; he served until his death in office later that year.

Griswold missed only one of the 72 roll call votes taken between January 1939 and June 1939.

== Personal life and death ==
Griswold had a wife and five children.

Griswold died of a heart attack at the age of 53 while driving with his wife and one of his daughters in Washington, D.C., on July 4, 1939. He was interred in Hamilton Cemetery, located in West Salem.

== See also ==
- List of members of the United States Congress who died in office (1900–1949)

Wisconsin Senate
Preceded by Valentine S. Keppel	Member of the Wisconsin Senate from the 32nd district January 2, 1933 – January 4, 1937	Succeeded by Oscar S. Paulson
U.S. House of Representatives
Preceded by Gardner R. Withrow	Member of the U.S. House of Representatives from Wisconsin's 3rd congressional district January 3, 1939 – July 4, 1939	Succeeded by William H. Stevenson
