= Albert Twesme =

American politician (1879-1949)

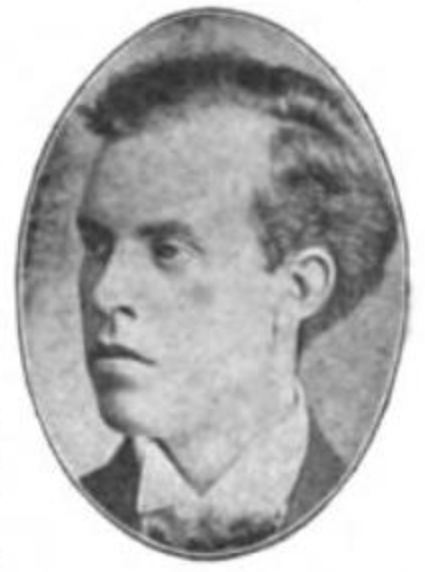

County Judge of Trempealeau County, Wisconsin
- In office May 13, 1946 – June 27, 1949 (death)
- Appointed by: Walter Samuel Goodland
- Preceded by: John C. Gaveney
- Succeeded by: Albert L. Twesme

Member of the Wisconsin State Assembly from the Trempealeau County district
- In office January 4, 1909 – January 2, 1911
- Preceded by: Herman Ekern
- Succeeded by: Peter Nelton

Personal details
- Born: August 7, 1879 Ettrick, Wisconsin, U.S.
- Died: June 27, 1949 (aged 69) West Salem, Wisconsin, U.S.
- Resting place: Pine Cliff Cemetery, Galesville, Wisconsin
- Party: Republican
- Spouse: Lunetta C. "Lulu" Burns (m. 1909–1949)
- Children: Albert L. Twesme^{(b. 1914; died 1995)}; Betty Burns (Godward) (Cowman)^{(b. 1918; died 2002)}
- Education: Gale College; University of Wisconsin Law School
- Profession: Lawyer, politician

Albert Theodore Twesme (August 7, 1879 – June 27, 1949) was an American lawyer, jurist, and Republican politician from Trempealeau County, Wisconsin. He represented Trempealeau County in the Wisconsin State Assembly during the 1909 session and later served as a county judge.

== Biography ==
Born on a farm in the town of Ettrick, Trempealeau County, Wisconsin, Twesme went to Gale College in Galesville, Wisconsin. He then received his bachelor's degree from University of Wisconsin in 1906 and his law degree from University of Wisconsin Law School in 1908. Twesme then practiced law in Galesville, Wisconsin. In 1909, Twesme served in the Wisconsin State Assembly as a Republican.

Twesme served as village president of Galesville from 1915 until 1917.

He sought the Republican nomination for Attorney General of Wisconsin in 1926, but lost to John W. Reynolds, Sr., who went on to serve three terms in the office. In 1934, he sought the Republican nomination for U.S. House of Representatives in Wisconsin's 9th congressional district, but lost the primary to Knute Anderson, who went on to lose the general election.

In the Spring of 1946, Twesme was appointed county judge of Trempealeau County to fill the vacancy left by the retirement of Judge John C. Gaveney. He was subsequently elected to a full term as county judge, but died not long after that. He suffered a heart attack while playing a round of golf at the Maple Grove Country Club in West Salem, Wisconsin, on June 27, 1949. After his death, his son, Albert L. Twesme, was appointed to succeed him as county judge.

== Personal life and family ==
Albert Twesme was one of at least eight children born to Norwegian American immigrants Lars and Begga (née Tveidt) Twesme.

Albert Twesme married Lunetta "Lulu" Burns in 1909. They had two children. Their son, Albert L. Twesme, served in the United States Navy aboard the battleship USS Colorado throughout many of the significant battles of the Pacific War, and was present at the Surrender of Japan in 1945. He went on to succeeded his father as county judge in 1949, and served in that office for 29 years until the office of Wisconsin county judge was abolished in 1978. He then was transitioned to become a Wisconsin circuit judge and served as the first chief judge of the 7th district of Wisconsin circuit courts from 1978 until his retirement in 1983.

Wisconsin State Assembly
Preceded by Herman Ekern	Member of the Wisconsin State Assembly from the Trempealeau County district January 4, 1909 – January 2, 1911	Succeeded by Peter Nelton
Legal offices
Preceded by John C. Gaveney	County Judge of Trempealeau County, Wisconsin; May 13, 1946 – June 27, 1949 (death)	Succeeded by Walter Samuel Goodland
