= Albert L. Twesme =

20th century American judge

Chief Judge of the 10th District of Wisconsin circuit courts
- In office August 1, 1978 – June 30, 1983
- Preceded by: Position established
- Succeeded by: James P. Fiedler

Wisconsin Circuit Judge for the Trempealeau circuit
- In office August 1, 1978 – June 30, 1983
- Preceded by: Position established
- Succeeded by: Richard Galstad

Judge of Trempealeau County, Wisconsin
- In office July 12, 1949 – July 31, 1978
- Appointed by: Oscar Rennebohm
- Preceded by: Albert Twesme
- Succeeded by: Position abolished

Personal details
- Born: May 4, 1914 Galesville, Wisconsin, U.S.
- Died: June 21, 1995 (aged 81) Galesville, Wisconsin, U.S.
- Resting place: Pine Cliff Cemetery, Galesville, Wisconsin
- Parent: Albert Twesme (father)
- Education: University of Wisconsin Law School
- Profession: Lawyer

Military service
- Branch/service: United States Navy
- Years of service: 1942–1946
- Rank: Lieutenant, USN
- Unit: USS Colorado (BB-45)
- Battles/wars: World War II: Pacific War; Occupation of Japan

Albert L. "Bud" Twesme (May 4, 1914 – June 21, 1995) was an American lawyer and judge from Trempealeau County, Wisconsin. He was county judge of Trempealeau County for 29 years, and was then the first chief judge of the 7th district of Wisconsin circuit courts, serving from 1978 until his retirement in 1983.

== Biography ==
Albert L. Twesme was born May 4, 1914, in Galesville, Wisconsin, which would be his primary residence for his entire life. He graduated from Galesville High School in 1932 and went on to attend the University of Wisconsin, graduating from the University of Wisconsin Law School in 1940.

He practiced law in partnership with his father for a short time before the outbreak of World War II. After the attack on Pearl Harbor, he quickly registered for service and was commissioned as an officer in the United States Navy in March 1942. He served as a legal officer aboard the battleship USS Colorado through all of its participation in the Pacific War, seeing battle at Tarawa, Kwajalein, Eniwetok, Saipan, Tinian, Guam, Leyte, Mindoro, Luzon, and Okinawa. At the end of the war, he was present at the Surrender of Japan and then served for about six months with the post-war Occupation of Japan.

After the war, he returned to the practice of law. His father was appointed county judge in 1946, but died three years later. A few days after his father's death, Governor Oscar Rennebohm appointed him to fill out the remainder of his father's term. Twesme was subsequently elected to a full term as judge, and was then re-elected four times, serving until the office of county judge was abolished in 1978. The 1978 transformation of the Wisconsin court system saw Twesme transitioned to become a Wisconsin circuit judge, and the Wisconsin Supreme Court selected him to serve as chief judge of the tenth district of Wisconsin circuit courts.

He served about five years as chief judge before announcing his retirement in the Spring of 1983. He ultimately retired in June 1983, but continued to serve as a reserve judge around the state for several years after.

While serving as a judge, he served terms as president of the Wisconsin Board of County Judges, the Wisconsin Board of Criminal Court Judges, the Wisconsin Trial Judges Association, the Juvenile Court Judges Association, and the Tri-County Bar Association. He served as a faculty advisor to the National Judicial College and served as a significant contributor to the Wisconsin Uniform Jury Instruction Book.

== Personal life and family ==
Albert L. Twesme was one of two children born to Albert T. Twesme and his wife Lunetta (née Burns) Twesme. Before serving as county judge, Albert T. Twesme represented Trempealeau County in the Wisconsin State Assembly, and ran for other state offices.

Albert L. Twesme married Dorothy Anderson of Cashton, Wisconsin, on July 10, 1947. They had four children together and were married for 48 years.

Albert L. Twesme died at his home in Galesville on June 21, 1995.

Legal offices
Preceded by Albert Twesme	County Judge of Trempealeau County, Wisconsin; July 12, 1949 – July 31, 1978	Position abolished
Position established	Wisconsin Circuit Judge for the Trempealeau circuit August 1, 1978 – June 30, 1983	Succeeded by Richard Galstad
Position established	Chief Judge of the 10th District of Wisconsin circuit courts August 1, 1978 – June 30, 1983	Succeeded by James P. Fiedler
