= Norman Clapp =

Norman M. Clapp
- Born: October 28, 1914; Ellsworth, Wisconsin
- Died: October 7, 1998 (aged 83); Clearwater, Florida

Norman Moses Clapp (October 28, 1914 – October 7, 1998) served as the Administrator of the Rural Electrification Administration in the Administrations of Presidents Kennedy and Johnson. Clapp also directed New York State's investigation of a July 1977 power blackout. He was a graduate of Lawrence University. Clapp served as Wisconsin's transportation secretary and chairman of the Public Service Commission in the 1970s.
