= John Mulder =

American politician

John Mulder (March 22, 1865 – December 9, 1941) was a member of the Wisconsin State Assembly.

== Biography ==
Mulder was born to Dutch immigrants on March 22, 1865, in New Amsterdam, Wisconsin. He died on December 9, 1941.

== Career ==
Mulder joined the Assembly in 1929. Additionally, he was Treasurer of La Crosse, Wisconsin, as well as an alderman and a member of the La Crosse Board of Education. He was a Republican.
