= Alexander Frederick =

American politician

Alexander Ernest Frederick (July 6, 1885 – April 7, 1974) was a Republican attorney, minister, politician, and animal welfare advocate, who served as a member of the Wisconsin State Assembly and as Wisconsin's first and only State Humane Officer. His name was often abbreviated as A. E. Frederick.

== Early life and career ==
Frederick was born in 1885 in Madison, Wisconsin and educated in Madison Public Schools. He attended the University of Wisconsin Law School.

After his graduation from the University of Wisconsin Law School and Georgetown University, he studied theology and entered ministry as an ordained pastor in the Methodist Episcopal Church. In 1912 he was appointed by Governor Francis E. McGovern as humane officer for Monroe County, Wisconsin, where he was active in reform movements. Frederick was also a probation officer and attorney who brought cases before state courts and tribunals, including the Railroad Commission of Wisconsin. Frederick fought in World War I, serving as a commanding officer in the United States Army.

== Public office ==
=== Wisconsin Assembly and Wisconsin Humane Officer ===
Frederick was first elected to the Wisconsin State Assembly in 1912 and re-elected in 1914. He assumed office in January 1913 and left office in January 1917, and served as chaplain of the Assembly. While in the legislature for two terms, Frederick was a member of the Judiciary Committee. He was the author of animal welfare policies and also worked to ensure that members of the legislature and its committees were sober during meetings. Frederick was later appointed to serve as Wisconsin State Humane Officer from 1919 to 1925. In 1925, Frederick was the author of The Humane Guide: a Manual for Teachers and Humane Workers.

=== Congressional candidacy ===
Frederick unsuccessfully ran to represent Wisconsin's 7th congressional district in the United States Congress.

== Personal life ==
A. E. Frederick was the father of National Organization for Women co-founder Kathryn F. Clarenbach and grandfather of David Clarenbach, a gay activist who served nine terms in the Wisconsin State Assembly and as Speaker pro tempore for ten years. Frederick died in 1974 and is buried in Woodlawn Cemetery in Sparta.
