= Raymond Bice Sr. =

20th-century American politician and historian

Raymond C. Bice Sr.

Member of the Wisconsin Senate from the 32nd district
- In office April 23, 1953 – January 6, 1969
- Preceded by: Rudolph Schlabach
- Succeeded by: Milo Knutson

Member of the Wisconsin State Assembly from the La Crosse 1st district
- In office January 6, 1947 – April 23, 1953
- Preceded by: Edward C. Krause
- Succeeded by: James D. H. Peterson

Personal details
- Born: April 5, 1896 La Crosse, Wisconsin, U.S.
- Died: December 14, 1994 (aged 98) La Crosse, Wisconsin, U.S.
- Resting place: Oak Grove Cemetery, La Crosse
- Party: Republican
- Spouses: Myrtle Blanche Olsen (died 1964); Mary Jane Rice (m. 1966; died 1984)
- Children: 4
- Occupation: Contractor

Military service
- Allegiance: United States
- Branch/service: United States Army
- Years of service: 1918–1919
- Battles/wars: World War I

Raymond Curtis Bice Sr. (April 5, 1896 – December 14, 1994) was an American building contractor, historian, and Republican politician from La Crosse, Wisconsin. He served 16 years in the Wisconsin Senate and six years in the State Assembly. He was also the author of several works about the history of the La Crosse area.

== Biography ==
Raymond C. Bice was born, raised, and lived nearly his entire life in La Crosse, Wisconsin. As a child, he worked at the Summit Foundry after school. He quit school at age 16 and went to work in a carpentry shop, but took classes from the University of Wisconsin Extension. He left that job in 1918, when he joined the United States Army and deployed to France in the midst of World War I.

When he returned from the war, he became a partner in the sash and door business with his grandfather, and then started a lumber business with his wife's brother. Through the latter business, they also became contractors for home construction. He became involved with the Republican Party of Wisconsin through business and civic organizations, and was elected to the La Crosse County Board of Supervisors in the 1930s, and was then the president of the La Crosse Chamber of Commerce in the early 1940s.

In 1946, he won his first term in the Wisconsin State Assembly, running on the Republican Party ticket. He was subsequently re-elected in 1948, 1950, and 1952. Shortly after the start of the 1953 legislative session, La Crosse's state senator, Rudolph Schlabach, resigned in order to accept an appointment from the Governor. The Governor then called a special election to replace Schlabach in the Senate, and Bice quickly entered the race for the Republican nomination. He prevailed in the March 1953 primary and went on to win the April special election with 73% of the vote.

He was subsequently re-elected in 1956, 1960, and 1964. For most of his time in office, his district comprised all of La Crosse County, as well as Jackson and Trempealeau counties. Following the 1964 court-ordered redistricting plan, his district shifted to the south, still comprising La Crosse, but exchanging Jackson and Trempealeau for Vernon and Crawford counties.

Bice ran for a fifth term in the Senate in 1968, but was defeated in a primary challenge by Milo Knutson. During the 1967 legislative session, Bice had been a strong supporter of a failed effort to raise Wisconsin's legal drinking age to 21 and other efforts to crack down on drunk driving. This had earned him powerful enemies in Wisconsin's influential Tavern League. Knutson was a radio news host and five-term mayor of La Crosse. With the Tavern League's support, he also ran with demagogic anti-University rhetoric after the campus was the site of major Vietnam War protests. In the end, Knutson prevailed with about 55% of the vote.

After leaving office, Bice remained active in state and local politics and civic affairs, and continued his construction business. By the time he had retired, his business had built more than 400 homes in the La Crosse area. In his later years, he also became a prolific painter and created hundreds of watercolor paintings over the last 25 years of his life.

== Personal life and family ==
Raymond Bice married Myrtle Blanche Olsen on June 4, 1917. They had three sons and one daughter before Myrtle's death in 1963. Bice remarried in 1966 with his neighbor, Mary Jane Rice, who had also recently been widowed. Their marriage lasted another 18 years until Mary's death in 1984.

In addition to his political and civic career, Bice also wrote two books about the history of the La Crosse area: Years to Remember and A Century to Remember.

Bice lived to age 98. He suffered a mild stroke in November 1994 and developed kidney complications while in the hospital. He died on December 5, 1994.

== Electoral history ==
=== Wisconsin Assembly (1946–1952) ===
| Year | Election | Date | Elected | | | | Defeated | | | | Total | Plurality |
|---|---|---|---|---|---|---|---|---|---|---|---|---|
| 1946 | Primary | Aug. 13 | Raymond C. Bice | Republican | 3,214 | 54.28% | Edward C. Krause (inc) | Rep. | 2,707 | 45.72% | 5,921 | 507 |
| 1946 | General | Nov. 5 | Raymond C. Bice | Republican | 7,572 | 100.0% | --Unopposed-- | | | | 7,572 | 7,572 |
| 1948 | General | Nov. 2 | Raymond C. Bice (inc) | Republican | 8,842 | 73.10% | Gene Luening | Dem. | 3,181 | 26.30% | 12,096 | 5,661 |
| 1948 | General | Nov. 2 | Raymond C. Bice (inc) | Republican | 8,842 | 73.10% | LeRoy Schamerhorn | Prog. | 73 | 0.60% | 12,096 | 5,661 |
| 1950 | General | Nov. 7 | Raymond C. Bice (inc) | Republican | 7,207 | 67.73% | William G. Lyons | Dem. | 3,433 | 32.27% | 10,640 | 3,774 |
| 1952 | General | Nov. 4 | Raymond C. Bice (inc) | Republican | 10,811 | 69.65% | Lee Swett | Dem. | 4,711 | 30.35% | 15,522 | 6,100 |

=== Wisconsin Senate (1953–1968) ===
| Year | Election | Date | Elected | | | | Defeated | | | | Total | Plurality |
|---|---|---|---|---|---|---|---|---|---|---|---|---|
| 1953 | Primary | Mar. 10 | Raymond C. Bice | Republican | 4,746 | 58.62% | Robert Schaller | Rep. | 3,350 | 41.38% | 8,096 | 1,396 |
| 1953 | Special | Apr. 7 | Raymond C. Bice | Republican | 19,155 | 73.52% | Harold Havenor | Dem. | 6,900 | 26.48% | 26,055 | 12,255 |
| 1956 | General | Nov. 6 | Raymond C. Bice (inc) | Republican | 24,861 | 56.62% | George T. Doherty | Dem. | 19,044 | 43.38% | 43,905 | 5,817 |
| 1960 | General | Nov. 8 | Raymond C. Bice (inc) | Republican | 26,092 | 53.80% | Keith C. Hardie | Dem. | 22,408 | 46.20% | 48,500 | 3,684 |
| 1964 | General | Nov. 3 | Raymond C. Bice (inc) | Republican | 24,575 | 52.55% | Charles F. Dahl | Dem. | 22,186 | 47.45% | 46,761 | 2,389 |
| 1968 | Primary | Sep. 10 | Milo Knutson | Republican | 8,739 | 54.92% | Raymond C. Bice (inc) | Rep. | 7,172 | 45.08% | 15,911 | 1,567 |

Wisconsin State Assembly
| Preceded by Edward C. Krause | Member of the Wisconsin State Assembly from the La Crosse 1st district January 6, 1947 – April 23, 1953 | Succeeded by James D. H. Peterson |
Wisconsin Senate
| Preceded by Rudolph Schlabach | Member of the Wisconsin State Assembly from the 32nd district April 23, 1953 – January 6, 1969 | Succeeded by Milo Knutson |
