= Lawrence R. Gibson =

American politician and businessman

Lawrence R. Gibson (September 15, 1912 – February 2, 2004) was an American politician and businessman.

Born in La Crosse, Wisconsin, Gibson went to University of Minnesota and University of Wisconsin–La Crosse. Gibson was a designer supervisor and was secretary and director of the Trane Employees Credit Union. From 1952 to 1955, Gibson served on the La Crosse Common Council and the Mary E. Sawyer Auditorium Board. In 1973, Gibson served in the Wisconsin State Assembly and was a Republican.
