= Carl C. Pope =

American lawyer and politician from Wisconsin

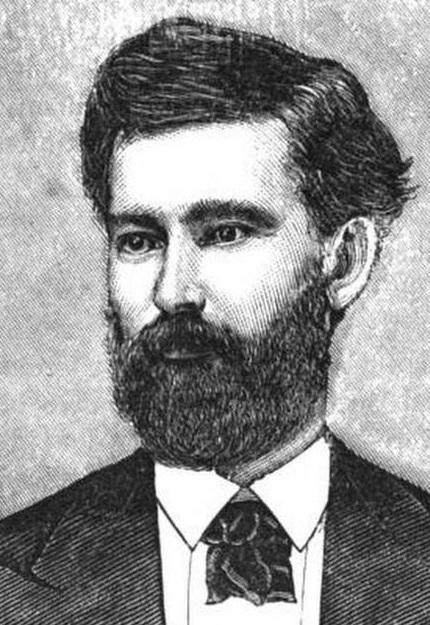
From 1875's An Illustrated History of the State of Wisconsin

Carl C. Pope (July 22, 1834 – February 23, 1911) was an American lawyer, legislator, and jurist. A Republican, he was most notable for his service in the Wisconsin State Assembly and Wisconsin State Senate.

== Biography ==
Pope was born Carlos Carpenter Pope in Washington, Vermont on July 22, 1834, the son of Ralph Pope and Mary (Richardson) Pope. He was educated in the schools of Washington and studied at Green Mountain Liberal Institute in South Woodstock, Vermont. He then studied law with Jefferson P. Kidder of Randolph, Vermont and in 1856 he was admitted to the bar in Chelsea, Vermont.

Soon after becoming an attorney, Pope relocated to Black River Falls, Wisconsin. Originally a Democrat, Pope supported the Union during the American Civil War and changed his political affiliation to Republican. In addition to practicing law in Black River Falls, among the offices in which Pope served were District Attorney of Jackson County (1857-1861, 1876–1878) and county judge (1872-1873).

Pope served in the Wisconsin State Assembly in 1862 and 1863, and was head of the Assembly's committee on federal relations. He was a delegate to the 1864 National Union National Convention, where Republicans and pro-Union Democrats nominated Abraham Lincoln for a second term as president and selected Andrew Johnson as his vice presidential running mate. In 1864 and 1865 Pope served in the Wisconsin State Senate, and he was appointed chair of the Senate judiciary committee. He served in the state Assembly again from 1877 to 1878, and was chair of the judiciary committee.

In addition to his professional and political activities, Pope was active as a Freemason. He was a member of the Black River Lodge of Ancient Free and Accepted Masons, the Black River Chapter of the Royal Arch Masons, and the Fort Winnebago Commandery of the Knights Templar in Portage, Wisconsin. He served as master of the Black River Lodge, and was the first high priest of the Black River Chapter.

== Death and burial ==
Pope died of pneumonia in Black River Falls on February 23, 1911. He was buried at Riverside Cemetery in Black River Falls.

== Family ==
In 1859, Pope married Ellen M. Hitchcock of West Troy, New York. They were the parents of two children, Ralph C. Pope studied law in his father's office and became city clerk of Black River Falls. Eugenia Pope was the wife of Edgar A. LeClair.
