= Rudolph Schlabach =

American lawyer and politician

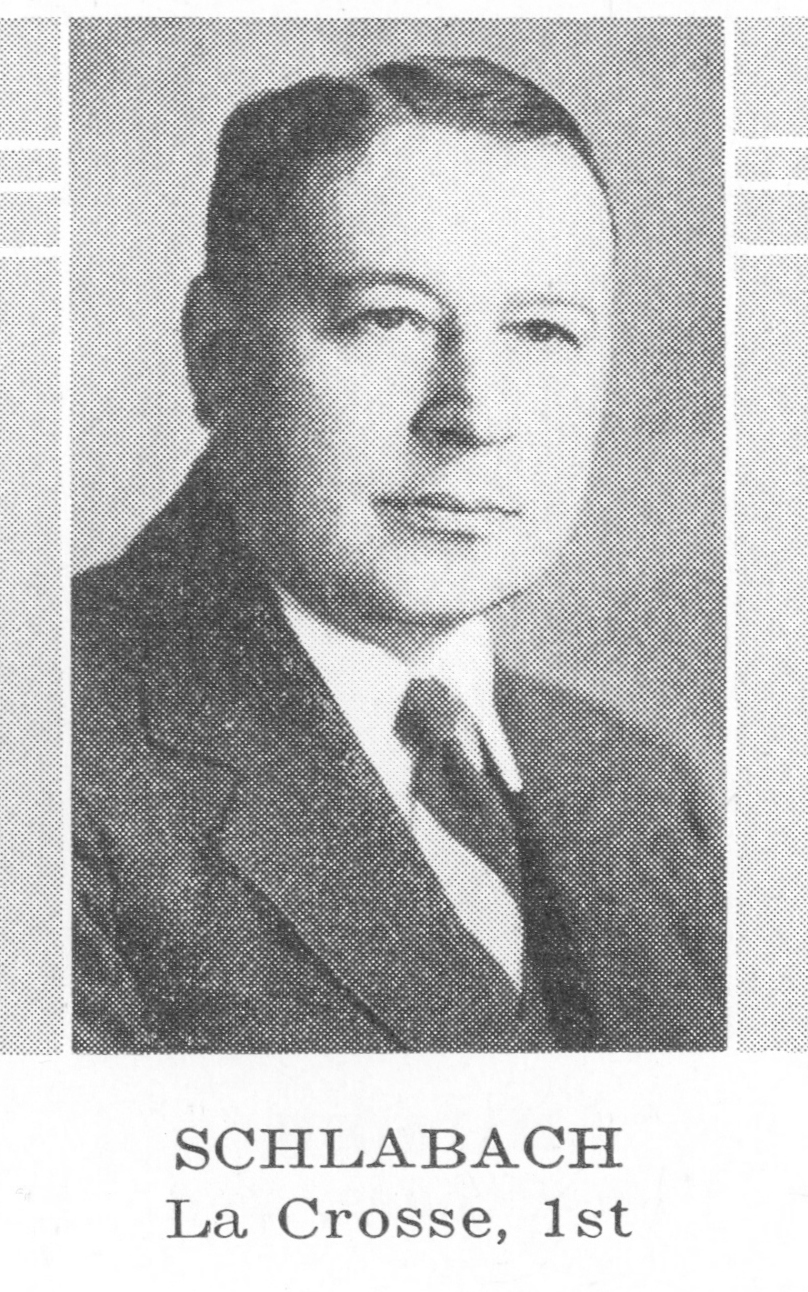
Rudolph M. Schlabach

Rudolph Mark Schlabach (April 4, 1890 – July 26, 1981) was an American lawyer and politician.

Born in La Crosse, Wisconsin, Schlabach graduated from Ohio Wesleyan University and taught high school. He served in World War I. Schlabach received his law degree from University of Wisconsin Law School and practiced law in La Crosse. Schlabach served as District Attorney of La Crosse County, Wisconsin. In 1939, he served in the Wisconsin State Assembly as a Republican. He then served in the Wisconsin State Senate 1941–1953. He resigned from the Wisconsin Senate in 1953 to accept an appointment to the Wisconsin State Board of Tax Appeals. Schlabach died in Madison, Wisconsin.
