= Charles K. Erwin =

American politician

Charles K. Erwin (December 15, 1837 – January 7, 1905) was an American businessman and politician.

Born in Washington, Lycoming County, Pennsylvania, Erwin settled in Portage, Wisconsin in 1853. From 1855 to 1868, Erwin lived in Jo Daviess County, Illinois and then in Stephenson County, Illinois. During the American Civil War, Erwin served in the 45th Illinois Volunteer Infantry Regiment. In 1868, Erwin moved to Tomah, Wisconsin and was in the mercantile business. From 1879 to 1882 and 1886, Erwin served on the Tomah Board of Education and was president of the school board. From 1882 to 1889, Erwin served in the Wisconsin State Senate and was a Republican. In 1889, Erwin served as postmaster for Tomah, Wisconsin. In 1902, Erwin moved with his family to Milwaukee, Wisconsin. Erwin died suddenly in Savanna, Illinois just as he was about get on a train for a trip to Omaha, Nebraska.
