= 64th Wisconsin Legislature =

Wisconsin legislative term for 1939–1940

←	63rd	65th	→
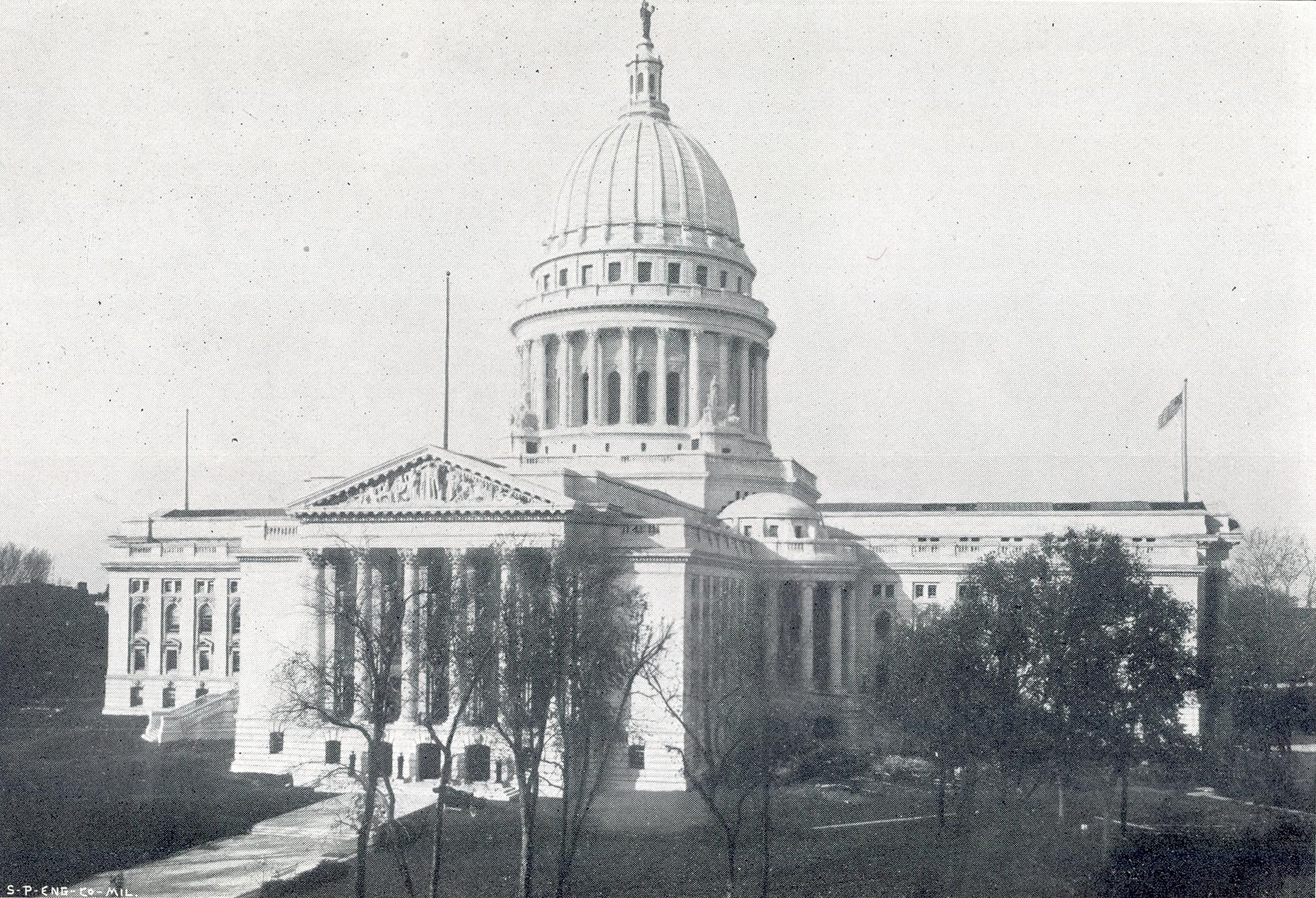
- Wisconsin State Capitol ca.1915

Overview
- Legislative body: Wisconsin Legislature
- Meeting place: Wisconsin State Capitol
- Term: January 2, 1939 – January 6, 1941
- Election: November 8, 1938

Senate
- Members: 33
- Senate President: Walter S. Goodland (R)
- President pro tempore: Edward J. Roethe (R)
- Party control: Republican

Assembly
- Members: 100
- Assembly Speaker: Vernon W. Thomson (R)
- Party control: Republican

Sessions
- Regular: January 11, 1939 – October 6, 1939

The Sixty-Fourth Wisconsin Legislature convened from January 11, 1939, to October 6, 1939, in regular session.

This session saw a significant reorganization of several state government functions, including the creation of the Department of Taxation, the Department of Public Welfare, the Department of Securities, and the Department of Motor Vehicles. This legislative term also coincided with the outbreak of World War II in Europe.

Senators representing odd-numbered districts were newly elected for this session and were serving the first two years of a four-year term. Assembly members were elected to a two-year term. Assembly members and odd-numbered senators were elected in the general election of November 8, 1938. Senators representing even-numbered districts were serving the third and fourth year of a four-year term, having been elected in the general election of November 3, 1936.

The governor of Wisconsin during this entire term was Republican Julius P. Heil, of Milwaukee County, serving a two-year term, having won election in the 1938 Wisconsin gubernatorial election.

== Major events ==
- January 2, 1939: Inauguration of Julius P. Heil as the 30th Governor of Wisconsin.
- February 10, 1939: Pope Pius XI died from a heart attack.
- March 2, 1939: The 1939 papal conclave elected Cardinal Secretary of State Eugenio Pacelli as the next pope, he then took the papal name Pius XII.
- March 15, 1939: German forces occupied the remaining independent portions of Bohemia and Moravia, abolishing the Republic of Czechoslovakia.
- April 1, 1939: The Spanish Civil War came to an end when the last republican forces surrendered to the fascists.
- April 3, 1939: U.S. President Franklin D. Roosevelt signed the Reorganization Act of 1939, granting the president powers for two years to reorganize the executive branch.
- July 1, 1939: The Executive Office of the President of the United States was established using the powers under the Reorganization Act of 1939.
- July 4, 1939: Wisconsin U.S. representative Harry W. Griswold (WI-03) died in office.
- August 2, 1939: Albert Einstein signed the Einstein–Szilard letter to U.S. President Franklin Roosevelt, advising him of the potential use of uranium to construct an atomic bomb.
- August 23, 1939: The Molotov–Ribbentrop Pact was signed pledging non-aggression between Nazi Germany and the Soviet Union, and dividing eastern Europe into spheres of influence for the two empires.
- September 1, 1939: German forces began the Invasion of Poland, inititating World War II.
- September 3, 1939: The United Kingdom, France, New Zealand, Australia, and India declared war on Germany.
- September 23, 1939: The recently completed Mississippi River Bridge at La Crosse, Wisconsin, was opened to traffic.
- October 8, 1939: Germany officially annexed western Poland.
- October 21, 1939: The first meeting of the U.S. Advisory Committee on Uranium, a precursor of the Manhattan Project.
- November 4, 1939: U.S. President Franklin Roosevelt signed the Neutrality Act of 1939, allowing the sale of weapons to the United Kingdom and France.
- November 30, 1939: Soviet forces invaded Finland, initiating the Winter War.
- December 10, 1939: The Green Bay Packers won the 1939 NFL Championship Game.
- March 5, 1940: Leaders of the Soviet Union signed the order leading to the Katyn massacre, mass executions of Polish intelligentsia.
- March 12, 1940: The Moscow Peace Treaty was signed, ending the Winter War. Finland made territorial concessions to the Soviet Union.
- April 9, 1940: German forces began Operation Weserübung, invading neutral countries Denmark and Norway.
- May 10, 1940:
  - German forces began the invasion of the Low Countries and the Battle of France.
  - Neville Chamberlain resigned as Prime Minister of the United Kingdom in favor of Winston Churchill.
- May 16, 1940: U.S. President Franklin Roosevelt requested from Congress credit of $900 million for the construction of 50,000 airplanes per year.
- May 17, 1940: German forces fully occupied the Netherlands, ending the Battle of Netherlands.
- June 4, 1940: The Dunkirk evacuation ended after safely evacuating 338,226 British and allied soldiers from German-occupied Europe.
- June 10, 1940: Italy declared war on the United Kingdom and France.
- June 13, 1940: Paris was declared an open city to avoid destruction.
- June 22, 1940: France and Germany signed the Armistice of 22 June 1940, ending the Battle of France. France was divided into a German occupied territory covering the north and west of the country, and a free state of Vichy France in the south.
- July 10, 1940: The Battle of Britain began.
- July 22, 1940: The United Kingdom refused a peace offer from Germany.
- September 7, 1940: German air forces began a campaign of carpet bombing in Britain, known as The Blitz.
- September 16, 1940: U.S. President Franklin Roosevelt signed the Selective Training and Service Act of 1940.
- September 27, 1940: Germany, Italy, and Japan signed the Tripartite Pact.
- November 5, 1940: 1940 United States general election:
  - Franklin D. Roosevelt (D) re-elected President of the United States. The first and only time a president was elected to a third term.
  - Julius P. Heil (R) re-elected Governor of Wisconsin.
  - Robert M. La Follette Jr. (P) re-elected United States senator from Wisconsin.
- November 11, 1940: The British Navy launched the first aircraft carrier strike in naval history against Italian naval units at the Battle of Taranto.
- November 11–12, 1940: The 1940 Armistice Day Blizzard resulted in 154 deaths, including 13 in Wisconsin.
- December 29, 1940: At one of his fireside chats, U.S. President Franklin Roosevelt declared that the United States must become "the great arsenal of democracy."

== Major legislation ==
- 1939 Act 57: Replaced the Wisconsin Labor Relations Board with the Employment Relations Board.
- 1939 Act 68: Created the Wisconsin Department of Securities to regulate the sale of stocks, bonds, etc.
- 1939 Act 85: Renamed the Wisconsin Department of Agriculture and Markets to the Wisconsin Department of Agriculture.
- 1939 Act 410: Consolidated automobile registration, licensing, inspection, and enforcement with the Wisconsin Department of Motor Vehicles.
- 1939 Act 412: Created the Wisconsin Department of Taxation and the Wisconsin Board of Tax Appeals.
- 1939 Act 435: Created the Wisconsin Department of Public Welfare.

== Party summary ==
=== Senate summary ===
Senate partisan composition Democratic: 6 seats Progressive: 11 seats Republican: 16 seats

	Party (Shading indicates majority caucus)			Total	
	Dem.	Prog.	Rep.	Total	Vacant
End of previous Legislature	9	16	8	33	0
Start of Reg. Session	6	11	16	33	0
From Sep. 20, 1939 (Note: Republican Morvin Duel (18th District) resigned to become state insurance commissioner.)	6	11	15	32	1
From Dec. 6, 1939 (Note: Democrat Francis A. Yindra (1st District) resigned.)	5	11	15	31	2
Final voting share	16.13%	35.48%	48.39%		
Beginning of the next Legislature	4	6	23	33	0

=== Assembly summary ===
Assembly partisan composition Democratic: 15 seats Progressive: 32 seats Republican: 53 seats

	Party (Shading indicates majority caucus)			Total	
	Dem.	Prog.	Rep.	Total	Vacant
End of previous Legislature	31	48	20	99	1
Start of Reg. Session	15	32	53	100	0
From Sep. 1, 1939 (Note: Democrat Alfred C. Grosvenor (Kenosha County) resigned.)	14	32	53	99	1
From Sep. 6, 1939 (Note: Progressive John W. Grobschmidt (Milwaukee County) died.)	14	31	53	98	2
From Sep. 25, 1939 (Note: Progressive Arthur D. Kelly (St. Croix County) died.)	14	30	53	97	3
From Oct. 5, 1939 (Note: Republican Reuben W. Peterson (Green Lake & Waushara counties) resigned.)	14	30	52	96	4
Final voting share	14.58%	31.25%	54.17%		
Beginning of the next Legislature	15	25	60	100	0

== Sessions ==
- Regular session: January 11, 1939 – October 6, 1939

== Leaders ==
=== Senate leadership ===
- President of the Senate: Walter S. Goodland (R)
- President pro tempore: Edward J. Roethe (R–Fennimore)
- Majority leader: Maurice Coakley (R–Beloit)
- Minority leader: Philip E. Nelson (P–Maple)

=== Assembly leadership ===
- Speaker of the Assembly: Vernon W. Thomson (R–Richland Center)

== Members ==
=== Members of the Senate ===
Members of the Senate for the Sixty-Fourth Wisconsin Legislature:

Senate partisan representation Democratic: 6 seats Progressive: 11 seats Republican: 16 seats

Dist.	Counties	Senator	Residence	Party
01	Door, Kewaunee, & Manitowoc	Francis A. Yindra (res. Dec. 6, 1939)	Manitowoc	Dem.
02	Brown & Oconto	Michael F. Kresky Jr.	Green Bay	Prog.
03	Milwaukee (South City)	Arthur L. Zimny	Milwaukee	Dem.
04	Milwaukee (Northeast County & Northeast City)	Milton T. Murray	Milwaukee	Rep.
05	Milwaukee (Northwest City)	Bernhard Gettelman	Milwaukee	Rep.
06	Milwaukee (North-Central City)	George Hampel	Milwaukee	Prog.
07	Milwaukee (Southeast County & Southeast City)	Anthony P. Gawronski	Milwaukee	Dem.
08	Milwaukee (Western County)	Allen Busby	West Milwaukee	Prog.
09	Milwaukee (City Downtown)	Cornelius T. Young	Milwaukee	Dem.
10	Buffalo, Pepin, Pierce, & St. Croix	Kenneth S. White	River Falls	Rep.
11	Bayfield, Burnett, Douglas, & Washburn	Philip E. Nelson	Maple	Prog.
12	Ashland, Iron, Price, Rusk, Sawyer, & Vilas	Joseph E. McDermid	Ladysmith	Prog.
13	Dodge & Washington	Jesse Peters	Hartford	Rep.
14	Outagamie & Shawano	Mike Mack	Shiocton	Rep.
15	Rock	Maurice Coakley	Beloit	Rep.
16	Crawford, Grant, & Vernon	Edward J. Roethe	Fennimore	Rep.
17	Green, Iowa, & Lafayette	Carl Lovelace	Woodford	Rep.
18	Fond du Lac, Green Lake & Waushara	Morvin Duel (res. Sep. 20, 1939)	Fond du Lac	Rep.
19	Calumet & Winnebago	Taylor G. Brown	Oshkosh	Rep.
20	Ozaukee & Sheboygan	Harry W. Bolens	Port Washington	Dem.
21	Racine	Kenneth L. Greenquist	Racine	Prog.
22	Kenosha & Walworth	Conrad Shearer	Kenosha	Rep.
23	Portage & Waupaca	Fred R. Fisher	Waupaca	Rep.
24	Clark, Taylor, & Wood	Walter J. Rush	Neillsville	Prog.
25	Lincoln & Marathon	Otto Mueller	Wausau	Rep.
26	Dane	Fred Risser	Madison	Prog.
27	Columbia, Richland, & Sauk	Jess Miller	Richland Center	Rep.
28	Chippewa & Eau Claire	G. Erle Ingram	Eau Claire	Prog.
29	Barron, Dunn, & Polk	Albert J. Connors	Barron	Prog.
30	Florence, Forest, Langlade, Marinette, & Oneida	Ernest Sauld	Pembine	Dem.
31	Adams, Juneau, Monroe, & Marquette	Amrose B. Coller	Necedah	Rep.
32	Jackson, La Crosse, & Trempealeau	Oscar S. Paulson	La Crosse	Prog.
33	Jefferson & Waukesha	William A. Freehoff	Waukesha	Rep.

=== Members of the Assembly ===
Members of the Assembly for the Sixty-Fourth Wisconsin Legislature:

Assembly partisan composition Democratic: 15 seats Progressive: 32 seats Republican: 53 seats

Milwaukee County districts

Senate Dist.	County	Dist.	Representative	Party	Residence
31	Adams & Marquette		Robert M. Long	Rep.	Westfield
12	Ashland		Harry P. Van Guilder	Prog.	Ashland
29	Barron		Charles H. Sykes	Prog.	Cameron
11	Bayfield		Laurie E. Carlson	Prog.	Bayfield
02	Brown	1	Harold A. Lytie	Dem.	Green Bay
02	Brown	2	William J. Sweeney	Dem.	De Pere
10	Buffalo & Pepin		David I. Hammergren	Rep.	Cochrane
11	Burnett & Washburn		Guy Benson	Rep.	Spooner
19	Calumet		Carl J. Peik	Prog.	Chilton
28	Chippewa		George H. Hipke	Rep.	Stanley
24	Clark		Walter E. Cook	Rep.	Unity
27	Columbia		Arthur E. Austin	Rep.	Rio
16	Crawford		Donald C. McDowell	Rep.	Soldiers Grove
26	Dane	1	Herbert C. Schenk	Prog.	Madison
26	Dane	2	James C. Hanson	Prog.	Deerfield
26	Dane	3	Otto F. Toepfer	Rep.	Middleton
13	Dodge	1	Elmer L. Genzmer	Dem.	Mayville
13	Dodge	2	William E. Jones	Rep.	Beaver Dam
01	Door		Frank N. Graass	Rep.	Sturgeon Bay
11	Douglas	1	James S. Mace	Prog.	Superior
11	Douglas	2	Elmer Peterson	Prog.	Poplar
29	Dunn		Earl W. Hanson	Rep.	Elk Mound
28	Eau Claire		John T. Pritchard	Prog.	Eau Claire
30	Florence, Forest, & Oneida		Henry J. Berquist	Prog.	Rhinelander
18	Fond du Lac	1	Maurice J. Fitzsimons Jr.	Dem.	Fond du Lac
18	Fond du Lac	2	Arthur F. Hinz	Rep.	Ripon
16	Grant	1	William H. Goldthorpe	Rep.	Cuba City
16	Grant	2	P. Bradley McIntyre	Rep.	Lancaster
17	Green		Harry A. Keegan	Rep.	Monroe
18	Green Lake & Waushara		Reuben W. Peterson (res. Oct. 5, 1939)	Rep.	Berlin
17	Iowa		Glenn H. James	Rep.	Montfort
12	Iron & Vilas		Paul Alfonsi	Prog.	Pence
32	Jackson		Peter A. Hemmy	Prog.	Humbird
33	Jefferson		Palmer F. Daugs	Dem.	Fort Atkinson
31	Juneau		William H. Barnes	Prog.	New Lisbon
22	Kenosha	1	Alfred C. Grosvenor (res. Sep. 1, 1939)	Dem.	Kenosha
22	Kenosha	2	Matt G. Siebert	Dem.	Salem
01	Kewaunee		Albert D. Shimek	Dem.	Algoma
32	La Crosse	1	Rudolph Schlabach	Rep.	La Crosse
32	La Crosse	2	William F. Miller	Rep.	West Salem
17	Lafayette		Henry Youngblood	Rep.	Wiota
30	Langlade		Valentine P. Rath	Dem.	Antigo
25	Lincoln		Reno W. Trego	Prog.	Merrill
01	Manitowoc	1	Otto A. Vogel	Prog.	Manitowoc
01	Manitowoc	2	Frank E. Riley	Rep.	Two Rivers
25	Marathon	1	Anthony Gruszka	Rep.	Mosinee
25	Marathon	2	John F. Dittbrender	Prog.	Ringle
30	Marinette		Charles A. Budlong	Rep.	Marinette
09	Milwaukee	1	Walter J. Domach	Dem.	Milwaukee
06	Milwaukee	2	Andrew Biemiller	Prog.	Milwaukee
08	Milwaukee	3	Arthur J. Balzer	Lib.Dem.	Milwaukee
09	Milwaukee	4	Robert E. Tehan	Dem.	Milwaukee
03	Milwaukee	5	Claud H. Larsen	Prog.	Milwaukee
09	Milwaukee	6	Ben Rubin	Prog.	Milwaukee
06	Milwaukee	7	Arthur Koegel	Prog.	Milwaukee
08	Milwaukee	8	Charles H. Judd	Rep.	Milwaukee
05	Milwaukee	9	Edward L. Graf	Rep.	Milwaukee
07	Milwaukee	10	John W. Grobschmidt (died Sep. 6, 1939)	Prog.	South Milwaukee
03	Milwaukee	11	Clement Stachowiak	Prog.	Milwaukee
07	Milwaukee	12	Peter Pyszczynski	Dem.	Milwaukee
04	Milwaukee	13	Bernard B. Kroenke	Dem.	Milwaukee
04	Milwaukee	14	John C. McBride	Rep.	Milwaukee
05	Milwaukee	15	Ben G. Slater	Rep.	Milwaukee
06	Milwaukee	16	Herman B. Wegner	Prog.	Milwaukee
07	Milwaukee	17	William F. Double	Rep.	Milwaukee
06	Milwaukee	18	Edward H. Kiefer	Prog.	Milwaukee
05	Milwaukee	19	Charles F. Westfahl	Rep.	Milwaukee
08	Milwaukee	20	Walter Nortman	Rep.	Wauwatosa
31	Monroe		Alex L. Nicol	Prog.	Sparta
02	Oconto		John E. Youngs	Rep.	Oconto
14	Outagamie	1	Mark Catlin Jr.	Rep.	Appleton
14	Outagamie	2	William J. Gantter	Rep.	Kaukauna
20	Ozaukee		Nicholas J. Bichler	Dem.	Belgium
10	Pierce		Theodore Swanson	Prog.	Ellsworth
29	Polk		Dougald D. Kennedy	Prog.	Amery
23	Portage		John Kostuck	Prog.	Stevens Point
12	Price		Ernest A. Heden	Rep.	Ogema
21	Racine	1	John L. Sieb	Prog.	Racine
21	Racine	2	Jack Harvey	Prog.	Racine
21	Racine	3	Martin H. Herzog	Prog.	Sturtevant
27	Richland		Vernon W. Thomson	Rep.	Richland Center
15	Rock	1	Edward Grassman	Rep.	Edgerton
15	Rock	2	Burger M. Engebretson	Rep.	Beloit
12	Rusk & Sawyer		Robert H. Burns	Rep.	Ladysmith
27	Sauk		Charles Enge	Rep.	Sauk City
14	Shawano		Melvin H. Schlytter	Rep.	Wittenberg
20	Sheboygan	1	Benjamin W. Diederich	Rep.	Sheboygan
20	Sheboygan	2	Edwin J. Larson	Rep.	Plymouth
10	St. Croix		Arthur D. Kelly (died Sep. 25, 1939)	Prog.	Hudson
24	Taylor		Carl M. Nelson	Rep.	Medford
32	Trempealeau		Norris J. Kellman	Rep.	Galesville
16	Vernon		Charles W. Fowell Jr.	Rep.	Viroqua
22	Walworth		Ora R. Rice	Rep.	Delavan
13	Washington		Joseph A. Schmitz	Rep.	Germantown
33	Waukesha	1	Lyle E. Douglass	Rep.	Waukesha
33	Waukesha	2	Alfred R. Ludvigsen	Rep.	Pewaukee
23	Waupaca		Julius Spearbraker	Rep.	Clintonville
19	Winnebago	1	Leo T. Niemuth	Rep.	Oshkosh
19	Winnebago	2	James C. Fritzen	Rep.	Neenah
24	Wood		William W. Clark	Rep.	Vesper

== Committees ==
=== Senate committees ===
- Senate Standing Committee on Agriculture and Labor – C. Shearer, chair
- Senate Standing Committee on Committees – H. W. Bolens, chair
- Senate Standing Committee on Contingent Expenditures – M. Duel, chair
- Senate Standing Committee on Corporations and Taxation – C. T. Young, chair
- Senate Standing Committee on Education and Public Welfare – E. J. Roethe, chair
- Senate Standing Committee on Highways – M. Mack, chair
- Senate Standing Committee on the Judiciary – M. Coakley, chair
- Senate Standing Committee on Legislative Procedure – E. J. Roethe, chair
- Senate Standing Committee on State and Local Government – B. Gettelman, chair

=== Assembly committees ===
- Assembly Standing Committee on Agriculture – O. R. Rice, chair
- Assembly Standing Committee on Commerce and Manufactures – B. M. Engebretson, chair
- Assembly Standing Committee on Conservation – F. N. Graass, chair
- Assembly Standing Committee on Contingent Expenditures – E. Grassman, chair
- Assembly Standing Committee on Education – W. H. Goldthorpe, chair
- Assembly Standing Committee on Elections – M. Catlin, chair
- Assembly Standing Committee on Engrossed Bills – H. Youngblood, chair
- Assembly Standing Committee on Enrolled Bills – C. M. Nelson, chair
- Assembly Standing Committee on Excise and Fees – L. E. Douglass, chair
- Assembly Standing Committee on Highways – D. C. McDowell, chair
- Assembly Standing Committee on Insurance and Banking – M. Catlin, chair
- Assembly Standing Committee on the Judiciary – R. W. Peterson, chair
- Assembly Standing Committee on Labor – A. R. Ludvigsen, chair
- Assembly Standing Committee on Municipalities – A. F. Hinz, chair
- Assembly Standing Committee on Printing – W. F. Miller, chair
- Assembly Standing Committee on Public Welfare – G. H. Hipke, chair
- Assembly Standing Committee on Revision – A. C. Grosvenor, chair
- Assembly Standing Committee on Rules – R. W. Peterson, chair
- Assembly Standing Committee on State Affairs – C. A. Budlong, chair
- Assembly Standing Committee on Taxation – M. J. Fitzsimons, chair
- Assembly Standing Committee on Third Reading – L. T. Niemuth, chair
- Assembly Standing Committee on Transportation – D. I. Hammergren, chair

=== Joint committees ===
- Joint Standing Committee on Finance – O. Mueller (Sen.) & P. B. McIntyre (Asm.), co-chairs

== Employees ==
=== Senate employees ===
- Chief Clerk: Lawrence R. Larsen
  - Assistant Chief Clerk: Thomas M. Donahue
- Sergeant-at-Arms: Emil A. Hartman
  - Assistant Sergeant-at-Arms: Albert E. Daley

=== Assembly employees ===
- Chief Clerk: John J. Slocum
  - Assistant Chief Clerk: Frederick W. Krez
- Sergeant-at-Arms: Robert A. Merrill
  - Assistant Sergeant-at-Arms: Phillip K. Lalor
