= Schlytter =

Schlytter is a surname. Notable people with the surname include:

- Boye Schlytter (1891–1977), Norwegian businessman and mountain climber
- Melvin H. Schlytter (1890–1959), American politician

== See also ==
- Schlatter
