= Grobschmidt =

Grobschmidt is a German surname. Notable people with the surname include:

- John W. Grobschmidt (1896–1939), American businessman and politician
- Richard Grobschmidt (1948–2016), American educator and politician
