= Herbert C. Schenk =

American politician

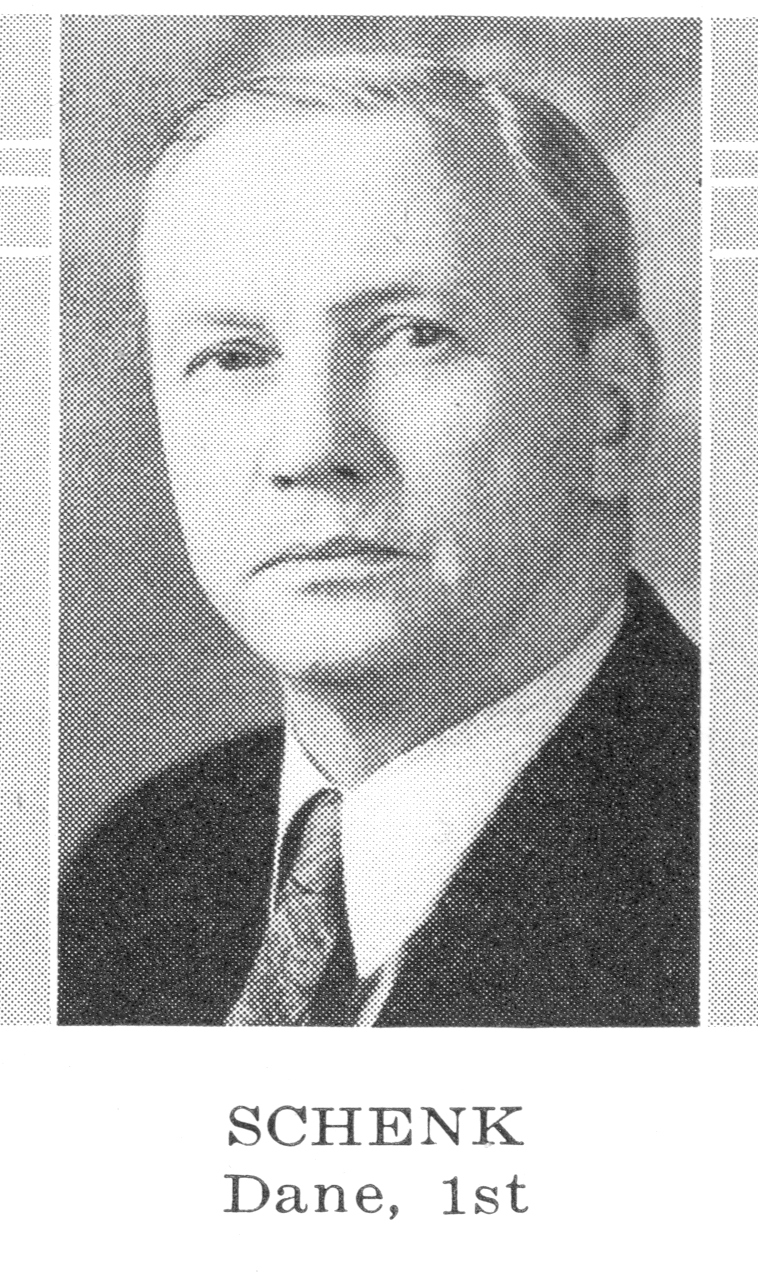
Herbert Christian Schenk

Herbert Christian Schenk (June 26, 1880 – April 18, 1972) was an American businessman from Madison, Wisconsin who served as a Wisconsin Progressive Party member of the Wisconsin State Assembly from Dane County, and held a number of positions in local government.

== Background ==
Schenk was born on June 26, 1880, in Leeds, Wisconsin, and came with his family to Madison in 1893. He attended elementary school in Madison, and graduated from Northwestern Business College in 1898. He worked in lumberyards in Madison, Stoughton and Orfordville from 1901 until 1908, before joining his family's hardware business in Madison. He took it over in the 1920s, and would operate it until his 1951 retirement.

== Political office ==
Schenk first joined the Madison Schools board of education January 19, 1923. (He would remain on the board until 1950, including 11 years as its chairman.) He would also serve as a member of the city board of health from 1924 to 1939, and the city park commission from 1924 to 1948.

He became the director of the Madison Association of Commerce in 1932, holding that position until 1934, when he won a modest plurality in the six-way primary election of the newly organized Wisconsin Progressive Party for the 1st Dane County district (the City of Madison) of the Wisconsin State Assembly, and in the general election unseated the incumbent, Republican Francis Lamb, with 9573 votes to 7932 for Lamb, 3966 for Democrat Fred T. Frusher, and 331 for independent Leo Bassett. He was appointed to the standing committees on insurance and banking, and on municipalities; and to a special committee on the Wisconsin bicentennial. In 1936, after easily winning his primary over a single challenger, he won re-election, with 16,077 votes to 8206 for Republican Virgil Roick and 3012 for Democrat Fred F. Frusher, Jr. He shifted to the committees on labor and state affairs. In 1938, he managed a modest plurality over two challengers in the primary, and won re-election in the general with 11,093 votes to 7774 for Republican Carl Danhouser and 1812 for Democrat Arthur Metz. He returned to the insurance and banking committee, and was also assigned to the education committee. In 1940, he lost his party's primary to Lyall T. Beggs, who would go on to win the general election.

In 1944, he was the Progressive nominee for the United States House of Representatives from Wisconsin's 2nd congressional district. He lost to Robert Kirkland Henry, coming in third in a four-way general election. His April 1950 resignation from the school board was so that he could serve the first of two terms on the Madison City Council, to which he'd just been elected.

== Later years ==
His wife Clara died in 1961, and the next year he moved to California. He died on April 18, 1972, in Concord, California.
