= George J. Woerth =

American politician

George J. Woerth (December 4, 1875, in Loganville, Wisconsin – ?) was a member of the Wisconsin State Assembly. He attended Wartburg College.

== Career ==
Woerth was first a member of the Assembly from 1935 to 1939 as a member of the Wisconsin Progressive Party. He was defeated in 1938 by Charles Enge. Woerth later re-joined the Assembly in 1940 and became a member of the Republican Party.
