= Edward H. Kiefer =

American politician (1874–1951)

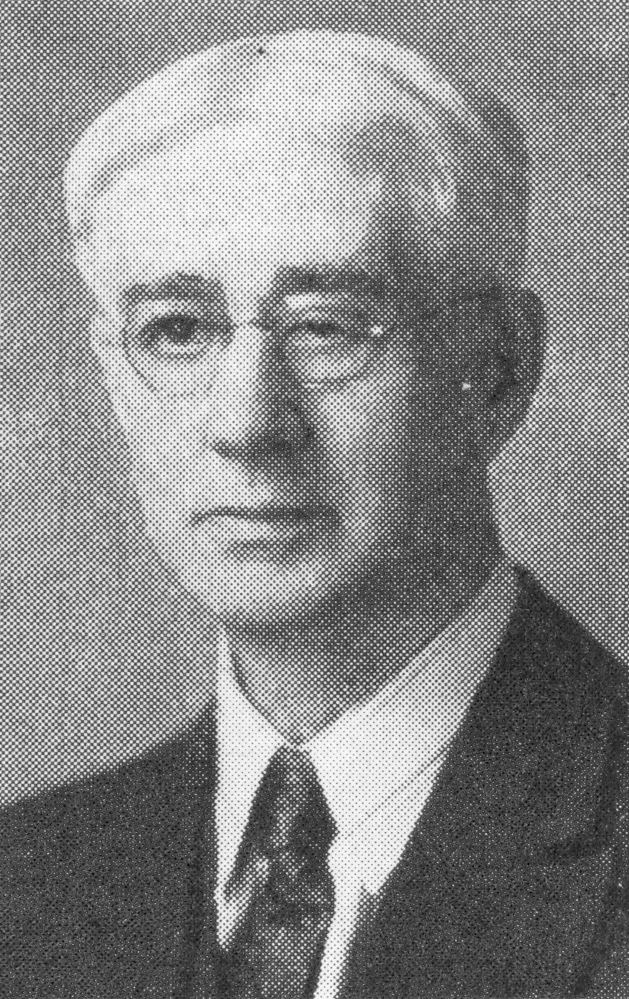
- Kiefer c. 1940

Member of the Wisconsin State Assembly
- In office January 5, 1931 – January 6, 1941
- Preceded by: Norman R. Klug
- Succeeded by: Frank Weinheimer
- Constituency: Milwaukee 20th (1931–1933); Milwaukee 18th (1933–1941)
- In office January 2, 1911 – January 4, 1915
- Preceded by: Peter F. Leuch
- Succeeded by: Frank J. Weber
- Constituency: Milwaukee 15th (1911–1913); Milwaukee 10th (1913–1915)

Personal details
- Born: May 1, 1874 Milwaukee, Wisconsin, U.S.
- Died: April 14, 1951 (aged 76)
- Party: Socialist; Progressive
- Profession: Painter, politician

Edward H. Kiefer (May 1, 1874–April 14, 1951) was an American house painter who served seven terms (1911–1914 and 1931–40) as a member of the Wisconsin State Assembly representing Milwaukee. He ran initially as a Socialist, then became a Progressive.

== Early life ==
Kiefer was born in Milwaukee in 1874 and was educated in the public and parochial schools of the city for three years. At age 9 he moved with his family to Morrison, Wisconsin, where he continued school. At 13 he returned to Milwaukee and attended school until age 15, when he became an apprentice painter, and practiced that trade for most of his life. He was active in the Brotherhood of Painters, Decorators and Paperhangers and served a leader of that trade union in various capacities for decades, eventually becoming the business agent for his local union (Local 781).

== Political career ==
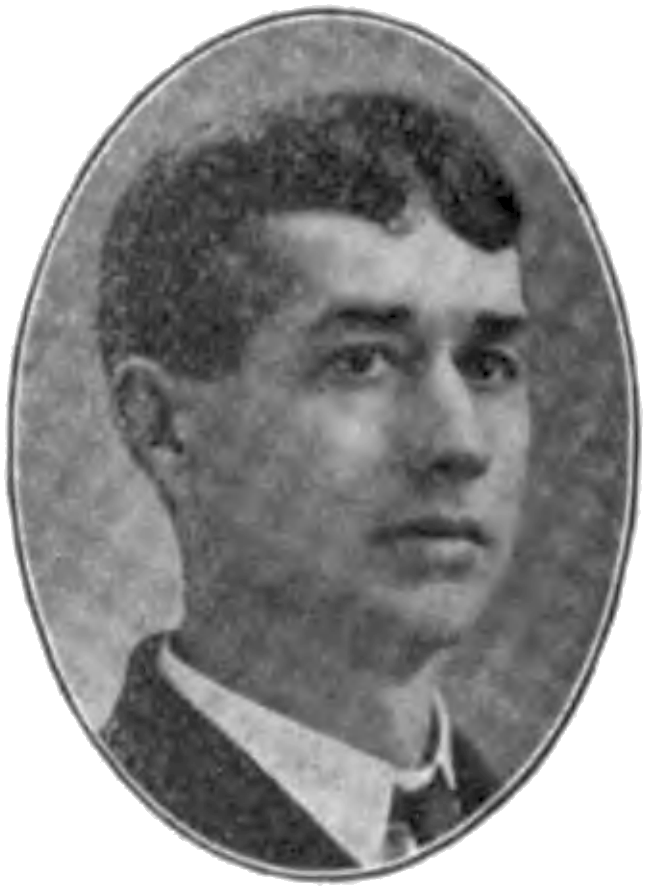
Kiefer's official State Assembly portrait, 1911

Kiefer was first elected to the Wisconsin State Assembly in 1910 as a Social Democrat (the Socialist Party of Wisconsin preserved the old term for some years); and was re-elected in 1912. In 1914, he ran for the Wisconsin State Senate, but lost to Democrat David V. Jennings; his house seat was picked up by fellow Socialist Frank J. Weber.

Eighteen years later, Kiefer ran again for the Assembly under the banner of what was now the Socialist Party. He won that 1930 election, and was re-elected in 1932 and 1934.

In 1935, Kiefer introduced a resolution in the Assembly that the state call a new constitutional convention so that the Wisconsin Constitution could be revised "to meet present day social needs." Kiefer and other socialist legislators wished to have increased state involvement in private industry, public ownership of utilities, confiscation of individual income over $10,000, and establishment of a state bank.

In 1936 he successfully ran for re-election as a Progressive (the Socialists and Progressives operated under a form of electoral fusion in this era) and won again with that label in 1938. Kiefer did not seek reelection to the Assembly in 1940, as he had already won a seat on the Milwaukee Common Council in 1939. His simultaneous holding of both posts came under fire from governor Heil.

Kiefer was twice elected as chairman of the Wisconsin central committee for the Wisconsin Progressive Party in 1940 and 1942. (By 1942 the cooperation agreement between the Socialists and Progressives was no longer in effect.)

== Personal life ==
He had five daughters and a son, including Isabella and Harold.
