= Albert J. Connors =

American politician (1891–1948)

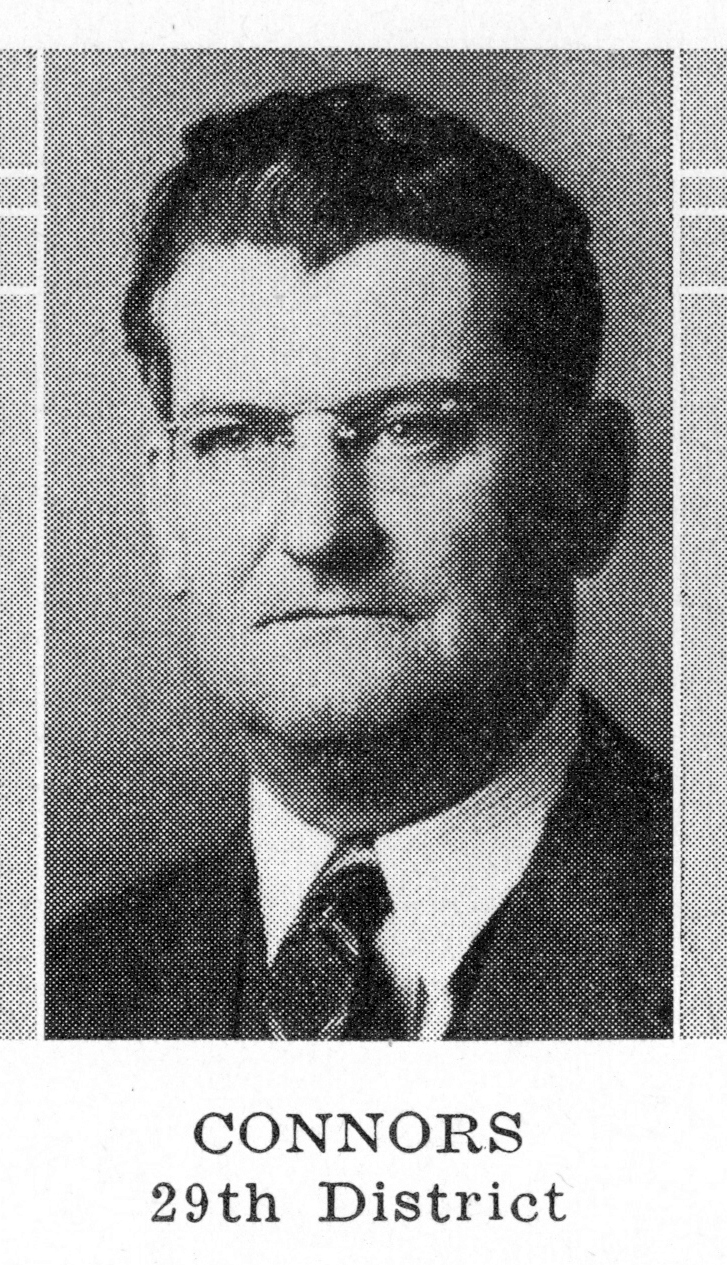
Albert James Connors

Albert James Connors (September 13, 1891 – October 26, 1948) was a member of the Wisconsin State Senate.

== Biography ==
Connors was born on September 13, 1891, in Duluth, Minnesota. During World War I, he served in the United States Army. He was a member of the American Legion and the Veterans of Foreign Wars.

== Political career ==
Connors defeated John Anderson in the primary election and then won the general election, serving as a member of the Senate from 1939 to 1942. Previously, he was District Attorney of Barron County, Wisconsin, in 1929. Additionally, he was a delegate to the 1932 Republican National Convention. While in the Senate, Connors was affiliated with the Wisconsin Progressive Party.

Connors died at his home in Rice Lake, Wisconsin, from a heart attack, at the age of 57.
