= Charles Enge =

American politician

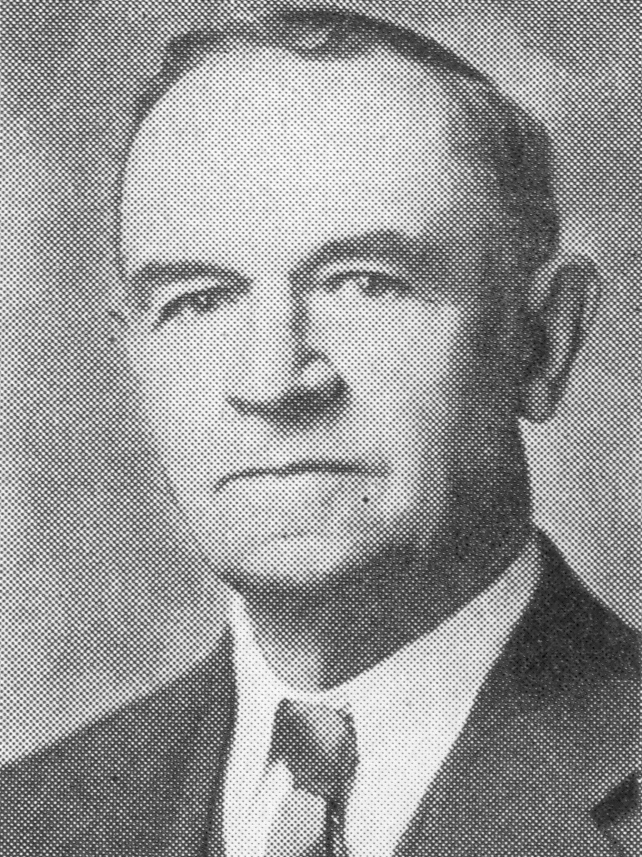
Enge during his time in the Wisconsin State Assembly

Charles Enge was a member of the Wisconsin State Assembly.

== Biography ==
Enge was born on March 28, 1869, in Sauk County, Wisconsin. On June 13, 1900, he married Mina G. Gasser. They would have six children. Enge died on August 30, 1945, in Troy, Sauk County, Wisconsin. He is buried in Prairie du Sac, Wisconsin.

== Career ==
Enge was a member of the Assembly from 1939 to 1940 after defeating George J. Woerth. He was a Republican. He also served on the school board and the Sauk County Board of Supervisors.
