= Charles W. Fowell Jr. =

American politician

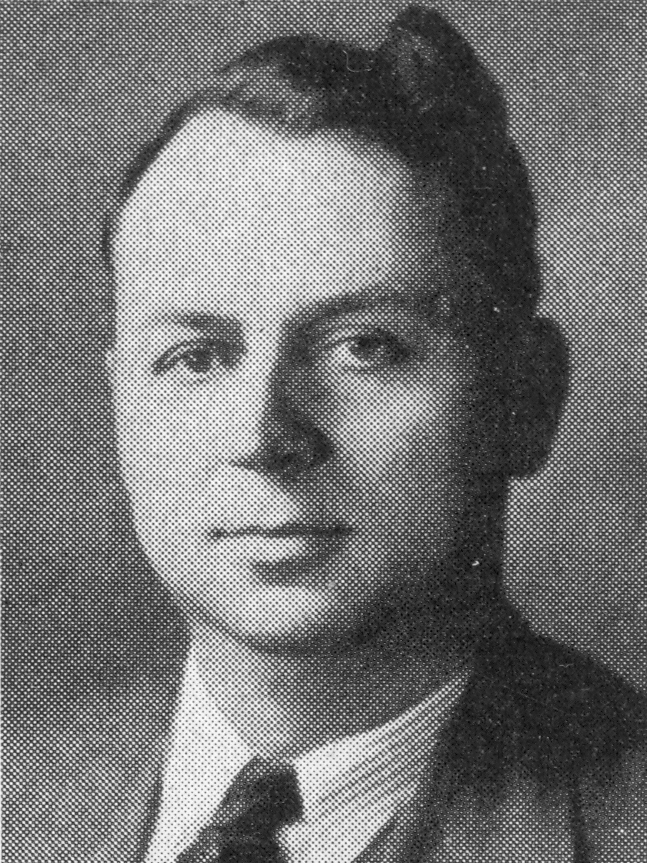
Fowell circa 1940

Charles W. Fowell, Jr. was a member of the Wisconsin State Assembly.

== Biography ==
Fowell was born on May 7, 1901, in Richland County, Wisconsin. He died on December 6, 1973, and is buried in Viroqua, Wisconsin.

== Career ==
Fowell was a member of the Assembly from 1939 to 1942. Previously, he was Sheriff of Vernon County, Wisconsin. He was a Republican.
