= Herman B. Wegner =

American politician

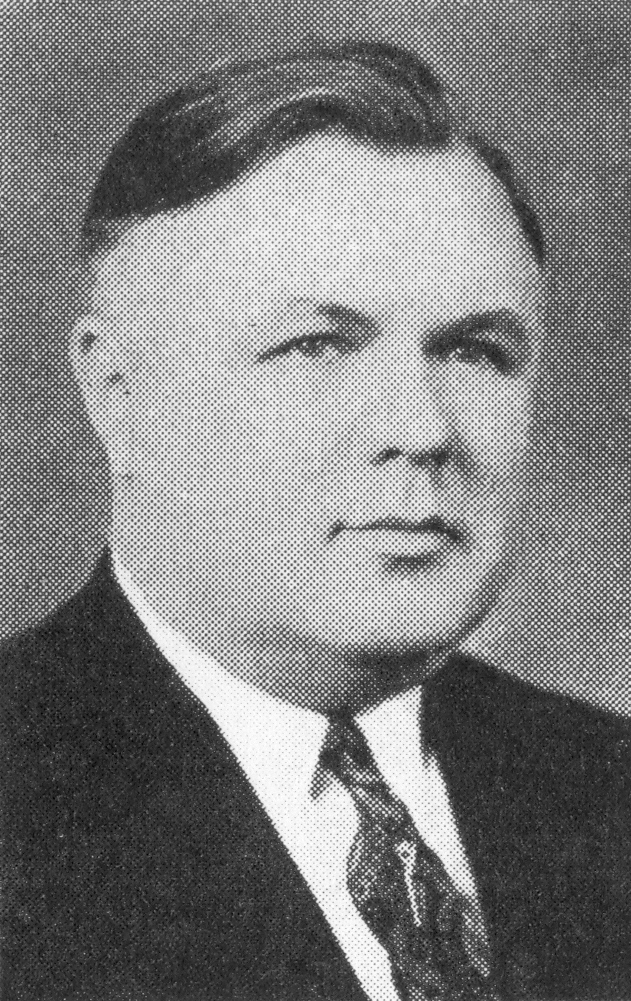
Wegner c. 1940

Herman B. Wegner (January 3, 1891 - February 26, 1964) was a member of the Wisconsin State Assembly.

== Biography ==
Wegner was born on January 3, 1891, in Milwaukee, Wisconsin. He made his living as a shoe and leather cutter and as a coal salesman.

== Political career ==
Wegner was a member of the Assembly from 1933 to 1944. Originally a member of the Socialist Party of America, he later became affiliated with the Wisconsin Progressive Party.
