= Edward L. Graf =

American politician

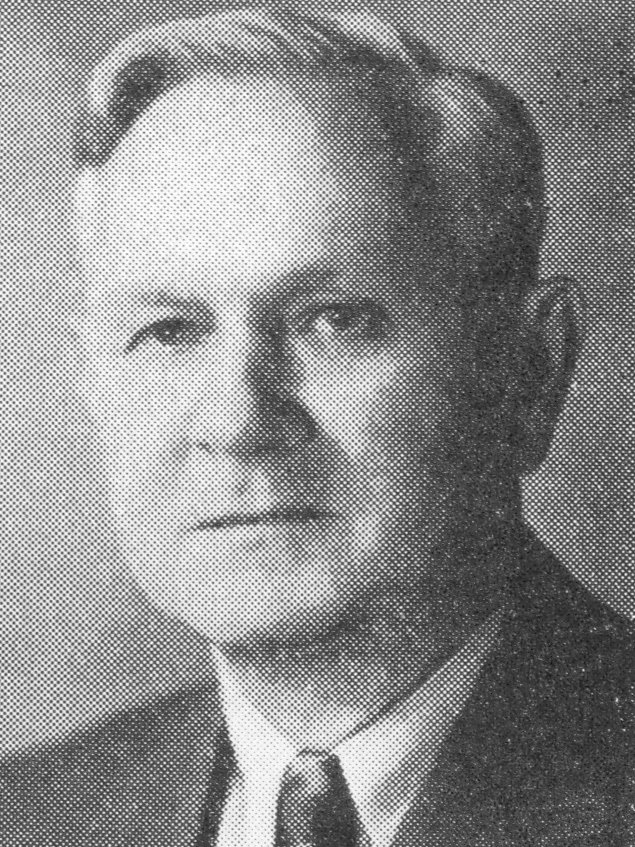
Graf circa 1940

Edward Louis Graf (January 17, 1878 – September 14, 1965) was an American accountant and member of the Wisconsin State Assembly. He later resided in Milwaukee, Wisconsin.

Graf was a member of the Assembly from 1939 to 1948. He was a Republican.

Graf was born in Fredonia, Wisconsin, the son of German immigrant Johann "John" Christian Graf (of Ölbronn-Dürrn, Baden-Württemberg) and German-American Katharina Grüneisen. His father was a farmer. Graf married Clara Benson in 1923.

Graf died in Milwaukee after a stroke, aged 87.
