= Peter A. Hemmy =

American politician

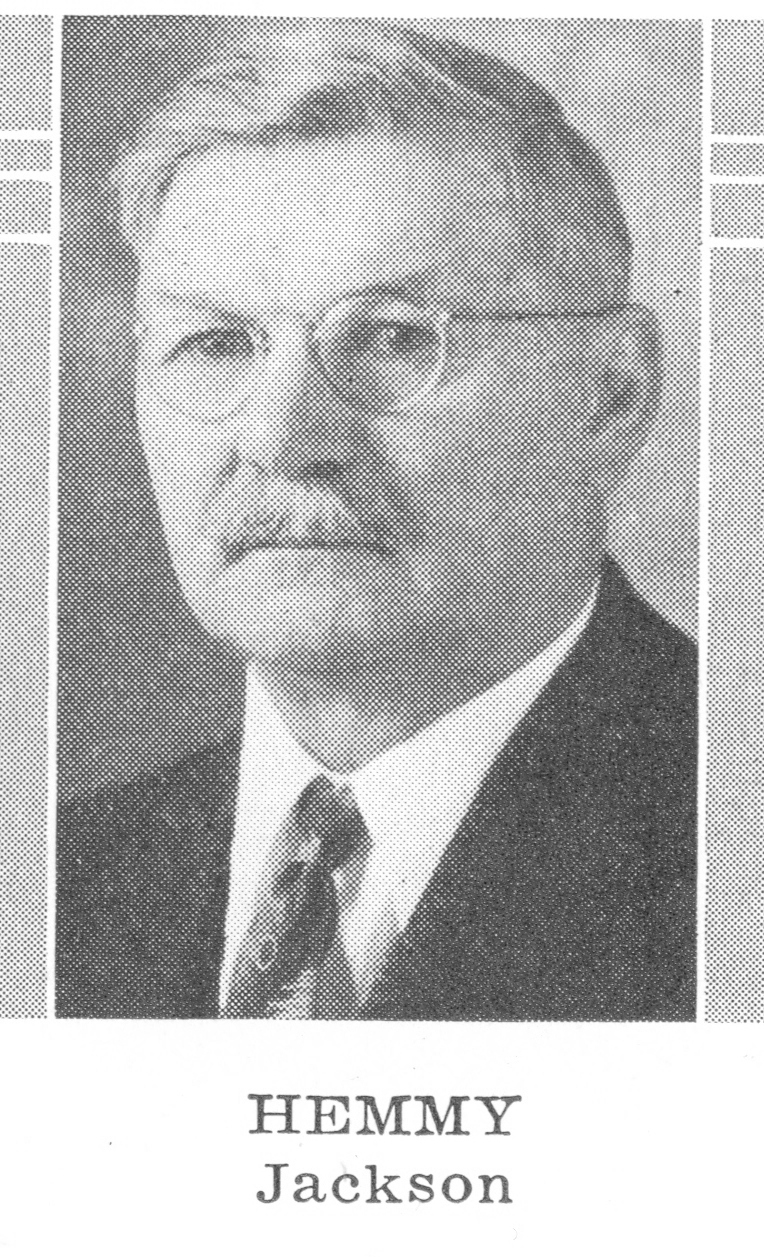
Peter A. Hemmy

Peter A. Hemmy (March 22, 1875 – April 24, 1965) was a member of the Wisconsin State Assembly.

== Biography ==
Hemmy was born in Honey Creek, Sauk County, Wisconsin. He attended high school in Prairie du Sac, Wisconsin, after which he was a schoolteacher and also a semi-professional baseball player. He married Emma Zerbel in 1897. He lived in Humbird, Wisconsin from 1947 to 1964. He died in Mondovi, Wisconsin.

== Career ==
Hemmy was a member of the Assembly twice: first from 1917 to 1918 and second from 1935 to 1940 as a member of the Wisconsin Progressive Party. Additionally, he was town clerk of Prairie du Sac, as well as town clerk, assessor and supervisor of Alma, Jackson County, Wisconsin and a member of the Jackson County, Wisconsin Board.
