= John W. Grobschmidt =

American businessman and politician

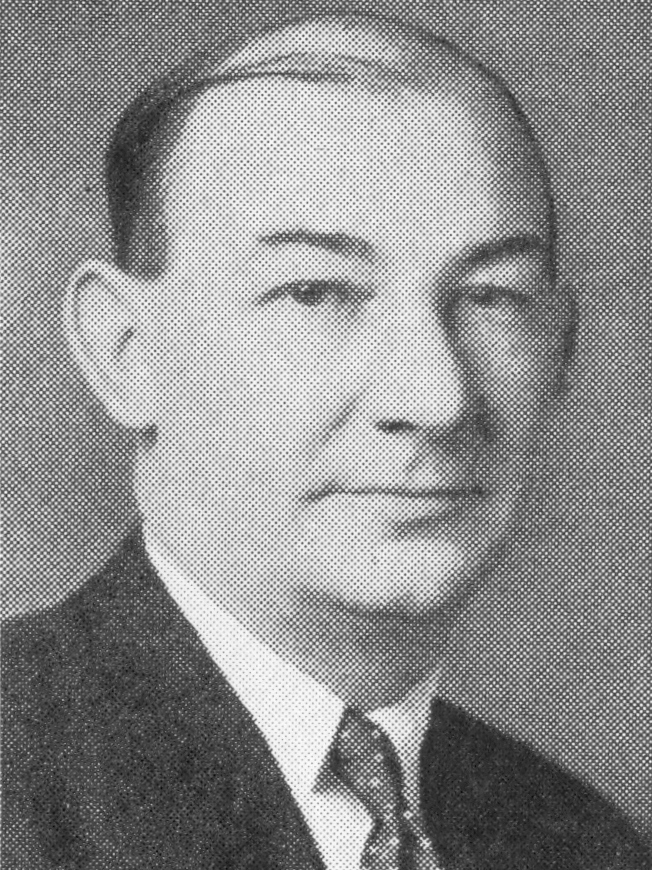
Grobschmidt circa 1939

John William Grobschmidt (January 3, 1896 – September 6, 1939) was an American businessman and politician. He was a member of the Wisconsin State Assembly.

== Biography ==
Born in South Milwaukee, Wisconsin, Grobschmidt went to South Milwaukee High School and Marquette Academy. He was in the insurance business. He was involved in the Republican Party and served on the Milwaukee County, Wisconsin Republican Committee. Grobschmidt served in the Wisconsin State Assembly on the Wisconsin Progressive Party ticket from 1929 until his death from a stroke in Milwaukee, Wisconsin on September 6, 1939.
