= William F. Double =

American lawyer and politician

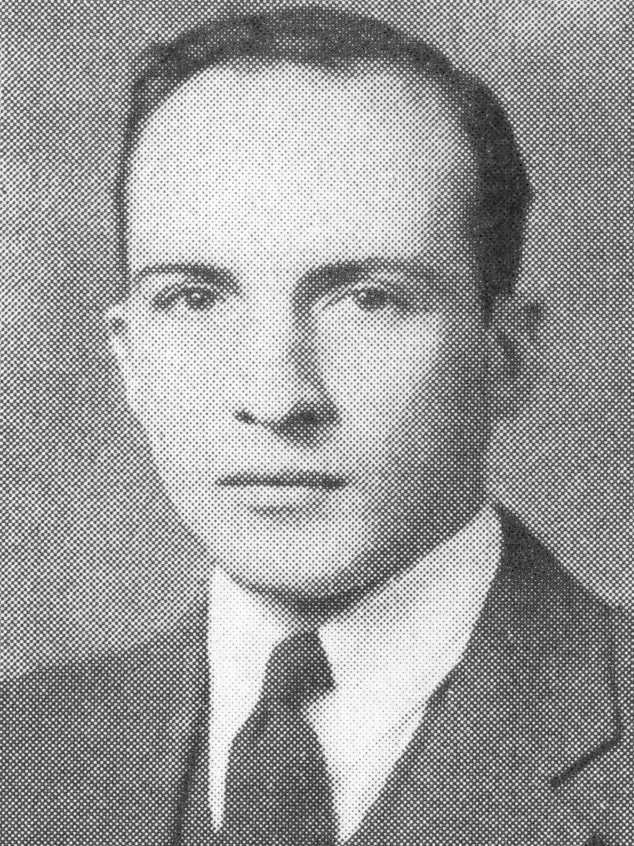
Double circa 1940

William F. Double (June 10, 1910 – December 28, 1996) was an American lawyer and politician.

Born in Milwaukee, Wisconsin, Double went to Ripon College, Marquette University, and received his law degree from Marquette University Law School. Double served in the Wisconsin National Guard and the Temporary Coast Guard Reserve. Double practiced law, worked as a lobbyist, and was involved with the banking business. Double served in the Wisconsin State Assembly from 1939 to 1944 and was a Republican. Double died in Mequon, Wisconsin.
