= Carl J. Peik =

American politician

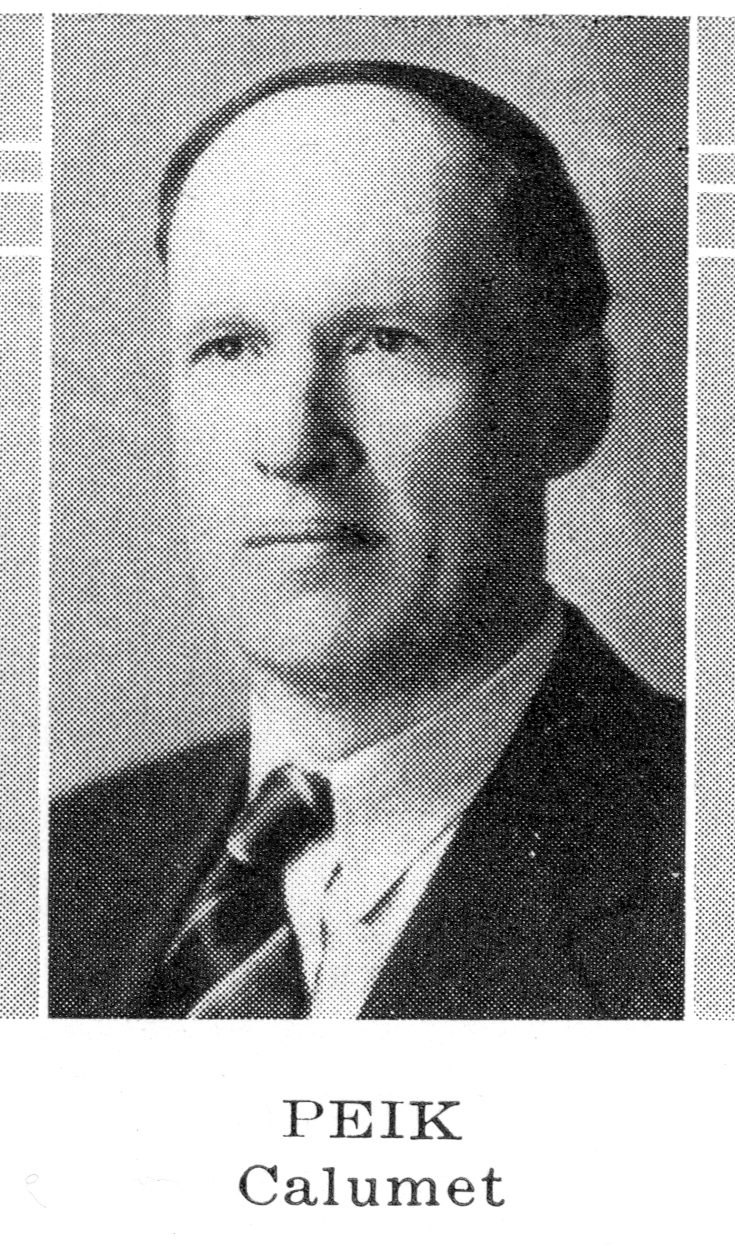
Carl J. Peik

Carl J. Peik (March 27, 1896 – December 2, 1993) was a member of the Wisconsin State Assembly.

== Biography ==
Peik was born in Charlestown, Wisconsin. He attended high school in Chilton, Wisconsin before graduating from the University of Wisconsin-Madison in 1917. He died on December 2, 1993.

== Career ==
Peik was a member of the Assembly from 1939 to 1940. Additionally, he was Supervisor of Charlestown from 1932 to 1939. He was a member of the Wisconsin Progressive Party.
