= Arthur D. Kelly =

American politician

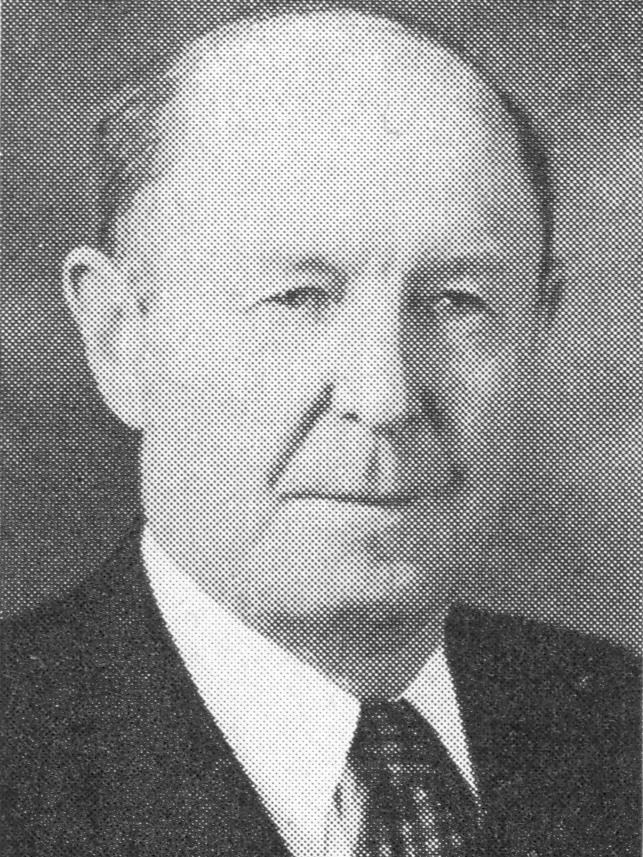
Kelly circa 1939

Arthur D. Kelly (June 9, 1873 in St. Croix County, Wisconsin – September 25, 1939), was a member of the Wisconsin State Assembly. He graduated from Hudson High School in Hudson, Wisconsin in 1892. Kelly was a farmer and livestock dealer.

== Career ==
Kelly was a member of the Assembly from 1933 until his death. Additionally, he was Chairman of Hudson and of the St. Croix County Board. He was affiliated with the Republican Party and the Wisconsin Progressive Party.
