= Alfred C. Grosvenor =

American politician (1888–1953)

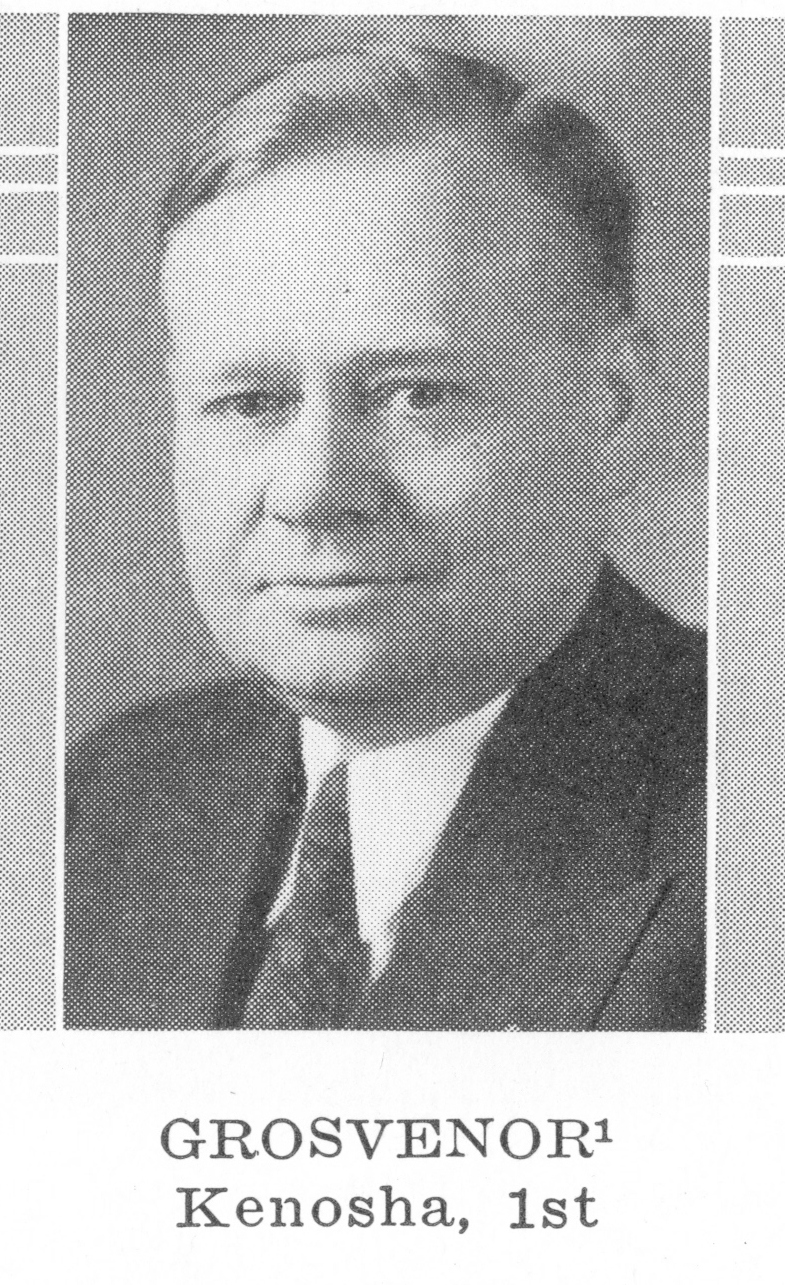
Alfred C. Grosvenor

Alfred Charles Grosvenor (September 8, 1888 – May 27, 1953) was a member of the Wisconsin State Assembly.

== Biography ==
Grosvenor was born on September 8, 1888, in Kenosha, Wisconsin. He graduated from Kenosha High School. During World War I, Grosvenor served in the United States Army in France. He died of a heart attack while golfing on May 27, 1953 and is buried at Saint James Cemetery in Kenosha.

== Political career ==
Grosvenor was a member of the Kenosha Common Council from 1921 to 1922. From 1923 to 1933, he was a member of the Kenosha County, Wisconsin Board, serving as its Chairman from 1927 to 1929. He was a member of the assembly from 1933 until his resignation in 1939. He was serving as the Kenosha postmaster at the time of his death. He was a Democrat.
