= Martin H. Herzog =

American politician

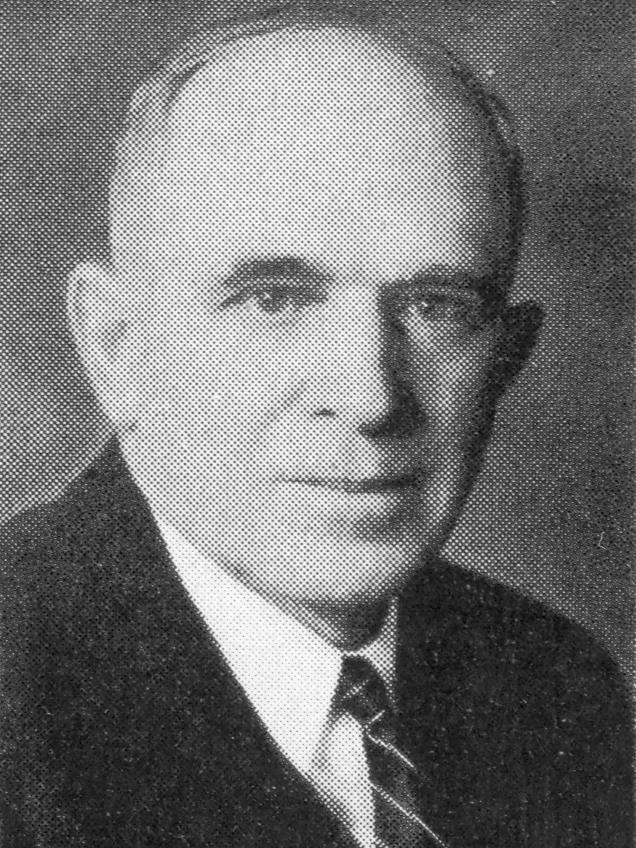
Herzog circa 1940

Martin H. Herzog (September 13, 1878 – May 24, 1971) was a member of the Wisconsin State Assembly from 1939 to 1940. He was a member of the Wisconsin Progressive Party.

Born in Mount Pleasant, Wisconsin, Herzog went to Patterson Commercial College in Racine, Wisconsin and was a farmer. He served on the Mount Pleasant town board and was the chairman. He also served as town treasurer. He then moved to Sturtevant, Wisconsin and served on the village board and was president. Herzog served on the Racine County, Wisconsin Board of Supervisors and was Racine County sheriff. Herzog died on May 24, 1971.
