= Ben G. Slater =

American politician

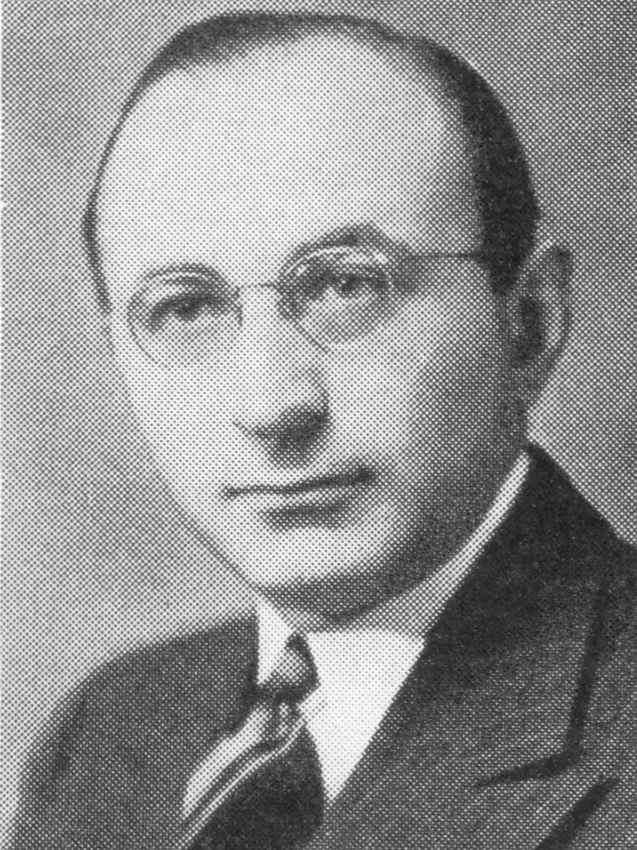
Slater during his time as a member of the Wisconsin State Assembly

Ben G. Slater was a member of the Wisconsin State Assembly.

== Biography ==
Slater was born on September 26, 1907, in Milwaukee, Wisconsin. In 1930, he graduated from Marquette University Law School and then practiced law. He died on August 2, 1998.

== Career ==
Slater was a member of the Assembly from 1939 to 1940. Additionally, he was Honorary Sergeant-at-Arms of the 1936 Republican National Convention.
