= James S. Mace =

American politician

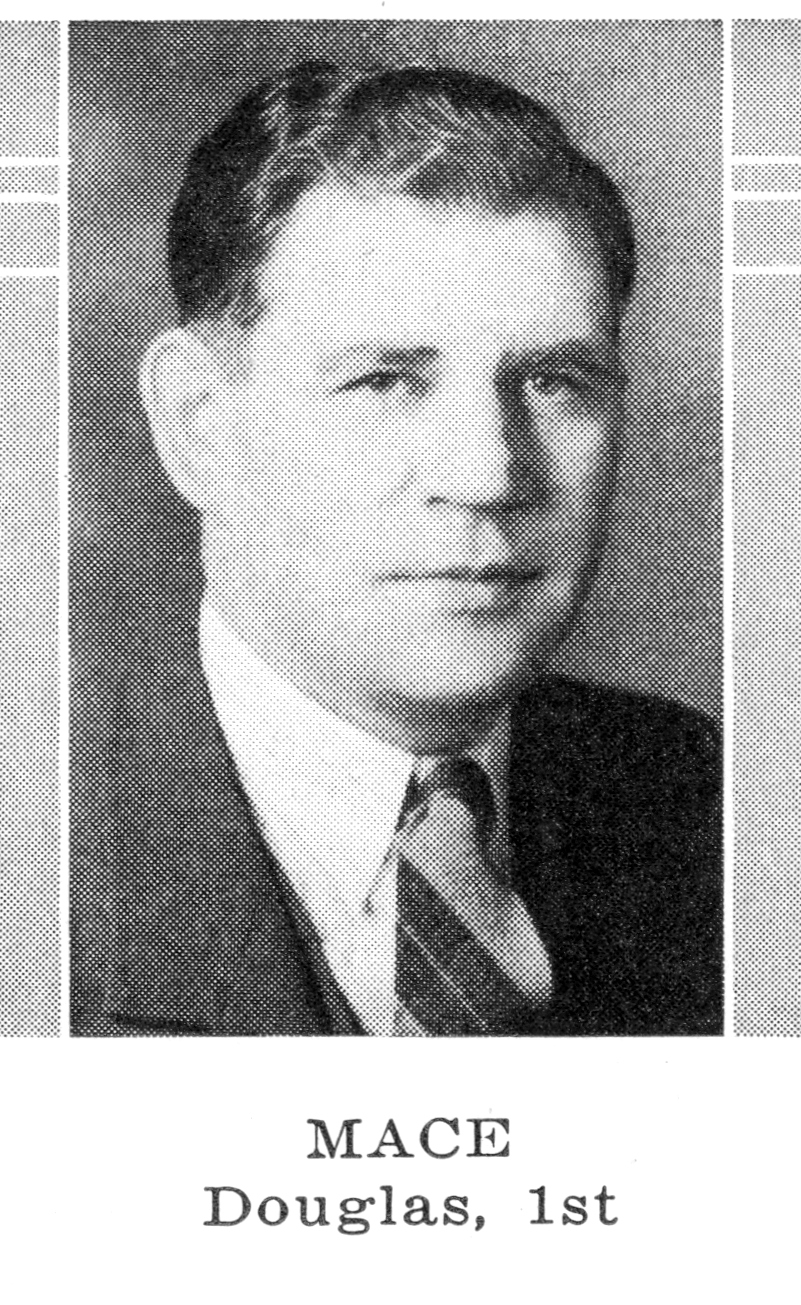
James S. Mace

James S. Mace was a member of the Wisconsin State Assembly.

== Biography ==
Mace was born in Cleveland, Ohio. He eventually became a switchman and switch foreman on the Great Northern Railway and settled in Superior, Wisconsin.

== Political career ==
Mace was a member of the Assembly from 1939 to 1940. Additionally, he was a member of the Douglas County, Wisconsin Board. He was a member of the Wisconsin Progressive Party.
