= Oscar S. Paulson =

20th century American minister and politician

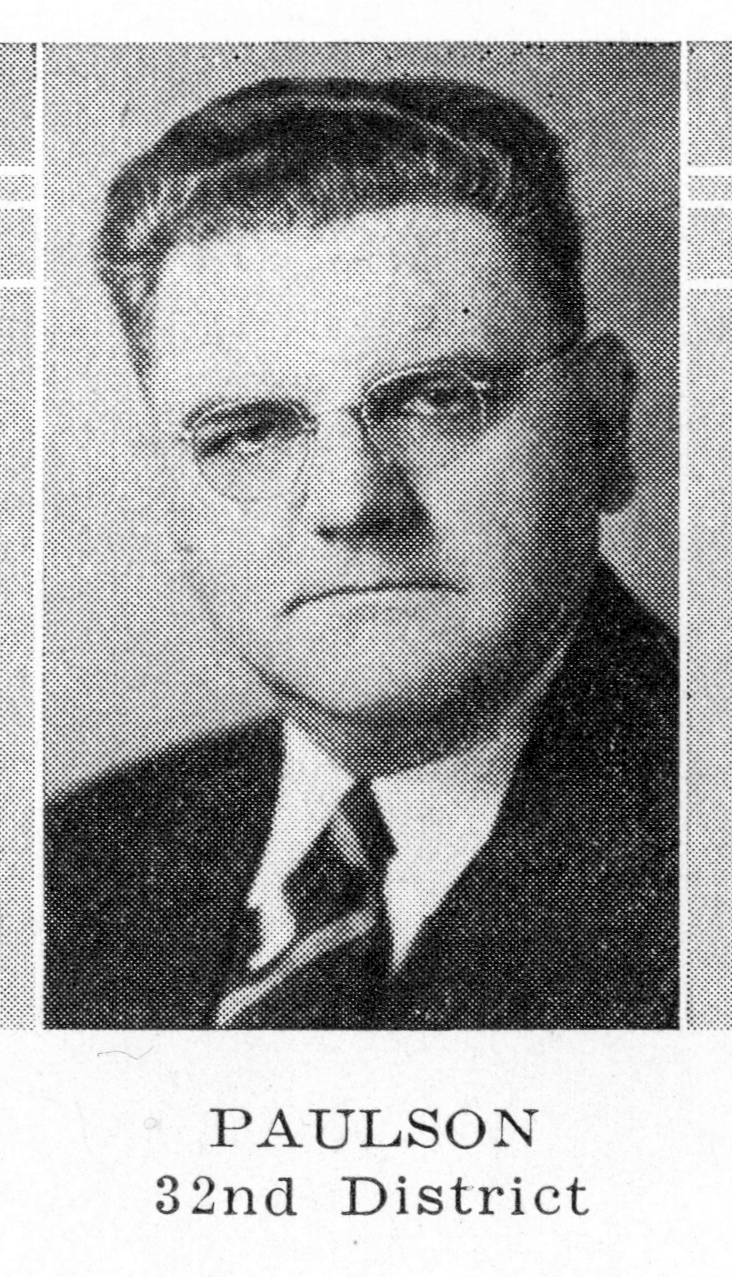
Oscar S. Paulson

Oscar S. Paulson (December 12, 1889 – February 7, 1952) was an American Lutheran minister who served in the Wisconsin Senate.

== Biography ==
Paulson was born near Dalton in Otter Tail County, Minnesota. Paulson graduated from Augsburg College and was ordained in the Lutheran ministry, He became a Lutheran pastor in La Crosse, Wisconsin in 1916. In 1930, he became President of the Minneapolis District of the Lutheran Free Church.

== Political career ==
Paulson was a member of the Senate from 1937 to 1940. He was a member of the Wisconsin Progressive Party.
