= Glenn H. James =

American politician

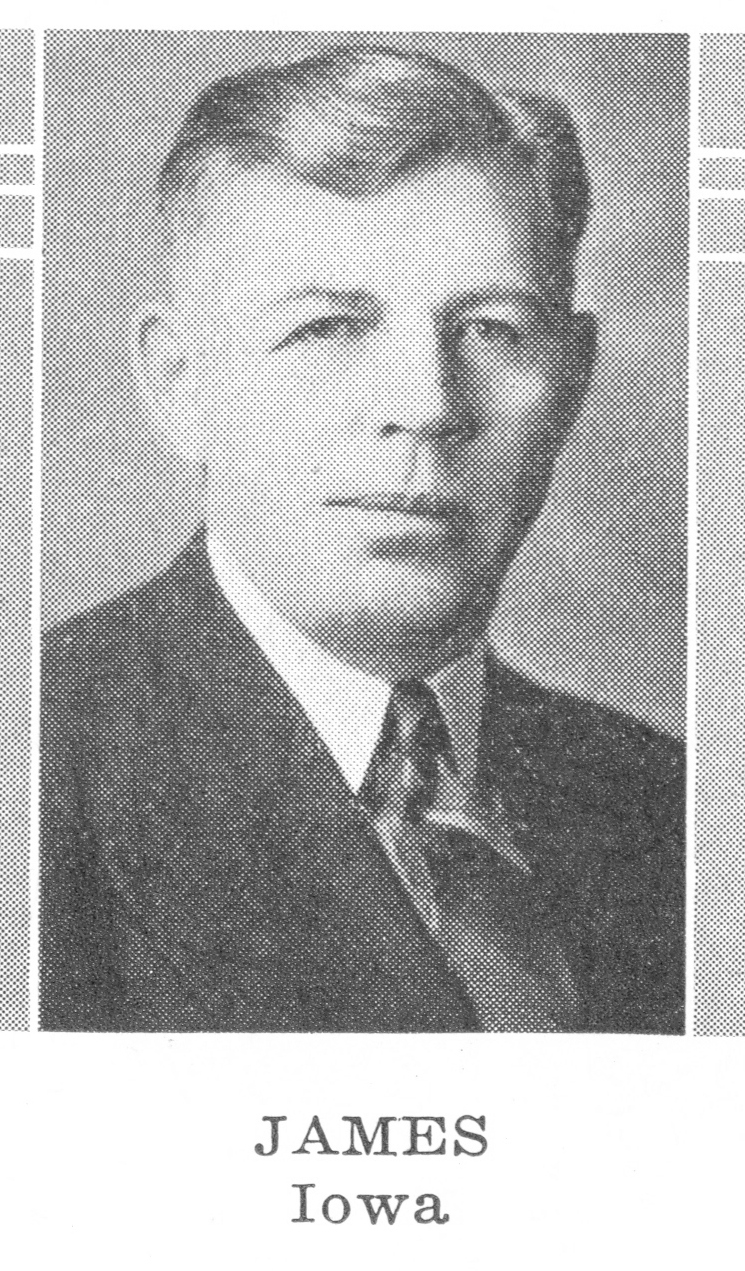
Glenn H. James

Glenn H. James (April 19, 1890 – February 1, 1962) was a member of the Wisconsin State Assembly.

== Biography ==
James was born on April 19, 1890, in Montfort, Wisconsin. James was a farmer. He served on the Montfort town board and was chairman. James also served on the school board as a clerk. He graduated from high school in 1906. James died of a stroke on February 1, 1962, in a Dodgeville, Wisconsin, hospital.

== Career ==
James was a member of the Assembly twice: first from 1939 to 1942, and again from 1945 to 1946. In addition, he was Chairman of Eden, Iowa County, Wisconsin. He was a Republican.
