= Joseph A. Schmitz =

American politician (1898–1994)

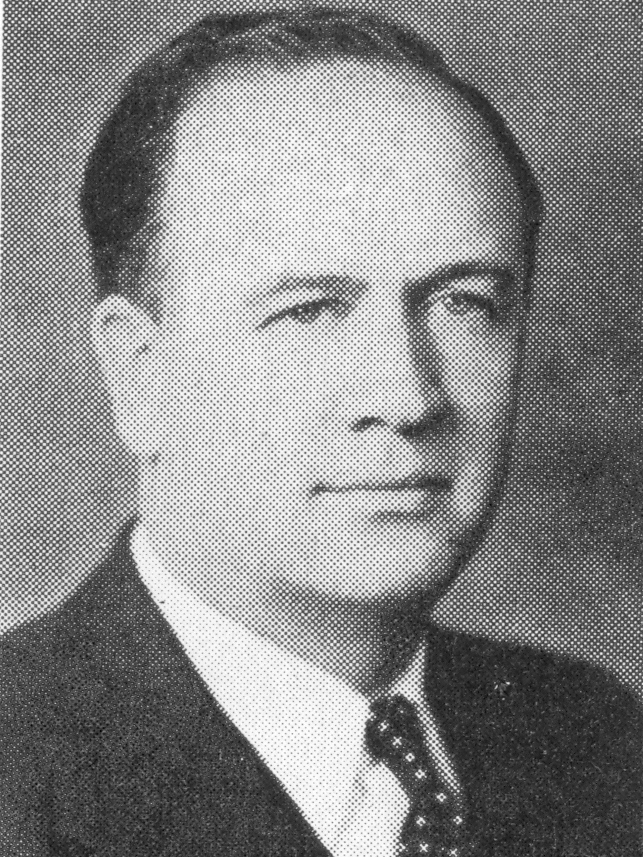
Schmitz circa 1940

Joseph A. Schmitz was an American politician. He was a member of the Wisconsin State Assembly.

== Biography ==
Schmitz was born on July 5, 1898, in Milwaukee, Wisconsin. He died on February 9, 1994.

== Career ==
Schmitz was a member of the Assembly during the 1939, 1941 and 1943 sessions. Additionally, he was a justice of the peace. He was a Republican.
