= Frank Weinheimer =

American politician and printer

Frank Weinheimer (born February 1, 1887) was an American politician and printer.

Born in Milwaukee, Wisconsin, Weinheimer worked in a printing company. He was involved with the Pressman's Union and the American Federation of Labor. He then worked as a salesman for E. J. Kelly and Company since 1940. In 1941, Weinheimer served in the Wisconsin State Assembly and was a Progressive.
