= Schlatter =

Schlatter is a surname. Notable people with the surname include:

- Adolf Schlatter (1852–1938), German evangelical theologian and professor
- Carl B. Schlatter (1864–1934), Swiss surgeon after whom Osgood–Schlatter disease is named
- Charlie Schlatter (born 1966), American actor
- Daniela Schlatter (born 1994), Swiss long jumper
- Dustin Schlatter, American wrestler
- Francis Schlatter (1856–1896), Alsatian cobbler who, because of miraculous cures attributed to him, became known as the Healer
- George Schlatter (born 1929), American television producer and director
- Michael Schlatter (1716–1790), German Reformed minister who worked in the US
- Peter Schlatter (born 1968), German judoka

== See also ==
- Osgood–Schlatter disease, inflammation of the growth plate at the tibial tuberosity
