= Harry P. Van Guilder =

American politician

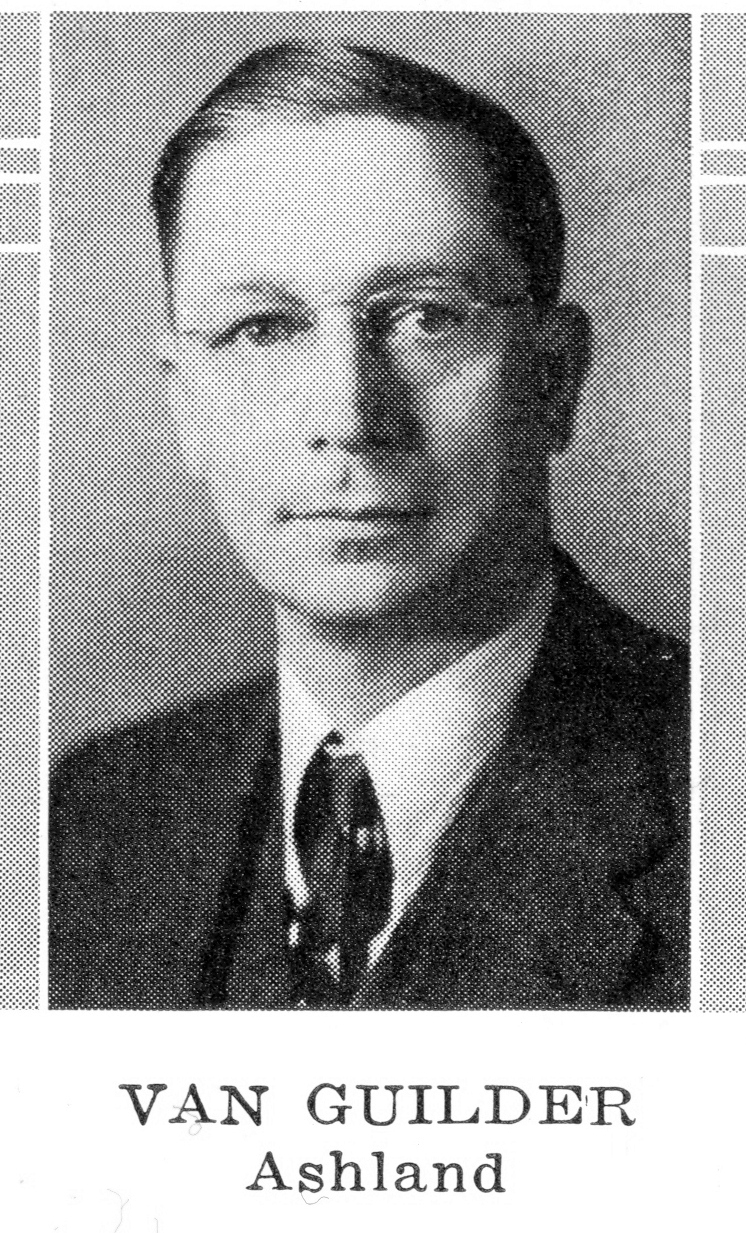
Harry Van Guilder

Harry P. Van Guilder (July 6, 1890 – November 23, 1979) was a member of the Wisconsin State Assembly.

== Biography ==
Van Guilder was born on July 6, 1890, in Cannon Falls, Minnesota. Later, he moved to Ashland, Wisconsin, and married Mary Eileen Habelt. He died on November 23, 1979.

== Career ==
Van Guilder was a member of the Assembly from 1937 to 1942. In 1944, he was a candidate for the United States House of Representatives from Wisconsin's 10th congressional district. He lost to incumbent Alvin O'Konski. Van Guilder was a member of the Wisconsin Progressive Party.
