= Reno W. Trego =

Member of Wisconsin State Assembly

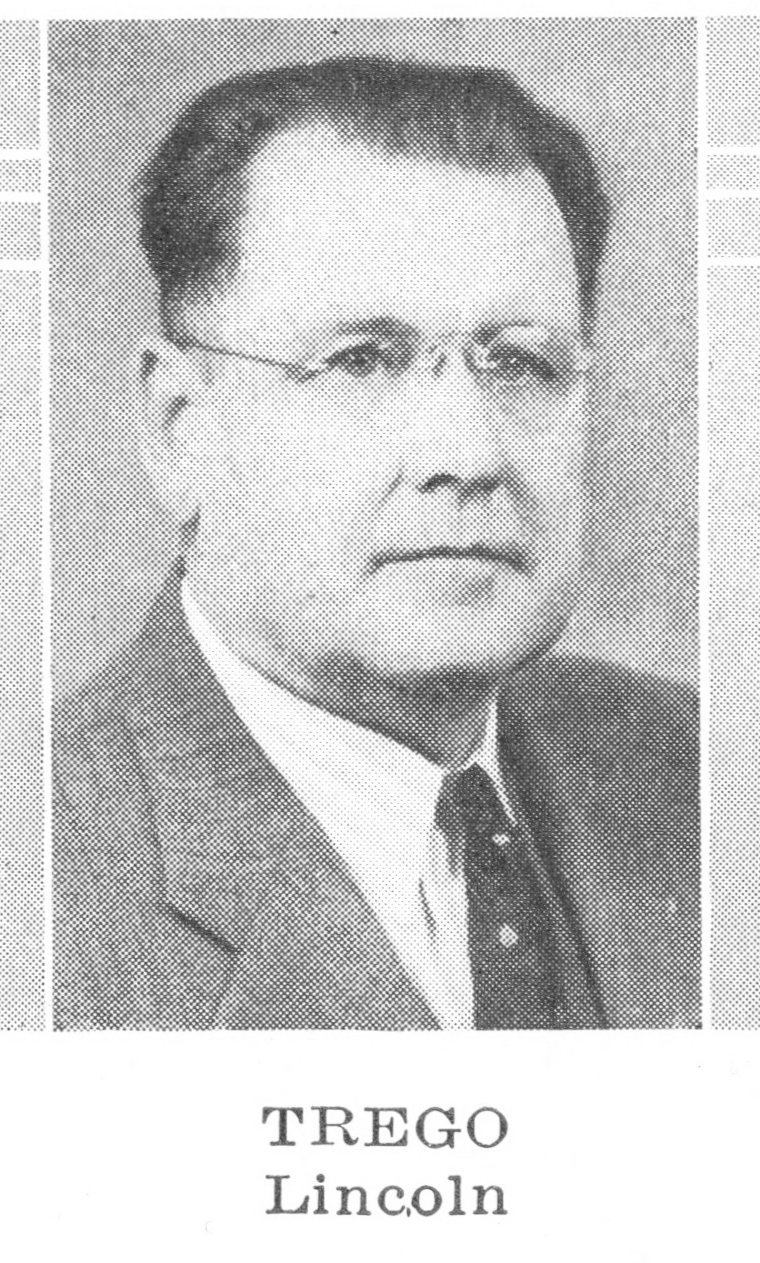
Reno W. Trego

Reno W. Trego was a member of the Wisconsin State Assembly.

== Biography ==
Trego was born on August 24, 1877, in Benton County, Iowa. From 1898 to 1901, Trego was a member of the Iowa National Guard. On August 15, 1911, he married Sevilla Ridenour. Trego moved to Wood County, Wisconsin in 1918 and to Merrill, Wisconsin in 1923. He died on November 3, 1961, in Wausau, Wisconsin and is buried in Garrison, Iowa.

== Political career ==
Trego was a member of the Assembly from 1937 to 1940. He was a member of the Wisconsin Progressive Party.
