= Arthur E. Austin =

American politician

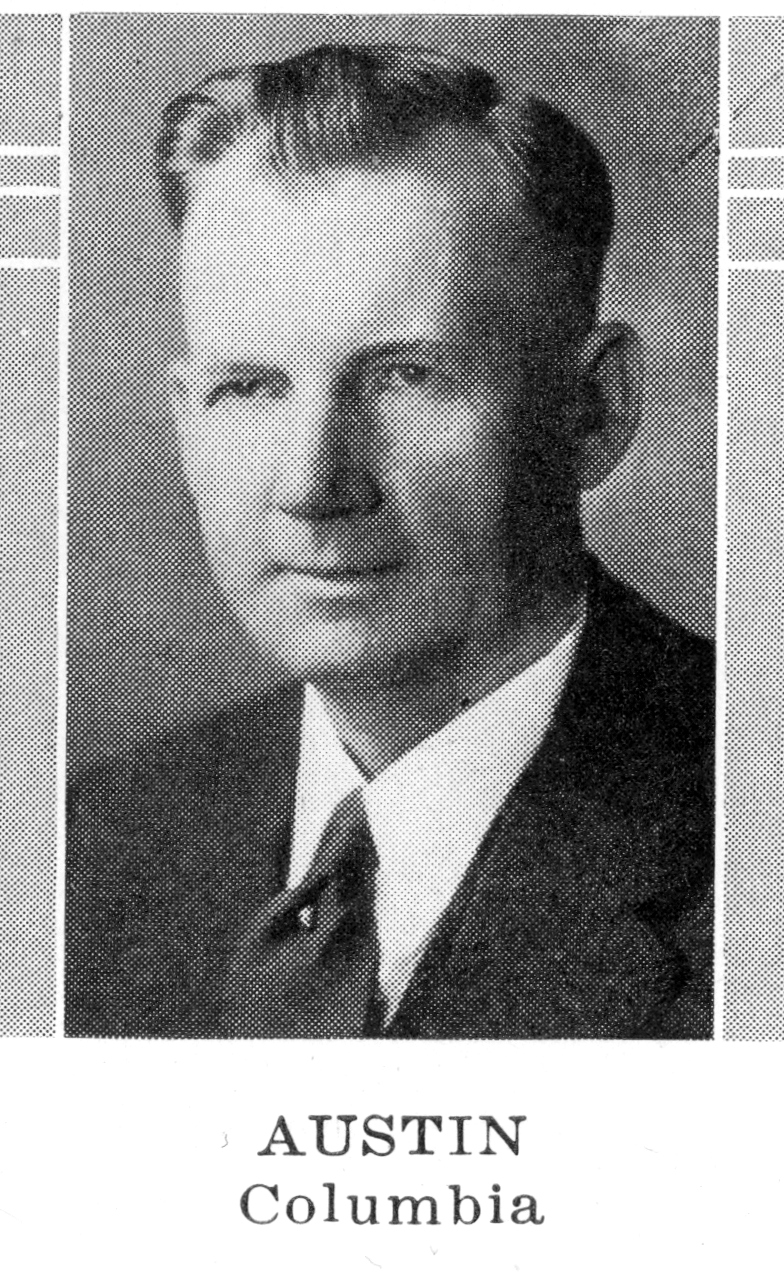
Arthur E. Austin

Arthur E. "Doc" Austin (January 22, 1891 – December 1, 1976) was a member of the Wisconsin State Assembly.

== Biography ==
Austin was born on January 22, 1891, in Lowville, Wisconsin. He married Ethel Mae Cheney (1893–1987) in 1925. He died in 1976 in a Madison hospital.

== Career ==
Austin was a member of the Assembly from 1939 to 1946. He was a Republican.
