= Valentine P. Rath =

American politician

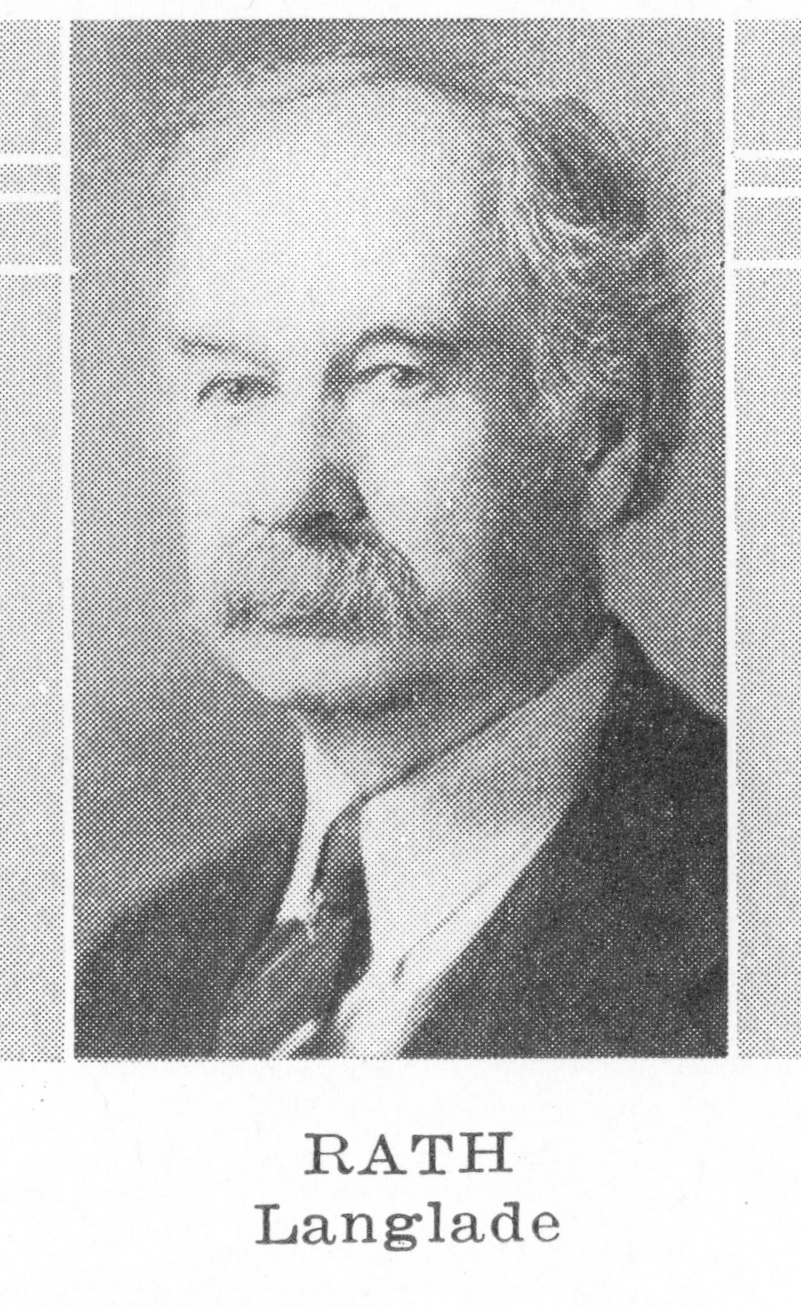

Member of the Wisconsin State Assembly from the unknown district
- In office 1903–1924
- In office 1933–1938

Personal details
- Born: February 15, 1860 Sheboygan, Wisconsin
- Died: February 25, 1941 (aged 81) Madison, Wisconsin
- Party: Democrat

Valentine P. Rath (February 15, 1860 - February 25, 1941) was a member of the Wisconsin State Assembly.

== Biography ==
Rath was born on February 15, 1860, in Sheboygan, Wisconsin. Later, he moved to Price, Wisconsin. He was a member of the Knights of Columbus.

On May 15, 1890, Rath married Madelen Mary Friederich. They would have six children, four of whom would serve in World War I.

He died on February 25, 1941.

== Career ==
Rath was a member of the Assembly twice. First, from 1903 to 1924 and second, from 1933 to 1938. Additionally, he was Chairman, Assessor and Clerk of Price and Clerk of Langlade County, Wisconsin. He was a Democrat.
