= Earl W. Hanson =

American banker and politician

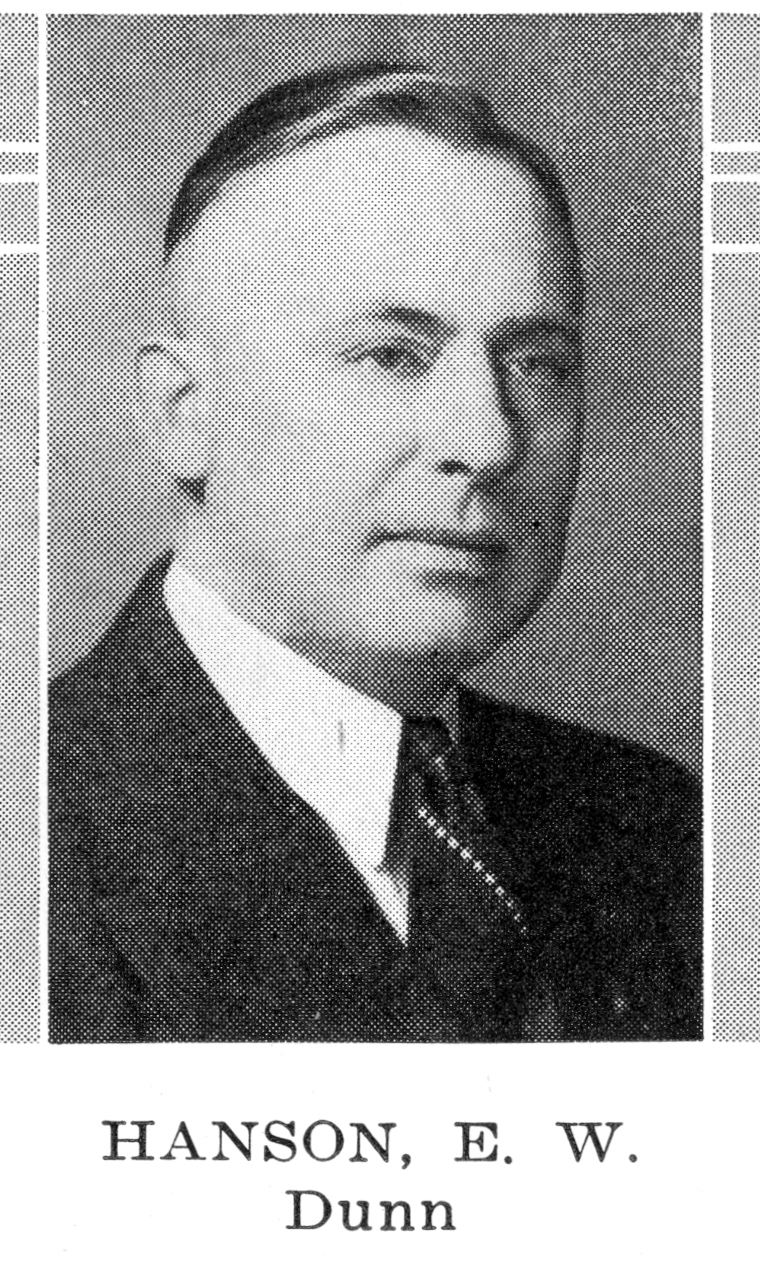
Earl W. Hanson

Earl W. Hanson (October 17, 1888 – December 22, 1950) was an American banker and member of the Wisconsin State Assembly.

== Biography ==
Hanson was born in Elk Mound, Wisconsin. He was the son of Nels Hanson (1842-1924) and Marie (Christopherson) Hanson (1861-1950). His father was an immigrant from Norway. During World War I, he served in the United States Army. He was employed as cashier of the Bank of Elk Mound.Additionally, he was clerk, trustee and president of Elk Mound and Chairman of the Dunn County, Wisconsin Board.

== Political career ==
Hanson was a Republican. He served as a member of the Wisconsin State Assembly from 1939 until his death in 1950.
