= Claud H. Larsen =

American politician

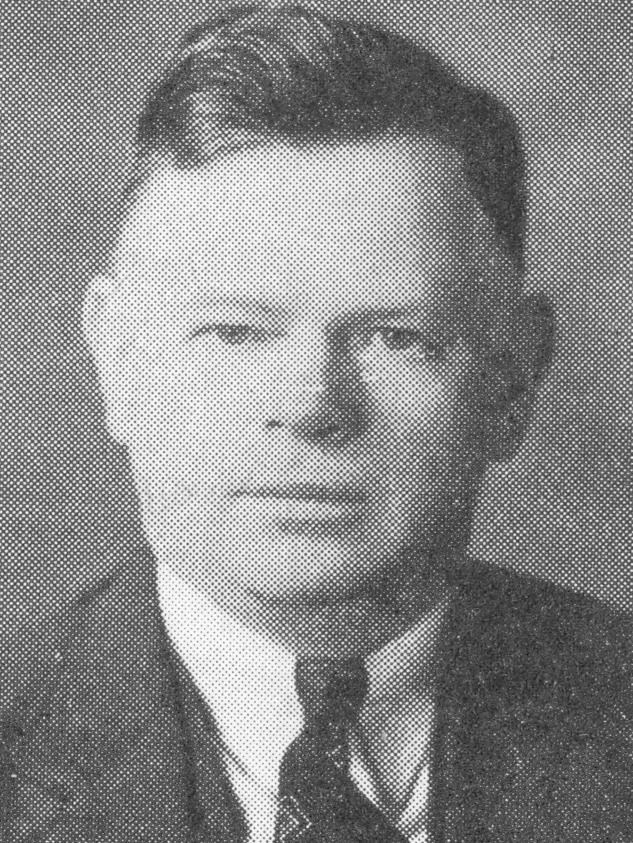
Larsen during his time in the Wisconsin State Assembly

Claud H. Larsen (December 1, 1892 – December 18, 1964) was a member of the Wisconsin State Assembly.

== Biography ==
Larsen was born in Milwaukee, Wisconsin. His parent were both immigrants from Norway. He would work for Nordberg Manufacturing Company. A Lutheran, he was a member of the Knights of Pythias. Larsen died in 1964 and was buried at the Arlington Park Cemetery in Greenfield, Wisconsin.

== Political career ==
Larsen was a member of the Assembly from 1939 to 1940. He was affiliated with the Wisconsin Progressive Party.
