= Benjamin W. Diederich =

American politician

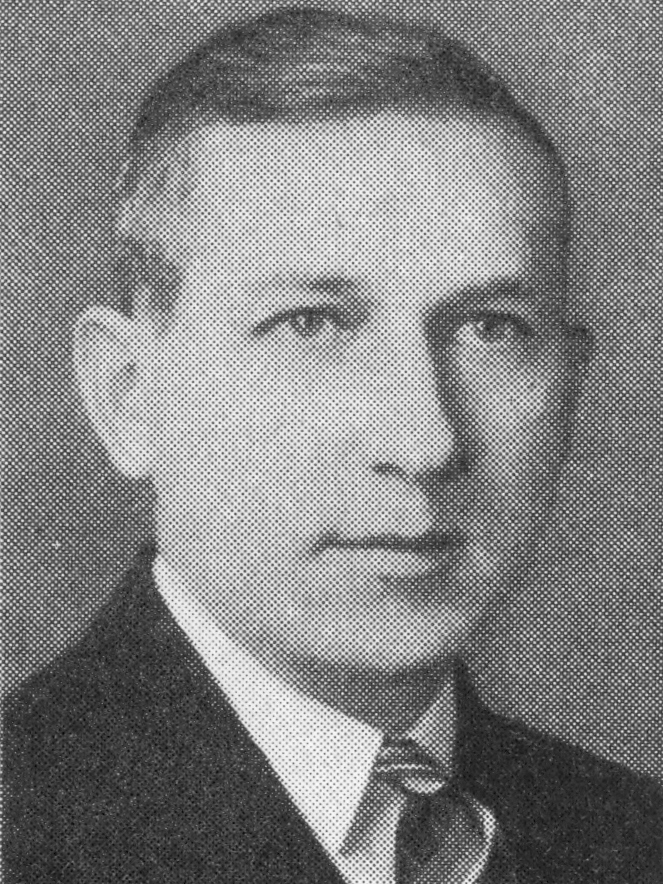
Diederich circa 1940

Benjamin W. Diederich (September 22, 1903, in Manitowoc, Wisconsin – October 12, 1974, in Sheboygan, Wisconsin), was a member of the Wisconsin State Assembly from 1939 to 1940. He attended the University of Wisconsin Law School. He was a Republican.
