= Robert H. Burns =

American politician

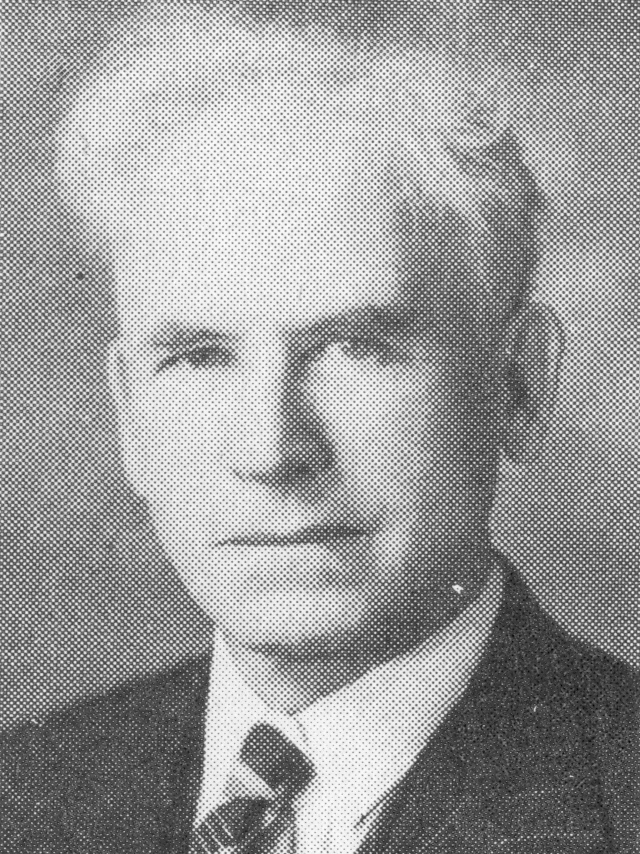
- Burns circa 1940

Member of the Wisconsin State Assembly from the Rusk and Sawyer Counties district
- In office 1939–1942

Personal details
- Born: August 14, 1870 Richland County, WI

Robert H. Burns (born August 14, 1870, in Richland County, Wisconsin) was a member of the Wisconsin State Assembly from 1939 to 1942. Previously, he was Superintendent of Schools of Richland County from 1899 to 1907 and of Rusk County, Wisconsin from 1919 to 1923. He was a Republican.
