= Lyall T. Beggs =

American politician

Lyall T. Beggs (November 9, 1899 – May 14, 1973) was a past commander in chief of the Veterans of Foreign Wars and a member of the Wisconsin State Assembly.

== Life and education ==
Beggs was born in Plainfield, Wisconsin in 1899. He attended Cameron High School. Beggs was a member of the Coast Artillery and he quickly became a non-commissioned officer. Beggs ended his military career in 1919. He returned to Wisconsin where he graduated from the University of Wisconsin–Eau Claire. He went to law school at University of Wisconsin–Madison. His father was Charles A. Beggs who also served in the Wisconsin Assembly. Beggs was an administrator in probate court. Beggs died in Madison, Wisconsin.

== Career ==
Beggs was a justice of the peace from 1927 to 1935. From 1935 to 1939 he served as the Dane County District Attorney. Beggs served in the Wisconsin State Assembly 1941-1947 and was a member of the Wisconsin Progressive Party, serving as the Assembly Floor Leader in 1943 and 1945. Upon the dissolution of the Progressives, he joined the Republican Party and served one term as a member of that party, but was not a candidate for re-election in 1948. In the VFW, Beggs became National Junior Vice Commander then Senior Vice Commander and finally became Commander-In-Chief. In his role as Commander, Beggs also worked as a recruiter with the VFW.
