= Dougald D. Kennedy =

American politician

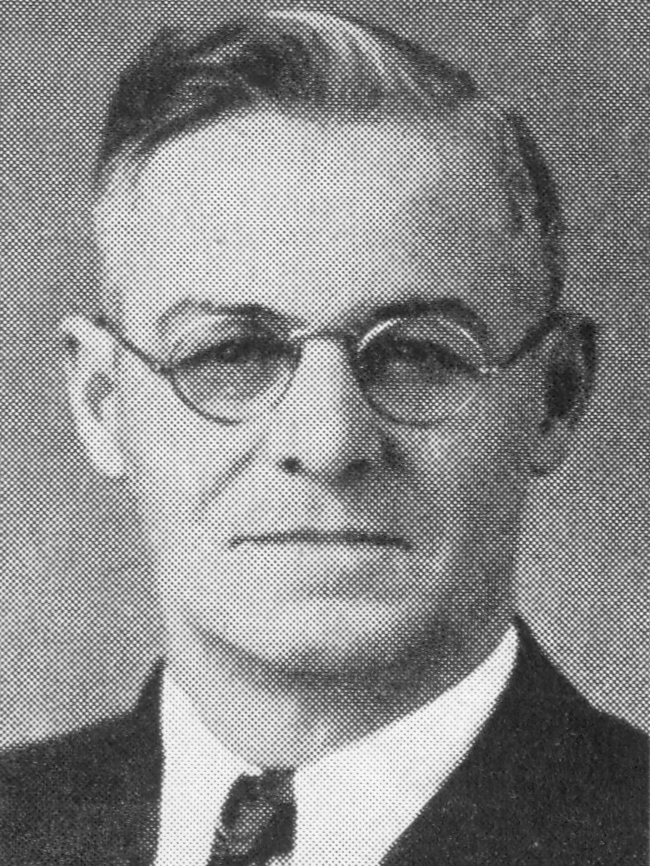
Kennedy circa 1940

Dougald D. Kennedy (1879-1941) from Amery, Wisconsin was a member of the Wisconsin State Assembly.

== Biography ==
Kennedy was born Dougald Duncan Kennedy on November 28, 1879 in Osceola, Wisconsin. He died on April 15, 1941.

== Career ==
Kennedy was a member of the Assembly from 1937 until his death. He was a member of the Wisconsin Progressive Party.
