= John F. Dittbrender =

American farmer and politician

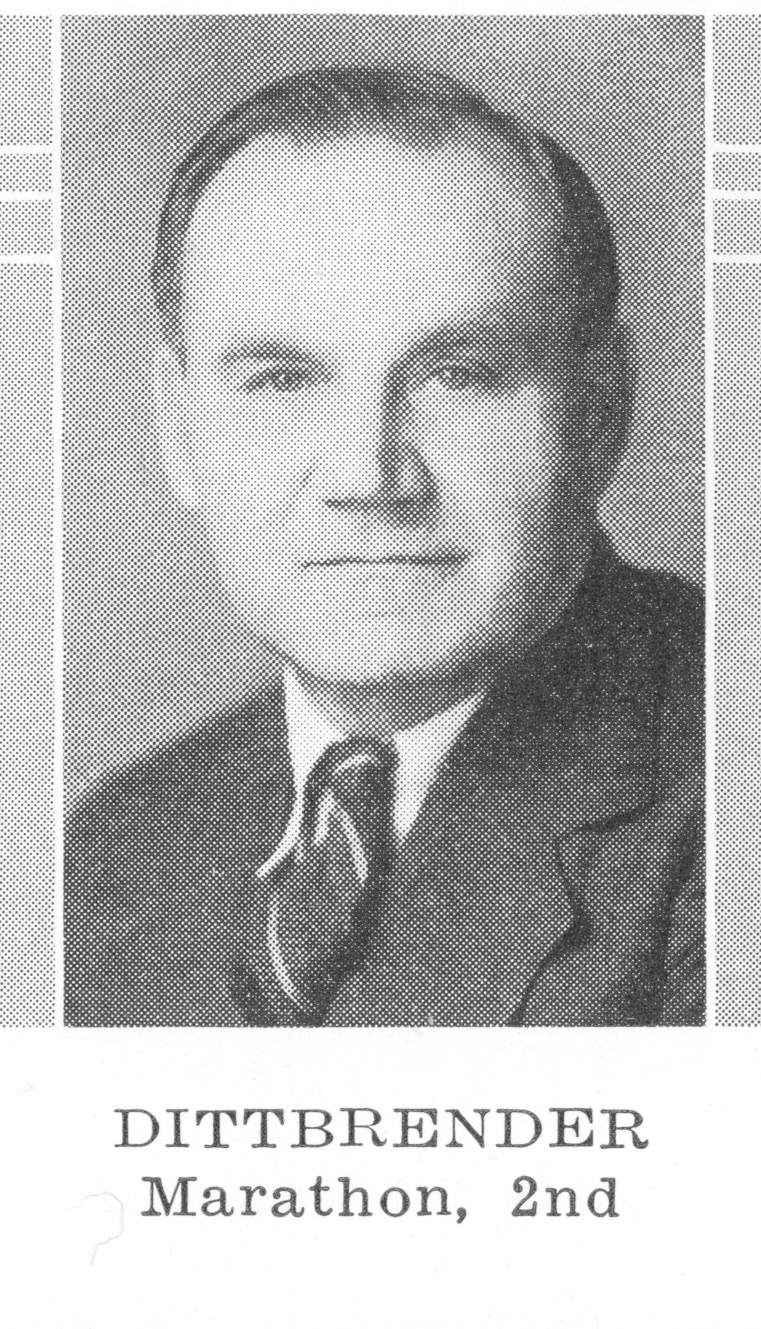
John F. Dittbrender

John Frederick Dittbrender (July 11, 1878 in Theresa, Wisconsin – January 4, 1966) was a farmer. On March 3, 1900, he married Augusta Voeltz. He is buried in Easton, Marathon County, Wisconsin.

== Career ==
Dittbrender was a member of the Assembly from 1939 to 1940. From 1915 to 1939, he had been Chairman of the Town of Ringle, Wisconsin. He was a member of the Wisconsin Progressive Party.
