= Otto A. Vogel =

American politician

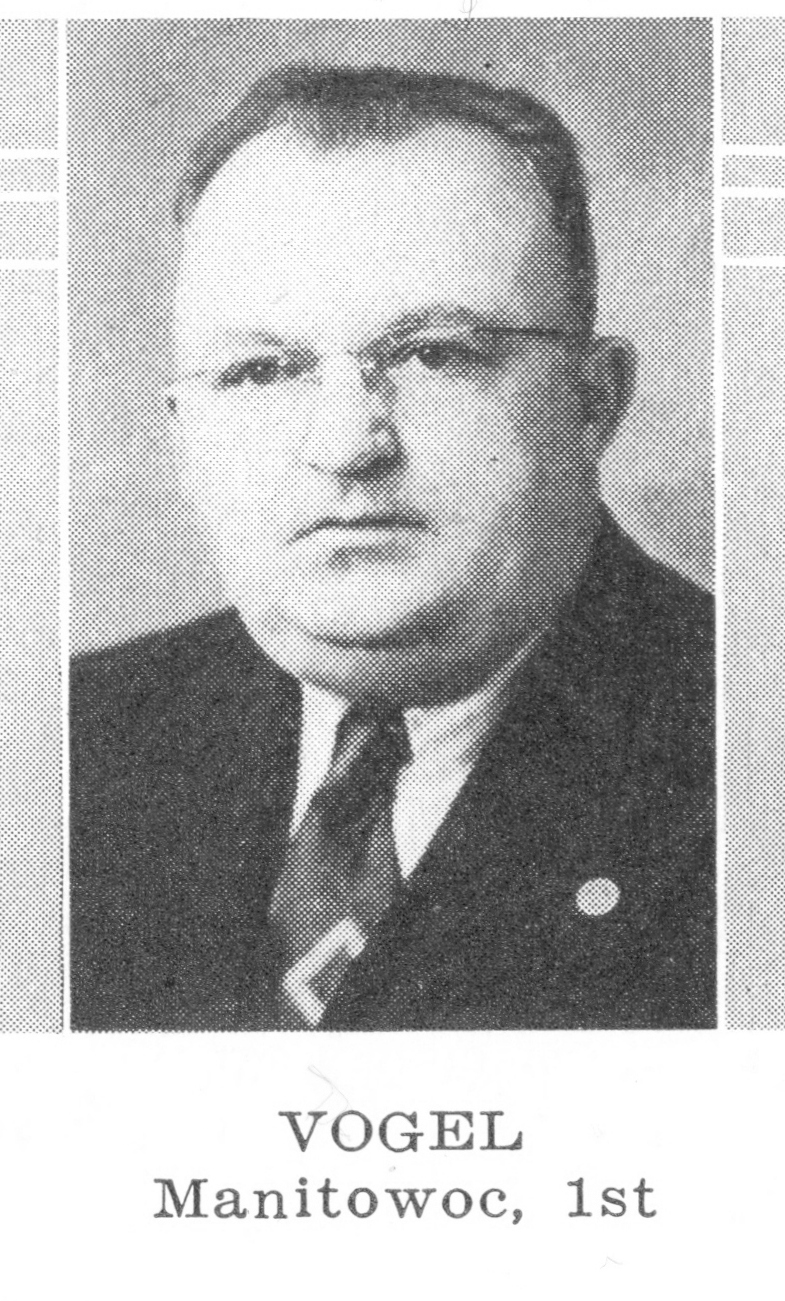
Otto A. Vogel

Otto A. Vogel (October 10, 1886 – September 19, 1951) was a member of the Wisconsin State Assembly.

== Biography ==
Vogel was born on October 10, 1886, in Newton, Manitowoc County, Wisconsin. He died on September 19, 1951, and is buried in Manitowoc, Wisconsin.

== Career ==
Vogel was a member of the Assembly three times. First, from 1935 to 1936, second, from 1939 to 1940 and third, from 1943 to 1948. Additionally, he was a justice of the peace from 1912 to 1918 and a Manitowoc alderman from 1918 to 1930 and again from 1932 to 1934. He was a member of the Wisconsin Progressive Party.
