= Melvin H. Schlytter =

American politician

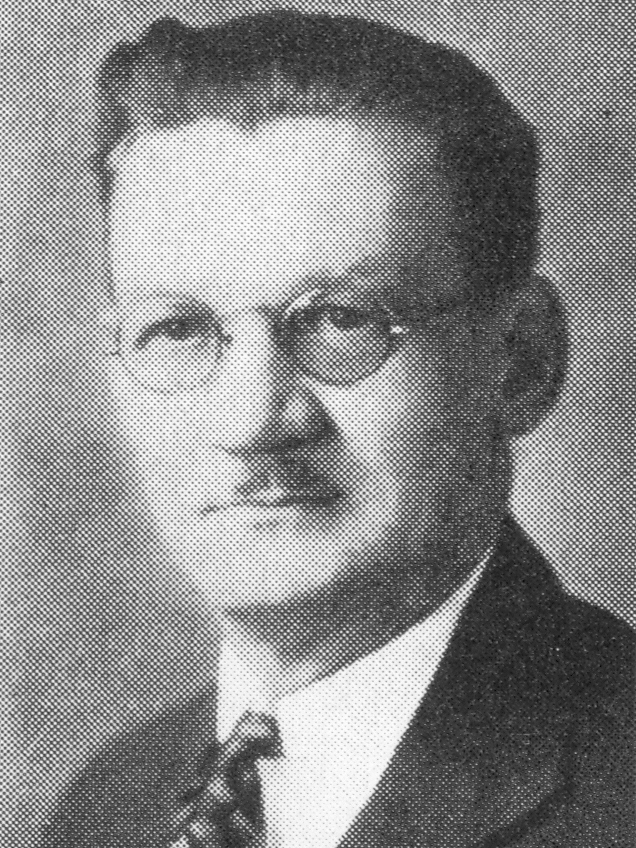
Schlytter circa 1940

Melvin H. Schlytter (October 22, 1890 – July 20, 1959) was a member of the Wisconsin State Assembly.

Schlytter was born Melvin Hjalmar Schlytter October 22, 1890 in Wittenberg, Wisconsin. He attended Lawrence University and served in the United States Army during World War I. Schlytter died on July 20, 1959, in Madison, Wisconsin.

== Political career ==
Schlytter was a member of the Assembly from 1939 to 1940. Additionally, he was a member of the Shawano County, Wisconsin Board. He was a Republican.
