= Wisconsin Progressive Party =

- Leader: Philip La Follette; Robert M. La Follette, Jr.
- Founded: May 19, 1934; 92 years ago
- Dissolved: March 17, 1946; 80 years ago
- Split from: Republican Party (in part); Democratic Party (in part)
- Merged into: Republican party
- Ideology: La Folletteism; Wisconsin Idea; Progressivism; Conservatism; Left-wing populism; Agrarianism
- Political position: Left-wing
- National affiliation: National Progressives of America
- Regional affiliation: Farmer-Labor Progressive Federation (De-facto)
- Colors: Green (Customary)

The Wisconsin Progressive Party (1934–1946) was a political third party that briefly held a major role in Wisconsin politics under the two sons of the late Robert M. La Follette. It was on the political left wing, and it sometimes cooperated with the New Deal.

== History ==
=== Background and formation ===
The Party was the brainchild of Philip La Follette and Robert M. La Follette Jr., the sons of Wisconsin Governor and Senator Robert M. La Follette Sr. The party was established in 1934 as an alliance between the longstanding "Progressive" faction of the Republican Party of Wisconsin, led by the La Follette family and their political allies, and certain radical farm and labor groups active in Wisconsin at the time. Journalist John Nichols argues that the 1924 platform that Robert La Follette Sr., ran on:

"taxing the rich, cracking down on Wall Street abuses, empowering workers to organize unions, defending small farmers, breaking up corporate trusts, strengthening public utilities — fueled a resurgence of left-wing populist movements across the upper Midwest: the Non-Partisan League of North Dakota, the Farmer-Labor Party of Minnesota and the Progressive Party of Wisconsin."

The formation of the Wisconsin Progressive Party was held on May 19, 1934, at Fond du Lac City, Fond du Lac County, William T. Evjue served as chairmen during the founding convention.

Buoyed by popular discontent with both major parties, the La Follette brothers were successful in their bids, and the party saw a number of other victories in the 1934 gubernatorial election. In 1935, a faction within the party formed the Farmer-Labor Progressive Federation (FLPF), before and after which the party was victorious in the 1934 state Senate elections and won several U.S. House seats and a majority of the Wisconsin State Senate and Wisconsin State Assembly in 1936. In 1936 it was informally allied with the New Deal coalition and supported the reelection of President Franklin Roosevelt.

=== Progressive governance ===
Following the re-election of Philip, he took a far different tone for his second term than he had for his first. In his second inaugural address he stressed the need for reform in more concrete terms, advocating for an increase in executive power and calling for increased spending towards schools and wages despite a projected $9 million dollar shortfall in the budget.

In a series of legislative sessions, bills were introduced and passed with restrictions on parliamentary debate and without hearings from the public. Additionally, the presiding officers of both chambers would repeatedly rule standard parliamentary procedure as out of order. With the final hours of the 1936 session spent confirming 24 of La Follette's administrative appointments. The session immediately drew controversy as members of both major parties left the chamber shouting "heil" in a mock Nazi salute. while comparisons were made in the media to the dictatorial actions of the deceased Governor of Louisiana Huey Long. In 1937, during a special session within the 63rd Wisconsin Legislature, where Philip La Follette attempted to force through a bill without public debate, and without the normal machinery of the legislative process. The bill, decried by critics as dictatorial, would have, among other things, fundamentally altered the system of checks and balances in Wisconsin by making it so that legislation would be written up by the executive and handed to the legislature to either approve or reject. Alongside this, the session passed through legislation reorganizing the state executive branch to remove redundant agencies to improve efficiency.

==== Cooperation with the Socialists ====
During its heyday, the Progressive Party usually did not run candidates in the Socialists (known as the "sewer socialists") stronghold of Milwaukee. There were strong ideological differences between the two movements as the two aligned with differing national parties. (Socialist State Representative George L. Tews said during a 1932 debate on unemployment compensation and how to fund it argued for the Socialist bill and against the Progressive substitute, stating that a Progressive was "a Socialist with the brains knocked out"), when both faced opposition from the conservative major parties. During the period from 1939 on, the Progressives and the Socialists of Milwaukee sometimes made common cause, with Socialist legislators caucusing with the minority Progressives. In 1942, Socialist Frank P. Zeidler, later to be elected mayor of Milwaukee, was the nominee on the Progressive party line for State Treasurer of Wisconsin.

=== 1938 ===
Governor Philip La Follette announces formation of the National Progressives of America, April 28, 1938.

In an attempt to take the success of the Wisconsin Progressive Party to the national level the National Progressives of America (NPA) was founded in 1938, at the University of Wisconsin-Madison. Philip sought a return to the policy of the "old days" in which

"our country did not pay people to remain idle or to do unproductive work. We gave everyone an opportunity to do wealth-creating work. If they did not take that offer, they could sink or swim as they pleased. Today we have idle resources, and also idle people.... Again we must provide every able-bodied man and woman with a real opportunity for wealth-creating work at decent hours and at decent pay. Then, let us return to the principle that he who is able and does not work—well, then, at least he shall not live at the expense of his neighbor."

Ralph Immell was appointed as the National Progressive's National Director, Immell would go on to state:

"The next decade holds the most critical chapter of American history. it will unfold the story of the eclipse of the two major political parties in America in the struggle of our people to beat off the unwanted European doctrines of Communism, Fascism, and Nazism, and the unworkable European doctrine of pure socialism. We all should be too concerned with the insecurity and want amid plenty to smugly stand by and not play what part we can in the drive of the National Progressives of America to make America once again the land of opportunity and security for every child and man."

The seven Wisconsin Progressive members of the United States House of Representatives appeared with the NPA's Emblem. With Robert Jr. going on to state "I shall do everything I can to contribute to the development of the new party. I shall seize every opportunity that is presented to advance this new movement."

By the 1938 elections, the divisions in the state Progressive Party had grown even more wide, and while the La Follette brothers remained neutral, they privately supported their ally Ekern over the more radical Amlie in the Senate primary that year, as the primary became a conflict between the traditionalist Progressive faction of the party and the more radical leftist progressive faction, and their lack of endorsement exacerbated tensions between both sides, with supporters of Amlie threatening to leave the party over it.

With ongoing scandals and accusations of authoritarianism, fascism and demagoguery, the Progressive party succumbed to a united Democratic and Republican front in 1938 which swept most of them out of office, including in the gubernatorial race, where Philip La Follette lost re-election to Julius P. Heil.

=== 1939–1946 ===
As one of the Senate's leading isolationists, Robert La Follette Jr. helped found the America First Committee in 1940 to oppose Roosevelt's foreign policy and denounce risk of U.S. entry into World War II. Soon Philip found himself working alongside figures such as Charles Lindbergh, which led some to assume he had shifted towards more conservative politics.

Some Progressive leaders such as Evjue began pushing for greater affiliation with the Democratic Party. By the early 1940s Amlie led an exodus of liberals and left-wingers in joining with the Democratic party with Philip viewing the party switchers as traitors.

Orland Steen Loomis was the last Progressive to be elected Governor of Wisconsin, in the 1942 election. He died, however, before his inauguration as governor.

==== Dissolution ====
By 1946, the Wisconsin Progressive Party had all but collapsed, barely qualifying for major party status after the 1944 elections. Over the years the party became factionalized between the support of a rural electorate that was in the middle of ideologically shifting from progressivism to conservatism and the urban left-wing. While Philip La Follette had desired for the party to continue on, after being advised to stay out of the 1946 convention, the Party voted to dissolve itself, voting 284 to 131 to rejoin the Republican Party.

==== Aftermath ====
Robert La Follette Jr. held on to his Senate seat until 1946, when the party decided to disband itself. Robert La Follette Jr. ran for re-election that year as a Republican rather than a Progressive, but was defeated in the Republican primary by Joe McCarthy. The last politician to hold office from the Wisconsin Progressive Party nationally was Merlin Hull, a U.S. Representative from Wisconsin, elected as a Progressive in 1944. (Hull continued to be re-elected on the Republican ticket, and served until his death in 1953.) (Note: Served as a Republican (1931–1933))

== Officeholders ==
=== Federal ===
U.S. senators

- Robert M. La Follette Jr., Senator, 1935–1946 (served as a Republican 1925–1935)

U.S. representatives

- Thomas Ryum Amlie, U.S. Representative from Wisconsin's 1st congressional district (1935–1939) (Note: Served as a Republican (1931–1933))
- Gerald J. Boileau, U.S. Representative from Wisconsin's 7th congressional district (1933–1939) (Note: Served as a Republican (1931–1933) in Wisconsin's 8th congressional district)
- John C. Brophy, U.S. Representative from Wisconsin's 4th congressional district (1947–1949) (Note: Elected as a Republican)
- Bernard J. Gehrmann, U.S. Representative from Wisconsin's 10th congressional district (1935–1943)
- Merlin Hull, U.S. Representative from Wisconsin's 9th congressional district (1935–1946) (Note: Served as a Republican (1929–1931) in Wisconsin's 7th congressional district, Wisconsin's 9th congressional district (1946–1953))
- Harry Sauthoff, U.S. Representative from Wisconsin's 2nd congressional district (1935–1939, 1941–1945)
- George J. Schneider, U.S. Representative from Wisconsin's 8th congressional district (1935–1939) (Note: Served as a Republican (1923–1933) in Wisconsin's 9th congressional district)
- Gardner R. Withrow, U.S. Representative from Wisconsin's 3rd congressional district (1931–1939) (Note: Served as a Republican (1931–1933) in Wisconsin's 7th congressional district, Wisconsin's 3rd congressional district (1949–1961))

=== State ===
Executive branch officials

- Theodore Dammann, Secretary of State of Wisconsin, (1935–1938) (served as a Republican 1927–1935)
- Herman Ekern, Lieutenant Governor of Wisconsin, (1937–1938)
- Henry Gunderson, Lieutenant Governor of Wisconsin, (1936–1937)
- Ralph Immell, Adjutant General of Wisconsin (1923–1946)
- Philip La Follette, Governor of Wisconsin, (1934–1938)
- Solomon Levitan, State Treasurer of Wisconsin, 1937–1938 (served as a Republican 1923–1932)
- Orland Steen Loomis, Attorney General of Wisconsin, 1937–1938; elected Governor in 1942 but died before taking office

County officials

- Herbert J. Steffes, Milwaukee County District Attorney (1936–1940) (Note: Served as a Republican (1940–1944))

State senators

- George Engebretson, state senator from the 2nd district (1937–1939) (Note: served as a Republican (1933–1937))
- Harold Groves, state senator from the 26th district (1935–1937) (Note: served as a Republican in the State Assembly (1933–1935))
- George Hampel, state senator from the 6th district (1937–1945) (Note: served as a Socialist in the State Assembly (1931–1933))
- Michael F. Kresky, Jr., state senator from the 2nd district (1937–1939)
- Joseph E. McDermid, Wisconsin State Senate, 1935–1941
- Oscar S. Paulson, Wisconsin State Senate, 1937–1940
- Elmer Peterson, Wisconsin State Senate, 1943–1947
- Edwin Myrwyn Rowlands, Wisconsin State Senate, 1935–1937
- Herman J. Severson 1934–1938 (also served as a Republican
- Fred W. Zantow, Wisconsin State Senate, reelected on the Progressive ticket, 1934; died before he took office (served as a Republican 1931–1934

State assemblymen

- Paul Alfonsi, Speaker of the Wisconsin State Assembly 1937–1939, Wisconsin State Assembly 1933–1941, 1959–1971
- William H. Barnes, Wisconsin State Assembly, 1935–1940
- Lyall T. Beggs, Wisconsin State Assembly 1941–1947
- Bernard E. Brandt, Wisconsin State Assembly, 1935–1936
- Laurie E. Carlson, Wisconsin State Assembly 1937–1942
- Jorge W. Carow, Speaker of the Wisconsin State Assembly 1935–1936, Wisconsin State Assembly 1929–1936
- John F. Dittbrender, Wisconsin State Assembly, 1939–1940
- George Engebretson, Wisconsin State Senate, 1938 (served as a Republican 1933–1937)
- William R. Foley, Wisconsin State Assembly, 1943–1944
- Oliver H. Fritz, Wisconsin State Assembly, 1937–1939
- John R. Fronek, 1934–1933 (served as a Republican)
- William P. Groves, Wisconsin State Assembly, 1935–1937
- Hjalmer S. Halvorsen, Wisconsin State Assembly, 1934–1937
- James C. Hanson, Wisconsin State Assembly, 1934–1940 (served as a Republican 1917–1934)
- Peter A. Hemmy, Wisconsin State Assembly, 1935–1940
- Martin H. Herzog, Wisconsin State Assembly, 1939–1940
- Arthur A. Hitt, 1934–1939
- Ernst J. Hoesly, 1934–1939
- John E. Johnson, Wisconsin State Assembly
- Arthur D. Kelly, Wisconsin State Assembly, 1934–1939 (served as a Republican 1933–1934)
- Dougald D. Kennedy, Wisconsin State Assembly, 1937–1941
- Edward H. Kiefer, Wisconsin State Assembly 1937–1940 (served as a Socialist 1911–1914, 1931–1936)
- Felix A. Kremer, (Wisconsin State Assembly) 1937–1938
- Chester A. Krohn, Wisconsin State Assembly 1941–1942
- Claud H. Larsen, Wisconsin State Assembly, 1939–1940
- Tom Lomsdahl, Wisconsin State Assembly, 1935–1937
- James S. Mace, Wisconsin State Assembly 1939–1940
- Robert McCutchin, Wisconsin State Assembly, 1943–1944 (served as a Republican 1947–1951)
- Earl Mullen, Wisconsin State Assembly, 1943–1946 (served as a Republican 1947 –1949)
- Carl J. Peik, Wisconsin State Assembly, 1939–1940
- Adam F. Poltl, Wisconsin State Assembly, 1935–1936
- Ben Rubin, Wisconsin State Assembly, 1937–1942 (served as a Socialist 1931–1932)
- Herbert C. Schenck, Wisconsin State Assembly, 1935–1940
- Harry W. Schilling, Wisconsin State Assembly, 1935–1937 (served as a Republican 1947–1951)
- Frank D. Sheahan, Wisconsin State Assembly 1941–1942, 1945–1946
- Reno W. Trego, Wisconsin State Assembly, 1937–1940
- Harry P. Van Guilder, Wisconsin State Assembly, 1937–1942
- Otto A. Vogel, Wisconsin State Assembly, 1935–1936 1939–1940 1943–1948
- Casper D. Waller, Wisconsin State Assembly, 1943–1946
- Frank Weinheimer, Wisconsin State Assembly 1941–1942
- Herman B. Wegner, Wisconsin State Assembly, 1934–1944 (served as a Socialist 1933–1934)
- George J. Woerth, Wisconsin State Assembly 1935–1939

== Electoral history ==
=== Wisconsin state offices ===
Governor						Lieutenant governor						Attorney general					
Year	Nominee	# votes	% votes	Place	Notes	Year	Nominee	# votes	% votes	Place	Notes	Year	Nominee	# votes	% votes	Place	Notes
1934	Philip La Follette	373,093	39.12 / 100	Elected		1934	Henry Gunderson	313,682	35.25 / 100	2nd of 7		1934	Fred M. Wylie	303,387	35.06 / 100	2nd of 7	
1936	Philip La Follette	573,724	46.38 / 100	Re-elected		1936	Henry Gunderson	465,918	41.69 / 100	Elected		1936	Orland Steen Loomis	394,252	36.10 / 100	Elected	
1938	Philip La Follette	353,381	36.00 / 100	2nd of 5		1938	George A. Nelson	313,066	34.36 / 100	2nd of 5		1938	Orland Steen Loomis	316,657	35.24 / 100	2nd of 4	
1940	Orland Steen Loomis	546,436	39.78 / 100	2nd of 5		1940	Anton M. Miller	411,055	32.53 / 100	2nd of 4		1940	Otto F. Christenson	367,009	29.76 / 100	2nd of 4	
1942	Orland Steen Loomis	397,664	49.65 / 100	Elected		1942	Henry J. Berquist	256,851	34.82 / 100	2nd of 5		1942	William H. Dieterich	205,730	21.41 / 100	2nd of 5	
1944	Alexander Otto Benz	76,028	5.76 / 100	3rd of 5		1944	Clough Gates	79,068	6.38 / 100	3rd of 4		1944	William H. Dieterich	84,989	7.00 / 100	3rd of 4	
Secretary of state						Treasurer											
Year	Nominee	# votes	% votes	Place	Notes	Year	Nominee	# votes	% votes	Place	Notes						
1934	Theodore Dammann	419,249	46.66 / 100	Re-elected		1934	Albert C. Johnson	302,639	34.41 / 100	2nd of 6							
1936	Theodore Dammann	601,638	52.12 / 100	Re-elected		1936	Solomon Levitan	457,942	40.03 / 100	Elected							
1938	Theodore Dammann	391,150	41.61 / 100	2nd of 5		1938	Solomon Levitan	368,707	40.28 / 100	2nd of 5							
1940	Adolph W. Larsen	332,505	26.03 / 100	2nd of 4		1940	Frank Zeidler	382,237	30.65 / 100	2nd of 4							
1942	John H. Kaiser	196,287	26.19 / 100	2nd of 5		1942	Albert C. Johnson	215,995	29.63 / 100	2nd of 5							
1944	Adelaide Woelfel	12,681	1.04 / 100	4th of 4		1944	Albert C. Johnson	73,451	5.98 / 100	3rd of 4							

Wisconsin Senate								Wisconsin Assembly							
Election	Leader	Votes		Seats		Position	Control	Election	Leader	Votes		Seats		Position	Control
Election	Leader	No.	Share	No.	±	Position	Control	Election	Leader	No.	Share	No.	±	Position	Control
1934	N/A	136,749	32.53%	11 / 33	▲11	2nd	Democratic–Republican	1934	Jorge W. Carow	304,804	34.09%	45 / 100	▲45	1st	Progressive minority
1936	Walter J. Rush	242,631	42.00%	16 / 33	▲5	1st	Progressive minority	1936	Jorge W. Carow	437,916	38.73%	46 / 100	▲1	1st	Progressive minority
1938	N/A	154,891	35.00%	11 / 33	▼5	2nd	Republican minority	1938	Paul Alfonsi			32 / 100	▼12	2nd	Republican
1940	Philip E. Nelson	212,631	32.09%	6 / 33	▼5	2nd	Republican	1940	N/A			25 / 100	▼7	2nd	Republican
1942	Philip E. Nelson	85,806	25.18%	6 / 33	Steady	2nd	Republican	1942	Andrew Biemiller			13 / 100	▼12	3rd	Republican
1944	N/A	47,895	8.81%	5 / 33	▼1	3rd	Republican	1944	Lyall T. Beggs			6 / 100	▼7	3rd	Republican

=== Wisconsin federal offices ===
U.S. Senate						U.S. House of Representatives							
Year	Nominee	# votes	% votes	Place	Notes	Election	Leader	Votes		Seats		Position	Control
1934	Robert M. La Follette Jr.	440,513	47.78 / 100	Re-elected		1934	George J. Schneider	334,345	37.76%	7 / 10	▲7	1st	Progressive
1936	No seat up					1936	George J. Schneider	479,263	42.69%	7 / 10	Steady	1st	Progressive
1938	Herman Ekern	249,209	26.58 / 100	2nd of 6		1938	George J. Schneider	330,823	36.26%	2 / 10	▼5	2nd	Republican
1940	Robert M. La Follette Jr.	605,609	45.26 / 100	Re-elected		1940	N/A	469,063	36.96%	3 / 10	▲1	2nd	Republican
1942	No seat up					1942	N/A	185,114	24.72%	2 / 10	▼1	3rd	Republican
1944	Harry Sauthoff	73,089	5.82 / 100	3rd of 5		1944	N/A	104,377	9.01%	1 / 10	▼1	3rd	Republican

== See also ==
- Political party strength in Wisconsin
- La Follette family
- Progressive Era
- Minnesota Farmer–Labor Party
- Third party (United States)
