= Wisconsin's 18th Senate district =

American legislative district in east-central Wisconsin

Wisconsin's 18th State Senate district
- 2024 map defined in 2023 Wisc. Act 94; 2022 map defined in Johnson v. Wisconsin Elections Commission; 2011 map was defined in 2011 Wisc. Act 43 composed of Assembly districts 52, 53, and 54
Senator
Kristin Dassler-Alfheim; D–Appleton
since January 6, 2025 (1 year, 82 days)
- Demographics: 83.98% White; 3.9% Black; 5.03% Hispanic; 4.54% Asian; 2.16% Native American; 0.15% Hawaiian/Pacific Islander
- Population (2020) • Voting age: 178,722; 141,269
- Website: Official website
- Notes: East-central Wisconsin

The 18th Senate district of Wisconsin is one of 33 districts in the Wisconsin Senate. Located in the heart of the Fox Cities in east-central Wisconsin, the district comprises parts of northeast Winnebago County and southern Outagamie County. It includes the cities of Menasha and Neenah, most of the city of Appleton, and the northern half of the city of Oshkosh. It contains landmarks such as College Avenue Historic District, Lawrence University, and the University of Wisconsin–Oshkosh campus.

== Current elected officials ==
Kristin Dassler-Alfheim is the senator representing the 18th district. She was first elected to the Senate in the 2024 general election.

Each Wisconsin State Senate district is composed of three Wisconsin State Assembly districts. The 18th Senate district comprises the 52nd, 53rd, and 54th Assembly districts. The current representatives of those districts are:

- Assembly District 52: Lee Snodgrass (D–Appleton)
- Assembly District 53: Dean Kaufert (R–Neenah)
- Assembly District 54: Lori Palmeri (D–Oshkosh)

The district is crosses two congressional districts. The part of the district in Outagamie County falls within Wisconsin's 8th congressional district, which is represented by U.S. Representative Mike Gallagher. The remainder of the district in Winnebago County falls within Wisconsin's 6th congressional district, represented by U.S. Representative Glenn Grothman.

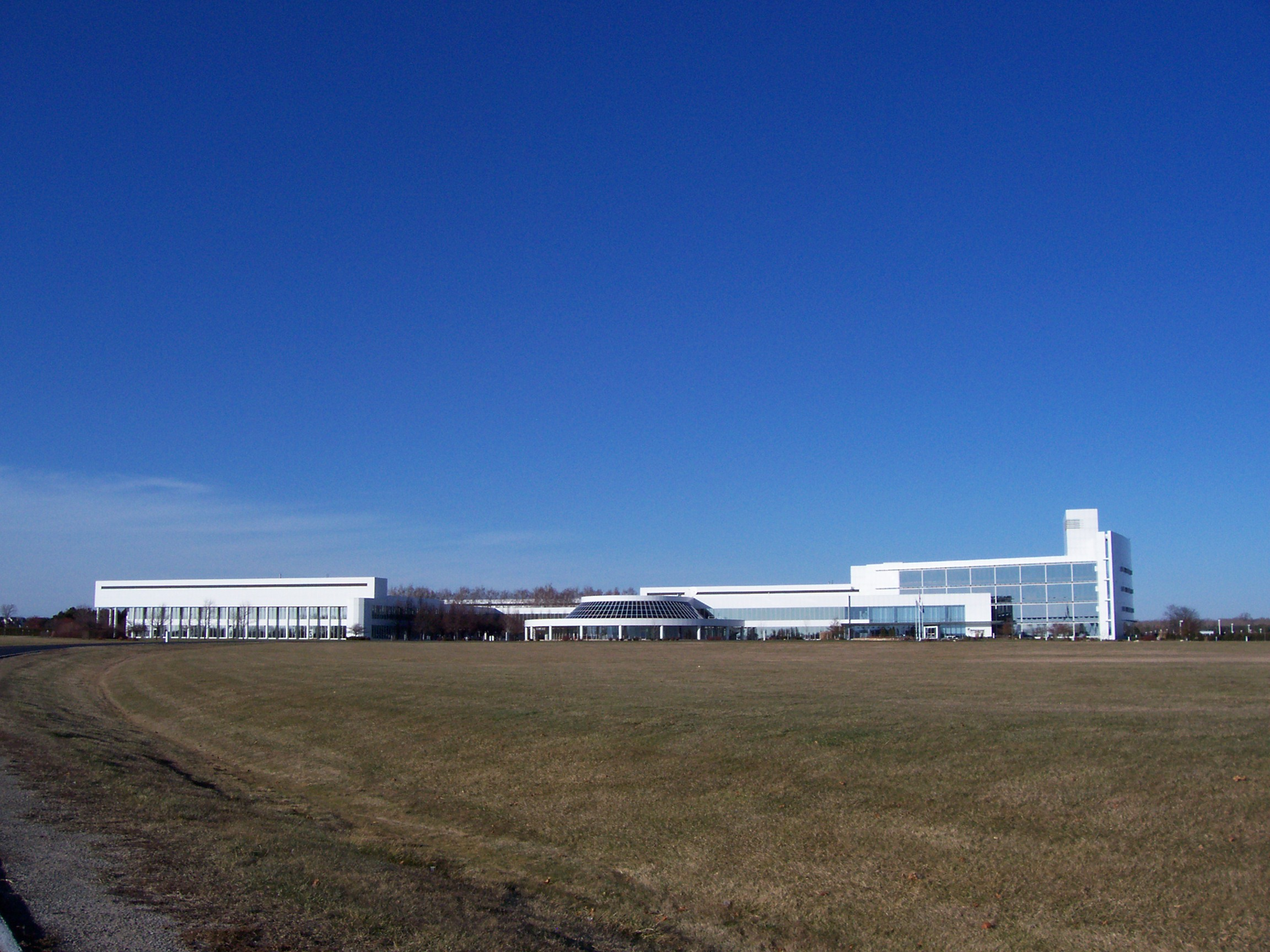
Thrivent Financial Appleton headquarters

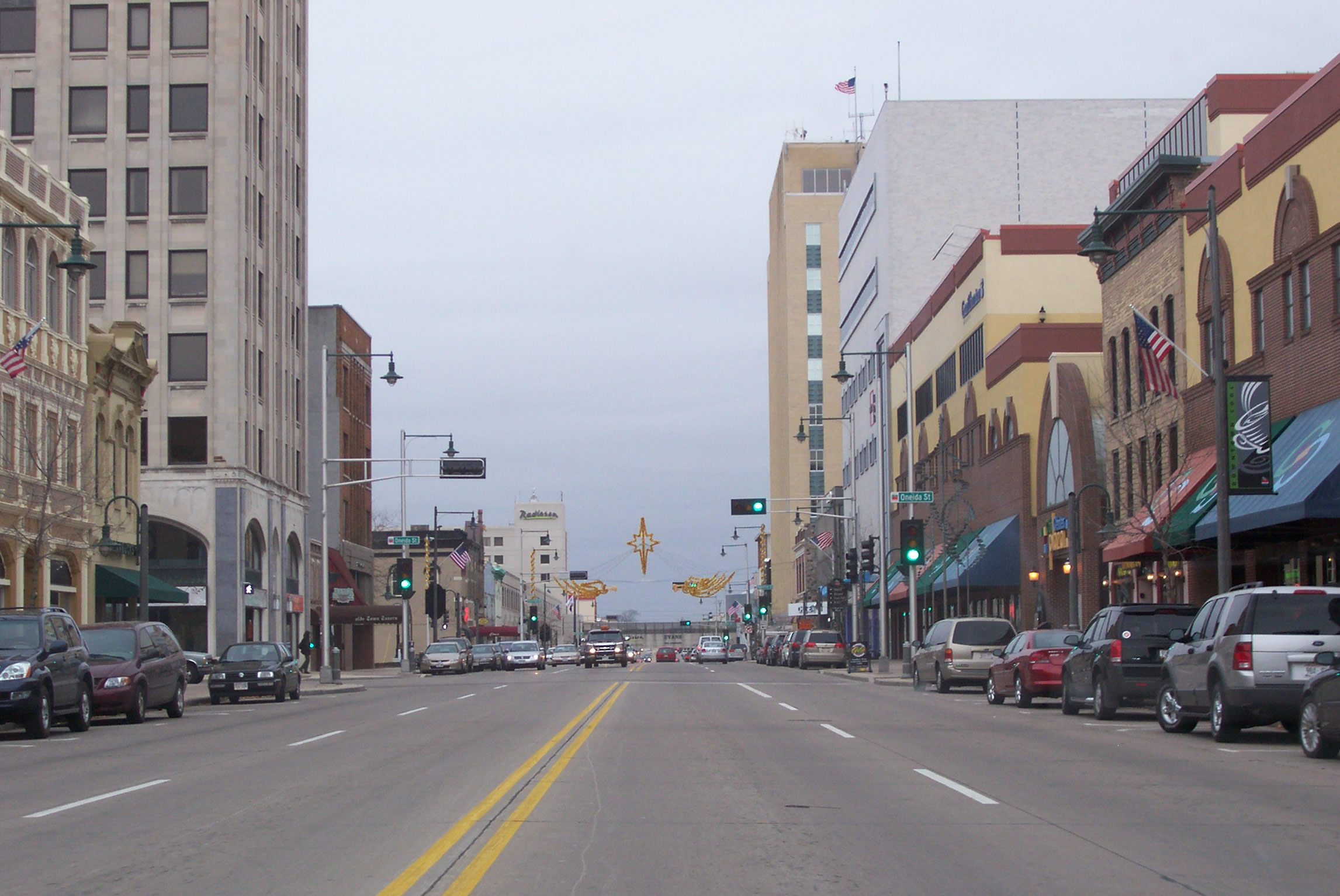
College Avenue Historic District in downtown Appleton

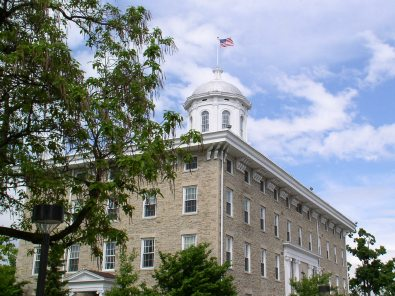
Main Hall of Lawrence University

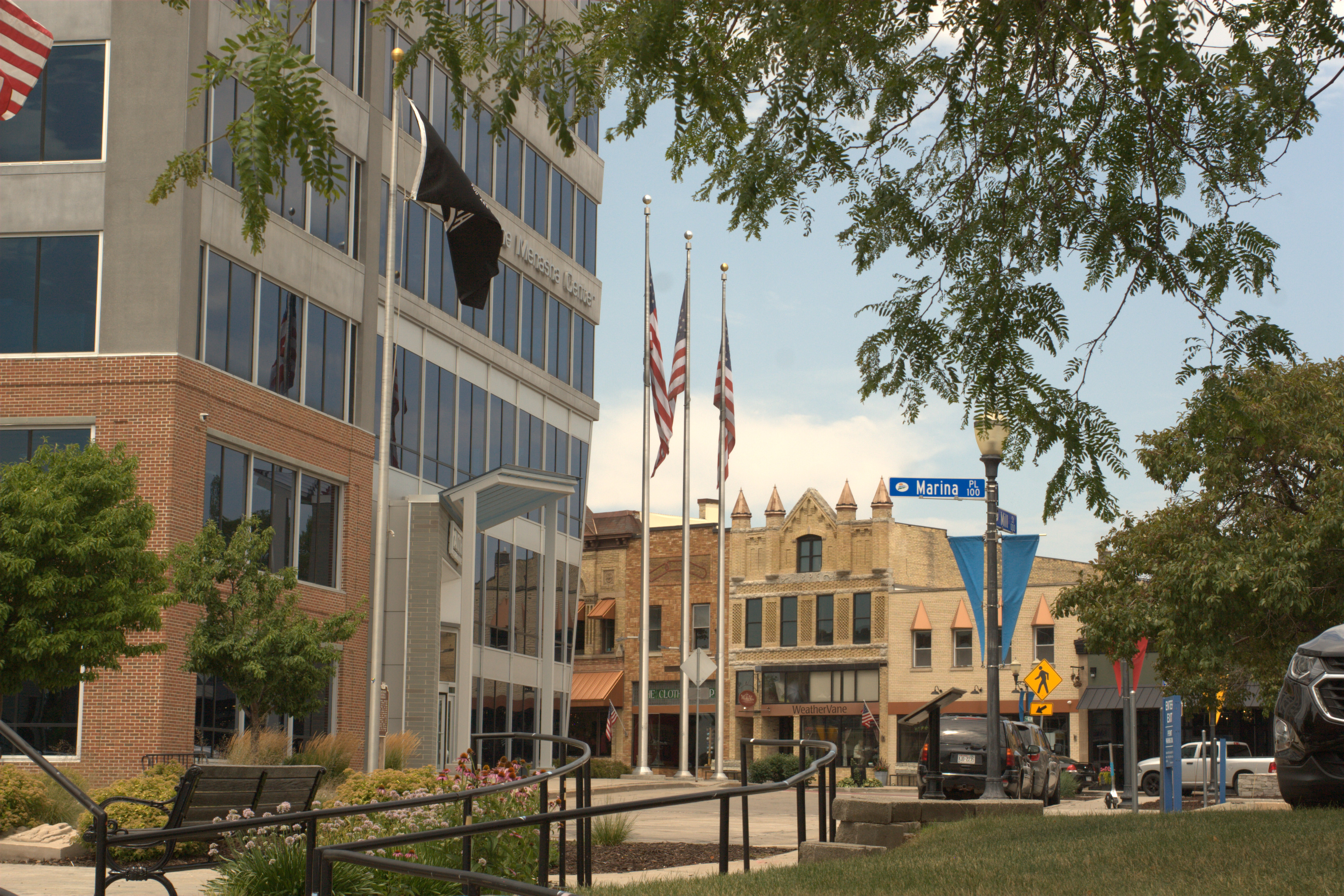
Downtown Menasha

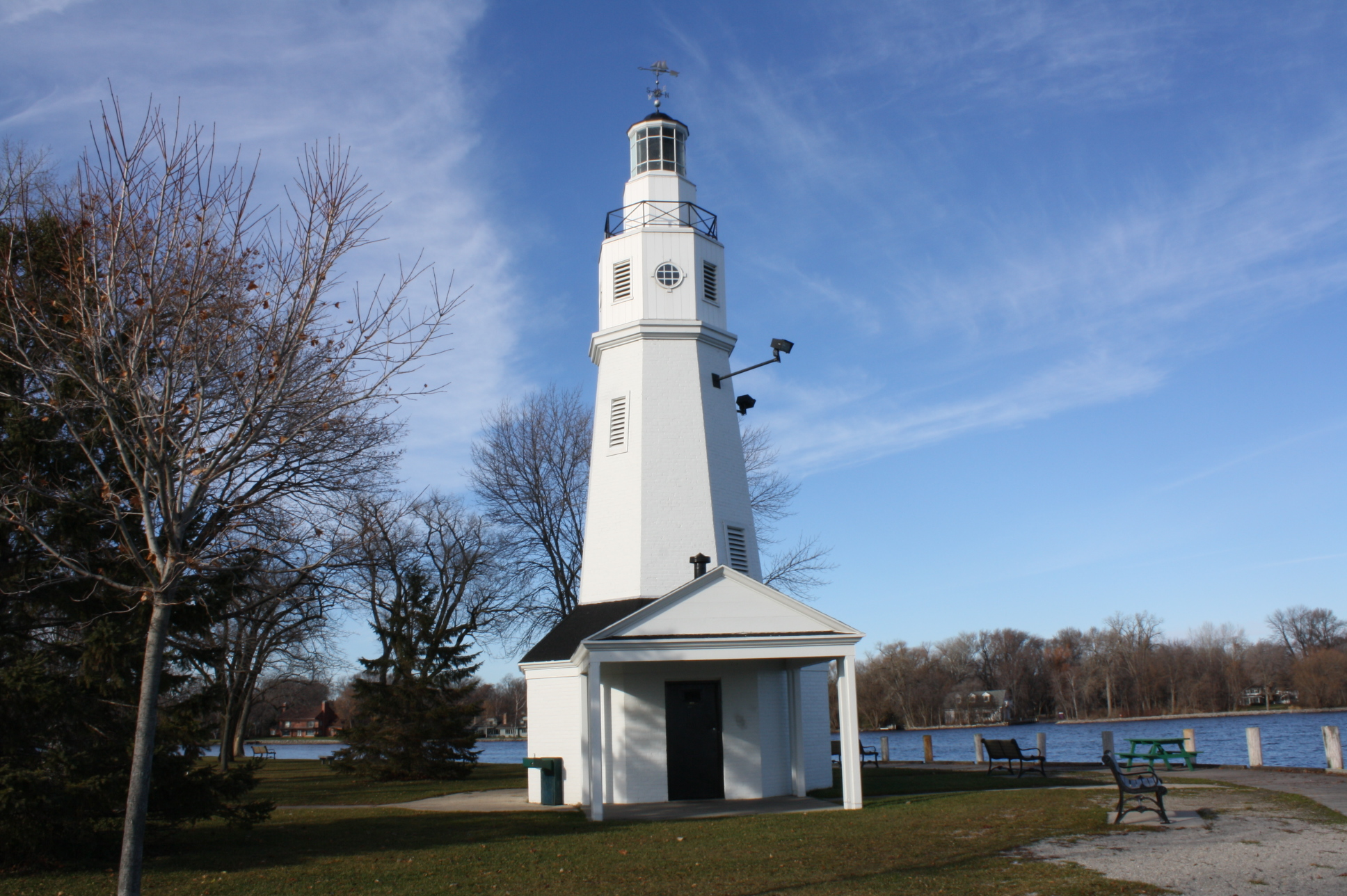
Kimberly Point Lighthouse on Neenah Point

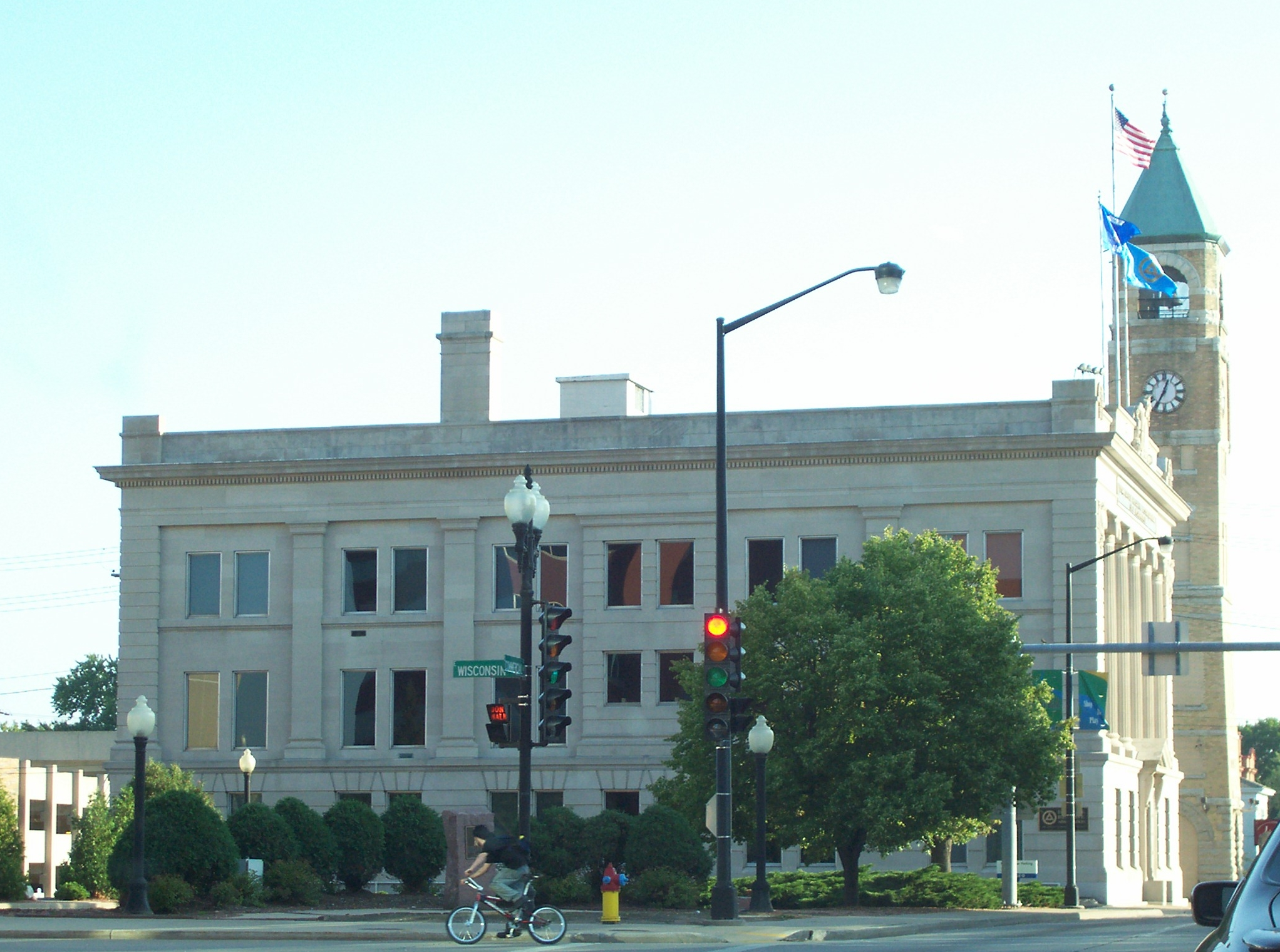
Neenah City Hall

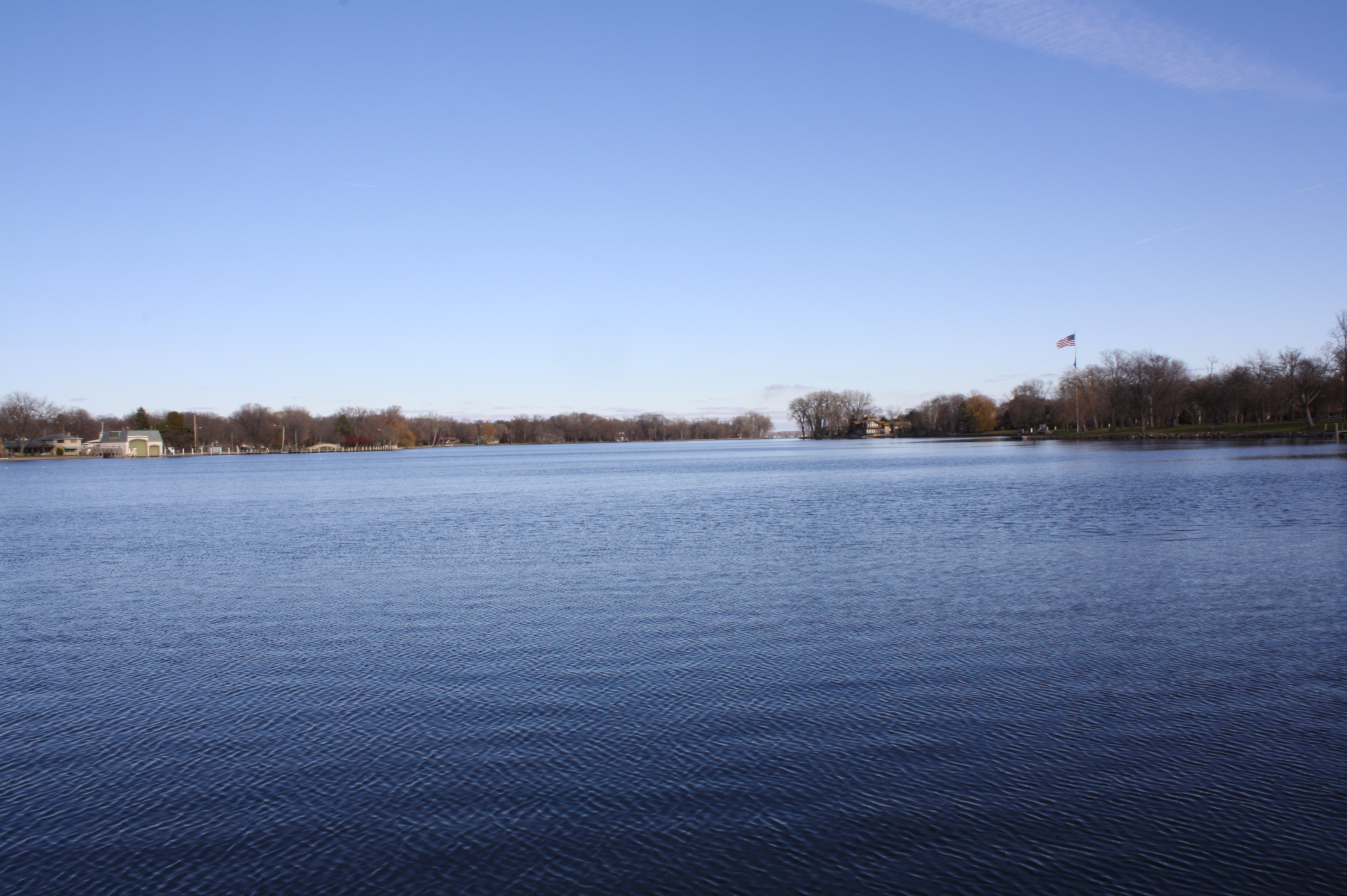
Doty Island viewed from Neenah

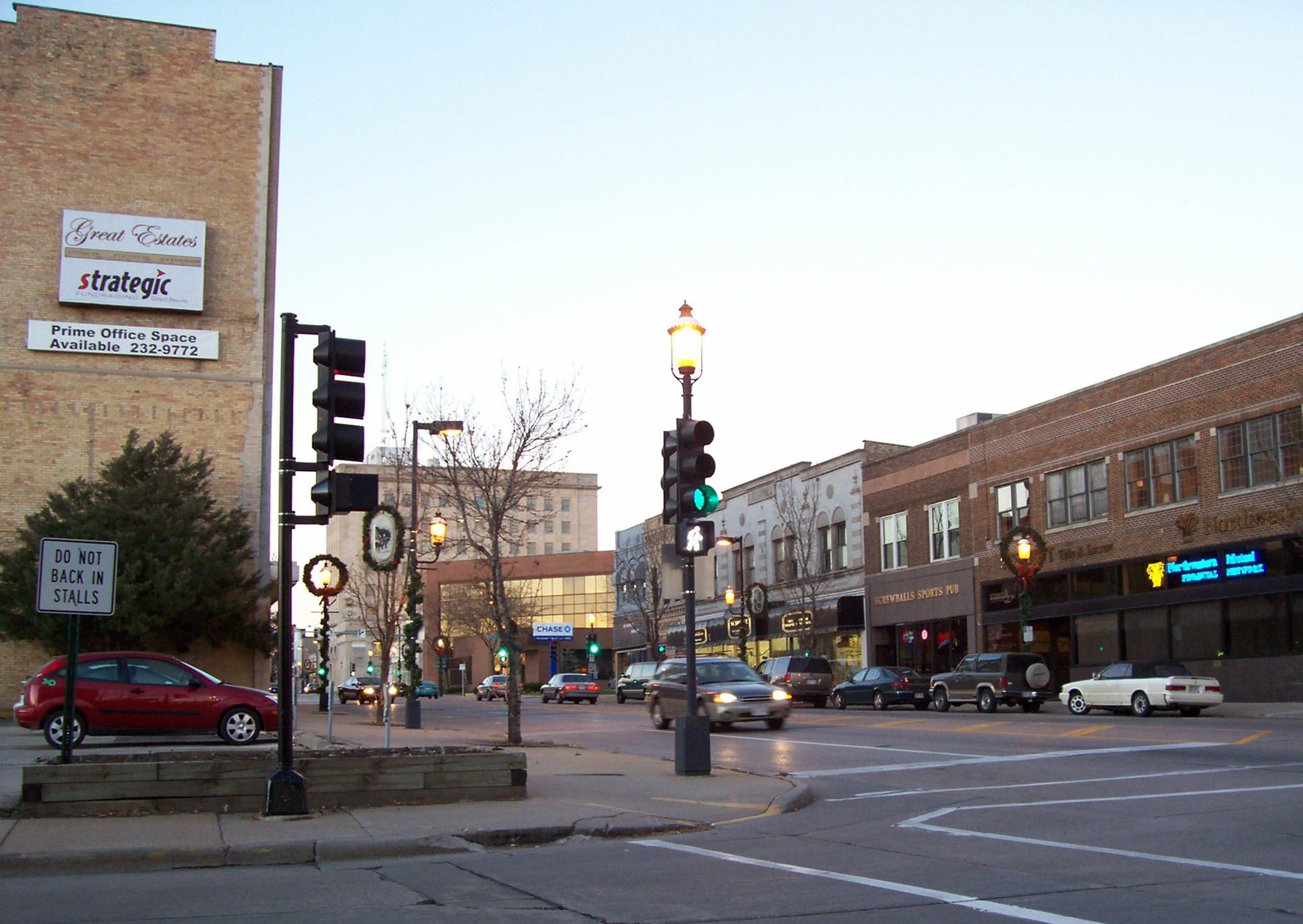
Downtown Oshkosh

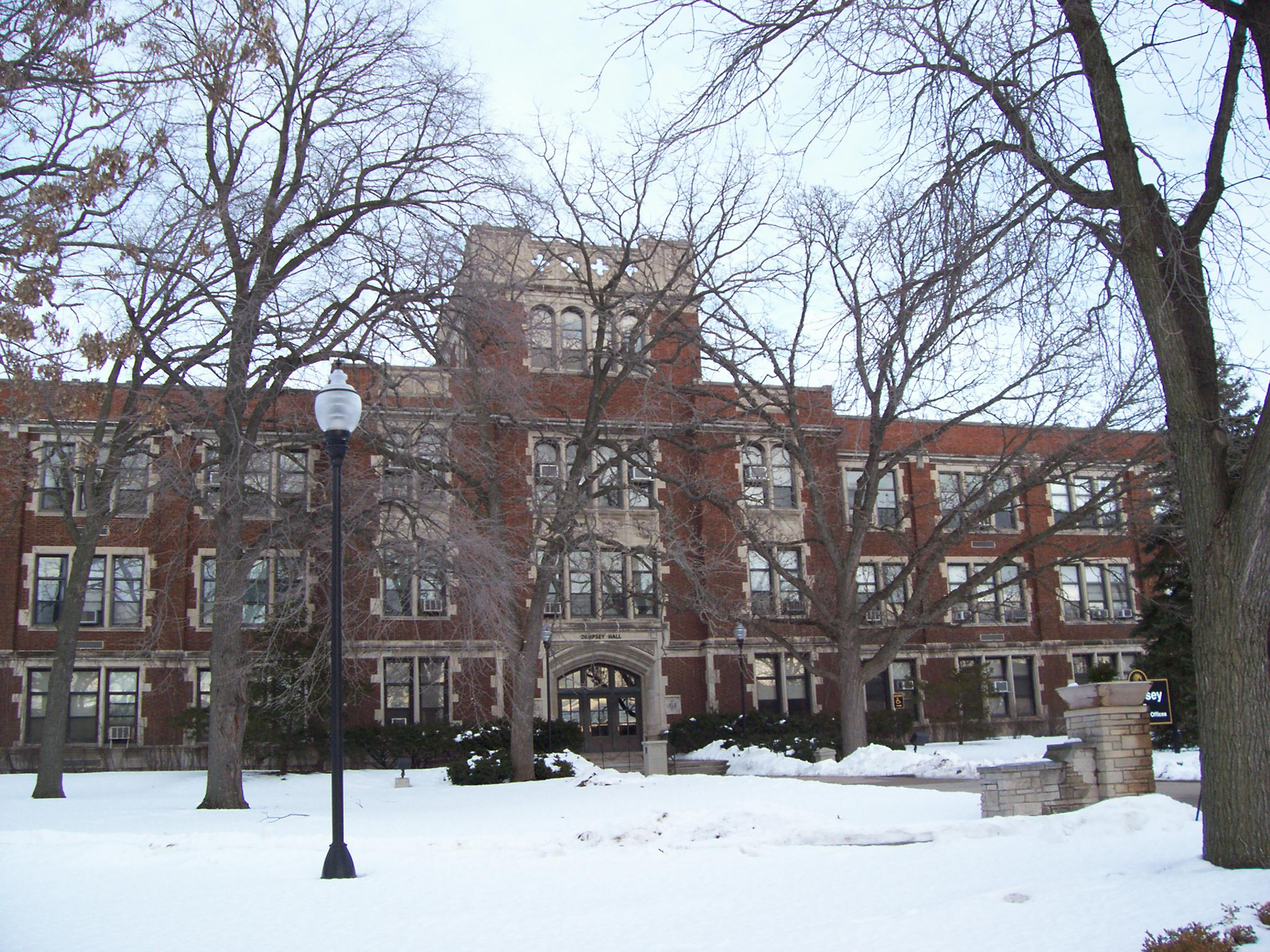
Historic Dempsey Hall on the University of Wisconsin–Oshkosh campus

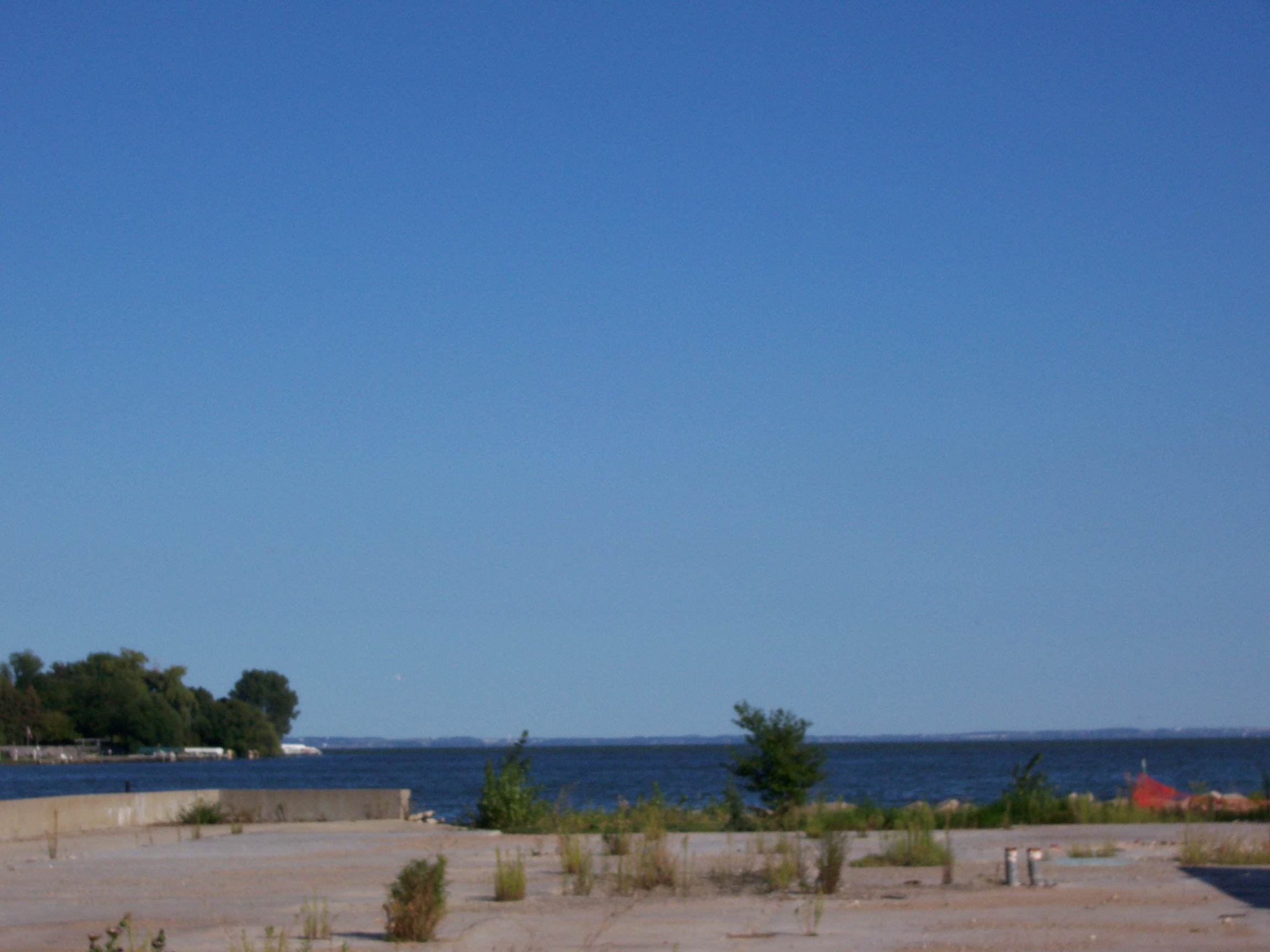
Where the Fox River meets Lake Winnebago

== Past senators ==
The district has previously been represented by:

Note: the boundaries of districts have changed repeatedly over history. Previous politicians of a specific numbered district have represented a completely different geographic area, due to redistricting. Prior to 1852, the 18th District was a Milwaukee-area district.

Senator	Party	Notes	Session	Years	District Definition
District created				1848	Southern Milwaukee County: Town of Franklin; Town of Greenfield; Town of Lake; Town of Oak Creek; Wards 3, 4, 5, City of Milwaukee
Asa Kinney	Dem.		1st	1848	Southern Milwaukee County: Town of Franklin; Town of Greenfield; Town of Lake; Town of Oak Creek; Wards 3, 4, 5, City of Milwaukee
Asa Kinney	Dem.		2nd	1849	Southern Milwaukee County: Town of Franklin; Town of Greenfield; Town of Lake; Town of Oak Creek; Wards 3, 4, 5, City of Milwaukee
Duncan Reed	Dem.	Redistricted to 6th district.	3rd	1850	Southern Milwaukee County: Town of Franklin; Town of Greenfield; Town of Lake; Town of Oak Creek; Wards 3, 4, 5, City of Milwaukee
Duncan Reed	Dem.	Redistricted to 6th district.	4th	1851	Southern Milwaukee County: Town of Franklin; Town of Greenfield; Town of Lake; Town of Oak Creek; Wards 3, 4, 5, City of Milwaukee
Duncan Reed	Dem.	Redistricted to 6th district.	5th	1852	Southern Milwaukee County: Town of Franklin; Town of Greenfield; Town of Lake; Town of Oak Creek; Wards 3, 4, 5, City of Milwaukee
John R. Briggs Jr.	Whig	Won 1852 special election.	6th	1853	Eastern Rock County: Town of Beloit; Town of Bradford; Town of Clinton; Town of Harmony; Town of Johnstown; Town of La Prairie; Town of Lima; Town of Milton; Town of Turtle
Louis P. Harvey	Whig		7th	1854	Eastern Rock County: Town of Beloit; Town of Bradford; Town of Clinton; Town of Harmony; Town of Johnstown; Town of La Prairie; Town of Lima; Town of Milton; Town of Turtle
Louis P. Harvey	Rep.		8th	1855	Eastern Rock County: Town of Beloit; Town of Bradford; Town of Clinton; Town of Harmony; Town of Johnstown; Town of La Prairie; Town of Lima; Town of Milton; Town of Turtle
Louis P. Harvey	Rep.		9th	1856	Eastern Rock County: Town of Beloit; Town of Bradford; Town of Clinton; Town of Harmony; Town of Johnstown; Town of La Prairie; Town of Lima; Town of Milton; Town of Turtle
Louis P. Harvey	Rep.		10th	1857	Eastern Rock County: Town of Beloit; Town of Bradford; Town of Clinton; Town of Harmony; Town of Johnstown; Town of La Prairie; Town of Lima; Town of Milton; Town of Turtle; City of Beloit
Alden I. Bennett	Rep.		11th	1858	Eastern Rock County: Town of Beloit; Town of Bradford; Town of Clinton; Town of Harmony; Town of Johnstown; Town of La Prairie; Town of Lima; Town of Milton; Town of Turtle; City of Beloit
Alden I. Bennett	Rep.		12th	1859	Eastern Rock County: Town of Beloit; Town of Bradford; Town of Clinton; Town of Harmony; Town of Johnstown; Town of La Prairie; Town of Lima; Town of Milton; Town of Turtle; City of Beloit
Alden I. Bennett	Rep.		13th	1860	Eastern Rock County: Town of Beloit; Town of Bradford; Town of Clinton; Town of Harmony; Town of Johnstown; Town of La Prairie; Town of Lima; Town of Milton; Town of Turtle; City of Beloit
Alden I. Bennett	Rep.		14th	1861	Eastern Rock County: Town of Beloit; Town of Bradford; Town of Clinton; Town of Harmony; Town of Johnstown; Town of La Prairie; Town of Lima; Town of Milton; Town of Turtle; City of Beloit
Joel Rich	Dem.		15th	1862	Western Dodge County: Town of Beaver Dam; Town of Burnett; Town of Calamus; Town of Chester; Town of Clyman; Town of Elba; Town of Emmet; Town of Fox Lake; Town of Lowell; Town of Oak Grove; Town of Portland; Town of Shields; Town of Westford; City of Beaver Dam; South Ward, Village of Waupun; Wards 5, 6, City of Watertown
Joel Rich	Dem.		16th	1863	Western Dodge County: Town of Beaver Dam; Town of Burnett; Town of Calamus; Town of Chester; Town of Clyman; Town of Elba; Town of Emmet; Town of Fox Lake; Town of Lowell; Town of Oak Grove; Town of Portland; Town of Shields; Town of Westford; City of Beaver Dam; South Ward, Village of Waupun; Wards 5, 6, City of Watertown
William E. Smith	Natl. Union		17th	1864	Western Dodge County: Town of Beaver Dam; Town of Burnett; Town of Calamus; Town of Chester; Town of Clyman; Town of Elba; Town of Emmet; Town of Fox Lake; Town of Lowell; Town of Oak Grove; Town of Portland; Town of Shields; Town of Westford; City of Beaver Dam; South Ward, Village of Waupun; Wards 5, 6, City of Watertown
William E. Smith	Natl. Union		18th	1865	Western Dodge County: Town of Beaver Dam; Town of Burnett; Town of Calamus; Town of Chester; Town of Clyman; Town of Elba; Town of Emmet; Town of Fox Lake; Town of Lowell; Town of Oak Grove; Town of Portland; Town of Shields; Town of Westford; City of Beaver Dam; South Ward, Village of Waupun; Wards 5, 6, City of Watertown
Stoddard Judd	Natl. Union		19th	1866	Western Dodge County: Town of Beaver Dam; Town of Burnett; Town of Calamus; Town of Chester; Town of Clyman; Town of Elba; Town of Emmet; Town of Fox Lake; Town of Lowell; Town of Oak Grove; Town of Portland; Town of Shields; Town of Westford; City of Beaver Dam; South Ward, Village of Waupun; Wards 5, 6, City of Watertown
Stoddard Judd	Natl. Union		20th	1867	Western Dodge County: Town of Beaver Dam; Town of Burnett; Town of Calamus; Town of Chester; Town of Elba; Town of Fox Lake; Town of Lowell; Town of Oak Grove; Town of Portland; Town of Shields; Town of Trenton; Town of Westford; City of Beaver Dam; South Ward, Village of Waupun
Henry W. Lander	Dem.		21st	1868	Western Dodge County: Town of Beaver Dam; Town of Burnett; Town of Calamus; Town of Chester; Town of Elba; Town of Fox Lake; Town of Lowell; Town of Oak Grove; Town of Portland; Town of Shields; Town of Trenton; Town of Westford; City of Beaver Dam; South Ward, Village of Waupun
Henry W. Lander	Dem.		22nd	1869	Western Dodge County: Town of Beaver Dam; Town of Burnett; Town of Calamus; Town of Chester; Town of Elba; Town of Fox Lake; Town of Lowell; Town of Oak Grove; Town of Portland; Town of Shields; Town of Trenton; Town of Westford; City of Beaver Dam; South Ward, Village of Waupun
Samuel D. Burchard	Dem.		23rd	1870	Western Dodge County: Town of Beaver Dam; Town of Burnett; Town of Calamus; Town of Chester; Town of Elba; Town of Fox Lake; Town of Lowell; Town of Oak Grove; Town of Portland; Town of Shields; Town of Trenton; Town of Westford; City of Beaver Dam; South Ward, Village of Waupun
Samuel D. Burchard	Dem.		24th	1871	Western Dodge County: Town of Beaver Dam; Town of Burnett; Town of Calamus; Town of Chester; Town of Elba; Town of Fox Lake; Town of Lowell; Town of Oak Grove; Town of Portland; Town of Shields; Town of Trenton; Town of Westford; City of Beaver Dam; South Ward, Village of Waupun
William Hiner	Rep.		25th	1872	Western Fond du Lac County: Town of Alto; Town of Eldorado; Town of Fond du Lac; Town of Friendship; Town of Lamartine; Town of Metomen; Town of Oakfield; Town of Ripon; Town of Rosendale; Town of Springvale; Town of Waupun; City of Fond du Lac; City of Ripon; North Ward, Village of Waupun
William Hiner	Rep.		26th	1873	Western Fond du Lac County: Town of Alto; Town of Eldorado; Town of Fond du Lac; Town of Friendship; Town of Lamartine; Town of Metomen; Town of Oakfield; Town of Ripon; Town of Rosendale; Town of Springvale; Town of Waupun; City of Fond du Lac; City of Ripon; North Ward, Village of Waupun
William Hiner	Rep.		27th	1874	Western Fond du Lac County: Town of Alto; Town of Eldorado; Town of Fond du Lac; Town of Friendship; Town of Lamartine; Town of Metomen; Town of Oakfield; Town of Ripon; Town of Rosendale; Town of Springvale; Town of Waupun; City of Fond du Lac; City of Ripon; North Ward, Village of Waupun
William Hiner	Rep.		28th	1875	Western Fond du Lac County: Town of Alto; Town of Eldorado; Town of Fond du Lac; Town of Friendship; Town of Lamartine; Town of Metomen; Town of Oakfield; Town of Ripon; Town of Rosendale; Town of Springvale; Town of Waupun; City of Fond du Lac; City of Ripon; North Ward, Village of Waupun
William Hiner	Rep.		29th	1876	Western Fond du Lac County: Town of Alto; Town of Eldorado; Town of Fond du Lac; Town of Friendship; Town of Lamartine; Town of Metomen; Town of Oakfield; Town of Ripon; Town of Rosendale; Town of Springvale; Town of Waupun; City of Fond du Lac; City of Ripon; North Ward, Village of Waupun
William Hiner	Rep.		30th	1877	1876–1881 1882–1887 1888–1891 Western Fond du Lac County: Town of Alto; Town of Byron; Town of Eldorado; Town of Empire; Town of Fond du Lac; Town of Friendship; Town of Lamartine; Town of Metomen; Town of Oakfield; Town of Ripon; Town of Rosendale; Town of Springvale; Town of Waupun; City of Fond du Lac; City of Ripon; North Ward, Village of Waupun; 1885 population: 34,172
Alonzo A. Loper	Rep.		31st	1878	1876–1881 1882–1887 1888–1891 Western Fond du Lac County: Town of Alto; Town of Byron; Town of Eldorado; Town of Empire; Town of Fond du Lac; Town of Friendship; Town of Lamartine; Town of Metomen; Town of Oakfield; Town of Ripon; Town of Rosendale; Town of Springvale; Town of Waupun; City of Fond du Lac; City of Ripon; North Ward, Village of Waupun; 1885 population: 34,172
Alonzo A. Loper	Rep.		32nd	1879	1876–1881 1882–1887 1888–1891 Western Fond du Lac County: Town of Alto; Town of Byron; Town of Eldorado; Town of Empire; Town of Fond du Lac; Town of Friendship; Town of Lamartine; Town of Metomen; Town of Oakfield; Town of Ripon; Town of Rosendale; Town of Springvale; Town of Waupun; City of Fond du Lac; City of Ripon; North Ward, Village of Waupun; 1885 population: 34,172
George E. Sutherland	Rep.		33rd	1880	1876–1881 1882–1887 1888–1891 Western Fond du Lac County: Town of Alto; Town of Byron; Town of Eldorado; Town of Empire; Town of Fond du Lac; Town of Friendship; Town of Lamartine; Town of Metomen; Town of Oakfield; Town of Ripon; Town of Rosendale; Town of Springvale; Town of Waupun; City of Fond du Lac; City of Ripon; North Ward, Village of Waupun; 1885 population: 34,172
George E. Sutherland	Rep.		34th	1881	1876–1881 1882–1887 1888–1891 Western Fond du Lac County: Town of Alto; Town of Byron; Town of Eldorado; Town of Empire; Town of Fond du Lac; Town of Friendship; Town of Lamartine; Town of Metomen; Town of Oakfield; Town of Ripon; Town of Rosendale; Town of Springvale; Town of Waupun; City of Fond du Lac; City of Ripon; North Ward, Village of Waupun; 1885 population: 34,172
Edward Colman	Rep.		35th	1882	1876–1881 1882–1887 1888–1891 Western Fond du Lac County: Town of Alto; Town of Byron; Town of Eldorado; Town of Empire; Town of Fond du Lac; Town of Friendship; Town of Lamartine; Town of Metomen; Town of Oakfield; Town of Ripon; Town of Rosendale; Town of Springvale; Town of Waupun; City of Fond du Lac; City of Ripon; North Ward, Village of Waupun; 1885 population: 34,172
Edward Colman	Rep.		36th	1883–1884	1876–1881 1882–1887 1888–1891 Western Fond du Lac County: Town of Alto; Town of Byron; Town of Eldorado; Town of Empire; Town of Fond du Lac; Town of Friendship; Town of Lamartine; Town of Metomen; Town of Oakfield; Town of Ripon; Town of Rosendale; Town of Springvale; Town of Waupun; City of Fond du Lac; City of Ripon; North Ward, Village of Waupun; 1885 population: 34,172
James F. Ware	Rep.		37th	1885–1886	1876–1881 1882–1887 1888–1891 Western Fond du Lac County: Town of Alto; Town of Byron; Town of Eldorado; Town of Empire; Town of Fond du Lac; Town of Friendship; Town of Lamartine; Town of Metomen; Town of Oakfield; Town of Ripon; Town of Rosendale; Town of Springvale; Town of Waupun; City of Fond du Lac; City of Ripon; North Ward, Village of Waupun; 1885 population: 34,172
James F. Ware	Rep.		38th	1887–1888	1876–1881 1882–1887 1888–1891 Western Fond du Lac County: Town of Alto; Town of Byron; Town of Eldorado; Town of Empire; Town of Fond du Lac; Town of Friendship; Town of Lamartine; Town of Metomen; Town of Oakfield; Town of Ripon; Town of Rosendale; Town of Springvale; Town of Waupun; City of Fond du Lac; City of Ripon; North Ward, Village of Waupun; 1885 population: 34,172
Samuel B. Stanchfield	Rep.		39th	1889–1890	1876–1881 1882–1887 1888–1891 Western Fond du Lac County: Town of Alto; Town of Byron; Town of Eldorado; Town of Empire; Town of Fond du Lac; Town of Friendship; Town of Lamartine; Town of Metomen; Town of Oakfield; Town of Ripon; Town of Rosendale; Town of Springvale; Town of Waupun; City of Fond du Lac; City of Ripon; North Ward, Village of Waupun; 1885 population: 34,172
Samuel B. Stanchfield	Rep.		40th	1891–1892	1876–1881 1882–1887 1888–1891 Western Fond du Lac County: Town of Alto; Town of Byron; Town of Eldorado; Town of Empire; Town of Fond du Lac; Town of Friendship; Town of Lamartine; Town of Metomen; Town of Oakfield; Town of Ripon; Town of Rosendale; Town of Springvale; Town of Waupun; City of Fond du Lac; City of Ripon; North Ward, Village of Waupun; 1885 population: 34,172
Samuel M. Smead	Dem.	Resigned Jan. 1895.	41st	1893–1894	Fond du Lac County; 1890 population: 42,088
Lyman W. Thayer	Rep.	Won 1895 special election.	42nd	1895–1896	Fond du Lac County; 1890 population: 42,088
Lyman W. Thayer	Rep.	Won 1895 special election.	43rd	1897–1898	1896–1901 1902–1911 1912–1921 Fond du Lac & Green Lake counties 1895 population: 63,375; 1900 population: 63,386
Lyman W. Thayer	Rep.	Won 1895 special election.	44th	1899–1900	1896–1901 1902–1911 1912–1921 Fond du Lac & Green Lake counties 1895 population: 63,375; 1900 population: 63,386
Elmer D. Morse	Rep.		45th	1901–1902	1896–1901 1902–1911 1912–1921 Fond du Lac & Green Lake counties 1895 population: 63,375; 1900 population: 63,386
Elmer D. Morse	Rep.		46th	1903–1904	1896–1901 1902–1911 1912–1921 Fond du Lac & Green Lake counties 1895 population: 63,375; 1900 population: 63,386
Charles H. Smith	Dem.		47th	1905–1906	1896–1901 1902–1911 1912–1921 Fond du Lac & Green Lake counties 1895 population: 63,375; 1900 population: 63,386
Charles H. Smith	Dem.		48th	1907–1908	1896–1901 1902–1911 1912–1921 Fond du Lac & Green Lake counties 1895 population: 63,375; 1900 population: 63,386
Edward H. Lyons	Rep.		49th	1909–1910	1896–1901 1902–1911 1912–1921 Fond du Lac & Green Lake counties 1895 population: 63,375; 1900 population: 63,386
Edward H. Lyons	Rep.		50th	1911–1912	1896–1901 1902–1911 1912–1921 Fond du Lac & Green Lake counties 1895 population: 63,375; 1900 population: 63,386
Lewis G. Kellogg	Dem.		51st	1913–1914	1896–1901 1902–1911 1912–1921 Fond du Lac & Green Lake counties 1895 population: 63,375; 1900 population: 63,386
Lewis G. Kellogg	Dem.		52nd	1915–1916	1896–1901 1902–1911 1912–1921 Fond du Lac & Green Lake counties 1895 population: 63,375; 1900 population: 63,386
Albert J. Pullen	Rep.		53rd	1917–1918	1896–1901 1902–1911 1912–1921 Fond du Lac & Green Lake counties 1895 population: 63,375; 1900 population: 63,386
Albert J. Pullen	Rep.		54th	1919–1920	1896–1901 1902–1911 1912–1921 Fond du Lac & Green Lake counties 1895 population: 63,375; 1900 population: 63,386
William A. Titus	Rep.		55th	1921–1922	1896–1901 1902–1911 1912–1921 Fond du Lac & Green Lake counties 1895 population: 63,375; 1900 population: 63,386
William A. Titus	Rep.		56th	1923–1924	Fond du Lac, Green Lake, and Waushara counties
William A. Titus	Rep.		57th	1925–1926	Fond du Lac, Green Lake, and Waushara counties
William A. Titus	Rep.		58th	1927–1928	Fond du Lac, Green Lake, and Waushara counties
Louis J. Fellenz Sr.	Rep.		59th	1929–1930	Fond du Lac, Green Lake, and Waushara counties
Louis J. Fellenz Sr.	Rep.		60th	1931–1932	Fond du Lac, Green Lake, and Waushara counties
Morley Garfield Kelly	Dem.		61st	1933–1934	Fond du Lac, Green Lake, and Waushara counties
Morley Garfield Kelly	Dem.		62nd	1935–1936	Fond du Lac, Green Lake, and Waushara counties
Morvin Duel	Rep.		63rd	1937–1938	Fond du Lac, Green Lake, and Waushara counties
Morvin Duel	Rep.		64th	1939–1940	Fond du Lac, Green Lake, and Waushara counties
Louis J. Fellenz Jr.	Rep.	Elected 1940. Resigned June 1944.	65th	1941–1942	Fond du Lac, Green Lake, and Waushara counties
Louis J. Fellenz Jr.	Rep.	Elected 1940. Resigned June 1944.	66th	1943–1944	Fond du Lac, Green Lake, and Waushara counties
--Vacant--			66th	1943–1944	Fond du Lac, Green Lake, and Waushara counties
Louis J. Fellenz Jr.	Rep.	Elected 1944.	67th	1945–1946	Fond du Lac, Green Lake, and Waushara counties
Louis J. Fellenz Jr.	Rep.	Elected 1944.	68th	1947–1948	Fond du Lac, Green Lake, and Waushara counties
Alfred Van De Zande	Rep.		69th	1949–1950	Fond du Lac, Green Lake, and Waushara counties
Alfred Van De Zande	Rep.		70th	1951–1952	Fond du Lac, Green Lake, and Waushara counties
Alfred Van De Zande	Rep.		71st	1953–1954	Fond du Lac, Green Lake, and Waushara counties
Alfred Van De Zande	Rep.		72nd	1955–1956	Fond du Lac, Green Lake, and Waushara counties
Walter G. Hollander	Rep.		73rd	1957–1958	Fond du Lac, Green Lake, and Waushara counties
Walter G. Hollander	Rep.		74th	1959–1960	Fond du Lac, Green Lake, and Waushara counties
Walter G. Hollander	Rep.		75th	1961–1962	Fond du Lac, Green Lake, and Waushara counties
Walter G. Hollander	Rep.		76th	1963–1964	Fond du Lac, Green Lake, and Waushara counties
Walter G. Hollander	Rep.		77th	1965–1966	Fond du Lac County and Western Dodge County
Walter G. Hollander	Rep.		78th	1967–1968	Fond du Lac County and Western Dodge County
Walter G. Hollander	Rep.		79th	1969–1970	Fond du Lac County and Western Dodge County
Walter G. Hollander	Rep.		80th	1971–1972	Fond du Lac County and Western Dodge County
Walter G. Hollander	Rep.		81st	1973–1974	Most of Dodge County; Central Fond du Lac County; Northwest Washington County; Part of Jefferson County
Walter G. Hollander	Rep.		82nd	1975–1976	Most of Dodge County; Central Fond du Lac County; Northwest Washington County; Part of Jefferson County
Scott McCallum	Rep.	Resigned 1986 after elected Lieutenant Governor of Wisconsin.	83rd	1977–1978	Most of Dodge County; Central Fond du Lac County; Northwest Washington County; Part of Jefferson County
Scott McCallum	Rep.	Resigned 1986 after elected Lieutenant Governor of Wisconsin.	84th	1979–1980	Most of Dodge County; Central Fond du Lac County; Northwest Washington County; Part of Jefferson County
Scott McCallum	Rep.	Resigned 1986 after elected Lieutenant Governor of Wisconsin.	85th	1981–1982	Most of Dodge County; Central Fond du Lac County; Northwest Washington County; Part of Jefferson County
Scott McCallum	Rep.	Resigned 1986 after elected Lieutenant Governor of Wisconsin.	86th	1983–1984	Central Fond du Lac County; Eastern Dodge County; Southern Winnebago County; Northwest Washington County
Scott McCallum	Rep.	Resigned 1986 after elected Lieutenant Governor of Wisconsin.	87th	1985–1986	Eastern Fond du Lac County; Southeast Winnebago County; Northeast Washington County; Part of Ozaukee County; Part of Sheboygan County
--Vacant--			88th	1987–1988	Eastern Fond du Lac County; Southeast Winnebago County; Northeast Washington County; Part of Ozaukee County; Part of Sheboygan County
Carol Roessler	Rep.	Won 1987 special election.	88th	1987–1988	Eastern Fond du Lac County; Southeast Winnebago County; Northeast Washington County; Part of Ozaukee County; Part of Sheboygan County
Carol Roessler	Rep.	Won 1987 special election.	89th	1989–1990	Eastern Fond du Lac County; Southeast Winnebago County; Northeast Washington County; Part of Ozaukee County; Part of Sheboygan County
Carol Roessler	Rep.	Won 1987 special election.	90th	1991–1992	Eastern Fond du Lac County; Southeast Winnebago County; Northeast Washington County; Part of Ozaukee County; Part of Sheboygan County
Carol Roessler	Rep.	Won 1987 special election.	91st	1993–1994	Central Fond du Lac County; Southeast Winnebago County; Parts of Dodge County
Carol Roessler	Rep.	Won 1987 special election.	92nd	1995–1996	Central Fond du Lac County; Southeast Winnebago County; Parts of Dodge County
Carol Roessler	Rep.	Won 1987 special election.	93rd	1997–1998	Central Fond du Lac County; Southeast Winnebago County; Parts of Dodge County
Carol Roessler	Rep.	Won 1987 special election.	94th	1999–2000	Central Fond du Lac County; Southeast Winnebago County; Parts of Dodge County
Carol Roessler	Rep.	Won 1987 special election.	95th	2001–2002	Central Fond du Lac County; Southeast Winnebago County; Parts of Dodge County
Carol Roessler	Rep.	Won 1987 special election.	96th	2003–2004	Central Fond du Lac County; Southern Winnebago County; Part of Dodge County
Carol Roessler	Rep.	Won 1987 special election.	97th	2005–2006	Central Fond du Lac County; Southern Winnebago County; Part of Dodge County
Carol Roessler	Rep.	Won 1987 special election.	98th	2007–2008	Central Fond du Lac County; Southern Winnebago County; Part of Dodge County
Randy Hopper	Rep.	Lost 2011 recall election.	99th	2009–2010	Central Fond du Lac County; Southern Winnebago County; Part of Dodge County
Randy Hopper	Rep.	Lost 2011 recall election.	100th	2011–2012	Central Fond du Lac County; Southern Winnebago County; Part of Dodge County
Jessica King	Dem.	Won 2011 recall election.	100th	2011–2012	Central Fond du Lac County; Southern Winnebago County; Part of Dodge County
Rick Gudex	Rep.		101st	2013–2014	Central Fond du Lac County, southern Winnebago County, & part of Dodge County: Fond du Lac County; Town of Byron; Town of Eldorado; Town of Empire; Town of Fond du Lac; Town of Friendship; Town of Lamartine; Town of Oakfield; Town of Rosendale; Town of Springvale; Town of Taycheedah; Town of Waupun; Village of North Fond du Lac; Village of Oakfield; Village of Rosendale; City of Fond du Lac; City of Waupun; Western ward, Town of Calumet; Winnebago County; Town of Algoma; Town of Black Wolf; Town of Nekimi; Town of Nepeuskun; Town of Omro; Town of Oshkosh; Town of Rushford; Town of Utica; City of Omro; City of Oshkosh; Dodge County; City of Waupun
Rick Gudex	Rep.		102nd	2015–2016	
Dan Feyen	Rep.		103rd	2017–2018	
Dan Feyen	Rep.		104th	2019–2020	
Dan Feyen	Rep.		105th	2021–2022	
Dan Feyen	Rep.		106th	2023–2024	Central Fond du Lac County, southern Winnebago County, part of Dodge County
Kristin Dassler-Alfheim	Dem.	Elected 2024.	107th	2025–2026	Part of eastern Winnebago County part of southern Outagamie County
