= Senator Fellenz =

Senator Fellenz may refer to:

- L. J. Fellenz (1882–1941), Wisconsin State Senate
- Louis J. Fellenz Jr. (1915–1993), Wisconsin State Senate
