= Edward H. Lyons =

American politician

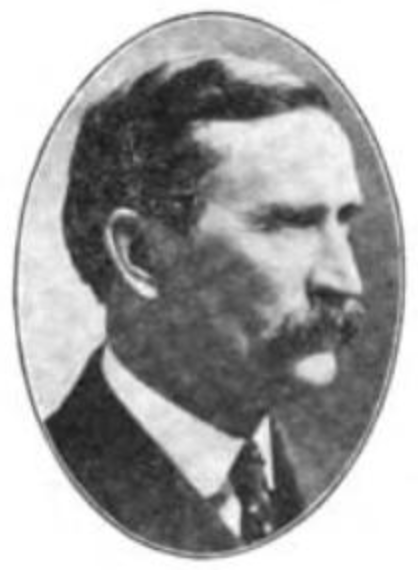

Member of the Wisconsin Senate from the 18th district
- In office January 4, 1909 – January 6, 1913
- Preceded by: Charles H. Smith
- Succeeded by: Lewis G. Kellogg

Personal details
- Born: December 22, 1855 Athens County, Ohio
- Died: January 17, 1920 (aged 64) Fond du Lac, Wisconsin
- Party: Republican
- Occupation: Businessman, farmer, politician

Edward H. Lyons (December 22, 1855 – January 17, 1920) was an American businessman, farmer, and politician.

== Biography ==
Born in Athens County, Ohio, Lyons moved with his parents to Wisconsin in 1856.

In 1885, he started a mercantile business in Eden, Fond du Lac County, Wisconsin. From 1903 to 1907, he served as Fond du Lac County treasurer. He then retired from the mercantile business and became involved with the manufacture of lime. Lyons served as president of the Standard Stone & Lime Company and the Badger Pressed Brick Company with the home offices located in Fond du Lac. He lived in Fond du Lac.

From 1909 to 1913, Lyons served in the Wisconsin State Senate and was a Republican.

He died in Fond du Lac or in Valders, Wisconsin.
