= Albert J. Pullen =

American politician (1861–1937)

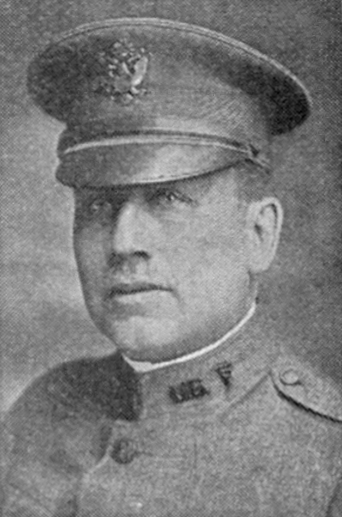

Member of the Wisconsin Senate from the 18th district
- In office January 1, 1917 – January 3, 1921
- Preceded by: Lewis G. Kellogg
- Succeeded by: William A. Titus

Personal details
- Born: Albert John Pullen; November 1, 1861 Windham County, Vermont, US
- Died: December 6, 1937 (aged 76) Fond du Lac, Wisconsin, US
- Party: Republican
- Education: University of Vermont; Sewanee: The University of the South

Albert John Pullen (November 1, 1861 – December 6, 1937) was a member of the Wisconsin State Senate.

== Early life and education ==
Pullen was born in Windham County, Vermont on November 1, 1861. (Note: Sources name various towns, such as Brattleboro, Grafton, and Putney. Some also give his birth year as 1863.) He attended the University of Vermont and Sewanee: The University of the South. Pullen moved to North Fond du Lac, Wisconsin in 1900. He later became president of the local humane society. During World War I, Pullen served as an officer in the United States Army Medical Corps. He died in Fond du Lac on December 6, 1937.

== Political career ==
Pullen was elected to the Senate in 1916. Previously, he had served as President of North Fond du Lac and of the North Fond du Lac School Board, as well as Treasurer of Fond du Lac County, Wisconsin. In 1920, he was a candidate for Lieutenant Governor of Wisconsin, losing to George Comings. Pullen was a Republican.
