= Elmer D. Morse =

American politician

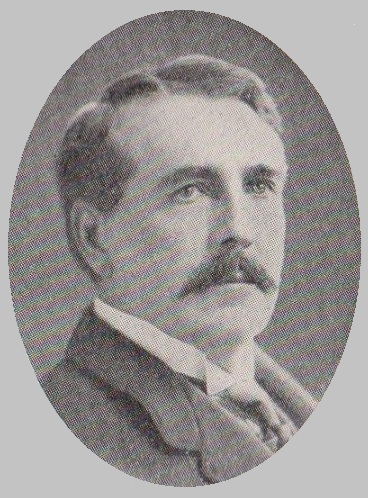

Member of the Wisconsin Senate from the 18th district
- In office January 7, 1901 – January 2, 1905
- Preceded by: Lyman W. Thayer
- Succeeded by: Charles H. Smith

Personal details
- Born: April 6, 1844 Madison, New York
- Died: February 13, 1921 (aged 76)
- Party: Republican
- Profession: Politician

Elmer D. Morse (April 6, 1844 – February 13, 1921) was a Republican member of the Wisconsin State Senate.

== Biography ==
Morse was born in Madison, New York on April 6, 1844. He came to Princeton, Wisconsin with his parents at the age of three.

He entered the Army at the age of 16 in 1861, serving four years, and attending school for one year after being discharged. He was later employed in the lumber, grain, and produce business. At the organization of the Princeton State Bank in 1893, he was elected vice-president. When the Montello State Bank was organized a few years later, he became its president. While he had always taken an active part in politics, he had never held a political office, until he was elected to the Wisconsin State Senate. Morse died on February 13, 1921.
