= Springvale, Wisconsin =

Springvale is the name of some places in the U.S. state of Wisconsin:

- Springvale, Columbia County, Wisconsin, a town
- Springvale, Fond du Lac County, Wisconsin, a town
