= Morvin Duel =

20th century American politician

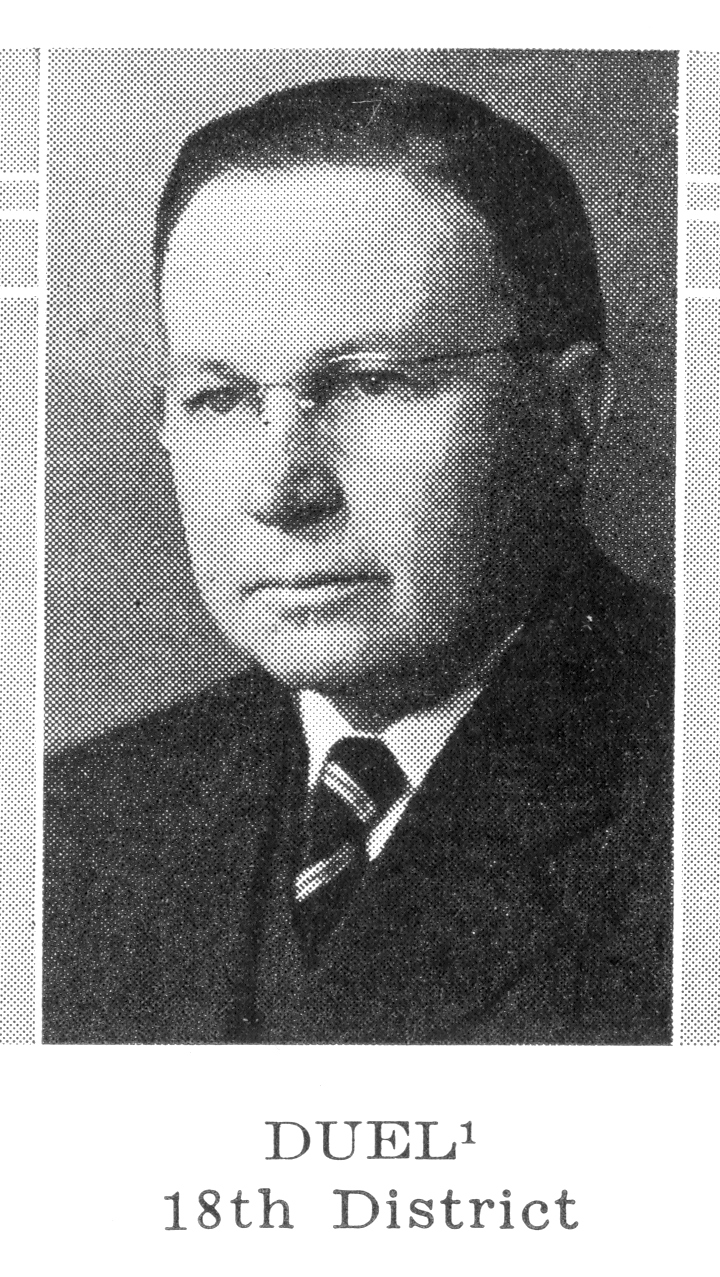

15th Commissioner of Insurance of Wisconsin
- In office September 20, 1939 – August 18, 1948
- Appointed by: Julius P. Heil; Walter Samuel Goodland; Oscar Rennebohm
- Preceded by: H. J. Mortensen
- Succeeded by: John R. Lange

Member of the Wisconsin Senate from the 18th district
- In office January 1937 – September 20, 1939
- Preceded by: Morley Garfield Kelly
- Succeeded by: Louis J. Fellenz Jr.

Personal details
- Born: July 8, 1888 Eldorado, Wisconsin, U.S.
- Died: August 18, 1948 (aged 60) Madison, Wisconsin, U.S.
- Party: Republican
- Spouse: married
- Children: at least 1 son
- Education: Oshkosh State Teachers College
- Occupation: Educator, insurance broker

Morvin M. Duel (July 8, 1888 – August 18, 1948) was an American educator, businessman, and Republican politician. He was the 15th insurance commissioner of the state of Wisconsin, and served four years in the Wisconsin State Senate.

== Early life and education ==
Duel was born on July 8, 1888, in the town of Eldorado, in Fond du Lac County, Wisconsin. He graduated from high school in Rosendale, Wisconsin, and earned his bachelor's degree from the Oshkosh State Teachers College in 1910.

== Career ==
He worked for some time as a teacher before going into the insurance business. He was superintendent of schools of Fond du Lac County from 1915 to 1921. In 1936, he was elected on the Republican Party ticket to the Wisconsin State Senate, representing Wisconsin's 18th State Senate district. The 18th Senate district then comprised Fond du Lac, Green Lake, and Waushara counties.

He resigned his Senate seat in September 1939 when he was appointed insurance commissioner for the state of Wisconsin by Governor Julius P. Heil. He was subsequently re-appointed in 1943 by Walter Samuel Goodland, and in 1947 by Oscar Rennebohm. He served in this office until his death.

He died at his home in Madison, Wisconsin, on August 18, 1948, following a short illness.

Wisconsin Senate
Preceded by Morley Garfield Kelly	Member of the Wisconsin Senate from the 18th district January 4, 1937 – September 20, 1939	Succeeded by Louis J. Fellenz Jr.
Government offices
Preceded by H. J. Mortensen	Commissioner of Insurance of Wisconsin; September 20, 1939 – August 18, 1948	Succeeded by John R. Lange
