= John Fellenz =

American politician (1833–1896)

Member of the Wisconsin State Assembly from the Milwaukee 8th district
- In office January 1, 1883 – January 5, 1885
- Preceded by: Francis J. Borchardt
- Succeeded by: Frank Haderer
- In office January 1, 1872 – January 6, 1873
- Preceded by: John L. Semmann
- Succeeded by: Galen Seaman

Member of the Wisconsin State Assembly from the Milwaukee 5th district
- In office January 6, 1868 – January 2, 1871
- Preceded by: Truman H. Judd
- Succeeded by: Charles F. Freeman

Personal details
- Born: Johann Fellenz; June 23, 1833 Bengel, Rhine Province, Kingdom of Prussia
- Died: December 16, 1896 (aged 63) Milwaukee, Wisconsin, U.S.
- Resting place: Holy Trinity Cemetery, Milwaukee
- Party: Democratic
- Spouse: Anna Katharina Ruhland (m. 1855–1896)
- Children: Elizabeth Fellenz^{(b. 1855; died 1875)}; John Fellenz^{(b. 1857; died 1900)}; Christine (Hinsenkamp)^{(b. 1859; died 1918)}; Lorenz J. Fellenz^{(b. 1866; died 1938)}; Anna Josephine (Melcher)^{(b. 1868; died 1936)}; Frank William Fellenz^{(b. 1874; died 1933)}; Catherine Mary (Gresbach)^{(b. 1876; died 1952)}; Mary Mathilda Fellenz^{(b. 1878; died 1881)}; Lucille Fellenz^{(b. 1880)}
- Relatives: Louis J. Fellenz Sr. (grandnephew); Louis J. Fellenz Jr. (great-grandnephew)
- Occupation: Building contractor

Johann "John" Fellenz (June 23, 1833 – December 16, 1896) was a German American immigrant, building contractor, and Wisconsin pioneer. He was a member of the Wisconsin State Assembly, representing the southwest side of the city of Milwaukee for five terms. He was also one of the contractors for the construction of the Winnebago Mental Health Institute.

== Biography ==
Fellenz was born in the municipality of Bengel, in what's now western Germany, in June 1833. Sources have differed on the exact date. At the time of his birth, this area was the Rhine Province of the Kingdom of Prussia. As a child, he emigrated to the United States with his parents and settled in the town of Farmington, Washington County, in the Wisconsin Territory, in 1847. At age 18, he moved to the city of Milwaukee, where he worked as a carpenter and builder.

He was one of the earliest settlers in the southwest side of the city of Milwaukee, in what was the 8th ward for most of his life. He was active throughout his life with the Democratic Party of Wisconsin. He was elected to three consecutive terms in the Wisconsin State Assembly in 1867, 1868, and 1869, running on the Democratic Party ticket. He represented Milwaukee County's 5th Assembly district, which then comprised the 5th and 8th wards of the city. He was not a candidate in 1870. During this time he was a contractor on the construction of the Female College in Madison, Wisconsin, and Winnebago Mental Health Institute—then known as the "Northern State Hospital for the Insane"—in Oshkosh, Wisconsin.

He was elected to another term in 1871, after redistricting, in the new Milwaukee 8th Assembly district, which comprised just the 8th ward. He did not run again in 1872, but was an unsuccessful candidate in 1873.

He subsequently took on more important construction jobs in Wisconsin, including the 1875 Science Hall at the University of Wisconsin, which burned to the ground in 1884. He worked on the Notre Dame Convent, St. Joseph's Hospital, as well as several churches, schools, and a Jewish temple.

He was elected to his final term in the Assembly in 1882.

He died on December 16, 1896, in Milwaukee, Wisconsin.

== Personal life and family ==
John Fellenz was the eldest of at least six children born to Johann "Peter" Fellenz and his wife Anna Margaretha (née Feiten). His younger brother, Joseph, remained in Washington County, Wisconsin. Joseph's grandson, Louis J. Fellenz, Sr., and great-grandson, Louis J. Fellenz, Jr., both served in the Wisconsin State Senate in the 20th century.

John Fellenz married Anna Katharina Ruhland, another German immigrant, at Menomonee Falls, Wisconsin, on February 6, 1855. They had at least nine children, though at least two died young. Their son Frank Fellenz became a successful businessman in Milwaukee.

== Electoral history ==
=== Wisconsin Assembly (1871) ===
Wisconsin Assembly, Milwaukee 8th District Election, 1871
Party	Candidate	Votes	%	±%
General Election, November 7, 1871
Democratic	John Fellenz	382	55.36%	−14.38%
Republican	Truman H. Judd	308	44.64%	
Plurality		74	10.72%	-28.77%
Total votes		690	100.0%	-49.82%
Democratic hold				

=== Wisconsin Assembly (1873) ===
Wisconsin Assembly, Milwaukee 8th District Election, 1873
Party	Candidate	Votes	%	±%
General Election, November 4, 1873
Liberal Republican	Frederick Vogel	817	59.68%	
Reform	John Fellenz	552	40.32%	−7.91%
Plurality		265	19.36%	+15.82%
Total votes		1,369	100.0%	+30.75%
Liberal Republican gain from Republican				

=== Wisconsin Assembly (1882) ===
Wisconsin Assembly, Milwaukee 8th District Election, 1882
Party	Candidate	Votes	%	±%
General Election, November 7, 1882
Democratic	John Fellenz	1,360	58.24%	−22.09%
Republican	Thomas H. Wood	975	41.76%	+26.51%
Plurality		385	16.49%	-52.44%
Total votes		2,335	100.0%	+31.92%
Democratic hold				
