= Nicholas J. Lesselyoung =

American politician

Nicholas J. Lesselyoung (November 25, 1917 – July 21, 1987) was a member of the Wisconsin State Assembly.

== Biography ==
Lesselyoung was born on November 25, 1917, in Chilton, Wisconsin. He graduated from Chilton High School and Marquette University Law School. During World War II, he served in the United States Navy. He died on July 21, 1987.

== Political career ==
Lesselyoung was elected to the Assembly in 1950. He was a Republican.

Wisconsin State Assembly
Preceded by Myrton H. Duel	Member of the Wisconsin State Assembly from the 1st Fond du Lac County district 1951–1957	Succeeded by Earl F. McEssy
