= Eldorado (community), Wisconsin =

Eldorado, Wisconsin
- Unincorporated community
- Location within Wisconsin Location within the United States
- Coordinates: 43°49′29″N 88°37′18″W
- Country: United States
- State: Wisconsin
- County: Fond du Lac
- Elevation: 879 ft (268 m)
- Time zone: UTC-6 (Central (CST))
  - Summer (DST): UTC-5 (CDT)
- ZIP code: 54932
- Area code: 920
- GNIS feature ID: 1564499

Eldorado is an unincorporated community located in the town of Eldorado, Fond du Lac County, Wisconsin, United States. Eldorado is 2.5 miles (4.0 km) east-northeast of Rosendale and has a post office with ZIP code 54932.

== History ==
The post office opened in 1856 as North Lamartine. The name changed to Eldorado Mills in 1870 and finally to Eldorado in 1883. Note that there was another post office named El Dorado until 1882, located about 3.5 miles north and east of this post office. It was renamed Kirkwood PO 1882-1899.
