= Samuel M. Smead =

American newspaper editor and politician

Member of the Wisconsin Senate from the 18th district
- In office January 2, 1893 – January 7, 1895
- Preceded by: Samuel B. Stanchfield
- Succeeded by: Lyman Wellington Thayer

Personal details
- Born: June 11, 1830 Troy, Pennsylvania
- Died: April 28, 1898 (aged 67) Fond du Lac, Wisconsin
- Resting place: Rosendale Cemetery, Fond du Lac, Wisconsin
- Party: Democratic
- Occupation: Newspaper editor, Politician

Samuel McKuen Smead (June 11, 1830 – April 28, 1898) was an American newspaper editor and politician.

== Formative years ==
Born in Troy, Pennsylvania on June 11, 1830, Smead moved to the Wisconsin Territory in 1846 and settled in Fond du Lac County.

In 1853, he became the publisher of the newspaper the Fond du Lac Press. He was also active with mercantile and real estate businesses.

== Public service career ==
President Andrew Johnson appointed Smead assessor of internal revenue. President Grover Cleveland also appointed Smead postmaster for Fond du Lac, Wisconsin.

In 1893, Smead was elected to the Wisconsin State Senate and was a Democrat.

Shortly after the murder of his son, Fred B. Smead (1863–1895), in Chicago, Smead resigned from his position as senator and was replaced by Lyman Wellington Thayer.

== Death ==
Smead died at his home in Fond du Lac, Wisconsin on April 28, 1898.
