= Myrton H. Duel =

American politician

Myrton H. Duel (January 26, 1891 – March 16, 1962) was a member of the Wisconsin State Assembly.

Duel was born on January 26, 1891, in Eldorado, Wisconsin. He served in the United States Army during World War I. He married Matie Tidyman (1899–1990) in 1923. He was elected in 1948 as a member of the Republican Party, defeating Marley G. Kelly. He died in Fond du Lac, Wisconsin on March 16, 1962, and was buried at North Eldorado Cemetery.

Wisconsin State Assembly
Preceded by William J. Nuss	Member of the Wisconsin State Assembly from the 1st Fond du Lac County district 1947–1951	Succeeded by Nicholas J. Lesselyoung
