= William J. Nuss =

20th century American lawyer and politician

William John Nuss Jr. (June 12, 1914 – October 28, 1991) was a lawyer and politician.

Born in Sheboygan, Wisconsin, Nuss grew up in Fond du Lac, Wisconsin. He went to University of Notre Dame and then received his law degree from Marquette University Law School. Nuss practiced law in Fond du Lac. From 1941 until 1947, Nuss served in the Wisconsin State Assembly and was a Republican. He was named a national director of the American Automobile Association in 1967.

== Notes ==
Wisconsin State Assembly
Preceded by Maurice J. Fitzsimons Jr.	Member of the Wisconsin State Assembly from the 1st Fond du Lac County district 1941–1947	Succeeded by Myrton H. Duel
