= Samuel B. Stanchfield =

American politician

Samuel Stanchfield

Member of the Wisconsin Senate from the 18th district
- In office January 7, 1889 – January 2, 1893
- Preceded by: James Franklin Ware
- Succeeded by: Samuel M. Smead

Member of the Wisconsin State Assembly from the Fond du Lac 2nd district
- In office January 5, 1885 – January 3, 1887
- Preceded by: James Franklin Ware
- Succeeded by: Gaines A. Knapp

Personal details
- Born: March 17, 1837 Leeds, Maine, U.S.
- Died: March 10, 1919 (aged 81) Fond du Lac, Wisconsin, U.S.
- Party: Republican

Samuel B. Stanchfield (March 17, 1837 – March 10, 1919) was an American politician and farmer who served as a member of the Wisconsin State Assembly and the Wisconsin Senate.

== Early life ==
Stanchfield was born on March 17, 1837, in Leeds, Maine. He moved to Fond du Lac, Wisconsin, in 1855.

== Career ==
Stanchfield served as a member of the Senate from 1888 to 1892. Previously, he had been a member of the Assembly from 1886 and 1886. Additionally, Stanchfield was chairman of the Fond du Lac Town Board, clerk of Fond du Lac, and chairman of the Fond du Lac County, Wisconsin Board. He was a Republican.

== Personal life ==
Stanchfield died in Fond du Lac on March 10, 1919.
