= Milwaukee–Watertown Plank Road =

Plank road important to the early development of southeastern Wisconsin

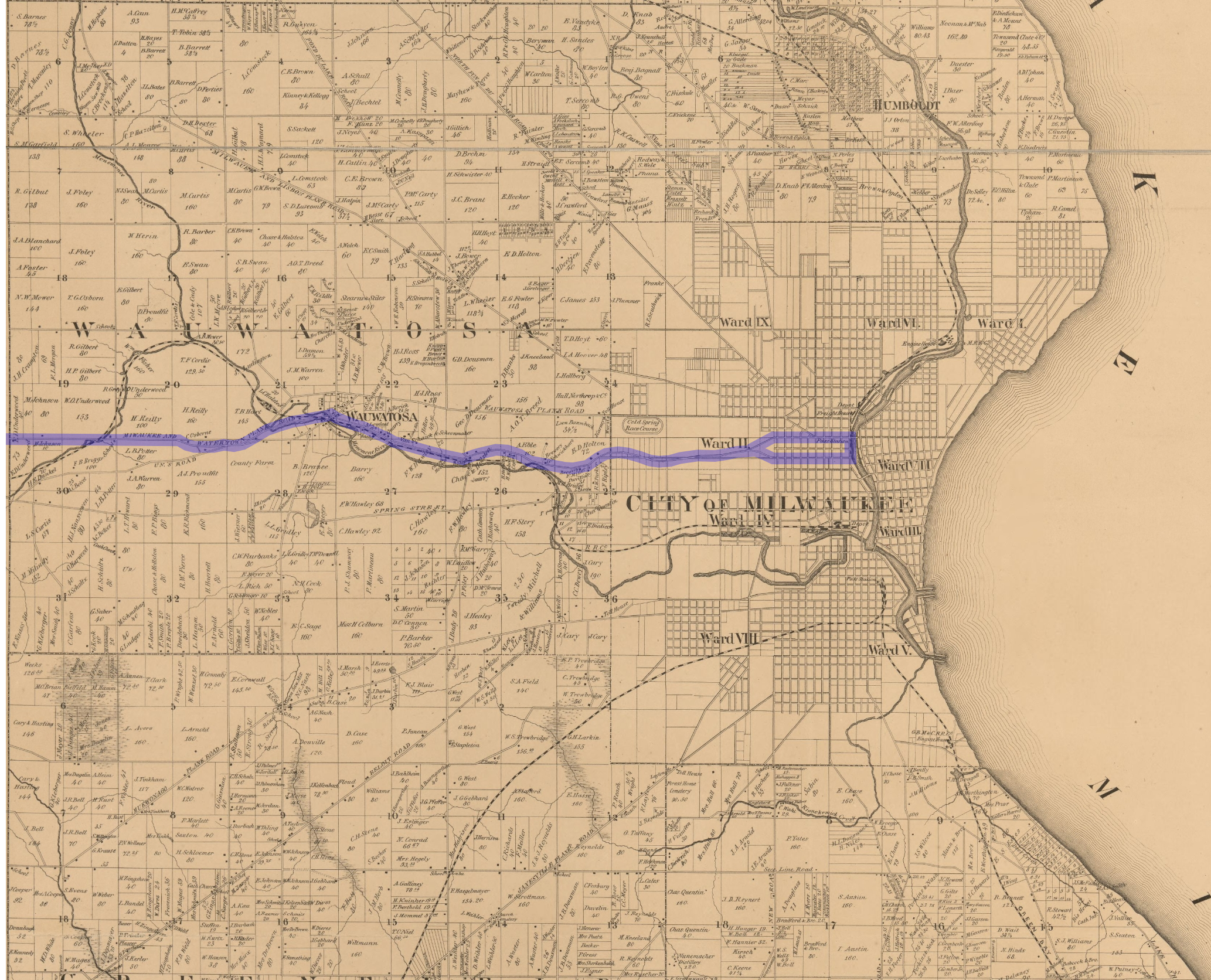
- Milwaukee-Watertown Plank Road in 1858.

Route information
- Length: 58 mi (93 km)
- Existed: 1853–present

Major junctions
- East end: Milwaukee
- West end: Watertown

The Milwaukee–Watertown Plank Road, known more commonly in the modern era as the Watertown Plank Road, was a plank road important to the early development of southeastern Wisconsin, especially to its terminal cities Milwaukee and Watertown, in the period shortly after statehood. Construction began in 1848 and it was completed in 1853. According to former Watertown Daily Times editor Tom Schultz, portions of the plank road extended past Watertown to the Town of Portland:

My Hubbleton friend said he could remember probably back in the 1950s when highway 19 was being reconstruced in the Hubbleton area, that under the pavement, construction crews found remnants of the old Plank Road. Many of the planks were still there. That certainly confirmed that the road went west of Watertown quite a ways. An early manuscript by James A. Sheridan said the “foundation for a prosperous village (Portland) was laid around 1850 which was on the line of the Milwaukee and Watertown Plank Road.”

In early frontier Wisconsin there were no roads or railroads. There were trails, which were expanded into wagon roads. In good conditions they bumped over barely-covered stumps; when it was wet they were churned into strings of mud-holes. In the 1840s the ideas of railroads and plank roads swept the state and the state granted charters for companies to raise money to build the roads and then collect tolls on them. In 1848, with growing pressure to improve the road from Milwaukee to Watertown, the Watertown Chronicle expressed dissatisfaction with the state of the old non-plank stage road:

The stage road for some weeks past should form a powerful appeal to farmers and traders in favor of the plank road from this place to Milwaukee. The going has never been worse. The road from one end of the line to the other is lined with fragments of wagons, barrels of flour, boxes of goods, etc. The price of freight has more than doubled.

The original incorporators of the company which built the road were Elisha Eldred, Hans Crocker, Joshua Hathaway and Eliphalet Cramer, with Eldred as the first President. The terms of the company's charter allowed them to charge a toll, and they made as much as $1300 per week on an initial construction investment of $119,000. It was heavily used until the completion of the Watertown Railroad in 1855.

Truman H. Judd, later a Milwaukee industrialist and state legislator, was the principal contractor, and served as the road's superintendent for four years after he completed construction.
