= L. J. Fellenz =

American politician and judge (1882–1953)

The Honorable Louis J. Fellenz

Wisconsin Circuit Court Judge for the 18th Circuit
- In office 1943 – January 1, 1953
- Appointed by: Walter Samuel Goodland
- Preceded by: Clayton F. Van Pelt
- Succeeded by: Russell E. Hanson

Member of the Wisconsin Senate from the 18th district
- In office January 1, 1929 – January 1, 1933
- Preceded by: William A. Titus
- Succeeded by: Morley Garfield Kelly

District Attorney of Fond du Lac County
- In office January 1, 1915 – January 1, 1919
- Preceded by: Thomas C. Downs
- Succeeded by: James Murray

Personal details
- Born: Louis John Fellenz; November 29, 1882 Ashford, Wisconsin
- Died: January 1, 1953 (aged 70) Fond du Lac, Wisconsin
- Resting place: Rienzi Cemetery; Fond du Lac, Wisconsin
- Party: Republican
- Spouses: Erma Emma Tabor; (m. 1914)
- Children: Louis J. Fellenz Jr.^{(b. 1915; died 1993)}; Elizabeth (Meyst)^{(b. 1918; died 2009)}; 1 other daughter
- Parents: Mathias Joseph Fellenz (father); Susan (Beringer) Fellenz (mother)
- Relatives: John Fellenz (granduncle)
- Education: University of Wisconsin Law School

Louis John Fellenz Sr. (November 29, 1882 – January 1, 1953) was an American lawyer, politician, and judge from Wisconsin. He was district attorney of Fond du Lac County for four years, was a member of the Wisconsin Senate, and was a Wisconsin circuit court judge for the last nine years of his life.

== Early life and career ==
Fellenz was born on November 29, 1882, in Ashford, Wisconsin, in Fond du Lac County. He attended school in Campbellsport, Wisconsin, before graduating from Oshkosh State Normal School in 1902. He taught school for two years before attending the University of Wisconsin Law School, where he received his LL.B. in 1907. He practiced law in Fort Atkinson for 3 years, then moved his practice to Fond du Lac.

== Public office ==
In 1914 he was elected District Attorney of Fond du Lac County, running as a Republican. He was re-elected in 1916, and left office in January 1919. He returned to his law practice until 1928, when he was elected to represent Fond du Lac County in the Wisconsin State Senate for a four-year term. In the senate, he was chairman of the interim committee on the courts, and also served on the committees on fire insurance and guardianship. He was not a candidate for re-election in 1932.

Fellenz continued his law practice until he was appointed, in 1943, as a Wisconsin Circuit Court Judge for the Fond du Lac-based 18th Circuit, replacing the retiring Judge Clayton F. Van Pelt. He was re-elected without opposition in 1947, but died in January 1953, before the end of his 2nd term.

== Family and personal life ==
Louis Fellenz married Erma E. Tabor in 1914. They had one son and two daughters, who all survived him. His son, Louis J. Fellenz, Jr., also went on to serve as a member of the Senate, representing the same district as his father.

Fellenz was an avid hunter and golfer and a baseball enthusiast.

== Electoral history ==
=== Wisconsin Senate (1928) ===
Wisconsin Senate, 18th District Election, 1928
Party	Candidate	Votes	%	±%
General Election, November 6, 1928
Republican	Louis J. Fellenz	21,550	65.24%	
Democratic	J. J. Gough	11,483	34.76%	
Total votes		33,033	100.0%	
Republican hold				

=== Wisconsin Circuit Court (1947) ===
Wisconsin Circuit Court, 18th Circuit Election, 1947
Party	Candidate	Votes	%	±%
General Election, April 1, 1947
Independent	Louis J. Fellenz	22,702	100.0%	
Total votes		22,702	100.0%	

Legal offices
Preceded by Clayton F. Van Pelt	Wisconsin Circuit Court Judge for the 18th Circuit; 1943 – 1953	Succeeded by Russell E. Hanson
