= Truman H. Judd =

American politician

Truman H. Judd (October 27, 1817 – May 9, 1884) was an American businessman, contractor, manufacturer and railroad executive from Milwaukee, Wisconsin who served in the Wisconsin State Assembly as a Republican, and in his later years was active in the Greenback Party.

== Background ==
Judd was born in Milton, New York, in Saratoga County, New York, on October 27, 1817. With his family he was moved to Chemung County, New York when he was eleven. The family remained there several years, allowing Truman to witnessing the construction of the Chemung Canal. He was educated in the public schools of New York.

He lived for a time in Buffalo, and from that city he set out for Illinois in the spring of 1836, attracted to the West by what he had heard of its resources. He first visited Chicago, then a mere village showing little promise of future greatness. After a little time in Chicago, he continued on to Wisconsin Territory, only recently divided from Michigan Territory, and having traveled for some time through that region he returned to his native state. Two years later, having reached 21, he engaged in business on his own account as a contractor on the Genesee Valley Canal.

== Coming to and building Wisconsin ==
In 1843, he moved to Wisconsin and continued to operate as a public works contractor in that state. In 1844, he began building a turnpike road from Milwaukee to Muskego (a distance of twelve miles) funded by subscriptions of citizens of Milwaukee and the region interested in the improvement. Judd completed it in 1845, being the first highway from Milwaukee into the interior of the Territory. Soon after completing this project he moved on to Dodge County, where he built a sawmill and cleared virgin land which he developed into a farm.

In 1850, he was chosen superintendent of the Milwaukee-Watertown Plank Road, and moved again, this time to Hartland, where he lived during 1850–1851, while supervising the construction of the plank road, and for another four years while he served as manager thereof. He left this position in 1856 and moved to Milwaukee and went into the lumber business, which he was to follow successfully until 1879. In addition to constructing some of the earliest public highways in Wisconsin, he was also one of the builders of the Milwaukee & Watertown Railway (one of the first railroads in the state, eventually to become part of the Chicago, Milwaukee, St. Paul and Pacific Railroad). As early as 1854, he had constructed two bridges over the Rock River on this line, and was afterward connected for a time with the business management of the railroad.

== Political office ==
Judd was a firm believer in the principles of the Republican Party which arose in Wisconsin soon after he came there. In 1866, he was elected as a member of the "Union Party", as Republicans were known at that time, to the State Assembly, to represent Milwaukee County's 5th Assembly district (the 5th and 8th Wards of the City of Milwaukee), succeeding Democrat Charles H. Orton. He served on the standing committee on incorporations. (It is not clear whether he was at all related to Stoddard Judd, who during this same period was a member of the Wisconsin State Senate from Dodge County, where Truman Judd had created his farm.) He was succeeded the next year by another Democrat, John Fellenz.

== After the Assembly ==
In addition to his lumber business, he also went into partnership with John Hiles to manufacture window sashes, doors and window blinds. In 1871 Judd had a brick business block built in downtown Milwaukee at the corner of Clybourn Avenue and West Water Street. In the later years of his life Judd did not agree with the financial policies of the Republican Party, and in 1878 he ran as the candidate of the Greenback Party for Congress from the Milwaukee district, polling 1,351 (5.74% of the vote, to 11,157 (47.42%) for Democrat Peter V. Deuster and 11,022 (46.84%) for Republican Leander F. Frisby.

In 1879 he retired from active business other than the care of his estate; after 1880 impaired health caused him to reside much of the time in California. He died in San Jose, California on May 9, 1884.
