= Lyman Wellington Thayer =

American politician (1854-1919)

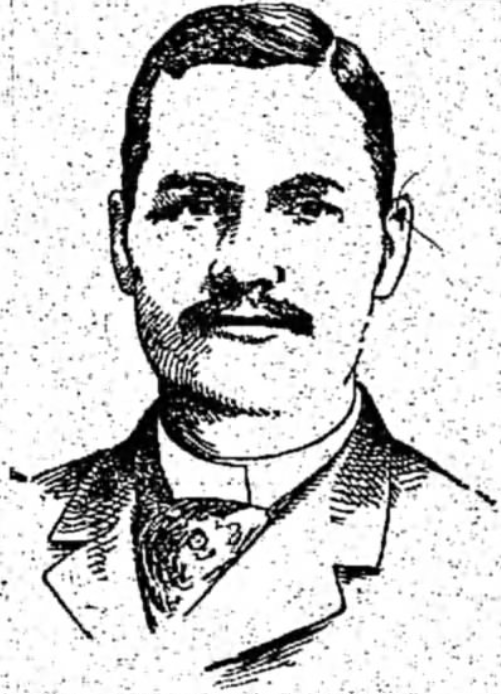

38th Mayor of Ripon, Wisconsin
- In office April 1916 – April 1918
- Preceded by: Albert Maudlin
- Succeeded by: Charles H. Graham

Member of the Wisconsin Senate from the 18th district
- In office January 7, 1895 – January 7, 1901
- Preceded by: Samuel M. Smead
- Succeeded by: Elmer D. Morse

Member of the Wisconsin State Assembly from the Fond du Lac 1st district
- In office January 2, 1893 – January 7, 1895
- Preceded by: Frank Bowe
- Succeeded by: Frank L. Bacon

Personal details
- Born: October 30, 1854 Wausau, Wisconsin, U.S.
- Died: February 8, 1919 (aged 64) Ripon, Wisconsin, U.S.
- Resting place: Pine Grove Cemetery, Wausau, Wisconsin
- Party: Republican
- Spouse: Rosetta Jane Single
- Children: Lulu Jane Thayer^{(b. 1879; died 1910)}; Annie R. (Davis)^{(b. 1881; died 1965)}; Benjamin Single Thayer^{(b. 1883; died 1967)}; Ellen Eugenia Thayer^{(b. 1890; died 1894)}; Donald Boswell Thayer^{(b. 1898; died 1965)}
- Education: Jones' Commercial College, St. Louis
- Occupation: Farmer, politician

Lyman Wellington Thayer (October 30, 1854 – February 8, 1919) was an American farmer and Republican politician from the U.S. state of Wisconsin. He was the 38th mayor of Ripon, Wisconsin, (1916–1918) and represented Fond du Lac County in the Wisconsin State Senate and Assembly during the 1890s.

== Biography ==
Thayer was born on October 30, 1854, in Wausau, Wisconsin. He moved to Ripon, Wisconsin, in 1886. Thayer died in Ripon on February 8, 1919.

== Career ==
Thayer was Chairman of Ripon and of the Fond du Lac County, Wisconsin Board of Supervisors. He was elected to the Assembly in 1892 and to the Senate in 1894. After leaving the Senate, he served as mayor of Ripon from 1916 to 1918. Thayer was a Republican.
