= Green Lake (town), Wisconsin =

Green Lake, Wisconsin
- Town
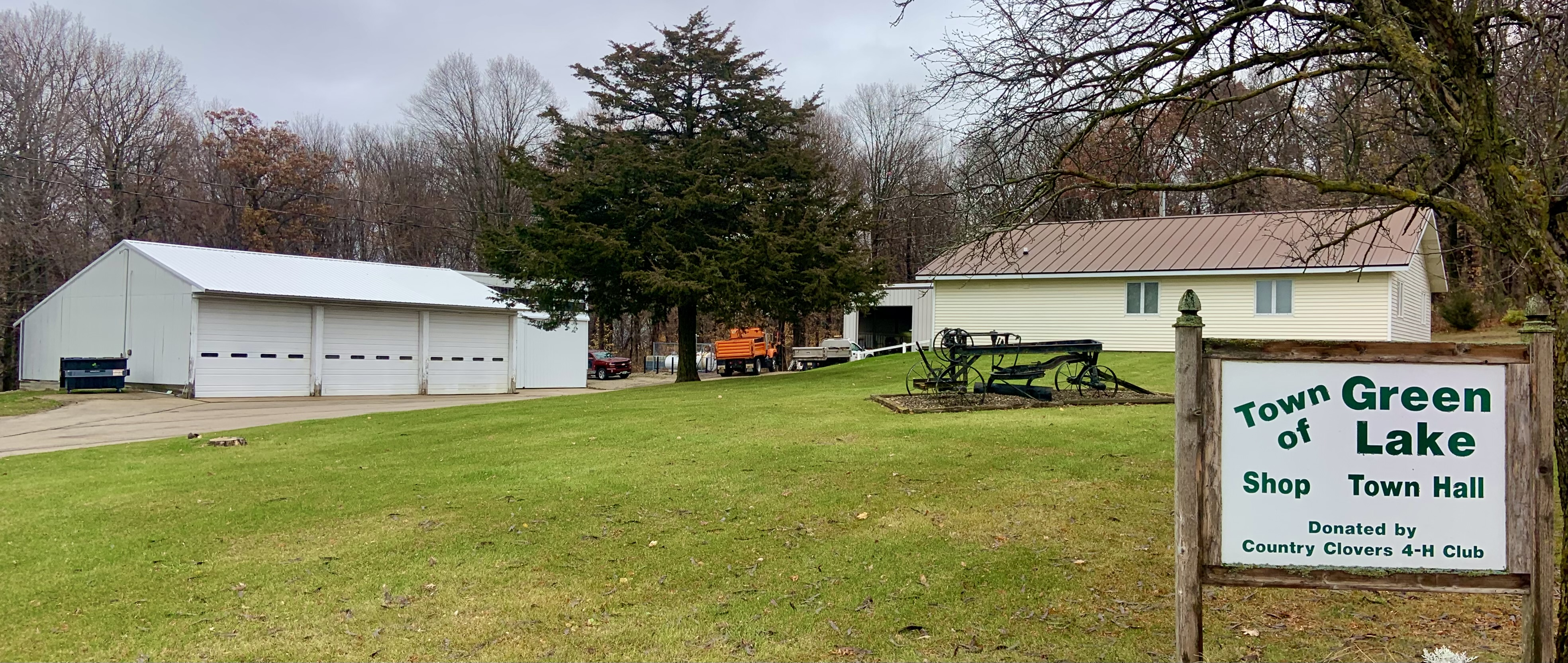
- Town hall

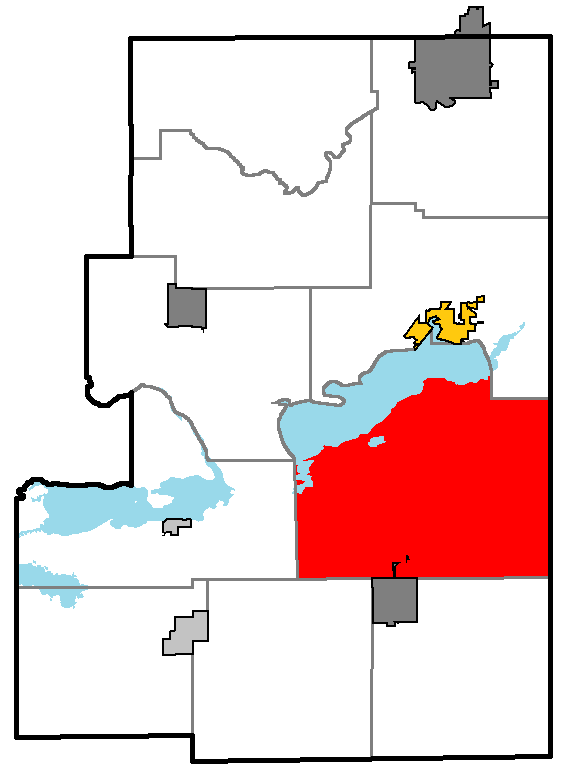
- Location of the town of Green Lake, Wisconsin

- Location of Green Lake County, Wisconsin
- Coordinates: 43°47′4″N 88°57′57″W
- Country: United States
- State: Wisconsin
- County: Green Lake

Area
  - Total: 48.6 sq mi (125.8 km^{2})
  - Land: 47.2 sq mi (122.3 km^{2})
  - Water: 1.4 sq mi (3.5 km^{2})
- Elevation: 1,020 ft (311 m)

Population (2020)
  - Total: 1,169
  - Density: 24.76/sq mi (9.558/km^{2})
- Time zone: UTC-6 (Central (CST))
  - Summer (DST): UTC-5 (CDT)
- Area code: 920
- FIPS code: 55-31350
- GNIS feature ID: 1583319
- Website: https://townofgreenlake.gov/

Green Lake is a town in Green Lake County, Wisconsin, United States. The population was 1,169 at the 2020 census. The town is located on the south side of Green Lake, with the city of Green Lake on the north side. The unincorporated communities of Forest Glen Beach, Greenwyck, Indian Hills, Sandstone Bluff, Spring Grove, Tuleta Hills, and Utley are located in the town.

== Geography ==
According to the United States Census Bureau, the town has a total area of 48.6 square miles (125.8 km^{2}), of which 47.2 square miles (122.3 km^{2}) is land and 1.3 square miles (3.5 km^{2}) (2.76%) is water.

== Demographics ==
As of the census of 2000, there were 1,258 people, 538 households, and 399 families residing in the town. The population density was 26.6 people per square mile (10.3/km^{2}). There were 1,010 housing units at an average density of 21.4 per square mile (8.3/km^{2}). The racial makeup of the town was 99.05% White, 0.08% Black or African American, 0.08% Native American, 0.08% Asian, and 0.72% from two or more races. 0.72% of the population were Hispanic or Latino of any race.

There were 538 households, out of which 19.5% had children under the age of 18 living with them, 66.9% were married couples living together, 4.6% had a female householder with no husband present, and 25.7% were non-families. 22.3% of all households were made up of individuals, and 12.6% had someone living alone who was 65 years of age or older. The average household size was 2.32 and the average family size was 2.71.

In the town, the population was spread out, with 17.2% under the age of 18, 5.5% from 18 to 24, 21.4% from 25 to 44, 31.9% from 45 to 64, and 24.1% who were 65 years of age or older. The median age was 48 years. For every 100 females, there were 101.3 males. For every 100 females age 18 and over, there were 100.4 males.

The median income for a household in the town was $42,574, and the median income for a family was $48,068. Males had a median income of $35,658 versus $24,464 for females. The per capita income for the town was $23,659. About 2.0% of families and 3.8% of the population were below the poverty line, including 4.4% of those under age 18 and 5.4% of those age 65 or over.

== Notable people ==
- Charles H. Smith, Wisconsin state legislator and farmer, was born in the town
