= Louis J. Fellenz Jr. =

20th century American politician

Member of the Wisconsin Senate from the 18th district
- In office January 1, 1945 – January 3, 1949
- Preceded by: himself
- Succeeded by: Alfred Van De Zande
- In office January 6, 1941 – June 16, 1944
- Preceded by: Morvin Duel
- Succeeded by: himself

Personal details
- Born: March 27, 1915 Fond du Lac, Wisconsin, U.S.
- Died: January 7, 1993 (aged 77) Tryon, North Carolina, U.S.
- Resting place: Rienzi Cemetery, Fond du Lac
- Party: Republican
- Spouse: Virginia Skinner (m. 1941–1993)
- Children: Louis J. Fellonz III; Lynn F. (Woods)
- Parent: Louis J. Fellenz (father)
- Education: University of Wisconsin (LL.B.)
- Profession: Lawyer, politician

Military service
- Allegiance: United States
- Branch/service: United States Army
- Years of service: 1944

Louis John Fellenz Jr. (March 27, 1915 – January 7, 1993) was an American lawyer, banker, and Republican politician from Fond du Lac, Wisconsin. He served two terms in the Wisconsin Senate, representing Wisconsin's 18th Senate district from 1941 to 1949. His father, L. J. Fellenz, previously represented the same state Senate district.

== Biography ==
Louis J. Fellenz Jr. was born on March 27, 1915, in Fond du Lac, Wisconsin.

Fellenz was a member of the Senate representing the 18th district from 1941 to 1948. He was a Republican. He attempted several times to join the armed forces during World War II, and after passing a physical for the United States Army in May 1944, he resigned from the state Senate and enlisted. He was elected to another term as state senator without opposition during his brief stint in the Army, and was discharged in December 1944.

He died on January 7, 1993, in Tryon, North Carolina.

== Personal life and family ==
Louis Fellenz Jr. was one of three children born to L. J. Fellenz and his wife Erma Emma (née Tabor). Louis Sr. was also a lawyer and state senator, and served as a Wisconsin circuit court judge for the last 10 years of his life.

On June 1, 1941, Louis Jr. married Virginia Skinner at her parents' summer home in Green Lake, Wisconsin. They had two children together and were married for nearly 52 years before his death in 1993.

Wisconsin Senate
Preceded by Morvin Duel	Member of the Wisconsin Senate from the 18th district January 6, 1941 – June 16, 1944	Succeeded by himself
Preceded by himself	Member of the Wisconsin Senate from the 18th district January 1, 1945 – January 3, 1949	Succeeded by Alfred Van De Zande
