= Alfred Van De Zande =

American politician

Alfred Van De Zande (October 8, 1893 in Campbellsport, Wisconsin – May 24, 1956 in Campbellsport, Wisconsin) was a member of the Wisconsin State Senate and the Wisconsin State Assembly. He later became a member of the faculty at the University of Wisconsin-Madison.

== Political career ==
Van De Zande was elected to the Senate representing the 18th district in 1948 and re-elected in 1952. Additionally, he served three terms in the Assembly. He had previously been Sheriff of Fond du Lac County, Wisconsin. Van De Zande was a Republican. He also served on the Campbellport village board and was village president. Van de Zande was also Wisconsin Insurance Commissioner. He resigned as insurance commissioner due to poor health, having served only three months. After Van De Zande's death, Paul J. Rogan was appointed to succeed him as insurance commissioner.
