= Fond du Lac (town), Wisconsin =

Town of Fond du Lac, Wisconsin
- Town
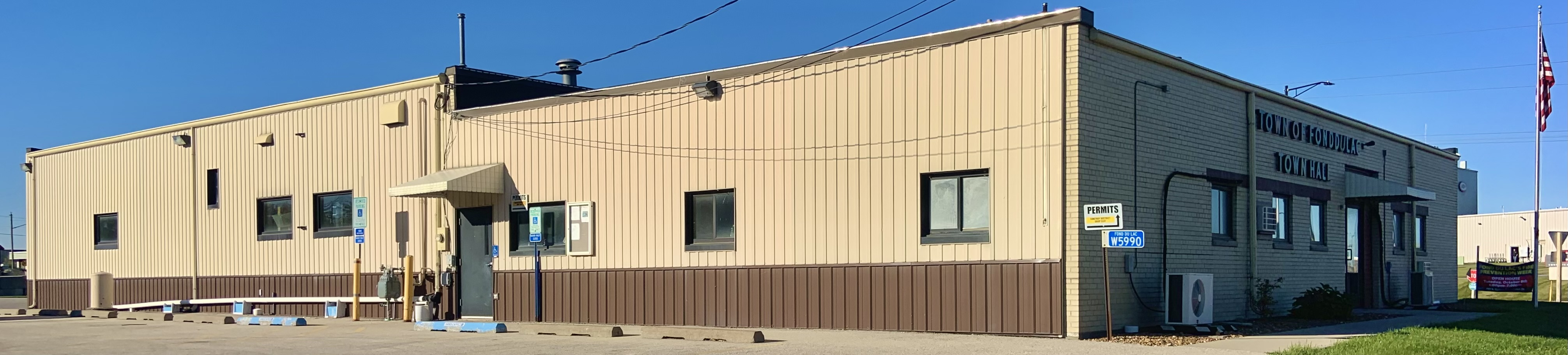
- Town hall

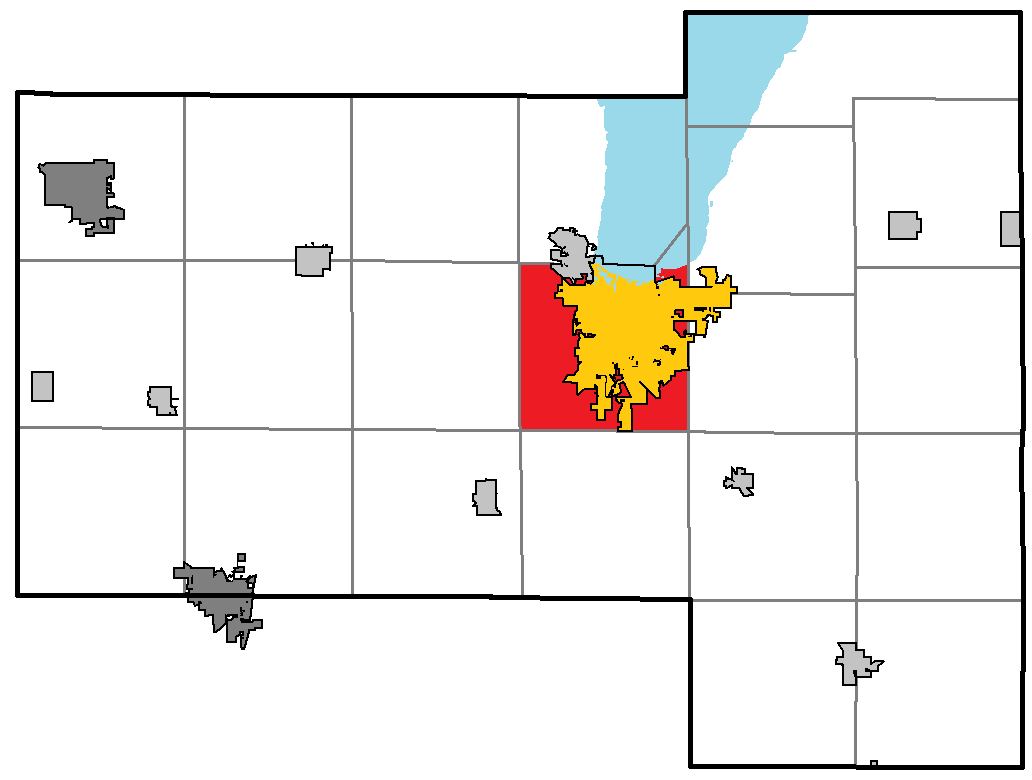
- Location of Fond du Lac, within Fond du Lac County

- Location within Wisconsin Location within the United States
- Coordinates: 43°45′24″N 88°26′40″W
- Country: United States
- State: Wisconsin
- County: Fond du Lac

Area
  - Total: 20.9 sq mi (54.2 km^{2})
  - Land: 19.8 sq mi (51.4 km^{2})
  - Water: 1.1 sq mi (2.8 km^{2})
- Elevation: 790 ft (240 m)

Population (2020)
  - Total: 3,687
  - Density: 186/sq mi (71.7/km^{2})
- Time zone: UTC-6 (Central (CST))
  - Summer (DST): UTC-5 (CDT)
- Area code: 920
- FIPS code: 55-26300
- GNIS feature ID: 1583209

Fond du Lac is a town in Fond du Lac County, Wisconsin, United States, first settled in 1836. The population was 3,687 at the 2020 census. The name is French for "bottom of the lake", from its location at the southern end of Lake Winnebago.

== Geography ==
According to the United States Census Bureau, the town has a total area of 20.9 square miles (54.2 km^{2}), of which 19.9 square miles (51.4 km^{2}) is land and 1.1 square miles (2.8 km^{2}) (5.16%) is water.

== Education ==
The town is near the Horicon Marsh State Wildlife Area and the Horicon National Wildlife Refuge.

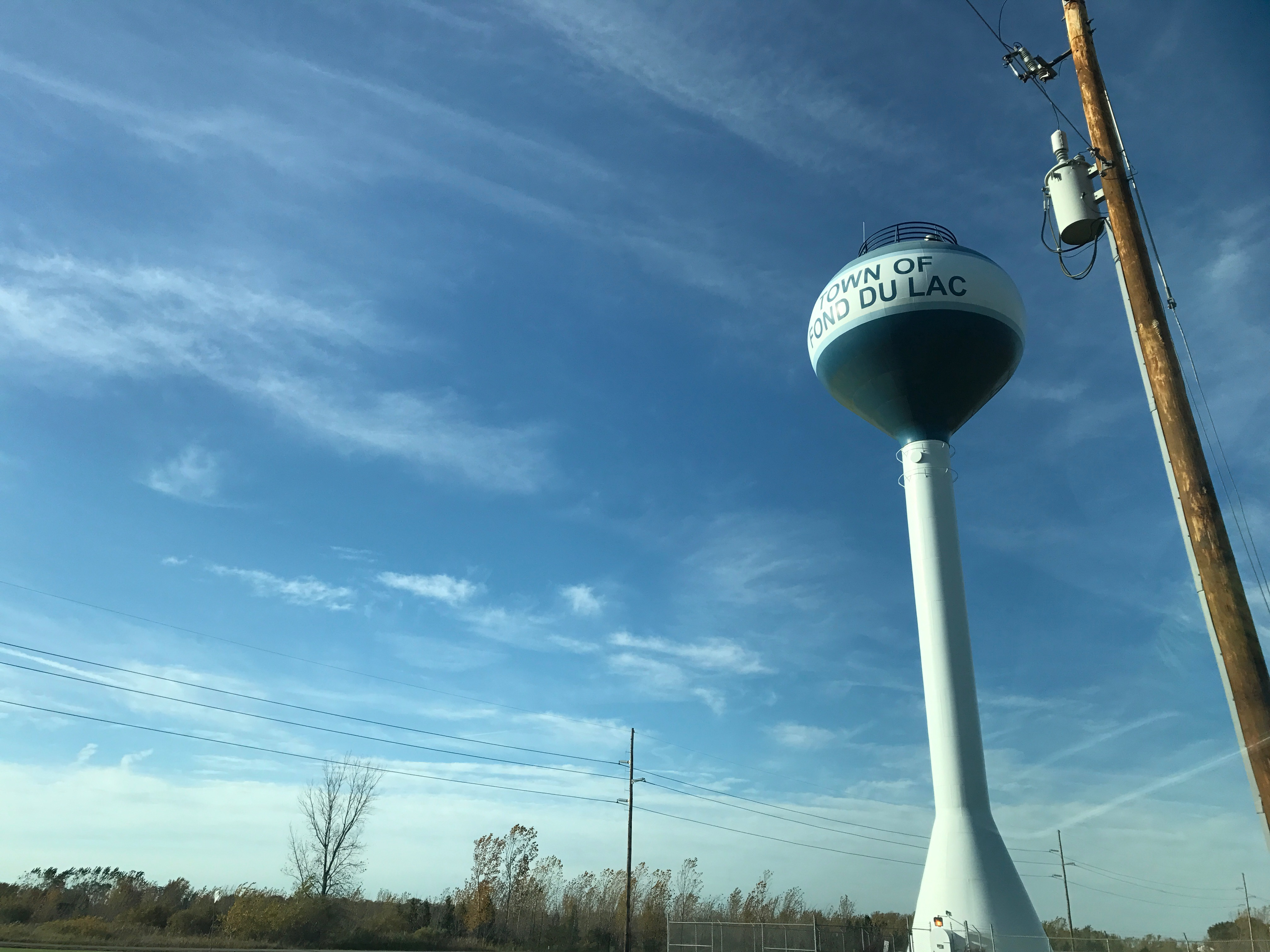
Town of Fond du Lac water tower
