= Eldorado, Wisconsin =

- Town
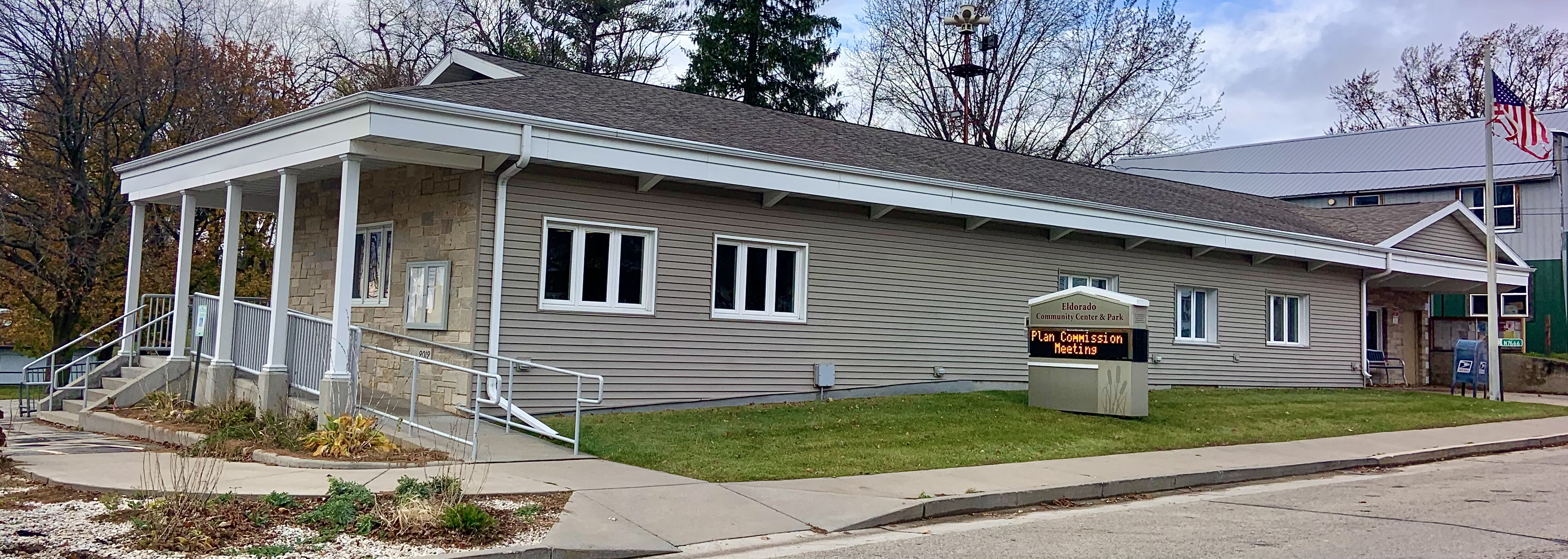
- Town hall

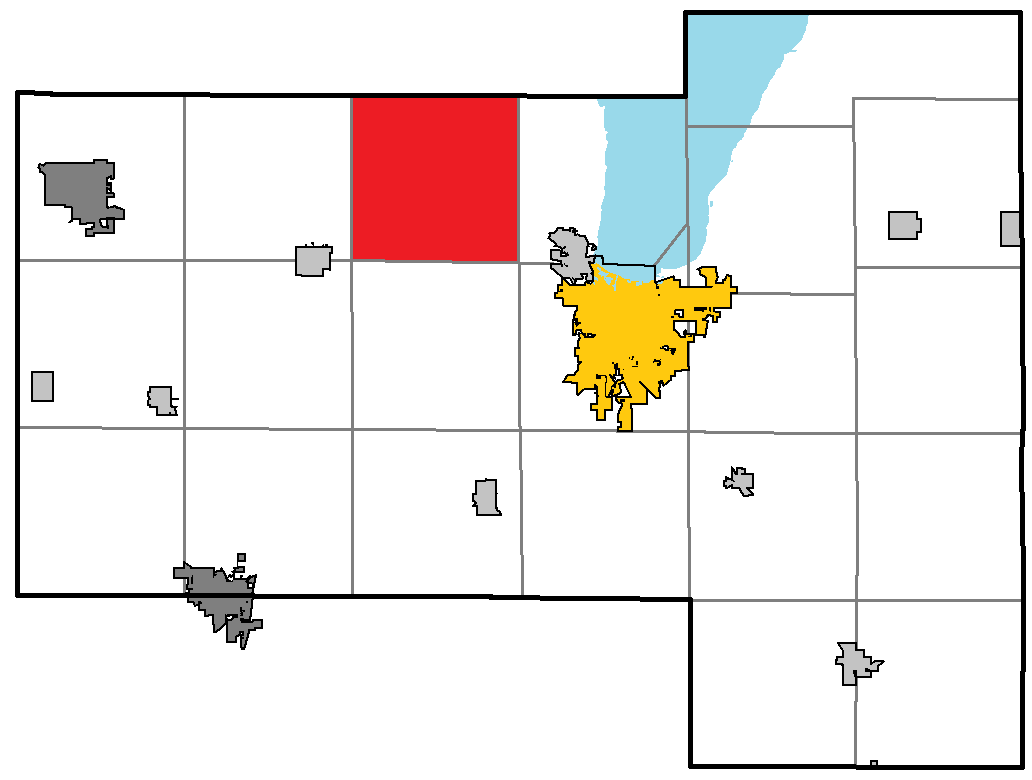
- Location of Eldorado, within Fond du Lac County
- Coordinates: 43°51′8″N 88°34′58″W
- Country: United States
- State: Wisconsin
- County: Fond du Lac

Area
  - Total: 36.3 sq mi (93.9 km^{2})
  - Land: 35.8 sq mi (92.6 km^{2})
  - Water: 0.46 sq mi (1.2 km^{2})
- Elevation: 869 ft (265 m)

Population (2020)
  - Total: 1,399
  - Density: 39.1/sq mi (15.1/km^{2})
- Time zone: UTC-6 (Central (CST))
  - Summer (DST): UTC-5 (CDT)
- Area code: 920
- FIPS code: 55-23150
- GNIS feature ID: 1583145
- Website: https://www.townofeldorado.com/

Eldorado is a town in Fond du Lac County, Wisconsin, United States. The population was 1,399 at the 2020 census. The unincorporated community of Eldorado is located in the town.

== Geography ==
According to the United States Census Bureau, the town has a total area of 36.2 square miles (93.9 km^{2}), of which 35.8 square miles (92.6 km^{2}) is land and 0.5 square mile (1.2 km^{2}) (1.30%) is water.

== Demographics ==
At the 2000 census there were 1,447 people, 490 households, and 420 families living in the town. The population density was 40.5 people per square mile (15.6/km^{2}). There were 506 housing units at an average density of 14.1 per square mile (5.5/km^{2}). The racial makeup of the town was 99.45% White, 0.35% Asian, 0.14% from other races, and 0.07% from two or more races. Hispanic or Latino of any race were 0.55%.

Of the 490 households 38.4% had children under the age of 18 living with them, 78.0% were married couples living together, 4.3% had a female householder with no husband present, and 14.1% were non-families. 12.2% of households were one person and 6.1% were one person aged 65 or older. The average household size was 2.95 and the average family size was 3.21.

The age distribution was 26.4% under the age of 18, 8.8% from 18 to 24, 27.2% from 25 to 44, 28.3% from 45 to 64, and 9.3% 65 or older. The median age was 37 years. For every 100 females, there were 103.8 males. For every 100 females age 18 and over, there were 104.8 males.

The median household income was $54,706 and the median family income was $57,000. Males had a median income of $37,841 versus $22,917 for females. The per capita income for the town was $22,239. About 1.7% of families and 2.7% of the population were below the poverty line, including 4.5% of those under age 18 and 6.0% of those age 65 or over.

== Religion ==
St. Peter's Evangelical Lutheran Church is a Christian church of the Wisconsin Evangelical Lutheran Synod in Eldorado.

== Notable people ==
- Morris S. Barnett, member of the Wisconsin State Assembly in 1851 and 1857
- Morvin Duel, member of the Wisconsin State Senate from 1937 to 1939
- Myrton H. Duel, member of the Wisconsin State Assembly in 1948
- James K. Scribner, member of the Wisconsin State Assembly in 1876
