= North Fond du Lac, Wisconsin =

- Village
- Location of North Fond du Lac in Fond du Lac County, Wisconsin.
- Coordinates: 43°48′37″N 88°28′56″W
- Country: United States
- State: Wisconsin
- County: Fond du Lac

Area
  - Total: 2.15 sq mi (5.56 km^{2})
  - Land: 2.12 sq mi (5.50 km^{2})
  - Water: 0.023 sq mi (0.06 km^{2})
- Elevation: 768 ft (234 m)

Population (2020)
  - Total: 5,378
  - Density: 2,504.9/sq mi (967.14/km^{2})
- Time zone: UTC-6 (Central (CST))
  - Summer (DST): UTC-5 (CDT)
- Area code: 920
- FIPS code: 55-58000
- GNIS feature ID: 1570425
- Website: www.nfdl.org

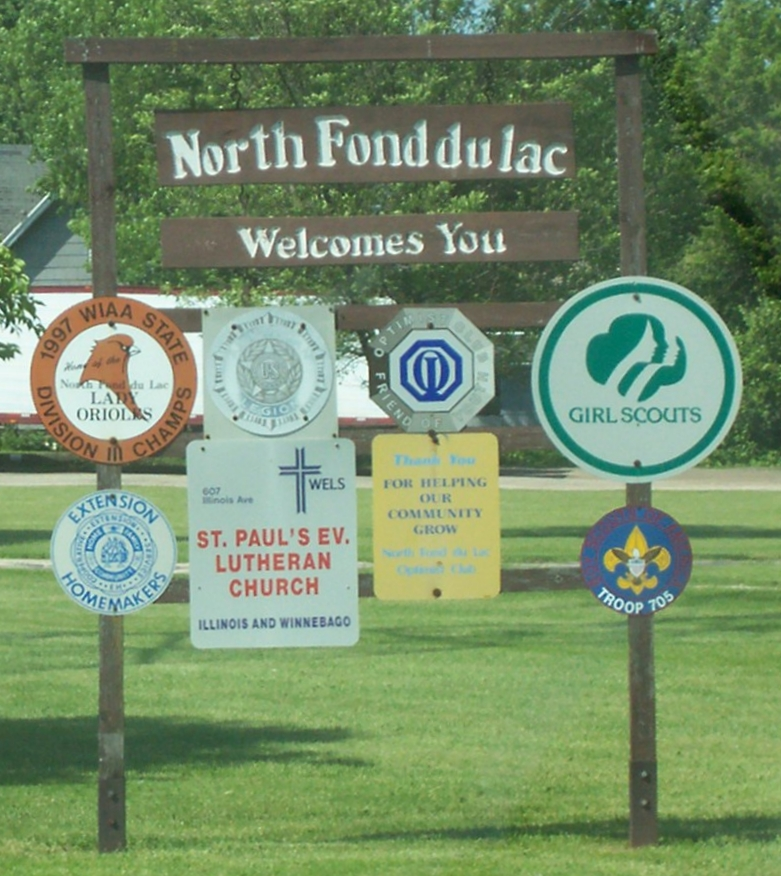
Welcome sign

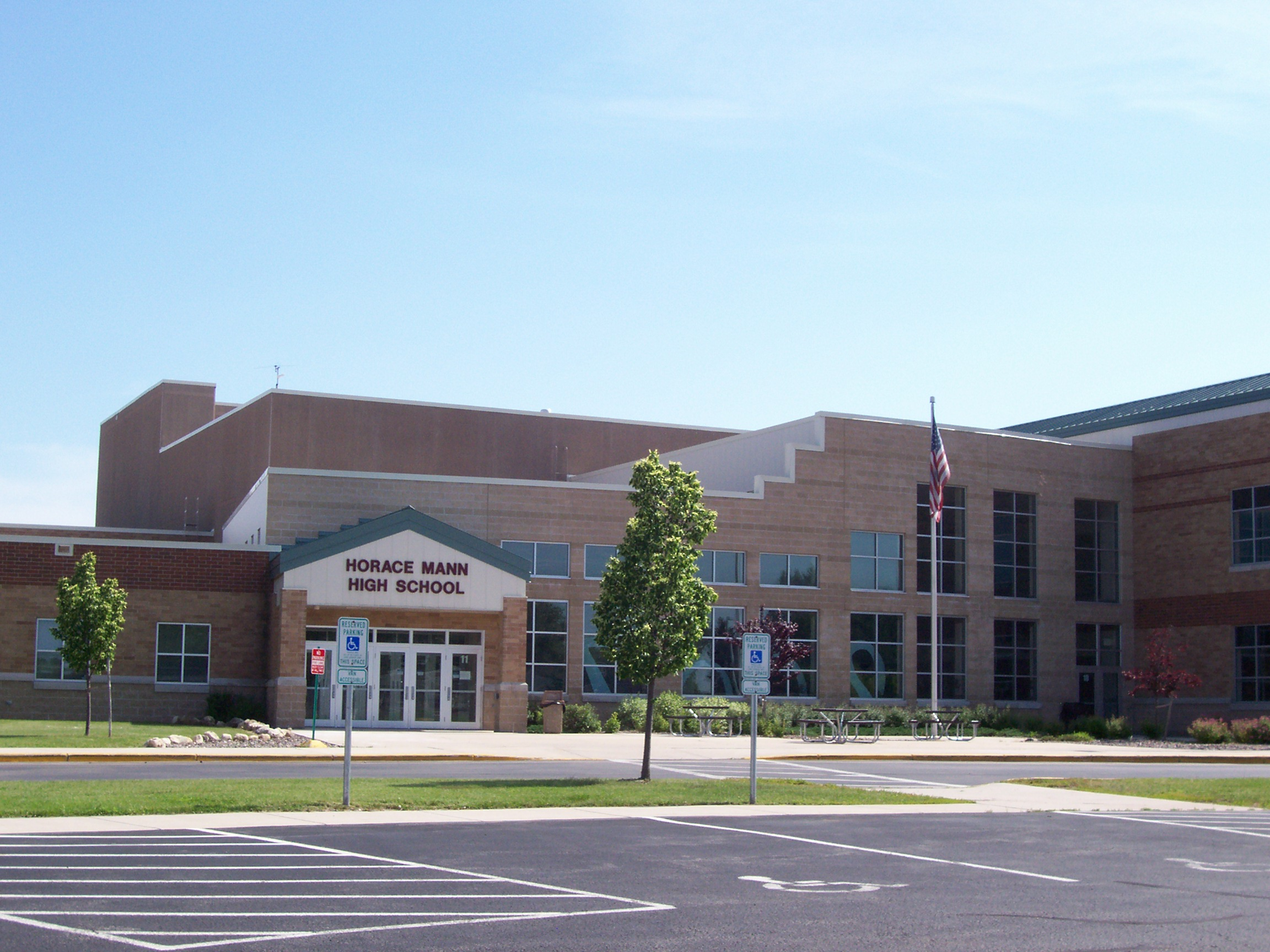
Horace Mann High School

North Fond du Lac is a village in Fond du Lac County, Wisconsin, United States. The population was 5,378 at the 2020 census. Despite the name, North Fond du Lac is actually located northwest of Fond du Lac, as Lake Winnebago is directly north of Fond du Lac.

== Geography ==
North Fond du Lac is located at 43°48′37″N 88°28′56″W (43.810188, -88.482232).

According to the United States Census Bureau, the village has a total area of 2.14 square miles (5.54 km^{2}), of which 2.12 square miles (5.49 km^{2}) is land and 0.02 square miles (0.05 km^{2}) is water.

== Demographics ==
Historical population
Census	Pop.	Note	%±
1910	1,960		—
1920	2,150		9.7%
1930	2,244		4.4%
1940	2,083		−7.2%
1950	2,291		10.0%
1960	2,549		11.3%
1970	3,286		28.9%
1980	3,844		17.0%
1990	4,292		11.7%
2000	4,557		6.2%
2010	5,014		10.0%
2020	5,378		7.3%

=== 2020 census ===
As of the census of 2020, there were 5,378 people, and 1,985 households in the village. The population density was 2,536.8 inhabitants per square mile (979.5/km^{2}). There were 2,305 housing units at an average density of 1,087.3 per square mile (419.8/km^{2}). The racial makeup of the village was 81.3% White, 1.6% Black or African American, 0.7% Native American, 1.6% Asian, 6.7% from other races, and 8.1% from two or more races. Hispanic or Latino of any race were 13.5% of the population.

=== 2010 census ===
As of the census of 2010, there were 5,014 people, 2,106 households, and 1,372 families living in the village. The population density was 2,365.1 inhabitants per square mile (913.2/km^{2}). There were 2,199 housing units at an average density of 1,037.3 per square mile (400.5/km^{2}). The racial makeup of the village was 94.6% White, 0.7% African American, 0.4% Native American, 1.5% Asian, 1.8% from other races, and 1.0% from two or more races. Hispanic or Latino of any race were 4.3% of the population.

There were 2,106 households, of which 30.9% had children under the age of 18 living with them, 49.8% were married couples living together, 10.6% had a female householder with no husband present, 4.7% had a male householder with no wife present, and 34.9% were non-families. 27.6% of all households were made up of individuals, and 12% had someone living alone who was 65 years of age or older. The average household size was 2.37 and the average family size was 2.88.

The median age in the village was 39 years. 23.3% of residents were under the age of 18; 8.1% were between the ages of 18 and 24; 26.8% were from 25 to 44; 28.3% were from 45 to 64; and 13.5% were 65 years of age or older. The gender makeup of the village was 49.0% male and 51.0% female.

=== 2000 census ===
As of the census of 2000, there were 4,557 people, 1,789 households, and 1,289 families living in the village. The population density was 2,387.6 people per square mile (921.2/km^{2}). There were 1,912 housing units at an average density of 1,001.8 per square mile (386.5/km^{2}). The racial makeup of the village was 97.94% White, 0.22% African American, 0.22% Native American, 0.37% Asian, 0.02% Pacific Islander, 0.29% from other races, and 0.94% from two or more races. Hispanic or Latino of any race were 1.14% of the population.

There were 1,789 households, out of which 35.6% had children under the age of 18 living with them, 57.9% were married couples living together, 9.7% had a female householder with no husband present, and 27.9% were non-families. 23.0% of all households were made up of individuals, and 9.2% had someone living alone who was 65 years of age or older. The average household size was 2.53 and the average family size was 2.97.

In the village, the population was spread out, with 26.3% under the age of 18, 8.3% from 18 to 24, 31.0% from 25 to 44, 22.6% from 45 to 64, and 11.8% who were 65 years of age or older. The median age was 35 years. For every 100 females, there were 94.5 males. For every 100 females age 18 and over, there were 91.5 males.

The median income for a household in the village was $44,327, and the median income for a family was $49,946. Males had a median income of $37,959 versus $21,631 for females. The per capita income for the village was $17,492. About 3.5% of families and 6.9% of the population were below the poverty line, including 9.1% of those under age 18 and 9.8% of those age 65 or over.

== Religion ==
St. Paul's Evangelical Lutheran Church is a member of the Wisconsin Evangelical Lutheran Synod (WELS) in North Fond du Lac.

Church of the Presentation of the Blessed Virgin Catholic Church is part of the Archdiocese of Milwaukee.

== Education ==
The School District of North Fond du Lac includes Friendship Learning Center (Grades K–5), Bessie Allen Middle School (Grades 6–8), and Horace Mann High School (Grades 9-12). The district includes the Treffert Way for the Exceptional Mind charter school, as well as the Alternative Learning Center for high school students with special needs. The school district serves more than 1,200 students across all grade levels. The superintendent of the school district is Aaron Sadoff.

St. Paul's Lutheran School is a preschool and 4K-8th grade school of the Wisconsin Evangelical Lutheran Synod in North Fond du Lac.

== Notable residents ==
- Mike Winkelmann, Artist known as Beeple, grew up in North Fond du Lac and went to St. Mary Springs High School.
- Albert J. Pullen, Wisconsin State Senator, was President of North Fond du Lac.
- Jason Witczak, American football player, was born in and went to high school in North Fond du Lac.
