= Springvale, Fond du Lac County, Wisconsin =

Springvale, Wisconsin
- Town
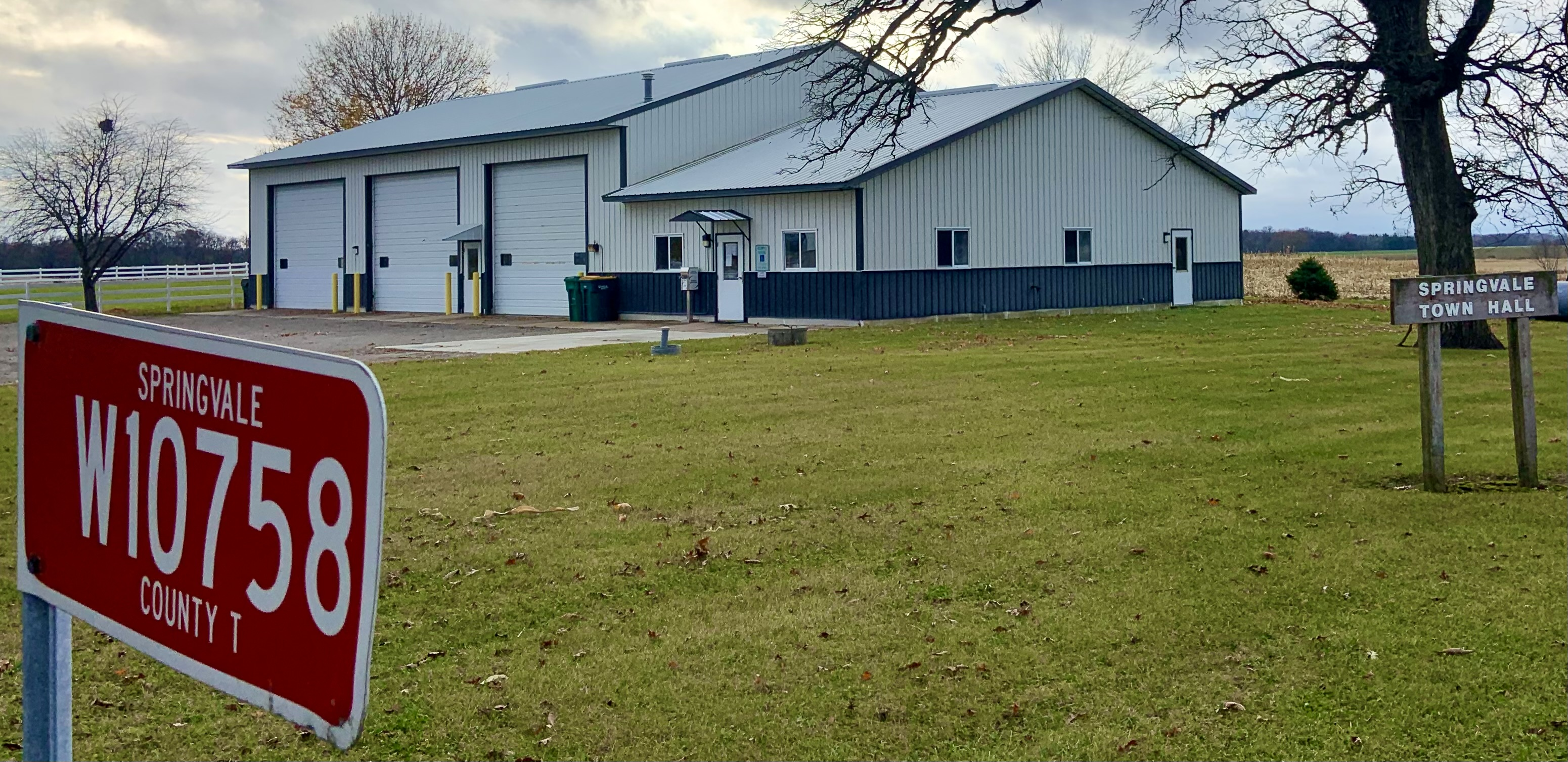
- Town hall

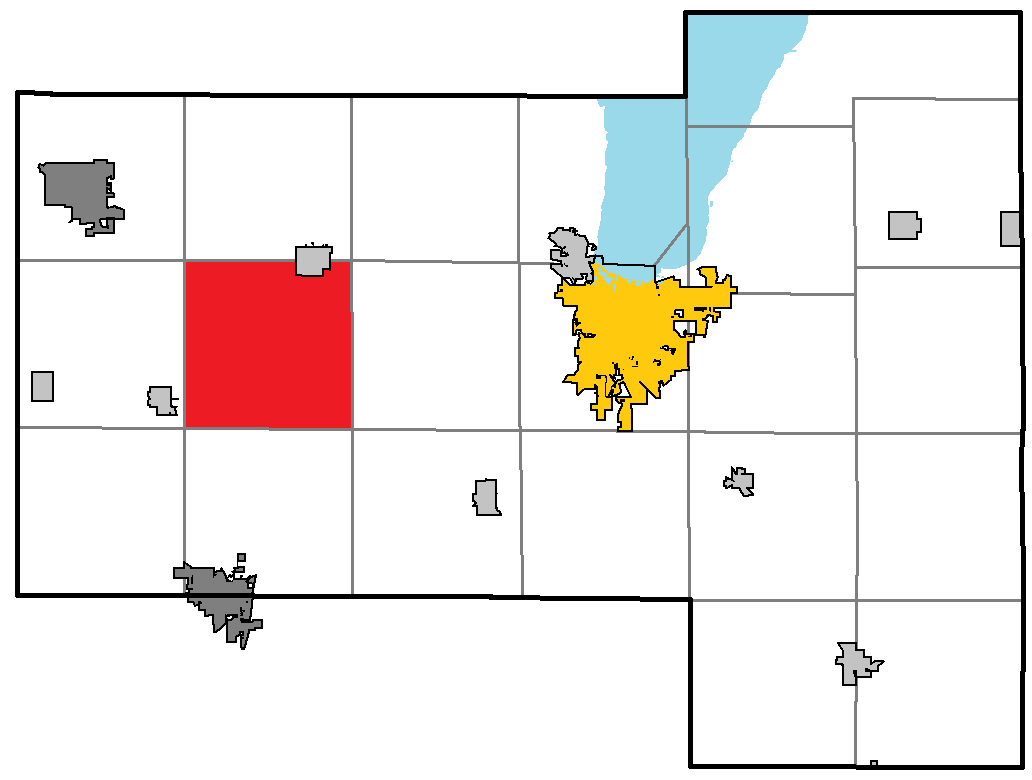
- Location of Springvale, within Fond du Lac County
- Coordinates: 43°45′50″N 88°42′19″W
- Country: United States
- State: Wisconsin
- County: Fond du Lac

Area
  - Total: 36.0 sq mi (93.2 km^{2})
  - Land: 36.0 sq mi (93.2 km^{2})
  - Water: 0 sq mi (0.0 km^{2})
- Elevation: 955 ft (291 m)

Population (2020)
  - Total: 675
  - Density: 18.8/sq mi (7.24/km^{2})
- Time zone: UTC-6 (Central (CST))
  - Summer (DST): UTC-5 (CDT)
- Area code: 920
- FIPS code: 55-76250
- GNIS feature ID: 1584202
- Website: https://www.townspringvale.com/

Springvale is a town in Fond du Lac County, Wisconsin, United States. The population was 975 at the 2020 census. The unincorporated community of Ladoga is located partially in the town.

== Geography ==
According to the United States Census Bureau, the town has a total area of 36.0 square miles (93.2 km^{2}), all land.

== Demographics ==
At the 2000 census there were 727 people, 270 households, and 206 families living in the town. The population density was 20.2 people per square mile (7.8/km^{2}). There were 277 housing units at an average density of 7.7 per square mile (3.0/km^{2}). The racial makeup of the town was 99.59% White, 0.14% Native American, 0.14% Asian, and 0.14% from two or more races. Hispanic or Latino of any race were 0.55%.

Of the 270 households 32.6% had children under the age of 18 living with them, 67.0% were married couples living together, 3.7% had a female householder with no husband present, and 23.7% were non-families. 20.4% of households were one person and 7.4% were one person aged 65 or older. The average household size was 2.69 and the average family size was 3.15.

The age distribution was 27.5% under the age of 18, 6.6% from 18 to 24, 28.6% from 25 to 44, 24.5% from 45 to 64, and 12.8% 65 or older. The median age was 38 years. For every 100 females, there were 109.5 males. For every 100 females age 18 and over, there were 108.3 males.

The median household income was $47,604 and the median family income was $51,591. Males had a median income of $38,654 versus $21,979 for females. The per capita income for the town was $19,369. About 4.9% of families and 4.5% of the population were below the poverty line, including 4.7% of those under age 18 and 2.2% of those age 65 or over.
