= Charles H. Smith (Wisconsin politician) =

American politician

Charles H. Smith (June 1, 1863 – November 4, 1915) was an American farmer and politician.

Born in the town of Green Lake, Green Lake County, Wisconsin, Smith went to Berlin High School in Berlin, Wisconsin and the Oshkosh Commercial College. Smith was a farmer. He served on the Green Lake Town Board and as the Green Lake Town Treasurer. Smith also served on the Markesan, Wisconsin Village Board. He served on the Markesan School Board and was the board clerk. In 1903. Smith served in the Wisconsin State Assembly and was a Democrat. From 1905 to 1909, Smith served in the Wisconsin State Senate. Smith died of cancer at the hospital in Fond du Lac, Wisconsin. He was buried in Markesan.
