= Morley Garfield Kelly =

20th century American politician

Morley Garfield Kelly (May 4, 1892 – October 10, 1956) was an American businessman and Democratic politician from Fond du Lac, Wisconsin. His first name was sometimes incorrectly spelled "Marley".

Born in Watertown, South Dakota, Kelly graduated from Wadena High School in Wadena, Minnesota and served in the North Dakota Army National Guard. He worked in the newspaper business, as a linotype operator, and moved to Fond du Lac, Wisconsin in 1922. He was also in the lumber business. Kelly served in the Wisconsin State Senate from 1933 to 1937. In 1948, he was a candidate for the Wisconsin State Assembly, losing to Myrton H. Duel. He was a Democrat. He died in October 1956.
