= Lewis G. Kellogg =

American politician

Lewis George Kellogg (May 17, 1856 – May 26, 1943) was a member of the Wisconsin State Senate.

== Biography ==
Kellogg was born on May 17, 1856, in Fond du Lac County, Wisconsin. He attended Ripon College.

== Career ==
Kellogg was a member of the Senate from 1913 to 1915. In addition, he was an alderman, school commissioner, and mayor of Ripon, Wisconsin. He was a Democrat.
