= Pier (surname) =

Pier is a surname, and may refer to:

- Caroline Hamilton Pier (1870–1938), American lawyer
- Edward Pier (1807–1877), American businessman and politician from Wisconsin
- Ford Pier (born 1970), Canadian singer-songwriter
- Harriet Hamilton Pier (1872–1943), American lawyer
- Jean-Paul Pier (1933–2016), Luxembourgish mathematician
- Kate Pier (1845–1925), American court commissioner, mother of Caroline, Harriet and Kate Hamilton Pier
- Kate Hamilton Pier (1868–1931), American lawyer
- Róber Pier (born 1995), Spanish footballer

== See also ==
- St Pier (surname)
- Pieri (surname)
