= Klapperich =

Klapperich is a surname. Notable people with the surname include:

- Ann Klapperich (born 1976), American basketball player
- Catherine M. Klapperich, American biomedical engineer
