= Pieri =

Pieri may refer to:

- A member of the Pieres, an ancient Thracian tribe
- Pieri (surname)

== See also ==
- Pieri's formula
- Pieria (regional unit), a Greek administrative unit
- Seleucia Pieria, an ancient Roman city in modern-day Turkey; and
  - Pieria (Syria) its Roman prefecture
