= Kate Everest Levi =

American educator, writer, and social worker (1859–1938)

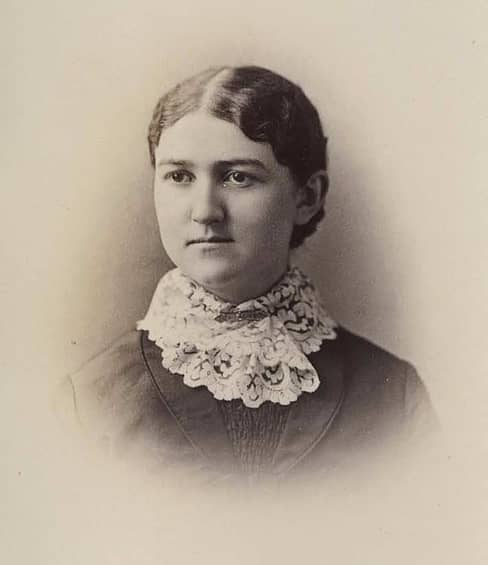
Kate Everest Levi

Kate Asaphine Everest Levi (January 4, 1859 – October 19, 1938) was an American educator, writer, and social worker. Over the course of her career, she became the first director of Kingsley House in Pittsburgh, Pennsylvania, a settlement house, and the first woman Ph.D. recipient from the University of Wisconsin. Although both Syracuse University (1880, 1884) and the College of Wooster (1889) had granted doctorates in history to women in the 1880s, Everest Levi is considered the first woman to receive a Ph.D. in history from an organized graduate school in the United States. She wrote on topics such as education and German immigration to the Midwest.

== History ==
Kate Everest was born in Fond du Lac, Wisconsin, to parents Asaph and Mary (Abercrombie) Everest. After attending Fond du Lac High School, she entered the University of Wisconsin in 1879, earning a BA in 1882. After graduation, she taught at Markham's Academy, Milwaukee, from 1882 to 1883; at La Crosse High School from 1883 to 1884; and was a teacher of history and languages at Lawrence University from 1884 to 1890. She then earned an MA in 1892 and a PhD in 1893 from the University of Wisconsin.

She worked with Jane Addams at Hull House in Chicago before moving to Pittsburgh, where she was appointed head of Kingsley House social settlement from 1896. She published several articles and books on history and education. Her papers are held at the Wisconsin Historical Society.

She married Ernest Reese Levi on April 21, 1896, and had two children.

She died October 19, 1938, in Madison, Wisconsin, at the age of 79.

== Selected works ==
- "Early Lutheran Immigration to Wisconsin" in Transactions of the Wisconsin Academy of Sciences, Arts and Letters, Vol. 8. Madison, Democrat Printing Company, 1892, pp. 289–298.
- "How Wisconsin Came by Its Large German Element" in Wisconsin Historical Collections, Vol. 12. Madison: State Historical Society of Wisconsin, 1892, pp. 299–334.
- "Geographical Origin of German Immigration to Wisconsin" in Collections of the State Historical Society of Wisconsin, Vol. 14. Madison, Democrat Printing Company, 1898, pp. 341–393.
- "The Wisconsin Press and Slavery". Wisconsin Magazine of History, vol. 9, no. 4 (July 1926): 423-434.
- "The Press and the Constitution". Wisconsin Magazine of History, vol. 16, no. 4 (June 1933): 383-403.
