= Harriet Hamilton Pier =

American lawyer (1872–1943)

Harriet Hamilton Pier Simonds
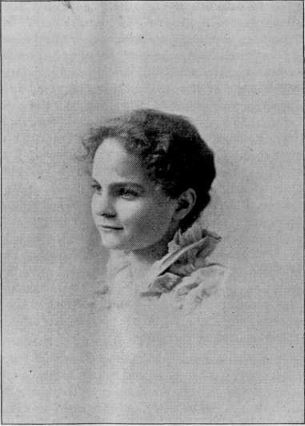
- Harriet Hamilton Pier, 1893
- Born: April 26, 1872; Fond du Lac, Wisconsin
- Died: April 12, 1943 (aged 70); Rhinelander, Wisconsin
- Occupation: Lawyer
- Spouse: Charles Gilchrist Simonds (m. 1905)

Harriet Hamilton Pier Simonds (April 26, 1872 – April 12, 1943) was a lawyer in Wisconsin. Her mother and two sisters were also lawyers, at a time when there were only eight female lawyers in Wisconsin.

== Biography ==
Harriet Hamilton Pier was born on April 26, 1872, in Fond du Lac, Wisconsin. She was the third daughter of Kate Pier and Colwert Kendall Pier.

She was educated in the public schools of Fond du Lac, Madison and Milwaukee, and graduated from the Milwaukee High School in 1889. With the inheritance from her father, Kate Pier went to law school and became a lawyer. Her three daughters, Kate Hamilton Pier, Caroline Hamilton Pier and Harriet Hamilton Pier, would also attend law school.

Mother and daughters constituted a law firm practicing first in Fond du Lac and then, in 1888, in Milwaukee, Wisconsin. The firm was instrumental in the passage of two laws in the Wisconsin Legislature, one enabling women to act as assignees, and another enabling women, who were attorneys-at-law, to be court commissioners. The firm did not take criminal business, but outside of that their practice is a general practice, running mostly to corporation, real estate and probate law.

Pier entered the law department of the Wisconsin University, and, at the end of two years, she took her degree of LL.B. In 1891 Caroline and Harriet were admitted to the bar, alongside their mother and sister were four of the eight female lawyers in Wisconsin.

Pier studied the Polish language, all sisters having practical knowledge of the German. Harriet Hamilton Pier specialized in real estate law. She had much experience in and about the pine forests of northern Wisconsin and had actual personal charge and management of large tracts of timber land. She argued her first case before the Wisconsin Supreme Court in 1896.

She married Charles Gilchrist Simonds (1873-1943), an electrical engineer with the General Electric Company of Schnectady, in 1905. The couple moved to Rhinelander, Wisconsin and had two children, Kate Simonds and Hamilton Simonds. She was treasurer of the Milwaukee chapter of the Daughters of the American Revolution and joined the Portia Club, the National Association of Women Lawyers, and the Rhinelander Women's Club.

She died in Rhinelander on April 12, 1943.
