= Caroline Hamilton Pier =

American lawyer (1870–1938)

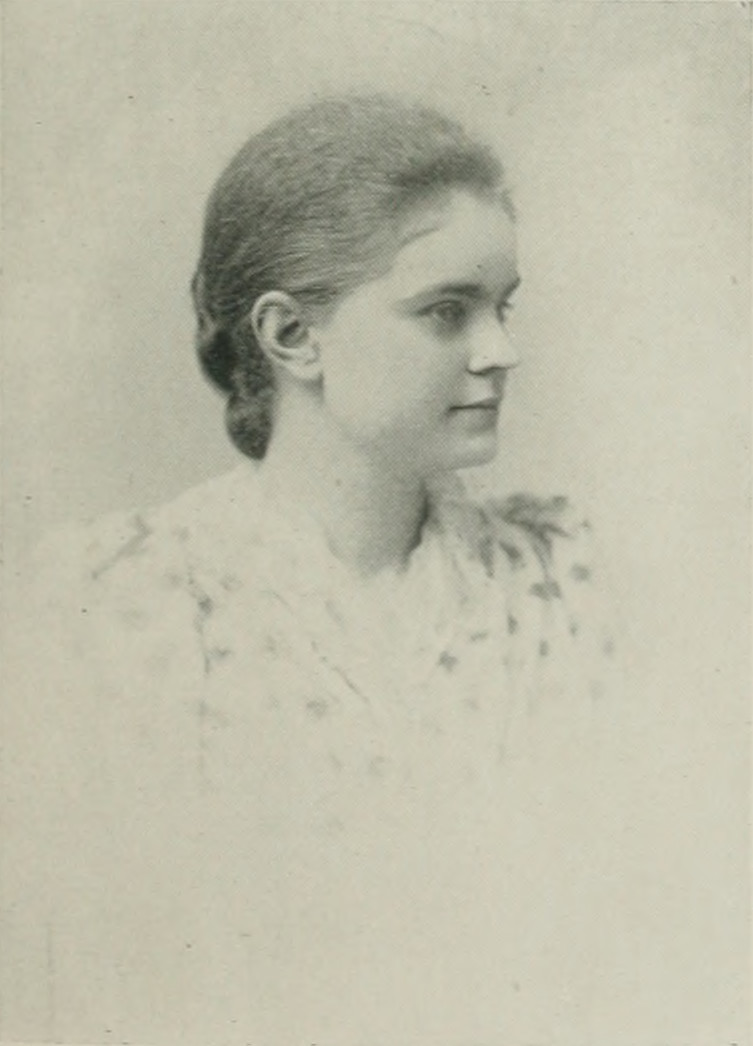
- Born: September 18, 1870; Fond du Lac, Wisconsin
- Died: April 28, 1938 (aged 67); Madison, Wisconsin
- Education: Wisconsin University
- Occupation: Lawyer
- Spouse: John Henry Roehmer (m. 1897; died 1935)

Caroline Hamilton Pier Roehmer (September 18, 1870 – April 28, 1938) was an American lawyer.

== Early life ==
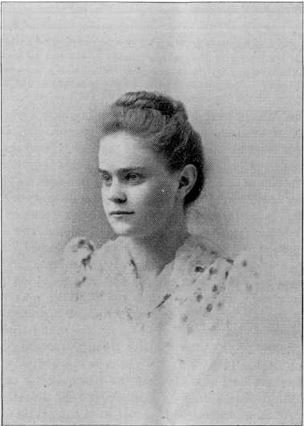
Caroline Hamilton Pier

Caroline Hamilton Pier was born in Fond du Lac, Wisconsin, on September 18, 1870. She was the second daughter of Colwert Kendall Pier and Kate Pier.

She was educated in the public schools of Fond du Lac and was graduated in the classical course of the high school, after studying music and other womanly subjects, until ready to enter the law school of the Wisconsin University. She enrolled in 1889, finishing the course in 1891 and receiving the degree of LL.B.

After law school, she briefly studied elocution at Northwestern University.

== Career ==
She was admitted to the Wisconsin Bar in 1891 and joined the firm in Milwaukee, Wisconsin, of which her mother, Kate Pier, and two sisters, Kate Hamilton Pier and Harriet Hamilton Pier, were the other members.

She paid special attention to admiralty and maritime law and made it a specialty. In 1897, she was admitted to the bar of the United States Supreme Court.

== Personal life ==
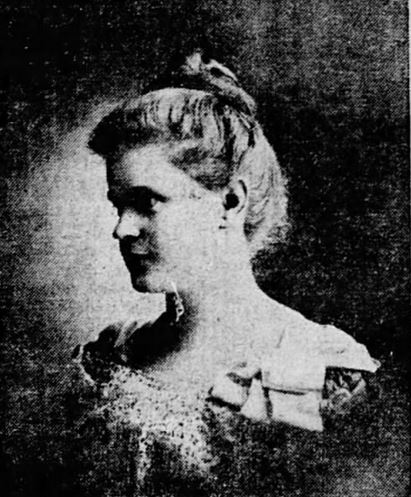
Caroline Hamilton Pier

On November 17, 1897, Caroline Hamilton Pier married John Henry Roehmer (1865-1935), a lawyer and Yale graduate. The wedding was celebrated by her mother, Kate Pier, in her capacity of Court Commissioner. She had four children: Kate Pier Roehmer French (1898-1984), John Pier Roehmer (1901-1971), Dr. Edward Pier Roehmer (1908-1999) and James McIntosh Roehmer (1907-1908). John H. Roehmer taught at the University of Wisconsin and at Yale University and was instrumental in organizing the Wisconsin's street railway commission. He served on the State's Railroad Rate Commission and was general counsel for H.M. Byllesby & Co.

She and her husband lived in Milwaukee and Fond du Lac, but moved to Elmhurst, New York, after he retired in 1931. She died on April 28, 1938, in Madison, Wisconsin.
