= Kate Hamilton Pier =

American lawyer (1868–1931)

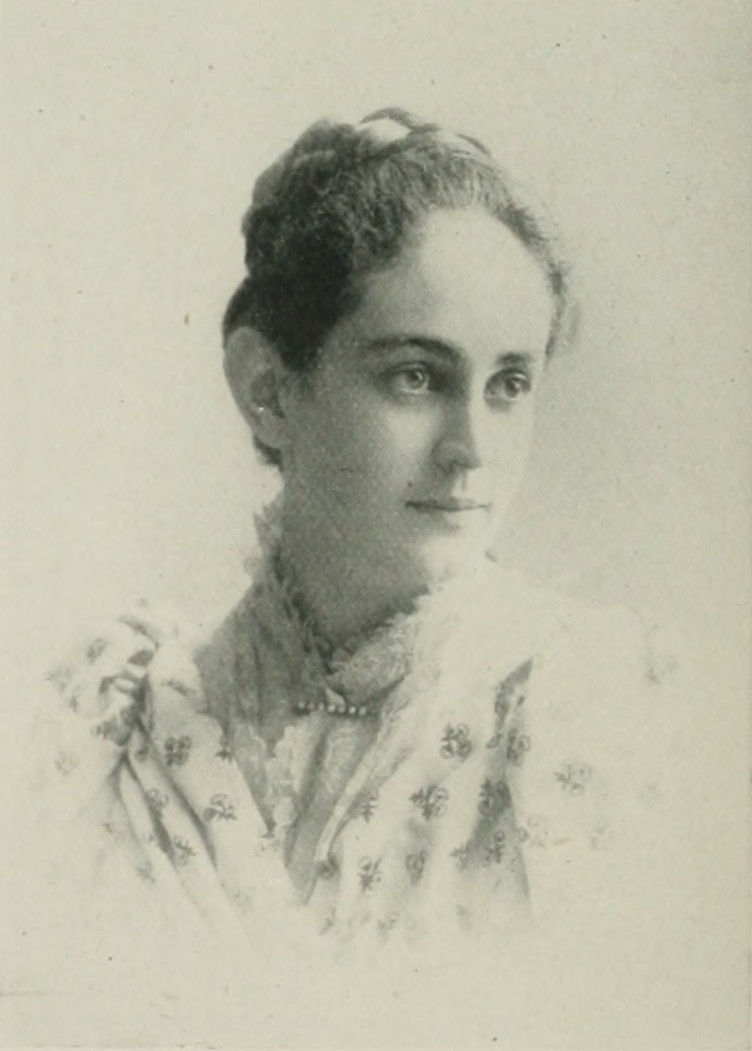
- Born: December 11, 1868; Fond du Lac, Wisconsin, US
- Died: April 1, 1931 (aged 62); Fond du Lac, Wisconsin, US
- Education: Wisconsin State University
- Occupation: Lawyer
- Spouse: James Alexander McIntosh (m. 1901; died 1916)

Kate Hamilton Pier McIntosh (December 11, 1868 – April 1, 1931) was a lawyer. She was the first woman to argue a case before the Wisconsin Supreme Court.

== Early life ==
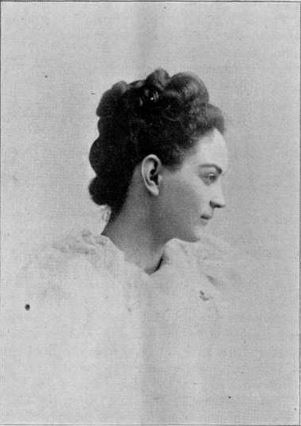
Kate Hamilton Pier

Kate Hamilton Pier was born on December 11, 1868, in Fond du Lac, Wisconsin, the daughter of Colwert Kendall Pier, a lawyer, and Kate Hamilton, both from Vermont. Pier Elementary School in Fond du Lac is named after Colwert and Kate Pier. Colwert was also the first white child born in Fond du Lac County, in 1841, and Kate, the oldest of his four daughters, was born on the same farm.

Her mother and both her sisters—Caroline and Harriet—all graduated from law school and were among the first eight women lawyers in Wisconsin. Her mother was a pioneer in many areas: in 1893, she was appointed as Milwaukee court commissioner as the first woman in the United States to be granted a judicial appointment and she was the first woman to vote in the county, even before the suffrage amendment was passed.

During childhood, Pier lived on the homestead farm just outside the limits of the city of Fond du Lac. She attended the German and English Academy, where she learned German, which enabled her to practice law in Milwaukee, Wisconsin. Later she attended the public schools and was graduated from the Fond du Lac High School in 1886, 25 years after her mother had graduated from the same institution.

A university course was then much desired, but her mother's anxiety to be with her and to have her begin business life under her personal supervision led to their both entering the law department of the Wisconsin State University in September 1886. Both completed the two-year course in one year by taking the work of the junior and senior classes simultaneously. Pier received the LL.B. degree on June 22, 1887. She was elected vice-president of the senior class.

== Career ==
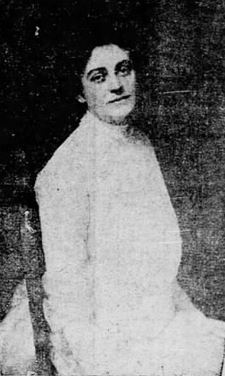
Kate Hamilton Pier, 1902

After receiving her degree, Pier returned to Fond du Lac for one year, where she practiced law, but also spent time in perfecting her knowledge of German and stenography. In 1888 she moved with her parents to Milwaukee and went into the law department of the Wisconsin Central Railroad for a year.

She then moved into general practice with her family and steadily gained reputation for her intellect and legal knowledge. She won her first victory in the Wisconsin Supreme Court in September 1889. In 1894, she became the first woman to argue at the Federal Circuit Court of Appeals in Chicago. Pier practiced in all the courts in Milwaukee, except the municipal, which was solely a police court. She was also admitted to practice in the United States Supreme Court.

She also did some legislative work, spending weeks looking after bills in the interest of women.

== Personal life ==
On November 26, 1901, Pier married James Alexander McIntosh. After she married, she quit her law practice and moved to New York City. When her husband died, she moved back to Fond du Lac. She was elected president of the Portia Club in Milwaukee in 1928 and served on the Wisconsin Bar Committee on Women Lawyers in 1929.

She died on April 1, 1931, in Fond du Lac.
