= St Pier (surname) =

St Pier or St-Pier is a surname, and may refer to:

- Gavin St Pier (born 1967), politician from Guernsey
- Natasha St-Pier (born 1981), Canadian singer, songwriter and television presenter
- Wally St Pier (1904–1989), English footballer and scout

== See also ==
- Pier (surname)
- Saint Pier (disambiguation)
