= Justus DaLee =

American artist (1793–1878)

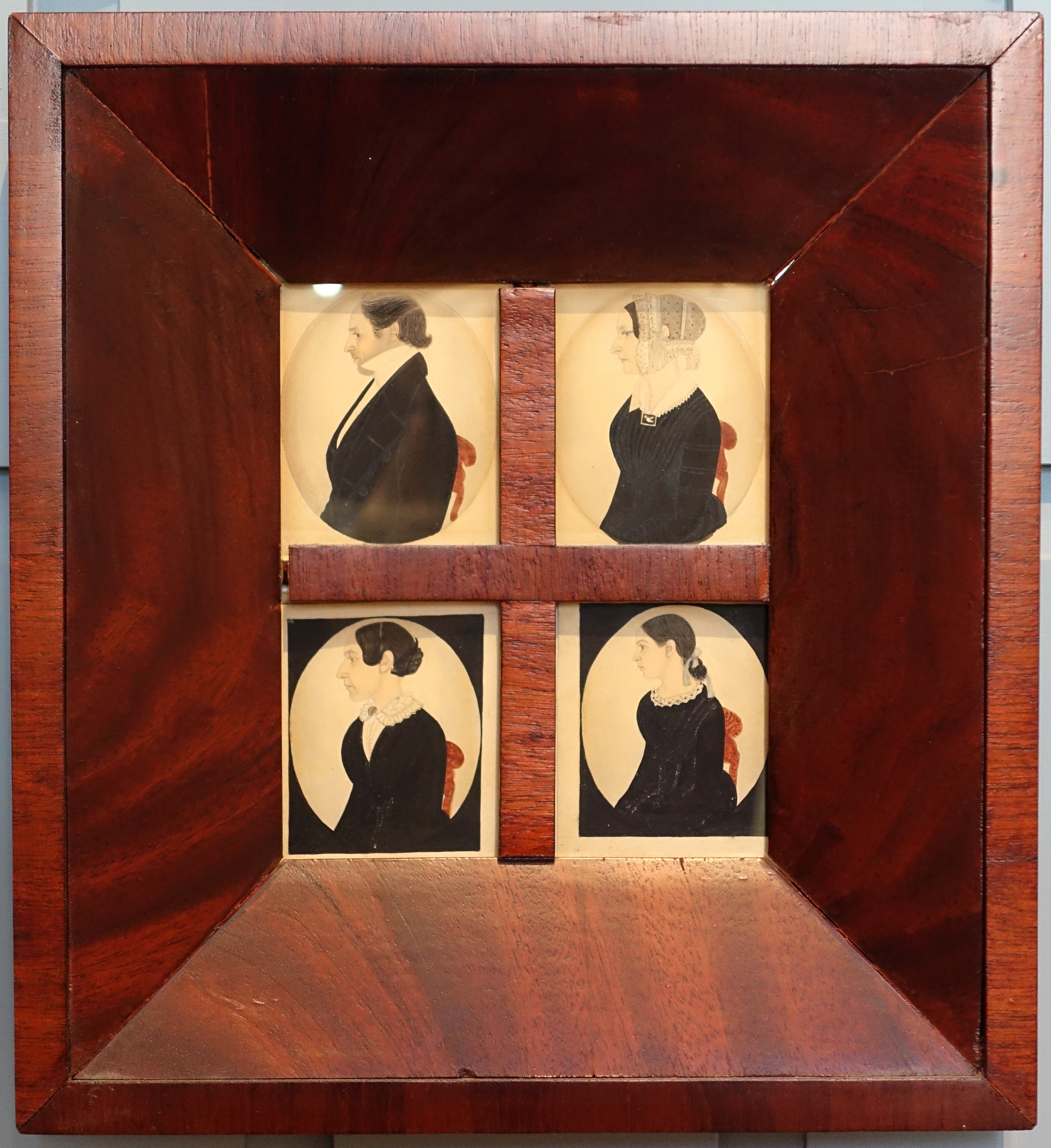
Dewey Family portraits, attributed to Justus DaLee and the DaLee family, c. 1840

Justus DaLee (October 1, 1793 – January 5, 1878) was an American folk artist born in Pittstown, New York to James Waterman DaLee and his wife, Anstis Kinnicutt. He married Mary Fowler October 13, 1816 at White Creek, New York, and they had ten children. He served as a musician in the War of 1812 and was a professor of penmanship.

DaLee was a school teacher in New York State and is also known to have worked in Massachusetts. He was known for his miniature naïve art side portraits. Media used were mixed media, oil, watercolor, and ink.

The earliest dated record of Justus DaLee's activity is a fifty-two page sketchbook entitled "Emblematic Figures, Representations, and Etc., to Please the Eye."

He died on January 5, 1878, in Eden, Wisconsin and is buried in the Odekirk Cemetery, Eden, Fond du Lac County, Wisconsin.
