= Joseph H. Hardgrove =

American politician

Joseph H. Hardgrove (November 26, 1870 – November 19, 1953) was an American physician, teacher and politician.

Born in Fond du Lac, Wisconsin, Hardgrove worked in the cooper trade. In 1903, he graduated from Oshkosh Normal School (now University of Wisconsin–Oshkosh). He then was principal of a school in Tigerton, Wisconsin, and helped to organize the Tigerton High School. He then became principal of Manawa High School in Manawa, Wisconsin. He received his medical degree from Marquette University Medical School in 1916 and then practiced medicine in Eden, Wisconsin. Hardgrove was president of the Fond du Lac Rural Normal School Board and was a Democrat. In 1933, he sat in the Wisconsin State Assembly.

In 1953, Hardgrove died at the house of a daughter in Shawano, Wisconsin.
