= Alfred L. Thwing =

American politician (1876–1945)

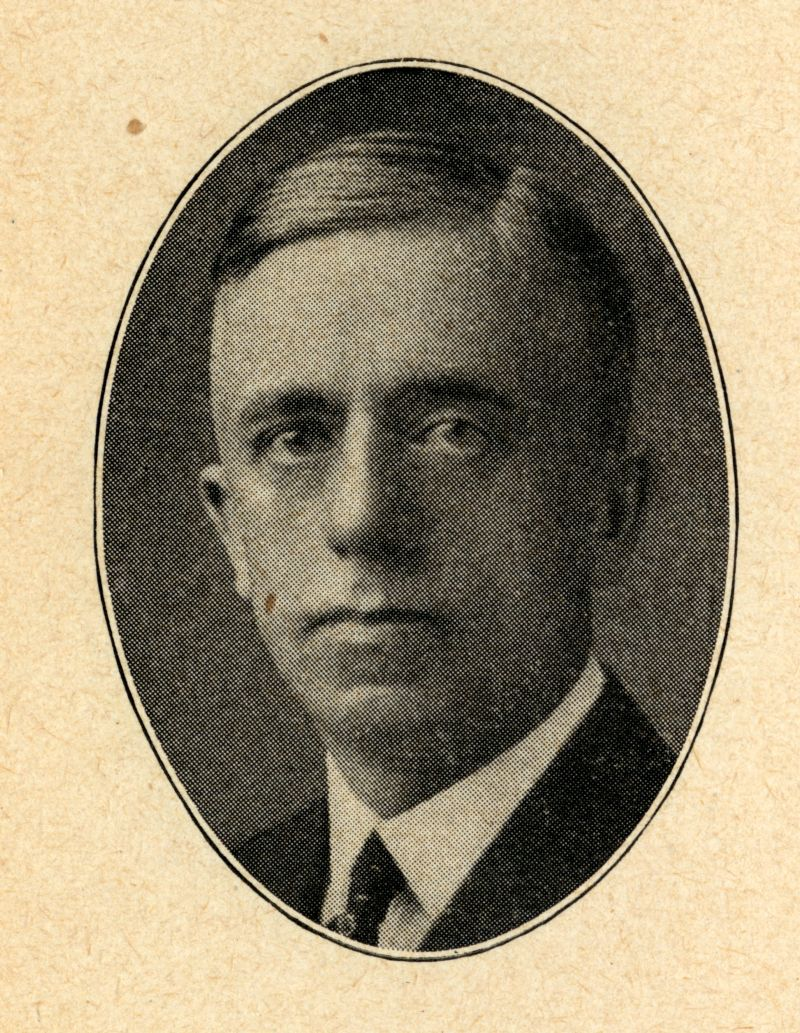

Member of the Minnesota Senate from the 52 district

Alfred L. Thwing (April 1, 1876 – August 24, 1945) was an American lawyer and politician who served in the Minnesota Senate from 1923 to 1930.

Thwing was born in Fond du Lac, Wisconsin. He moved to Minnesota in 1887 and lived in Minneapolis, Minnesota and in Duluth, Minnesota. Thwing went to the Duluth public schools. He received his law degree from University of Minnesota Law School in 1899 and was admitted to the Minnesota bar. In 1901, he moved to Grand Rapids, Itasca County, Minnesota. Thwing lived in Grand Rapids, Minnesota with his wife and family and practiced law in Grand Rapids. He was the Itasca County Attorney in 1906, and as probate clerk in Duluth, Minnesota from 1899 to 1901. He served in the Minnesota Senate from 1923 to 1930 representing district 52. Thwing then served as judge of the Minnesota District Court from 1930 until his death in 1945.
