= South Main Street Historic District (Fond du Lac, Wisconsin) =

Historic district in Wisconsin, United States

- U.S. National Register of Historic Places
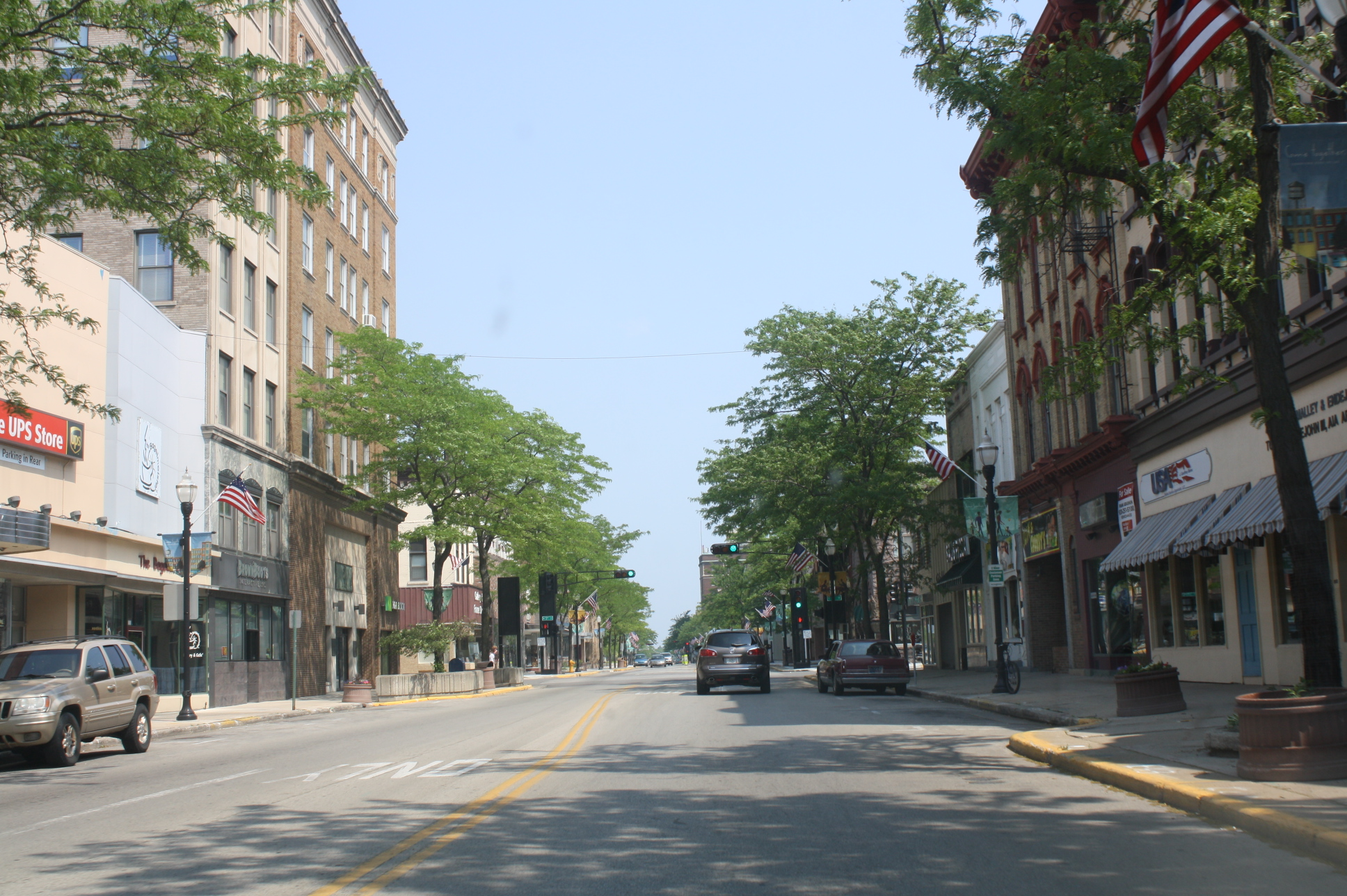
- A portion of the district.
- Location: Roughly, 71--213 S. Main St., Fond du Lac, Wisconsin
- Area: 6 acres (2.4 ha)
- NRHP reference No.: 93000160
- Added to NRHP: March 11, 1993

The South Main Street Historic District is located in Fond du Lac, Wisconsin.

== Description ==
The district is in the south end of the old downtown, including the 1875 Italianate Frieberg Grocery, the 1890 High Victorian Gothic Carstens' Meat Market, the 1903 Richardsonian Romanesque Commercial National Bank, the 1912 Neoclassical Citizens State Bank, and the 1923 Commercial-style Commercial National Bank.

It was added to the State and the National Register of Historic Places in 1993.
