= Catherine M. Klapperich =

American biomedical engineer

Catherine M. Klapperich is an American biomedical engineer noted for her research on diagnostics and precision medicine. She is currently a professor of biomedical engineering at Boston University, with additional appointments in materials science & engineering and mechanical engineering. Klapperich serves as the director of research for the DAMP Laboratory at BU. Klapperich was previously the director of the NIH NIBIB Center for Future Technologies in Cancer Care as part of the Point-of Care-Research Technologies Network.

== Education and career ==
Klapperich earned her B.S. in materials science and engineering from Northwestern University; her M.S. in engineering sciences from Harvard University; and, Ph.D. in mechanical engineering from the University of California, Berkeley with Lisa Pruitt. Klapperich did her doctoral studies on plasma treatment of biomaterials and nanoengineering for medical applications. Before joining the faculty at Boston University, Klapperich was a postdoctoral fellow at Lawrence Berkeley Laboratory working with Carolyn Bertozzi, and a senior research scientist at Aclara Biosciences in Mountain View, California.

Klapperich's research is focused on engineering medical devices for use in low resource settings and at the point of care. Research focuses on use of disposable microfluidic diagnostics that incorporate on-board sample preparation and minimally instrumented devices to enable molecular testing for cancer, women's health and sexually transmitted diseases. Klapperich and colleagues founded a startup company, Jane Diagnostics, that received start-up funding to commercialize these technologies.

During the global pandemic in 2020, Klapperich built the campus-wide testing laboratory for COVID-19 at Boston University.

== Honors and awards ==
Some of Klapperich's honors have included:

- Fellow (American Institute for Medical and Biological Engineering, 2014)
- Fellow (Biomedical Engineering Society, 2018)
- Fellow (American Association for the Advancement of Science, 2015)
- Power 50 for 2020, Extraordinary Year, Extraordinary People (Boston Business Journal)
- Societal Engineer Award, College of Engineering, Boston University 2021
