= Fond du Lac Light =

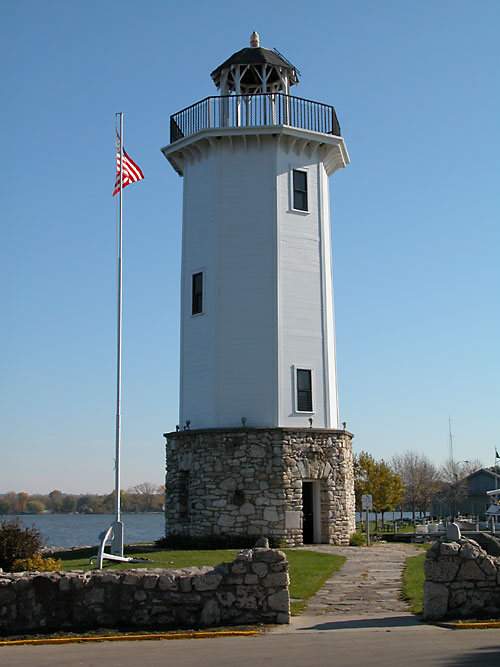
- Location: Lakeside Park, Fond du Lac, Wisconsin
- Coordinates: 43°47′51.54″N 88°26′14.09″W

Tower
- Constructed: 1933
- Construction: wood frame, flagstone base
- Height: 17 m (56 ft)

Light
- First lit: 1933
- Focal height: 18 m (59 ft)
- Characteristic: FI R

The Fond du Lac Light is a lighthouse located at the entrance to the harbor and Yacht Club, in Fond du Lac, Wisconsin. It is located on the southern end of Lake Winnebago (a separate light to the west marks the mouth of the Fond du Lac River). It is currently incorporated in the Fond du Lac City Seal. Construction of the lighthouse started in May 1933 and was completed shortly after October. It replaced an ordinary red light that previously marked the harbor entrance.

After years of neglect it was saved from demolition in 1967 and restored in 1993 with help from local community organizations.

The lighthouse is also the focal point of the seasonal holiday lights in Lakeside Park; a cutout of Rudolph the Red-Nosed Reindeer is adorned to the light house using the red light on top of the lighthouse as the nose.

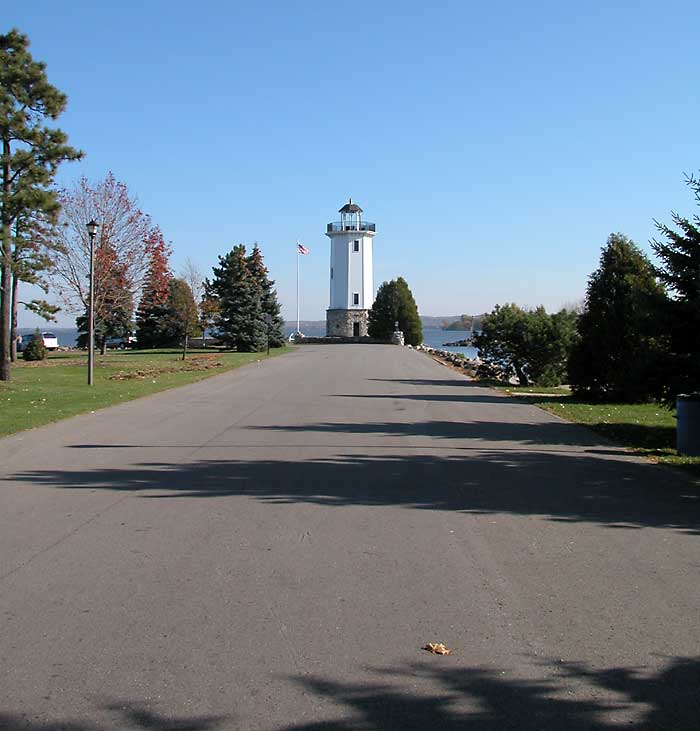
