= East Division Street–Sheboygan Street Historic District =

Historic district in Wisconsin, United States

- U.S. National Register of Historic Places
- U.S. Historic district
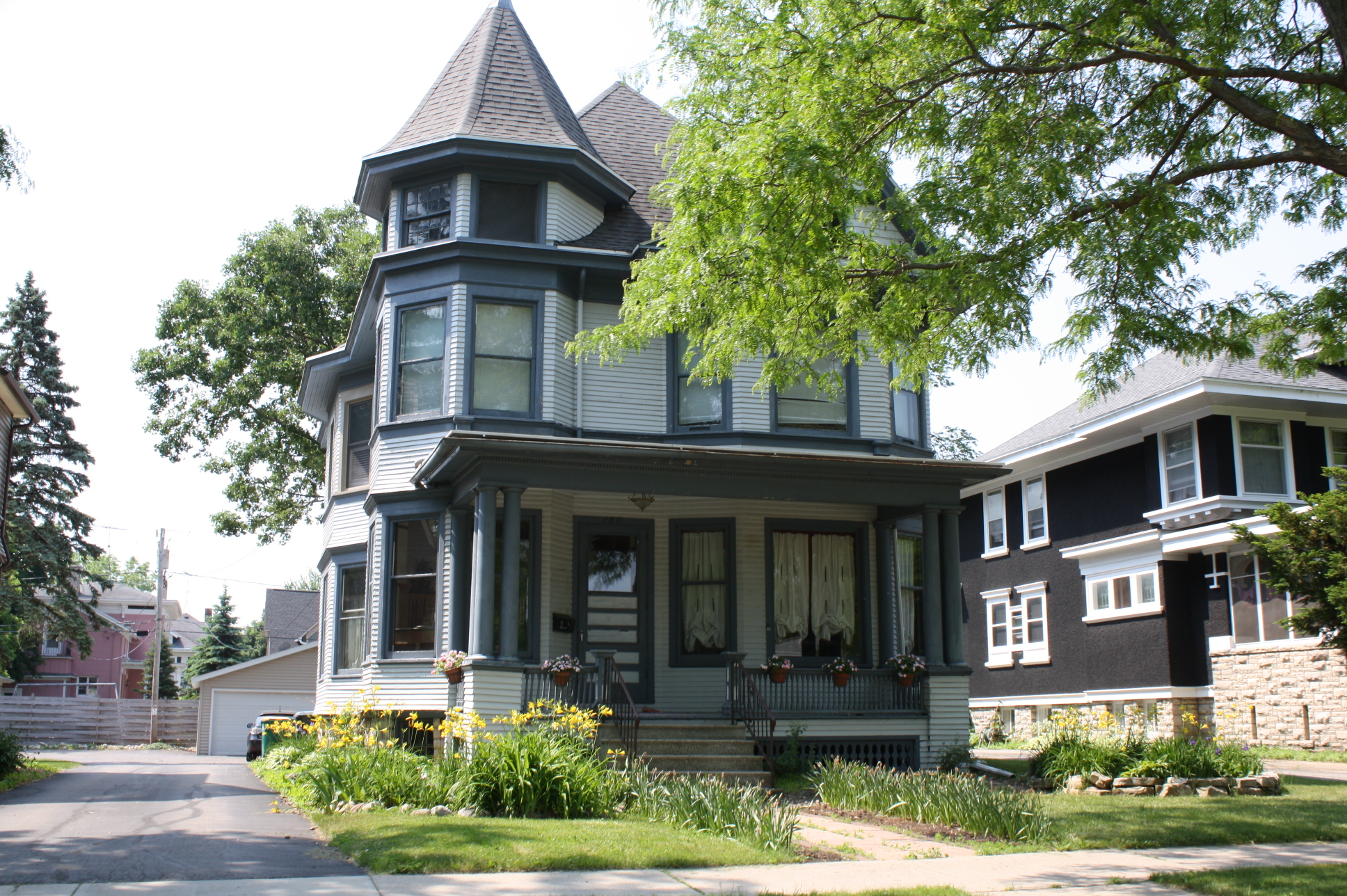
- A house located within the district

- Location within Wisconsin Location within the United States
- Location: Fond du Lac, Wisconsin
- NRHP reference No.: 10000169
- Added to NRHP: April 7, 2010

The East Division Street–Sheboygan Street Historic District is a residential historic district located in Fond du Lac, Wisconsin, United States. It was added to the National Register of Historic Places in 2010.

== History ==
Contributing buildings in the district were constructed from 1852 to 1933. Houses include one designed by George Franklin Barber in the Queen Anne style.
