= Saint Pier =

Saint Pier or St. Pier may refer to:

- St Pier (surname)
- Peter Damian, or St Pier Damiano (c. 1007–1072 or 1073), Italian monk and cardinal
- Pier Giorgio Frassati (1901–1925), Italian Catholic activist canonized in 2025

== See also ==
- Saint-Pierre (disambiguation)
- Saint Peter
