= Jim Dilling =

American high jumper

Personal information
- Born: 23 April 1985 (age 40) Fond du Lac, Wisconsin, United States

Sport
- Sport: Track and field

Jim Dilling (born April 23, 1985) is a former American high jumper who was the 2007 USA Outdoor champion. Dilling stands 6'5" and weighs 195 lbs. His personal best (2.30 m) was attained during the 2007 season. Dilling currently resides in Mankato, Minnesota, and when training was coached by Cliff Rovelto and represented by agent Ray Flynn. He currently is the head track and field coach for Minnesota State University, Mankato after the retirement of long time coach Mark Schuck.

== Education and career ==
In 2003, Dilling graduated from Fond du Lac High School in Wisconsin. Dilling then attended Minnesota State University, Mankato where he captured 4 Division II National Championships. He is a 2-time NCAA Division II Indoor champion (2006, 2007), 2-time NCAA Division II Outdoor champion (2005, 2007) and 5-time NCAA Division II All-American. He is the 2007 US National High Jump Champion.
