= Kate Pier =

American lawyer (1845–1925)

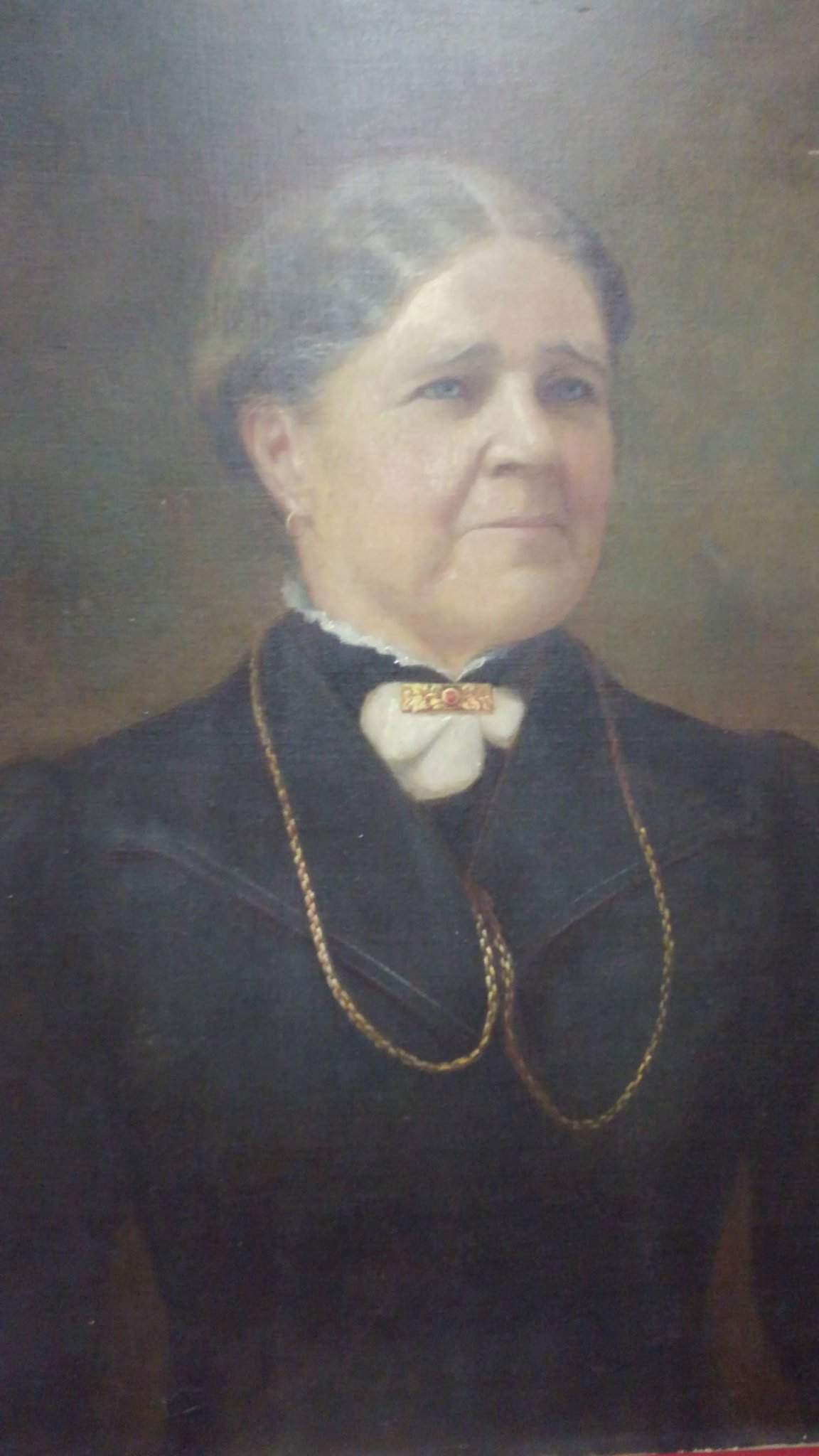
Kate Pier

Kate Pier (June 22, 1845 – June 25, 1925) was an American court commissioner and the first woman in the United States to be conferred with judicial powers.

== Early life ==
Kate Hamilton was born in St. Albans (town), Vermont, on June 22, 1845. Her father was John Hamilton and her mother Mary (née Meekin). Both parents were of Scots-Irish descent. When she was eight years old, the family moved to Fond du Lac, Wisconsin.

When 17, Hamilton graduated from Fond du Lac High School. She went on to teach in Empire, Wisconsin, and later in Fond du Lac for about three years.

== Career ==
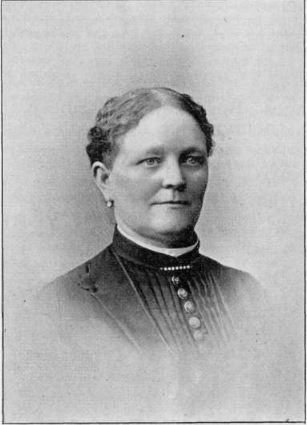
Kate Pier, 1893

After her father died in 1870, her mother lived with her. With the inheritance she received from her father, she went to law school and became a lawyer. Her three daughters, Kate Hamilton Pier McIntosh, Caroline Hamilton Pier Roemer and Harriet Hamilton Pier Simonds, would also attend law school. A fourth daughter, Mary, died while a student at the German and English Academy in Fond du Lac. Mother and daughters constituted a law firm practicing first in Fond du Lac and then, in 1888, in Milwaukee, Wisconsin. In 1891 Caroline and Harriet were admitted to the bar, and in this way mother and daughters were four of the eight female lawyers in Wisconsin.

In 1871 Pier began business life by assuming the charge of her mother's and her own share of a large estate left by her father. She worked from her father's office in the Darling Block, corner First and Main Streets, Fond du Lac, and from the bank and law office in which her husband had an interest. Her success brought others to her for assistance in their own affairs. As a result, from a general real estate business, in which there was naturally always a fair amount of legal work, Pier, under the advice of her friends, entered upon the profession of law, in which she paid special attention to real estate and probate law.

She wanted her daughters to begin business life under her personal supervision. She started alone and knew what pioneer business undertakings meant for a woman. She wished her girls to benefit from her experience. As it was a new venture for girls to enter law schools, she desired to take the course with her oldest. Pier and her daughter Kate began their legal studies together in the law department of the Wisconsin State University, in 1886. It was a unique precedent and brought the talented pair immediately into public notice. Pier received an LL.B. degree on June 22, 1887, on her 42nd birthday.

In 1892 she was appointed circuit Court Commissioner for Milwaukee County, Wisconsin. It was the first time in the United States that judicial powers had been conferred on a woman.

Pier was the first woman to vote in the Fond du Lac County, Wisconsin; it happened at an election years before women's suffrage in the United States.

She was a member of the First Presbyterian church in Fond du Lac. She was a member of the Woman's Relief Corps and of the Order of the Eastern Star. She was the only honorary member of the Milwaukee Business Women's Club. She was the president of the Portia Club and Dean of Psi chapter at Madison of the Kappa Beta Pi legal sorority. She was vice-president for Wisconsin of the National Association of Women Lawyers.

== Personal life ==
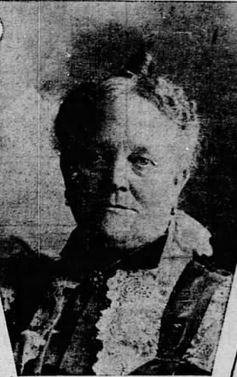
Kate Pier, 1902

On June 25, 1866, Kate Hamilton married Col Colwert Kendall Pier (died 1895), of Fond du Lac. They knew each other since they were children and he was the first man from Fond du Lac to enlist in the Union Army. He did four years of military service under General Grant and, after fulfilling his term of enlistment, he studied law in Albany, New York.

In addition to her own three daughters, assisted by her mother, Pier brought up two nephews from their infancy. They lived in the Pier homestead south of Fond du Lac which was built by Colwert Pier's father in the 1840s.

She died on June 23, 1925, at the family home in Fond du Lac, and is buried in the Hamilton family plot in the Reinzi Cemetery.

== Legacy ==
In 1982 Kate Pier was included in a book honoring 300 women from Wisconsin, released by the American Association of University Women as a part of the group's centennial celebration, Wisconsin Women: A Gifted Heritage.

Pier Elementary School in Fond du Lac is named after the family.
