= Fond du Lac School District =

School district in Wisconsin, United States

Address
- 72 W 9th St. Fond du Lac, Wisconsin United States
- Coordinates: 43.769060°N 88.449231°W

District information
- Type: Public School District
- Grades: PreK–12
- President: Kaitie Moder
- Vice-president: Mark Henschel
- Superintendent: Dr. Jeffrey Fleig
- School board: Mark Henschel, Katie Moder, Karen Moehn, Luke Frame, Joe Lavrenz, Tom Oliver, Joan Pennau
- Schools: Elementary: 10; Middle: 4 High: 2
- NCES District ID: 5504680

Students and staff
- Students: 6,457 (2024–254)
- Teachers: 482.81 (on an FTE basis)
- Staff: 849.18
- Student–teacher ratio: 13.37
- Athletic conference: Fox Valley Association

Other information
- Website: www.fonddulac.k12.wi.us

Fond du Lac School District is a school district located in Fond du Lac County in the U.S. state of Wisconsin. It currently enrolls about 7,000 students and operates 1 PreK school, 9 elementary schools, 4 middle schools, and two high schools: Fond du Lac High School and an alternative high school for at-risk students. The district is governed by a seven-person Board of Education elected at large for three-year terms and is administered by a superintendent of schools. The board president is Kaitie Moder, and the superintendent is Dr. Jeffrey Fleig.

== Schools ==
=== High schools ===
- Fond du Lac High School

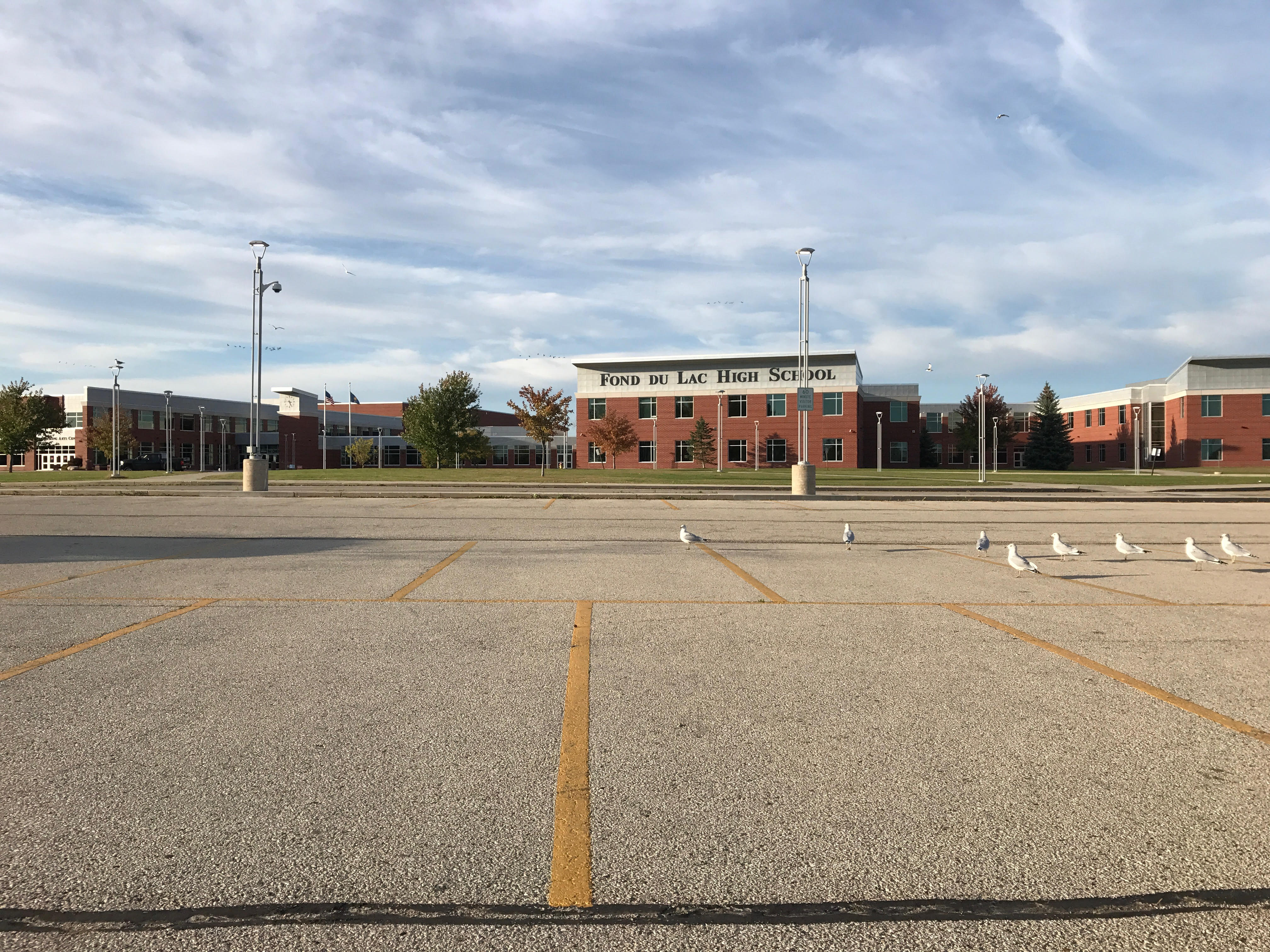
Fond du Lac High School

=== Middle schools ===
- Sabish Middle School
- Theisen Middle School
- Woodworth Middle School

=== Elementary schools ===
- Chegwin Elementary School
- Evans Elementary School
- Lakeshore Elementary School
- Parkside Elementary School
- Pier Elementary School
- Riverside Elementary School
- Roberts Elementary School
- Rosenow Elementary School
- Waters Elementary School

== Early learning ==
- Early Learning in Fond Du Lac

== Alternative and charter schools ==
- STEM Academy
- Fondy Central (Alternative High School)

== Former schools ==
Goodrich High School was the high school for the Fond du Lac School District from 1922 to 2001, when the current building was built. Since 2001 the building has been used as Riverside Elementary, and district offices. It also is still the location of the aquatic center, and Fruth Memorial Field, the home football field for the Fond du Lac Cardinals, and formerly, the St. Mary's Springs Ledgers.

Franklin School has been converted to a building for the STEM Academy and Institute.

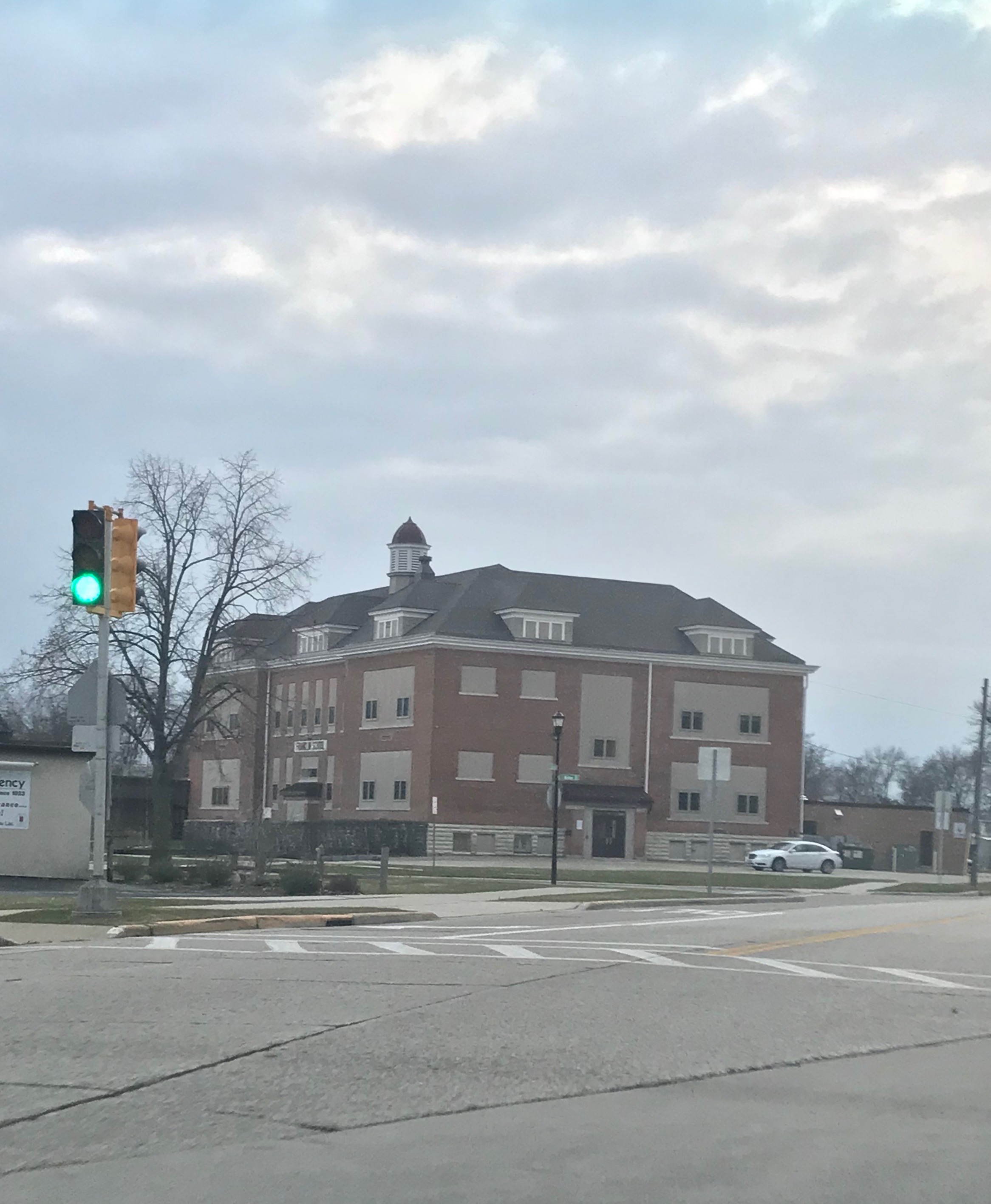
The Franklin School building in Fond du Lac, Wisconsin
