= Fond du Lac High School =

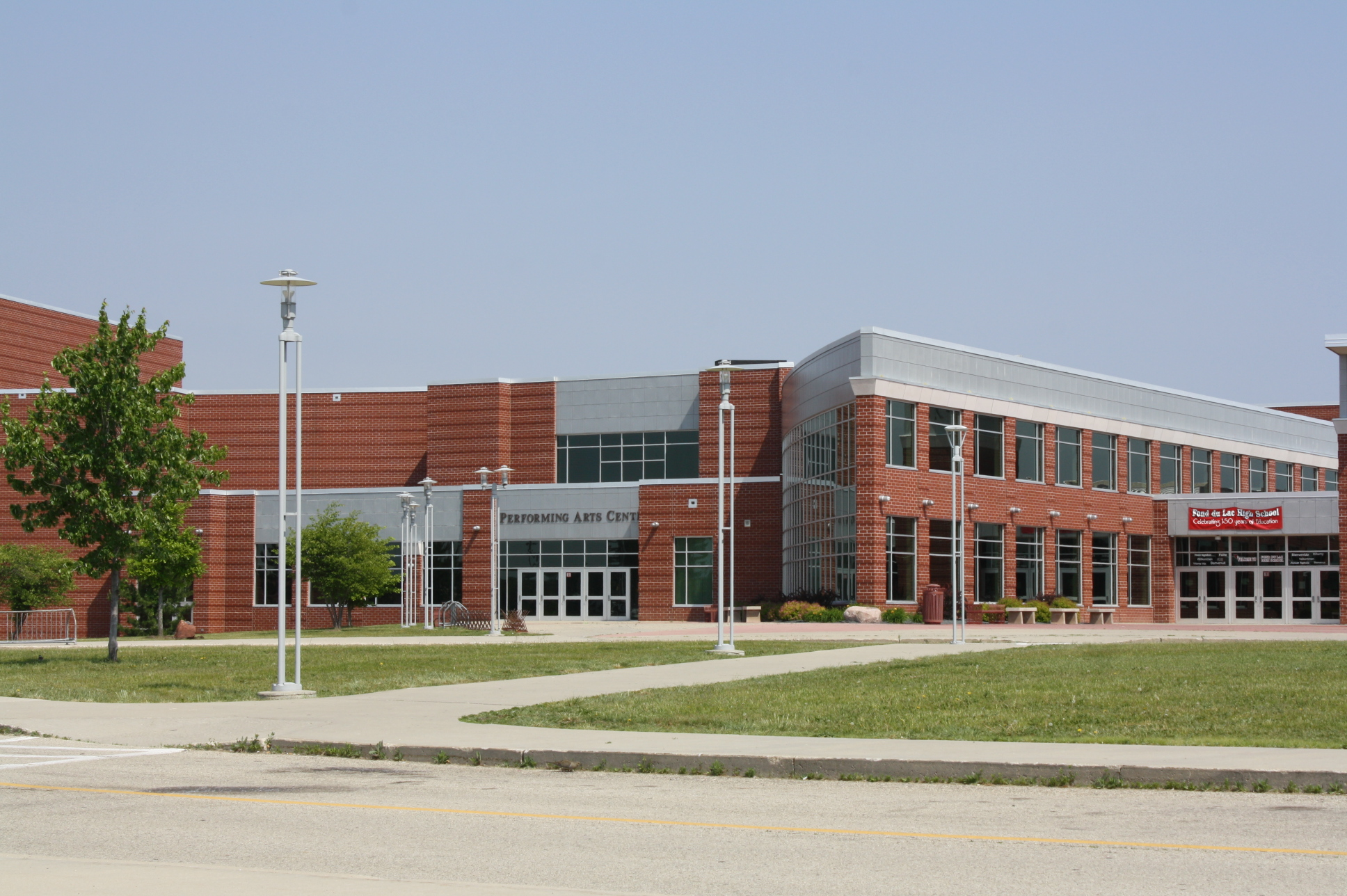
- Entrance and Performing Arts Center

Location
- 801 Campus Drive; Fond du Lac, Wisconsin 54935; United States
- 43.7950904°N 88.4166493°W

Information
- Opened: 2001
- School district: Fond du Lac School District
- NCES District ID: 5504680
- Superintendent: Jeffrey Fleig
- CEEB code: 500668
- NCES School ID: 550468000498
- Principal: Dave Michalkiewicz
- Staff: 114.00 (on an FTE basis)
- Grades: 9-12
- Enrollment: 1,928 (2023-2024)
- Student to teacher ratio: 16.91
- Colors: Maroon and White
- Mascot: Cardinal
- Nickname: Fondy High
- Newspaper: Cardinal Columns
- Yearbook: The Cardinal
- Feeder schools: Sabish Middle School, Woodworth Middle School, Theisen Middle School, STEM Institute
- WIAA Conference: Fox Valley Association
- Website: School page

Fond du Lac High School ("Fondy High") is a comprehensive public high school in Fond du Lac, Wisconsin, United States. It is administered by the Fond du Lac School District. Opened in 2001, the school replaced the former Goodrich High School, which was the city's high school from 1922 to 2001. Fond du Lac High School has an enrollment of approximately 2,000 students. Its athletic teams are known as the Cardinals.

== Design ==
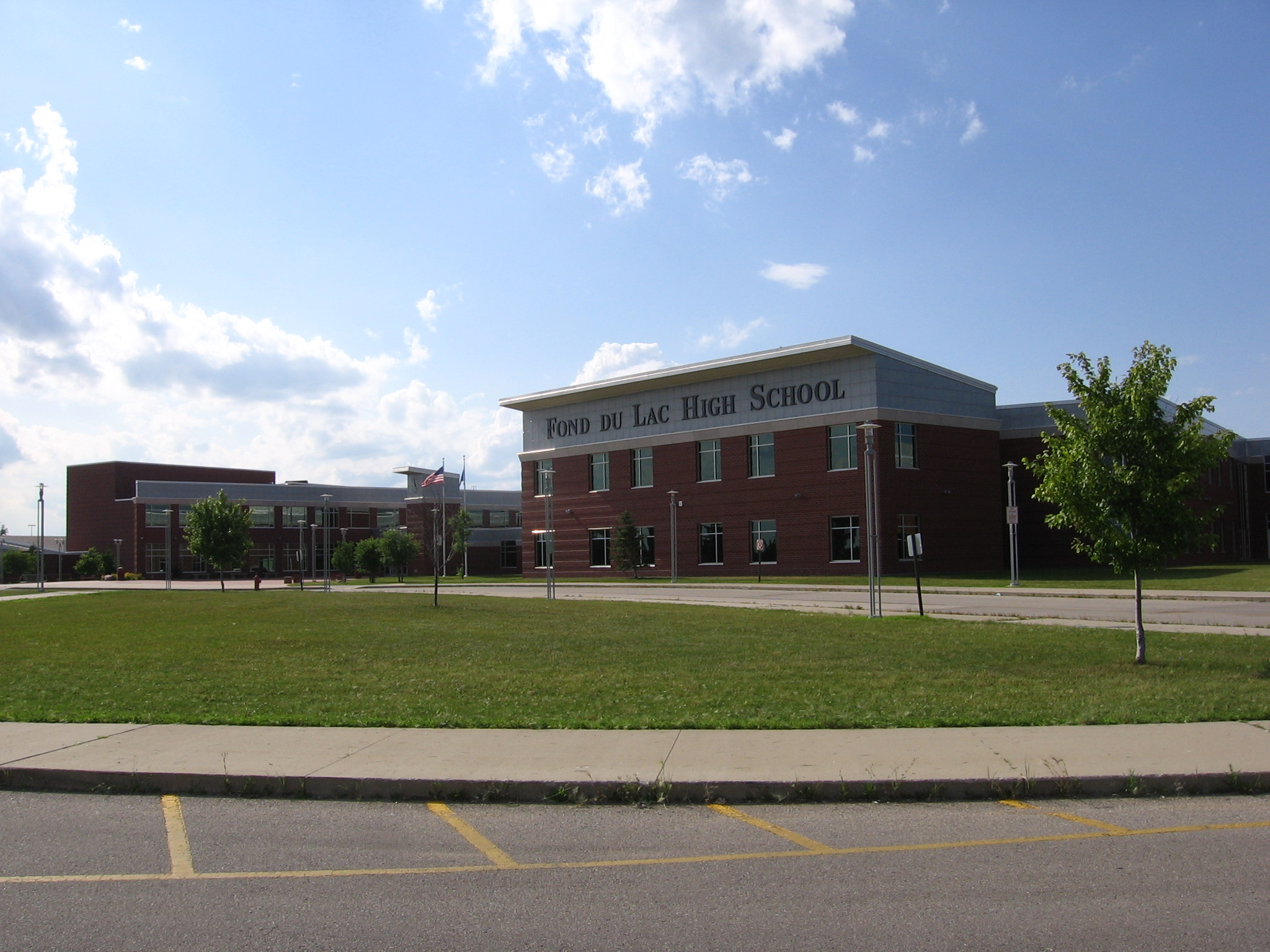
Front side, including clock tower

The educational wing of the school is shaped like an "H". The school is surrounded by retaining ponds, which are fitted with geothermal heat pumps that regulate the temperature of the school during the year. This is saving the school thousands each year in heating and cooling costs.

== Academics ==
Advanced Placement (AP) classes offered at Fond du Lac High School include calculus, chemistry, physics, psychology, U.S. politics and government, biology, U.S. History, statistics, computer science, music theory, language and composition, and literature and composition. A few CAPP (Cooperative Academic Partnership Programs) and other concurrent enrollment options are offered by the University of Wisconsin–Oshkosh.

== Athletics ==
The school competes in the Fox Valley Association conference in all sports except football, which is in the Valley Football Association. 24 sports are currently offered:

Fall	Winter	Spring
Girls' Swimming and Diving	Boys' Basketball	Baseball
Girls' Cross Country	Girls' Basketball	Softball
Boys' Cross Country	Girls' Hockey	Girls' Track
Boys' Volleyball	Boys' Hockey	Boys' Track
Girls' Volleyball	Wrestling	Girls' Soccer
Girls' Tennis	Boys' Swimming and Diving	Boys' Golf
Boys' Soccer		
Girls' Golf		
Football		
Dance		
Cheer		

The football team is notable for having ended two of the longest winning streaks in Wisconsin high school history. On October 31, 1987, the Cardinals ended the then-record 48-game winning streak of Manitowoc Lincoln Ships with a 27–15 victory at Fruth Field in Fond du Lac in the sectional final (quarterfinals) of the WIAA playoffs. On August 17, 2018, the Cardinals again snapped a record winning streak, this one the 70-game winning streak of the Kimberly Papermakers, with a 31–28 victory in Kimberly.

== Controversy ==
In 2014, following publication of an article in the school newspaper about the rape culture in the school, the principal announced that all articles written for the school paper would require his approval before publication. The change in the school's policy led to a petition to reverse the policy change, a student sit-in, and national media attention. The principal resigned at the end of the 2014 school year.

== Notable alumni ==
- Braelon Allen, NFL running back for the New York Jets
- Travis Diener, 2001, former professional basketball player
- Jim Dilling, national champion high jumper
- Bill Guilfoile, American professional baseball public relations executive
- Josh Kaul, 1999, Wisconsin Attorney General
- Ann Klapperich, former professional basketball player
- Kate Everest Levi (1859–1939), social worker, first woman Ph.D. from the University of Wisconsin
- Scott McCallum, 1969, 43rd governor of Wisconsin, 41st Lieutenant Governor and 18th District State Senator
- Charles Henry Morgan, U.S. Representative from Missouri
- John Abner Race, U.S. Representative, 1965–1967
- Cory Raymer, former professional football player for the Washington Redskins and San Diego Chargers of the NFL.
- Eric Schafer, professional mixed martial arts fighter
- Robert Windsor, professional football player
