= Eden, Wisconsin =

Eden
- Village
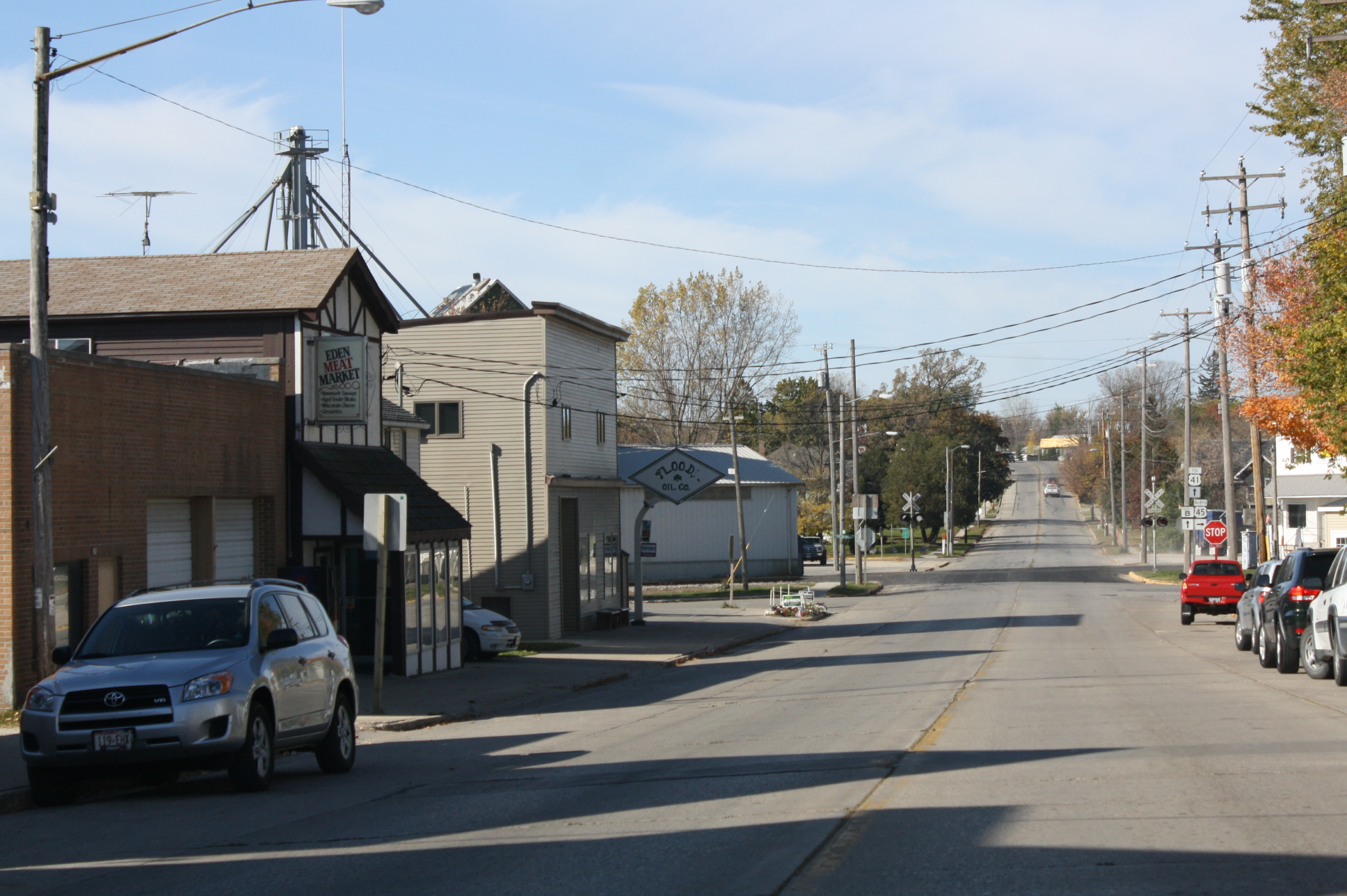
- Downtown Eden on US 45

- Location of Eden in Fond du Lac County, Wisconsin

- Location within the state of Wisconsin
- Coordinates: 43°41′35″N 88°21′42″W
- Country: United States
- State: Wisconsin
- County: Fond du Lac

Area
  - Total: 0.62 sq mi (1.60 km^{2})
  - Land: 0.60 sq mi (1.55 km^{2})
  - Water: 0.015 sq mi (0.04 km^{2})

Population (2020)
  - Total: 884
  - Density: 1,473.3/sq mi (568.8/km^{2})
- Time zone: UTC-6 (Central (CST))
  - Summer (DST): UTC-5 (CDT)
- Area code: 920
- FIPS code: 55-22475
- Website: Village of Eden

Eden is a village in Fond du Lac County, Wisconsin, United States. The population was 884 at the 2020 census. The village is located within the Town of Eden.

== History ==
A post office called Eden was first established in 1850. Eden was named after either the Garden of Eden or after John Eden, an early settler.

== Geography ==
Eden is located at 43°41′35″N 88°21′42″W (43.693077, -88.361805).

According to the United States Census Bureau, the village has a total area of 0.62 square miles (1.61 km^{2}), of which 0.60 square miles (1.55 km^{2}) is land and 0.02 square miles (0.05 km^{2}) is water.

== Demographics ==
Historical population
Census	Pop.	Note	%±
1880	83		—
1920	176		—
1930	223		26.7%
1940	223		0.0%
1950	234		4.9%
1960	312		33.3%
1970	376		20.5%
1980	534		42.0%
1990	610		14.2%
2000	687		12.6%
2010	875		27.4%
2020	884		1.0%
U.S. Decennial Census

=== 2020 census ===
As of the 2020 census, there were 884 people, 329 households, and 130 families living in the village. The population density was 1,473.3 inhabitants per square mile (568.8/km^{2}). There were 375 housing units at an average density of 625.0 per square mile (241.3/km^{2}). The racial makeup of the village was 86.8% White, 0.1% Black or African American, 0.5% Native American, 0.2% Asian, 5.5% from other races, and 6.9% from two or more races. Hispanic or Latino of any race were 10.3% of the population

=== 2010 census ===
As of the census of 2010, there were 875 people, 337 households, and 235 families living in the village. The population density was 1,458.3 inhabitants per square mile (563.1/km^{2}). There were 360 housing units at an average density of 600.0 per square mile (231.7/km^{2}). The racial makeup of the village was 94.5% White, 0.2% African American, 0.7% Native American, 0.3% Asian, 2.6% from other races, and 1.6% from two or more races. Hispanic or Latino of any race were 4.7% of the population.

There were 337 households, of which 35.6% had children under the age of 18 living with them, 55.5% were married couples living together, 8.3% had a female householder with no husband present, 5.9% had a male householder with no wife present, and 30.3% were non-families. 24.3% of all households were made up of individuals, and 9.2% had someone living alone who was 65 years of age or older. The average household size was 2.60 and the average family size was 3.09.

The median age in the village was 34.3 years. 25.5% of residents were under the age of 18; 11.4% were between the ages of 18 and 24; 26.8% were from 25 to 44; 23.6% were from 45 to 64; and 12.8% were 65 years of age or older. The gender makeup of the village was 50.2% male and 49.8% female.

=== 2000 census ===
As of the census of 2000, there were 687 people, 264 households, and 181 families living in the village. The population density was 1,321.2 people per square mile (510.1/km^{2}). There were 303 housing units at an average density of 582.7 per square mile (225.0/km^{2}). The racial makeup of the village was 98.11% White, 0.15% Native American, 1.46% from other races, and 0.29% from two or more races. 4.22% of the population were Hispanic or Latino of any race.

There were 264 households, out of which 35.2% had children under the age of 18 living with them, 58.7% were married couples living together, 7.2% had a female householder with no husband present, and 31.1% were non-families. 25.0% of all households were made up of individuals, and 10.2% had someone living alone who was 65 years of age or older. The average household size was 2.60 and the average family size was 3.16.

In the village, the population was spread out, with 30.4% under the age of 18, 6.6% from 18 to 24, 31.9% from 25 to 44, 17.5% from 45 to 64, and 13.7% who were 65 years of age or older. The median age was 34 years. For every 100 females, there were 102.7 males. For every 100 females age 18 and over, there were 98.3 males.

The median income for a household in the village was $41,579, and the median income for a family was $48,571. Males had a median income of $35,804 versus $22,031 for females. The per capita income for the village was $19,614. About 3.4% of families and 4.2% of the population were below the poverty line, including 6.5% of those under age 18 and 5.8% of those age 65 or over.

== Notable people ==
- Warren Braun, Wisconsin politician
- Justus DaLee, folk artist
- Jim Gantner, baseball player
- Rick Gudex, Wisconsin politician
- Joseph H. Hardgrove, Wisconsin politician and physician
- Kurt W. Schuller, Wisconsin politician
- Steve Abel, Wisconsin Dairy Farmer

== Images ==
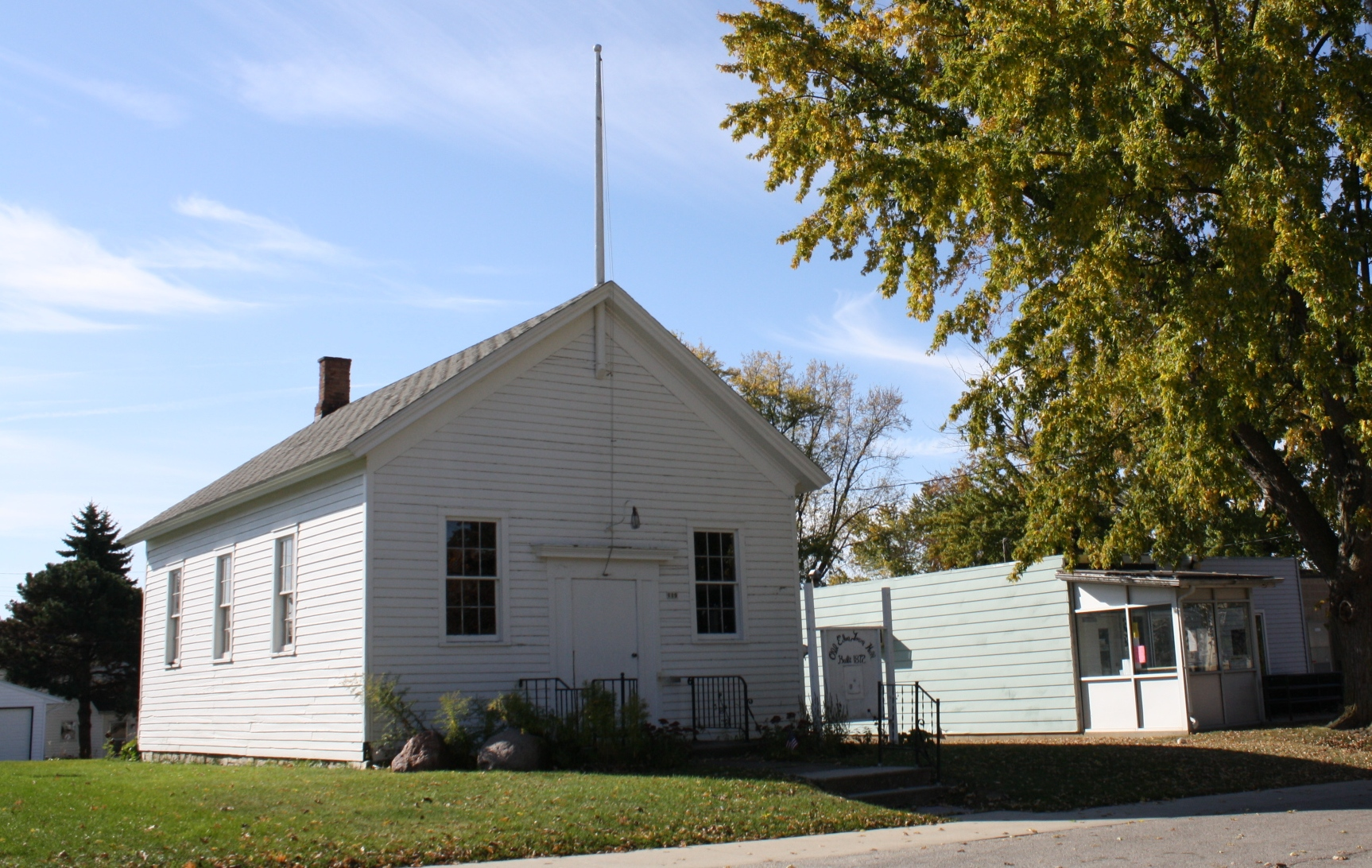
Post office / Old town hall

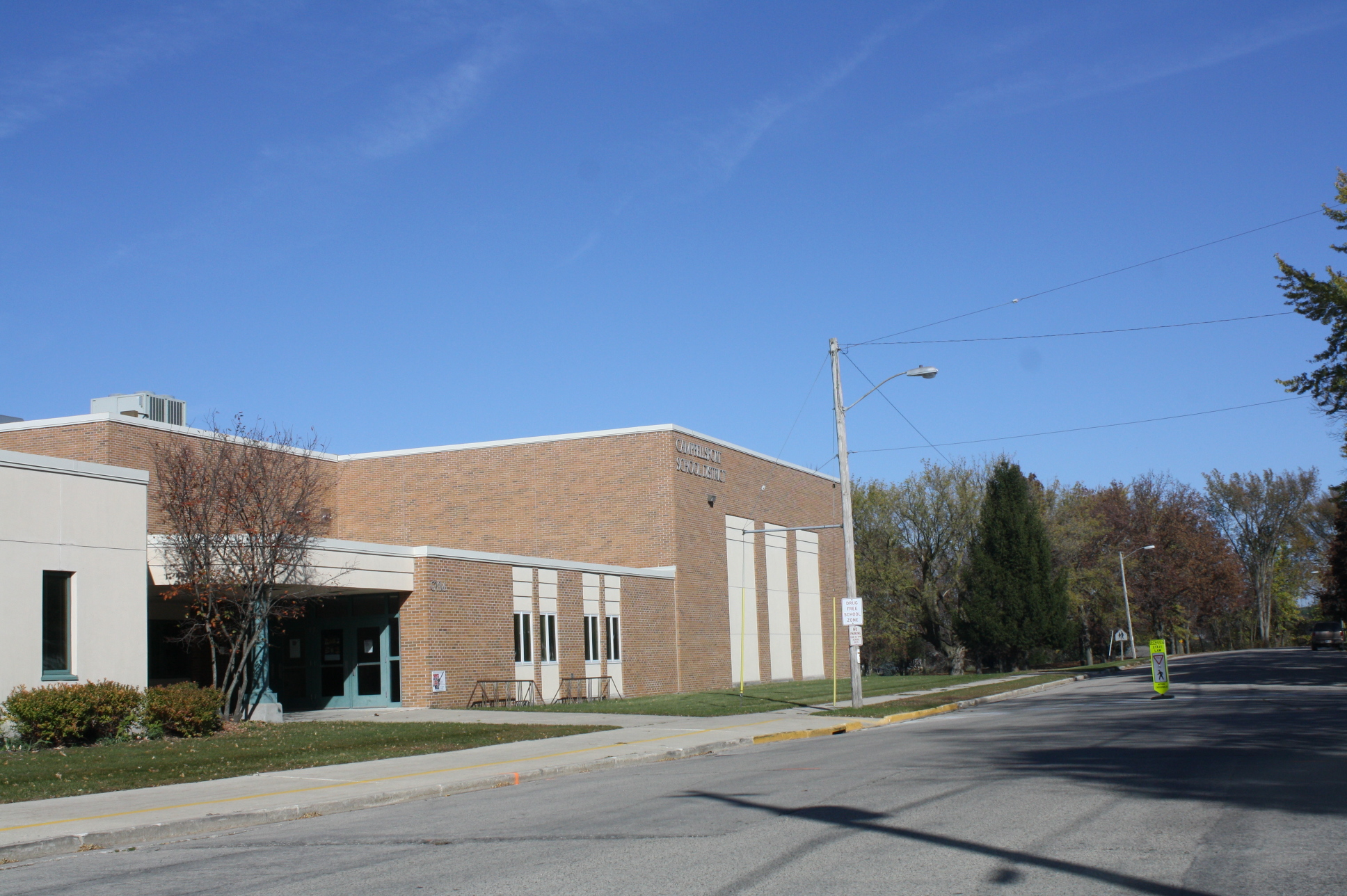
School

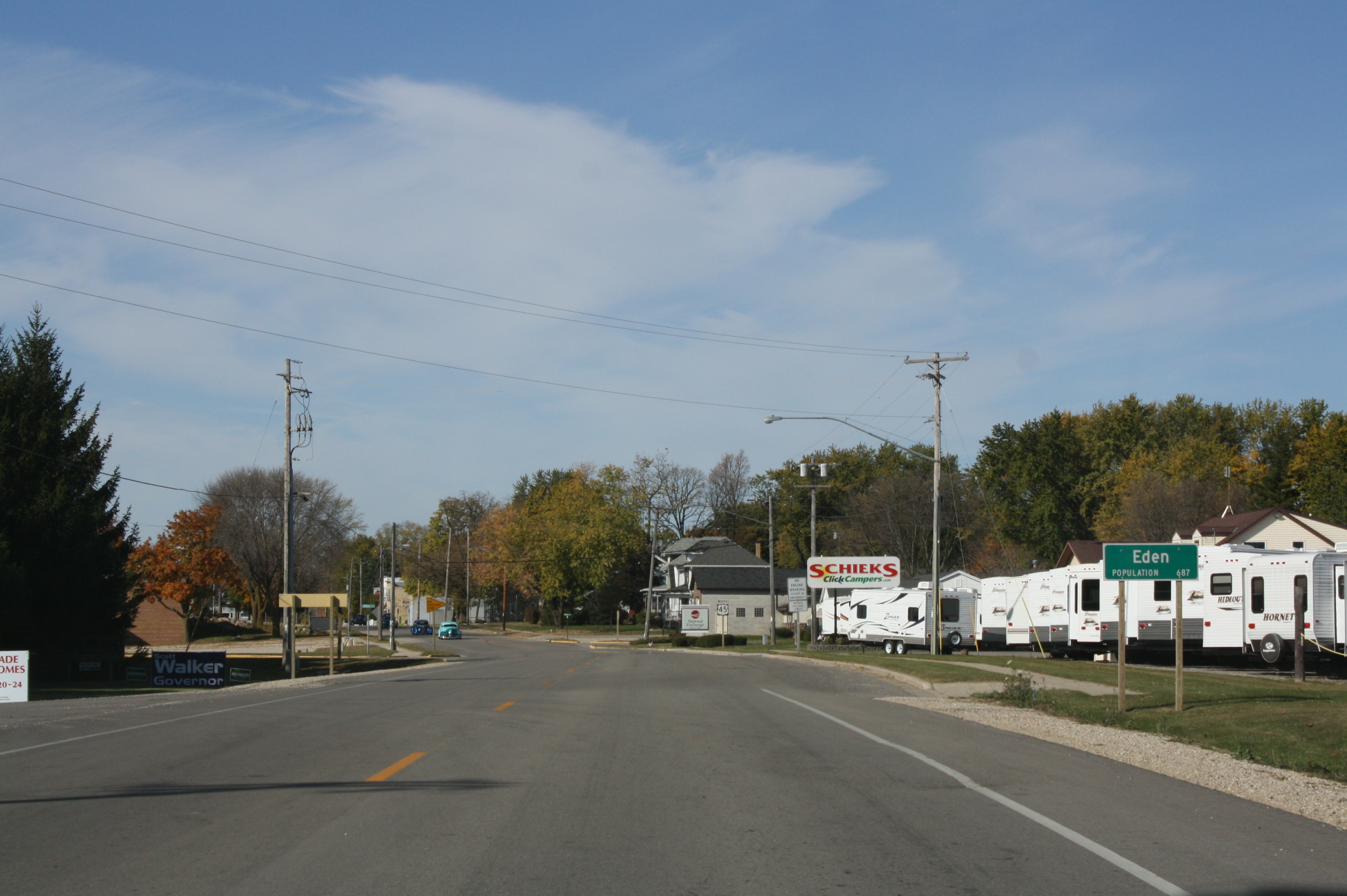
Sign on U.S. 45
