= Ann Klapperich =

American basketball player (born 1976)

Ann Klapperich (born 1976) is an American basketball player.

== Early life ==
Klapperich was born in Fond du Lac, Wisconsin. She attended Lowell P. Goodrich High School in Fond du Lac. As a child, Klapperich played almost every sport. As an 11-year-old in 1987 in the Fond du Lac Youth Baseball Minor Leagues, she struck out 76 batters (an average of more than two per inning), while giving up just 17 hits. She also batted .470. Klapperich also played quarterback in an organized youth tackle football league.

== High school career ==
A three-sport athlete, Klapperich was a three-time first-team All-Fox Valley Association shortstop in softball and a first-team All-FVA selection in volleyball as a junior (she didn't play volleyball as a senior).

Klapperich was most successful in basketball, where, at 6-foot-1, she was regarded as the strongest and most physically dominant player in the state. Behind Klapperich, the Cardinals won three FVA championships and posted a 77–16 record with one WIAA State Tournament appearance during her career.

Klapperich was the AP Wisconsin Player of the Year as a senior in 1994. She also was a first-team AP All-State as a junior and was on the second and third teams, respectively, as a sophomore and freshman. She gained first-team All-FVA honors four times, and as a senior Klapperich led the FVA in scoring, assists and steals and was second in rebounds - a category she had led the previous three seasons.

In 2009, Klapperich was inducted into the inaugural Hall of Fame class at Fond du Lac High School

For her career, Klapperich holds school records in points (1,944) and rebounds (1,239).

== College career ==
Klapperich played forward at the University of Wisconsin-Madison from 1994 to 1998. She was selected in Third Team All Big 10 in 1997 and got an Honorable Mention All Big 10 in 1998. In 113 games, she ranks

- 9th in career points scored (1,543) and 11th in points per game (13.70)
- 10th in rebounds (663) and 18th in rebounds per game (4.99)
- 5th in most field goals (598), 14th in most field goal attempts (1175) and 7th in field goal percentage (0.509)
- 6th in most free throws (338) and most free throw attempts (452) and 11th in free throw percentage (0.748)
- 11th in steals (188) and 13th in steals per game (1.67)
- 18th in games played (113)
- 9th in double-doubles (14)
- 9th in double figure scoring (84)

== Professional career ==
After college, Klapperich played one year professionally overseas in Portugal (Olivais Futebol). Currently, she works as assistant strength and conditioning coach at Southeast Missouri State University.
