= Lisa Pruitt =

American mechanical engineer

Lisa Anne Pruitt
- Born: April 2, 1966 (age 60); Cambridge, Massachusetts, U.S.
- Education: University of Rhode Island (BS); Brown University (MS, PhD)
- Occupations: Mechanical engineer, author
- Employer: University of California, Berkeley
- Known for: Orthopedic biomaterials Failure analysis of medical polymers Leadership in STEM mentoring
- Awards: NSF CAREER Award; Presidential Award for Excellence in Mentoring
- Website: me.berkeley.edu/people/lisa-pruitt/

Lisa Anne Pruitt (born April 2, 1966) is an American mechanical engineer known for her research on orthopedic biomaterials and medical polymers.

== Early life and education ==
Born in Cambridge, Massachusetts, Pruitt double-majored in Materials Engineering and Chemical and Ocean Engineering at the University of Rhode Island, earning two bachelor's degrees in 1988. She earned her master's and PhD degrees from Brown University in 1990 and 1993 respectively.

== Career and research ==
She began her career at the University of California, Berkeley in 1993 as an assistant professor of mechanical engineering; she was appointed a chancellor’s professor in 2004 and Lawrence Talbot Chair in engineering in 2007. In addition to her position as professor of mechanical engineering, she is also a professor of bioengineering at UC Berkeley and an adjunct professor of orthopaedic surgery at the University of California, San Francisco.

== Honors and awards ==
Notable awards include

- UC Berkeley's Distinguished Teaching Award
- U.S. Presidential Award for Excellence in Science, Mathematics and Engineering Mentoring
- Fellow of the American Association for the Advancement of Science
- National Science Foundation CAREER Award
- 2011 Winner of the A. Richard Newton ABIE Award from the Anita Borg Institute.
