= Pieri (surname) =

Pieri is an Italian surname. Notable people with the surname include:

- Alessandro Pieri (born 1963), Italian sprint canoeist
- Anna Pieri Brignole Sale (1765–1815), a Sienese noblewoman
- Claudio Pieri (1940–2018), Italian football referee
- Damon Pieri (born 1970), American football player
- Dario Pieri (born 1975), Italian former road bicycle racer
- Enrico Pieri (1934–2021), Italian child, survived a German massacre of Italian villagers during World War II
- Francesco Pieri (1902–1961), Italian Roman Catholic bishop
- Gianfranco Pieri (born 1937), Italian basketball player
- Giovanni Antonio De Pieri, known as il Zoppo Vicentino (1671–1751), Italian painter of the Baroque style
- Jessica Pieri (born 1997), Italian tennis player
- Louis Pieri (1897–1967), American basketball and ice hockey executive and coach
- Mario Pieri (1860–1913), Italian mathematician
- Massimiliano Pieri (born 1964), Italian musician, drummer, producer, director
- Mirko Pieri (born 1978), Italian football manager and former player
- Pieris Pieri (born 1996), Cypriot alpine ski racer
