= Fond du Lac, Wisconsin =

City in Wisconsin, United States

- City
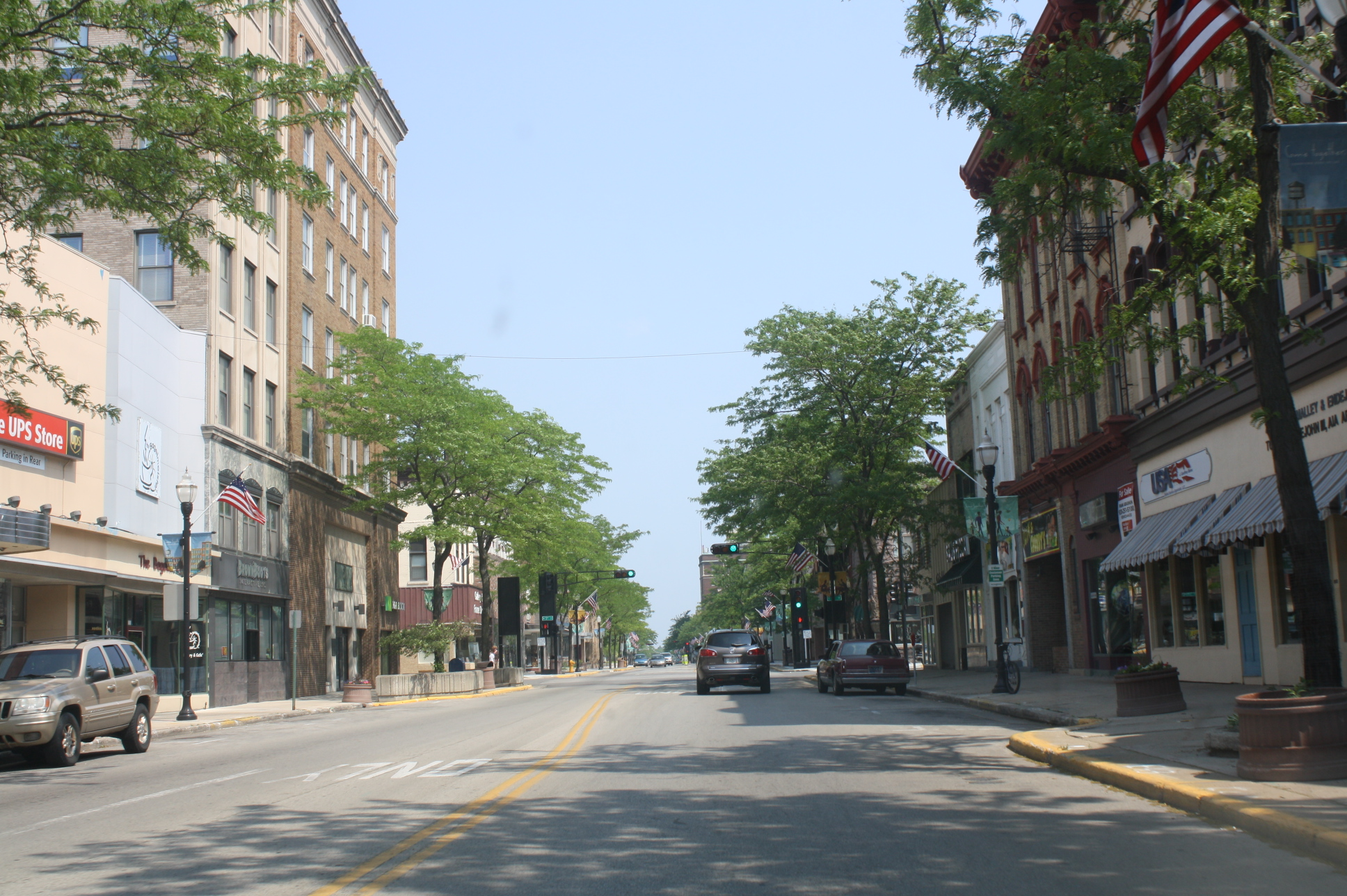
- South Main Street Historic District
- Interactive map of Fond du Lac, Wisconsin
- Location within Wisconsin Location within the United States
- Coordinates: 43°46′N 88°27′W
- Country: United States
- State: Wisconsin
- County: Fond du Lac
- Settled: 1836
- Incorporated (village): March 1, 1847; 179 years ago
- Incorporated (city): April 6, 1852; 174 years ago

Government
  - Type: Council-manager
  - City manager: Joseph P. Moore
  - Council president: Tiffany Brault

Area
  - City: 20.54 sq mi (53.19 km^{2})
  - Land: 19.23 sq mi (49.80 km^{2})
  - Water: 1.31 sq mi (3.39 km^{2}) 6.41%
- Elevation: 761 ft (232 m)

Population (2020)
  - City: 44,678
  - Density: 2,324/sq mi (897.2/km^{2})
  - Metro: 104,154 (US: 349th)
- Time zone: UTC−6 (CST)
  - Summer (DST): UTC−5 (CDT)
- Zip Codes: 54935, 54936, 54937
- Area code: 920
- FIPS code: 55-26275
- Website: www.fdl.wi.gov

Fond du Lac (/ˈfɒndəlæk/) is a city in Fond du Lac County, Wisconsin, United States, and its county seat. It is at the southern end of Lake Winnebago and had a population of 44,678 at the 2020 census. The city forms the core of the Fond du Lac metropolitan statistical area, which includes all of Fond du Lac County and had 104,154 residents in 2020.

== History ==
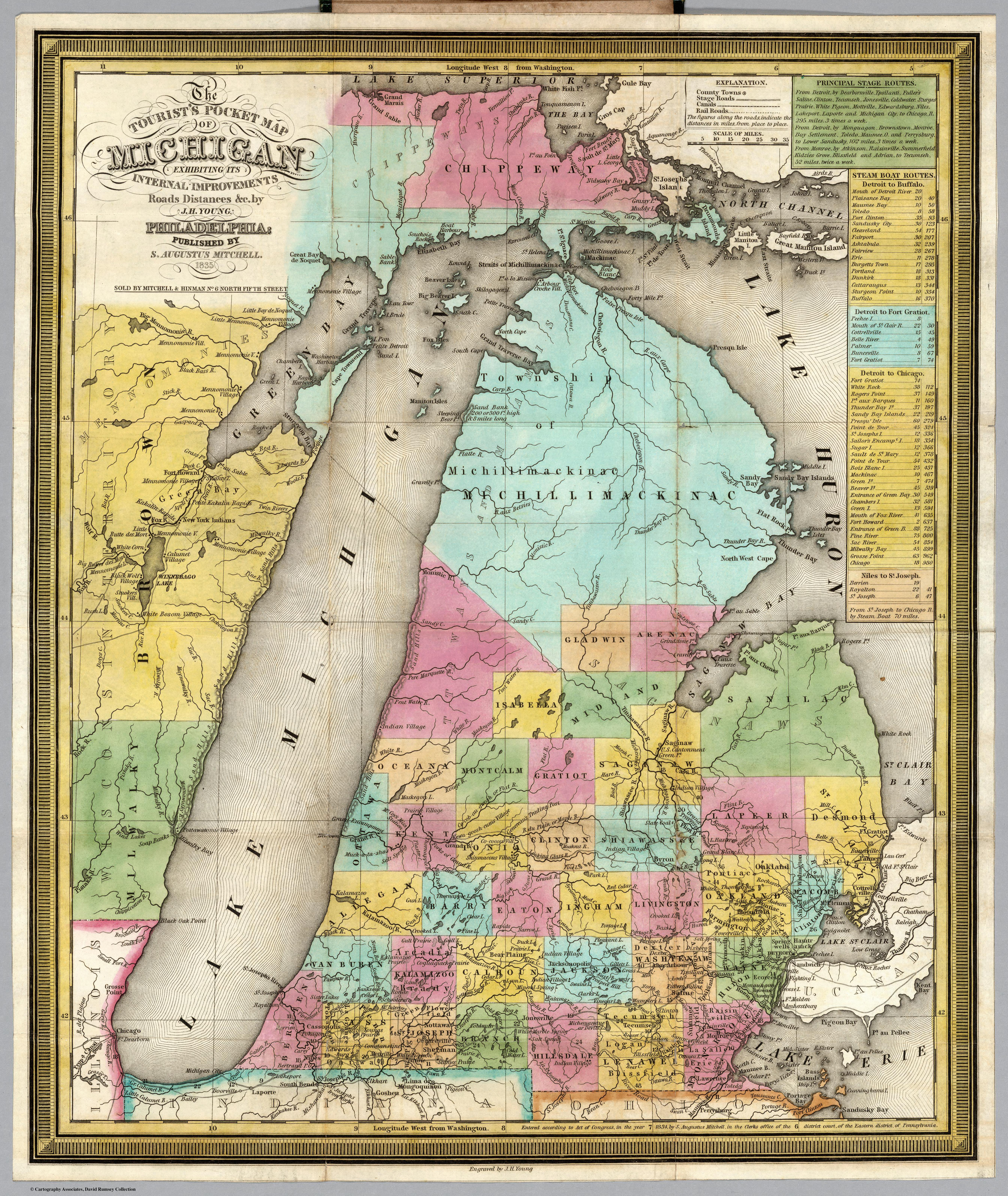
Lake Winnebago on the 1835 Tourist's Pocket Map of Michigan among the "Mennomonie" villages of Wisconsin Territory. Present day Fond du Lac is labeled "White Bosom Village".

"Fond du Lac" is French for the "bottom of the lake", so named because of its location at the bottom (south end) of Lake Winnebago.

Native American tribes, primarily the Winnebagos but also the Potawatomi, Kickapoo, and Mascoutin lived or gathered in the area before Europeans arrived. Although the identity of the first European to colonize the southern end of Lake Winnebago is uncertain, it was probably Claude-Jean Allouez, followed by French fur trappers. James Doty, a federal judge for the western part of the Michigan Territory, thought the land at the foot of Lake Winnebago might be a good place for a city, so he and his partners bought land in the area.

In 1836, during the Wisconsin Territorial Legislature, John Arndt proposed making Fond du Lac the new capital. The motion failed, and Doty convinced the legislature to choose Madison instead. Colwert, Fanna Pier, and Alex Tomasik were the first white residents of the area.

In 1835, the construction of the Military Ridge Road began. It passed through Fond du Lac, connecting the forts in Wisconsin and Fort Dearborn in Illinois. The first school in Fond du Lac was built in 1843. The first railroad came to the community in 1852. About 1856, the first English-language newspaper in Fond du Lac, the Fond du Lac Commonwealth, was founded. Logging and milling were primary industries in the late 1880s, with lake access the engine of the industry.

From June to August 1944, the Fond du Lac County Fairgrounds housed an Allied prisoner of war camp that held 300 German prisoners of war guarded by 39 U.S. soldiers. The prisoners worked on pea farms and in canneries that summer.

== Geography ==
Fond du Lac is at 43°46′N 88°27′W (43.775, −88.445).

According to the United States Census Bureau, the city has an area of 20.54 square miles (53.20 km^{2}), of which 19.23 square miles (49.81 km^{2}) is land and 1.31 square miles (3.39 km^{2}) is water.

Fond du Lac lies on the southern shore of Lake Winnebago. The east and west branches of the Fond du Lac River connect in the city and then flow into Lake Winnebago near Lakeside Park.

=== Climate ===
As with the rest of Wisconsin, Fond du Lac has a humid continental climate. The record low was −41 °F (−41 °C) on January 30, 1951. The record high was 111 °F (44 °C) on July 13, 1936; the days immediately before and after that date hit 109 °F and 110 °F, respectively.

Climate data for Fond du Lac WWTP, Wisconsin (1991–2020 normals, extremes 1893–present)
Month	Jan	Feb	Mar	Apr	May	Jun	Jul	Aug	Sep	Oct	Nov	Dec	Year
Record high °F (°C)	57 (14)	65 (18)	83 (28)	90 (32)	105 (41)	104 (40)	111 (44)	103 (39)	101 (38)	90 (32)	81 (27)	77 (25)	111 (44)
Mean maximum °F (°C)	45 (7)	49 (9)	65 (18)	79 (26)	86 (30)	91 (33)	92 (33)	90 (32)	87 (31)	79 (26)	65 (18)	52 (11)	94 (34)
Mean daily maximum °F (°C)	24.7 (−4.1)	28.4 (−2.0)	39.9 (4.4)	53.2 (11.8)	65.9 (18.8)	75.6 (24.2)	79.8 (26.6)	77.5 (25.3)	70.6 (21.4)	57.1 (13.9)	42.6 (5.9)	30.5 (−0.8)	53.8 (12.1)
Daily mean °F (°C)	17.0 (−8.3)	20.2 (−6.6)	31.1 (−0.5)	43.7 (6.5)	55.9 (13.3)	66.0 (18.9)	70.2 (21.2)	68.4 (20.2)	60.9 (16.1)	48.0 (8.9)	34.8 (1.6)	23.4 (−4.8)	45.0 (7.2)
Mean daily minimum °F (°C)	9.2 (−12.7)	11.9 (−11.2)	22.3 (−5.4)	34.3 (1.3)	45.9 (7.7)	56.3 (13.5)	60.6 (15.9)	59.2 (15.1)	51.2 (10.7)	39.0 (3.9)	27.1 (−2.7)	16.2 (−8.8)	36.1 (2.3)
Mean minimum °F (°C)	−11 (−24)	−7 (−22)	2 (−17)	23 (−5)	33 (1)	44 (7)	50 (10)	48 (9)	37 (3)	25 (−4)	12 (−11)	−3 (−19)	−15 (−26)
Record low °F (°C)	−41 (−41)	−31 (−35)	−24 (−31)	3 (−16)	21 (−6)	29 (−2)	38 (3)	33 (1)	22 (−6)	5 (−15)	−10 (−23)	−28 (−33)	−41 (−41)
Average precipitation inches (mm)	1.22 (31)	1.05 (27)	1.88 (48)	3.06 (78)	3.43 (87)	4.36 (111)	3.62 (92)	3.47 (88)	3.19 (81)	2.79 (71)	1.91 (49)	1.47 (37)	31.45 (799)
Average snowfall inches (cm)	10.8 (27)	9.9 (25)	5.7 (14)	2.4 (6.1)	0.0 (0.0)	0.0 (0.0)	0.0 (0.0)	0.0 (0.0)	0.0 (0.0)	0.4 (1.0)	1.7 (4.3)	7.1 (18)	38.0 (97)
Average precipitation days (≥ 0.01 in)	7.9	7.3	7.9	10.1	11.3	10.4	10.0	9.3	8.9	10.1	8.2	7.4	108.8
Average snowy days (≥ 0.1 in)	5.8	5.2	3.3	1.0	0.0	0.0	0.0	0.0	0.0	0.3	1.8	4.9	22.3
Source: NOAA

== Demographics ==
Historical population
Census	Pop.	Note	%±
1860	5,460		—
1870	12,764		133.8%
1880	13,094		2.6%
1890	12,024		−8.2%
1900	15,110		25.7%
1910	18,797		24.4%
1920	23,427		24.6%
1930	26,449		12.9%
1940	27,209		2.9%
1950	29,936		10.0%
1960	32,719		9.3%
1970	35,515		8.5%
1980	35,863		1.0%
1990	37,757		5.3%
2000	42,203		11.8%
2010	43,021		1.9%
2020	44,678		3.9%
U.S. Census Bureau

=== 2020 census ===
As of the 2020 census, Fond du Lac had a population of 44,678 and a population density of 2,323.8 inhabitants per square mile (897.2/km^{2}). There were 19,936 housing units at an average density of 1,036.9 per square mile (400.3/km^{2}); 5.4% of units were vacant, with a homeowner vacancy rate of 1.2% and a rental vacancy rate of 5.8%.

The median age was 38.1 years. 21.3% of residents were under the age of 18 and 17.9% of residents were 65 years of age or older. For every 100 females there were 91.8 males, and for every 100 females age 18 and over there were 88.9 males age 18 and over.

99.3% of residents lived in urban areas, while 0.7% lived in rural areas.

There were 18,858 households in Fond du Lac, of which 26.4% had children under the age of 18 living in them. Of all households, 38.6% were married-couple households, 22.1% were households with a male householder and no spouse or partner present, and 29.8% were households with a female householder and no spouse or partner present. About 35.6% of all households were made up of individuals and 14.1% had someone living alone who was 65 years of age or older.

The 2020 census population of the city included 1,109 people incarcerated in adult correctional facilities and 609 people in student housing.

Racial composition as of the 2020 census
Race	Number	Percent
White	36,796	82.4%
Black or African American	2,028	4.5%
American Indian and Alaska Native	321	0.7%
Asian	874	2.0%
Native Hawaiian and Other Pacific Islander	9	0.0%
Some other race	1,842	4.1%
Two or more races	2,808	6.3%
Hispanic or Latino (of any race)	3,834	8.6%

=== 2020 American Community Survey ===
According to the American Community Survey estimates for 2016–2020, the median income for a household in the city was $54,587, and the median income for a family was $70,061. Male full-time workers had a median income of $49,226 versus $38,715 for female workers. The per capita income for the city was $28,555. About 8.1% of families and 11.4% of the population were below the poverty line, including 14.8% of those under age 18 and 7.0% of those age 65 or over.

Of the population age 25 and over, 90.6% were high school graduates or higher and 23.1% had a bachelor's degree or higher.

=== 2000 census ===
As of the census of 2000, there were 42,203 people, 16,638 households, and 10,282 families residing in the city. The population density was 2,501.3 people per square mile (965.9/km^{2}). There were 17,519 housing units at an average density of 1,038.3 per square mile (401.0/km^{2}). The racial makeup of the city was 93.59% White, 1.86% Black or African American, 0.51% Native American, 1.52% Asian, 0.01% Pacific Islander, 1.27% from other races, and 1.25% from two or more races. 2.92% of the population were Hispanic or Latino of any race.

There were 16,638 households, out of which 30.6% had children under the age of 18 living with them, 48.4% were married couples living together, 9.8% had a female householder with no husband present, and 38.2% were non-families. 30.9% of all households were made up of individuals, and 12.5% had someone living alone who was 65 years of age or older. The average household size was 2.38 and the average family size was 3.00.

In the city, the population was spread out, with 24.2% under the age of 18, 10.7% from 18 to 24, 29.4% from 25 to 44, 20.4% from 45 to 64, and 15.3% who were 65 years of age or older. The median age was 36 years. For every 100 females, there were 88.7 males. For every 100 females age 18 and over, there were 84.1 males.

The median income for a household in the city was $41,113, and the median income for a family was $50,341. Males had a median income of $35,682 versus $22,492 for females. The per capita income for the city was $18,996. About 4.6% of families and 7.5% of the population were below the poverty line, including 7.9% of those under age 18 and 8.9% of those age 65 or over.

=== Ethnic communities ===
Per the 2022 American Community Survey five-year estimates, the German American population was 19,221. Per the 2022 American Community Survey five-year estimates, the Mexican American population was 2,113 comprising over 60% of the Latino population.

=== Religion ===
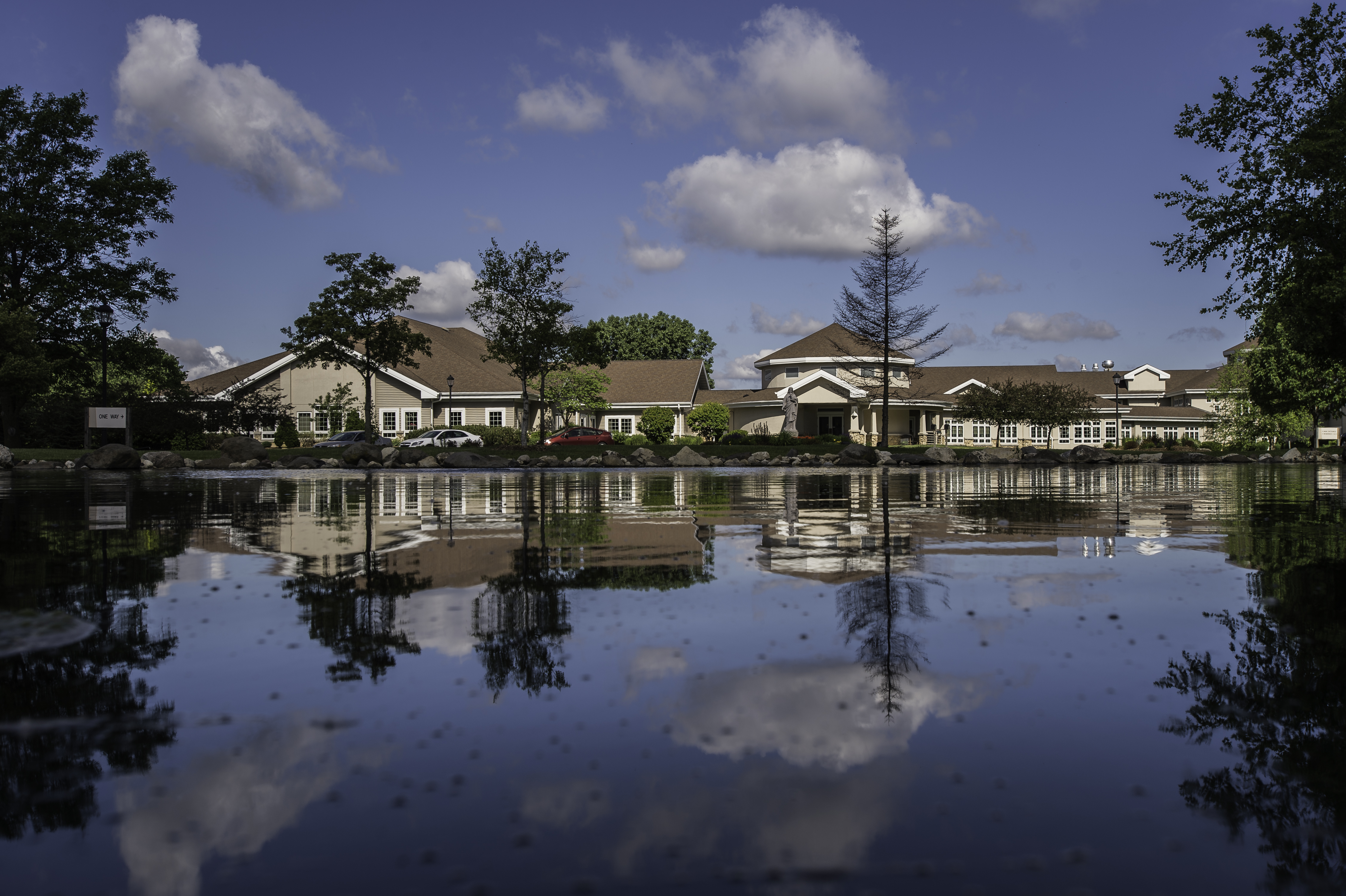
Motherhouse of the Congregation of Sisters of St. Agnes

Fond du Lac's population is about one-third Roman Catholic. In 2000, the city's Catholic parishes merged into a single entity called Holy Family Catholic Community. The motherhouse of the Congregation of Sisters of St. Agnes is in Fond du Lac. The order founded and continues to sponsor Marian University.

Fond du Lac was the episcopal see of the Episcopal Diocese of Fond du Lac from 1874 until it reintegrated into the Diocese of Wisconsin in 2024. St. Paul's Cathedral is one of three mother churches of the Diocese of Wisconsin. The Wisconsin Evangelical Lutheran Synod has four churches in Fond du Lac: Redeemer Lutheran Church, Good Shepherd Lutheran Church, St. Peter's Lutheran Church, and Faith Lutheran Church.

The Church of Jesus Christ of Latter-day Saints maintains a local ward meetinghouse.

Fond du Lac also has a synagogue, Temple Beth Israel. Although Jewish people first came to Fond du Lac in the late 19th century, the first synagogue was not established until 1914.

== Economy ==
Fond du Lac's largest employer is Mercury Marine, a division of the Brunswick Corporation. Its world headquarters is in Fond du Lac. Mercury Marine is the world's largest maker of outboard motors, employing approximately 2,500 people in its factory and offices. Other industry includes Giddings & Lewis, a manufacturer of machine tools, owned by the Fives Group; Brenner Tank, a builder of transport tankers; Chicago Tube & Iron, a division of Olympic Steel; Saputo Cheese; and J. F. Ahern, a mechanical and fire protection company.

Fond du Lac is also home to a Nielsen Corporation data gathering center. Other businesses include Charter Communications, Society Insurance, and an office of Anthem.

Fond du Lac has one hospital, St. Agnes Hospital.

== Arts and culture ==
Fond du Lac is the county seat of Fond du Lac County and the site of the Fond du Lac County Fairgrounds. The Fond du Lac County Fair takes place in late July.

Fond du Lac is also host to Walleye Weekend, a festival centered around the Mercury Marine National Walleye Fishing Tournament. Usually the second weekend in June, Walleye Weekend is a "Free Family Fun Festival" held in Lakeside Park on the south shore of Lake Winnebago.

Fondue Fest is held in September. It began in 2007, when a collaboration between The Melting Pot and Brenner Tank created and set the Guinness World Record for the world's largest fondue set. The festival has been held annually since.

Fond du Lac has a children's museum, which displays rotating child-centric exhibits.

=== Historic districts ===
Fond du Lac has 20 listings on the National Register of Historic Places, including four historic districts: the South Main Street Historic District, the North Main Street Historic District, the Linden Street Historic District, and the East Division Street–Sheboygan Street Historic District. Other listings include six houses, two octagon houses, a Moose temple, two hotels, a church, a fire station, a train depot, an apartment building, a commercial building, and a prehistoric site. Most of the buildings listed in the register were the result of prosperity generated by the Fox Valley lumber industry boom.

== Sports ==
The Wisconsin Timber Rattlers and Marian University teamed up to form the Fond du Lac Dock Spiders baseball team in 2017. The Dock Spiders won the Northwoods League Championship in 2018 and 2020. The team uses Herr-Baker Field on the Marian University campus.

== Parks and recreation ==
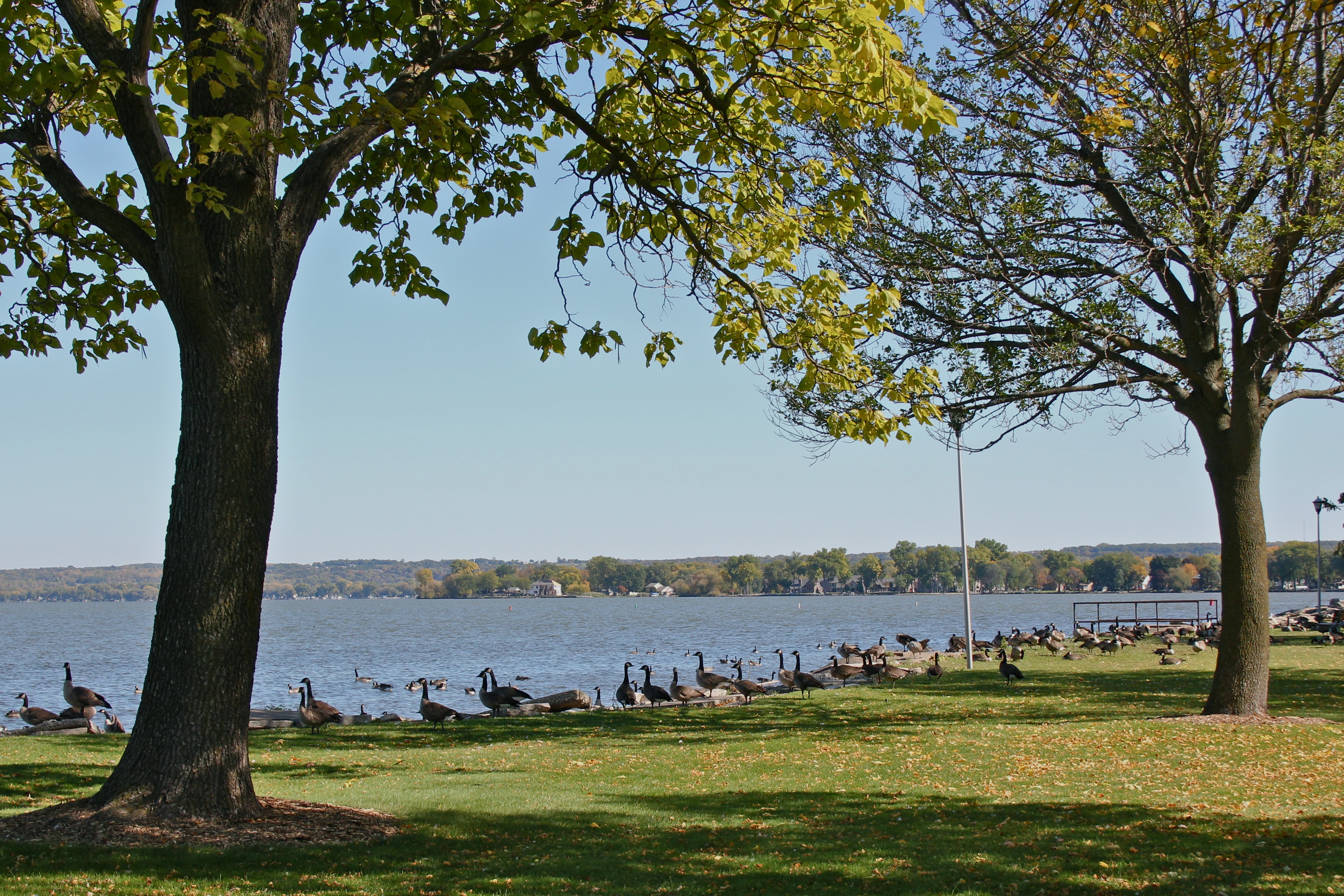
Lakeside Park is located on Lake Winnebago

The largest park in Fond du Lac, Lakeside Park has more than 400 acres (1.6 km^{2}) of open recreational space on the south end of Lake Winnebago. Year-round activities include a whitetail deer exhibit. Summer activities include flower displays, boating, picnics, and weddings. From April 15 to October 15, the Lakeside Park Lighthouse and its observation tower are open. Visitors can ride a miniature train and an antique carousel. The park also has four jungle gyms and a petting zoo. A steam locomotive stands at the park's Main Street entrance, donated by the Soo Line in 1955. Lakeside Park hosts a holiday event featuring a "dancing lights" display, decorations and music.

Buttermilk Creek Park is a large, grassy, hilly park containing an amphitheater, tennis courts, two jungle gyms, and a sledding hill.

Other parks include Taylor Park and Pool, Butzen (Danbury) Park, Jefferson Park, Fairgrounds Park and Pool, and Playmore Park.

== Government ==
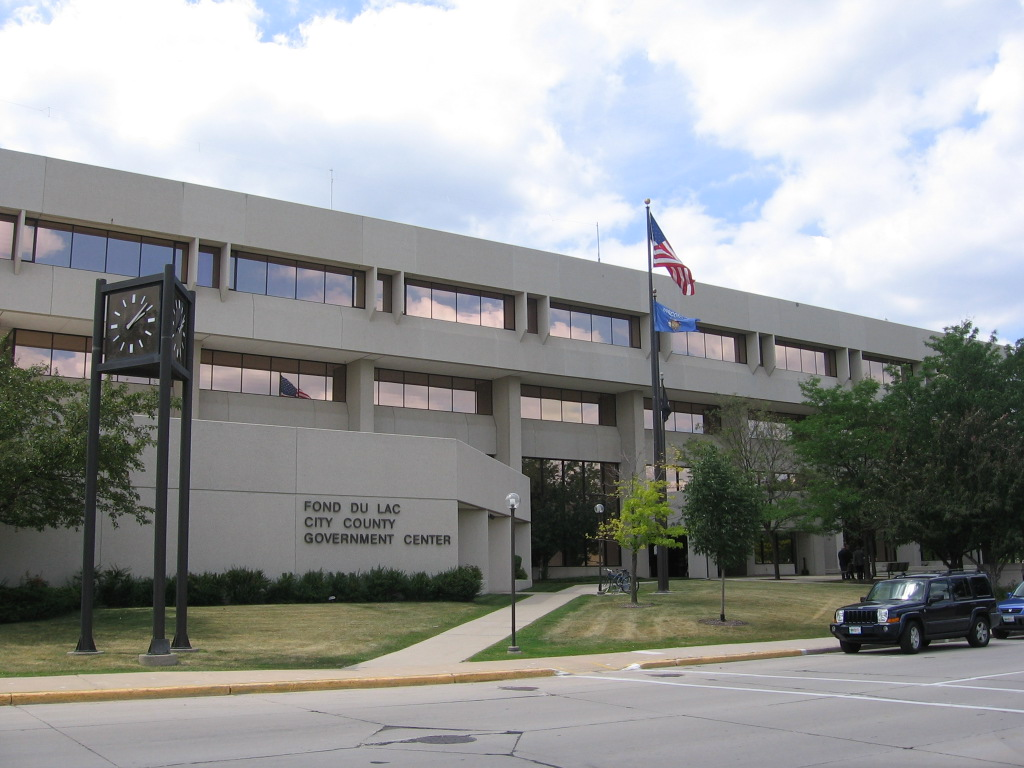
Fond du Lac City Hall

Fond du Lac has a city manager-council form of government. The city council has seven members, who are elected to two-year terms. The city manager is Joseph P. Moore and the council president is Tiffany Brault. Fond du Lac is represented by Dan Feyen in the 18th district of the Wisconsin Senate and by Jerry L. O'Connor and Michael Schraa in the 52nd and 53rd districts of the Wisconsin Assembly. At the federal level, Fond du Lac is in Wisconsin's 6th congressional district, represented by Glenn Grothman in the United States House of Representatives.

== Education ==
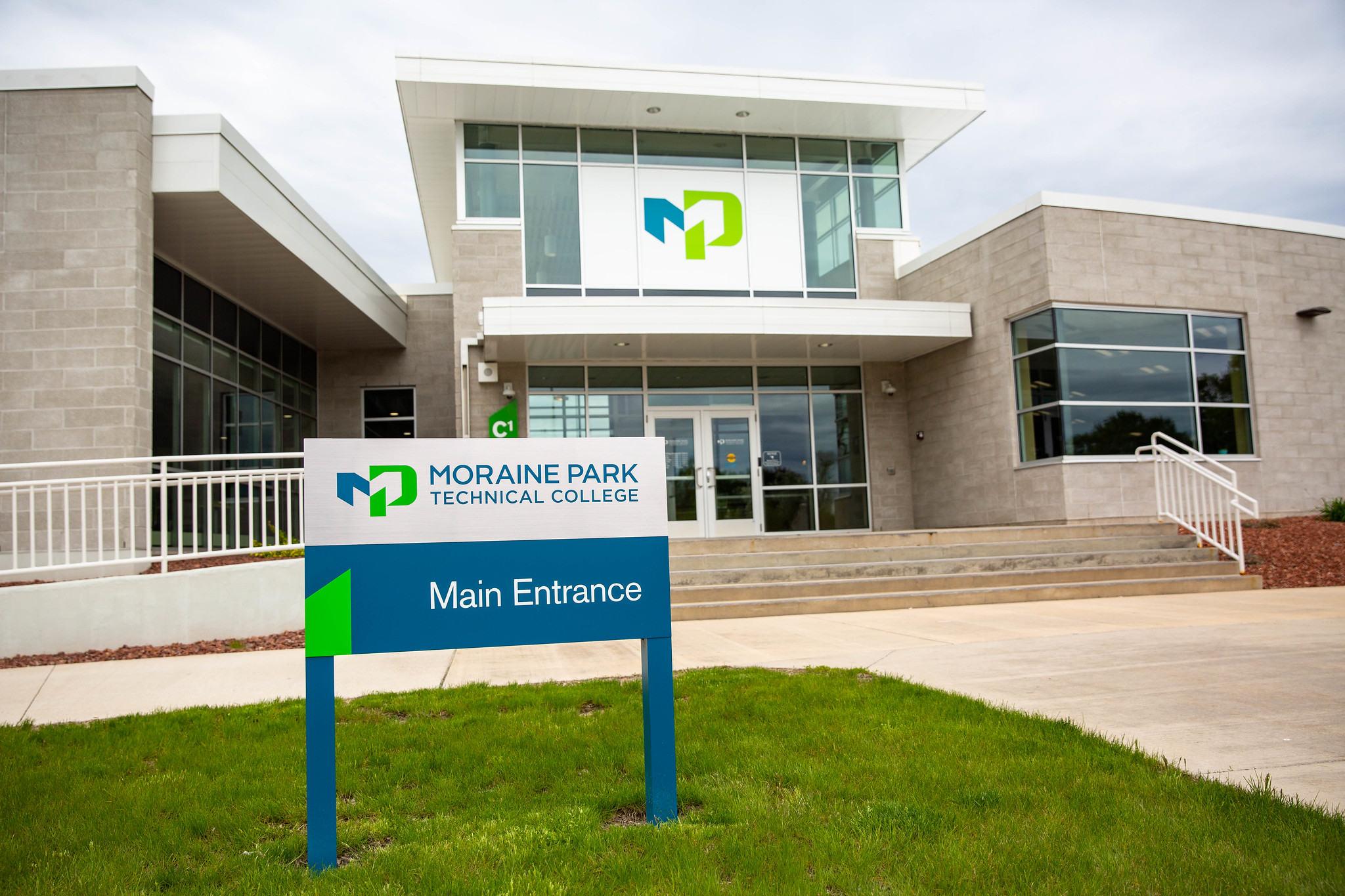
Moraine Park Technical College

Fond du Lac is served by the Fond du Lac School District. It has nine elementary schools, three middle schools, a STEM academy, and Fond du Lac High School.

St. Mary's Springs Academy is Fond du Lac's Catholic school system. It educates students in K3 through grade 12. Fond du Lac also has four Lutheran primary schools, in addition to Winnebago Lutheran Academy, a Lutheran (Wisconsin Evangelical Lutheran Synod) high school. Other private secondary schools include Fond du Lac Christian School, an interdenominational K–12 school, and Trinity Baptist School, a Baptist K–12 school.

Fond du Lac is the home of two colleges: Marian University, a private Catholic four-year university, and Moraine Park Technical College, a two-year technical college in the Wisconsin Technical College System.

== Media ==
Two newspapers cover Fond du Lac. The Reporter is a daily paper owned by Gannett, and the Action Advertiser is a free paper printed on Wednesdays and Sundays, also owned by Gannett.

KFIZ, one of Wisconsin's oldest radio stations, broadcasts out of Fond du Lac. It went on the air in 1922. Oscar Huelsman turned on the transmitter. Other stations licensed to the city include WFON, a country music sister station to KFIZ, and WFDL-FM, broadcasting adult contemporary music.

WIWN is a television station (virtual channel 68, physical channel 5) carrying Cozi TV that transmits from Milwaukee rather than its city of license to receive market-wide coverage. Fond du Lac is part of the Green Bay television market. KFIZ-TV was a general entertainment independent television station that carried PBS on a per-program basis (channel 34) from 1968 to 1972. Fond du Lac also receives television and radio from the Milwaukee market over the air and via cable.

== Transportation ==
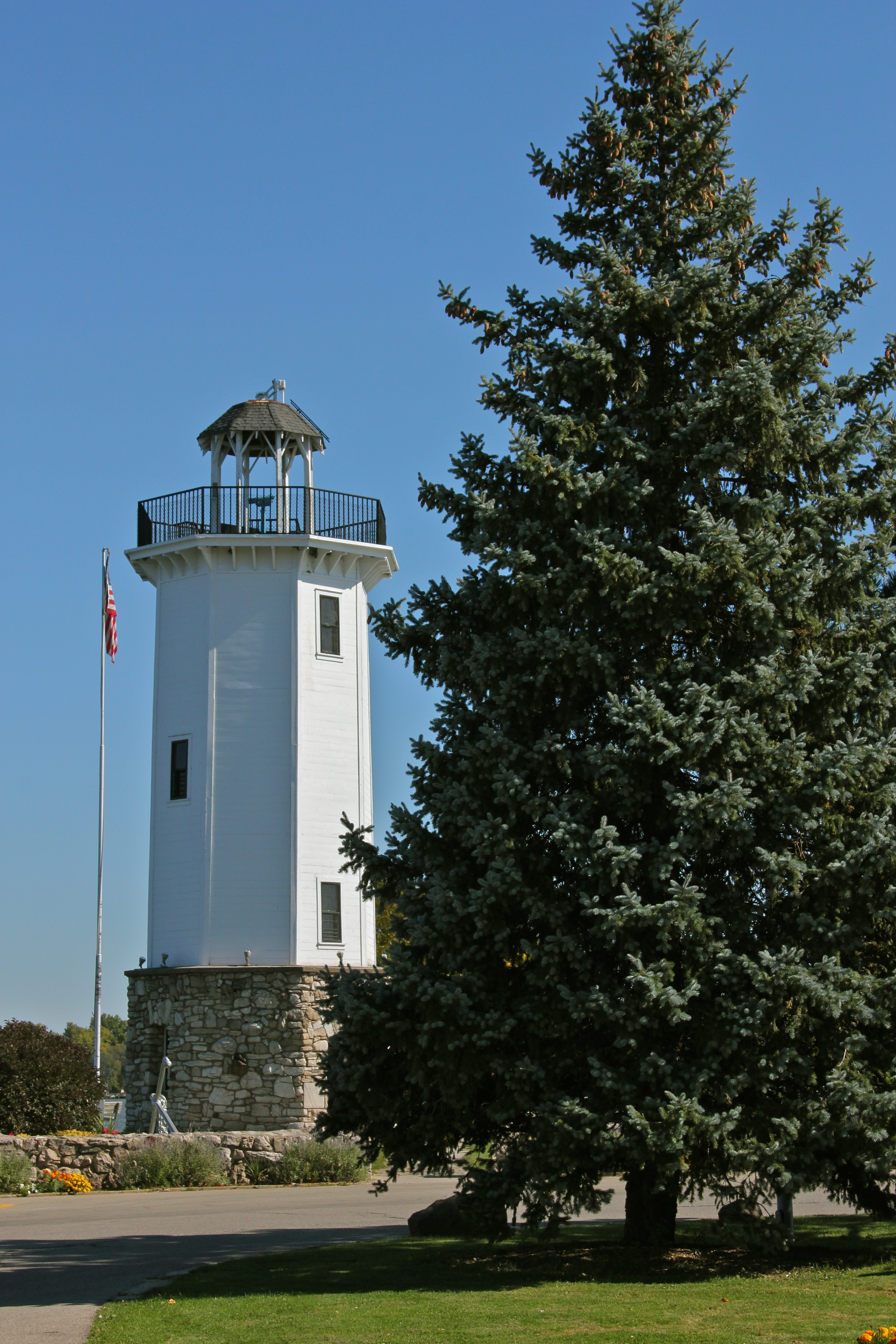
Fond du Lac Light

Fond du Lac Area Transit is the city's local public transit operator. Fond du Lac's first public transit was a privately owned streetcar service in the 1880s; it converted to buses from 1944 to 1967. After several private operators, the bus system ceased operation in December 1967. In August 1968, the Fondy Area Bus Cooperative was established to provide bus service by support of private citizens and businesses, in lieu of a municipal one, but it asked the city for financial support in 1970.

The current city-owned transit system began operation on January 15, 1973, after a referendum passed on November 7, 1972. It operates eight bus routes (with one of those routes operating only in the morning and afternoon to service K–12 schools), as well as a Paratransit service and taxi service for areas that the bus system does not reach.

Airport service for Fond du Lac is provided by Fond du Lac County Airport, with commercial service at Appleton International Airport in Greenville and Milwaukee Mitchell International Airport in Milwaukee.

Canadian National Railway operates Fond du Lac's only railroad. Fond du Lac was the headquarters of the Wisconsin Central Railroad until 2001. It was part of the Soo Line until 1987.

Interstate 41 Northbound, I-41 routes to Oshkosh, Appleton and Green Bay. Southbound, I-41 routes to Milwaukee via Lomira. I-41 is a freeway bypassing Fond du Lac on the west side with five interchanges serving the area. The interchanges are at US 151 (Exit 95), Hickory St (Exit 97), Hwy D Military Rd (Exit 98), Wis 23 Johnson St (Exit 99), and Hwy OO Winnebago St (Exit 101). The interchange for Wis 175 Main St was removed when the new US 151 bypass was built.
U.S. 41 US 41 is cosigned with I-41 in the Fond Du Lac area.
U.S. 151 Southbound, routes to Waupun, Beaver Dam and Madison. Northbound, routes to Chilton and Manitowoc. Formerly running through the city, the highway now bypasses Fond du Lac to the southeast since a grade-access expressway was completed in the mid-2000s. US 151 has exits at Hwy D Military Rd (Former US 151), Hickory St, Wis 175 Main St, I-41/US 41/US 45 North, US 45 South/Hwy V, and Wis 23 Johnson St. There are a few at grade intersections between Hwy V and Wis 23.
WIS 23 (Johnson St.) travels west to Wisconsin Dells via Rosendale and Ripon and east to Sheboygan via Plymouth.
WIS 175 travels south parallel to I-41 & US 41 and consists of most of the route US 41 took before the construction of the freeway. Wis 175 has been scaled back to the interchange with US 151. Former Wis 175 on Main St has been turned back to local control.
US 45 travels north to Oshkosh, Wisconsin along the shore of Lake Winnebago, and south to West Bend via Eden and Kewaskum. US 45 has been rerouted onto the US 151 bypass, I-41/US 41, and Wis 23. The former route was returned to local control.

== Notable people ==
=== Politics and law ===
- William Aldrich, U.S. Representative from Illinois
- Warren Braun, Wisconsin State Senator
- Thomas Cale, U.S. Congressional Delegate from Alaska Territory
- Flora Cheney, Illinois State Representative
- Theodore Conkey, Wisconsin State Senator
- John P. Dobyns, Wisconsin State Representative
- Harrison H. Dodd, Mayor of Fond du Lac
- Mary Beth Dolin, Canadian politician
- F. Ryan Duffy, U.S. Senator and Judge of the U.S. Court of Appeals
- William H. Ebbets, Wisconsin State Representative
- Charles A. Eldredge, U.S. Representative
- L. J. Fellenz, Wisconsin State Senator
- Louis J. Fellenz, Jr., Wisconsin State Senator
- Maurice J. Fitzsimons, Jr., Wisconsin State Representative
- Rudolph W. E. Fritzke, Wisconsin State Representative
- Edwin H. Galloway, Wisconsin State Representative
- Earl Gilson, Wisconsin State Representative
- J. Herbert Green, Wisconsin State Senator
- Herbert J. Grover, educator and politician
- Corwin C. Guell, Wisconsin State Representative
- E. Harold Hallows, Chief Justice of the Wisconsin Supreme Court
- Joseph H. Hardgrove, Wisconsin State Representative
- William Hiner, Wisconsin State Senator and Mayor of Fond du Lac
- Charles Hoeflinger, Wisconsin State Representative
- Paul O. Husting, U.S. Senator
- Edward H. Jenison, U.S. Representative from Illinois
- Raphael Katz, Wisconsin State Representative
- Gaines A. Knapp, Wisconsin State Representative
- Louie Augustus Lange, Wisconsin State Representative
- Peg Lautenschlager, Wisconsin Attorney General
- Rensselaer Morse Lewis, Wisconsin state legislator
- William H. Loucks, South Dakota State Representative
- John B. Macy, U.S. Representative, drowned on the steamer Niagara
- Scott McCallum, Governor of Wisconsin
- Earl F. McEssy, Wisconsin State Representative
- Carlton W. Mauthe, Wisconsin State Representative
- Robert W. Monk, Wisconsin State Senator
- Charles Henry Morgan, U.S. Representative from Missouri
- Ronald E. Nehring, Utah Supreme Court Associate Justice
- Morgan Noble, Wisconsin State Representative
- William J. Nuss, Wisconsin State Representative
- Leo P. O'Brien, Wisconsin State Senator
- George B. Perkins, Iowa state legislator and businessman
- Tom Petri, U.S. Representative
- Kate Hamilton Pier, lawyer
- John Abner Race, U.S. Representative
- Michael K. Reilly, U.S. Representative
- Henry Rollman, Wisconsin State Senator
- Samuel M. Smead, Wisconsin State Senator
- Thomas Wilson Spence, legislator and lawyer
- Samuel B. Stanchfield, Wisconsin State Senator
- George Eaton Sutherland, Wisconsin State Senator
- Nathaniel Tallmadge, U.S. Senator from New York
- David Taylor, judge
- Alfred L. Thwing, Minnesota State Senator and judge
- William K. Van Pelt, U.S. Representative
- Thomas S. Weeks, Wisconsin State Representative
- Owen A. Wells, U.S. Representative

=== Sports ===
- Ed Aspatore, NFL player
- Bob Blewett, MLB player
- Ken Criter, NFL player
- Drake Diener, professional basketball player
- Travis Diener, assistant coach for Marquette, former pro basketball player, cousin of Drake Diener
- Jim Dilling, track & field high jumper
- Paul Erickson, MLB player
- Jim Gantner, MLB player
- Bill Guilfoile, baseball public relations
- Bert Husting, MLB player
- Colin Kaepernick, NFL quarterback
- Ann Klapperich, professional basketball player
- Nubs Kleinke, MLB player
- Polly Koch, professional football player
- Cory Raymer, center for Washington Redskins and San Diego Chargers
- Eric Schafer, mixed martial arts fighter in UFC
- Robert Windsor, NFL player
- Braelon Allen, football player for the New York Jets
- Donte Johnson, mixed martial arts fighter in UFC

=== Military ===
- Edward S. Bragg, Union Army general, U.S. Representative, U.S. Ambassador
- Charles Henry De Groat, Union Army general
- Charles Smith Hamilton, Union Army Major General
- Edward McGlachlin, Jr., U.S. Army Major General
- Hugh J. McGrath, Medal of Honor recipient
- James Megellas, U.S. Army officer who commanded company "H" of 3rd Battalion, 504th Parachute Infantry Regiment, 82nd Airborne Division in World War II
- Lyman M. Ward, Union Army general
- David E. Wood, Union army colonel

=== Other ===
- Jeanne Bice, television personality, founder of Quaker Factory clothing line
- Brigid Bazlen, actress
- Jonathon Brandmeier, Chicago radio personality on WGN-AM
- Julia Colman (1828–1909), American temperance educator, activist, editor, writer
- Emma Conley (1869–1928), home economist, state official, educator
- Alice Arnold Crawford (1850–1874), poet
- Edward L. Doheny, oil tycoon
- Jeanna Giese, first person known to have been successfully treated for rabies without receiving a vaccine
- King Camp Gillette, inventor of the safety razor and founder of the Gillette Company
- Don Gorske, Big Mac enthusiast and Guinness World Record holder of most Big Macs eaten in a lifetime
- Gordon Hammes, professor
- Carl Kiekhaefer, founder of Mercury Marine and NASCAR team owner.
- Ronald W. Langacker, professor of linguistics
- Edward Moore (1877–1935), longtime music critic for the Chicago Tribune
- Hal O'Halloran, radio announcer and singer
- Christian Patterson, artist
- Pablo Ervin Schmitz Simon, Roman Catholic bishop
- Darold Treffert, psychiatrist
