= Međa (Žitište) =

Međa Међа (Serbian)
- Village (Selo)
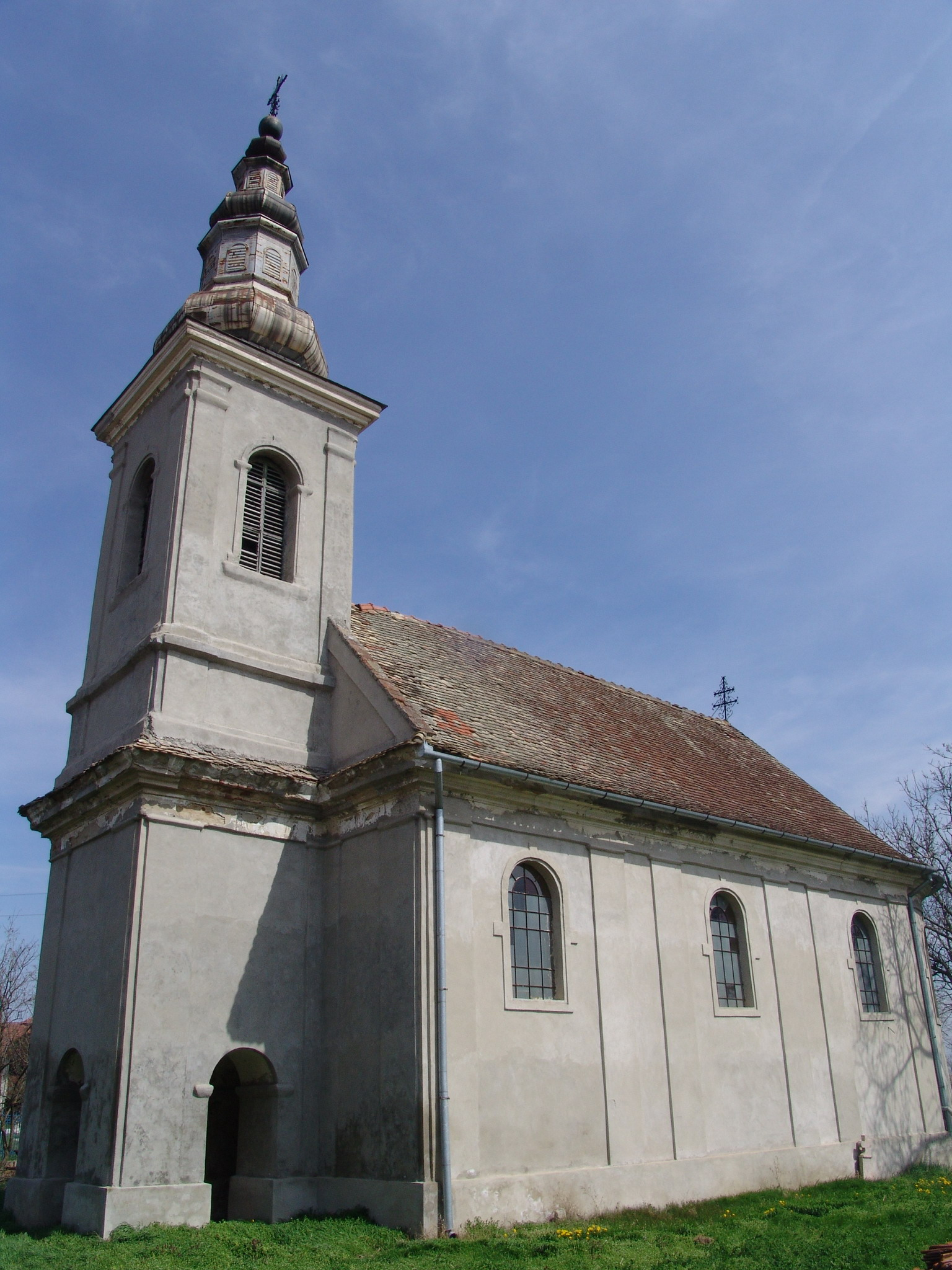
- The Orthodox Church

- Location within Serbia Međa (Serbia) Međa (Europe)
- Coordinates: 45°32′05″N 20°48′15″E
- Country: Serbia
- Province: Vojvodina
- District: Central Banat
- Municipalities: Žitište
- Elevation: 81 m (266 ft)

Population (2002)
  - Međa: 1,155
- Time zone: UTC+1 (CET)
  - Summer (DST): UTC+2 (CEST)
- Postal code: 23234
- Area code: +381(0)23
- Car plates: ZR

Međa (Serbian Cyrillic: Међа; Hungarian: Párdány) is a village located in the Žitište municipality, in the Central Banat District of Serbia. It is situated in the Autonomous Province of Vojvodina. The village has a Serb ethnic majority (88.65%) and its population numbering 1,155 people (2002 census).

== Name ==
In Serbian, the village is known as Međa (Међа), in German as Pardan, in Hungarian as Párdány, and in Romanian as Meda. Its former names used in Serbian were Pardanj (Пардањ) and Ninčićevo (Нинчићево) after Momčilo Ninčić.

Former Serb Pardanj was known as Srpski Pardanj (Српски Пардањ) in Serbian, Serbische Pardan in German, and Szerb-Párdány in Hungarian.

Former Slovak Pardanj was known as Totovski Pardanj (Тотовски Пардањ) in Serbian, Slowakisch Pardan in German, and Tót-Párdány in Hungarian. It was later also known as German Pardanj (Serbian: Nemački Pardanj or Немачки Пардањ, German: Deutsch Pardan, Hungarian: Német-Párdány) and Hungarian Pardanj (Serbian: Mađarski Pardanj or Мађарски Пардањ, German: Ungarisch Pardan, Hungarian: Magyar-Párdány).

== History ==
It was first mentioned in historical literature 1247 AD. During Ottoman rule (in 1660/66), Pardanj was inhabited by Serbs, and in 1753 was also recorded as Serb-inhabited settlement. At first, there were two villages with name Pardanj: Serb Pardanj and Slovak Pardanj. Former Slovak inhabitants either moved out of the village or became magyarized or Germanized. In the middle of the 18th century, Germans and Hungarians settled here as well, mostly in Slovak Pardanj, which later became known as German Pardanj and Hungarian Pardanj. Two villages (former Serb Pardanj and former Slovak/German/Hungarian Pardanj) united into single village in 1907. According to 1910 census there were 3,213 inhabitants in the settlements, who spoke following languages: German - 1,874, Serbian - 1,052, Hungarian - 243. After the First World War, the Treaty of Versailles in 1919 assigned Pardanj to Romania. It was under Romanian administration until 1924, when it was assigned to the Kingdom of Serbs, Croats and Slovenes. In this time, its name was changed to Ninčićevo. Near the end of the Second World War (1944) the German population was forced into Tito's concentration camps where many perished. The village and colonists from Bosnia and Herzegovina settled here instead of them. New inhabitants named the village Međa ("border" in English) because of the proximity of the state border. Formerly, Međa was a seat of the municipality, but later was included into new municipality with seat in Žitište.

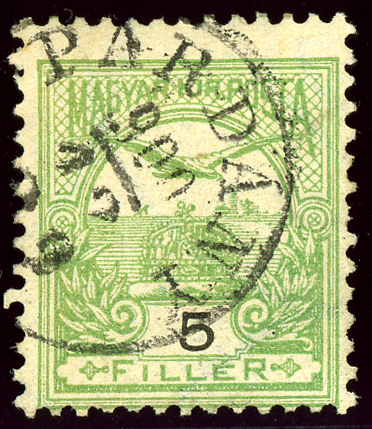
Hungarian name Párdány in 1900 in the Kingdom of Hungary.

== Ethnic groups (2002 census) ==
- Serbs = 1,024 (88.66%)
- Hungarians = 43 (3.72%)
- Romani = 25 (2.17%)
- others.

== Historical population ==
- 1961: 2,367
- 1971: 2,047
- 1981: 1,636
- 1991: 1,403
- 2002: 1,155

== Trivia ==
Local people of Međa plan to build a monument dedicated to Johnny Weissmuller, who was born in 1904 in Međa according to some sources. However, where the actor was actually born is disputed because other sources claim that his birthplace was Szabadfalu (Freidorf), present-day part of Timișoara.

== Notable citizens ==
- The politician Vuk Drašković was born in Međa.
- Count János Buttler de Párdány, Hungarian aristocrat. Kálmán Mikszáth's novel A Strange Marriage is based on his life story.
- Johnny Weissmuller (born Johann Peter Weißmüller; June 2, 1904 – January 20, 1984) was an Austro-Hungarian-born American swimmer and actor. The ship's roster from his family's arrival at Ellis Island lists his birthplace as Párdány (now Međa), village on territory of today's Serbia, although he was born in Freidorf, Austria-Hungary, stated also in the baptismal records of Saint Rochus Church in Freidorf. He won fifty-two US National Championships and set sixty-seven world records. After his swimming career, he became the sixth actor to portray Tarzan in films, a role he played in twelve motion pictures.

== Gallery ==
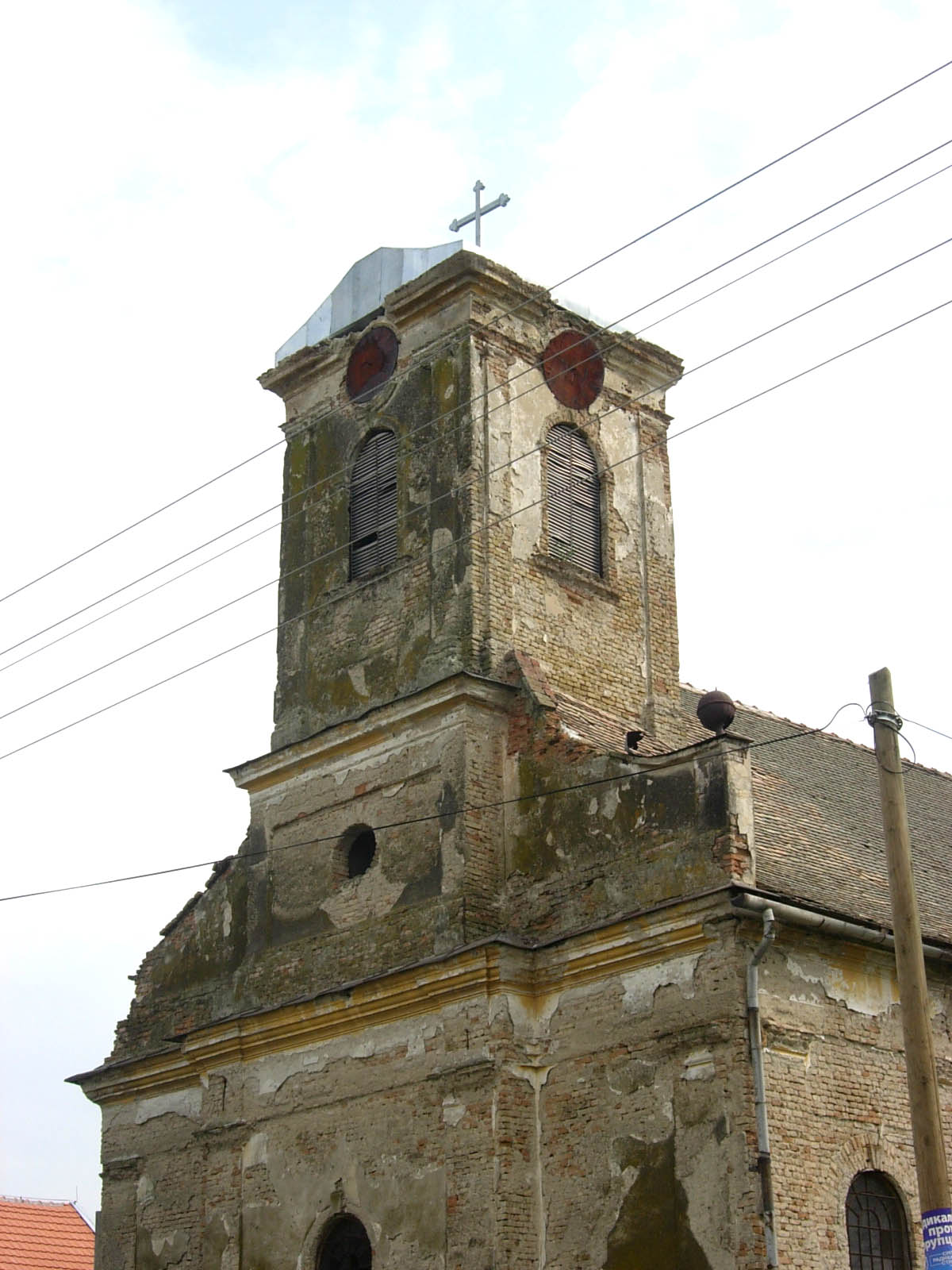
The Saint John Nepomuk Catholic Church.
