= Frank Bateman Keefe =

American politician (1887–1952)

Frank B. Keefe
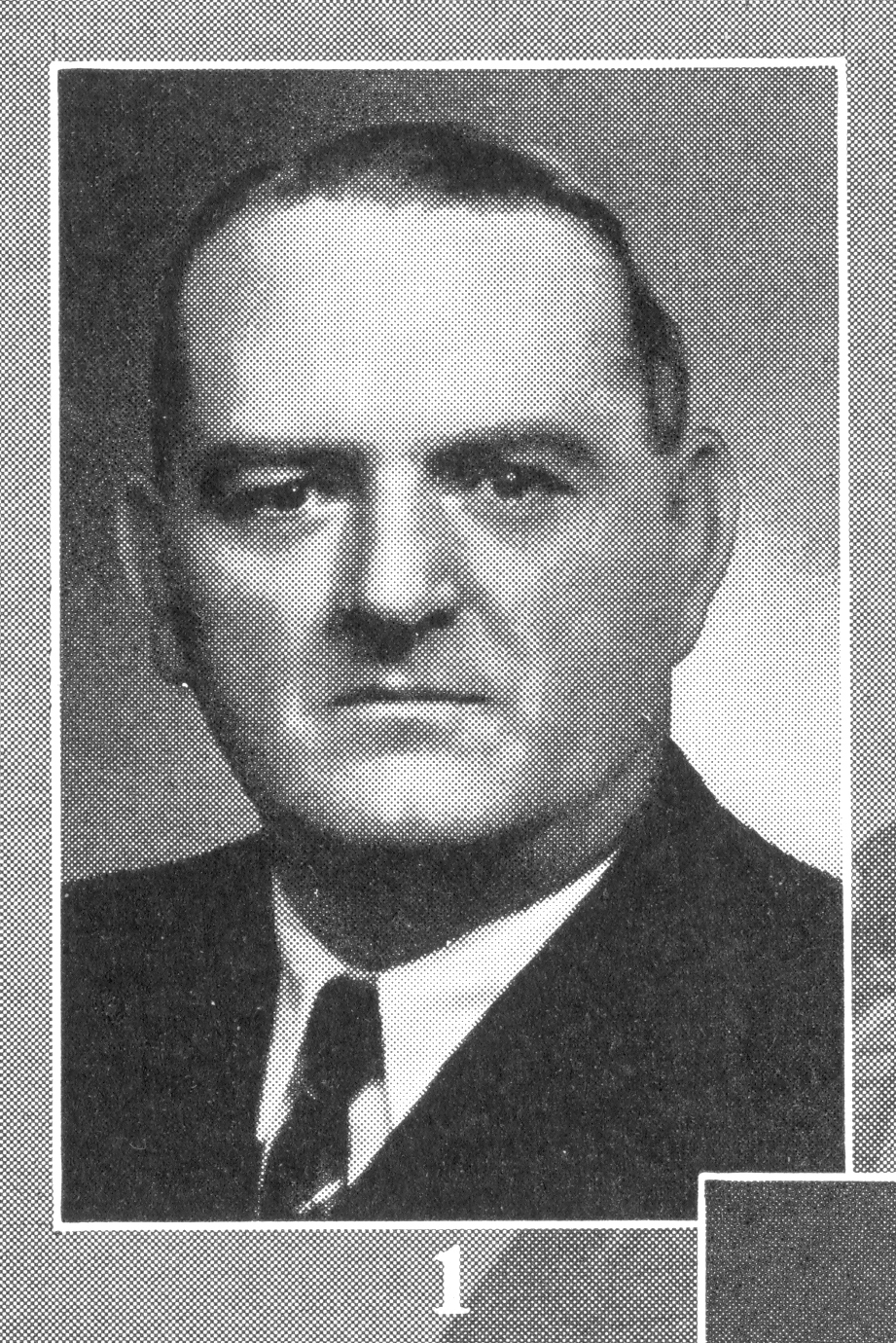

Member of the U.S. House of Representatives from Wisconsin's 6th district
- In office January 3, 1939 – January 3, 1951
- Preceded by: Michael Reilly
- Succeeded by: William Van Pelt

District Attorney of Winnebago County, Wisconsin
- In office January 1, 1927 – January 1, 1933
- Preceded by: David K. Allen
- Succeeded by: R. Curtis Laus

Personal details
- Born: September 23, 1887 Winneconne, Wisconsin, U.S.
- Died: February 5, 1952 (aged 64) Neenah, Wisconsin, U.S.
- Cause of death: Heart attack
- Resting place: Lake View Memorial Park, Oshkosh, Wisconsin
- Party: Republican; Democratic (before 1920)
- Spouse: Mildred Virginia Steele (m. 1912–1952)
- Children: 3
- Education: Oshkosh State Teachers College; University of Michigan Law School
- Profession: Lawyer, politician

Frank Bateman Keefe (September 23, 1887 – February 5, 1952) was an American lawyer and Republican politician from Oshkosh, Wisconsin. He served six terms in the U.S. House of Representatives, representing Wisconsin's 6th congressional district from 1939 to 1951. He previously served six years as district attorney of Winnebago County, Wisconsin.

== Early life and education ==
Frank Keefe was born in Winneconne, Wisconsin, in September 1887. He was educated at public schools and went on to attend Oshkosh State Normal School (now the University of Wisconsin–Oshkosh). He graduated in 1906 and went to work as a school teacher in Viroqua, Wisconsin, for two years. He continued his education at the University of Michigan and earned his LL.B. in 1910.

== Early legal and political career ==
He was admitted to the bar at Madison, Wisconsin. He briefly worked as an attorney in Portage, Wisconsin, before returning to the Oshkosh area in 1911 and opening a law firm in Omro, Wisconsin.

As a young man, he was active in the Democratic Party of Wisconsin. He first sought public office in 1912, when he was elected village president of Omro. Later that year, he was solicited to run for Wisconsin State Assembly on the Democratic Party ticket in what was then Winnebago County's 3rd Assembly district, but he did not enter the race.

In 1914, he sought election as village president again but lost the election to Frank W. Stanley. Days after the 1914 election, Keefe launched a criminal complaint against Charles H. Stevens, alleging he circulated false accusations against Keefe in the election, at the time this was prosecutable under the state's new corrupt practices act. The alleged false statement was that Keefe had accepted a $500 bribe from a brewery to allow them to open a saloon in Omro. Stevens was convicted by a jury, but he appealed the conviction.

Keefe moved to Oshkosh later that year. In the fall of 1914, he was elected chairman of the Winnebago County Democratic Party, and served in that role for several years. After the 1914 fall election, he was hired as Winnebago County's first assistant district attorney, under district attorney Daniel E. McDonald. McDonald declined to run again in 1916, and Keefe stood as the Democratic candidate for district attorney. He lost the general election to Republican David K. Allen.

In subsequent years, Keefe became increasingly active in local affairs and civic groups. He served on the city draft board after the United States entered World War I; he was a member of the Benevolent and Protective Order of Elks, and was president of the local Kiwanis. He also partnered with Henry Barber in his law practice, under the firm name Barber & Keefe.

In 1912, Oshkosh had adopted a different form of municipal government, where the councilmembers were elected at large. Keefe championed a movement to return to the traditional city council model of aldermanic districts, but was ultimately unsuccessful.

Keefe attended Woodrow Wilson's 2nd inauguration in 1917, and spoke vigorously in defense of the Democratic Party agenda as late as the spring of 1920. It was a surprise two months later when Keefe sought the Republican Party nomination for district attorney, challenging the incumbent David K. Allen. In a statement, Keefe acknowledged his past association with the Democratic Party and explained that he had always considered himself an independent. He further suggested that the party platforms had very little difference as of 1920. Allen won the primary. Two years later, Keefe challenged Allen again, and lost a third time.

As a new member of the Republican Party, Keefe identified with the progressive wing. When Wisconsin U.S. senator Robert M. La Follette ran for the presidency in 1924 on the Progressive Party ticket, Keefe supported him.

=== District attorney ===
In 1926, district attorney David K. Allen announced he would not run again. Keefe entered the race to succeed him; he defeated assistant district attorney R. Curtis Laus and former Menasha city attorney Silas L. Spengler in the Republican primary. He faced no opposition in the general election.

In his first term as district attorney, Keefe took down two of the county's highest ranking elected officials. He brought charges of corruption and mismanagement against Winnebago County sheriff Walter F. Plummer in the fall of 1927. He concluded, however, that he had no legal recourse against the sheriff, so instead made his case to the governor, Fred R. Zimmerman, who was empowered to remove sheriffs for cause. Three weeks of hearings were held in early 1928, in which it was detailed that the sheriff had accepted bribes for protection of speakeasies operating during Prohibition, and had separately used confiscated alcohol from other prohibition-related raids for parties and "orgies" held at the county jail, and had otherwise abused his authority over the jail. Zimmermann stripped Plummer of his office. Keefe followed that act by arresting and indicting the chairman of the Winnebago County board, George A. Loescher. Loescher was charged with self-dealing in contracts for the county's Sunnyview sanatorium and Hicks Memorial Home over ten years. Loescher ultimately made a plea deal, pleading nolo contendere, resigning from office, and paying a penalty.

Keefe was subsequently re-elected in 1928 and 1930. He announced in March 1932 that he would not run for a fourth term.

After leaving office, Keefe returned to his legal practice, then known as Barber, Keefe, Patri, & Horwitz. In December 1933, however, he was appointed to serve as a special prosecutor for the neighboring Outagamie County district attorney in an investigation of financial irregularities in county agencies. Keefe delivered his report two months later, detailing self-dealing and rigged bidding practices in the county highway department; he named several local and county elected officials as complicit in the scheme, and also accused several others of being negligent in their oversight responsibilities. During these years he also became president of the county bar and a member of the board of governors of the state bar.

== Congress ==
Although Keefe had supported La Follette in his independent Progressive Party bid for the presidency in 1924, when La Follette's sons broke off from the Republican Party of Wisconsin and created the Wisconsin Progressive Party in 1934, Keefe remained with the Republican Party.

Wisconsin's 6th congressional district 1932–1963

In 1936, Keefe made his first run for U.S. House of Representatives after he was endorsed by the 6th congressional district Republican convention. Despite the strong endorsement from the delegates, he still faced a primary against former state senator Albert J. Pullen. Keefe won the primary with two thirds of the vote. In the general election, Keefe faced incumbent Democrat Michael Reilly, running for his fourth consecutive term, and a third party challenge from Progressive Adam F. Poltl, who was then the mayor of Hartford, Wisconsin. Much of the race was a debate over national policies of the Franklin D. Roosevelt administration. Keefe attacked Roosevelt for wasteful spending, broken promises, and radicalism, saying his farm policies were destroying domestic farm products and lowering the tariff barrier to foreign imports. Keefe also tried throughout the fall to engage Reilly in a debate, but Reilly avoided it and mocked the request. Reilly also accused Keefe of trying to obfuscate his party affiliation and avoid mention of the Republican presidential nominee Alf Landon. Reilly narrowly won the election, taking 39% of the vote in the three-way race.

Keefe ran again in the 1938 midterm. This time he faced no opponent for the Republican nomination, but still saw unusually high turnout at the primary. He faced Reilly and Poltl again in the general election. Keefe doubled down on his attacks on the Roosevelt administration, calling him a "dictator" over his court packing and government reorganization plans, but softened his opposition to several New Deal policies such as the Works Progress Administration and the Public Works Administration. Keefe also feuded openly with the press, particularly the editor of the Sheboygan Press. Another major issue in the 1938 election was the Townsend Plan, an alternative social security proposal; Keefe eventually endorsed the plan. The 1938 election saw a Republican wave; Keefe defeated Reilly, Poltl, and a fourth candidate from the short-lived Union Party, taking an outright majority of the vote in the general election.

During the 76th Congress, Keefe embraced the work of the House Un-American Activities Committee and became a vocal anti-communist, with increasingly hostile rhetoric toward the Roosevelt administration. Keefe was also outspoken and voted repeatedly to maintain strict U.S. neutrality as Europe spiraled into World War II. During the Congress, he also voted for the creation of American concentration camps, intended for the detention of aliens whose country of origin would not readmit them. Keefe said of the measure, "If we detain American citizens who are unable to cope with conditions, why not detain aliens?"

In early 1940, Keefe flirted with a run for United States Senate, to challenge incumbent Robert M. La Follette Jr., but he ultimately chose to run for re-election to the House instead. Keefe easily won his second term with 57% of the vote in the 1940 election.

In the 77th Congress, Keefe was appointed to the powerful House Appropriations Committee, and remained a member of that committee for the rest of his career in Congress. He continued his opposition to all aide to countries participating in World War II, saying that Lend-Lease would be tantamount to a declaration of war. His position shifted dramatically after the Attack on Pearl Harbor in December 1941. Keefe then embraced the war effort, but spent much of 1942 attempting to justify his previous anti-war position. Nevertheless, Keefe won his third term in 1942 by his largest margin yet, taking 62% of the vote.

Keefe won three more terms, serving until January 1951. In the 79th Congress, he was appointed to the Joint Committee on the Investigation of the Pearl Harbor Attack.

In 1950, Keefe announced he would retire from Congress, but Wisconsin press speculated that this was in preparation for a run for U.S. Senate or Governor in 1952. It's unknown if Keefe would have launched a campaign; on February 6, 1952, Keefe collapsed and died of a heart attack after giving a speech at a women's luncheon club in Neenah, Wisconsin.

== Personal life and family ==
Frank Keefe was the third of eight children born to Thomas Martin and Kathryn Rogene (née Forsythe) Keefe. Thomas Keefe was a child of Irish American immigrants, and one of the earliest settler families in Winnebago County; Thomas's elder brother was described as the first white child born in the town of Poygan, Wisconsin.

On December 13, 1912, Frank Keefe married Mildred Virginia Steele of Ripon, Wisconsin. They had three children together and were married for forty years before his death in 1952.

== Electoral history ==
=== U.S. House of Representatives (1936–1948) ===
| Year | Election | Date | Elected | | | | Defeated | | | | Total | Plurality |
|---|---|---|---|---|---|---|---|---|---|---|---|---|
| 1936 | Primary | Sep. 15 | Frank B. Keefe | Republican | 11,659 | 66.07% | Albert J. Pullen | Rep. | 5,988 | 33.93% | 17,647 | 5,671 |
| 1936 | General | Nov. 3 | Michael Reilly (inc) | Democratic | 41,688 | 39.33% | Frank B. Keefe | Rep. | 38,904 | 36.71% | 105,987 | 2,784 |
| 1936 | General | Nov. 3 | Michael Reilly (inc) | Democratic | 41,688 | 39.33% | Adam F. Poltl | Prog. | 25,395 | 23.96% | 105,987 | 2,784 |
| 1938 | General | Nov. 8 | Frank B. Keefe | Republican | 46,082 | 53.59% | Michael Reilly (inc) | Dem. | 25,842 | 30.06% | 85,982 | 20,240 |
| 1938 | General | Nov. 8 | Frank B. Keefe | Republican | 46,082 | 53.59% | Adam F. Poltl | Prog. | 13,258 | 15.42% | 85,982 | 20,240 |
| 1938 | General | Nov. 8 | Frank B. Keefe | Republican | 46,082 | 53.59% | Joseph Willihnganz | Union | 800 | 0.93% | 85,982 | 20,240 |
| 1940 | General | Nov. 5 | Frank B. Keefe (inc) | Republican | 66,821 | 57.42% | Jacob A. Fessler | Dem. | 30,162 | 25.92% | 116,371 | 36,659 |
| 1940 | General | Nov. 5 | Frank B. Keefe (inc) | Republican | 66,821 | 57.42% | Walter D. Corrigan Sr. | Prog. | 19,387 | 16.66% | 116,371 | 36,659 |
| 1942 | General | Nov. 3 | Frank B. Keefe (inc) | Republican | 41,385 | 62.18% | Eugene Schallern | Dem. | 13,364 | 20.08% | 66,556 | 28,021 |
| 1942 | General | Nov. 3 | Frank B. Keefe (inc) | Republican | 41,385 | 62.18% | Adam F. Poltl | Prog. | 10,645 | 15.99% | 66,556 | 28,021 |
| 1942 | General | Nov. 3 | Frank B. Keefe (inc) | Republican | 41,385 | 62.18% | John C. Boll | Soc. | 1,157 | 1.74% | 66,556 | 28,021 |
| 1944 | General | Nov. 7 | Frank B. Keefe (inc) | Republican | 74,487 | 66.54% | Henry Danes | Dem. | 36,180 | 32.32% | 111,950 | 38,307 |
| 1944 | General | Nov. 7 | Frank B. Keefe (inc) | Republican | 74,487 | 66.54% | John C. Boll | Soc. | 1,282 | 1.15% | 111,950 | 38,307 |
| 1946 | General | Nov. 5 | Frank B. Keefe (inc) | Republican | 58,444 | 64.21% | Edwin W. Webster | Dem. | 31,550 | 34.66% | 91,023 | 26,894 |
| 1946 | General | Nov. 5 | Frank B. Keefe (inc) | Republican | 58,444 | 64.21% | Rudolph Renn | Soc. | 991 | 1.09% | 91,023 | 26,894 |
| 1948 | General | Nov. 2 | Frank B. Keefe (inc) | Republican | 60,675 | 55.51% | Kenneth Kunde | Dem. | 47,844 | 43.77% | 109,312 | 12,831 |
| 1948 | General | Nov. 2 | Frank B. Keefe (inc) | Republican | 60,675 | 55.51% | Rudolph Renn | Soc. | 793 | 0.73% | 109,312 | 12,831 |

U.S. House of Representatives
| Preceded by Michael Reilly | Member of the U.S. House of Representatives from Wisconsin's 6th congressional district January 3, 1939 - January 3, 1951 | Succeeded by William Van Pelt |
Legal offices
| Preceded by David K. Allen | District Attorney of Winnebago County, Wisconsin; January 1, 1927 – January 1, 1933 | Succeeded by R. C. Laus |
