= 1928 United States Senate election in Wisconsin =

- November 6, 1928
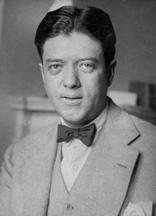

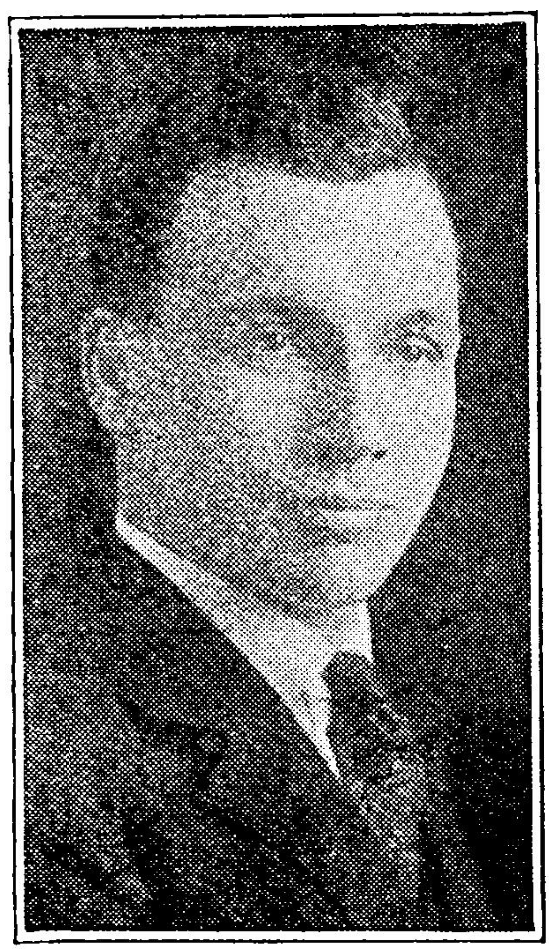
Nominee	Robert La Follette Jr.	William H. Markham
Party	Republican	Independent Republican
Popular vote	635,376	81,302
Percentage	85.57%	10.92%
- County results La Follete: 70–80% 80–90% >90%
U.S. senator before election
Robert La Follette Jr.
Republican
Elected U.S. Senator
Robert La Follette Jr.
Republican

The 1928 United States Senate election in Wisconsin was held on November 6, 1928.

Incumbent Republican U.S. Senator Robert La Follette Jr., who had won a special election to finish his late father's term in 1925, was elected to a full term in office.

La Follette had to fend off two challenges from his own party, defeating George W. Mead in the party primary and Republican State Senator William H. Markham in the general election. Markham ran as a pro-Hoover "Regular Republican."

== Republican primary ==
=== Candidates ===
- Robert M. La Follette Jr., incumbent Senator since 1925
- George W. Mead

=== Results ===
1928 Republican U.S. Senate primary
Party	Candidate	Votes	%
Republican	Robert M. La Follette Jr. (incumbent)	322,979	66.71%
Republican	George W. Mead	161,156	33.29%
Total votes		484,135	100.00%

== Democratic primary ==
=== Candidates ===
- Michael K. Reilly, former U.S. representative (1913–1917)

=== Results ===
1928 Democratic U.S. Senate primary
Party	Candidate	Votes	%
Democratic	Michael K. Reilly	38,432	100.00%
Total votes		38,432	100.00%

== Prohibition primary ==
=== Candidates ===
- David W. Emerson

=== Results ===
1928 Prohibition U.S. Senate primary
Party	Candidate	Votes	%
Prohibition	David W. Emerson	827	100.00%
Total votes		827	100.00%

== General election ==
=== Candidates ===
- David W. Emerson (Prohibition)
- John Kasun (Workers)
- Richard Koeppel (Labor)
- Robert M. La Follette Jr., incumbent Senator since 1925 (Republican)
- William H. Markham, State Senator from Horicon (Independent Republican)
- Michael K. Reilly (Democratic) (withdrew)

=== Campaign ===
The Democratic Party of Wisconsin decided to endorse the progressive La Follette after he won the Republican primary. The Democrats asked their own nominee, Michael K. Reilly, to withdraw from the race; he agreed, announcing his decision on October 8. This was part of a broader attempt at a coalition between progressives and Democrats in Wisconsin to throw the state to Democrat Al Smith in the concurrent presidential election.

=== Results ===
1928 U.S. Senate election in Wisconsin
Party	Candidate	Votes	%	±%
Republican	Robert La Follette Jr. (incumbent)	635,376	85.57%	▲19.06
Independent Republican	William H. Markham	81,302	10.95%	▼14.98
Prohibition	David W. Emerson	21,359	2.88%	N/A
Socialist Labor	Richard Koeppel	3,053	0.41%	▲0.18
Communist	John Kasun	1,463	0.20%	N/A
Write-in		92	100.00%	
Total votes		742,645	100.00%	
Republican hold				

== See also ==
- 1928 United States Senate elections
