= Freidorf Orthodox Church =

Roman Orthodox church in Timișoara, Romania

Church of the Descent of the Holy Spirit
- Biserica „Pogorârea Sfântului Duh”

Religion
- Affiliation: Romanian Orthodox
- Patron: Descent of the Holy Spirit
- Year consecrated: 1980
- Status: Active

Location
- Location: Freidorf, Timișoara, Romania
- Interactive map of Church of the Descent of the Holy Spirit
- Coordinates: 45.7304235°N 21.17536°E

Architecture
- Groundbreaking: 1975
- Completed: 1980
- Materials: Brick

The Church of the Descent of the Holy Spirit (Romanian: Biserica „Pogorârea Sfântului Duh”) is a Romanian Orthodox church in the Freidorf district of Timișoara, Romania.

== History ==
Until 1 April 1938, the Freidorf Orthodox parish was a subunit of the Utvin parish, overseen by Priest Aurel Brancu from Utvin. Following that, for a year, the parish administration was entrusted to Priest Constantin Micu. Starting on 14 October 1939, Priest Simion Lugojan, who had been transferred from the Șuștra parish, is noted as the parish priest.

On 1 August 1942, the Freidorf parish was officially acknowledged by the Ministry of National Culture and Religious Affairs through act no. 39604/1942, with the decision published in the Official Gazette no. 167/1942. A year later, on 11 March 1943, the Diocesan Council formally recognized Priest Simion Lugojan as the parish priest during their meeting.

The current brick church was built between 1975 and 1980 on land left as a donation by Harțiu B. Franghianu, the general director of Macedonian origin of the Freidorf sugar factory in 1941. Since it was built during the communist era, official documents referred to it as a meeting hall. It was consecrated in 1980 by Metropolitan Nicolae Corneanu, alongside Timotei Seviciu of Arad, who was then serving as the Vicar Bishop of the Archbishopric of Timișoara. The church's mural was painted by Ion Sulea-Gorj and Ioan Someșanu.

A social-cultural center intended for organizing activities for children and youth, as well as conferences, book launches or catechesis, was consecrated by Metropolitan Ioan Selejan in 2022.
