= Michael Reilly (Wisconsin politician) =

Irish-American politician (1869–1944)

Michael K. Reilly
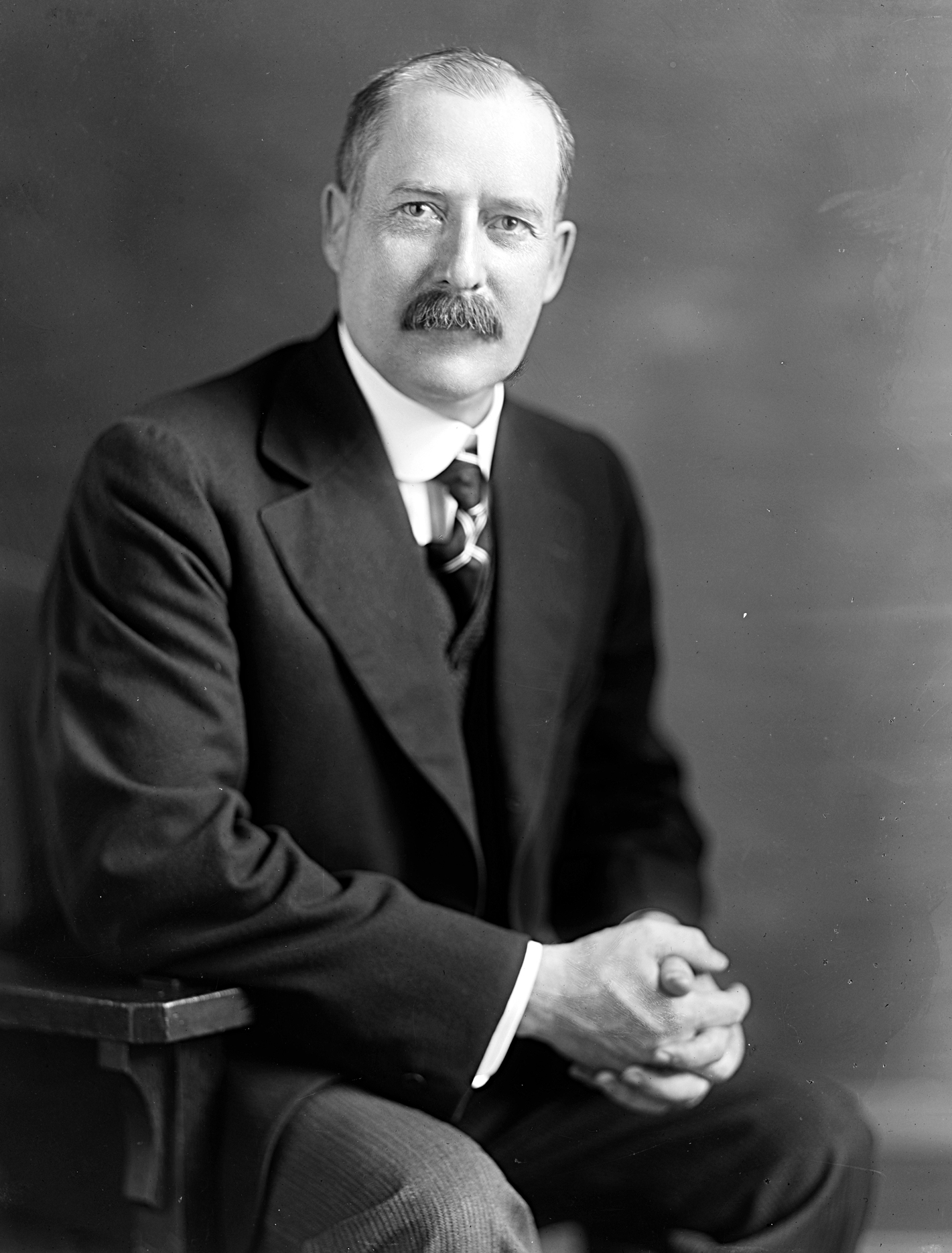
- Portrait by Harris & Ewing c. 1915

Member of the U.S. House of Representatives from Wisconsin's 6th district
- In office December 1, 1930 – January 3, 1939
- Preceded by: Florian Lampert
- Succeeded by: Frank Bateman Keefe
- In office March 4, 1913 – March 3, 1917
- Preceded by: Michael E. Burke
- Succeeded by: James H. Davidson

District Attorney of Fond du Lac County
- In office January 1, 1899 – January 1, 1901
- Preceded by: Herbert E. Swett
- Succeeded by: Ray L. Morse

Personal details
- Born: July 15, 1869 Empire, Wisconsin, U.S.
- Died: October 14, 1944 (aged 75) Neptune Township, New Jersey, U.S.
- Resting place: Woodlawn Cemetery, The Bronx
- Party: Democratic
- Spouse: Mary Isobel Hall (m. 1935–1944)
- Education: Oshkosh Normal School; University of Wisconsin (B.A.); University of Wisconsin Law School (LL.B.)
- Profession: Lawyer, politician

Michael Kieran Reilly (July 15, 1869 – October 14, 1944) was an Irish American lawyer and Democratic politician from Fond du Lac, Wisconsin. He served six full terms and one partial term in the U.S. House of Representatives, representing Wisconsin's 6th congressional district from 1913 to 1917, and from December 1930 to January 1939. Earlier in his career, he served as district attorney of Fond du Lac County and city attorney of Fond du Lac.

== Early life ==
Michael K. Reilly was born in the town of Empire, Wisconsin, in Fond du Lac County, to Michael Reilly and Margaret Phelan, on July 15, 1869. After completing his primary education, he graduated from the Oshkosh Normal School (now University of Wisconsin–Oshkosh). He taught school for several seasons before continuing his University of Wisconsin–Madison. He graduated from the University of Wisconsin–Madison College of Letters and Science in 1894, and then graduated from the University of Wisconsin Law School in 1895.

After graduating from law school, he worked for a year at the Milwaukee law office of former district attorney John M. Clarke. After a year, he returned to Oshkosh, Wisconsin, and partnered with George E. Williams in a firm known as Williams & Reilly. Soon after, Reilly's younger brother, James P. Reilly, joined the firm as Reilly, Williams & Reilly, with offices in Fond du Lac.

== Early political career ==
During his college years and early legal career, Reilly also became active in politics with the Democratic Party of Wisconsin, and campaigned for Democratic candidates in the counties around Oshkosh and Fond du Lac. Reilly made his first run for public office in 1898, running for Fond du Lac County district attorney on the Democratic Party ticket. He won the general election and served as district attorney for a two-year term.

Reilly was not a candidate for re-election in 1900. He focused on his legal practice for the next several years, but remained an active campaigner for Democratic Party candidates, and participated in several local and state Democratic Party conventions. In January 1905, he was appointed city attorney of Fond du Lac, and served five years in that office. During that time, he was elected a delegate to the 1908 Democratic National Convention in Denver, Colorado.

== First terms in Congress (1910–1917) ==
Wisconsin's 6th congressional district 1902–1911

Reilly made his first run for U.S. House of Representatives in 1910, running for the Democratic Party nomination in Wisconsin's 6th congressional district. At the time, the 6th congressional district comprised Fond du Lac, Sheboygan, Ozaukee, Washington, and Dodge counties, in eastern Wisconsin. The district had been safely Democratic in each of the elections under this map configuration, but in 1910 the incumbent representative, Charles H. Weisse, announced he would run for U.S. Senate rather than seeking re-election to the House.

Reilly faced a difficult primary against former state senator Michael E. Burke, who was then the incumbent mayor of Beaver Dam, Wisconsin. Burke was well-liked among Democratic leaders in the district, and had been encouraged to run for the seat in previous elections. A third candidate, incumbent Fond du Lac mayor Everett W. Clark, also sought the nomination; as another prominent resident of Fond du Lac, he ended up splitting the vote from that county. Reilly ultimately fell 1,300 votes short of Burke, taking 35% of the vote.

Wisconsin's 6th congressional district 1912–1931

After the 1910 election, Wisconsin underwent a major redistricting, and the 6th district was radically transformed. Fond du Lac was the only county remaining of the old 6th district, with Manitowoc, Calumet, Winnebago, Green Lake, and Marquette counties added. The incumbent, Burke, was a resident of Dodge County, and was therefore drawn out of the district.

By the end of 1911, Reilly and his allies were already making clear that he would run for Congress again in the new district. The new district was also more friendly to Reilly due to the inclusion of Oshkosh, where he had many friends and former clients and colleagues. He officially announced his candidacy in February 1912. Reilly faced another challenging primary, this time against state senator Samuel W. Randolph of Manitowoc. This time Reilly prevailed, receiving 56% of the vote.

In the general election, Reilly faced Republican James H. Davidson, who had been the incumbent in the 8th congressional district but had been drawn into the new 6th district by the redistricting. Davidson had also faced a difficult primary in the new district, against a progressive opponent, and barely survived. The ideological rift exposed in the primary continued to haunt Davidson in the general election, as his longtime ally, the Oshkosh Northwestern abandoned him and endorsed Reilly as a more progressive choice. Reilly narrowly defeated Davidson in the general election, receiving 48% of the vote to Davidson's 45%.

Reilly had an uneventful first term in the 63rd Congress among the large Democratic majority. He drew no opponent at the 1914 primary, but faced a rematch with former representative James H. Davidson at the general election. The general election margin in 1914 was nearly identical to the 1912 election, and Reilly won his second term. Reilly ran as a progressive in both elections. In 1914, he received the endorsement of Wisconsin progressive leader Robert M. La Follette; he was the only Democratic congressional candidate to receive La Follette's endorsement.

During the 64th Congress, Reilly was appointed to a coveted seat on the House Agriculture Committee, his only committee assignment for that term. During that term, he took a controversial position about enlarging the National Guard and mandating service for all young men. This was a dangerous hot button in the midst of World War I, when Democratic president Woodrow Wilson was still pledging to keep the United States out of the war. The politics of the issue were also complicated by the use of National Guard personnel to put down recent labor unrest. But Reilly remained staunchly anti-war, even after the sinking of the RMS Lusitania, which he referred to as the greatest crisis for the country since the American Civil War.

On a more local level, Reilly outraged some of his Democratic allies by recommending his wife's sister's husband for a postmaster position at Fond du Lac, rather than the local party's consensus pick, L. A. Lange, the owner and publisher of Fond du Lac's major newspaper, the Reporter. By the Spring of 1916, Reilly was facing a primary challenge from former Fond du Lac mayor Frank J. Wolff. Wolff was immediately endorsed by Reilly's 1910 primary opponent, former Fond du Lac mayor Everett W. Clark. Wolff, however, ultimately dropped out of the race and endorsed former Chilton mayor Frank J. Egerer.

Reilly won the primary, but Egerer took 35% of the vote. In the general election, he faced another rematch with former U.S. representative James H. Davidson. This time, the Oshkosh Northwestern and other Republican organs consolidated behind Davidson, principally to support the election of the full Republican ticket. Oshkosh-based interests also accused Reilly of being too consumed with the interests of Fond du Lac, at the expense of other parts of the district. In their third matchup, Davidson finally prevailed, winning an outright majority of the vote.

== Out of office (1917–1930) ==
Reilly resumed his legal practice after leaving office. His allies strongly encouraged him to run again in 1918; he declined to enter the race but remained active speaking and campaigning for the Democratic ticket. After the end of World War I, Reilly spoke around the state for several years in support of U.S. admission to the League of Nations; he also began courting women voters for the Democrats after the ratification of the Nineteenth Amendment to the United States Constitution. Reilly was named a member of the Democratic presidential elector slate for the 1920 United States presidential election; the Republican ticket carried the state of Wisconsin in the general election, however.

Reilly was a frequent attendee at Democratic state functions throughout this era. At the 1922 Democratic state convention, he nominated Wisconsin League of Women Voters president Jessie Jack Hooper as candidate for U.S. Senate. She received the unanimous support of the convention and went on to be the first female candidate for federal office from Wisconsin.

In 1923, Reilly became an early supporter of Oscar Underwood's campaign for the presidency in 1924. After Underwood declined to run, Reilly became a supporter of Al Smith, and was elected as a delegate for Smith to the 1924 Democratic National Convention.

Reilly's prominent campaigning in 1924 led newspapers to speculate that he would seek election as state attorney general or governor, but Reilly stated in July 1924 that he was "out of politics". Despite that statement, later that month his name was announced as a candidate for Congress again in the 6th congressional district as part of a statewide slate endorsed by the Democratic state convention. Reilly later described his nomination as having been "drafted" by the party. After the state party endorsement, Reilly faced no opponent in the Democratic primary, and went on to face the Republican incumbent, Florian Lampert, in the 1924 general election. Reilly ran as a strong opponent to Republican tariff policies, suggesting that the tariff acted as a tax on individual consumers, and said that Republicans had piled up too many new taxes on Wisconsin residents. He also accused the progressive Republicans of pursuing a socialist policy regime, and accused progressive leader Robert La Follette of engaging in class warfare. Lampert was re-elected in a landslide, in a Republican wave election.

Reilly remained active in politics and public speaking. A common theme of his speeches was the responsibility of citizenship. He often admonished citizens to remain informed on the issues of the day, vote in all elections, and volunteer for service in the armed forces. Reilly also often cast himself as a defender of the Constitution; he opposed the Child Labor Amendment, saying that constitutional amendments should not be used solely to bypass Supreme Court decisions. In the 1920s, he was regarded by the political press as one of the most effective Democratic speakers in the state. After the outbreak of the Cristero War in Mexico, Reilly gave a series of lectures on the issue, defending the Cristeros rebels and accusing the Mexican government of Communist infiltration.

=== U.S. Senate campaign (1928) ===
After giving a compelling speech at the 1928 Democratic state convention, the convention endorsed Reilly as their choice to run for United States Senate in the 1928 election. Reilly secured the nomination without opposition, but after the primary, state Democrats determined to consolidate their support behind progressive Republican Robert M. La Follette Jr., and asked Reilly to withdraw from the race. Reilly announced his withdrawal from the race on October 8, 1928. This was part of a broader attempt at a coalition between progressives and Democrats in Wisconsin to throw the state to Democrat Al Smith in the concurrent presidential election.

== Return to Congress (1930–1939) ==
In July 1930, incumbent U.S. representative Florian Lampert died after a serious car accident. By the end of the month, Reilly announced he would run again in the 6th congressional district to succeed Lampert. A convention of Democrats in the 6th district blessed Reilly's candidacy, but also endorsed two other candidates, Dr. Clarendon J. Coombs and Morley G. Kelley. Due to Lampert's death, a special election to fill the office remaining months of the 71st Congress was held concurrent with the general election in 1930. Reilly won both primary elections with similar totals, receiving about 52% in both races.

The Republican nominee was Philip Lehner, a progressive attorney from Green Lake County who had twice previously run for the nomination unsuccessfully. The Oshkosh Northwestern painted the race was a foregone conclusion and predicted it would safely be retained by the Republicans. Other newspapers were more skeptical, predicting a Republican revolt against the Lehner nomination, due to Lehner's personal history and the complicated politics inside the Republican Party at the time. Lehner was a progressive, but was not liked by the progressive leadership aligned with John J. Blaine. Stalwart Republicans also sought to thwart the progressives in the 1930 election as retaliation for previous progressive alliances with Democrats against stalwart Republican nominees. Part of the progressive resentment against Lehner was also his endorsement of Prohibition. Reilly on the other hand was an unapologetic enemy of the Prohibition amendment; he had voted against it in Congress, and promised to seek its repeal if elected again. Republican stalwarts in the district did ultimately end up endorsing Reilly over Lehner, and their endorsement likely proved decisive—Reilly won the special and general election by 575 votes and 620 votes, respectively, receiving about 50% of the vote in both elections. Reilly was the only Democrat to win a U.S. House seat from Wisconsin in the 1930 election.

Reilly was sworn in at the start of the Winter 1930–1931 session in the 71st Congress. He pledged to cooperate with the Republican majority on any legislation to relieve the unemployment crisis caused by the start of the Great Depression. Oh his initial arrival in Washington, D.C., Reilly hired Harry E. Schlerf as his private secretary; Schlerf had served 11 years in the same position under the previous incumbent, Lampert, and had sought the Republican nomination to succeed him. Reilly also sought to ensure Lampert's last bill was passed by the House—a bill authorizing a federal survey of the Fox River for flood control plans. During this short term, Reilly also became one of the early advocates for censorship of the motion picture industry, saying "movies have done more to demoralize our people, young and old, than any other factor in our modern life." With no seats available on the House Agriculture Committee, Reilly was offered a seat on the House Banking Committee.

The political dynamics in the House changed dramatically with the start of the 72nd Congress, in March 1931, when the House majority was one of the smallest in the history of the Congress. At the start of that term, Republicans held 217 seats and Democrats held 216. A dispute between progressive and stalwart Republicans prevented them from organizing the House. By October 1931, Democrats had taken the majority in the House through special elections, and elected John Nance Garner speaker. Reilly maintained his advocacy for the repeal of Prohibition in this term; through his position on the banking committee, he introduced the Federal Home Loan Bank Act, which passed and was signed into law in the Summer of 1932.

Wisconsin's 6th congressional district 1932–1963

Due to the Reapportionment Act of 1929—which capped the total number of members of the U.S. House of Representatives at 438—Wisconsin lost a House seat in reapportionment following the 1930 census. Republicans held an overwhelming majority in the 60th Wisconsin Legislature, which took on the task of redistricting in 1931. Political press in Wisconsin largely expected that the Republican Legislature would shift the districts to pit Reilly, the sole Democrat, in an incumbent-vs-incumbent matchup. The politics of redistricting in 1931, however, were more complicated than partisanship—Wisconsin's prohibition and anti-prohibition forces had other priorities. Instead the new map pitted stalwart Republican Charles A. Kading against prohibition-supporting Republican John M. Nelson. But all of Wisconsin's remaining congressional districts were dramatically reshaped by the 1931 redistricting, and Reilly's 6th district was no exception. Manitowoc, Green Lake, and Marquette counties were removed from the district, Sheboygan, Washington, and Ozaukee counties were added. The changes actually had the effect of strengthening Reilly's chances of re-election with the addition of consistently Democratic-leaning Ozaukee and Washington counties.

In March 1932, Reilly endorsed Franklin Roosevelt over Al Smith, saying that Roosevelt was most likely to follow through on repealing Prohibition. In the fall, Reilly faced a primary challenge from former Sheboygan mayor Theodore Dieckmann, but Reilly easily defeated him, taking 73% of the primary vote. At the general election, Reilly faced a relatively strong Republican opponent in state senator L. J. Fellenz, the younger brother of his former law partner Henry M. Fellenz. Reilly won comfortably in the Democratic wave election. After winning re-election, Reilly was able to fulfill one of his chief political ambitions, voting for the Twenty-first Amendment to the United States Constitution at the end of the 72nd Congress—beginning the process of repealing the 18th Amendment.

The 1932 election ushered in President Franklin Roosevelt and large Democratic majorities in both chambers of Congress; Reilly was a loyal and reliable vote for Roosevelt's entire agenda. From his seat on the House Banking Committee, he participated in the crafting and passage of many of Roosevelt's early emergency acts to address the ongoing Great Depression, including the Emergency Banking Act of 1933, the Securities Act of 1933, and the 1933 Banking Act. Reilly also provided his vote for the federal pension-slashing Economy Act of March 20, 1933, despite the opposition of many in the Democratic caucus—the bill was so unpopular, Reilly felt the need to explain his vote to his constituents, writing, "President Roosevelt is the economic doctor in charge of our sick industrial world; he is the only hope of this country today; and if his economy and emergency legislative program fails, I tremble to think of our country's political and economic future.

Reilly faced another primary challenge in 1934, this time from businessman Charles R. Fiss. Fiss was a veteran of World War I, an active member of the American Legion, and a member of the Democratic State Central Committee. He disapproved of several of Reilly's votes on legislation impacting veterans, and vocally supported a more aggressive redistribution of wealth. Reilly won the primary by a wide margin, taking 68% of the vote.

Earlier that year, the Wisconsin Progressive Party formally split from the Republican Party of Wisconsin, after decades of intra-party feuding. The emergence of a potent third party complicated politics throughout the state. In the general election in the 6th congressional district, Reilly faced Republican businessman William J. Campbell and Progressive attorney Walter D. Corrigan Sr. With all three candidates receiving significant support from their constituencies, Reilly managed to prevail with just 42% of the vote.

The 74th Congress was another active term on the banking committee, Reilly was involved in drafting the Banking Act of 1935 and the reauthorization of the Reconstruction Finance Corporation; he also gave an empassioned speech on the House floor urging passage of the reauthorization. Reilly had also advocated for several years for finding new revenue sources to begin to address the growing federal budget deficit and was cheered by Roosevelt's endorsement of the Revenue Act of 1935. He voted, along with most of the Democratic caucus, for the Social Security Act, but broke with Roosevelt over his preferred version of the Public Utility Holding Company Act of 1935, believing the corporate death penalty included in the act would ultimately just punish common shareholders. Reilly ran afoul of the veteran community again over the Adjusted Compensation Payment Act, which offered payment to veterans in response to the Bonus Army movement. Roosevelt initially vetoed the act but Congress overrode his veto; Reilly was among the minority who voted against overriding Roosevelt's veto.

Reilly also outraged several farm groups over his continued opposition to the Frazier–Lemke Farm Bankruptcy Act; the issue was inflamed by national radio pioneer demagogue Father Charles Coughlin, who suggested Reilly was "controlled by Wall Street". Reilly later signed the discharge petition to bring the Frazier–Lemke bill to the floor, but said he still planned to vote against it, leading to attacks from both sides. In the end, he was the only member of the Wisconsin delegation to vote against the bill. Reilly had further problems with farmers over the replacement for the Agricultural Adjustment Act, which had been struck down by the U.S. Supreme Court. Wisconsin farmers found the replacement legislation, the Soil Conservation and Domestic Allotment Act of 1936, insufficient and potentially dangerous to their interests—Reilly again was alone as the only member of the Wisconsin delegation to vote in favor of the law.

Reilly avoided a primary challenge in 1936 but faced another perilous three-way general election against Republican Frank Bateman Keefe, a popular attorney from Oshkosh, and Progressive state representative Adam F. Poltl, also at that time the mayor of Hartford, Wisconsin. Keefe ran an energetic and aggressive campaign against the Roosevelt agenda, accusing him of wasteful spending and challenging Reilly on the effect of the administrations anti-tariff policies on Wisconsin farmers. Poltl accused Reilly of insufficient liberalism, pointing to his opposition to the more generous Townsend plan for old age pensions, and to his positions on farm legislation which tended to be less generous to Wisconsin farmers. Reilly narrowly survived the election, receiving just 39% of the vote.

After nearly losing his seat in 1936, Wisconsin newspapers and political prognosticators predicted Reilly would not survive the mid-term election of 1938. Reilly sought to mitigate his weaknesses during the 75th Congress. To attempt to repair his relationship with farmers, he voted with the rest of the Wisconsin delegation to override the Roosevelt veto on H.R. 6763—a measure which extended and expanded an emergency mortgage relief law. He also sought an alliance with the progressives to obtain their support for his federal race, in exchange for his support for their state candidates. Reilly remained a mostly reliable vote for Roosevelt, however, and was one of only two Wisconsin representatives to vote for Roosevelt's government reorganization legislation in 1938.

In 1938, Reilly drew another primary challenge, this time from Joseph Willihnganz of Sheboygan. Willihnganz was a first-time candidate who criticized Reilly for too much adherence to whatever Roosevelt demanded; he said: "I don't agree with him on that because I don't think President Roosevelt is a democrat." Willihnganz argued for a more radical approach, including government ownership of banks. After losing the Democratic nomination to Reilly, Willihnganz agreed to run in the general election under the Union Party banner. In addition to Willihnganz, Reilly faced a general election rematch with his 1936 opponents, Keefe and Poltl. Keefe ran a more belligerent campaign than 1936, openly feuding with Wisconsin newspaper editors. He again attempted to nationalize the campaign, attacking Roosevelt as a "dictator" over his court-packing plan and a proposed government reorganization plan. Keefe also adopted populist positions, such as endorsing the Townsend plan for old-age pensions, which Reilly had previously rejected. It was a disastrous mid-term for the Democrats and Reilly was soundly defeated in his election; Keefe received an outright majority with 53.6% of the vote.

After losing his seat in Congress, Reilly did not run for office again, but remained an active public speaker on behalf of the Democratic Party and Roosevelt.

== Personal life and family ==
Michael K. Reilly was the seventh of nine children born to Irish American immigrants Michael Reilly and Margaret (née Phelan). The Reilly family were members of the Catholic Church, and Michael K. Reilly was an active member of the Catholic Order of Foresters and the Knights of Columbus.

He married late in life, marrying Mary Isobel Hall in September 1935, when Reilly was 66 years old and serving his sixth term in Congress. Mary Hall was a celebrated soprano. Reilly's best man at the wedding was Leo Crowley, the chairman of the Federal Deposit Insurance Corporation. Michael Reilly had no children, and died just 9 years after his marriage. He died at Neptune Township, New Jersey, on October 14, 1944. He was interred at his wife's family plot, at Woodlawn Cemetery in the Bronx, New York.

== Electoral history ==
=== U.S. House (1910–1916) ===
Year	Election	Date	Elected				Defeated				Total	Plurality
1910	Primary	Sep. 6	Michael E. Burke	Democratic	5,622	45.15%	Michael K. Reilly	Dem.	4,368	35.08%	12,452	1,254
1910	Primary	Sep. 6	Michael E. Burke	Democratic	5,622	45.15%	Everett W. Clark	Dem.	2,462	19.77%	12,452	1,254
1912	Primary	Sep. 3	Michael K. Reilly	Democratic	4,213	56.08%	Samuel W. Randolph	Dem.	3,300	43.92%	7,513	913
1912	General	Nov. 5	Michael K. Reilly	Democratic	16,742	48.65%	James H. Davidson	Rep.	15,505	45.06%	34,411	1,237
1912	General	Nov. 5	Michael K. Reilly	Democratic	16,742	48.65%	Martin Georgenson	Soc.D.	1,659	4.82%	34,411	1,237
1912	General	Nov. 5	Michael K. Reilly	Democratic	16,742	48.65%	Frank L. Smith	Proh.	505	1.47%	34,411	1,237
1914	General	Nov. 3	Michael K. Reilly (inc)	Democratic	15,115	49.54%	James H. Davidson	Rep.	13,998	45.88%	30,512	1,117
1914	General	Nov. 3	Michael K. Reilly (inc)	Democratic	15,115	49.54%	Martin Georgenson	Soc.D.	1,005	3.29%	30,512	1,117
1914	General	Nov. 3	Michael K. Reilly (inc)	Democratic	15,115	49.54%	Verner N. Weeks	Proh.	392	1.28%	30,512	1,117
1916	Primary	Sep. 5	Michael K. Reilly (inc)	Democratic	3,337	64.23%	Frank J. Egerer	Dem.	1,858	35.77%	5,195	1,479
1916	General	Nov. 7	James H. Davidson	Republican	20,317	52.33%	Michael K. Reilly (inc)	Dem.	17,080	43.99%	38,825	3,237
1916	General	Nov. 7	James H. Davidson	Republican	20,317	52.33%	Robert Zingler	Soc.D.	929	2.39%	38,825	3,237
1916	General	Nov. 7	James H. Davidson	Republican	20,317	52.33%	Clarence O. Tinkham	Proh.	498	1.28%	38,825	3,237

=== U.S. House (1924) ===
Year	Election	Date	Elected				Defeated				Total	Plurality
1924	General	Nov. 4	Florian Lampert (inc)	Republican	45,982	70.62%	Michael K. Reilly	Dem.	19,128	29.38%	65,116	26,854

=== U.S. House (1930–1938) ===
Year	Election	Date	Elected				Defeated				Total	Plurality
1930 (special)	Primary	Sep. 16	Michael K. Reilly	Democratic	1,470	51.76%	C. J. Combs	Dem.	832	29.30%	2,840	638
1930 (special)	Primary	Sep. 16	Michael K. Reilly	Democratic	1,470	51.76%	Morley G. Kelley	Dem.	538	18.94%	2,840	638
1930 (special)	Special	Nov. 4	Michael K. Reilly	Democratic	25,400	50.56%	Philip Lehner	Rep.	24,825	49.41%	50,241	575
1930 (special)	Special	Nov. 4	Michael K. Reilly	Democratic	25,400	50.56%	Leonard L. Gudex	Soc.	16	0.03%	50,241	575
1930	Primary	Sep. 16	Michael K. Reilly	Democratic	1,494	52.06%	C. J. Combs	Dem.	794	27.67%	2,870	700
1930	Primary	Sep. 16	Michael K. Reilly	Democratic	1,494	52.06%	Morley G. Kelley	Dem.	582	20.28%	2,870	700
1930	General	Nov. 4	Michael K. Reilly	Democratic	25,605	50.24%	Philip Lehner	Rep.	24,985	49.02%	50,964	620
1930	General	Nov. 4	Michael K. Reilly	Democratic	25,605	50.24%	Leonard L. Gudex	Soc.	374	0.73%	50,964	620
1932	Primary	Sep. 20	Michael K. Reilly (inc)	Democratic	12,647	73.51%	Theodore Dieckmann	Dem.	4,555	26.48%	17,204	8,092
1932	General	Nov. 8	Michael K. Reilly (inc)	Democratic	59,055	59.07%	L. J. Fellenz	Rep.	38,708	38.72%	99,971	20,347
1932	General	Nov. 8	Michael K. Reilly (inc)	Democratic	59,055	59.07%	Franklin Pfeiffer	Soc.	2,208	2.21%	99,971	20,347
1934	Primary	Sep. 18	Michael K. Reilly (inc)	Democratic	15,940	68.08%	Charles R. Fiss	Dem.	7,472	31.92%	23,412	8,468
1934	General	Nov. 6	Michael K. Reilly (inc)	Democratic	34,664	42.29%	Walter D. Corrigan Sr.	Prog.	28,477	34.74%	81,966	6,187
1934	General	Nov. 6	Michael K. Reilly (inc)	Democratic	34,664	42.29%	William J. Campbell	Rep.	18,825	22.97%	81,966	6,187
1936	General	Nov. 3	Michael K. Reilly (inc)	Democratic	41,688	39.33%	Frank B. Keefe	Rep.	38,904	36.71%	105,987	2,784
1936	General	Nov. 3	Michael K. Reilly (inc)	Democratic	41,688	39.33%	Adam F. Poltl	Prog.	25,395	23.96%	105,987	2,784
1938	Primary	Sep. 20	Michael K. Reilly (inc)	Democratic	11,745	75.43%	Joseph Willihnganz	Dem.	3,825	24.57%	15,570	7,920
1938	General	Nov. 8	Frank B. Keefe	Republican	46,082	53.59%	Michael K. Reilly (inc)	Dem.	25,842	30.06%	85,982	20,240
1938	General	Nov. 8	Frank B. Keefe	Republican	46,082	53.59%	Adam F. Poltl	Prog.	13,258	15.42%	85,982	20,240
1938	General	Nov. 8	Frank B. Keefe	Republican	46,082	53.59%	Joseph Willihnganz	Union	800	0.93%	85,982	20,240

U.S. House of Representatives
Preceded by Michael E. Burke	Member of the U.S. House of Representatives from Wisconsin's 6th congressional district March 4, 1913 – March 3, 1917	Succeeded by James H. Davidson
Preceded by Florian Lampert	Member of the U.S. House of Representatives from Wisconsin's 6th congressional district December 1, 1930 – January 3, 1939	Succeeded by Frank Bateman Keefe
Legal offices
Preceded by Herbert E. Swett	District Attorney of Fond du Lac County, Wisconsin; January 1, 1899 – January 1, 1901	Succeeded by Ray L. Morse
