= James H. Davidson =

American politician (1858–1918)

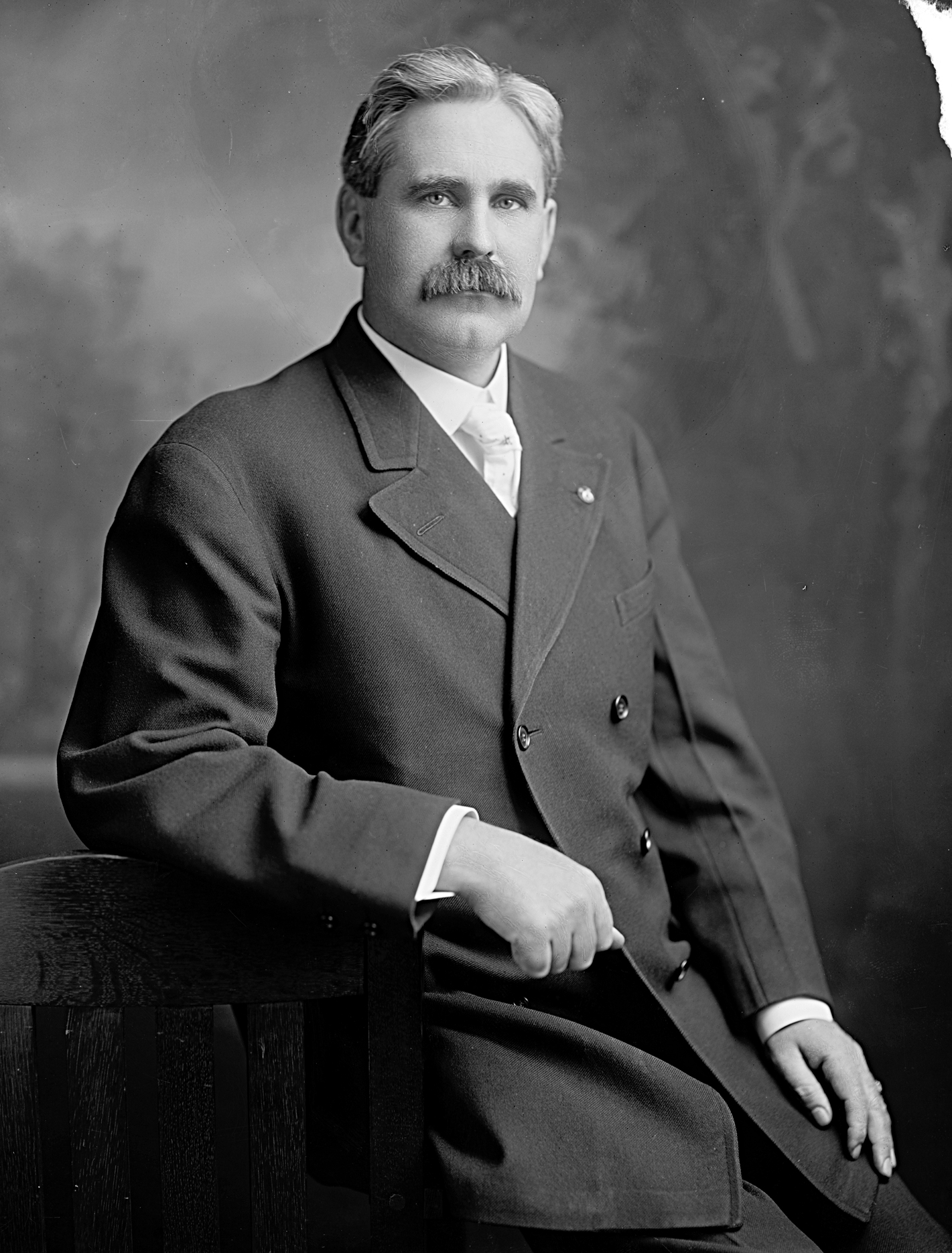
- Photo ca.1910 from the Harris & Ewing collection

Chair of the House Committee on Railways and Canals
- In office March 4, 1901 – March 3, 1911
- Preceded by: Charles A. Chickering
- Succeeded by: Charles A. Korbly

Member of the U.S. House of Representatives from Wisconsin
- In office March 4, 1897 – March 3, 1913
- Preceded by: Samuel A. Cook (6th); Edward S. Minor (8th)
- Succeeded by: Charles H. Weisse (6th); Edward E. Browne (8th)
- Constituency: 6th district (1897-1903); 8th district (1903-13)
- In office March 4, 1917 – August 6, 1918
- Preceded by: Michael K. Reilly
- Succeeded by: Florian Lampert
- Constituency: 6th district

District Attorney of Green Lake County, Wisconsin
- In office January 1, 1889 – January 1, 1891
- Preceded by: Perry Niskern
- Succeeded by: John L. Millard

Personal details
- Born: June 18, 1858 Colchester, New York, U.S.
- Died: August 6, 1918 (aged 60) Washington, D.C., U.S.
- Resting place: Riverside Cemetery, Oshkosh, Wisconsin
- Party: Republican
- Spouse: Niva Therese Wilde (m. 1889–1918)
- Children: Kenneth Wilde Davidson^{(b. 1891; died 1938)}; James Ferdinand Davidson^{(b. 1896; died 1972)}; Avery Ann (Long)^{(b. 1902; died 1963)}
- Education: Albany Law School
- Profession: Lawyer
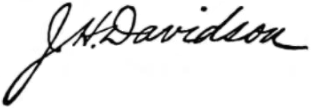
- Signature

James Henry Davidson (June 18, 1858 – August 6, 1918) was an American lawyer and Republican politician from Oshkosh, Wisconsin. He represented eastern Wisconsin for nine terms in the U.S. House of Representatives, serving from 1897 to 1913, and from 1917 until his death in 1918. He was chairman of the House Committee on Railways and Canals from 1901 to 1911. Earlier in his career, he was district attorney of Green Lake County, Wisconsin, and city attorney of Oshkosh.

== Early life and education ==
James H. Davidson was born in the town of Colchester, New York, and raised on his father's farm. As a child, he attended the district schools in the Winters and worked on his father's farm, or joined him lumbering in the nearby woods the rest of the year. At age 18, he began teaching school in Delaware and Sullivan counties to raise funds to further his education. He attended the Walton Academy, in the nearby town of Walton, New York, and worked as a janitor to help pay his tuition.

During these years, he determined to become a lawyer and began studying law in the office of Samuel H. Fancher and Albert H. Sewell. In 1883, he was able to attend Albany Law School with a loan from a family friend. He graduated in 1884 as president of his class and was admitted to the bar at Binghamton, New York. Within months, he decided to move out west for new opportunities.

== Legal career ==
He arrived at Princeton, Wisconsin, in August 1884. At the time, he found little opportunity as a lawyer, so instead went to work dealing grain and produce for Chittenden & Morse. Through his employment with Elmer D. Morse, then one of the most important businessmen in the city, he was quickly able to repay his debt for his school loan. By the fall of 1887, he was able to begin his law practice in earnest.

Davidson grew in prominence in legal and political circles. In 1888, he was elected district attorney of Green Lake County, Wisconsin, serving a two-year term. In 1890 he was elected chairman of the Republican congressional committee for Wisconsin's 6th congressional district. A short time later, he moved to the larger neighboring city of Oshkosh, Wisconsin, where he expanded his legal practice. He was appointed attorney there in 1895.

== Congress ==
Wisconsin's 6th congressional district 1892–1901

In 1896, the incumbent representative in Wisconsin's 6th congressional district, Samuel A. Cook, announced he would not run for re-election. Davidson, then wrapping up his sixth year as chairman of the Republican organization in that district, was easily nominated at the congressional district convention in August. In the general election, Davidson prevailed with 57% of the vote over Democrat William F. Gruenewald. At the time, the 6th congressional district comprised Davidson's home county, Winnebago, plus Calumet, Manitowoc, Fond du Lac, Marquette, Green Lake, and Waushara.

During his first term, in the 55th Congress, Davidson gave a lengthy speech supporting the annexation of Hawaii; his speech was then printed and distributed as a pamphlet. Davidson was appointed to the House Committee on Rivers and Harbors, which allowed him to play an important role in appropriating funds for projects relevant to his part of the state. When running for re-election, Wisconsin newspapers remarked that Davidson had a notable first term, and was diligent and attentive to constituent services and issues of local concern. He was easily renominated, but had a more competitive general election, receiving just 53% of the vote against Democrat Frank C. Stewart. In 1900, he faced former state representative James W. Watson, but won by a comfortable margin.

Wisconsin's 8th congressional district 1902–1911

Following the 1900 United States census, Wisconsin was apportioned an additional seat in the U.S. House of Representatives, necessitating a significant redistricting of the state's congressional map. Under the new map, the 6th congressional district shifted south, and Davidson was drawn into the 8th congressional district. His new district comprised the counties of Winnebago, Calumet, Manitowoc, and Waushara from his previous district, and added Portage and Waupaca. He faced some opposition for renomination at the 8th congressional district convention, but was renominated on the first ballot, receiving 65% of delegate votes. He won by a comfortable margin in the general election, receiving nearly 58% of the vote.

In the 57th Congress, Davidson was appointed chair of the House Committee on Railways and Canals. He would hold the chair for five terms. During the 1904 election season, Davidson was seriously ill with Typhoid fever, but was renominated and re-elected without serious difficulty. In 1906, Davidson was appointed to the executive committee of the National Republican Congressional Committee. 1906 was Wisconsin's first election in which party nominations were determined by primary election. Davidson faced no opponent in the primary, but the Democrats of the district failed to properly nominate any candidate for the primary. An emergency ruling of the Wisconsin Supreme Court ultimately determined that write-in primary candidate John E. McMullen would be considered the official nominee of the Democrats in the district and ordered his name to appear on the ballot, but McMullen did not actively campaign for the seat, and Davidson easily won his sixth term. He won again in 1908 and 1910 by similar margins.

Until 1912, Davidson largely avoided the bitter intra-party Republican feud of this era between progressive and stalwart factions. In 1912, however, he firmly endorsed the campaign of Wisconsin's progressive U.S. senator Robert M. La Follette seeking the Republican nomination for the presidency. Ultimately, La Follette did not win the nomination in 1912 and Theodore Roosevelt split the party with his progressive allies, starting the short-lived Bull Moose Party. Davidson did not leave the Republican Party, but ran a series of large newspaper advertisements that sought to make clear he considered himself a "progressive".

Wisconsin's 6th congressional district 1912–1931

Davidson's new ideological declaration was likely influenced by his changed political circumstances at home. The 1911 redistricting significantly rearranged his district again, drawing Davidson back into the 6th district, and nearly restoring the district to its pre-1902 boundaries. Davidson faced a serious primary challenge from James N. Tittemore of Omro, an avowed progressive who spent much of 1912 questioning Davidson's progressive record. Davidson narrowly survived the primary, defeating Tittemore by just 362 votes. After the primary, Davidson largely abandoned his attempts to appease the progressive faction and aggressively distanced himself from the progressive campaign of Theodore Roosevelt. The Oshkosh Northwestern, which had been supportive of all of his previous campaigns, declared themselves disillusioned with his 1912 campaign, and suggested the Democrat, Michael Reilly, was perhaps a more progressive choice. Reilly narrowly defeated Davidson in the general election, receiving 48% of the vote to Davidson's 45%.

Davidson took a short break after losing his seat, but quickly returned to politics, running for another term in the House in 1914. He faced a primary rematch with James Tittemore, but this time a third candidate, Philip Lehner, also sought the nomination. Davidson easily won the three-way contest, but lost the general election rematch to Reilly by a narrow margin. He ran again in 1916, and faced another three-way primary, prevailing again by a comfortable margin. In their third matchup, Davidson finally defeated Michael K. Reilly in the 1916 general election and reclaimed his seat in the House of Representatives.

During the 1916 campaign, Davidson ran on a platform of strict neutrality in World War I, and stuck to that position after his election. He was one of only fifty members of the House to vote against the declaration of war on Germany in April 1917. After war was declared, however, Davidson quickly agreed to support any necessary war measures, unlike some other opponents to the war.

== Death ==
Davidson announced in July 1917 that he would not run for another term in Congress after being hospitalized in Washington, D.C. After a month in the hospital, Davidson died of pericarditis. He was interred at Riverside Cemetery in Oshkosh.

== Personal life and family ==
James H. Davidson was the youngest of five children born to James Davidson and his wife Ann (née Johnson). His father was a farmer and lumberman, he was born in Scotland and emigrated as a child with his parents; his maternal grandfather was an Irish immigrant, and his maternal grandmother was a descendant of Jacobus Turck, a pioneer Dutch settler of the New Amsterdam colony.

James H. Davidson married Niva Therese Wilde, of Ripon, Wisconsin, on October 8, 1889. They had at least three children together and were married for nearly 29 years before Davidson's death in 1918. Mrs. Davidson lived to age 95.

== Electoral history ==
=== U.S. House, Wisconsin's 6th district (1896–1900) ===
Year	Election	Date	Elected				Defeated				Total	Plurality
1896	General	Nov. 3	James H. Davidson	Republican	26,649	57.66%	William F. Gruenewald	Dem.	18,944	40.99%	46,220	7,705
1896	General	Nov. 3	James H. Davidson	Republican	26,649	57.66%	James E. Thompson	Proh.	626	1.35%	46,220	7,705
1898	General	Nov. 8	James H. Davidson (inc)	Republican	20,107	53.58%	Frank C. Stewart	Dem.	16,680	44.45%	37,526	3,427
1898	General	Nov. 8	James H. Davidson (inc)	Republican	20,107	53.58%	William H. Clark	Proh.	738	1.97%	37,526	3,427
1900	General	Nov. 6	James H. Davidson (inc)	Republican	26,326	55.81%	James W. Watson	Dem.	19,758	41.89%	47,168	6,568
1900	General	Nov. 6	James H. Davidson (inc)	Republican	26,326	55.81%	Wesley Mott	Proh.	869	1.84%	47,168	6,568
1900	General	Nov. 6	James H. Davidson (inc)	Republican	26,326	55.81%	John Voss	Soc.D.	215	0.46%	47,168	6,568

=== U.S. House, Wisconsin's 8th district (1902–1910) ===
Year	Election	Date	Elected				Defeated				Total	Plurality
1902	General	Nov. 4	James H. Davidson	Republican	19,553	57.82%	Thomas H. Patterson	Dem.	12,651	37.41%	33,817	6,902
1902	General	Nov. 4	James H. Davidson	Republican	19,553	57.82%	Joseph Matthews	Proh.	811	2.40%	33,817	6,902
1902	General	Nov. 4	James H. Davidson	Republican	19,553	57.82%	Charles C. Fraim	Soc.D.	802	2.37%	33,817	6,902
1904	General	Nov. 8	James H. Davidson (inc)	Republican	25,233	63.10%	C. F. Crane	Dem.	12,889	32.23%	39,991	12,344
1904	General	Nov. 8	James H. Davidson (inc)	Republican	25,233	63.10%	John J. Pitz	Soc.D.	1,092	2.73%	39,991	12,344
1904	General	Nov. 8	James H. Davidson (inc)	Republican	25,233	63.10%	C. A. Smart	Proh.	777	1.94%	39,991	12,344
1906	General	Nov. 6	James H. Davidson (inc)	Republican	16,966	59.70%	John E. McMullen	Dem.	9,594	33.76%	28,417	7,372
1906	General	Nov. 6	James H. Davidson (inc)	Republican	16,966	59.70%	John J. Pitz	Soc.D.	1,103	3.88%	28,417	7,372
1906	General	Nov. 6	James H. Davidson (inc)	Republican	16,966	59.70%	Charles H. Forward	Proh.	700	2.46%	28,417	7,372
1906	General	Nov. 6	James H. Davidson (inc)	Republican	16,966	59.70%	William B. Minnahan	Ind.R.	54	0.19%	28,417	7,372
1908	General	Nov. 3	James H. Davidson (inc)	Republican	23,097	57.28%	Lyman J. Nash	Dem.	14,984	37.16%	40,321	8,113
1908	General	Nov. 3	James H. Davidson (inc)	Republican	23,097	57.28%	Martin Georgenson	Soc.D.	1,389	3.44%	40,321	8,113
1908	General	Nov. 3	James H. Davidson (inc)	Republican	23,097	57.28%	Byron E. Van Keuren	Proh.	851	2.11%	40,321	8,113
1910	General	Nov. 8	James H. Davidson (inc)	Republican	15,934	55.22%	Fred B. Rawson	Dem.	10,654	36.92%	28,857	5,280
1910	General	Nov. 8	James H. Davidson (inc)	Republican	15,934	55.22%	Richard W. Burke	Soc.D.	2,005	6.95%	28,857	5,280
1910	General	Nov. 8	James H. Davidson (inc)	Republican	15,934	55.22%	Charles H. Velte	Proh.	261	0.90%	28,857	5,280

=== U.S. House, Wisconsin's 6th district (1912–1916) ===
Year	Election	Date	Elected				Defeated				Total	Plurality
1912	Primary	Sep. 3	James H. Davidson	Republican	3,572	52.64%	James N. Tittemore	Rep.	3,210	47.30%	6,786	362
1912	General	Nov. 5	Michael K. Reilly	Democratic	16,742	48.65%	James H. Davidson	Rep.	15,505	45.06%	34,411	1,237
1912	General	Nov. 5	Michael K. Reilly	Democratic	16,742	48.65%	Martin Georgenson	Soc.D.	1,659	4.82%	34,411	1,237
1912	General	Nov. 5	Michael K. Reilly	Democratic	16,742	48.65%	Frank L. Smith	Proh.	505	1.47%	34,411	1,237
1914	Primary	Sep. 1	James H. Davidson	Republican	4,592	50.80%	Philip Lehner	Rep.	2,396	26.51%	9,039	2,196
1914	Primary	Sep. 1	James H. Davidson	Republican	4,592	50.80%	James N. Tittemore	Rep.	2,051	22.69%	9,039	2,196
1914	General	Nov. 3	Michael K. Reilly (inc)	Democratic	15,115	49.54%	James H. Davidson	Rep.	13,998	45.88%	30,512	1,117
1914	General	Nov. 3	Michael K. Reilly (inc)	Democratic	15,115	49.54%	Martin Georgenson	Soc.D.	1,005	3.29%	30,512	1,117
1914	General	Nov. 3	Michael K. Reilly (inc)	Democratic	15,115	49.54%	Verner N. Weeks	Proh.	392	1.28%	30,512	1,117
1916	Primary	Sep. 5	James H. Davidson	Republican	5,020	46.99%	James N. Tittemore	Rep.	3,029	28.36%	10,682	1,991
1916	Primary	Sep. 5	James H. Davidson	Republican	5,020	46.99%	August C. Dallman	Rep.	2,620	24.53%	10,682	1,991
1916	General	Nov. 7	James H. Davidson	Republican	20,317	52.33%	Michael K. Reilly (inc)	Dem.	17,080	43.99%	38,825	3,237
1916	General	Nov. 7	James H. Davidson	Republican	20,317	52.33%	Robert Zingler	Soc.D.	929	2.39%	38,825	3,237
1916	General	Nov. 7	James H. Davidson	Republican	20,317	52.33%	Clarence O. Tinkham	Proh.	498	1.28%	38,825	3,237

== See also ==
- List of members of the United States Congress who died in office (1900–1949)

== Sources ==
- United States Congress. "James H. Davidson (id: D000084)". Biographical Directory of the United States Congress.
- Obituary - New York Times
- James H. Davidson, late a representative from Wisconsin, Memorial addresses delivered in the House of Representatives and Senate frontispiece 1917

U.S. House of Representatives
Preceded by Samuel Andrew Cook	Member of the U.S. House of Representatives from Wisconsin's 6th congressional district March 4, 1897 – March 3, 1903	Succeeded by Charles H. Weisse
Preceded by Edward S. Minor	Member of the U.S. House of Representatives from Wisconsin's 8th congressional district March 4, 1903 – March 4, 1913	Succeeded by Edward E. Browne
Preceded by Michael K. Reilly	Member of the U.S. House of Representatives from Wisconsin's 6th congressional district March 4, 1917 – August 6, 1918 (died)	Succeeded by Florian Lampert
Preceded by Charles A. Chickering (New York)	Chair of the House Committee on Railways and Canals; March 4, 1901 – March 3, 1911	Succeeded by Charles A. Korbly (Indiana)
Legal offices
Preceded by Perry Niskern	District Attorney of Green Lake County, Wisconsin; January 1, 1889 – January 1, 1891	Succeeded by John L. Millard
