= John Abner Race =

American politician (1914 – 1983)

Member of the U.S. House of Representatives from Wisconsin's 6th district
- In office January 3, 1965 – January 3, 1967
- Preceded by: William Van Pelt
- Succeeded by: William A. Steiger

Personal details
- Born: May 12, 1914 Fond du Lac, Wisconsin, U.S.
- Died: November 9, 1983 (aged 69) Fond du Lac, Wisconsin, U.S.
- Party: Democratic

John Abner Race (May 12, 1914 – November 9, 1983) was a member of the United States House of Representatives from Wisconsin.

He was born in Fond du Lac, Wisconsin and graduated from Fond du Lac High School and attended the University of Wisconsin–Madison School for Workers. In 1958, Race was elected to the Fond du Lac County, Wisconsin Board of Supervisors. He ran unsuccessfully against Earl F. McEssy for the Wisconsin State Assembly in 1958. He also served on the state vocations board. He came to Congress on the coattails of Lyndon B. Johnson in 1964 as part of the 89th Congress when the Democrats gained a net of 36 seats. From 1965 to 1967 Race served on the House Committee of Interior and Insular Affairs. He was defeated for reelection to the 90th United States Congress in 1966 by William A. Steiger and also defeated in his run for the Wisconsin State Assembly in 1970.

Race was in the machine tool industry, in which he operated a crane for the Giddings & Lewis company, and was involved in the labor union, serving as chairman of the bargaining and grievance committee of Local Lodge 1420 of the International Association of Machinists and Aerospace Workers. He was heavily involved with local units of the Democratic Party. He died in Fond du Lac and is interred at the Estabrooks Cemetery, Fond du Lac, Wisconsin.

== Sources ==
- United States Congress. "John Abner Race (id: R000003)". Biographical Directory of the United States Congress.
- The Fighting Machinists, A Century of Struggle, by Robert G. Rodden
- United States House elections, 1964

U.S. House of Representatives
Preceded by William Van Pelt	Member of the U.S. House of Representatives from Wisconsin's 6th congressional district January 3, 1965 - January 3, 1967	Succeeded by William A. Steiger
