= Kenneth Kunde =

American politician

Kenneth Kunde (1916– January 28, 1992) was a politician in Wisconsin.

== Biography ==
Kunde attended what is now the University of Wisconsin-Oshkosh and served in the United States Army during World War II. Following the war, he was a member of the Wisconsin Army National Guard. Kunde was also a member of AMVETS. He died on January 28, 1992, in Sheboygan, Wisconsin.

== Political career ==
Kunde was a candidate for the United States House of Representatives from Wisconsin's 6th congressional district in 1948 and 1950. He lost to incumbent Frank Bateman Keefe in 1948 and to William Van Pelt in 1950. Later, he was a delegate to the 1952 Democratic National Convention. Kunde became Chairman of the Winnebago County, Wisconsin Democratic Party in 1957. He was then elected to the Wisconsin State Assembly in 1962, 1964 and 1966. In 1967, he resigned from the Assembly.

== Death ==
Kunde died January 28, 1992.
