= William Van Pelt =

American politician (1905–1996)

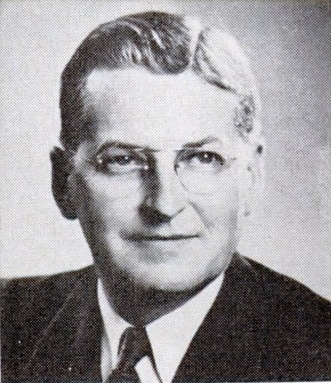

Member of the U.S. House of Representatives from Wisconsin's 6th district
- In office January 3, 1951 – January 3, 1965
- Preceded by: Frank Bateman Keefe
- Succeeded by: John Abner Race

Personal details
- Born: March 10, 1905 Glenbeulah, Wisconsin, U.S.
- Died: June 2, 1996 (aged 91) Fond du Lac, Wisconsin, U.S.
- Resting place: Rienzi Cemetery, Fond du Lac
- Party: Republican
- Spouses: Sophia Cornelia Schmidt (m. 1931; died 1962); Anne Trimble (m. 1962; died 1994)
- Children: Peter; Julie Ann
- Relatives: Clayton F. Van Pelt (brother)
- Occupation: Businessman

William Kaiser Van Pelt (March 10, 1905 – June 2, 1996) was an American businessman and Republican politician from Fond du Lac, Wisconsin. He served 14 years in the U.S. House of Representatives, representing Wisconsin's 6th congressional district from 1951 to 1965. He served on the House Science & Astronautics Committee during the first years of the space race.

== Early life and career ==
William Van Pelt was born in Glenbeulah, Wisconsin. As a child, he moved with his family to Fond du Lac, Wisconsin, where he resided for most of the rest of his life. He graduated from Fond du Lac High School in 1923.

In 1939, he became a co-owner of the City Fuel Company in Fond du Lac, a retail fuel seller. He operated the company in partnership with his wife until 1952. During that time he was also increasingly active in the Republican Party of Wisconsin, and served six years as chairman of the Fond du Lac County Republican Party.

== Political career ==
He was elected as a delegate to the 1944 Republican National Convention, pledged to support governor Harold Stassen. He supported Stassen as a delegate again at the 1948 convention.

Van Pelt made his first run for public office in 1950, when he ran for U.S. House of Representatives in Wisconsin's 6th congressional district, to succeed Frank Bateman Keefe, who had announced his retirement. He faced a difficult primary against state senator Louis J. Fellenz Jr. Despite two other candidates in the primary, the race was largely seen as a contest between Fellenz and Van Pelt, who were both scions of prominent Fond du Lac families. They had no serious policy disagreements, so attacked each other's qualifications. Van Pelt alleged that Fellenz's absences during the 68th Wisconsin Legislature demonstrated a lack of fidelity to his constituents; Fellenz pointed out that Van Pelt lacked any actual legislative experience. Van Pelt won the primary with 36% of the vote, thanks to strong support in Fond du Lac and Winnebago counties. In the general election he easily defeated Kenneth Kunde of Oshkosh.

He won re-election six times, serving from January 3, 1951, till January 3, 1965. He voted in favor of the Civil Rights Acts of 1957 and 1960, but voted against the Civil Rights Act of 1964 and the 24th Amendment to the U.S. Constitution.

In 1964, he faced a difficult primary challenge from popular young Winnebago County district attorney Jack D. Steinhilber. Steinhilber attacked Van Pelt for a poor attendance record in the 88th Congress, but had no significant policy differences. Van Pelt prevailed in the primary but lost his seat in the Democratic wave election of 1964. He fell 2,587 votes short of union machinist John A. Race.

== Personal life and family ==
William Van Pelt was the fourth of five children born to George and May M. (née Lyon) Van Pelt. George Van Pelt worked as a farmer and factory laborer. William's elder brother Clayton Van Pelt served 15 years as a Wisconsin circuit court judge.

William Van Pelt married twice; his first wife was Sophia Cornelia Schmidt. They married in 1931 and raised two children before Sophia's death in January 1962. That November, Van Pelt married Anne Trimble, who was then working as a clerk at the United States Capitol.

Van Pelt had a quiet retirement after leaving office. He returned to Fond du Lac and resided there and at his lake home in Boulder Junction Wisconsin until his death on June 2, 1996.

== Electoral history ==
=== U.S. House (1950–1964) ===
Year	Election	Date	Elected				Defeated				Total	Plurality
1950	Primary	Sep. 19	William Van Pelt	Republican	15,368	36.28%	Louis J. Fellenz Jr.	Rep.	12,126	28.63%	42,358	3,242
1950	Primary	Sep. 19	William Van Pelt	Republican	15,368	36.28%	Francis L. McElligott	Rep.	8,037	18.97%	42,358	3,242
1950	Primary	Sep. 19	William Van Pelt	Republican	15,368	36.28%	John P. Doherty	Rep.	6,827	16.12%	42,358	3,242
1950	General	Nov. 7	William Van Pelt	Republican	66,289	65.05%	Kenneth Kunde	Dem.	35,618	34.95%	101,908	30,671
1952	General	Nov. 4	William Van Pelt (inc)	Republican	103,464	71.66%	Ralph A. Norem	Dem.	40,910	28.34%	144,374	62,554
1954	General	Nov. 2	William Van Pelt (inc)	Republican	68,653	62.50%	Russell S. Johnson	Dem.	41,191	37.50%	109,844	27,462
1956	General	Nov. 6	William Van Pelt (inc)	Republican	96,783	67.18%	Rudolph J. Ploetz	Dem.	47,277	32.82%	144,062	49,506
1958	General	Nov. 4	William Van Pelt (inc)	Republican	61,490	52.77%	James Megellas	Dem.	55,031	47.23%	116,521	6,459
1960	General	Nov. 8	William Van Pelt (inc)	Republican	91,450	55.80%	James Megellas	Dem.	72,442	44.20%	163,892	19,008
1962	General	Nov. 6	William Van Pelt (inc)	Republican	71,298	59.15%	John A. Race	Dem.	49,238	40.85%	120,538	22,060
1964	Primary	Sep. 8	William Van Pelt (inc)	Republican	24,569	54.12%	Jack D. Steinhilber	Rep.	20,827	45.88%	45,396	3,742
1964	General	Nov. 3	John A. Race	Democratic	84,690	50.77%	William Van Pelt (inc)	Rep.	82,103	49.22%	166,798	2,587

U.S. House of Representatives
Preceded by Frank Bateman Keefe	Member of the U.S. House of Representatives from Wisconsin's 6th congressional district January 3, 1951 - January 3, 1965	Succeeded by John Abner Race
