= United States Congressional Joint Committee on the Investigation of the Pearl Harbor Attack =

American congressional committee, 1945–1946

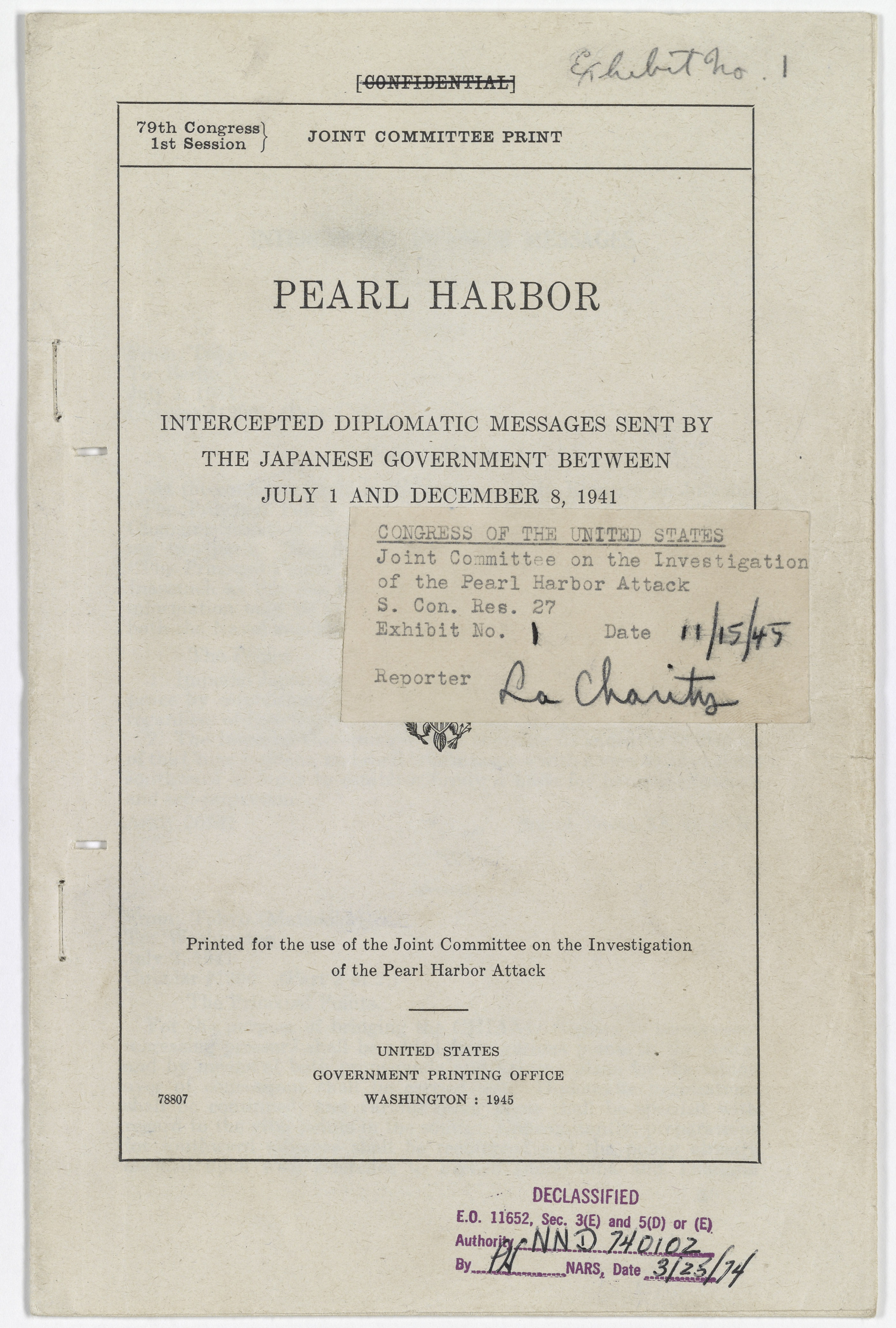
A once-classified report compiled by the Joint Committee containing intercepted diplomatic messages sent by the Japanese Government between July 1 and December 8, 1941

The Joint Committee on the Investigation of the Pearl Harbor Attack, also known as The Pearl Harbor Committee, was a committee of members of the United States Senate and the United States House of Representatives formed during the 79th United States Congress after World War II to investigate the causes of the 1941 attack on Pearl Harbor, and possible preventive measures against future attacks. The resolution for the formation of this committee passed in the Senate on September 6, 1945, and in the House on September 11, 1945. The final report of the committee issued on June 20, 1946.

== Origins ==
Various investigations followed the attack on Pearl Harbor on December 7, 1941, including one ordered by President Franklin D. Roosevelt under the direction of Supreme Court Justice Owen Roberts, and another conducted by the army and navy released by President Harry Truman in August 1945. Congress, however, postponed investigation while World War II was ongoing. On September 6, 1945, four days after the formal surrender of Japan, Senate Majority Leader Alben Barkley presented a Senate resolution urging the creation of a joint investigatory committee to explore "contradictions and inconsistencies" in the preceding reports. The Senate unanimously approved Barkley's Concurrent Resolution 27 the same day, and the House concurred on September 11, creating the Joint Committee on the Investigation of the Pearl Harbor Attack, commonly known as the Pearl Harbor Committee. The resolution authorized a 10-member committee, evenly divided between members of the House of Representatives and the Senate, and chaired by Senator Barkley, to investigate "facts relating to the events and circumstances leading up to or following the attack made by Japanese armed forces upon Pearl Harbor". The committee selected William D. Mitchell, former attorney general under Republican president Herbert Hoover, as its first counsel.

Originally authorized to issue a final report on January 3, 1946, Congress passed a series of resolutions extending the life of the committee to allow members more time to hear witnesses. From November 1945 through May 1946, the committee heard testimony in the Senate Caucus Room from 44 people, including top level military commanders such as Admiral Husband Kimmel and General Walter Short, and former ambassador to Japan Joseph Grew and former secretary of state Cordell Hull. The hearing transcripts filled more than 5,000 printed pages and included some 14,000 pages of printed exhibits.

== Membership ==
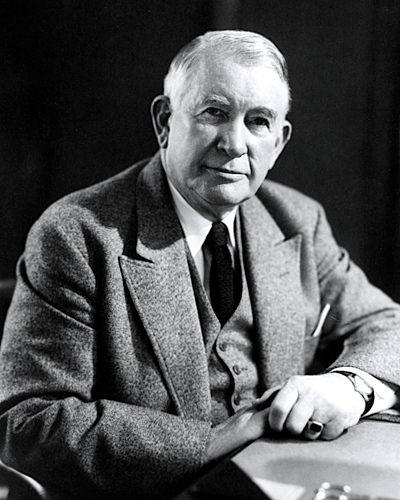
Senator Alben W. Barkley chaired the committee.

The membership of the committee was as follows:

- Chairman: Senator Alben W. Barkley (D-KY)
- Vice Chairman: Representative Jere Cooper (D-TN)
- Committee members:
  - Senator Owen Brewster (R-ME)
  - Representative J. Bayard Clark (D-NC)
  - Senator Homer S. Ferguson (R-MI)
  - Representative Bertrand W. Gearhart (R-CA)
  - Senator Walter F. George (D-GA)
  - Representative Frank Bateman Keefe (R-WI)
  - Senator Scott W. Lucas (D-IL)
  - Representative John W. Murphy (D-PA)

== Investigation ==
On August 28, 1945, President Truman issued an executive order directing several government departments and the joint chiefs of staff "to take such steps as are necessary to prevent release to the public" information related to a U.S. cryptanalysis program to crack Japanese coded transmissions. When Congress formed the Pearl Harbor Committee a few weeks later, members objected to the withholding of information by the executive branch. The president revised the order, directing some individuals to "make available to the Joint Committee on the Investigation of Pearl Harbor Attack … any information in their possession material to the investigation."

Though numerous investigations of the attack preceded the congressional inquiry, some files related to the attack had never been located. Partly to facilitate the search for missing documents and partly because, in the words of one historian, Republicans "did not trust counsel to find and produce all relevant information", Senator Owen Brewster proposed a resolution to authorize individual committee members "in company with a member of the staff, to examine any records deemed to be relevant to the current investigation". The committee voted down Brewster's resolution on a straight party-line vote. Senators Homer Ferguson and Brewster, both members of the Special Committee to Investigate the National Defense Program (also known as the Truman committee) were seasoned investigators. Frustrated by the committee's decision, they appealed to their colleagues from the Senate floor. Senator Brewster complained that committee members had not been "granted the same latitude in the examination of governmental records that was always accorded without question during the history of the Truman committee". The Pearl Harbor investigation, Brewster urged, should pursue new lines of inquiry, rather than "review what had already been put in the record". Senator Ferguson asked, "Are we confined in our investigation only to the matters appearing in the existing official reports?" In reality, the executive branch deluged the committee with documents and exhibits, prompting Senator Brewster to lodge his "regret and protest—at the first public committee hearing about the "premature beginning of this inquiry" noting, "it is just a physical impossibility to go over the [more than 1000 exhibits] prior to this hearing."

Disagreements over committee procedure led, at times, to acrimonious exchanges among senators on the Senate floor. James Tunnell of Delaware denounced Brewster and Ferguson's demands for greater access to material as a partisan plan to "dig up something" that could be used to "besmirch the reputation of the Nation's wartime Commander in Chief [Franklin Roosevelt]". Brewster dismissed Tunnell's "extreme attack" as an inaccurate characterization of his effort to simply "explore the files".

Debates over procedure were driven, at least in part, by Republican concerns that Barkley's long-standing allegiance to President Roosevelt made him incapable of objectively pursuing the Pearl Harbor inquiry. Barkley's close association with the president dated to 1937 when Roosevelt intervened on Barkley's behalf to ensure his election as majority leader and continued until Roosevelt's death on April 12, 1945. As one historian observed, "Barkley accepted his role of presidential flag carrier, but it took him years to regain confidence or to command the loyalty" of members of his own party.

== Outcome ==
The eight members who signed the majority report found that "officers, both in Washington and Hawaii, were fully conscious of the danger from air attack". The Hawaiian commands and the Intelligence and War Plans Divisions of the War and Navy Departments made "errors of judgment and not derelictions of duty". Authors rejected the claim that President Roosevelt and top advisors "tricked, provoked, incited, cajoled, or coerced Japan" into attacking the United States in order to draw the nation into war.

Senators Brewster and Ferguson penned a minority report, dismissing the majority's conclusions as "illogical". "When all the testimony, papers, documents, exhibits, and other evidence duly laid before the Committee are reviewed", they wrote, "it becomes apparent that the record is far from complete".

In the end, the committee left many questions unanswered. "Why, with some of the finest intelligence available in our history", wondered the committee, "why was it possible for a Pearl Harbor to occur?" The final report noted "interdepartmental misunderstanding" which "prejudiced the effectiveness" of intelligence. Though its findings were not conclusive, the committee's recommendations had a lasting effect. The majority report recommended centralizing "operational and intelligence work" and drawing more "clear-cut" lines of responsibility among intelligence agencies. Some of these recommendations became law when Congress passed and the president signed the National Security Act of 1947. The law consolidated the military into a newly formed Department of Defense directed by a secretary of defense. The act also established the Central Intelligence Agency to gather and evaluate intelligence related to national security.

The committee concluded that "[t]he ultimate responsibility for the attack and its results rests upon Japan", and that "the diplomatic policies and actions of the United States provided no justifiable provocation whatever for the attack by Japan on this Nation."

== Public relations ==
The Pearl Harbor investigation never piqued the public interest like other notable Senate inquiries. After four long years of war, a weary nation longed for peace and reconciliation. News media accounts often characterized the committee as politically divided, featuring headlines such as: "Angry Senators Debate on 'Records' of Pearl Harbor".

== Attribution ==
This article incorporates material from the Senate archive on the Joint Committee on the Investigation of the Pearl Harbor Attack, a source in the public domain.
