= William H. Markham =

American politician

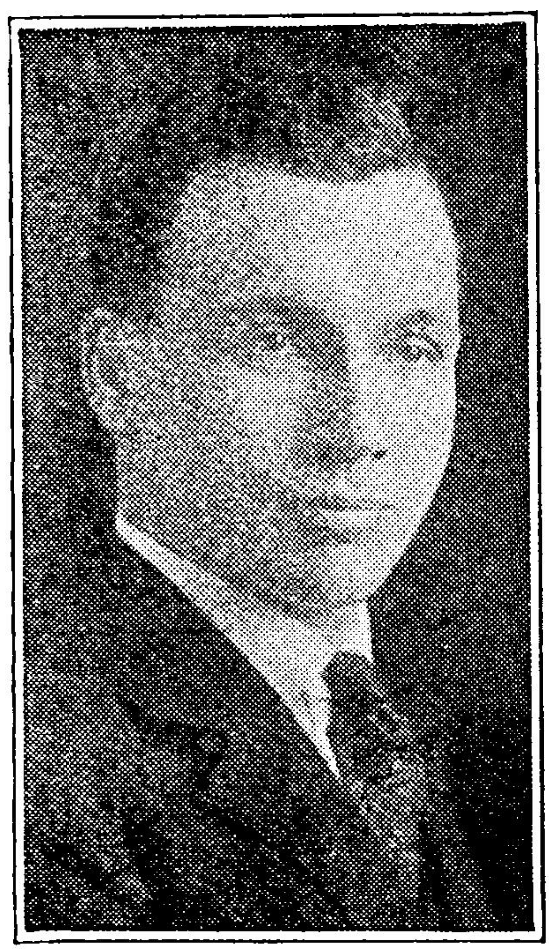
William H. Markham

William H. Markham was a member of the Wisconsin State Senate.

== Biography ==
Markham was born on December 13, 1888, in Independence, Wisconsin. He attended Lawrence College and the University of Minnesota and was later active in the preservation of the Horicon Marsh. Markham died in 1958.

== Career ==
Markham was elected to the Senate in 1926. Previously, he had been an alderman, City Attorney and Mayor of Horicon, Wisconsin. During the United States Senate elections, 1928, Markham was an Independent candidate, losing to incumbent Robert M. La Follette Jr. In 1936, he ran for the Wisconsin Progressive Party nomination for Attorney General of Wisconsin, losing to Orland Steen Loomis. He was then an unsuccessful candidate for Dodge County, Wisconsin Judge in 1938. In 1948, Markham ran for the Republican nomination for Secretary of State of Wisconsin, losing to incumbent Fred R. Zimmerman.
