= Freidorf Roman Catholic Church =

Church in Freidorf, Timișoara, Romania

St. Roch Church
- Rochuskirche
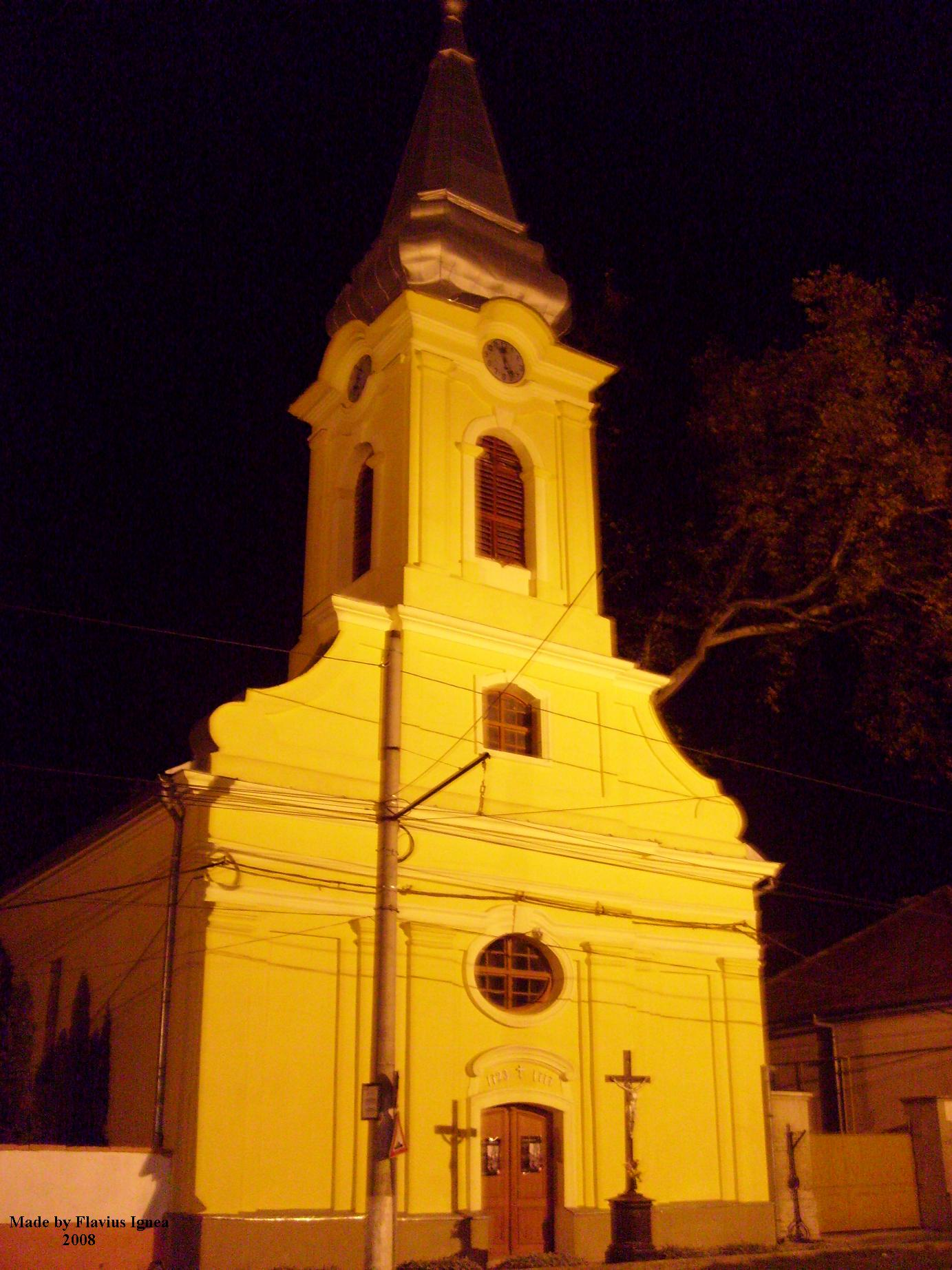

Religion
- Affiliation: Roman Catholic
- Patron: Saint Roch
- Year consecrated: 1777
- Status: Active

Location
- Location: 54 Ioan Slavici Street, Timișoara
- Interactive map of St. Roch Church
- Coordinates: 45°43′27″N 21°10′33″E

Architecture
- Style: Baroque
- Groundbreaking: 1772
- Completed: 1777

Specifications
- Capacity: 150
- Dome: 1

The St. Roch Church (German: Rochuskirche) is a Roman Catholic church in the Freidorf district of Timișoara. The church has 300 believers today, of which 200 are Hungarians, 45 Germans, 40 Romanians, 10 Bulgarians and five Croats (in 1970 there were 2,300 believers, of which 1,800 were Germans). Liturgies are celebrated in three languages: Romanian, Hungarian and German.

Johann Peter Weißmüller, the famous American swimmer and actor known from the Tarzan films, was baptized here.

== History ==
The current brick church succeeds an older wooden one, which had a large hall and whose existence is indicated today by a wooden cross. The parish was founded in 1725 by the residents of the 60 houses in Freidorf at the time. The Brothers of Mercy, whose order was located in the building that is now the ophthalmology clinic, took over spiritual care until 1774. After that, the parish was administered by a Jesuit monk, Pater Joachim Hödl, but, starting with his successor, the parish was administered by the diocesan clergy.

The first Catholic prayer house was built between 1734 and 1736 and functioned both as a church during the weekend and a school over the week. The construction of the current church was started in 1772 and finished in 1777. This church was built in a simple Baroque style, with a bulb-shaped tower, which then, in 1879, was replaced with a helmet-shaped tower, also in Baroque style, which still exists today.

In addition to the church and the parish house, the parish owned two hectares of arable land and the cemetery where there is also a chapel. From the donations of the churchgoers, a metal cross was erected in front of the church.

== Architecture ==
The main altar, in Baroque style, was made in Vienna around the middle of the 19th century and consists of the altar table, the tabernacle, the retable by Christian Guntsch, which depicts the patron saint of the church, Saint Roch, and decorative side elements. The two side altars of the church, as well as the 14 Stations of the Cross on wood painted in relief technique, come from Val Gardena in South Tyrol.

In the rear part of the church there are also a total of seven statues, five of which represent Saint Nepomuk, Saint Theresa, Saint Anthony, Saint Joseph, Jude the Apostle, as well as two statues of the Virgin Mary, a statue of Saint Mary of Lourdes and the statue of Mary Queen of Heaven, all of which are works by unknown local masters. Next to the high altar is the gold-decorated bishop's chair, which was made around the turn of the century and is also the work of a local master.

The church has six windows made of transparent and yellow glass, imitating the Baroque style. The yellow parts of the windows form a cross shape. The stand for the Easter candle is carved from wood and bears the symbols of the four evangelists. The baptismal cupboard, made of veneered wood, is richly decorated with inlays of liturgical motifs and is located on the right side of the church, where it is set into the masonry. The two rows of 10 wooden benches each were also made by a local master and offer 150 seats.

Three chandeliers light up the church, one of which is in Baroque style and two of which are locally produced. The confessional, in neo-classical style, is located in the rear part of the church. The floor in front of the altar as well as the sacrificial altar itself are covered with white marble tiles and are a gift from the Freidorf family Matthias and Katharina Müller in memory of their three deceased children.

During the last renovation, the entire floor was replaced, now with marble and mosaics. At the same time, the church was fitted with central heating, and the picture frames and decorative elements of the altars were restored by Josef Tasi, who also added fresh gold leaf. He also made eight stylised pictures displayed around the church, seven of which depict the sacraments and one of which depicts Musica Sacra. The painting on the church walls is simple, and only two colors dominate the ceiling of the church.

The church is equipped with a relatively small pneumatic organ with five registers from the workshop of the organ builder Carl Leopold Wegenstein, which he built in 1920. According to the visitation records of the Csanád bishop József Lonovics, an organ with eight registers stood in the church between 1835 and 1838.
