= Adam F. Poltl =

American businessman and politician

Adam F. Poltl (February 6, 1891 – January 15, 1969) was an American businessman and politician.

Poltl was born in Szabadfalva (Freidorf), Austria-Hungary (now a district of the city of Timișoara, Romania). He was in the retail business and a poultry breeder. He was also in horticulture. Poltl was president of the chamber of commerce. He served as clerk of the Hartford, Wisconsin Board of Education. Poltl served as Mayor of Hartford from 1930 to 1938, 1944 to 1946, and 1952 to 1953. Poltl also served in the Wisconsin State Assembly, in 1935, on the Wisconsin Progressive Party ticket.
