= Freidorf =

- District of Timișoara
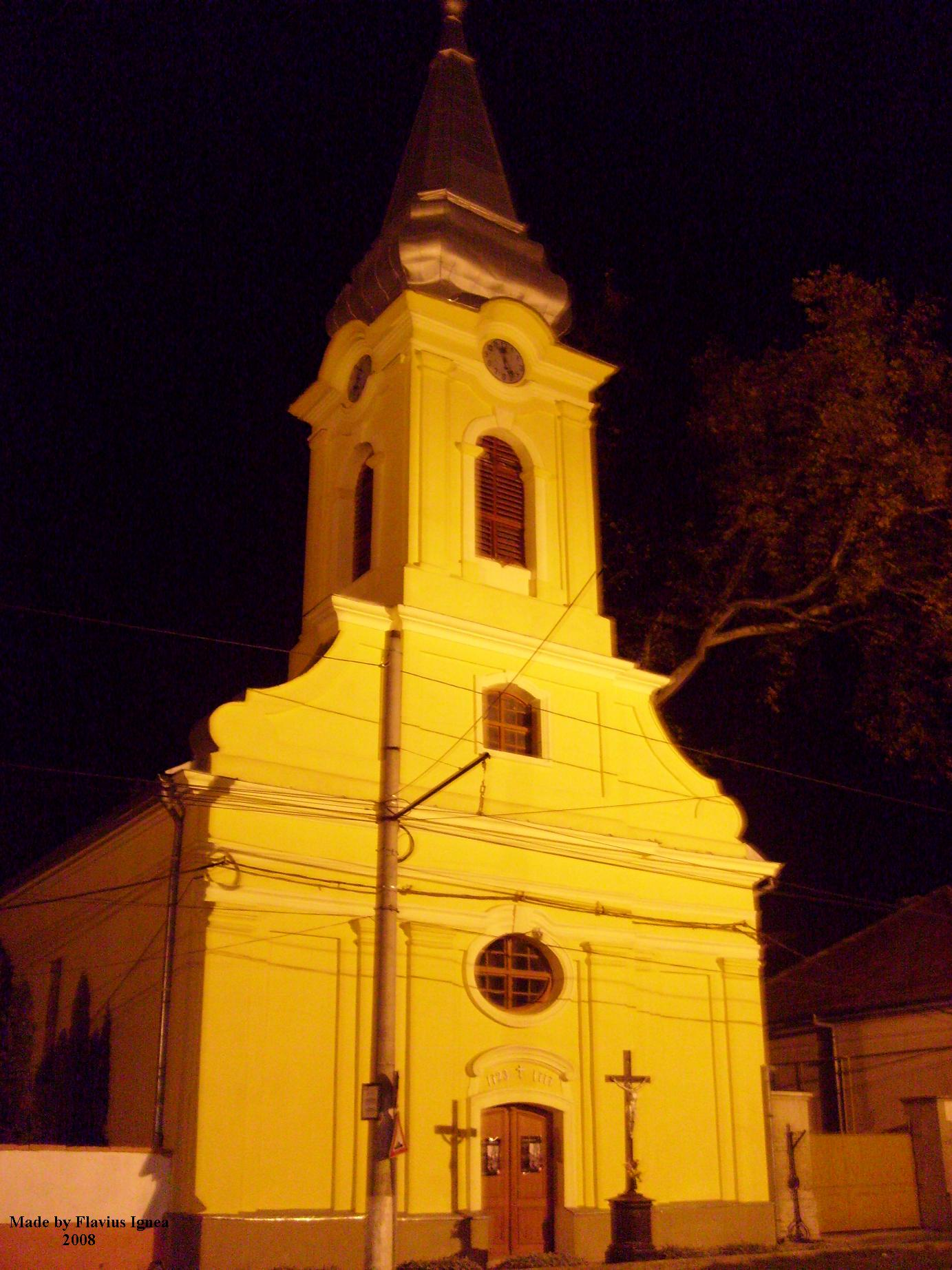
- St. Roch Catholic Church in Freidorf currently Ioan Slavici Street Timisoara
- Interactive map of Freidorf
- Coordinates: 45°43′42″N 21°10′52″E
- Country: Romania
- County: Timiș
- City: Timișoara
- Established: 1723

Area
  - Total: 1.56 km^{2} (0.60 sq mi)

Freidorf (German for "free village"; Hungarian: Szabadfalu; Serbian: Фрајдорф, romanized: Frajdorf) was one of the first German settlements in Temes County in the Banat, Kingdom of Hungary. In 1920, it became part of Romania; since 1950 it is a district of the city of Timișoara, located on the southwest outskirts of the city. Freidorf maintains historic architecture, old Banat Swabian houses, and many green spaces.

== History ==
Traces of Eneolithic habitation have been discovered here since the second half of the 19th century. More recent research has attributed them to the Tiszapolgár and Baden cultures with Coțofeni influences.

According to Hungarian historian Dezső Csánki, there would have been another village here in the Middle Ages, first mentioned as Zabadfalua in 1369, when it was in the possession of a certain Nexa family from Délvidék and the Bésáns of Belinț.

=== German colonization ===
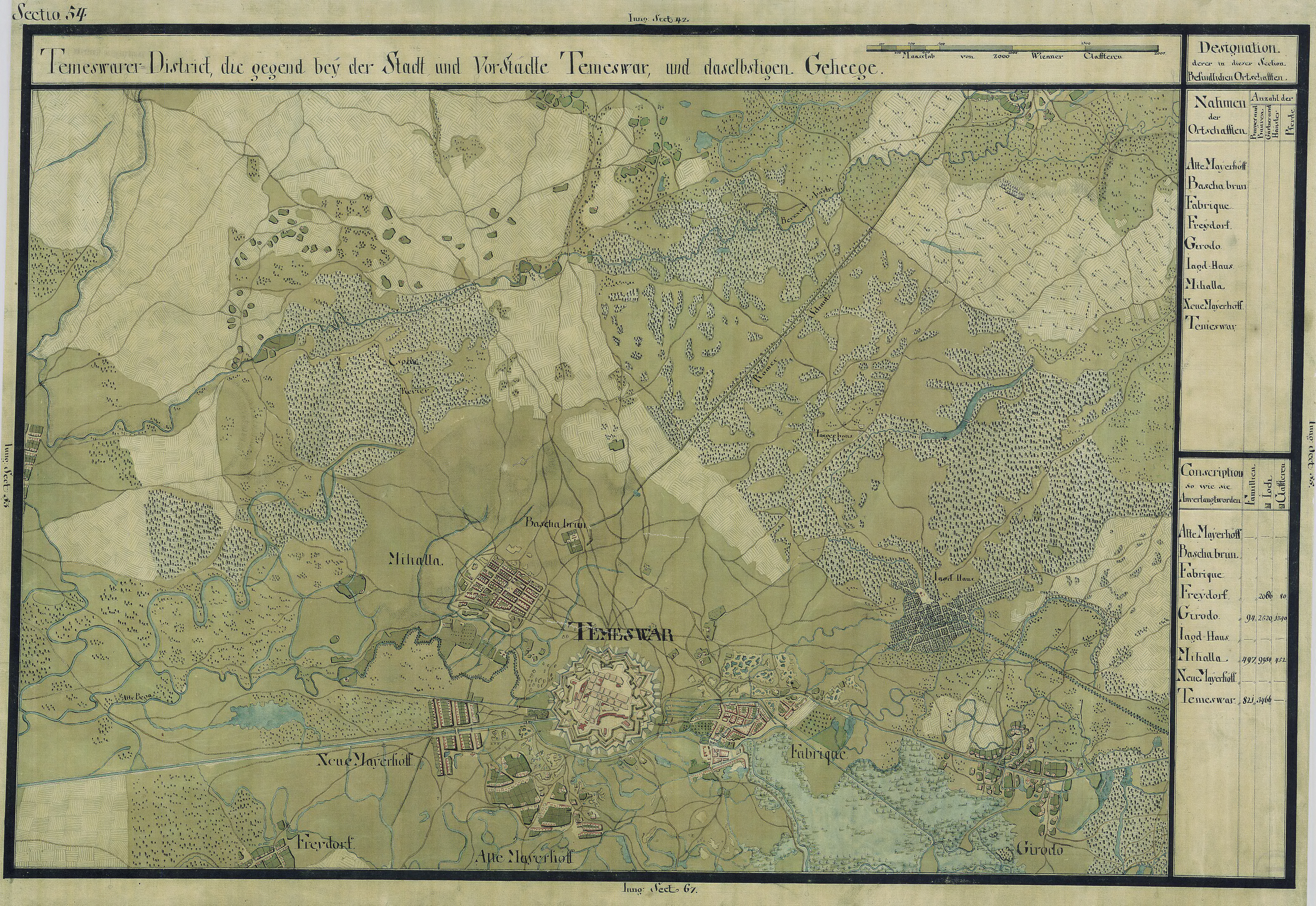
Freidorf in the Josephinian map of Banat, 1769–72

The current Freidorf was originally a German settlement, founded in 1723 and exempt from taxes, which gave it the name Freidorf ("free village" in German). The first settlers came from Alsace, from a village also called Freidorf. They built here a church (1735), a school and a windmill. Initially it was a rather small village, built on the estate of Count Franz Paul von Wallis, commander of the Timișoara Fortress (1716–1729) after the capitulation of the Ottomans following the siege of 1716, with about 500 inhabitants and little arable land. In 1730, Wallis was transferred to Transylvania, on which occasion the tax office bought back the count's estates and Freidorf was obliged to pay taxes.

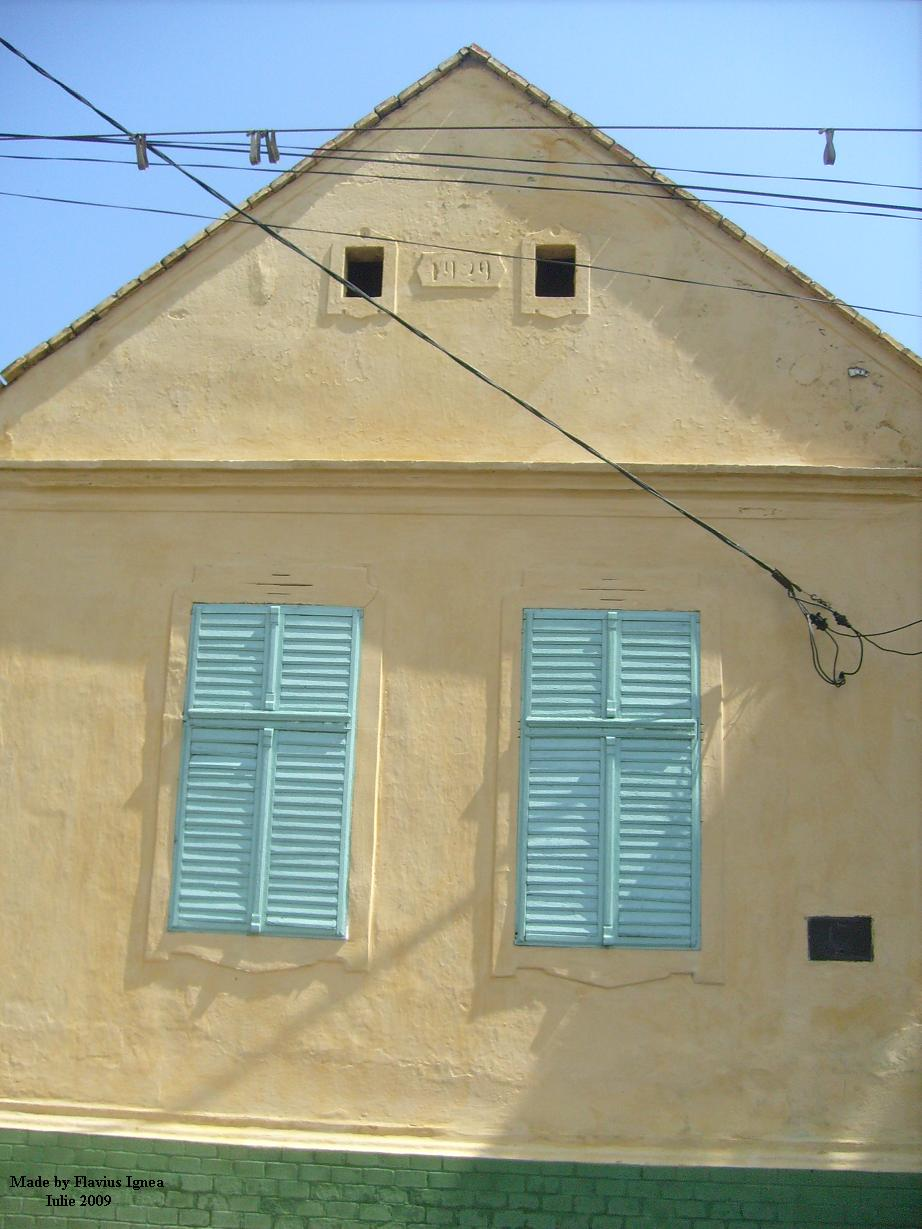
House in Freidorf built in 1929

Although the place was not attractive, being surrounded by swamps, and the living conditions were precarious, the authorities' plans for Freidorf were increasingly ambitious. Colonization continued in 1732, when silk craftsmen from Italy were brought here. A significant enlargement also took place in 1764, under the Temesvár district chief Knoll.

=== 1848 revolution ===
Freidorf also played an important role during the Hungarian Revolution (1848–1849). The city of Timișoara was besieged by Hungarian troops, but its military leadership remained loyal to the Austrian emperor. The leader of the Hungarian army, Józef Bem, set up camp in Freidorf. He settled in the parish house, while his aides stayed in other houses in the village. Among them was Hungarian national poet, Sándor Petőfi, who was promoted to major in the military camp between Timișoara and Freidorf. In 1889, a monument dedicated to Sándor Petőfi was unveiled. The park that exists today bears his name, and every year, on 15 March, hundreds of Hungarians gather to lay wreaths at the monument.

=== Demographic evolution ===
By 1741, 37 families lived in Freidorf. In 1836, the population was decimated by a cholera epidemic, and starting with 1850, Hungarian and Romanian families began to move into the village. They mainly focused on growing vegetables, raising animals and producing bricks, all production being destined for the expanding nearby city.

=== 20th century ===
The initial efforts to annex Freidorf to Timișoara began during the interwar period. In 1928, Freidorf was linked to the city's electricity network, and on 1 December of the same year, Timișoara decided to assume responsibility for the "sanitary and police measures, as well as sewerage and lighting" of the suburban communes located within a 5 km radius, including Freidorf.

The village was officially annexed to Timișoara in 1950. During the communist period, a large industrial platform was built in the area, towards Utvin, which included the Sugar Factory, the Oil Factory and Comtim, and around it several blocks for workers. Also here is the wastewater treatment plant, which was built according to the plans of architect Stan Vidrighin and is still in operation today, since 1912.

== Transport ==
=== Rail transport ===
Rail transport is over a century old in Freidorf. Timișoara–Modoș railway line was inaugurated on 31 July 1897. At that time, it was very important because it connected Timișoara and Zrenjanin, the largest city in Serbian Banat. The first station that Freidorf had (the one put into use in 1897, in the same year as the railway), and which still exists today, is located 340 m southwest of the new station and was built during the 1970s. Currently, the railway that passes through Freidorf is the Timișoara–Cruceni railway (CFR Line 926).

Over time, the station has had several names, depending on the political-historical context. Thus, at the time of the inauguration of the line, the station was called Szabadfalu (this being the official name of the locality at that time). In the interwar period, the station in Freidorf was called Sâmbăta Station, as appears in the Romanian Railways Maps of 1921 and 1938. After World War II, it was known as Freidorf; this name was later changed to the current form – Timișoara West.

=== Shipping ===
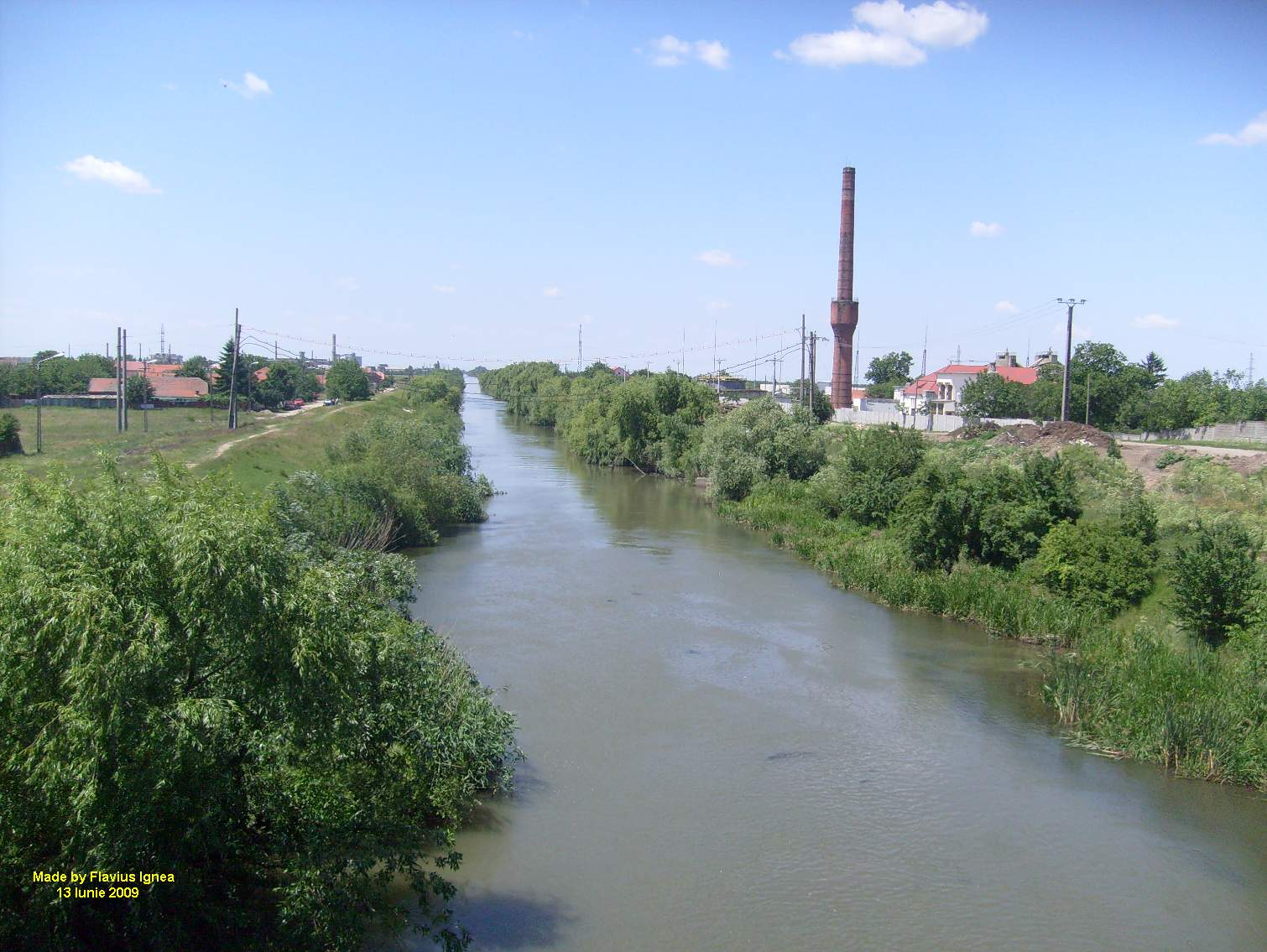
The Bega Canal in Freidorf, seen from the Modoș Bridge

The first record of the Bega Canal section at Freidorf dates back to 1796. The condition of the canal is described by the pontoon corporal, Franz Ulrichsberger, in a report of 20 October 1796, written in Timișoara following an inspection carried out by order of the Banat General Military Command: "From Temeswar to Freidorf you can navigate the canal with full load. From Freidorf to Deutschsanktmichael, the fully loaded vessels cannot pass, only if they will be partially unloaded, the cause of the slightly lower water level being that in several places the canal has up to 86 embankments."

Naval transport, although currently very poorly developed, is still practiced on the Bega Canal. In the past, heavy beet barges came to the canal for the Banat Sugar Factory. The peasants were also brought from the villages on the Bega by various ships to trade the fruits and vegetables in Timișoara. Currently, the works that were started at the Bega Canal, aim to reopen the navigation.

During the interwar period, a small shipyard also operated in Freidorf.

=== Road transport ===
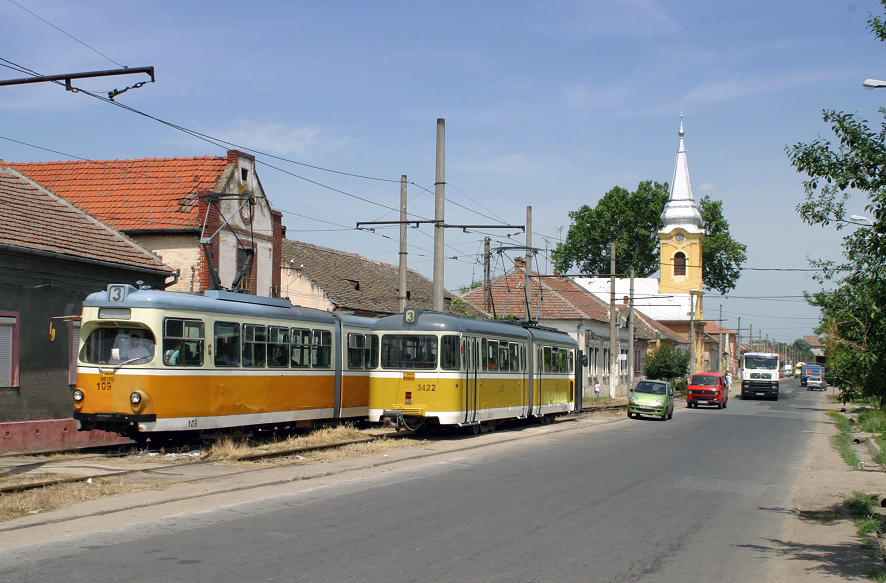
Trams on line 3 in 2006

The car transport is very developed, Freidorf being crossed by the county road 526 that connects the Timișoara with Utvin and Sânmihaiu Român, then continuing to the border with Serbia.

In the past, public transport was provided by tram line 3, which was dismantled in November 2009. Today, Freidorf has the E7 and E7b bus lines.

== Freidorf Industrial Park ==
Freidorf Industrial Park was established in 1999 by a decision of the Local Council. Developed on a total area of 63 ha, the park has attracted over the years companies such as ContiTech, Kromberg & Schubert, ELBA, Smithfield, etc.

== Notable people ==
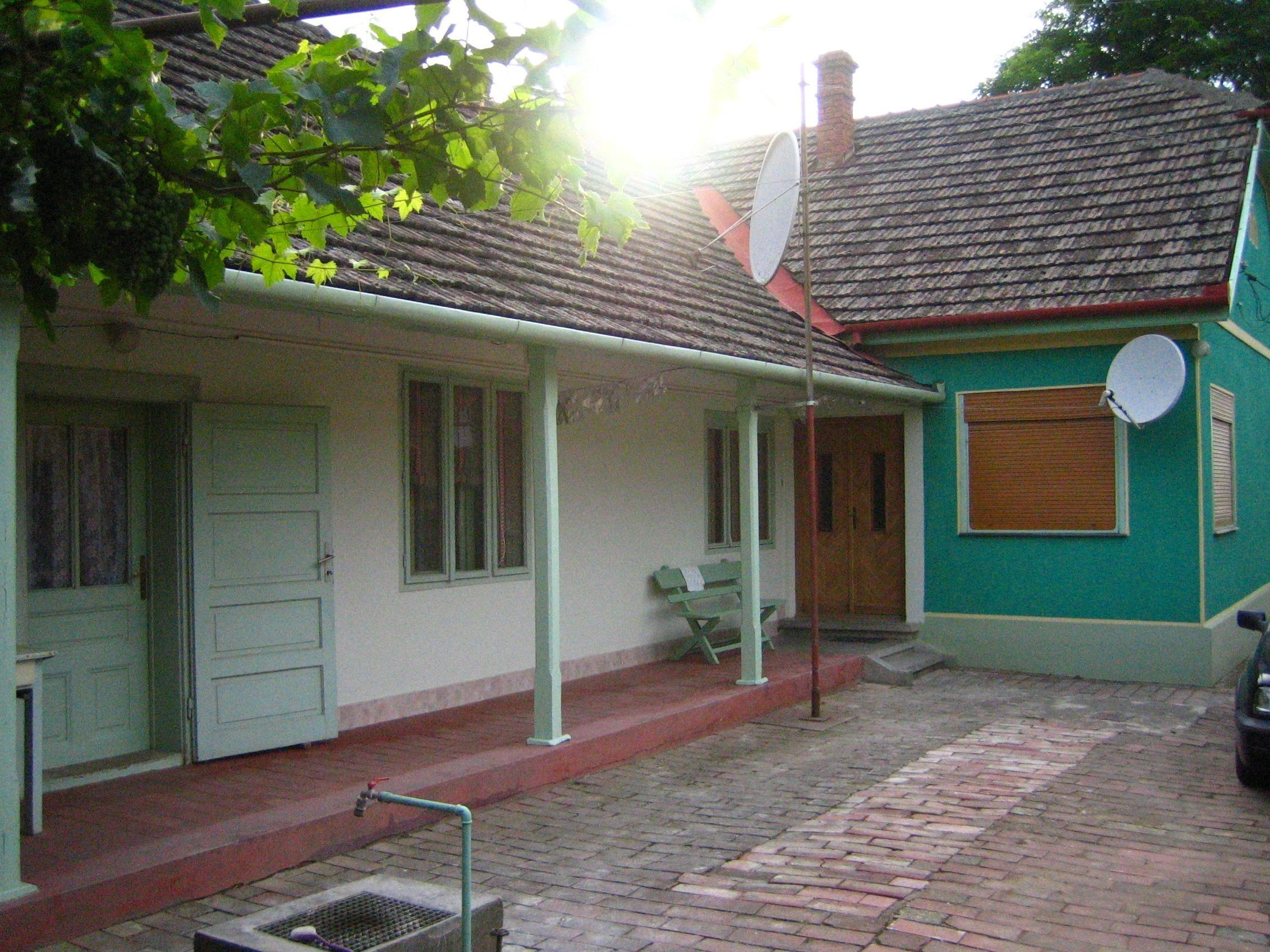
Olympic swimmer and actor Johnny Weissmuller was born here (the original house was demolished in the 1980s) on 2 June 1904.

- Nikolaus Berwanger (1935–1989), writer
- Janos Frecot (b. 1937), cultural historian
- Adam F. Poltl (1891–1969), businessman and politician
- Johnny Weissmuller (1904–1984), swimmer, water polo player, and actor
