= Wisconsin's Fond du Lac County 1st Assembly district =

Former American legislative district

Wisconsin's Fond du Lac County 1st State Assembly district
- Obsolete
- Notes: 1848–1972

Wisconsin's Fond du Lac County 1st Assembly district was a district in the Wisconsin State Assembly for most of the history of the state of Wisconsin, up to the legislative redistricting reforms of 1972 which created the current numbered districts. Located in central Wisconsin, the district was one of the 66 original Assembly districts defined in Article XIV of the Constitution of Wisconsin. The Constitution originally allocated five districts for Fond du Lac County, Wisconsin; this district originally comprised the eastern half of Fond du Lac County, including the city of Fond du Lac.

The district was in use for the first 124 years of Wisconsin's history, from 1848 to 1972.

== List of representatives ==
List of representatives from the Fond du Lac County 1st district
Member	Party	Residence	Term start	Term end	Leg.
District created
Charles Doty	Whig	Fond du Lac	June 5, 1848	January 1, 1849	1st
Morgan Noble	F.S.	Fond du Lac	January 1, 1849	January 6, 1851	2nd 3rd
Charles L. Julius	Dem.	Calumet	January 6, 1851	January 5, 1852	4th
Benjamin F. Moore	Whig	Fond du Lac	January 5, 1852	January 3, 1853	5th
Nicholas M. Donaldson	Whig	Waupun	January 3, 1853	January 1, 1855	6th 7th
George W. Parker	Rep.	Metomen	January 1, 1855	January 5, 1857	8th 9th
Edmund Runals	Rep.	Ripon	January 5, 1857	January 3, 1859	10th 11th
Alvan E. Bovay	Rep.	Ripon	January 3, 1859	January 7, 1861	12th 13th
Charles F. Hammond	Rep.	Ripon	January 7, 1861	January 1, 1863	14th 15th
William Starr	Rep.	Ripon	January 1, 1863	January 2, 1865	16th 17th
D. C. Van Ostrand	Union	Ripon	January 2, 1865	January 1, 1866	18th
Albert M. Skeels	Union	Ripon	January 1, 1866	January 6, 1868	19th 20th
Henry C. Bottum	Rep.	West Rosendale	January 6, 1868	January 3, 1870	21st 22nd
Jeremiah Dobbs	Dem.	Ripon	January 3, 1870	January 2, 1871	23rd
Jehdeiah Bowen	Rep.	Ripon	January 2, 1871	January 1, 1872	24th
Andrew J. Yorty	Rep.	Metomen	January 1, 1872	January 6, 1873	25th
Alonzo A. Loper	Rep.	Ripon	January 6, 1873	January 5, 1874	26th
David Whitton	Ref.	Brandon	January 5, 1874	January 4, 1875	27th
William Plocker	Rep.	Fairwater	January 4, 1875	January 3, 1876	28th
James K. Scribner	Rep.	Eldorado	January 3, 1876	January 1, 1877	29th
William T. Innis	Rep.	West Rosendale	January 1, 1877	January 7, 1878	30th
Uriah Wood	Rep.	Brandon	January 7, 1878	January 6, 1879	31st
Henry C. Bottum	Rep.	West Rosendale	January 6, 1879	January 5, 1880	32nd
William A. Adamson	Rep.	Eldorado	January 5, 1880	January 3, 1881	33rd
James E. Gee	Dem.	Brandon	January 3, 1881	January 2, 1882	34th
Ezekiel Babcock	Rep.	Ripon	January 2, 1882	January 1, 1883	35th
William D. Turner	Rep.	Ripon	January 1, 1883	January 5, 1885	36th
Chester Hazen	Rep.	Springvale	January 5, 1885	January 3, 1887	37th
George H. Ferris	Rep.	Lamartine	January 3, 1887	January 7, 1889	38th
Charles F. Simmons	Rep.	Ripon	January 7, 1889	January 5, 1891	39th
Frank Bowe	Dem.	Rosendale	January 5, 1891	January 2, 1893	40th
Lyman Wellington Thayer	Rep.	Ripon	January 2, 1893	January 7, 1895	41st
Frank L. Bacon	Rep.	Waupun	January 7, 1895	January 4, 1897	42nd
Louie Augustus Lange	Dem.	Fond du Lac	January 4, 1897	January 7, 1901	43rd 44th
Raphael Katz	Dem.	Fond du Lac	January 7, 1901	January 5, 1903	45th
Joseph Carberry	Dem.	Friendship	January 5, 1903	January 2, 1905	46th
Christian Pickart	Dem.	Marshfield	January 2, 1905	January 1, 1917	47th 48th 49th 50th 51st 52nd
Herman Schroeder	Rep.	Empire	January 1, 1917	January 3, 1921	53rd 54th
Joseph Lamb	Rep.	Friendship	January 3, 1921	January 1, 1923	55th
Math Koenigs	Rep.	Fond du Lac	January 1, 1923	January 7, 1929	56th 57th 58th
Carlton W. Mauthe	Rep.	Fond du Lac	January 7, 1929	January 2, 1933	59th 60th
Maurice J. Fitzsimons Jr.	Dem.	Fond du Lac	January 2, 1933	January 6, 1941	61st 62nd 63rd 64th
William J. Nuss	Rep.	Fond du Lac	January 6, 1941	January 6, 1947	65th 66th 67th
Myrton H. Duel	Rep.	Fond du Lac	January 6, 1947	January 1, 1951	68th 69th
Nicholas J. Lesselyoung	Rep.	Fond du Lac	January 1, 1951	January 7, 1957	70th 71st 72nd
Earl F. McEssy	Rep.	Fond du Lac	January 7, 1957	January 1, 1973	73rd 74th 75th 76th 77th 78th 79th 80th
District abolished by 1971 Wisconsin Act 304; Fond du Lac County was divided between the 6th, 52nd, 53rd, 57th, and 72nd Assembly districts The Fond du Lac County 1st district did not have a close analogue in the new map
