= William Plocker =

19th-century American politician

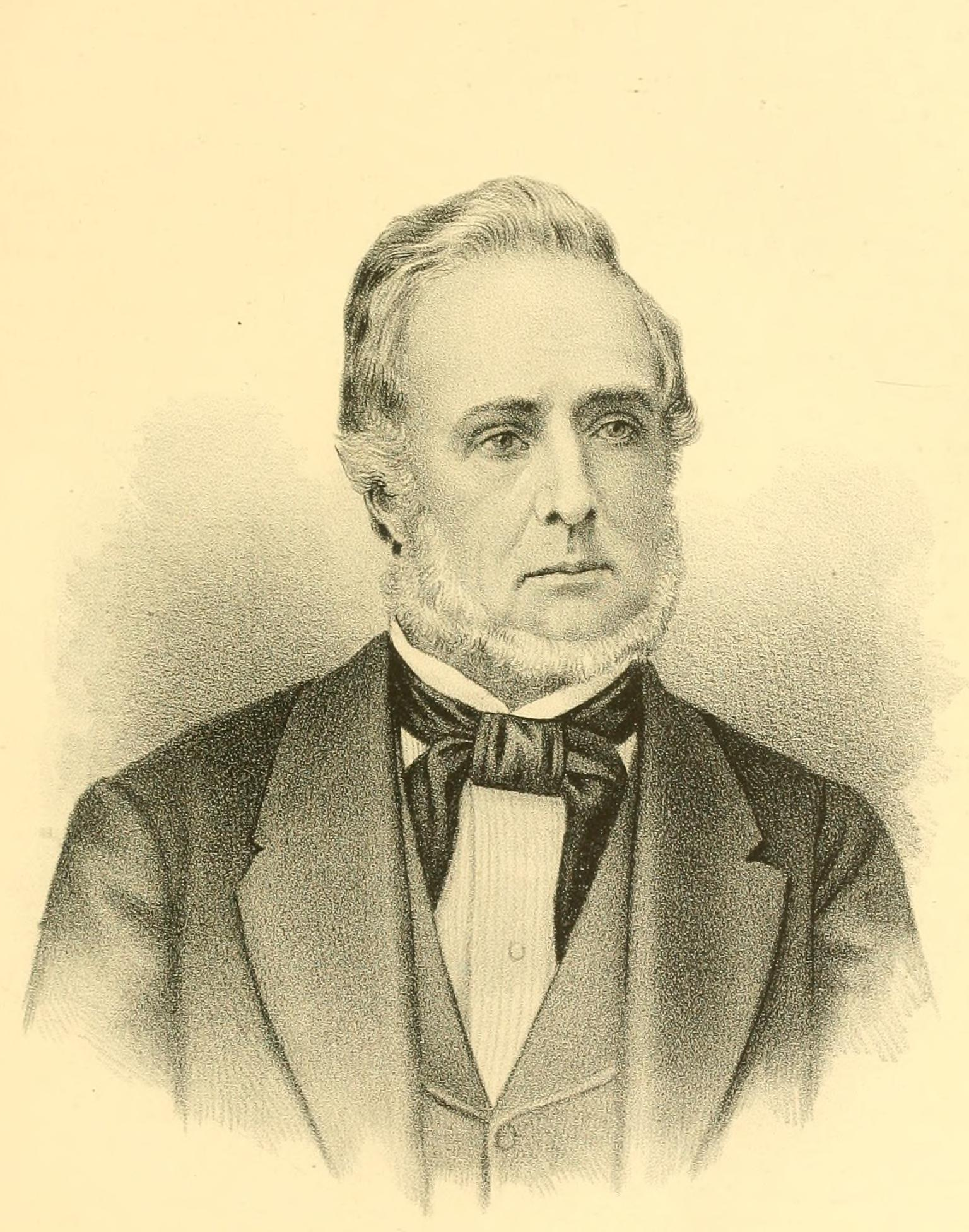
- From The History of Fond du Lac County, Wisconsin (1880)

Member of the Wisconsin State Assembly from the Fond du Lac 1st district
- In office January 4, 1875 – January 3, 1876
- Preceded by: David Whitton
- Succeeded by: James K. Scribner

Chairman of the Board of Supervisors of Fond du Lac County, Wisconsin
- In office April 1858 – April 1859
- Preceded by: John Boyd
- Succeeded by: Joseph Wagner

Personal details
- Born: May 28, 1811 London, England, UK
- Died: December 21, 1878 (aged 67) Boston, Massachusetts, U.S.
- Cause of death: Heart attack
- Resting place: Fairwater Cemetery, Fairwater, Wisconsin
- Party: Republican
- Spouse: none
- Children: none

William Plocker (May 28, 1811 – December 20, 1878) was an English-born Dutch-American immigrant, farmer, politician, and Wisconsin pioneer. He served in the Wisconsin State Assembly, representing Fond du Lac County.

== Biography ==
William Plocker was born in London, England, but raised and educated in Amsterdam, Netherlands. He emigrated at age 16, landing in Boston, Massachusetts, on July 1, 1827.

Two years after arriving in Boston, he moved to Orleans County, New York, where he worked as a farmhand, taught school courses, and clerked for local businesses. He prospered in New York, and was appointed collector of canal tolls at Brockport, New York, in 1839 and 1840, and was named cashier at Buffalo and Albany, New York, for the Western Transportation Company. From 1845 to 1847, he worked aboard the steam ship Wiskonsan, first as clerk and later as master, making a circuit between Buffalo and Chicago. Because of these years of nautical work, he was often referred to as "Captain".

In 1847, he chose to settle in the Wisconsin Territory, and purchased land in the town of Metomen, Wisconsin, near the village of Fairwater, in Fond du Lac County. Within a year of his arrival, he was appointed postmaster at Fairwater.

He was affiliated with the Republican Party from its founding in the 1850s. He served six years on the Fond du Lac County Board of Supervisors in the 1850s and 1860s and was chairman in 1857. He also served on the Metomen town board and was chairman for ten years, from 1854 to 1864. He was elected county supervisor of the poor from 1860 to 1870. In 1874, he was elected to the Wisconsin State Assembly for the 28th Wisconsin Legislature. He represented Fond du Lac County's 1st Assembly district, then comprising much of the western part of the county.

His farm in Metomen was described as one of the best-managed farms in the county. He sold most of his farm in 1875, during his legislative term.

In the last year of his life, he was named the first village president of Brandon, Wisconsin, after it was established in 1878.

He returned to Boston, Massachusetts, later that year to seek medical treatment for a heart condition. He collapsed after attending a concert there and was brought to the home of a doctor, where he died December 20, 1878.

== Personal life and family ==
William Plocker was a son of a Dutch father and English mother. He had several siblings, some of whom emigrated to Wisconsin after him. Plocker never married but his will described intense romantic feelings for a woman whose name was not recorded.

Plocker may have suffered from some form of obsessive–compulsive disorder, as accounts of his life are filled with anecdotes of his eccentric or compulsive behaviors.

He was a meticulous record-keeper and collector, and maintained all of his papers in a careful system. From the time of his departure from Amsterdam until nearly his death, Plocker recorded a comprehensive diary accounting for much of his life, and maintained a scrapbook of useful documents, including a comparison of true and counterfeit bank bills from nearly every bank in Wisconsin. He also kept a separate book of "Anecdotes and Comicalities" where he recorded incidents, stories, jokes, anecdotes, and other interesting facts that he learned throughout his life, often written in patterns of geometric shapes, rather than paragraphs. He collected various other items, he had an extensive collection of coins and stamps, every issue of Harper's Magazine and The Illustrated London News from their inception to his death, over five hundred stereoscopic images of Europe and America, twelve volumes of rare books, and a rare folio-size leather-bound Nuremberg Bible. He also collected nearly a thousand autographs of famous individuals, including Jefferson Davis, Abraham Lincoln, and Millard Fillmore. Many of his items were donated to the Wisconsin Historical Society, including the bible.

Wisconsin State Assembly
Preceded by David Whitton	Member of the Wisconsin State Assembly from the Fond du Lac 1st district January 4, 1875 – January 3, 1876	Succeeded by James K. Scribner
Political offices
Preceded by John Boyd	Chairman of the Board of Supervisors of Fond du Lac County, Wisconsin; April 1857 – April 1858	Succeeded by Joseph Wagner
