= Metomen =

Metomen may refer to:

== Places ==
- Metomen, Wisconsin, town, United States
  - Metomen (community), Wisconsin, unincorporated community, United States
