= Friendship, Wisconsin =

Friendship, Wisconsin is the name of two unrelated places:

- Friendship (town), Wisconsin, Fond du Lac County
- Friendship (village), Wisconsin, Adams County
