= Joseph Carberry (politician) =

American politician (1853-1928)

Member of the Wisconsin State Assembly from the Fond du Lac 1st district
- In office January 5, 1903 – January 2, 1905
- Preceded by: Raphael Katz
- Succeeded by: Christian Pickart

Personal details
- Born: 1853 Friendship, Wisconsin, U.S.
- Died: October 18, 1928 (aged 74–75) Friendship, Wisconsin, U.S.
- Resting place: Saint Charles Cemetery, Fond du Lac, Wisconsin
- Spouse: Martha Reilly (died 1892)
- Children: Clarence J. Carberry^{(b. 1888; died 1973)}; Charles Leo Carberry^{(b. 1890; died 1967)}; Mary C. (Taylor)^{(b. 1895; died 1968)}
- Occupation: Farmer

Joseph Carberry (1853 – October 18, 1928) was an Irish American farmer and Democratic politician. He was a member of the Wisconsin State Assembly, representing Fond du Lac County during the 1903 session.

== Biography ==
Joseph Carberry was born in the town of Friendship, Wisconsin, on his family's farm, known as "Carberry's Corners" near the southeast corner of the township. He received a common school education and, in 1888, he established his own farm in the neighboring town of Empire. He ultimately returned to his family's Friendship homestead in 1892, and cultivated that farm for the rest of his life.

In Friendship, he was elected town clerk for six years and served another six years as chairman of the town board. He also represented his town on the Fond du Lac County board of supervisors.

In 1902, incumbent state representative Raphael Katz died while running for re-election. The Democratic committee in Fond du Lac County selected Carberry as their candidate just a few days before the election. He narrowly prevailed in the general election and represented the district in the Wisconsin State Assembly for the 1903 session, but did not run for re-election in 1904.

He returned to his farm and worked until retiring about 1918. He died on his farm in Friendship in 1928.

== Personal life and family ==
Joseph Carberry was a son of Irish American immigrants Charles Carberry and his wife Mary (née McDebbitt). Charles Carberry served in the 17th Wisconsin Infantry Regiment during the American Civil War.

Joseph Carberry married Martha Reilly, the daughter of another prominent Fond du Lac County farmer. They had at least three children.

== Electoral history ==
=== Wisconsin Assembly (1902) ===
Wisconsin Assembly, Fond du Lac 1st District Election, 1902
Party	Candidate	Votes	%	±%
General Election, November 4, 1902
Democratic	Joseph Carberry	2,667	52.89%	−0.58%
Republican	Anton E. Leonard	2,376	47.11%	
Plurality		291	5.77%	-1.17%
Total votes		5,043	100.0%	-17.26%
Democratic hold				

Wisconsin State Assembly
Preceded by Raphael Katz	Member of the Wisconsin State Assembly from the Fond du Lac 1st district January 5, 1903 – January 2, 1905	Succeeded by Christian Pickart
