= James Scribner =

James Scribner may refer to:

- James K. Scribner (1828–1910), member of the Wisconsin State Assembly
- James M. Scribner (1920–1941), United States Navy sailor
