= William F. Sommerfield =

American politician

William F. Sommerfield (January 19, 1877 – January 31, 1937) was an American businessman and politician.

Born in the town of Metomen, Fond du Lac County, Wisconsin, Sommerfield lived in Oakfield, Wisconsin; he was in the furniture and funeral home business. Sommerfield served as president of the village of Oakfield and was a Republican. He also served on the Fond du Lac County Board of Supervisors. In 1913, Sommerfield served in the Wisconsin State Assembly. Sommerfield died in Oakfield, Wisconsin.
