= John Boyd (Wisconsin State Representative) =

British American immigrant and politician

Member of the Kansas House of Representatives from the 64th district
- In office January 5, 1874 – February 13, 1874
- Preceded by: T. B. Eldridge
- Succeeded by: C. S. Brown

Member of the Wisconsin State Assembly from the Fond du Lac 3rd district
- In office January 1, 1870 – January 1, 1871
- Preceded by: Irenus K. Hamilton
- Succeeded by: Gerrit T. Thorn

Member of the Wisconsin State Assembly from the Fond du Lac 4th district
- In office January 1, 1862 – January 1, 1863
- Preceded by: John W. Hall
- Succeeded by: Samuel O'Hara
- In office January 1, 1860 – January 1, 1861
- Preceded by: O. Hugo Petters
- Succeeded by: John W. Hall
- In office January 1, 1855 – January 1, 1856
- Preceded by: Major Thomas
- Succeeded by: Joseph Wagner

Chairman of the Board of Supervisors of Fond du Lac County, Wisconsin
- In office April 1861 – April 1862
- Preceded by: George W. Sawyer
- Succeeded by: Benjamin F. Moore
- In office April 1857 – April 1858
- Preceded by: Nicholas M. Donaldson
- Succeeded by: William Plocker

Personal details
- Born: May 1, 1824 England, UK
- Died: July 2, 1882 (aged 58) Fond Du Lac, Wisconsin, U.S.
- Party: Greenback (after 1874); Democratic
- Spouse: married
- Children: at least 1
- Parent: Thomas Boyd (father)
- Relatives: Thomas Boyd (brother)
- Education: Trinity College Dublin
- Profession: farmer

John Boyd (May 1, 1824 – July 2, 1882) was an Irish American immigrant, politician, and Wisconsin pioneer. He represented northern Fond du Lac County as a member of the Wisconsin State Assembly for four terms. He later served part of a term in the Kansas House of Representatives, but was unseated due to a dispute over his election.

== Biography ==
John Boyd was born in England on May 1, 1824, and graduated from Trinity College in Dublin, Ireland, in 1843. He emigrated to the United States with his parents and siblings in 1844. The Boyd family settled at Calumet, in the Wisconsin Territory.

Boyd became active with the Democratic Party of Wisconsin and was elected to four terms in the Wisconsin State Assembly from the district comprising northeastern Fond du Lac County. He served in the 1855, 1860, 1862, and 1870 sessions. In addition, he was a member of the Fond du Lac County Board of Supervisors for nine years between 1854 and 1866, and was chairman for 1857 and 1861.

After visiting his brothers-in-law in Kansas in 1871, he moved to Montgomery County, Kansas, with his wife and son, George.

He was elected to the Kansas House of Representatives in 1873, with an apparent margin of victory of just four votes. His Republican opponent, C. S. Brown challenged the results of the election in the Kansas House Committee on Elections, alleging he had identified at least four illegal votes for Boyd. The House ultimately voted to grant the seat to Brown in February 1874, by a narrow vote. He remained involved in Kansas politics and served as an officer of the state Grange and was active in the Greenback movement in the latter half of the 1870s.

His health began to decline about 1880 and he returned to Wisconsin, hoping the environment would improve his health. After a year in Wisconsin, he returned to Kansas, feeling restored. Two months later, he began to fail again until finally, in June 1882, he decided to take another trip to Wisconsin. He died at Fond du Lac, Wisconsin, on July 2, 1882.

== Personal life and family ==
John Boyd was a son of Thomas Boyd (1785–1862) and his wife Ann. Thomas Boyd was an Irishman who served in the British Army, he brought the family to America and purchased land in Calumet and Fond du Lac. John Boyd had several brothers and sisters, many of his brothers also became notable in early Wisconsin—Thomas Boyd served in the State Assembly, Samuel Boyd became a county judge, and Adam Boyd was a prominent real estate dealer and businessman in Fond du Lac.

Wisconsin State Assembly
Preceded by Nicholas M. Donaldson	Member of the Wisconsin State Assembly from the Fond du Lac 4th district January 1, 1855 – January 1, 1856	Succeeded by Joseph Wagner
Preceded by O. Hugo Petters	Member of the Wisconsin State Assembly from the Fond du Lac 4th district January 1, 1860 – January 1, 1861	Succeeded by John W. Hall
Preceded by John W. Hall	Member of the Wisconsin State Assembly from the Fond du Lac 4th district January 1, 1862 – January 1, 1863	Succeeded by Samuel O'Hara
Preceded by Irenus K. Hamilton	Member of the Wisconsin State Assembly from the Fond du Lac 1st district January 1, 1870 – January 1, 1871	Succeeded by Gerrit T. Thorn
Kansas House of Representatives
Preceded by T. B. Eldridge	Member of the Kansas House of Representatives from the 64th district January 5, 1874 – February 13, 1874	Succeeded by C. S. Brown
Political offices
Preceded by Nicholas M. Donaldson	Chairman of the Board of Supervisors of Fond du Lac County, Wisconsin; April 1857 – April 1858	Succeeded by William Plocker
Preceded by George W. Sawyer	Chairman of the Board of Supervisors of Fond du Lac County, Wisconsin; April 1861 – April 1862	Succeeded by Benjamin F. Moore
