= Reeds Corners, Wisconsin =

Coordinates: 43°47′08″N 88°48′18″W

Reeds Corners was a former community in the Town of Metomen, Fond du Lac County, Wisconsin, United States.

== History ==
In 1852, a post office was established in Reeds Corners. In 1857, The "Second Congregational Church of Metomen" was founded. Reeds Corners had stores, shops, the railroad depot, and the post office. Then, in 1873, the railroad depot and post office was moved to the community of Metomen. Reeds Corner was named after a settler: Warren Reed who lived in the area.
