= Robert M. Graham (Wisconsin politician) =

American politician

Robert Malcolm Graham (July 26, 1897 – January 20, 1981) was a member of the Wisconsin State Assembly.

== Biography ==
Graham was born on July 26, 1897 in Brandon, Wisconsin. He attended high school in Warren, St. Croix County, Wisconsin. He died on January 20, 1981, in Phoenix, Arizona.

== Career ==
Graham was elected to the Assembly in 1926. He was a Republican.
