= Lewis Ralph Jones =

American botanist (1864–1945)

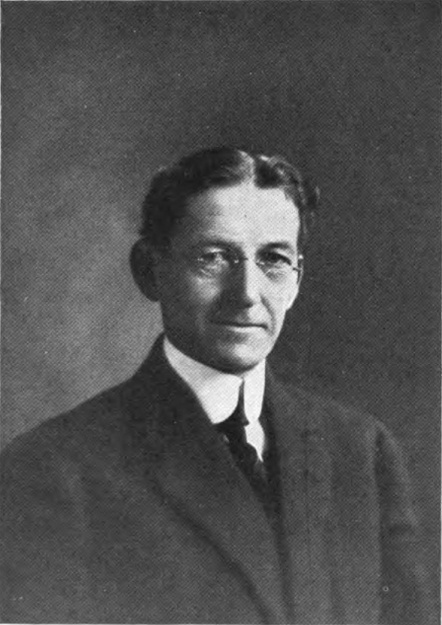
- Born: December 5, 1864; Brandon, Wisconsin, US
- Died: April 1, 1945 (aged 80); Orlando, Florida, US
- Education: University of Michigan
- Known for: Plant pathology research
- Scientific career
- Fields: Botany
- Author abbrev. (botany): L.R.Jones

Lewis Ralph Jones (December 5, 1864 – April 1, 1945) was an American botanist and agricultural biologist.

Jones was born in Brandon, Wisconsin. He was a professor of plant pathology from 1904 to 1935 at the University of Wisconsin. Jones was elected to the United States National Academy of Sciences in 1920 and the American Philosophical Society in 1925. He died in Orlando, Florida.

== Family ==
Jones' second wife was Anna May Clark, a fellow botanist.

The standard author abbreviation L.R.Jones is used to indicate this person as the author when citing a botanical name.
