= Lester Johnson (politician) =

American politician (1901–1975)

Lester Roland Johnson
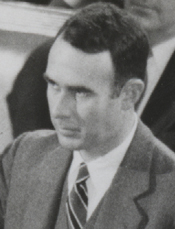
- Johnson in 1954

Member of the U.S. House of Representatives from Wisconsin's 9th district
- In office October 13, 1953 – January 3, 1965
- Preceded by: Merlin Hull
- Succeeded by: Glenn R. Davis

Personal details
- Born: June 16, 1901 Brandon, Wisconsin, U.S.
- Died: July 24, 1975 (aged 74) Augusta, Wisconsin, U.S.
- Party: Democratic
- Education: University of Wisconsin–Madison; University of Wisconsin Law School

Lester Roland Johnson (June 16, 1901 – July 24, 1975) was a U.S. representative from Wisconsin.

== Biography ==
Johnson was born in Brandon, Wisconsin, the son of the politician John E. Johnson. Johnson attended the public schools and Lawrence University from 1919 to 1921. He graduated from the University of Wisconsin–Madison School of Commerce in 1924. He was associated with his father in the lumber, feed, and coal business 1924–1938. He entered the University of Wisconsin Law School in 1938 and graduated in February 1941. He was admitted to the Wisconsin bar and commenced practice in Black River Falls, Wisconsin, the same year. He was Chief clerk of the Wisconsin State Assembly 1935–1939. Johnson served with the state banking commission in 1942. He served as district attorney of Jackson County, Wisconsin 1943–1946 and again in 1953. He served as delegate to the Democratic National Conventions in 1952 and 1960.

Johnson was elected as a member of the Democratic Party to the Eighty-third Congress, by special election, October 13, 1953, to fill the vacancy caused by the death of Merlin Hull. He took over representing Wisconsin's 9th congressional district. He was reelected to the five succeeding Congresses and served from October 13, 1953, to January 3, 1965. He was not a candidate for reelection in 1964 to the Eighty-ninth Congress because 1964 redistricting moved his 9th district from Western Wisconsin to the Milwaukee suburbs. Had he run, Johnson would have faced Congressman Vernon Thomson in the newly configured 3rd district. He died in Augusta, Wisconsin, July 24, 1975. He was buried in Brandon Cemetery, Brandon, Wisconsin.

== Sources ==
- United States Congress. "Lester Johnson (id: J000158)". Biographical Directory of the United States Congress.

U.S. House of Representatives
Preceded by Merlin Hull	Member of the U.S. House of Representatives from Wisconsin's 9th congressional district October 13, 1953 - January 3, 1965	Succeeded by Glenn R. Davis
