= David Whitton (Wisconsin politician) =

American politician

David Whitton (August 4, 1836 – May 13, 1917) was an American produce dealer and lawyer from Brandon, Wisconsin, who spent a single term as a member of the Wisconsin State Assembly from Fond du Lac County. He was elected as a member of the short-lived Wisconsin Reform Party.

== Background ==
Whitton was born August 4, 1836, in Dundee, Scotland, and emigrated to the United States in 1842 with his father (a stonecutter and mason), mother and brother Charles. The family moved to Wisconsin in 1846 and settled in Ashippun, where he received a common school education. In 1856 they moved to Waupun, where David apprenticed as a carpenter and joiner, but found the trade did not suit him, and in 1860 became a produce dealer.

He served while in Waupun as a supervisor and an assessor. In 1866 or 1867 he moved to Brandon, in which place he would repeatedly be elected justice of the peace. He was described as "from boyhood... an active Democrat".

== Elective office ==
He was elected in 1873 as the candidate of Wisconsin's Reform Party, a short-lived coalition of Democrats, reform and Liberal Republicans, and Grangers which in 1873 secured the election for two years of William Robert Taylor as Governor of Wisconsin, as well as electing Whitton and a number of other state legislators. He received 997 votes to 933 for Republican Chester Hazen (Republican incumbent Alonzo A. Loper was not a candidate for re-election). He was appointed to, and chaired, the standing committee on state lands. While his official biography in the 1874 Wisconsin Blue Book lists his party as "Reform", in another table in the same book he was listed as a Democrat ("'Opposition' of all kinds", as the Blue Book put it, held 59 of 100 seats that, to 41 for regular Republicans, and party lines were somewhat fluid). He was not a candidate for re-election in 1874, and was succeeded by Republican William Plocker.

== After the Assembly ==
In April 1877 he was admitted to the bar, and took up practice in Fond du Lac and neighboring counties, while continuing in the produce trade (he owned a grain warehouse in Brandon). In September 1877, he was one of the nine signatories to a petition for the incorporation of Brandon as a village; all the documentation was "left at the office of David Whitton within said territory, where the same may be examined".

In 1881, he was the Democratic nominee for the Wisconsin Senate, District 18, losing with 1593 votes to Republican Edward Colman with 2,491 votes, but ahead of Greenback I. Fay (431 votes) and Prohibitionist J. M. Bonnell (117 votes).

In 1890, he was elected to a two-year term as Sheriff of Fond du Lac County.

== Personal life ==
On January 1, 1862, he married Mary B. Turner of Waukesha County, with whom he would have seven children. He played a leadership role on a state and national level in the Independent Order of Odd Fellows, and was a Royal Arch Mason. In 1913 he relocated to Roberts, Wisconsin, where he died in 1917.
