= Van Dyne, Wisconsin =

Census-designated place in Wisconsin, United States

- Census-designated place
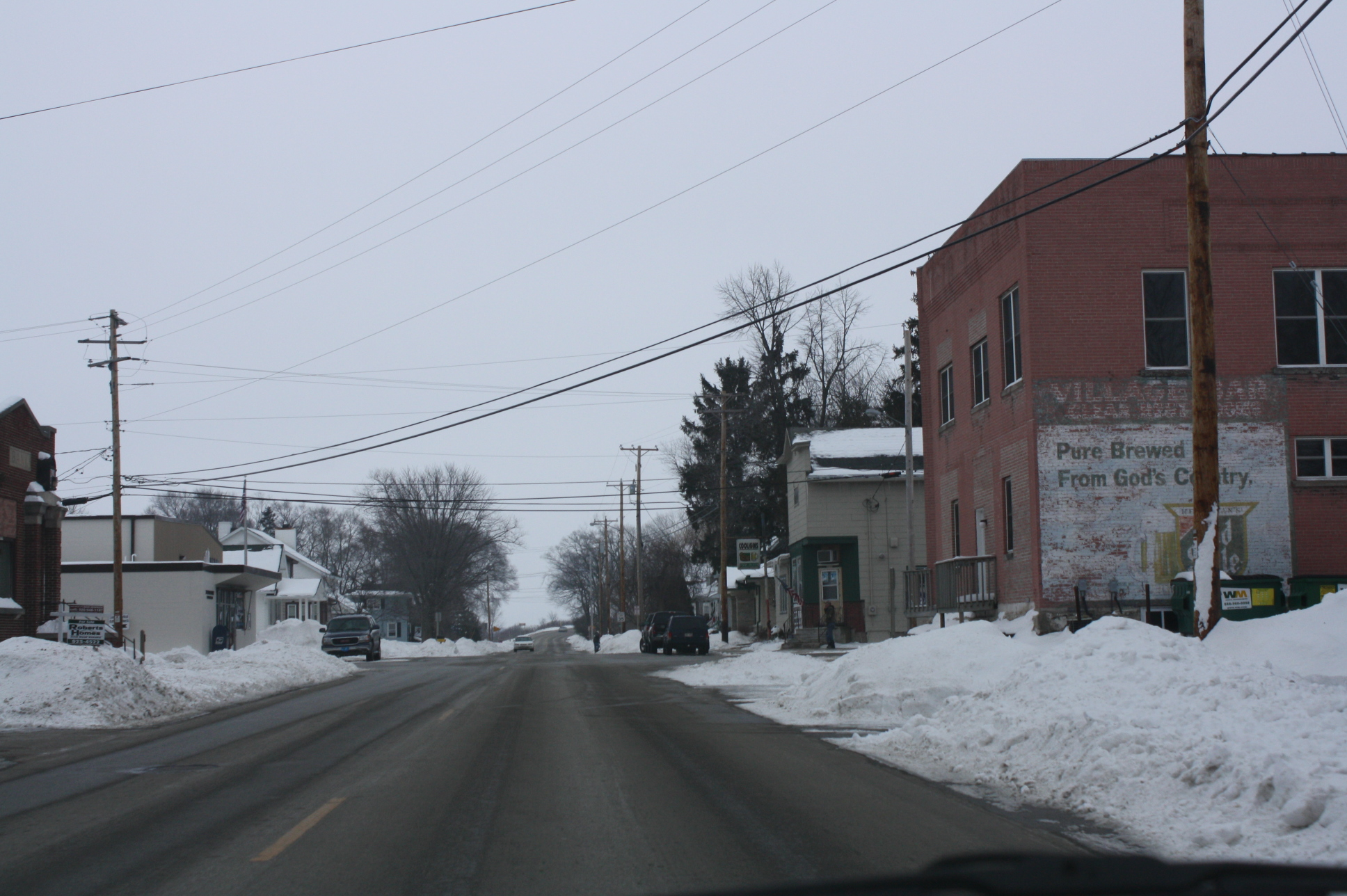
- Looking south at downtown Van Dyne

- Location within Wisconsin
- Coordinates: 43°53′15″N 88°30′15″W
- Country: United States
- State: Wisconsin
- County: Fond du Lac

Area
  - Total: 0.790 sq mi (2.05 km^{2})
  - Land: 0.788 sq mi (2.04 km^{2})
  - Water: 0.002 sq mi (0.0052 km^{2})
- Elevation: 791 ft (241 m)

Population (2020)
  - Total: 292
  - Density: 371/sq mi (143/km^{2})
- Time zone: UTC-6 (Central (CST))
  - Summer (DST): UTC-5 (CDT)
- ZIP Code: 54979
- Area code: 920
- GNIS feature ID: 1584511

Van Dyne is an unincorporated community and census-designated place in the town of Friendship, in Fond du Lac County, Wisconsin, United States. At the 2020 census, its population was 292. The road traveling north-south through the community was part of the Yellowstone Trail and later Wisconsin Highway 175; it is now a county highway.

== History ==
The community was first platted by Daniel Van Duyne in 1866, and was a stop for a railroad between Fond du Lac and Oshkosh. A post office has been operating in Van Dyne since 1866.

== Demographics ==
Historical population
Census	Pop.	Note	%±
2010	279		—
2020	292		4.7%
U.S. Decennial Census

== Images ==
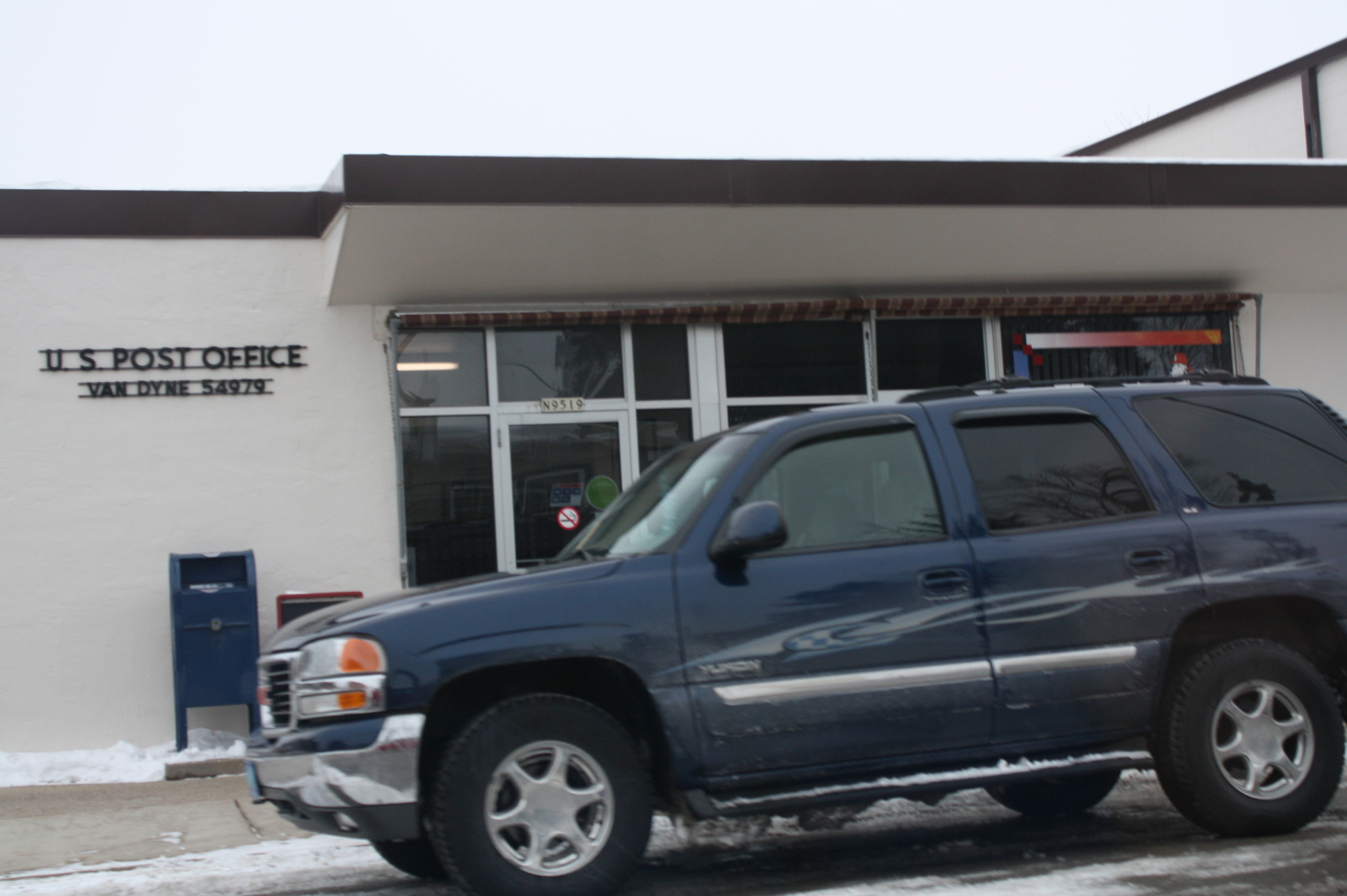
Post office

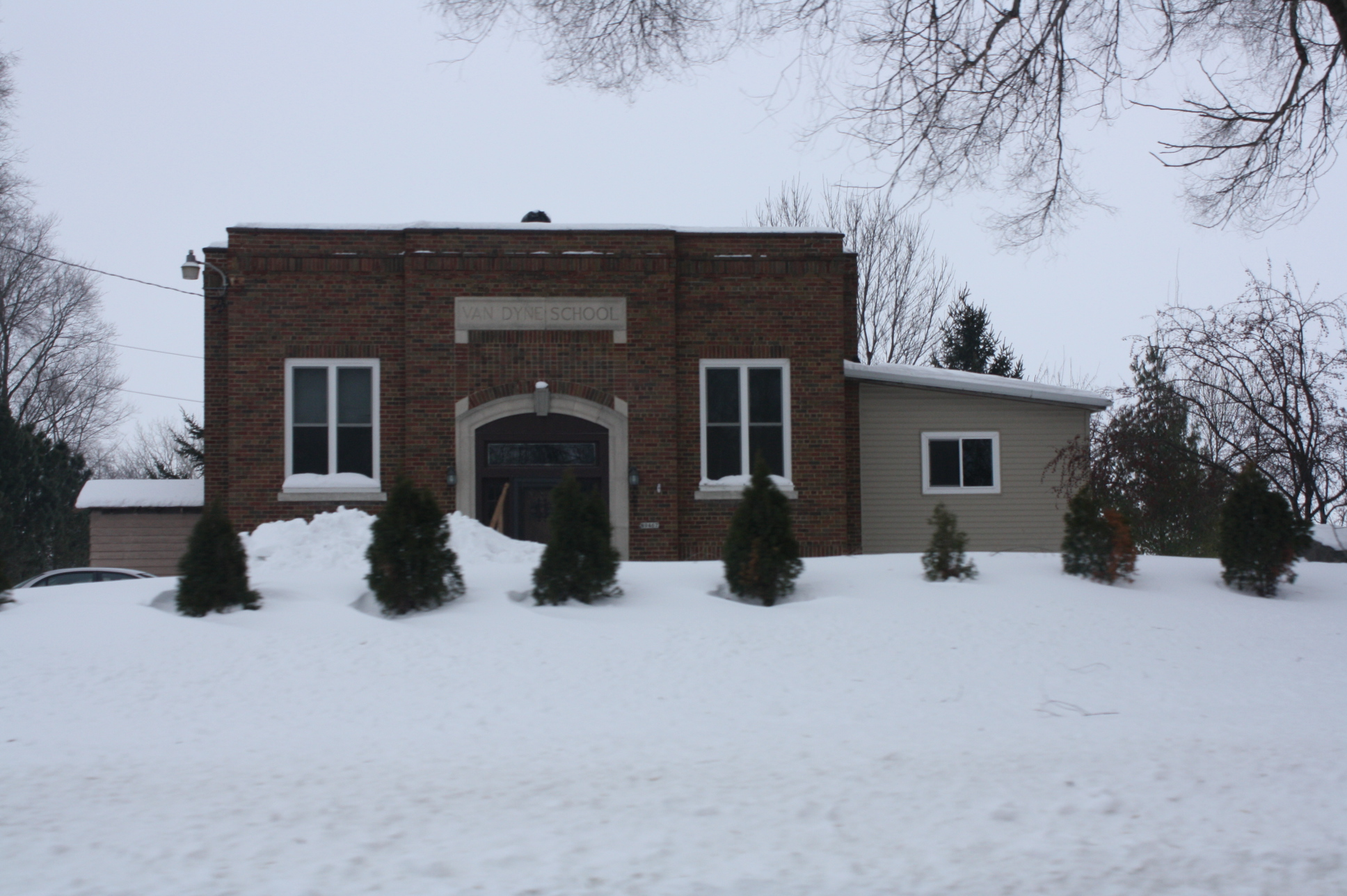
School

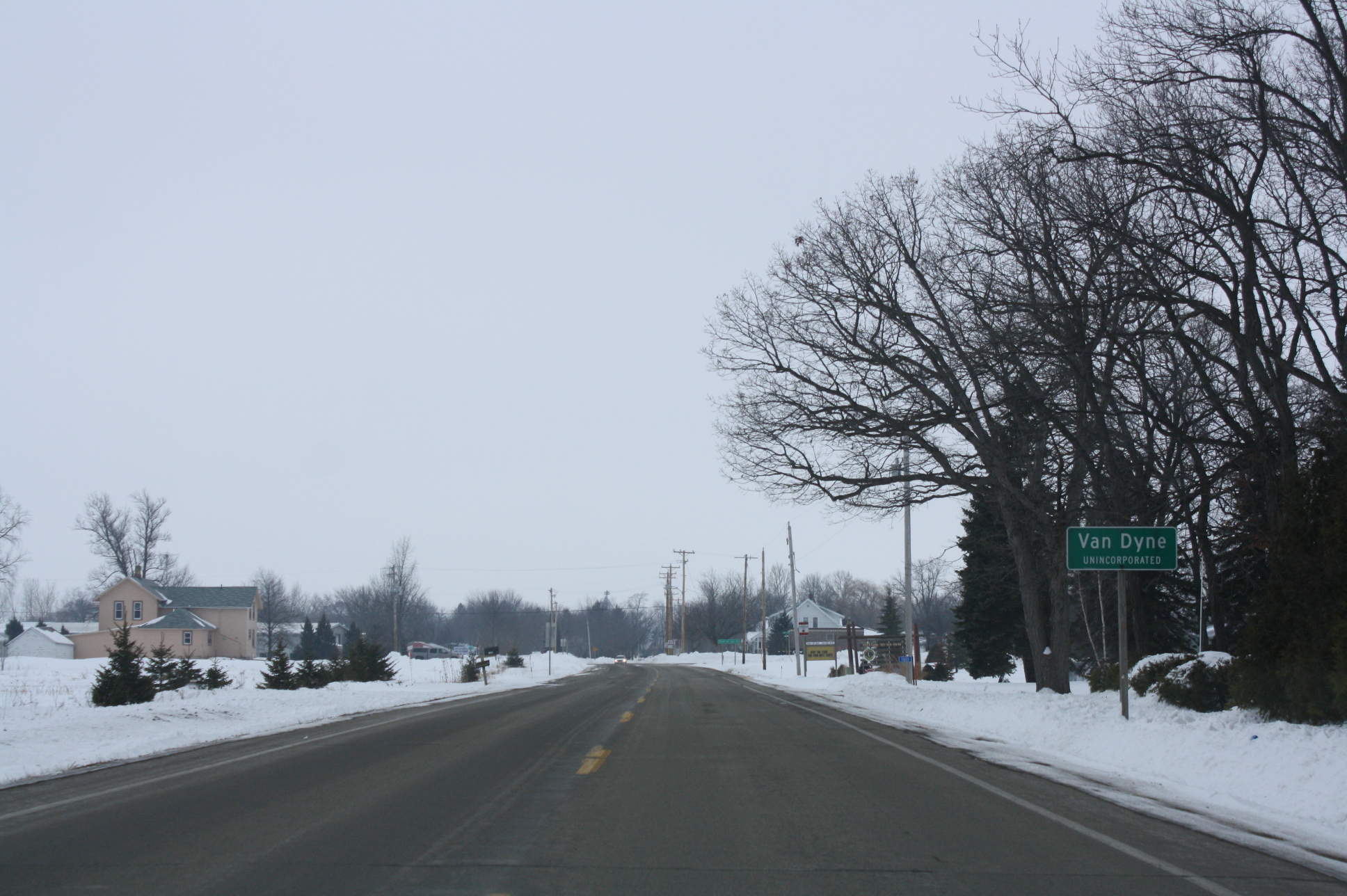
Sign
