= Rens Hemp Company =

American hemp company

Rens Hemp Company was an American hemp company based in Brandon, Wisconsin. The original mill was destroyed by fire in 1920 and rebuilt later the same year. Rens Hemp Company closed in 1958. Prior to its 1958 shutdown, Rens had been the primary provider of hemp rope for the United States Navy and was the last legal hemp producer in the United States following the World Wars
