= John E. Johnson (Brandon) =

American politician

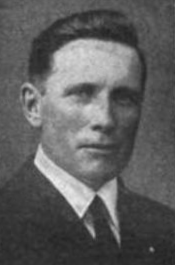

Member of the Wisconsin State Assembly
- In office 1916–1922, 1935

Personal details
- Born: July 5, 1873 Alto, Wisconsin, US
- Died: March 24, 1951 (aged 77) Brandon, Wisconsin, US
- Party: Republican; Progressive
- Children: Lester Johnson

John E. Johnson (July 5, 1873 – March 24, 1951) was a carpenter who served as a member of the Wisconsin State Assembly from Brandon, Wisconsin.

== Biography ==
Johnson was born on July 5, 1873, in Alto, Wisconsin. He attended high school in Brandon, Wisconsin. He was the father of the politician Lester Johnson.

He died at his home in Brandon on March 24, 1951.

== Career ==
Johnson was originally a member of the Assembly from 1916 to 1922. He was again a member during the 1935 session. Other positions Johnson held include member of the County Board of Fond du Lac County, Wisconsin, from 1932 to 1934 and of the Brandon Village Board (similar to city council). He was a Republican and a Progressive.
