= Thomas Boyd (Wisconsin politician) =

19th century American politicians

Member of the Wisconsin State Assembly from the Fond du Lac 4th district
- In office January 2, 1865 – January 1, 1866
- Preceded by: Charles Geisse
- Succeeded by: Joseph Wagner

Personal details
- Born: September 25, 1844 Dublin, Ireland, UK
- Died: November 20, 1915 (aged 71) Pomona, California, U.S.
- Party: Democratic
- Parent: Thomas Boyd (father)
- Relatives: John Boyd (brother)
- Education: Lawrence University
- Occupation: farmer

Thomas Boyd (September 25, 1844 – November 20, 1915) was an Irish American immigrant, farmer, and politician. He served one term in the Wisconsin State Assembly, representing Fond du Lac County.

== Biography ==
Boyd was born near Dublin, Ireland, on September 25, 1844. He emigrated to the United States as an infant and was raised on his family's homestead in Calumet, Wisconsin. He was one of the earliest students at what is now Lawrence University, along with several of his brothers.

Boyd was a member of the Wisconsin State Assembly during the 1865 session. He also served on the Calumet town board. He was a member of the Democratic Party throughout his political career.

Boyd moved to California in 1886 and died at Pomona, California, on November 20, 1915.

== Personal life and family ==
Thomas Boyd was a son of Thomas Boyd (1785–1862) and his wife Ann. Thomas Boyd was an Irishman who served in the British Army, he brought the family to America and purchased land in Calumet and Fond du Lac. The younger Thomas Boyd had several brothers and sisters, many of his brothers also became notable in early Wisconsin—John Boyd served in the State Assembly, Samuel Boyd became a county judge, and Adam Boyd was a prominent real estate dealer and businessman in Fond du Lac.
