= Andrew J. Yorty =

American politician

Andrew Jackson Yorty (January 4, 1832 – February 20, 1886) was an American politician and businessman.

Born in Meadville, Pennsylvania, Yorty moved to the Town of Clinton, Wisconsin Territory in 1844 and then to the Town of Metomen, Wisconsin Territory living in Brandon, Wisconsin. Yorty went to California in 1855 and returned in 1861. He was in the hardware and lumber business. Yorty was chairman of the Metomen Town Board. In 1872, Yorty served in the Wisconsin State Assembly as a Republican. He died in Brandon in 1886.
