= Metomen, Wisconsin =

- Town
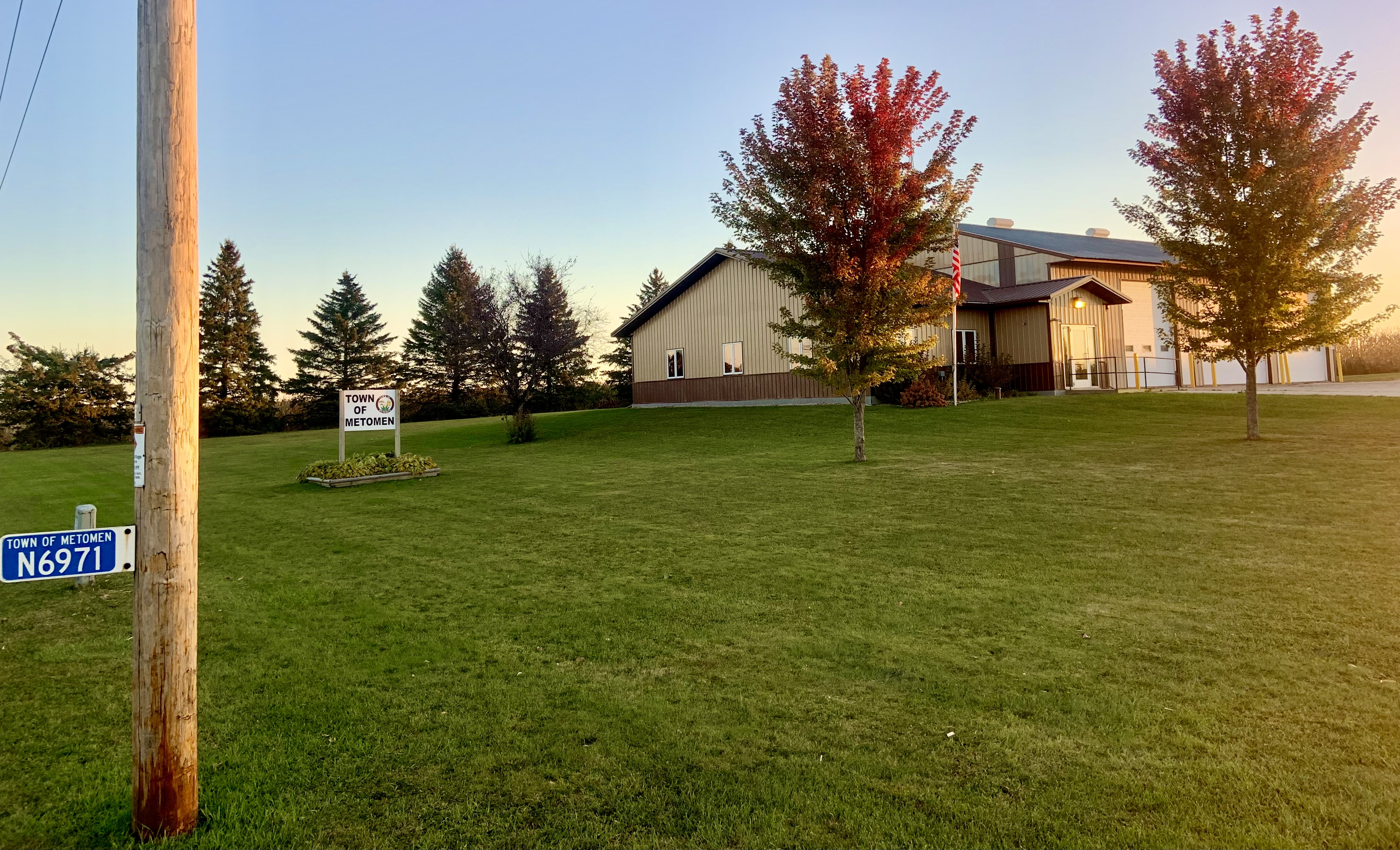
- Town hall

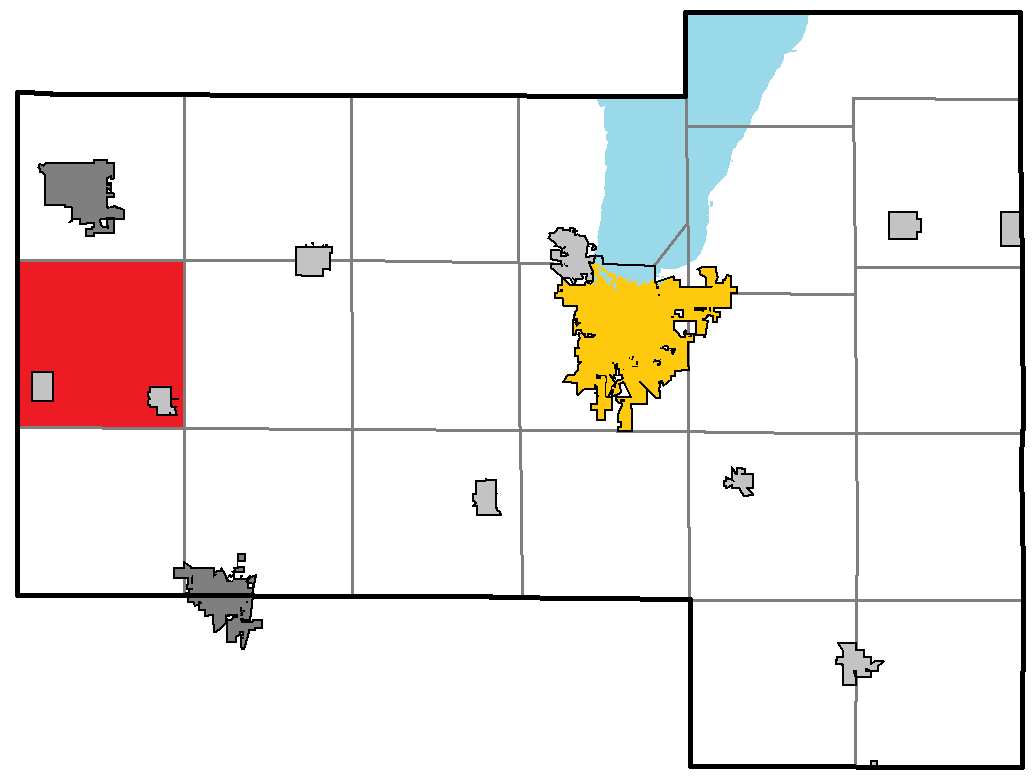
- Location of Metomen, within Fond du Lac County, Wisconsin
- Coordinates: 43°45′38″N 88°49′42″W
- Country: United States
- State: Wisconsin
- County: Fond du Lac

Area
  - Total: 34.6 sq mi (89.7 km^{2})
  - Land: 34.6 sq mi (89.7 km^{2})
  - Water: 0 sq mi (0.0 km^{2})
- Elevation: 1,007 ft (307 m)

Population (2020)
  - Total: 689
  - Density: 19.9/sq mi (7.68/km^{2})
- Time zone: UTC-6 (Central (CST))
  - Summer (DST): UTC-5 (CDT)
- Area code: 920
- FIPS code: 55-51450
- GNIS feature ID: 1583709
- Website: http://www.townofmetomen.com/

Metomen is a town in Fond du Lac County, Wisconsin, United States. The population was 689 at the 2020 census. The villages of Fairwater and Brandon, the unincorporated community of Metomen, and the ghost town of Reeds Corners are also located in the town.

== Geography ==
According to the United States Census Bureau, the town has a total area of 34.6 square miles (89.7 km^{2}), all land.

== Demographics ==
At the 2000 census there were 709 people, 239 households, and 200 families living in the town. The population density was 20.5 people per square mile (7.9/km^{2}). There were 247 housing units at an average density of 7.1 per square mile (2.8/km^{2}). The racial makeup of the town was 98.03% White, 0.56% African American, 0.28% Native American, 0.14% from other races, and 0.99% from two or more races. Hispanic or Latino of any race were 0.99%.

Of the 239 households 41.4% had children under the age of 18 living with them, 76.6% were married couples living together, 5.9% had a female householder with no husband present, and 15.9% were non-families. 13.0% of households were one person and 7.1% were one person aged 65 or older. The average household size was 2.97 and the average family size was 3.23.

The age distribution was 29.9% under the age of 18, 6.5% from 18 to 24, 29.1% from 25 to 44, 21.7% from 45 to 64, and 12.8% 65 or older. The median age was 37 years. For every 100 females, there were 104.3 males. For every 100 females age 18 and over, there were 102.9 males.

The median household income was $44,722 and the median family income was $47,708. Males had a median income of $31,932 versus $23,646 for females. The per capita income for the town was $17,776. About 3.3% of families and 5.3% of the population were below the poverty line, including 4.9% of those under age 18 and 7.5% of those age 65 or over.

== Notable people ==
- William Plocker, businessman, farmer, and politician, lived in the town
- William F. Sommerfield, businessman and legislator, was born in the town
- Andrew J. Yorty, businessman and legislator, lived in the town
