= Metomen (community), Wisconsin =

Metomen, Wisconsin
- Unincorporated community
- Location within Wisconsin Location within the United States
- Coordinates: 43°47′09″N 88°48′20″W
- Country: United States
- State: Wisconsin
- County: Fond du Lac
- Time zone: UTC-6 (Central (CST))
  - Summer (DST): UTC-5 (CDT)
- Area code: 920

Metomen is an unincorporated community in the town of Metomen, Fond du Lac County, Wisconsin, United States. The community is located on Brandon Road.

== History ==
In 1873, the post office and railroad depot were moved to the community of Metomen from Reeds Corners, Wisconsin. Metomen had no businesses, factories, or stores.
