= Joseph Wagner (Wisconsin politician) =

19th century American politician

Member of the Wisconsin Senate from the 20th district
- In office January 1, 1872 – January 3, 1876
- Preceded by: Hiram S. Town
- Succeeded by: Daniel Cavanagh

Member of the Wisconsin State Assembly from the Fond du Lac 6th district
- In office January 2, 1871 – January 1, 1872
- Preceded by: Charles Geisse
- Succeeded by: District abolished
- In office January 7, 1867 – January 4, 1869
- Preceded by: District established
- Succeeded by: Charles Geisse

Member of the Wisconsin State Assembly from the Fond du Lac 4th district
- In office January 1, 1866 – January 7, 1867
- Preceded by: Thomas Boyd
- Succeeded by: Luther H. Cary
- In office January 4, 1858 – January 3, 1859
- Preceded by: Major J. Thomas
- Succeeded by: O. Hugo Petters
- In office January 7, 1856 – January 5, 1857
- Preceded by: John Boyd
- Succeeded by: Major J. Thomas

Personal details
- Born: October 19, 1809 Meckenbeuren, Kingdom of Württemberg
- Died: October 27, 1896 (aged 87) Marshfield, Fond du Lac County, Wisconsin, U.S.
- Resting place: Forest Home Cemetery, Forest, Fond du Lac County, Wisconsin
- Party: Democratic
- Spouses: Mary Dubois (died 1854); Catharine Diederich
- Children: with Mary Dubois; Mary Julia (Schrage)^{(b. 1851; died 1942)}; Theresa Wagner^{(b. 1854; died 1855)}; with Catharine Diederich; Rosa (Updike)^{(b. 1863; died 1946)}; Charlotte Wagner^{(b. 1865; died 1953)}; Lillian (Westerbeck)^{(b. 1868; died 1962)}; Edward Wagner^{(b. 1870; died 1870)}; Albert Edmund Wagner^{(b. 1872; died 1958)}
- Occupation: Farmer, educator

Joseph Wagner (October 19, 1809 – October 27, 1896) was a German American immigrant, educator, and Democratic politician. He was a member of the Wisconsin State Senate for four years and the State Assembly for six years, representing eastern Fond du Lac County.

== Biography ==
Wagner was born on October 19, 1809, in Meckenbeuren, in what is now the state of Baden-Württemberg in southern Germany. At the time of his birth, this area was part of the Kingdom of Württemberg in the Confederation of the Rhine. He was raised and educated in Württemberg, and emigrated to the United States in 1832. He settled first in Troy, New York, where he worked as a school teacher for several years. He moved west to Mount Calvary, Wisconsin, in Fond du Lac County, in 1846.

He became involved in local politics shortly after his arrival in Wisconsin, and became a member of the Democratic Party of Wisconsin. He was elected to the Fond du Lac County board of supervisors in 1848, and ran unsuccessfully for Wisconsin State Assembly in 1851.

He went on to win six terms in the Assembly, serving in the 1856, 1858, 1866, 1867, 1868, and 1871 sessions of the Legislature. Although he represented the district in three different decades and under several different map configurations, his district always comprised his home town, Marshfield, and the four neighboring towns of Calumet, Forest, Taycheedah, and Empire.

In the 1871 redistricting, his district was dissolved as Fond du Lac went from six Assembly districts down to three. But in the same redistricting, the county increased from one Senate district to two. Wagner became the Democratic Party's nominee for Wisconsin State Senate in Fond du Lac's eastern Senate district (the 20th Senate district) and was elected in November, defeating Republican A. T. Germond. He was re-elected in 1873 and retired from politics at the end of that term.

Throughout his political career, he also often served in local offices. He was a member of the town board and county board for many years, and was superintendent of schools in his town.

Wagner died on October 27, 1896, at his home in Marshfield.

== Electoral history ==
=== Wisconsin Assembly (1851) ===
Wisconsin Assembly, Fond du Lac 1st District Election, 1851
Party	Candidate	Votes	%	±%
General Election, November 4, 1851
Whig	Benjamin F. Moore	514	53.15%	
Democratic	Joseph Wagner	453	46.85%	
Plurality		61	6.31%	
Total votes		967	100.0%	
Whig gain from Democratic				

=== Wisconsin Senate (1871, 1873) ===
Wisconsin Senate, 20th District Election, 1871
Party	Candidate	Votes	%	±%
General Election, November 7, 1871
Democratic	Joseph Wagner	1,595	73.40%	+25.73%
Republican	A. T. Germond	578	26.60%	
Plurality		1,017	46.80%	+42.14%
Total votes		2,173	100.0%	-65.43%
Democratic gain from Republican				

Wisconsin Senate, 20th District Election, 1873
Party	Candidate	Votes	%	±%
General Election, November 4, 1873
Democratic	Joseph Wagner (incumbent)	1,073	53.44%	−19.96%
Independent	Andrew Dieringer	935	46.56%	
Plurality		138	6.87%	-39.93%
Total votes		2,008	100.0%	-7.59%
Democratic hold				

Wisconsin State Assembly
Preceded by John Boyd	Member of the Wisconsin State Assembly from the Fond du Lac 4th district January 7, 1856 – January 5, 1857	Succeeded by Major J. Thomas
Preceded by Major J. Thomas	Member of the Wisconsin State Assembly from the Fond du Lac 4th district January 4, 1858 – January 3, 1859	Succeeded by O. Hugo Petters
Preceded by Thomas Boyd	Member of the Wisconsin State Assembly from the Fond du Lac 4th district January 1, 1866 – January 7, 1867	Succeeded by Luther H. Cary
New district created	Member of the Wisconsin State Assembly from the Fond du Lac 6th district January 7, 1867 – January 4, 1869	Succeeded by Charles Geisse
Preceded by Charles Geisse	Member of the Wisconsin State Assembly from the Fond du Lac 6th district January 2, 1871 – January 1, 1872	District abolished
Wisconsin Senate
Preceded by Hiram S. Town	Member of the Wisconsin Senate from the 20th district January 1, 1872 – January 3, 1876	Succeeded by Daniel Cavanagh
