= Nicholas M. Donaldson =

19th century American politician

N. M. Donaldson

Minnesota District Court Judge for the 5th district
- In office December 2, 1857 – December 31, 1871
- Preceded by: Position established
- Succeeded by: Samuel Lord

10th Mayor of Owatonna, Minnesota
- In office April 1876 – April 1877
- Preceded by: T. J. Howe
- Succeeded by: M. A. Fredenburg

Member of the Wisconsin State Assembly
- In office January 3, 1853 – January 1, 1855
- Preceded by: Benjamin F. Moore
- Succeeded by: George Parker
- Constituency: Fond du Lac 1st district
- In office January 5, 1852 – January 3, 1853
- Preceded by: Morris S. Barnett
- Succeeded by: Charles D. Gage
- Constituency: Fond du Lac 2nd district

Chairman of the Board of Supervisors of Fond du Lac County, Wisconsin
- In office April 1856 – April 1857
- Preceded by: Henry Conklin
- Succeeded by: John Boyd
- In office April 1853 – April 1854
- Preceded by: Isaac Brown
- Succeeded by: Peter V. Sang

Prosecuting Attorney for Ashland County, Ohio
- In office May 1846 – December 31, 1846
- Preceded by: Position established
- Succeeded by: John S. Fulton

Personal details
- Born: November 12, 1809 Cambridge, New York, U.S.
- Died: February 7, 1879 (aged 69) Owatonna, Minnesota, U.S.
- Resting place: Forest Hill Cemetery, Owatonna, Minnesota
- Party: Republican; Whig (before 1855)
- Spouses: Jane Stewart (died 1863); Emily Strong (m. 1865–1879)
- Children: Mary R. Donaldson^{(died 1927)}
- Profession: lawyer

Nicholas Mills Donaldson (November 12, 1809 – February 7, 1879) was an American lawyer, judge, and pioneer of Wisconsin and Minnesota. He was a member of the Wisconsin State Assembly for three terms, representing Fond du Lac County, and served fourteen years as a Minnesota district court judge. He was also the 10th mayor of Owatonna, Minnesota, and the first prosecuting attorney of Ashland County, Ohio.

== Biography ==
Nicholas Donaldson was born in Cambridge, New York, in Washington County, in November 1809. He was raised and educated on his father's farm until he went to work as a clerk in the town of Argyle, New York, at age 18. He then completed his education at the Salem Academy. After graduating, he worked summers as a farmhand and taught school in the winters.

In 1840, he moved west to Hayesville, Ohio. He continued to teach school in Ohio while studying law under attorney Thomas W. Bartley—later a justice of the Ohio Supreme Court and the 17th governor of Ohio. He was admitted to the bar in 1843 and opened a law office in Mansfield, Ohio. When Ashland County, Ohio, was created, he moved to Loudonville, Ohio, and was elected the first prosecuting attorney for the county.

He moved to Wisconsin in 1849, and settled at Waupun, in Fond du Lac County. He was elected to the Fond du Lac County Board of Supervisors for four terms in the 1850s, and was chairman for 1853 and 1856. In addition, he was a founder and first president of the Fond du Lac Fire Insurance Company, and worked as deputy warden at the Waupun State Prison.

He was a member of the Whig Party, and was elected to three consecutive terms in the Wisconsin State Assembly, representing two different Fond du Lac County Assembly districts from 1852 through 1854. He became a member of the Republican Party after that party was organized in 1854.

In the Fall of 1856, Donaldson left Wisconsin and relocated to Owatonna in the Minnesota Territory. Concurrent with the referendum to adopt the Minnesota Constitution in October 1857, he was elected Minnesota district court judge for the 5th judicial district. He was re-elected in 1864, serving through the end of 1871. After retiring from the judiciary, he served as a city justice, city alderman, and was elected mayor of Owatonna in 1876.

He died at his home in Owatonna on February 7, 1879, after an illness of several days.

Wisconsin State Assembly
| Preceded by Morris S. Barnett | Member of the Wisconsin State Assembly from the Fond du Lac 2nd district January 5, 1852 – January 3, 1853 | Succeeded by Charles D. Gage |
| Preceded by Benjamin F. Moore | Member of the Wisconsin State Assembly from the Fond du Lac 1st district January 3, 1853 – January 2, 1854 | Succeeded by Edward Boener |
| Preceded by Querin Loehr | Member of the Wisconsin State Assembly from the Fond du Lac 4th district January 2, 1854 – January 1, 1855 | Succeeded by John Boyd |
Political offices
| Preceded by Isaac Brown | Chairman of the Board of Supervisors of Fond du Lac County, Wisconsin; April 1853 – April 1854 | Succeeded by Peter V. Sang |
| Preceded by Henry Conklin | Chairman of the Board of Supervisors of Fond du Lac County, Wisconsin; April 1856 – April 1857 | Succeeded by John Boyd |
| Preceded by T. J. Howe | Mayor of Owatonna, Minnesota; April 1876 – April 1877 | Succeeded by M. A. Fredenburg |
Legal offices
| New county government | Prosecuting Attorney for Ashland County, Ohio; May 1846 – December 31, 1846 | Succeeded by John S. Fulton |
| New state government | Minnesota District Court Judge for the 5th district December 2, 1857 – December 31, 1871 | Succeeded by Samuel Lord |
