= Fairwater, Wisconsin =

- Village
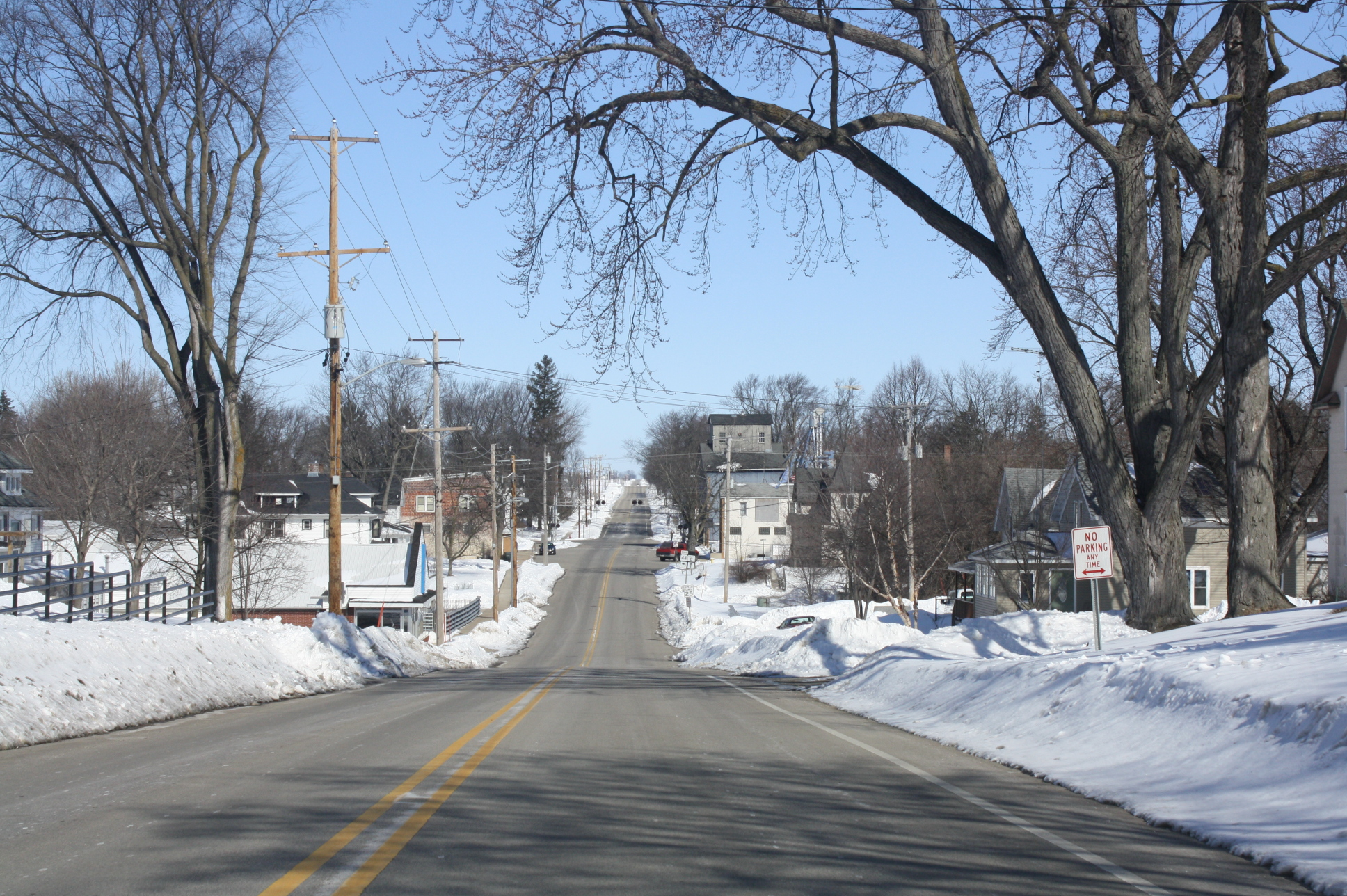
- Panorama looking north on WIS 44

- Location of Fairwater in Fond du Lac County, Wisconsin.
- Coordinates: 43°44′28″N 88°52′8″W
- Country: United States
- State: Wisconsin
- County: Fond du Lac

Area
  - Total: 0.75 sq mi (1.95 km^{2})
  - Land: 0.73 sq mi (1.90 km^{2})
  - Water: 0.019 sq mi (0.05 km^{2})
- Elevation: 948 ft (289 m)

Population (2020)
  - Total: 346
  - Density: 474/sq mi (183/km^{2})
- Time zone: UTC-6 (Central (CST))
  - Summer (DST): UTC-5 (CDT)
- Area code: 920
- FIPS code: 55-25075
- GNIS feature ID: 1564827
- Website: www.villageoffairwater.com

Fairwater is a village in Fond du Lac County, Wisconsin, United States. The population was 346 at the 2020 census. The town of Metomen surrounds the village.

== History ==
The community was founded around the water power of the Grand River in 1848 and was incorporated in 1921. The town prospered under a booming hemp economy spurred by the need for strong rope during World War I. Hemp brought direct income to Fairwater farmers, factory workers and the owners of the Fairwater Hemp Company. An efficient, eco-friendly production process used unwanted parts of the hemp plant to fuel the factory's steam power system. The Fairwater Hemp Company closed in 1931.

== Geography ==
Fairwater is located at 43°44′28″N 88°52′8″W (43.741047, -88.868887).

According to the United States Census Bureau, the village has a total area of 0.76 square miles (1.97 km^{2}), of which 0.74 square miles (1.92 km^{2}) is land and 0.02 square miles (0.05 km^{2}) is water.

== Demographics ==
Historical population
Census	Pop.	Note	%±
1930	301		—
1940	293		−2.7%
1950	311		6.1%
1960	330		6.1%
1970	373		13.0%
1980	310		−16.9%
1990	302		−2.6%
2000	350		15.9%
2010	371		6.0%
2020	346		−6.7%
U.S. Decennial Census

=== 2020 ===
As of the census of 2020, there were 346 people, and 131 households in the village. The population density was 474.0 inhabitants per square mile (183.0/km^{2}). There were 159 housing units at an average density of 217.8 per square mile (84.1/km^{2}). The racial makeup of the village was 96.2% White, 0.9% Black or African American, 0.0% Native American, 0.0% Asian, 1.2% from other races, and 1.7% from two or more races. Hispanic or Latino of any race were 2.9% of the population.

=== 2010 census ===
As of the census of 2010, there were 371 people, 152 households, and 108 families living in the village. The population density was 501.4 inhabitants per square mile (193.6/km^{2}). There were 160 housing units at an average density of 216.2 per square mile (83.5/km^{2}). The racial makeup of the village was 95.1% White, 0.8% African American, 0.5% Native American, 0.3% Asian, and 3.2% from other races. Hispanic or Latino of any race were 6.5% of the population.

There were 152 households, of which 30.3% had children under the age of 18 living with them, 61.8% were married couples living together, 5.9% had a female householder with no husband present, 3.3% had a male householder with no wife present, and 28.9% were non-families. 25.0% of all households were made up of individuals, and 9.9% had someone living alone who was 65 years of age or older. The average household size was 2.44 and the average family size was 2.90.

The median age in the village was 38.9 years. 23.5% of residents were under the age of 18; 6.9% were between the ages of 18 and 24; 28.3% were from 25 to 44; 26.9% were from 45 to 64; and 14.3% were 65 years of age or older. The gender makeup of the village was 50.7% male and 49.3% female.

=== 2000 census ===
As of the census of 2000, there were 350 people, 139 households, and 104 families living in the village. The population density was 470.8 people per square mile (182.6/km^{2}). There were 142 housing units at an average density of 191.0 per square mile (74.1/km^{2}). The racial makeup of the village was 99.43% White, and 0.57% from two or more races.

There were 139 households, out of which 33.1% had children under the age of 18 living with them, 67.6% were married couples living together, 7.2% had a female householder with no husband present, and 24.5% were non-families. 21.6% of all households were made up of individuals, and 10.1% had someone living alone who was 65 years of age or older. The average household size was 2.52 and the average family size was 2.94.

In the village, the population was spread out, with 24.0% under the age of 18, 7.7% from 18 to 24, 31.4% from 25 to 44, 21.1% from 45 to 64, and 15.7% who were 65 years of age or older. The median age was 38 years. For every 100 females, there were 100.0 males. For every 100 females age 18 and over, there were 98.5 males.

The median income for a household in the village was $105,292, and the median income for a family was $51,250. Males had a median income of $36,875 versus $23,125 for females. The per capita income for the village was $19,281. About 3.7% of families and 3.6% of the population were below the poverty line, including 5.1% of those under age 18 and 5.8% of those age 65 or over.

== Images ==
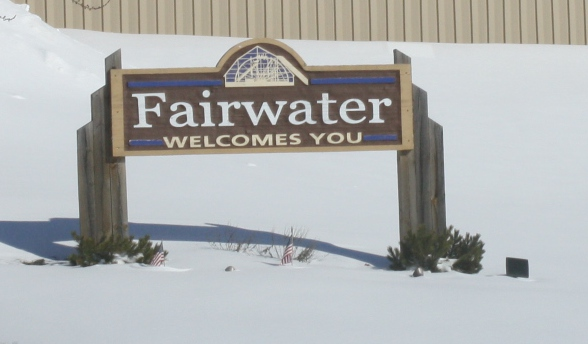
Welcome sign

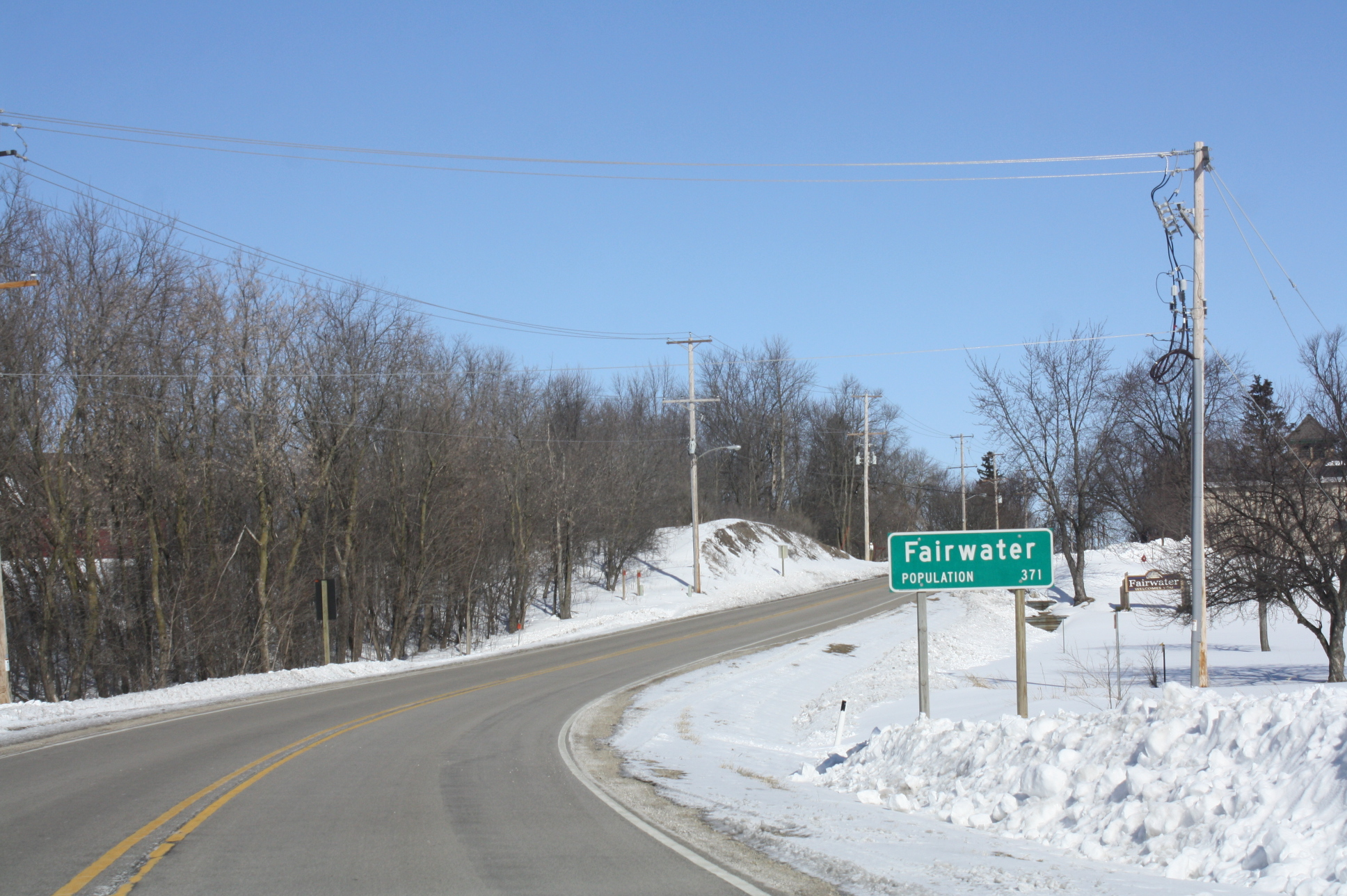
Sign

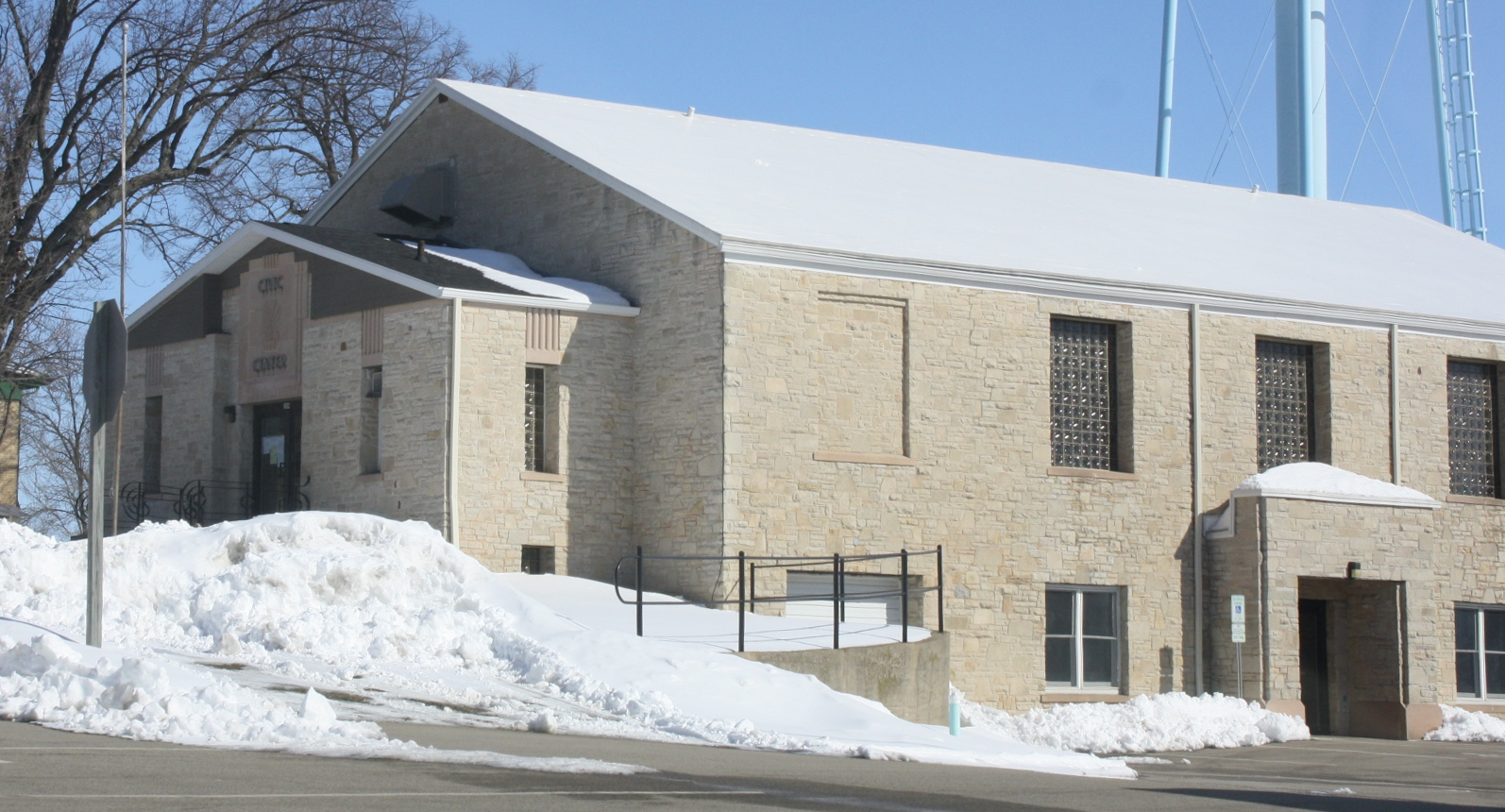
Civic center

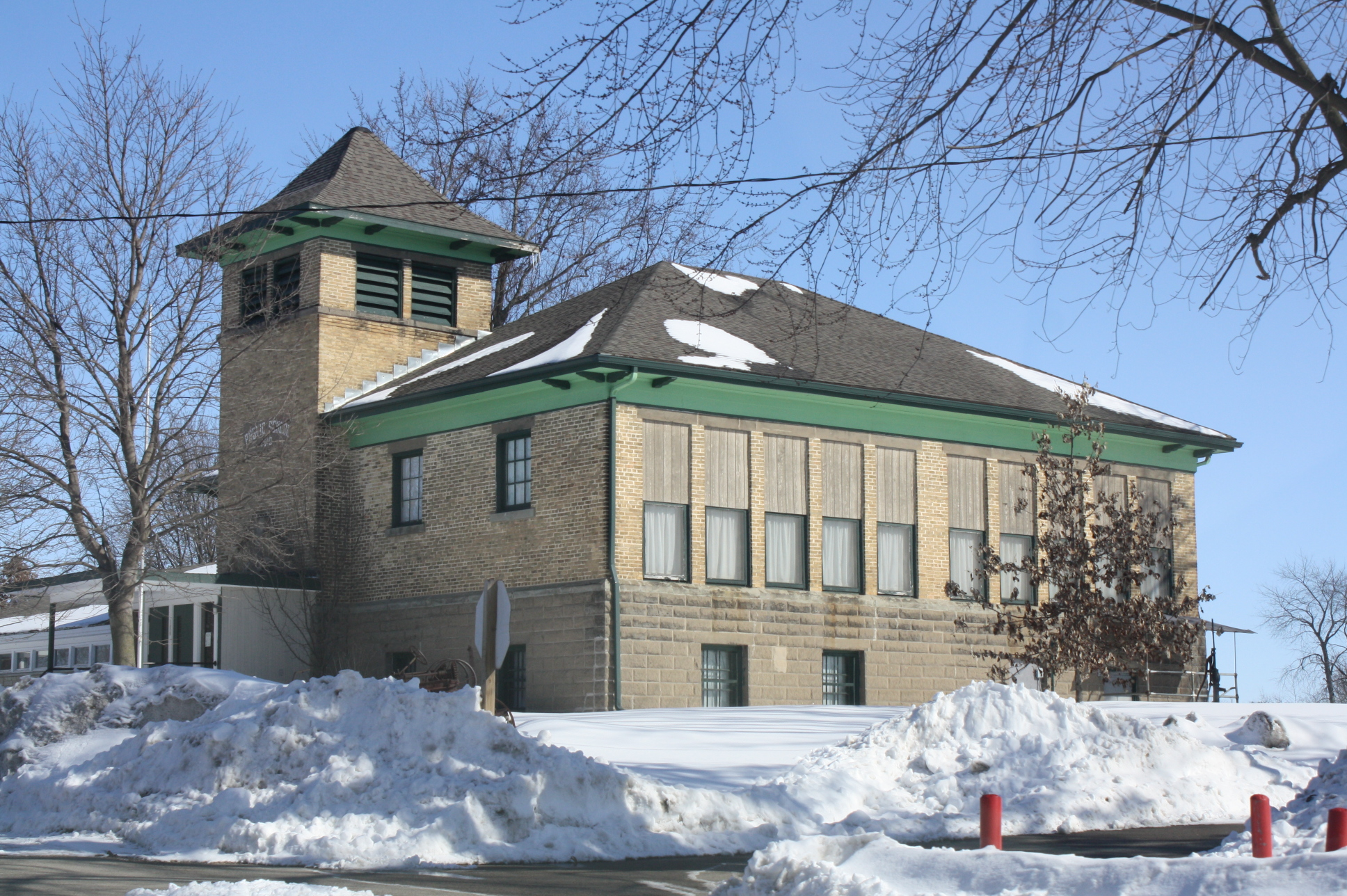
Public school, now historical society

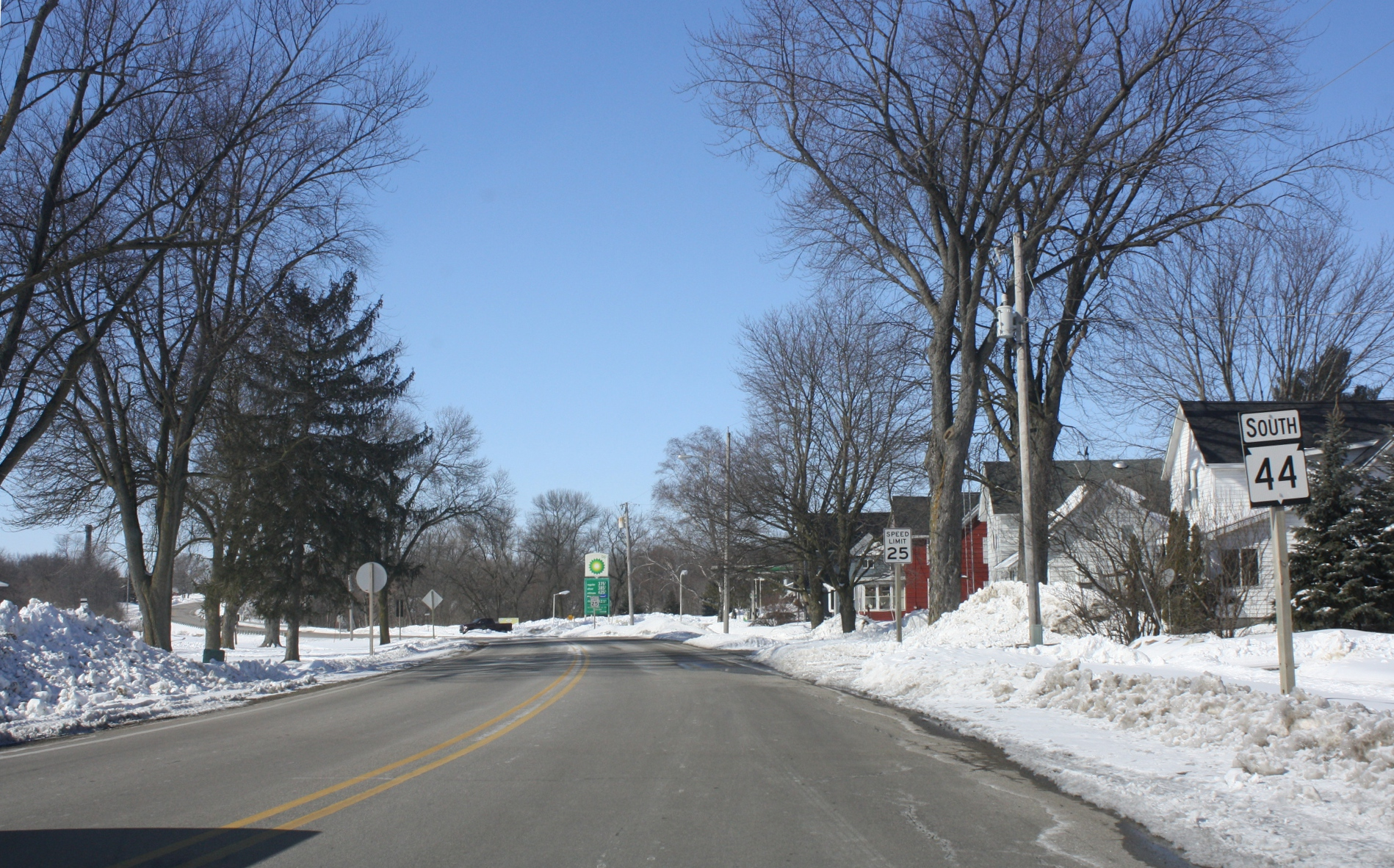
Looking west in Fairwater

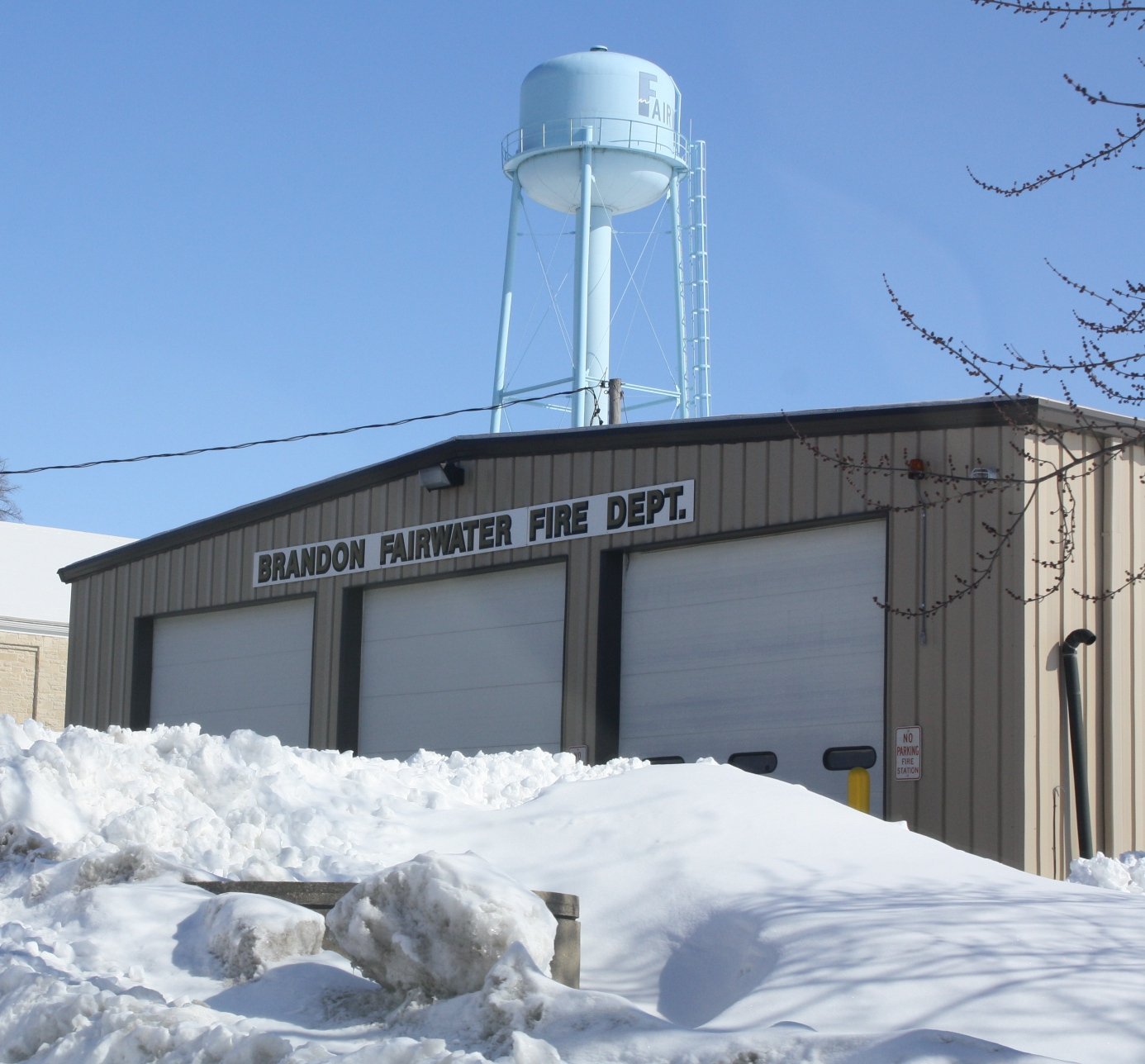
Fire station and water tower
