= Raphael Katz =

American politician (1841–1902)

Raphael Katz (November 21, 1841 – October 22, 1902) was an American businessman and politician.

Born in the Kingdom of Prussia, Katz emigrated to the United States in 1856, living in New York, California, and Illinois, and then settled in Fond du Lac, Wisconsin in 1867. He married Caroline Helene Marks on July 20, 1874. Katz was in the mercantile and clothing business. Katz served on the library board and on the school board. Katz served in the Wisconsin State Assembly and was a Democrat.

Katz died at his home in Fond du Lac, Wisconsin while still in office on October 22, 1902. His funeral was held on October 24, 1902 and he was buried at Rienzi Cemetery in Fond du Lac.
