= Alonzo A. Loper =

American politician

Alonzo A. Loper (March 23, 1829 – January 2, 1917) was a farmer and politician.

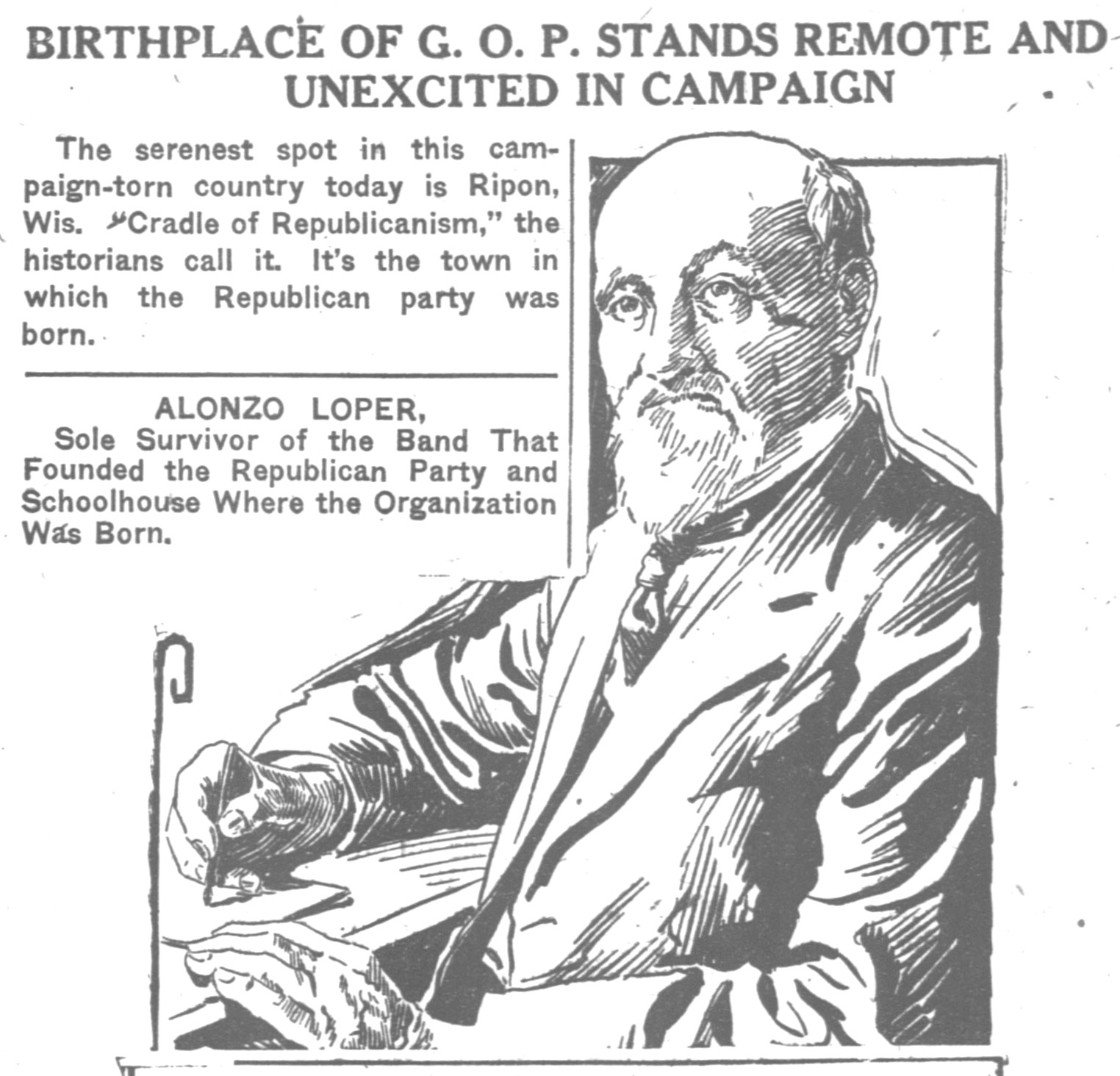
Alonzo Loper depicted in a contemporary 1916 newspaper

Born in Blenheim, New York, Loper moved to Cereso, (now Ripon, Wisconsin), Fond du Lac County, Wisconsin Territory in 1846. Loper was a farmer. He served as town treasurer and also served on the Fond du Lac County Board of Supervisors. Loper was active in the Republican Party. Loper served in the Wisconsin State Assembly in 1873 and then in the Wisconsin State Assembly in 1878 and 1879. In 1887 and 1888, Loper was deputy warden of the Waupun Correctional Institution. Loper died of heart failure in Ripon, Wisconsin.
