= James K. Scribner =

American politician

James K. Scribner (June 13, 1828 – April 3, 1910) was a member of the Wisconsin State Assembly.

== Biography ==
Scribner was born on June 13, 1828, in Westport, Connecticut. He was a miller by trade. He was widowed in 1897 when his wife, Laura née Wheeler, died. Scribner died on April 3, 1910, in Minneapolis.

== Assembly career ==
Scribner was a member of the Assembly during the 1876 session from Eldorado. He was a Republican.
