= Friendship (town), Wisconsin =

Town in Fond du Lac County, Wisconsin

Friendship, Wisconsin
- Town
- Town of Friendship
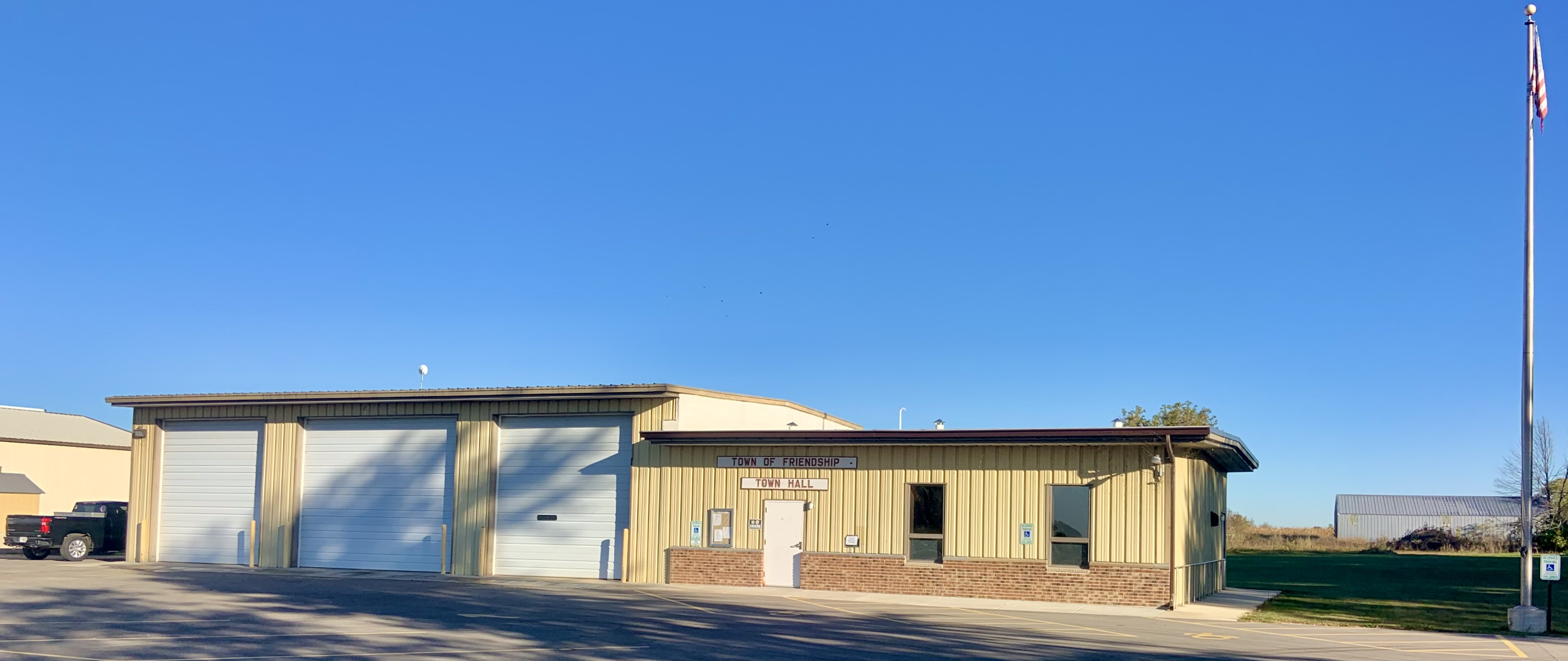
- Friendship Town Hall

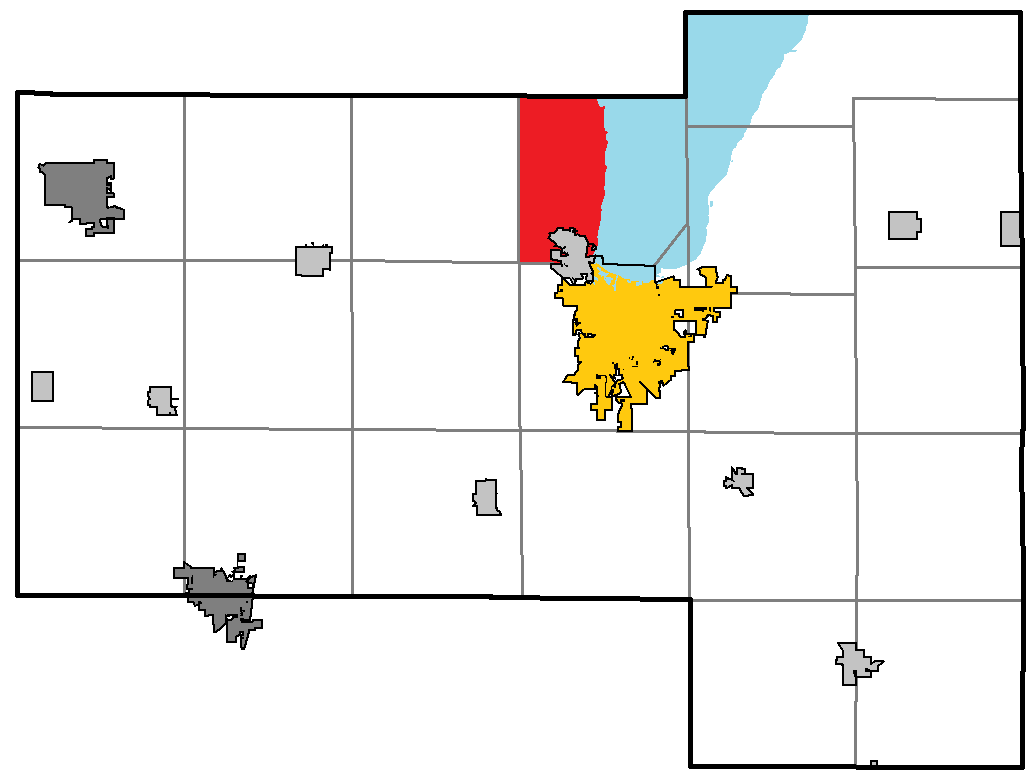
- Location of Friendship, within Fond du Lac County
- Coordinates: 43°51′09″N 88°28′06″W
- Country: United States
- State: Wisconsin
- County: Fond du Lac

Area
  - Total: 34.2 sq mi (89 km^{2})
  - Land: 16.58 sq mi (42.9 km^{2})
  - Water: 17.62 sq mi (45.6 km^{2})

Population (2020)
  - Total: 2,748
  - Density: 165.7/sq mi (63.99/km^{2})
- Time zone: UTC-6 (Central (CST))
  - Summer (DST): UTC-5 (CDT)
- Area code(s): 920 & 274
- GNIS feature ID: 1583249

Friendship is a town in Fond du Lac County, Wisconsin, United States. The population was 2,748 at the 2020 census. The unincorporated communities of Dexter and Van Dyne are located within the town.

== Geography ==
According to the United States Census Bureau, the town has a total area of 34.4 square miles (89.2 km^{2}), of which 17.0 square miles (44.1 km^{2}) is land and 17.4 square miles (45.1 km^{2}) (50.55%) is water.

== Demographics ==
At the 2000 United States census there were 2,406 people, 971 households, and 690 families living in the town. The population density was 141.3 people per square mile (54.6/km^{2}). There were 1,062 housing units at an average density of 62.4 per square mile (24.1/km^{2}). The racial makeup of the town was 98.55% White, 0.21% African American, 0.17% Native American, 0.08% Asian, 0.25% Pacific Islander, 0.33% from other races, and 0.42% from two or more races. Hispanic or Latino of any race were 1.79%.

Of the 971 households 30.4% had children under the age of 18 living with them, 59.7% were married couples living together, 7.0% had a female householder with no husband present, and 28.9% were non-families. 22.0% of households were one person and 7.7% were one person aged 65 or older. The average household size was 2.48 and the average family size was 2.90.

The age distribution was 24.4% under the age of 18, 7.0% from 18 to 24, 29.6% from 25 to 44, 25.1% from 45 to 64, and 13.8% 65 or older. The median age was 38 years. For every 100 females, there were 103.6 males. For every 100 females age 18 and over, there were 103.4 males.

The median household income was $46,953 and the median family income was $51,287. Males had a median income of $36,556 versus $24,361 for females. The per capita income for the town was $22,751. About 1.4% of families and 2.7% of the population were below the poverty line, including 0.6% of those under age 18 and 2.1% of those age 65 or over.
