= Brandon, Wisconsin =

- Village
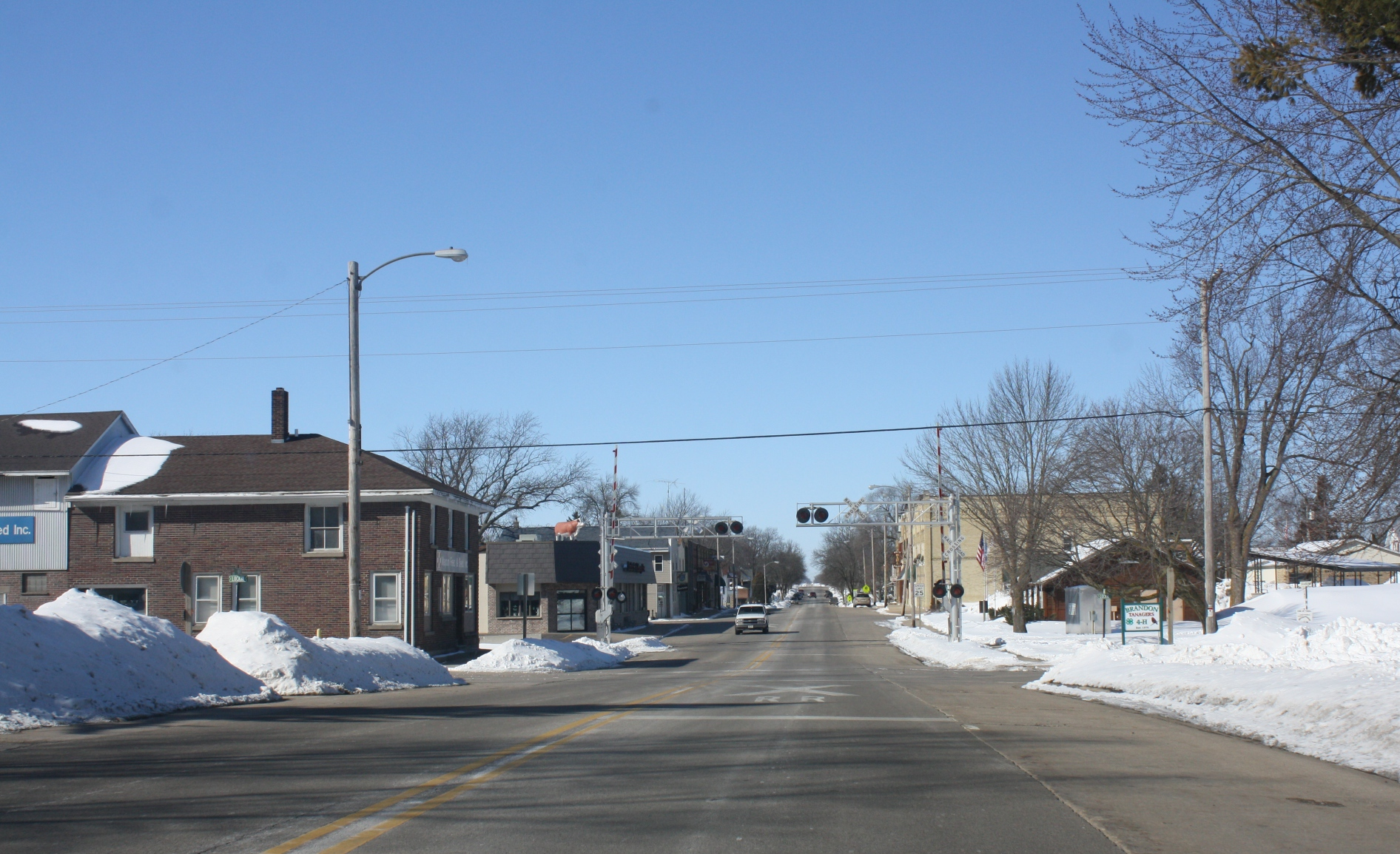
- Looking west in Brandon

- Location of Brandon in Fond du Lac County, Wisconsin.
- Coordinates: 43°44′8″N 88°46′56″W
- Country: United States
- State: Wisconsin
- County: Fond du Lac
- settled: 1856

Area
  - Total: 0.76 sq mi (1.98 km^{2})
  - Land: 0.76 sq mi (1.96 km^{2})
  - Water: 0.0077 sq mi (0.02 km^{2})
- Elevation: 1,001 ft (305 m)

Population (2020)
  - Total: 882
  - Density: 1,160.5/sq mi (448.1/km^{2})
- Time zone: UTC-6 (Central (CST))
  - Summer (DST): UTC-5 (CDT)
- Area code: 920
- FIPS code: 55-09300
- GNIS feature ID: 1562145
- Website: villageofbrandon.com

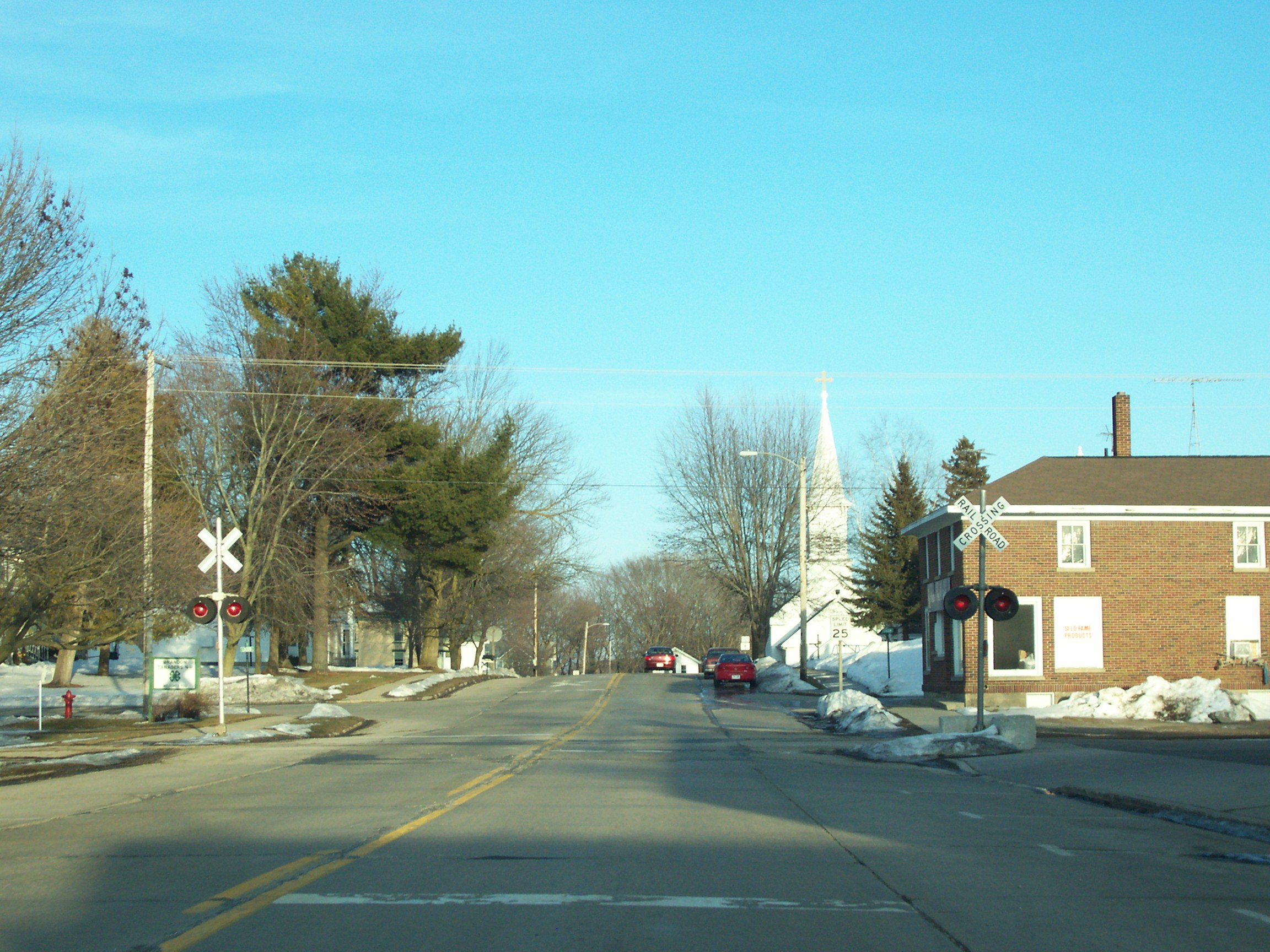
Looking east at Brandon on Highway 49

Brandon is a village in Fond du Lac County, Wisconsin, United States. The population was 882 at the 2020 census.

== History ==
Brandon was originally dubbed "Bungtown" in the town's creation in 1856.

The Rens Hemp Company of Brandon, Wisconsin, closed in 1958, the last legal hemp producer nationwide in operation following the World Wars. Prior to its 1957 shutdown, Rens had been the primary provider of hemp rope for the United States Navy.

== Geography ==
Brandon is located at 43°44′8″N 88°46′56″W (43.735444, -88.782093).

The source of the northernmost West Branch of the Rock River is located in the Community Park, on the west edge of Brandon.

According to the United States Census Bureau, the village has a total area of 0.77 square miles (1.99 km^{2}), of which 0.76 square miles (1.97 km^{2}) is land and 0.01 square miles (0.03 km^{2}) is water.

== Demographics ==
Historical population
Census	Pop.	Note	%±
1880	601		—
1890	660		9.8%
1900	663		0.5%
1910	684		3.2%
1920	682		−0.3%
1930	646		−5.3%
1940	708		9.6%
1950	728		2.8%
1960	758		4.1%
1970	872		15.0%
1980	862		−1.1%
1990	872		1.2%
2000	912		4.6%
2010	879		−3.6%
2020	882		0.3%
U.S. Decennial Census

=== 2020 census ===
As of the 2020 census, there were 882 people, and 331 households. The population density was 1,160.5 inhabitants per square mile (448.1/km^{2}). There were 357 housing units at an average density of 469.7 per square mile (181.4/km^{2}). The racial makeup of the village was 90.5% White, 0.7% Black or African American, 0.3% Native American, 0.2% Asian, 3.3% from other races, and 5.0% from two or more races. Hispanic or Latino of any race were 8.6% of the population.

=== 2010 census ===
As of the census of 2010, there were 879 people, 336 households, and 233 families living in the village. The population density was 1,156.6 inhabitants per square mile (446.6/km^{2}). There were 369 housing units at an average density of 485.5 per square mile (187.5/km^{2}). The racial makeup of the village was 94.8% White, 0.5% African American, 0.3% Native American, 3.1% from other races, and 1.4% from two or more races. Hispanic or Latino of any race were 5.0% of the population.

There were 336 households, of which 36.6% had children under the age of 18 living with them, 56.8% were married couples living together, 9.5% had a female householder with no husband present, 3.0% had a male householder with no wife present, and 30.7% were non-families. 25.9% of all households were made up of individuals, and 11.9% had someone living alone who was 65 years of age or older. The average household size was 2.58 and the average family size was 3.13.

The median age in the village was 38.4 years. 28.2% of residents were under the age of 18; 7.2% were between the ages of 18 and 24; 26.4% were from 25 to 44; 25.2% were from 45 to 64; and 13% were 65 years of age or older. The gender makeup of the village was 49.5% male and 50.5% female.

=== 2000 census ===
As of the census of 2000, there were 912 people, 342 households, and 258 families living in the village. The population density was 1,165.9 people per square mile (451.4/km^{2}). There were 357 housing units at an average density of 456.4 per square mile (176.7/km^{2}). The racial makeup of the village was 99.78% White, 0.11% Native American, 0.11% from other races. Hispanic or Latino of any race were 0.77% of the population.

There were 342 households, out of which 40.4% had children under the age of 18 living with them, 66.4% were married couples living together, 7.3% had a female householder with no husband present, and 24.3% were non-families. 21.9% of all households were made up of individuals, and 11.1% had someone living alone who was 65 years of age or older. The average household size was 2.67 and the average family size was 3.14.

In the village, the population was spread out, with 29.7% under the age of 18, 6.7% from 18 to 24, 32.2% from 25 to 44, 18.2% from 45 to 64, and 13.2% who were 65 years of age or older. The median age was 34 years. For every 100 females, there were 86.5 males. For every 100 females age 18 and over, there were 87.4 males.

The median income for a household in the village was $43,542, and the median income for a family was $50,227. Males had a median income of $35,595 versus $22,176 for females. The per capita income for the village was $17,437. About 4.3% of families and 5.3% of the population were below the poverty line, including 4.9% of those under age 18 and 9.1% of those age 65 or over.

== Notable people ==
- Robert M. Graham, dairyist and legislator
- John E. Johnson, legislator
- Lester Johnson, U.S. Representative
- Lewis Ralph Jones, botanist
- Laura Ramsey, actress
- David Whitton, lawyer and legislator
- Andrew J. Yorty, businessman and legislator

== Images ==
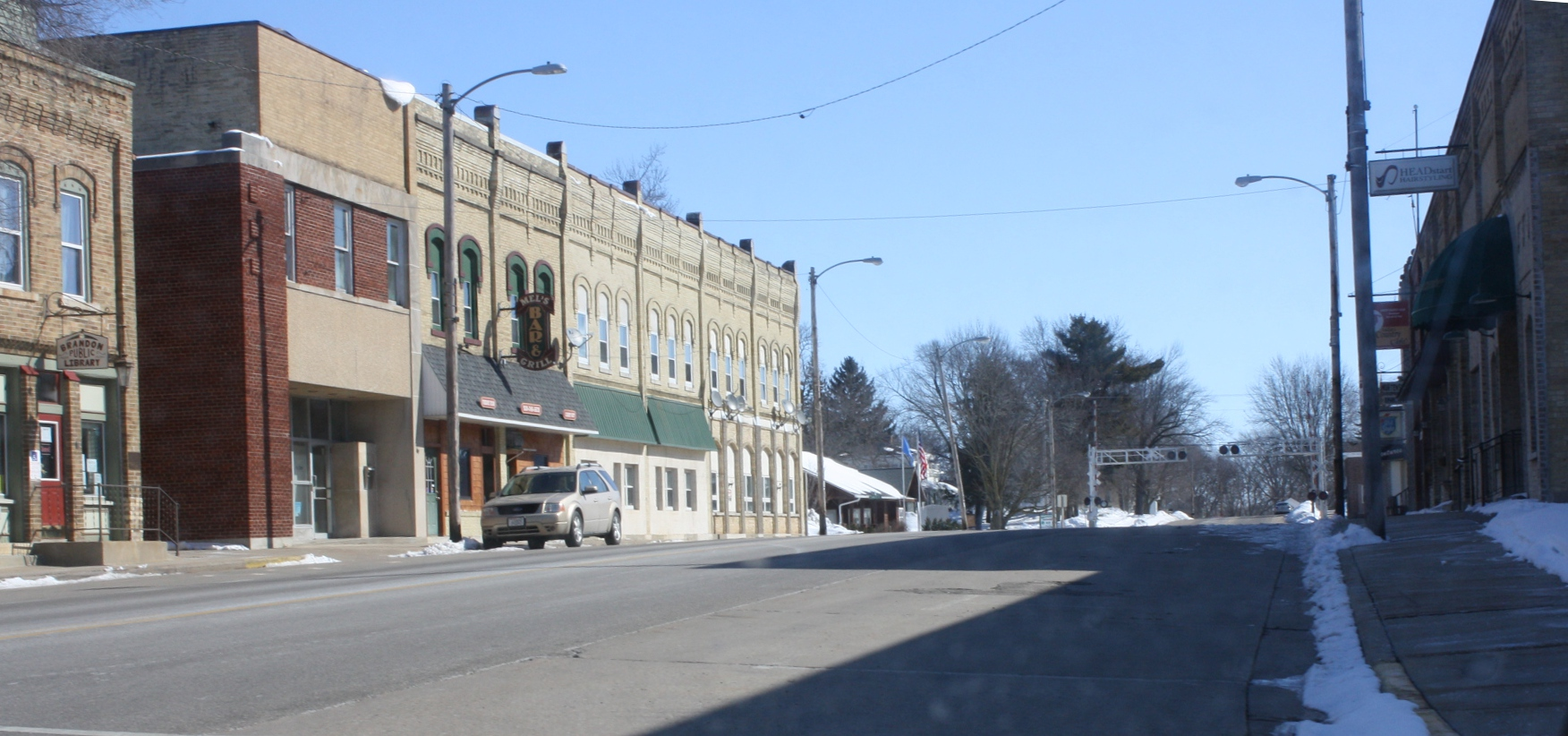
Looking east at downtown Brandon

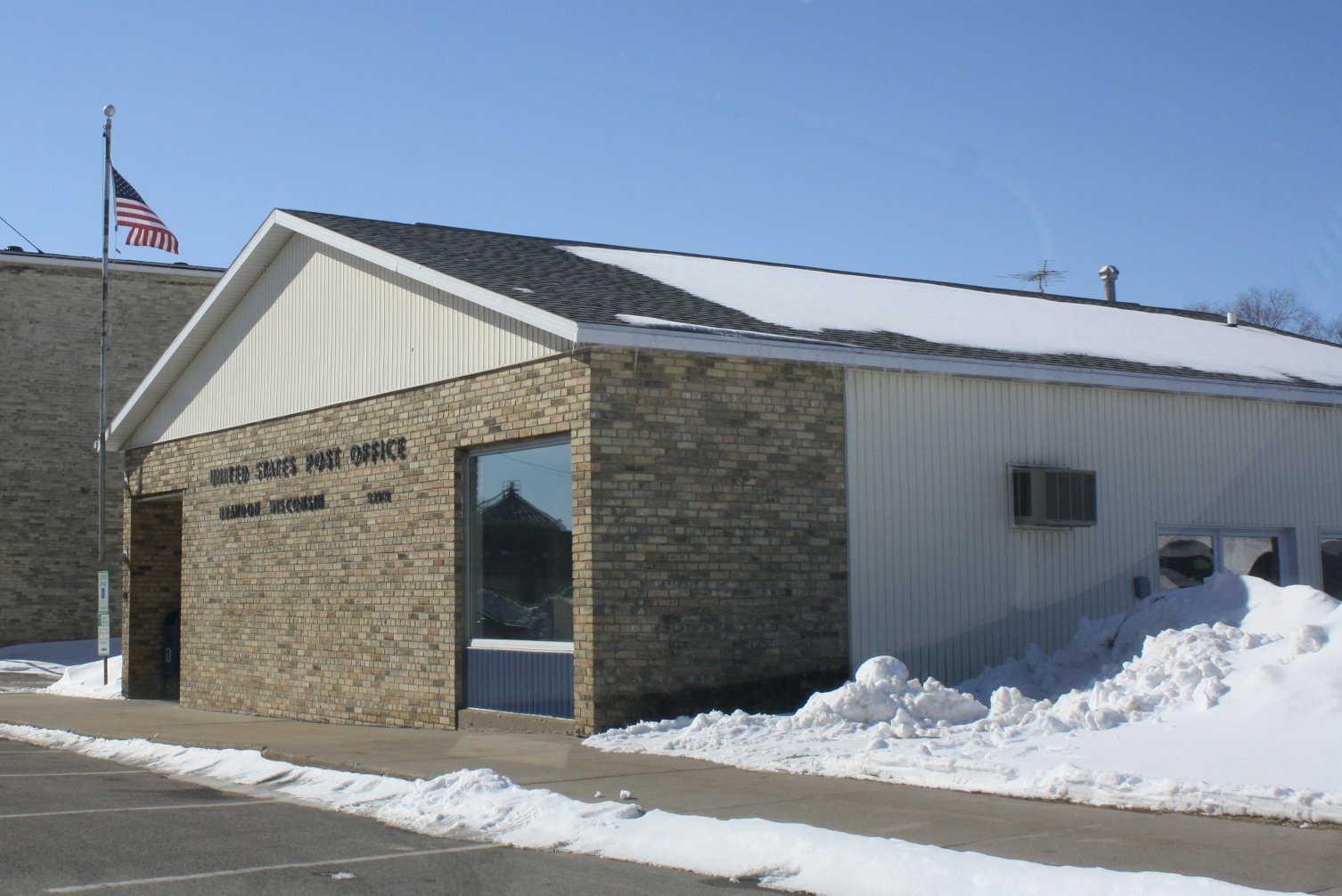
Post office

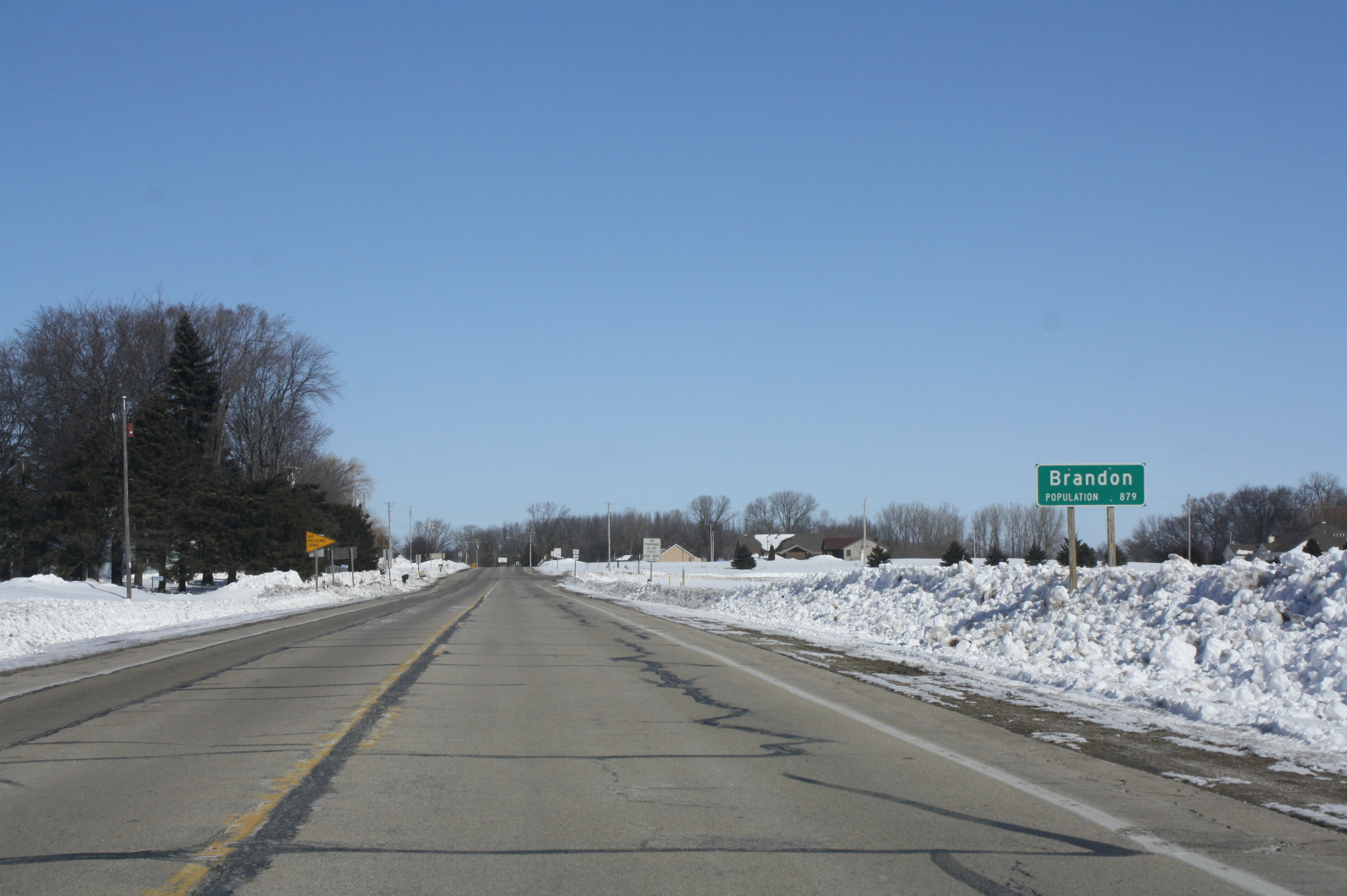
Sign

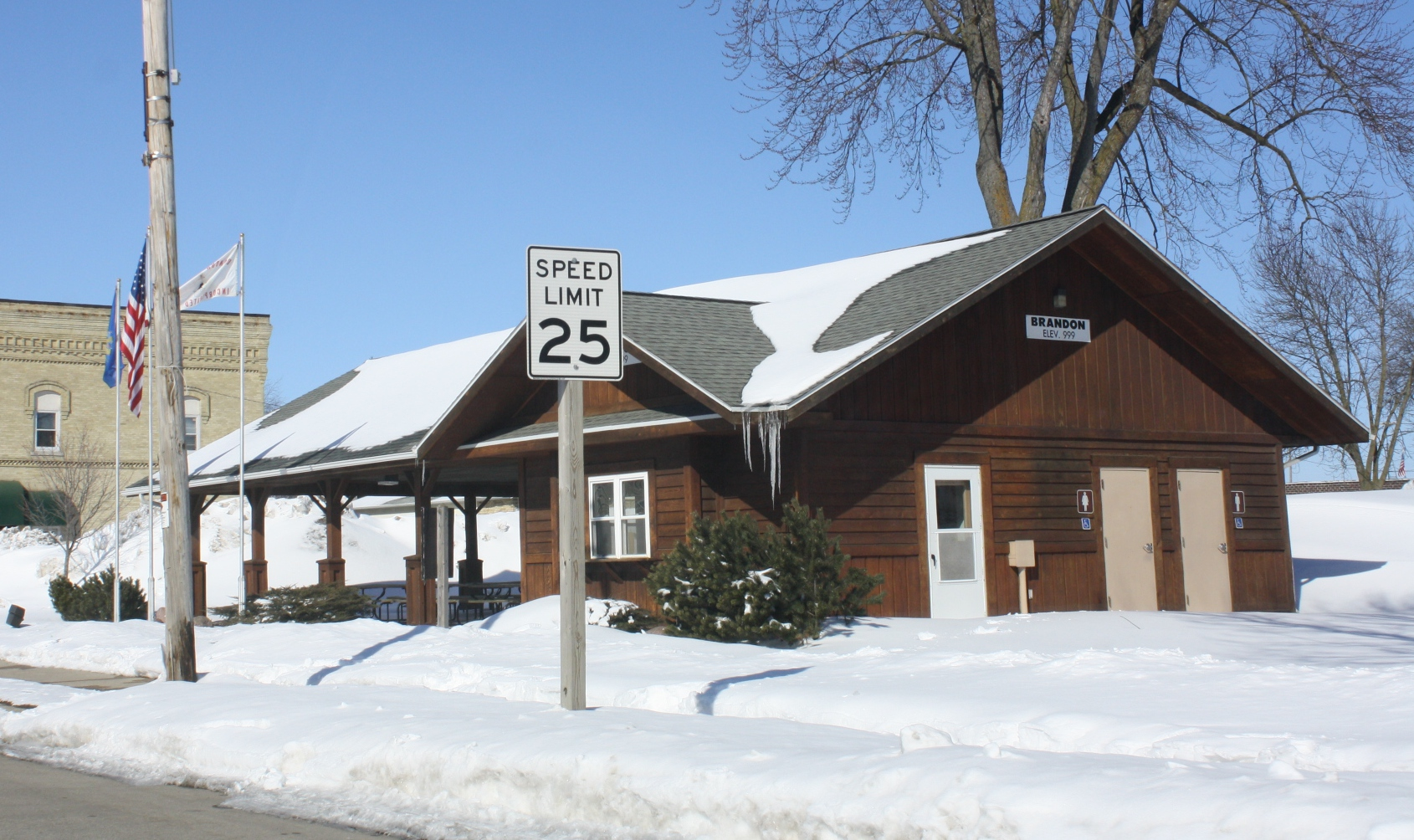
Train depot

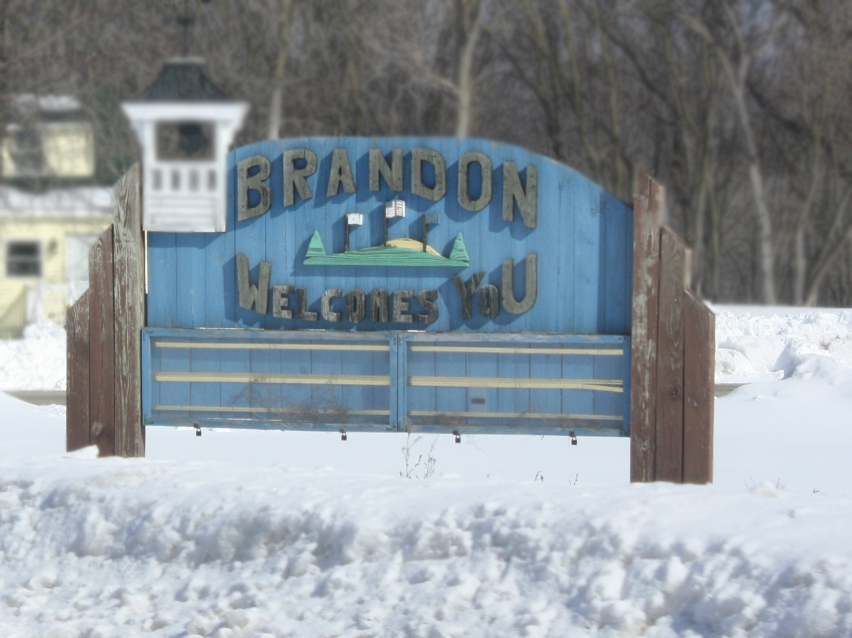
Welcome sign

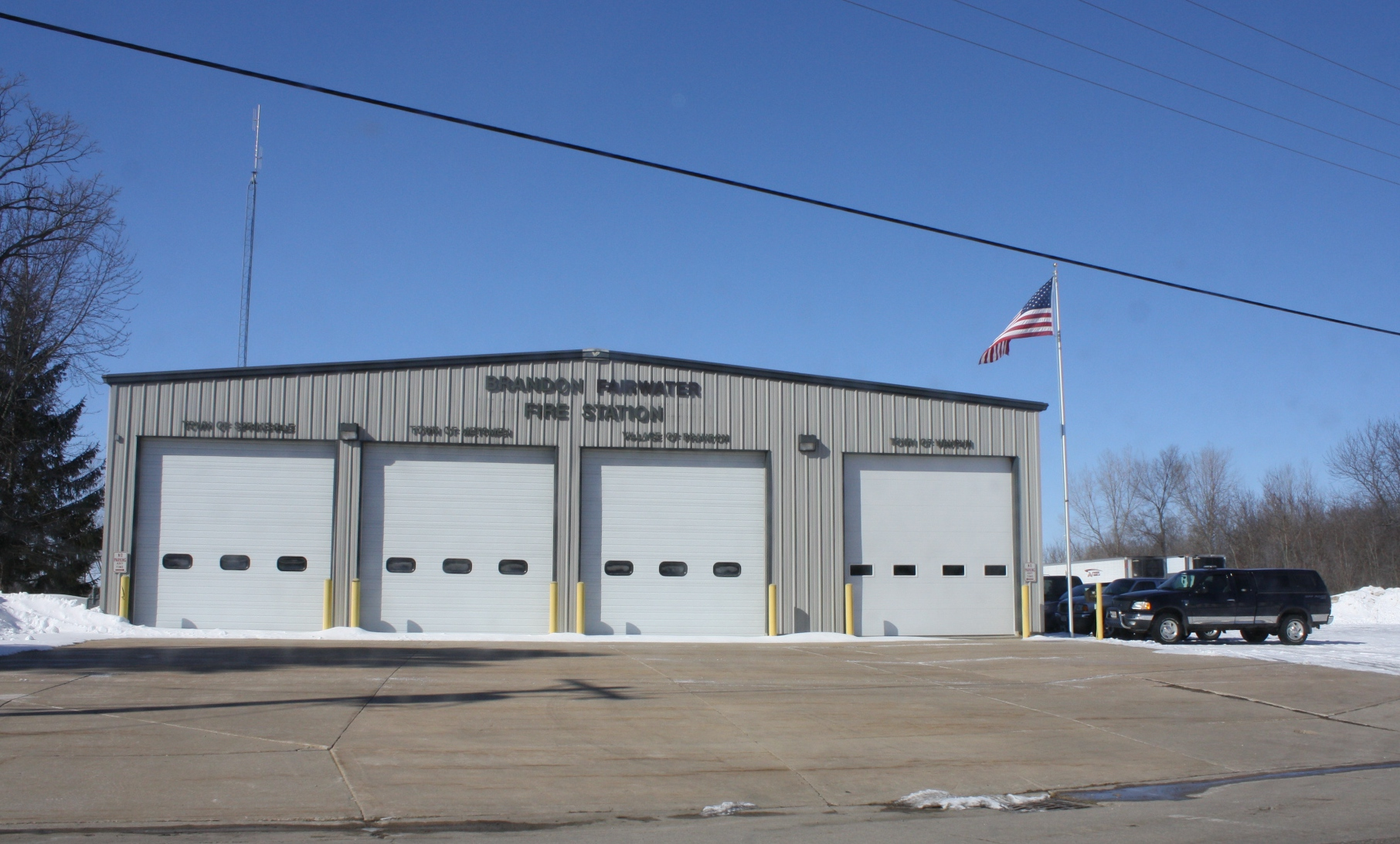
Fire station
