= 72nd Wisconsin Legislature =

Wisconsin legislative term for 1955–1956

←	71st	73rd	→
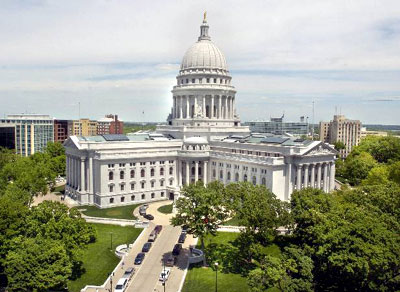
- Wisconsin State Capitol

Overview
- Legislative body: Wisconsin Legislature
- Meeting place: Wisconsin State Capitol
- Term: January 3, 1955 – January 7, 1957
- Election: November 2, 1954

Senate
- Members: 33
- Senate President: Warren P. Knowles (R)
- President pro tempore: Frank E. Panzer (R)
- Party control: Republican

Assembly
- Members: 100
- Assembly Speaker: Mark Catlin Jr. (R)
- Party control: Republican

Sessions
- Regular: January 12, 1955 – October 21, 1955

The Seventy-Second Wisconsin Legislature convened from January 12, 1955, to October 21 1955, in regular session.

This was the first legislative session after the redistricting of the Senate and Assembly according to an act of the 1951 session (The implementation of that redistricting act had been delayed to the 1954 election).

Senators representing odd-numbered districts were newly elected for this session and were serving the first two years of a four-year term. Assembly members were elected to a two-year term. Assembly members and odd-numbered senators were elected in the general election of November 2, 1954. Senators representing even-numbered districts were serving the third and fourth year of a four-year term, having been elected in the general election of November 4, 1952.

The governor of Wisconsin during this entire term was Republican Walter J. Kohler Jr., of Sheboygan County, serving his third two-year term, having won re-election in the 1954 Wisconsin gubernatorial election.

== Major events ==
- January 3, 1955: Third inauguration of Walter J. Kohler Jr. as Governor of Wisconsin.
- April 5, 1955: 1955 Wisconsin spring election:
  - Wisconsin voters ratified two amendments to the state constitution:
    - created a new section in Article VII (judiciary) establishing qualifications for state judges and setting a mandatory retirement age at 70.
    - adjusted debt limit rules for school districts.
- May 14, 1955: Eight communist bloc counties, including the Soviet Union, signed the Warsaw Pact, establishing a defensive alliance.
- August 28, 1955: Emmett Till was lynched in Money, Mississippi.
- November 1, 1955: The United States Military Assistance Advisory Group for South Vietnam was established. This was later identified as the start of formal U.S. involvement in the Vietnam War.
- December 5, 1955: The American Federation of Labor and the Congress of Industrial Organizations merged, forming the AFL–CIO.
- April 3, 1956: 1956 Wisconsin spring election:
  - Thomas E. Fairchild was elected to the Wisconsin Supreme Court to succeed his father Edward T. Fairchild.
  - Wisconsin voters ratified two amendments to the state constitution:
    - expanded the language around circumstances where municipalities could acquire land for public purposes.
    - created an exception to changes to compensation for retired teachers.
  - Wisconsin voters rejected two other amendements to the state constitution:
    - would have abolished limits on sheriffs serving consecutive terms in office.
    - would have created exceptions in the prohibition on free passes for state officers.
- June 29, 1956: U.S. President Dwight D. Eisenhower signed the Federal-Aid Highway Act of 1956, establishing the Interstate Highway System in the United States.
- August 28, 1956: Wisconsin Supreme Court justice Edward J. Gehl died in office.
- September 5, 1956: Wisconsin Governor Walter J. Kohler Jr. appointed Emmert L. Wingert to the Wisconsin Supreme Court, to succeed the deceased justice Edward J. Gehl.
- November 1, 1956: Soviet forces invaded Hungary to put down the Hungarian Revolution of 1956.
- November 5, 1956: Following Egypt's nationalization of the Suez Company, French and English forces invaded the Suez Canal zone and took control of the canal. Due to sunken commercial ships in the canal, it was closed to traffic until March 1957, resulting in shortages and rationing.
- November 6, 1956: 1956 United States general election:
  - Dwight D. Eisenhower (R) re-elected President of the United States.
  - Vernon Wallace Thomson (R) elected Governor of Wisconsin.
  - Alexander Wiley (R) re-elected United States senator from Wisconsin.
- November 13, 1956: The United States Supreme Court, in the case Browder v. Gayle, found that state and local ordinances which enforced racial segregation of buses were unconstitutional.

== Major legislation ==
- August 3, 1955: An Act ... relating to incorporation of certain towns as fourth class cities, 1955 Act 500. This act dramatically reduced the population density requirements in order for a community to incorporate as a fourth-class city. The act was commonly known as the "Oak Creek Law", because the Milwaukee suburb had worked to pass this law in order to avoid further annexation to the city of Milwaukee.
- 1955 Joint Resolution 14. Second legislative passage of a proposed amendment to the state constitution to create a new section establishing qualifications for state judges and allowing the legislature to set a mandatory retirement age. This amendment was ratified by voters at the 1955 April election.
- 1955 Joint Resolution 17. Second legislative passage of a proposed amendment to the state constitution to add an exception for retired teachers in the rules on changes to compensation for state employees. This amendment was ratified by voters at the 1956 April election.

== Party summary ==
=== Senate summary ===
Senate partisan composition Democratic: 8 seats Republican: 25 seats

	Party (Shading indicates majority caucus)		Total	
	Dem.	Rep.	Total	Vacant
End of previous Legislature	7	24	31	2
Start of Reg. Session	8	25	33	0
From Nov. 1, 1955 (Note: Republican Paul J. Rogan (23rd District) resigned.)	8	24	32	1
From Apr. 13, 1956 (Note: Republican Arthur L. Padrutt (28th District) resigned.)	8	23	31	2
Final voting share	25.81%	74.19%		
Beginning of the next Legislature	10	23	33	0

=== Assembly summary ===
Assembly partisan composition Democratic: 36 seats Republican: 64 seats

	Party (Shading indicates majority caucus)		Total	
	Dem.	Rep.	Total	Vacant
End of previous Legislature	25	72	97	3
Start of Reg. Session	36	64	100	0
From Oct. 12, 1955 (Note: Republican Walter E. Cook (Clark County) died.)	36	63	99	1
From Apr. 16, 1956 (Note: Democrat Ivan A. Nestingen (Dane County) resigned.)	35	63	98	2
Final voting share	35.71%	64.29%		
Beginning of the next Legislature	33	67	100	0

== Sessions ==
- Regular session: January 12, 1955 – October 21, 1955

== Leaders ==
=== Senate leadership ===
- President of the Senate: Warren P. Knowles (R)
- President pro tempore: Frank E. Panzer (R–Oakfield)
- Majority leader: Paul J. Rogan (R–Ladysmith)
- Minority leader: Henry Maier (D–Milwaukee)

=== Assembly leadership ===
- Speaker of the Assembly: Mark Catlin Jr. (R–Appleton)
- Majority leader: Robert G. Marotz (R–Shawano)
- Minority leader: Robert T. Huber (D–West Allis)

== Members ==
=== Members of the Senate ===
Members of the Senate for the Seventy-Second Wisconsin Legislature:

Senate partisan representation Democratic: 8 seats Republican: 25 seats

Dist.	Counties	Senator	Residence	Party
01	Door, Kewaunee, & Manitowoc	Alfred A. Laun Jr.	Kiel	Rep.
02	Brown	Leo P. O'Brien	Green Bay	Rep.
03	Milwaukee (South City)	Casimir Kendziorski	Milwaukee	Dem.
04	Milwaukee (North County)	Harry F. Franke Jr.	Milwaukee	Rep.
05	Milwaukee (Northwest City)	Walter L. Merten	Milwaukee	Rep.
06	Milwaukee (City center)	William A. Schmidt	Milwaukee	Dem.
07	Milwaukee (South County & Southeast City)	Leland McParland	Cudahy	Dem.
08	Milwaukee (Western County)	Allen Busby	West Milwaukee	Rep.
09	Milwaukee (City Downtown)	Henry Maier	Milwaukee	Dem.
10	Buffalo, Dunn, Pepin, Pierce, & St. Croix	Robert P. Knowles	New Richmond	Rep.
11	Milwaukee (Western City)	Richard J. Zaborski	Milwaukee	Dem.
12	Iron, Lincoln, Oneida, Price, Taylor, & Vilas	Bernard J. Gehrmann	Mellen	Rep.
13	Dodge & Washington	Frank E. Panzer	Oakfield	Rep.
14	Outagamie & Waupaca	Gerald Lorge	Bear Creek	Rep.
15	Rock	Peter P. Carr	Janesville	Rep.
16	Dane (Excluding Madison)	Foster B. Porter	Bloomington	Rep.
17	Grant, Green, Iowa, & Lafayette	Robert S. Travis	Platteville	Rep.
18	Fond du Lac, Green Lake & Waushara	Alfred Van De Zande	Campbellsport	Rep.
19	Calumet & Winnebago	William Draheim	Neenah	Rep.
20	Ozaukee & Sheboygan	Louis H. Prange	Plymouth	Rep.
21	Racine	Lynn E. Stalbaum	Racine	Dem.
22	Kenosha & Walworth	William Trinke	Lake Geneva	Rep.
23	Barron, Burnett, Polk, Rusk, Sawyer, & Washburn	Paul J. Rogan (Res. Nov. 1, 1955)	Ladysmith	Rep.
24	Clark, Portage, & Wood	William W. Clark	Vesper	Rep.
25	Ashland, Bayfield, & Douglas	Carl Lauri	Merrill	Dem.
26	Dane (Madison)	Gaylord Nelson	Madison	Dem.
27	Columbia, Crawford, Richland, & Sauk	Jess Miller	Richland Center	Rep.
28	Chippewa & Eau Claire	Arthur L. Padrutt (Res. Apr. 13, 1956)	Chippewa Falls	Rep.
29	Marathon & Shawano	Hugh M. Jones	Wausau	Rep.
30	Florence, Forest, Langlade, Marinette, & Oconto	Philip Downing	Amberg	Rep.
31	Adams, Juneau, Monroe, Marquette, & Vernon	J. Earl Leverich	Sparta	Rep.
32	Jackson, La Crosse, & Trempealeau	Raymond Bice Sr.	La Crosse	Rep.
33	Jefferson & Waukesha	Chester Dempsey	Hartland	Rep.

=== Members of the Assembly ===
Members of the Assembly for the Seventy-Second Wisconsin Legislature:

Assembly partisan composition Democratic: 36 seats Republican: 64 seats

Milwaukee County districts

Senate Dist.	County	Dist.	Representative	Party	Residence
31	Adams, Juneau, & Marquette		Louis C. Romell	Rep.	Adams
25	Ashland & Bayfield		Vic C. Wallin	Rep.	Grand View
23	Barron		Charles H. Sykes	Rep.	Cameron
02	Brown	1	Jerome Quinn	Rep.	Green Bay
02	Brown	2	Robert E. Lynch	Dem.	Green Bay
02	Brown	3	Edward A. Seymour	Rep.	De Pere
10	Buffalo, Pepin, & Pierce		Mamre H. Ward	Rep.	Durand
23	Burnett & Polk		Raymond A. Peabody	Rep.	Milltown
19	Calumet		Henry M. Peters	Rep.	Menasha
28	Chippewa		Sylvia H. Raihle	Rep.	Chippewa Falls
24	Clark		Walter E. Cook (died Oct. 12, 1955)	Rep.	Unity
27	Columbia		Everett Bidwell	Rep.	Portage
27	Crawford & Richland		Milford C. Kintz	Rep.	Richland Center
26	Dane	1	Joseph Wheeler Bloodgood	Dem.	Madison
26	Dane	2	Ivan A. Nestingen (Res. Apr. 16, 1956)	Dem.	Madison
26	Dane	3	Carroll Metzner	Rep.	Madison
16	Dane	4	Carl W. Thompson	Dem.	Stoughton
16	Dane	5	Ervin M. Bruner	Dem.	Verona
13	Dodge	1	Elmer L. Genzmer	Rep.	Mayville
13	Dodge	2	Elmer C. Nitschke	Rep.	Beaver Dam
01	Door & Kewaunee		Frank N. Graass	Rep.	Sturgeon Bay
25	Douglas	1	Reino A. Perala	Dem.	Superior
25	Douglas	2	Lawrence M. Hagen	Rep.	Superior
10	Dunn		G. H. Bakke	Rep.	Menomonie
28	Eau Claire	1	Ray Kuhlman	Rep.	Eau Claire
28	Eau Claire	2	Bernard H. Raether	Dem.	Augusta
30	Florence, Forest, & Langlade		Alfred J. Lauby	Dem.	Antigo
18	Fond du Lac	1	Nicholas J. Lesselyoung	Rep.	Fond du Lac
18	Fond du Lac	2	Fred W. Schlueter	Rep.	Ripon
17	Grant		William A. Loy	Rep.	Fennimore
17	Green		Harry A. Keegan	Rep.	Monroe
18	Green Lake & Waushara		William Belter	Rep.	Wautoma
17	Iowa & Lafayette		Walter B. Calvert	Rep.	Benton
12	Iron, Oneida, & Vilas		Marvin E. Dillman	Rep.	Lac du Flambeau
32	Jackson & Trempealeau		Keith C. Hardie	Dem.	Taylor
33	Jefferson		Byron F. Wackett	Rep.	Watertown
22	Kenosha	1	George Molinaro	Dem.	Kenosha
22	Kenosha	2	Joseph Lourigan	Dem.	Kenosha
32	La Crosse	1	James D. H. Peterson	Rep.	La Crosse
32	La Crosse	2	Eugene A. Toepel	Rep.	La Crosse
12	Lincoln		Emil A. Hinz	Rep.	Merrill
01	Manitowoc	1	Hugo E. Vogel	Dem.	Manitowoc
01	Manitowoc	2	Frank J. LeClair	Rep.	Two Rivers
29	Marathon	1	Ben A. Riehle	Dem.	Athens
29	Marathon	2	Paul A. Luedtke	Rep.	Wausau
30	Marinette		Roy H. Sengstock	Rep.	Marinette
04	Milwaukee	1	Edward F. Mertz	Dem.	Milwaukee
09	Milwaukee	2	Walton Bryan Stewart	Dem.	Milwaukee
09	Milwaukee	3	Joseph A. Greco	Dem.	Milwaukee
11	Milwaukee	4	Joseph P. Murphy	Dem.	Milwaukee
05	Milwaukee	5	Lawrence W. Timmerman	Rep.	Milwaukee
09	Milwaukee	6	Isaac N. Coggs	Dem.	Milwaukee
06	Milwaukee	7	James G. Lippert	Dem.	Milwaukee
11	Milwaukee	8	George Talsky	Dem.	Milwaukee
05	Milwaukee	9	Charles J. Schmidt	Dem.	Milwaukee
06	Milwaukee	10	Michael F. O'Connell	Dem.	Milwaukee
03	Milwaukee	11	Ervin J. Ryczek	Dem.	Milwaukee
03	Milwaukee	12	George Sokolowski	Dem.	Milwaukee
06	Milwaukee	13	Cecil B. Brown Jr.	Dem.	Milwaukee
03	Milwaukee	14	Richard B. Nowakowski	Dem.	Milwaukee
05	Milwaukee	15	Earle W. Fricker	Rep.	Milwaukee
11	Milwaukee	16	Thomas J. Duffey	Dem.	Milwaukee
07	Milwaukee	17	Howard F. Pellant	Dem.	Milwaukee
04	Milwaukee	18	Ralph Landowski	Dem.	Milwaukee
04	Milwaukee	19	William Kasik	Rep.	Milwaukee
08	Milwaukee	20	Glen Pommerening	Rep.	Wauwatosa
08	Milwaukee	21	Arthur J. Balzer	Dem.	West Allis
08	Milwaukee	22	Robert T. Huber	Dem.	West Allis
07	Milwaukee	23	William Luebke	Dem.	Milwaukee
07	Milwaukee	24	George C. Windrow	Dem.	Cudahy
31	Monroe		Earl D. Hall	Rep.	Tomah
30	Oconto		Reuben La Fave	Rep.	Oconto
14	Outagamie	1	Mark Catlin Jr.	Rep.	Appleton
14	Outagamie	2	William T. Sullivan	Rep.	Kaukauna
20	Ozaukee		Warren A. Grady	Rep.	Port Washington
24	Portage		John Kostuck	Dem.	Stevens Point
12	Price & Taylor		Vincent J. Zellinger	Rep.	Phillips
21	Racine	1	Earl W. Warren	Dem.	Racine
21	Racine	2	Roy E. Naleid	Dem.	Racine
21	Racine	3	Anthony B. Rewald	Rep.	Burlington
15	Rock	1	Clyde Jewett	Rep.	Janesville
15	Rock	2	David Blanchard	Rep.	Edgerton
15	Rock	3	Wallace Leschinsky	Rep.	Beloit
23	Rusk, Sawyer, & Washburn		Willis J. Hutnik	Rep.	Tony
27	Sauk		James R. Stone	Rep.	Reedsburg
29	Shawano		Robert G. Marotz	Rep.	Shawano
20	Sheboygan	1	Fred E. Nuernberg	Rep.	Sheboygan
20	Sheboygan	2	Harold F. Huibregtse	Rep.	Sheboygan Falls
10	St. Croix		William A. Bergeron	Rep.	Somerset
16	Vernon		Bernard Lewison	Rep.	Viroqua
22	Walworth		Ora R. Rice	Rep.	Delavan
13	Washington		Elmer J. Schowalter	Rep.	Jackson
33	Waukesha	1	Alvin J. Redford	Rep.	Waukesha
33	Waukesha	2	Alfred R. Ludvigsen	Rep.	Hartland
14	Waupaca		Richard E. Peterson	Rep.	Clintonville
19	Winnebago	1	Harvey R. Abraham	Rep.	Oshkosh
19	Winnebago	2	Joseph H. Anderson	Rep.	Winneconne
19	Winnebago	3	Arnold J. Cane	Rep.	Menasha
24	Wood	1	John S. Crawford	Rep.	Marshfield
24	Wood	2	Arthur J. Crowns	Rep.	Wisconsin Rapids

== Committees ==
=== Senate committees ===
- Senate Standing Committee on Agriculture and Conservation – J. E. Leverich, chair
- Senate Standing Committee on Committees – J. Miller, chair
- Senate Standing Committee on Contingent Expenditures – L. H. Prange, chair
- Senate Standing Committee on Education and Public Welfare – W. W. Clark, chair
- Senate Standing Committee on Governmental and Veterans Affairs – A. L. Padrutt, chair
- Senate Standing Committee on Highways – J. Miller, chair
- Senate Standing Committee on the Judiciary – A. Busby, chair
- Senate Standing Committee on Labor, Taxation, Insurance, and Banking – A. Van De Zande, chair
- Senate Standing Committee on Legislative Procedure – F. E. Panzer, chair

=== Assembly committees ===
- Assembly Standing Committee on Agriculture – O. R. Rice, chair
- Assembly Standing Committee on Commerce and Manufactures – M. H. Ward, chair
- Assembly Standing Committee on Conservation – R. La Fave, chair
- Assembly Standing Committee on Contingent Expenditures – W. Belter, chair
- Assembly Standing Committee on Education – W. J. Hutnik, chair
- Assembly Standing Committee on Elections – F. E. Nuernberg, chair
- Assembly Standing Committee on Engrossed Bills – L. M. Hagen, chair
- Assembly Standing Committee on Enrolled Bills – R. A. Peabody, chair
- Assembly Standing Committee on Excise and Fees – E. L. Genzmer, chair
- Assembly Standing Committee on Highways – G. H. Bakke, chair
- Assembly Standing Committee on Insurance and Banking – R. H. Sengstock, chair
- Assembly Standing Committee on the Judiciary – N. J. Lesselyoung, chair
- Assembly Standing Committee on Labor – W. E. Cook, chair
- Assembly Standing Committee on Municipalities – P. A. Luedtke, chair
- Assembly Standing Committee on Printing – F. J. LeClair, chair
- Assembly Standing Committee on Public Welfare – S. H. Raihle, chair
- Assembly Standing Committee on Revision – E. C. Nitschke, chair
- Assembly Standing Committee on Rules – R. G. Marotz, chair
- Assembly Standing Committee on State Affairs – E. A. Toepel, chair
- Assembly Standing Committee on Taxation – W. A. Grady, chair
- Assembly Standing Committee on Third Reading – A. J. Redford, chair
- Assembly Standing Committee on Transportation – L. C. Romell, chair
- Assembly Standing Committee on Veterans and Military Affairs – B. F. Wackett, chair

=== Joint committees ===
- Joint Standing Committee on Finance – F. B. Porter (Sen.) & A. R. Ludvigsen (Asm.), co-chairs
- Joint Standing Committee on Revisions, Repeals, and Uniform Laws – W. Trinke (Sen.) & A. J. Cane (Asm.), co-chairs

== Employees ==
=== Senate employees ===
- Chief Clerk: Lawrence R. Larsen
- Sergeant-at-Arms: Harold Damon
  - Assistant Sergeant-at-Arms: Anton J. Oelmiller

=== Assembly employees ===
- Chief Clerk: Arthur L. May
- Sergeant-at-Arms: Norris J. Kellman

== Changes from the 71st Legislature ==
New districts for the 72nd Legislature were defined in 1951 Wisconsin Act 728, passed into law in the 70th Wisconsin Legislature. This was the most significant redistricting of the state since 1896.

=== Senate redistricting ===
==== Summary of Senate changes ====
- 11 districts were left unchanged.
- Brown County became its own district (2) after previously having been in a shared district with Oconto.
- Dane County went from having 1 district to 2 (16, 26).
- Milwaukee County went from having 7 districts to 8 (3, 4, 5, 6, 7, 8, 9, 11), representing nearly a quarter of State Senate seats.

==== Senate districts ====
Dist.	71st Legislature	72nd Legislature
1	Door, Kewaunee, Manitowoc counties	Door, Kewaunee, Manitowoc counties
2	Brown, Oconto counties	Brown County
3	Milwaukee County (city south)	Milwaukee County (city south)
4	Milwaukee County (northeast)	Milwaukee County (northern quarter)
5	Milwaukee County (city northwest)	Milwaukee County (city northwest)
6	Milwaukee County (city north-central)	Milwaukee County (city northeast)
7	Milwaukee County (southeast)	Milwaukee County (southern quarter)
8	Milwaukee County (west)	Milwaukee County (middle-west)
9	Milwaukee County (city center)	Milwaukee County (city center)
10	Buffalo, Pepin, Pierce, St. Croix counties	Buffalo, Dunn, Pepin, Pierce, St. Croix counties
11	Bayfield, Burnett, Douglas, Washburn counties	Milwaukee County (city west)
12	Ashland, Bayfield, Price, Rusk, Sawyer counties	Ashland, Iron, Price, Rusk, Sawyer, Vilas counties
13	Dodge, Washington counties	Dodge, Washington counties
14	Outagamie, Shawano counties	Outagamie, Waupaca counties
15	Rock County	Rock County
16	Crawford, Grant, Vernon counties	Dane County (excluding Madison)
17	Green, Iowa, Lafayette counties	Grant, Green, Iowa, Lafayette counties
18	Fond du Lac, Green Lake, Waushara counties	Fond du Lac, Green Lake, Waushara counties
19	Calumet, Winnebago counties	Calumet, Winnebago counties
20	Ozaukee, Sheboygan counties	Ozaukee, Sheboygan counties
21	Racine County	Racine County
22	Kenosha, Walworth counties	Kenosha, Walworth counties
23	Portage, Waupaca counties	Barron, Burnett, Polk, Rusk, Sawyer, Washburn counties
24	Clark, Taylor, Wood counties	Clark, Portage, Wood counties
25	Lincoln, Marathon counties	Ashland, Bayfield, Douglas counties
26	Dane County	Dane County (Madison)
27	Columbia, Richland, Sauk counties	Columbia, Crawford, Richland, Sauk counties
28	Chippewa, Eau Claire counties	Chippewa, Eau Claire counties
29	Barron, Dunn, Polk counties	Marathon, Shawano counties
30	Florence, Forest, Langlade, Marinette, Oneida counties	Florence, Forest, Langlade, Marinette, Oconto counties
31	Adams, Juneau, Monroe, Marquette counties	Adams, Juneau, Monroe, Marquette, Vernon counties
32	Jackson, La Crosse, Trempealeau counties	Jackson, La Crosse, Trempealeau counties
33	Jefferson, Waukesha counties	Jefferson, Waukesha counties

=== Assembly redistricting ===
==== Summary of Assembly changes ====
- 36 districts were left unchanged.
- The number of counties in shared districts doubled from 15 to 30.
- Brown County went from having 2 districts to 3.
- Dane County went from having 3 districts to 5.
- Eau Claire County went from having 1 district to 2.
- Milwaukee County went from having 20 districts to 24.
- Rock County went from having 2 districts to 3.
- Winnebago County went from having 2 districts to 3.
- Wood County went from having 1 district to 2.

==== Assembly districts ====
County	Districts in 71st Legislature	Districts in 72nd Legislature	Change
Adams	Shared with Marquette	Shared with Juneau & Marquette	▼
Ashland	1 District	Shared with Bayfield	▼
Barron	1 District	1 District	Steady
Bayfield	1 District	Shared with Ashland	▼
Brown	2 Districts	3 Districts	▲
Buffalo	Shared with Pepin	Shared with Pepin & Pierce	Steady
Burnett	Shared with Washburn	Shared with Polk	Steady
Calumet	1 District	1 District	Steady
Chippewa	1 District	1 District	Steady
Clark	1 District	1 District	Steady
Columbia	1 District	1 District	Steady
Crawford	1 District	Shared with Richland	▼
Dane	3 Districts	5 Districts	▲▲
Dodge	2 Districts	2 Districts	Steady
Door	1 District	Shared with Kewaunee	▼
Douglas	2 Districts	2 Districts	Steady
Dunn	1 District	1 District	Steady
Eau Claire	1 District	2 Districts	▲
Florence	Shared with Forest & Oneida	Shared with Forest & Langlade	Steady
Fond du Lac	2 Districts	2 Districts	Steady
Forest	Shared with Florence & Oneida	Shared with Florence & Langlade	Steady
Grant	2 Districts	1 District	▼
Green	1 District	1 District	Steady
Green Lake	Shared with Waushara	Shared with Waushara	Steady
Iowa	1 District	Shared with Lafayette	▼
Iron	Shared with Vilas	Shared with Oneida & Vilas	Steady
Jackson	1 District	Shared with Trempealeau	▼
Jefferson	1 District	1 District	Steady
Juneau	1 District	Shared with Adams & Marquette	▼
Kenosha	2 Districts	2 Districts	Steady
Kewaunee	1 District	Shared with Door	▼
La Crosse	2 Districts	2 Districts	Steady
Lafayette	1 District	Shared with Iowa	▼
Langlade	1 District	Shared with Florence & Forest	▼
Lincoln	1 District	1 District	Steady
Manitowoc	2 Districts	2 Districts	Steady
Marathon	2 Districts	2 Districts	Steady
Marinette	1 District	1 District	Steady
Marquette	Shared with Adams	Shared with Adams & Juneau	▼
Milwaukee	20 Districts	24 Districts	▲▲▲
Monroe	1 District	1 District	Steady
Oconto	1 District	1 District	Steady
Oneida	Shared with Florence & Forest	Shared with Iron & Vilas	Steady
Outagamie	2 Districts	2 Districts	Steady
Ozaukee	1 District	1 District	Steady
Pepin	Shared with Buffalo	Shared with Buffalo & Pierce	Steady
Pierce	1 District	Shared with Buffalo & Pepin	▼
Polk	1 District	Shared with Burnett	▼
Portage	1 District	1 District	Steady
Price	1 District	Shared with Taylor	▼
Racine	3 Districts	3 Districts	Steady
Richland	1 District	Shared with Crawford	▼
Rock	2 Districts	3 Districts	▲
Rusk	Shared with Sawyer	Shared with Sawyer & Washburn	Steady
Sauk	1 District	1 District	Steady
Sawyer	Shared with Rusk	Shared with Rusk & Washburn	Steady
Shawano	1 District	1 District	Steady
Sheboygan	2 Districts	2 Districts	Steady
St. Croix	1 District	1 District	Steady
Taylor	1 District	Shared with Price	▼
Trempealeau	1 District	Shared with Jackson	▼
Vernon	1 District	1 District	Steady
Vilas	Shared with Iron	Shared with Iron & Oneida	Steady
Walworth	1 District	1 District	Steady
Washburn	Shared with Burnett	Shared with Rusk & Sawyer	Steady
Washington	1 District	1 District	Steady
Waukesha	2 Districts	2 Districts	Steady
Waupaca	1 District	1 District	Steady
Waushara	Shared with Green Lake	Shared with Green Lake	Steady
Winnebago	2 Districts	3 Districts	▲
Wood	1 District	2 District	▲
