= 73rd Wisconsin Legislature =

Wisconsin legislative term for 1955–1956

←	72nd	74th	→
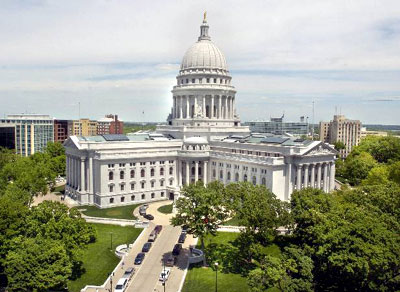
- Wisconsin State Capitol

Overview
- Legislative body: Wisconsin Legislature
- Meeting place: Wisconsin State Capitol
- Term: January 7, 1957 – January 5, 1959
- Election: November 6, 1956

Senate
- Members: 33
- Senate President: Warren P. Knowles (R)
- President pro tempore: Frank E. Panzer (R)
- Party control: Republican

Assembly
- Members: 100
- Assembly Speaker: Robert G. Marotz (R)
- Party control: Republican

Sessions
- Regular: January 9, 1957 – September 27, 1957

Special sessions
- Jun. 1958 Spec.: June 11, 1958 – June 13, 1958

The Seventy-Third Wisconsin Legislature convened from January 9, 1957, to September 27, 1957, in regular session, and reconvened in a special session in June 1958.

Senators representing even-numbered districts were newly elected for this session and were serving the first two years of a four-year term. Assembly members were elected to a two-year term. Assembly members and even-numbered senators were elected in the general election of November 6, 1956. Senators representing odd-numbered districts were serving the third and fourth year of a four-year term, having been elected in the general election of November 2, 1954.

The governor of Wisconsin during this entire term was Republican Vernon W. Thomson, of Richland County, serving a two-year term, having won election in the 1956 Wisconsin gubernatorial election.

== Major events ==
- January 7, 1957:
  - Inauguration of Vernon W. Thomson as the 34th Governor of Wisconsin.
  - John E. Martin became chief justice of the Wisconsin Supreme Court by seniority rule at the expiration of Edward T. Fairchild's term.
- January 20, 1957: Second inauguration of Dwight D. Eisenhower as President of the United States.
- May 2, 1957: Wisconsin's senior United States senator, Joseph McCarthy, died in office.
- August 28, 1957: William Proxmire (D) elected United States senator from Wisconsin.
- September 9, 1957: U.S. President Dwight D. Eisenhower signed the Civil Rights Act of 1957 into law.
- October 4, 1957: The Soviet Union launched Sputnik 1, the first artificial satellite to orbit the Earth.
- October 10, 1957: The Milwaukee Braves won the 1957 World Series.
- November 3, 1957: The Soviet Union launched Sputnik 2, carrying the first animal to orbit the Earth.
- January 22, 1958: Wisconsin U.S. representative Lawrence H. Smith (WI-01) died in office.
- January 31, 1958: The United States launched Explorer 1, its first successful satellite.
- March 8, 1958: The USS Wisconsin (BB-64) was decommissioned, leaving the U.S. Navy without an active battleship for the first time since 1896.
- July 29, 1958: U.S. President Dwight D. Eisenhower signed the National Aeronautics and Space Act, establishing NASA.
- October 9, 1958: Pope Pius XII died.
- October 28, 1958: The 1958 papal conclave elected Cardinal Angelo Giuseppe Roncalli as the next pope, he then took the papal name John XXIII.
- November 4, 1958: 1958 United States general election:
  - Gaylord Nelson (D) elected Governor of Wisconsin.
  - William Proxmire (D) re-elected United States senator from Wisconsin.

== Major legislation ==
- 1957 Joint Resolution 32: First legislative passage of a proposed amendment to the state constitution to set a county and municipal debt limit of five percent of taxable property. This amendment was eventually ratified at the November 1960 election.
- 1957 Joint Resolution 58: First legislative passage of a proposed amendment to the state constitution to allow the state to take on debt to pay for port improvements. This amendment was eventually ratified at the April 1960 election.

== Party summary ==
=== Senate summary ===
Senate partisan composition Democratic: 10 seats Republican: 23 seats

	Party (Shading indicates majority caucus)		Total	
	Dem.	Rep.	Total	Vacant
End of previous Legislature	8	23	31	2
Start of Reg. Session	10	23	33	0
From Aug. 19, 1957 (Note: Republican Louis H. Prange (20th District) died.)	10	22	32	1
Final voting share	31.25%	68.75%		
Beginning of the next Legislature	13	20	33	0

=== Assembly summary ===
Assembly partisan composition Democratic: 33 seats Republican: 67 seats

	Party (Shading indicates majority caucus)		Total	
	Dem.	Rep.	Total	Vacant
End of previous Legislature	35	63	98	2
Start of Reg. Session	33	67	100	0
From Jul. 10, 1957 (Note: Republican Fred H. Frank (Outagamie County) died.)	33	66	99	1
Final voting share	33.33%	66.67%		
Beginning of the next Legislature	55	45	100	0

== Sessions ==
- Regular session: January 9, 1957 – September 27, 1957
- June 1958 special session: June 11, 1958 – June 13, 1958

== Leaders ==
=== Senate leadership ===
- President of the Senate: Warren P. Knowles (R)
- President pro tempore: Frank E. Panzer (R–Oakfield)
- Majority leader: Robert S. Travis (R–Platteville)
- Minority leader: Henry Maier (D–Milwaukee)

=== Assembly leadership ===
- Speaker of the Assembly: Robert G. Marotz (R–Shawano)
- Majority leader: Warren A. Grady (R–Port Washington)
- Minority leader: Robert T. Huber (D–West Allis)

== Members ==
=== Members of the Senate ===
Members of the Senate for the Seventy-Third Wisconsin Legislature:

Senate partisan representation Democratic: 10 seats Republican: 23 seats

Dist.	Counties	Senator	Residence	Party
01	Door, Kewaunee, & Manitowoc	Alfred A. Laun Jr.	Kiel	Rep.
02	Brown	Leo P. O'Brien	Green Bay	Rep.
03	Milwaukee (South City)	Casimir Kendziorski	Milwaukee	Dem.
04	Milwaukee (North County)	Kirby Hendee	Milwaukee	Rep.
05	Milwaukee (Northwest City)	Walter L. Merten	Milwaukee	Rep.
06	Milwaukee (Northeast City)	William R. Moser	Milwaukee	Dem.
07	Milwaukee (South County & Southeast City)	Leland McParland	Cudahy	Dem.
08	Milwaukee (Western County)	Allen Busby	West Milwaukee	Rep.
09	Milwaukee (City Downtown)	Henry Maier	Milwaukee	Dem.
10	Buffalo, Dunn, Pepin, Pierce, & St. Croix	Robert P. Knowles	New Richmond	Rep.
11	Milwaukee (Western City)	Richard J. Zaborski	Milwaukee	Dem.
12	Iron, Lincoln, Oneida, Price, Taylor, & Vilas	Clifford Krueger	Merrill	Rep.
13	Dodge & Washington	Frank E. Panzer	Oakfield	Rep.
14	Outagamie & Waupaca	Gerald Lorge	Bear Creek	Rep.
15	Rock	Peter P. Carr	Janesville	Rep.
16	Dane (Excluding Madison)	Gaylord Nelson	Madison	Dem.
17	Grant, Green, Iowa, & Lafayette	Robert S. Travis	Platteville	Rep.
18	Fond du Lac, Green Lake & Waushara	Walter G. Hollander	Rosendale	Rep.
19	Calumet & Winnebago	William Draheim	Neenah	Rep.
20	Ozaukee & Sheboygan	Louis H. Prange (died Aug. 19, 1957)	Plymouth	Rep.
21	Racine	Lynn E. Stalbaum	Racine	Dem.
22	Kenosha & Walworth	William Trinke	Lake Geneva	Rep.
23	Barron, Burnett, Polk, Rusk, Sawyer, & Washburn	Holger Rasmusen	Spooner	Rep.
24	Clark, Portage, & Wood	William W. Clark	Vesper	Rep.
25	Ashland, Bayfield, & Douglas	Carl Lauri	Merrill	Dem.
26	Dane (Madison)	Horace W. Wilkie	Madison	Dem.
27	Columbia, Crawford, Richland, & Sauk	Jess Miller	Richland Center	Rep.
28	Chippewa & Eau Claire	Davis A. Donnelly	Eau Claire	Dem.
29	Marathon & Shawano	Hugh M. Jones	Wausau	Rep.
30	Florence, Forest, Langlade, Marinette, & Oconto	Reuben La Fave	Oconto	Rep.
31	Adams, Juneau, Monroe, Marquette, & Vernon	J. Earl Leverich	Sparta	Rep.
32	Jackson, La Crosse, & Trempealeau	Raymond Bice Sr.	La Crosse	Rep.
33	Jefferson & Waukesha	Chester Dempsey	Hartland	Rep.

=== Members of the Assembly ===
Members of the Assembly for the Seventy-Third Wisconsin Legislature:

Assembly partisan composition Democratic: 33 seats Republican: 67 seats

Milwaukee County districts

Senate Dist.	County	Dist.	Representative	Party	Residence
31	Adams, Juneau, & Marquette		Ben Tremain	Rep.	Hustler
25	Ashland & Bayfield		Vic C. Wallin	Rep.	Grand View
23	Barron		Charles H. Sykes	Rep.	Cameron
02	Brown	1	Jerome Quinn	Rep.	Green Bay
02	Brown	2	Robert E. Lynch	Dem.	Green Bay
02	Brown	3	Edward A. Seymour	Rep.	De Pere
10	Buffalo, Pepin, & Pierce		Mamre H. Ward	Rep.	Durand
23	Burnett & Polk		Lowell A. Nelson	Rep.	Grantsburg
19	Calumet		Henry M. Peters	Rep.	Menasha
28	Chippewa		Wilder W. Crane Jr.	Rep.	Chippewa Falls
24	Clark		Corwin C. Guell	Rep.	Thorp
27	Columbia		Everett Bidwell	Rep.	Portage
27	Crawford & Richland		Milford C. Kintz	Rep.	Richland Center
26	Dane	1	Norman C. Anderson	Dem.	Madison
26	Dane	2	Fred A. Risser	Dem.	Madison
26	Dane	3	Carroll Metzner	Rep.	Madison
16	Dane	4	Carl W. Thompson	Dem.	Stoughton
16	Dane	5	Ervin M. Bruner	Dem.	Verona
13	Dodge	1	Elmer L. Genzmer	Rep.	Mayville
13	Dodge	2	Elmer C. Nitschke	Rep.	Beaver Dam
01	Door & Kewaunee		Frank N. Graass	Rep.	Sturgeon Bay
25	Douglas	1	Reino A. Perala	Dem.	Superior
25	Douglas	2	Lawrence M. Hagen	Rep.	Superior
10	Dunn		William E. Owen	Rep.	Menomonie
28	Eau Claire	1	Dennis B. Danielson	Rep.	Eau Claire
28	Eau Claire	2	John T. Pritchard	Rep.	Eau Claire
30	Florence, Forest, & Langlade		Alfred J. Lauby	Dem.	Antigo
18	Fond du Lac	1	Earl F. McEssy	Rep.	Fond du Lac
18	Fond du Lac	2	Fred W. Schlueter	Rep.	Ripon
17	Grant		Hugh A. Harper	Rep.	Lancaster
17	Green		Christian M. Stauffer	Rep.	Monticello
18	Green Lake & Waushara		Franklin M. Jahnke	Rep.	Markesan
17	Iowa & Lafayette		Walter B. Calvert	Rep.	Benton
12	Iron, Oneida, & Vilas		Marvin E. Dillman	Rep.	Lac du Flambeau
32	Jackson & Trempealeau		Keith C. Hardie	Dem.	Taylor
33	Jefferson		Byron F. Wackett	Rep.	Watertown
22	Kenosha	1	George Molinaro	Dem.	Kenosha
22	Kenosha	2	Earl D. Morton	Rep.	Kenosha
32	La Crosse	1	James D. H. Peterson	Rep.	La Crosse
32	La Crosse	2	Eugene A. Toepel	Rep.	La Crosse
12	Lincoln		Emil A. Hinz	Rep.	Merrill
01	Manitowoc	1	Hugo E. Vogel	Dem.	Manitowoc
01	Manitowoc	2	Ewald J. Schmeichel	Rep.	Two Rivers
29	Marathon	1	Ben A. Riehle	Dem.	Athens
29	Marathon	2	Paul A. Luedtke	Rep.	Wausau
30	Marinette		Robert Haase	Rep.	Marinette
04	Milwaukee	1	Louis L. Merz	Dem.	Milwaukee
09	Milwaukee	2	Norman Sussman	Dem.	Milwaukee
09	Milwaukee	3	Joseph A. Greco	Dem.	Milwaukee
11	Milwaukee	4	Joseph P. Murphy	Dem.	Milwaukee
05	Milwaukee	5	Lawrence W. Timmerman	Rep.	Milwaukee
09	Milwaukee	6	Isaac N. Coggs	Dem.	Milwaukee
06	Milwaukee	7	Allen J. Flannigan	Dem.	Milwaukee
11	Milwaukee	8	George Talsky	Dem.	Milwaukee
05	Milwaukee	9	Charles J. Schmidt	Dem.	Milwaukee
06	Milwaukee	10	Michael F. O'Connell	Dem.	Milwaukee
03	Milwaukee	11	Ervin J. Ryczek	Dem.	Milwaukee
03	Milwaukee	12	George Sokolowski	Dem.	Milwaukee
06	Milwaukee	13	Marty Larsen	Dem.	Milwaukee
03	Milwaukee	14	David Mogilka	Dem.	Milwaukee
05	Milwaukee	15	Earle W. Fricker	Rep.	Milwaukee
11	Milwaukee	16	Thomas J. Duffey	Dem.	Milwaukee
07	Milwaukee	17	Howard F. Pellant	Dem.	Milwaukee
04	Milwaukee	18	John R. Meyer	Rep.	Milwaukee
04	Milwaukee	19	Jerris Leonard	Rep.	Bayside
08	Milwaukee	20	Glen Pommerening	Rep.	Wauwatosa
08	Milwaukee	21	Robert R. Heider	Rep.	West Allis
08	Milwaukee	22	Robert T. Huber	Dem.	West Allis
07	Milwaukee	23	William Luebke	Dem.	Milwaukee
07	Milwaukee	24	Sherman R. Sobocinski	Dem.	South Milwaukee
31	Monroe		Kyle Kenyon	Rep.	Tomah
30	Oconto		Lloyd R. Baumgart	Rep.	Lena
14	Outagamie	1	Fred H. Frank (died Jul. 10, 1957)	Rep.	Appleton
14	Outagamie	2	William T. Sullivan	Rep.	Kaukauna
20	Ozaukee		Warren A. Grady	Rep.	Port Washington
24	Portage		John Kostuck	Dem.	Stevens Point
12	Price & Taylor		Vincent J. Zellinger	Rep.	Phillips
21	Racine	1	Earl W. Warren	Dem.	Racine
21	Racine	2	Roy E. Naleid	Dem.	Racine
21	Racine	3	Anthony B. Rewald	Rep.	Burlington
15	Rock	1	William Merriam	Rep.	Janesville
15	Rock	2	David Blanchard	Rep.	Edgerton
15	Rock	3	George B. Belting	Rep.	Beloit
23	Rusk, Sawyer, & Washburn		Willis J. Hutnik	Rep.	Tony
27	Sauk		James R. Stone	Rep.	Reedsburg
29	Shawano		Robert G. Marotz	Rep.	Shawano
20	Sheboygan	1	Walter R. Schmidt	Rep.	Sheboygan
20	Sheboygan	2	Harold F. Huibregtse	Rep.	Sheboygan Falls
10	St. Croix		William W. Ward	Dem.	New Richmond
16	Vernon		Bernard Lewison	Rep.	Viroqua
22	Walworth		Ora R. Rice	Rep.	Delavan
13	Washington		Elmer J. Schowalter	Rep.	Jackson
33	Waukesha	1	Alvin J. Redford	Rep.	Waukesha
33	Waukesha	2	Harold W. Clemens	Rep.	Oconomowoc
14	Waupaca		Richard E. Peterson	Rep.	Clintonville
19	Winnebago	1	Harvey R. Abraham	Rep.	Oshkosh
19	Winnebago	2	Joseph H. Anderson	Rep.	Winneconne
19	Winnebago	3	Arnold J. Cane	Rep.	Menasha
24	Wood	1	John S. Crawford	Rep.	Marshfield
24	Wood	2	Arthur J. Crowns	Rep.	Wisconsin Rapids

== Committees ==
=== Senate committees ===
- Senate Standing Committee on Agriculture – H. M. Jones, chair
- Senate Standing Committee on Conservation – C. Krueger, chair
- Senate Standing Committee on Education – W. W. Clark, chair
- Senate Standing Committee on Governmental and Veterans Affairs – L. P. O'Brien, chair
- Senate Standing Committee on Highways – J. Miller, chair
- Senate Standing Committee on Interstate Cooperation – F. E. Panzer, chair
- Senate Standing Committee on the Judiciary – W. L. Merten, chair
- Senate Standing Committee on Labor, Taxation, Insurance, and Banking – W. Trinke, chair
- Senate Standing Committee on Public Welfare – P. P. Carr, chair
- Senate Special Committee on Committees – J. Miller, chair
- Senate Special Committee on Contingent Expenditures – L. H. Prange, chair
- Senate Special Committee on Legislative Procedure – F. E. Panzer, chair

=== Assembly committees ===
- Assembly Standing Committee on Agriculture – O. R. Rice, chair
- Assembly Standing Committee on Commerce and Manufactures – J. S. Crawford, chair
- Assembly Standing Committee on Conservation – M. E. Dillman, chair
- Assembly Standing Committee on Contingent Expenditures – B. Lewison, chair
- Assembly Standing Committee on Education – W. B. Calvert, chair
- Assembly Standing Committee on Elections – V. C. Wallin, chair
- Assembly Standing Committee on Engrossed Bills – M. C. Kintz, chair
- Assembly Standing Committee on Enrolled Bills – C. H. Sykes, chair
- Assembly Standing Committee on Excise and Fees – H. R. Abraham, chair
- Assembly Standing Committee on Highways – E. C. Nitschke, chair
- Assembly Standing Committee on Insurance and Banking – R. E. Peterson, chair
- Assembly Standing Committee on the Judiciary – E. A. Toepel, chair
- Assembly Standing Committee on Labor – E. L. Genzmer, chair
- Assembly Standing Committee on Municipalities – P. A. Luedtke, chair
- Assembly Standing Committee on Printing – E. A. Hinz, chair
- Assembly Standing Committee on Public Welfare – M. H. Ward, chair
- Assembly Standing Committee on Revision – A. J. Redford, chair
- Assembly Standing Committee on Rules – W. A. Grady, chair
- Assembly Standing Committee on State Affairs – D. Blanchard, chair
- Assembly Standing Committee on Taxation – G. Pommerening, chair
- Assembly Standing Committee on Third Reading – H. M. Peters, chair
- Assembly Standing Committee on Transportation – L. M. Hagen, chair
- Assembly Standing Committee on Veterans and Military Affairs – B. F. Wackett, chair

=== Joint committees ===
- Joint Standing Committee on Finance – A. A. Laun (Sen.) & J. R. Stone (Asm.), co-chairs
- Joint Standing Committee on Revisions, Repeals, and Uniform Laws – A. Busby (Sen.) & A. J. Cane (Asm.), co-chairs
- Joint Legislative Council – R. G. Marotz, chair

== Employees ==
=== Senate employees ===
- Chief Clerk: Lawrence R. Larsen
- Sergeant-at-Arms: Harold Damon

=== Assembly employees ===
- Chief Clerk: Arthur L. May
- Sergeant-at-Arms: Norris J. Kellman
