= 74th Wisconsin Legislature =

Wisconsin legislative term for 1959–1960

←	73rd	75th	→
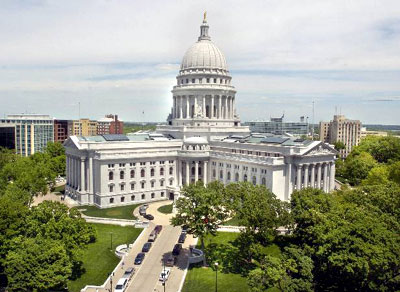
- Wisconsin State Capitol

Overview
- Legislative body: Wisconsin Legislature
- Meeting place: Wisconsin State Capitol
- Term: January 5, 1959 – January 2, 1961
- Election: November 4, 1958

Senate
- Members: 33
- Senate President: Philleo Nash (D)
- President pro tempore: Frank E. Panzer (R)
- Party control: Republican

Assembly
- Members: 100
- Assembly Speaker: George Molinaro (D)
- Party control: Democratic

Sessions
- Regular: January 14, 1959 – May 27, 1960

The Seventy-Fourth Wisconsin Legislature convened from January 14, 1959, to May 27, 1960, in regular session.

Senators representing odd-numbered districts were newly elected for this session and were serving the first two years of a four-year term. Assembly members were elected to a two-year term. Assembly members and odd-numbered senators were elected in the general election of November 4, 1958. Senators representing even-numbered districts were serving the third and fourth year of a four-year term, having been elected in the general election of November 6, 1956.

The governor of Wisconsin during this entire term was Democrat Gaylord Nelson, of Dane County, serving a two-year term, having won election in the 1958 Wisconsin gubernatorial election.

== Major events ==
- January 5, 1959: Inauguration of Gaylord Nelson as the 35th Governor of Wisconsin.
- February 16, 1959: Fidel Castro became premier of Cuba.
- April 25, 1959: The St. Lawrence Seaway opened to traffic, linking the Great Lakes to the Atlantic Ocean.
- August 21, 1959: Hawaii was admitted as the 50th U.S. state.
- April 5, 1960: Voters approved an amendment to the state constitution to allow the state to take on debt to pay for port improvements.
- May 6, 1960: U.S. President Dwight D. Eisenhower signed the Civil Rights Act of 1960 into law.
- September 14, 1960: The Organization of Petroleum Exporting Countries (OPEC) was founded by Iran, Iraq, Kuwait, Saudi Arabia, and Venezuela.
- November 8, 1960: 1960 United States general election:
  - John F. Kennedy (D) elected President of the United States.
  - Gaylord Nelson (D) re-elected Governor of Wisconsin.
  - Wisconsin voters approved an amendment to the state constitution to set a county and municipal debt limit of five percent of taxable property.

== Major legislation ==
- July 24, 1959: An Act ... relating to group health insurance and the group life insurance program for state employes, granting rule-making authority and making an appropriation, 1959 Act 211. Created group life and health insurance programs for state employees.
- July 31, 1959: An Act ... relating to the abolition of the department of budget and accounts, bureau of engineering, bureau of personnel, bureau of purchases, division of departmental research and the creation of a state department of administration, a board on government operations and making appropriations, 1959 Act 228. Created the Wisconsin Department of Administration.
- September 19, 1959: An Act ... relating to the abolition of the state planning division, division of industrial development, the creation of a department of resource development, and increasing the appropriation to the university of Wisconsin, 1959 Act 442. Created the Wisconsin Department of Resource Development.
- October 2, 1959: An Act ... relating to rights of employes of local units of government to form and join labor organizations, 1959 Act 509. Allowed Wisconsin municipal employees to unionize.
- 1959 Joint Resolution 15: Second legislative passage of a proposed amendment to the state constitution to allow the state to take on debt to pay for port improvements. This amendment was ratified at the April 1960 election.
- 1959 Joint Resolution 32: Second legislative passage of a proposed amendment to the state constitution to set a county and municipal debt limit of five percent of taxable property. This amendment was ratified at the November 1960 election.

== Party summary ==
=== Senate summary ===
Senate partisan composition Democratic: 13 seats Republican: 20 seats

	Party (Shading indicates majority caucus)		Total	
	Dem.	Rep.	Total	Vacant
End of previous Legislature	10	22	32	1
Start of Reg. Session	13	20	33	0
Final voting share	39.39%	60.61%		
Beginning of the next Legislature	13	20	33	0

=== Assembly summary ===
Assembly partisan composition Democratic: 55 seats Republican: 45 seats

	Party (Shading indicates majority caucus)		Total	
	Dem.	Rep.	Total	Vacant
End of previous Legislature	33	66	99	1
Start of Reg. Session	55	45	100	0
From Apr. 23, 1960 (Note: Democrat Robert M. Curley (Milwaukee County) resigned to accept appointment as a Wisconsin circuit court judge.)	54	45	99	1
Final voting share	54.55%	45.45%		
Beginning of the next Legislature	45	55	100	0

== Sessions ==
- Regular session: January 14, 1959 – May 27, 1960

== Leaders ==
=== Senate leadership ===
- President of the Senate: Philleo Nash (D)
- President pro tempore: Frank E. Panzer (R–Oakfield)
- Majority leader: Robert S. Travis (R–Platteville)
- Minority leader: Henry Maier (D–Milwaukee)

=== Assembly leadership ===
- Speaker of the Assembly: George Molinaro (D–Kenosha)
- Majority leader: Keith C. Hardie (D–Taylor)
- Minority leader: David Blanchard (R–Edgerton)

== Members ==
=== Members of the Senate ===
Members of the Senate for the Seventy-Fourth Wisconsin Legislature:

Senate partisan representation Democratic: 13 seats Republican: 20 seats

Dist.	Counties	Senator	Residence	Party
01	Door, Kewaunee, & Manitowoc	Alfred A. Laun Jr.	Kiel	Rep.
02	Brown	Leo P. O'Brien	Green Bay	Rep.
03	Milwaukee (South City)	Casimir Kendziorski	Milwaukee	Dem.
04	Milwaukee (North County)	Kirby Hendee	Milwaukee	Rep.
05	Milwaukee (Northwest City)	James B. Brennan	Milwaukee	Dem.
06	Milwaukee (Northeast City)	William R. Moser	Milwaukee	Dem.
07	Milwaukee (South County & Southeast City)	Leland McParland	Cudahy	Dem.
08	Milwaukee (Western County)	Allen Busby	West Milwaukee	Rep.
09	Milwaukee (City Downtown)	Henry Maier	Milwaukee	Dem.
10	Buffalo, Dunn, Pepin, Pierce, & St. Croix	Robert P. Knowles	New Richmond	Rep.
11	Milwaukee (Western City)	Richard J. Zaborski	Milwaukee	Dem.
12	Iron, Lincoln, Oneida, Price, Taylor, & Vilas	Clifford Krueger	Merrill	Rep.
13	Dodge & Washington	Frank E. Panzer	Oakfield	Rep.
14	Outagamie & Waupaca	Gerald Lorge	Bear Creek	Rep.
15	Rock	Peter P. Carr	Janesville	Rep.
16	Dane (Excluding Madison)	Carl W. Thompson	Stoughton	Dem.
17	Grant, Green, Iowa, & Lafayette	Robert S. Travis	Platteville	Rep.
18	Fond du Lac, Green Lake & Waushara	Walter G. Hollander	Rosendale	Rep.
19	Calumet & Winnebago	William Draheim	Neenah	Rep.
20	Ozaukee & Sheboygan	Harold F. Huibregtse	Sheboygan Falls	Rep.
21	Racine	Lynn E. Stalbaum	Racine	Dem.
22	Kenosha & Walworth	William Trinke	Lake Geneva	Rep.
23	Barron, Burnett, Polk, Rusk, Sawyer, & Washburn	Howard W. Cameron	Rice Lake	Dem.
24	Clark, Portage, & Wood	William W. Clark	Vesper	Rep.
25	Ashland, Bayfield, & Douglas	Carl Lauri	Merrill	Dem.
26	Dane (Madison)	Horace W. Wilkie	Madison	Dem.
27	Columbia, Crawford, Richland, & Sauk	Jess Miller	Richland Center	Rep.
28	Chippewa & Eau Claire	Davis A. Donnelly	Eau Claire	Dem.
29	Marathon & Shawano	Robert W. Dean	Rothschild	Dem.
30	Florence, Forest, Langlade, Marinette, & Oconto	Reuben La Fave	Oconto	Rep.
31	Adams, Juneau, Monroe, Marquette, & Vernon	J. Earl Leverich	Sparta	Rep.
32	Jackson, La Crosse, & Trempealeau	Raymond Bice Sr.	La Crosse	Rep.
33	Jefferson & Waukesha	Chester Dempsey	Hartland	Rep.

=== Members of the Assembly ===
Members of the Assembly for the Seventy-Fourth Wisconsin Legislature:

Assembly partisan composition Democratic: 55 seats Republican: 45 seats

Milwaukee County districts

Senate Dist.	County	Dist.	Representative	Party	Residence
31	Adams, Juneau, & Marquette		Ben Tremain	Rep.	Hustler
25	Ashland & Bayfield		Robert F. Barabe	Dem.	Mellen
23	Barron		George Mireau	Rep.	Rice Lake
02	Brown	1	Jerome Quinn	Rep.	Green Bay
02	Brown	2	Adolph A. Deering	Rep.	Green Bay
02	Brown	3	Cletus J. Vanderperren	Dem.	Green Bay
10	Buffalo, Pepin, & Pierce		Edwin Rohl	Dem.	Prescott
23	Burnett & Polk		Harvey L. Dueholm	Dem.	Luck
19	Calumet		Gilbert Hipke	Rep.	New Holstein
28	Chippewa		Clifford E. Dorr	Dem.	Chippewa Falls
24	Clark		Frank Nikolay	Dem.	Abbotsford
27	Columbia		Everett Bidwell	Rep.	Portage
27	Crawford & Richland		Frank J. Cosgrove	Dem.	Richland Center
26	Dane	1	Glenn L. Henry	Dem.	Madison
26	Dane	2	Fred A. Risser	Dem.	Madison
26	Dane	3	Richard Cates	Dem.	Madison
16	Dane	4	Jerome L. Blaska	Dem.	Sun Prairie
16	Dane	5	David D. O'Malley	Dem.	Waunakee
13	Dodge	1	Elmer L. Genzmer	Rep.	Mayville
13	Dodge	2	Elmer C. Nitschke	Rep.	Beaver Dam
01	Door & Kewaunee		Frank N. Graass	Rep.	Sturgeon Bay
25	Douglas	1	Reino A. Perala	Dem.	Superior
25	Douglas	2	Frank Christopherson Jr.	Dem.	Superior
10	Dunn		Einer P. Lund	Dem.	Menomonie
28	Eau Claire	1	Karl J. Goethel	Dem.	Eau Claire
28	Eau Claire	2	John T. Pritchard	Dem.	Eau Claire
30	Florence, Forest, & Langlade		John R. Gray	Dem.	Antigo
18	Fond du Lac	1	Earl F. McEssy	Rep.	Fond du Lac
18	Fond du Lac	2	Fred W. Schlueter	Rep.	Ripon
17	Grant		Hugh A. Harper	Rep.	Lancaster
17	Green		Christian M. Stauffer	Rep.	Monticello
18	Green Lake & Waushara		Franklin M. Jahnke	Rep.	Markesan
17	Iowa & Lafayette		Walter B. Calvert	Rep.	Benton
12	Iron, Oneida, & Vilas		Paul Alfonsi	Rep.	Minocqua
32	Jackson & Trempealeau		Keith C. Hardie	Dem.	Taylor
33	Jefferson		Byron F. Wackett	Rep.	Watertown
22	Kenosha	1	George Molinaro	Dem.	Kenosha
22	Kenosha	2	Earl D. Morton	Rep.	Kenosha
32	La Crosse	1	James D. H. Peterson	Rep.	La Crosse
32	La Crosse	2	Leland E. Mulder	Dem.	Holmen
12	Lincoln		Emil A. Hinz	Rep.	Merrill
01	Manitowoc	1	Hugo E. Vogel	Dem.	Manitowoc
01	Manitowoc	2	Ewald J. Schmeichel	Rep.	Two Rivers
29	Marathon	1	Ben A. Riehle	Dem.	Athens
29	Marathon	2	Paul A. Luedtke	Rep.	Wausau
30	Marinette		Robert Haase	Rep.	Marinette
04	Milwaukee	1	Louis L. Merz	Dem.	Milwaukee
09	Milwaukee	2	Norman Sussman	Dem.	Milwaukee
09	Milwaukee	3	Joseph A. Greco	Dem.	Milwaukee
11	Milwaukee	4	Frank E. Schaeffer Jr.	Dem.	Milwaukee
05	Milwaukee	5	Lawrence W. Timmerman	Rep.	Milwaukee
09	Milwaukee	6	Isaac N. Coggs	Dem.	Milwaukee
06	Milwaukee	7	Allen J. Flannigan	Dem.	Milwaukee
11	Milwaukee	8	George Talsky	Dem.	Milwaukee
05	Milwaukee	9	Charles J. Schmidt	Dem.	Milwaukee
06	Milwaukee	10	Patrick H. Kelly	Dem.	Milwaukee
03	Milwaukee	11	Ervin J. Ryczek	Dem.	Milwaukee
03	Milwaukee	12	George Sokolowski	Dem.	Milwaukee
06	Milwaukee	13	Marty Larsen	Dem.	Milwaukee
03	Milwaukee	14	David Mogilka	Dem.	Milwaukee
05	Milwaukee	15	Wilfred Schuele	Dem.	Milwaukee
11	Milwaukee	16	Thomas J. Duffey	Dem.	Milwaukee
07	Milwaukee	17	Howard F. Pellant	Dem.	Milwaukee
04	Milwaukee	18	Robert M. Curley (res. Apr. 23, 1960)	Dem.	Milwaukee
04	Milwaukee	19	Jerris Leonard	Rep.	Bayside
08	Milwaukee	20	Glen Pommerening	Rep.	Wauwatosa
08	Milwaukee	21	Robert A. Collins	Dem.	Wauwatosa
08	Milwaukee	22	Robert T. Huber	Dem.	West Allis
07	Milwaukee	23	William Luebke	Dem.	Milwaukee
07	Milwaukee	24	Sherman R. Sobocinski	Dem.	South Milwaukee
31	Monroe		Kyle Kenyon	Rep.	Tomah
30	Oconto		Lloyd R. Baumgart	Rep.	Lena
14	Outagamie	1	Kenneth E. Priebe	Rep.	Appleton
14	Outagamie	2	William T. Sullivan	Rep.	Kaukauna
20	Ozaukee		Warren A. Grady	Rep.	Port Washington
24	Portage		John Kostuck	Dem.	Stevens Point
12	Price & Taylor		Andrew F. Warga	Dem.	Phillips
21	Racine	1	Earl W. Warren	Dem.	Racine
21	Racine	2	Roy E. Naleid	Dem.	Racine
21	Racine	3	John R. Hansen	Dem.	Raymond
15	Rock	1	William Merriam	Rep.	Janesville
15	Rock	2	David Blanchard	Rep.	Edgerton
15	Rock	3	George B. Belting	Rep.	Beloit
23	Rusk, Sawyer, & Washburn		Willis J. Hutnik	Rep.	Tony
27	Sauk		Walter Terry	Rep.	Baraboo
29	Shawano		Theodore Abrahamson	Rep.	Tigerton
20	Sheboygan	1	Henry A. Hillemann	Dem.	Sheboygan
20	Sheboygan	2	Walter Ireland	Rep.	Sheboygan
10	St. Croix		William W. Ward	Dem.	New Richmond
16	Vernon		Paul Haugh	Dem.	Hillsboro
22	Walworth		Ora R. Rice	Rep.	Delavan
13	Washington		Elmer J. Schowalter	Rep.	Jackson
33	Waukesha	1	Vincent R. Mathews	Dem.	Waukesha
33	Waukesha	2	Harold W. Clemens	Rep.	Oconomowoc
14	Waupaca		Richard E. Peterson	Rep.	Clintonville
19	Winnebago	1	Harvey R. Abraham	Rep.	Oshkosh
19	Winnebago	2	Floyd E. Shurbert	Rep.	Oshkosh
19	Winnebago	3	Arnold J. Cane	Rep.	Menasha
24	Wood	1	John S. Crawford	Rep.	Marshfield
24	Wood	2	Arthur H. Treutel	Dem.	Wisconsin Rapids

== Committees ==
=== Senate committees ===
- Senate Standing Committee on Agriculture – J. E. Leverich, chair
- Senate Standing Committee on Conservation – C. Krueger, chair
- Senate Standing Committee on Education – W. W. Clark, chair
- Senate Standing Committee on Governmental and Veterans Affairs – L. P. O'Brien, chair
- Senate Standing Committee on Highways – J. Miller, chair
- Senate Standing Committee on Interstate Cooperation – F. E. Panzer, chair
- Senate Standing Committee on the Judiciary – A. Busby, chair
- Senate Standing Committee on Labor, Taxation, Insurance, and Banking – W. Trinke, chair
- Senate Standing Committee on Public Welfare – P. P. Carr, chair
- Senate Special Committee on Committees – J. Miller, chair
- Senate Special Committee on Contingent Expenditures – R. Bice, chair
- Senate Special Committee on Legislative Procedure – F. E. Panzer, chair

=== Assembly committees ===
- Assembly Standing Committee on Agriculture – J. T. Pritchard, chair
- Assembly Standing Committee on Commerce and Manufactures – L. L. Merz, chair
- Assembly Standing Committee on Conservation – H. F. Pellant, chair
- Assembly Standing Committee on Contingent Expenditures – J. Kostuck, chair
- Assembly Standing Committee on Education – K. C. Hardie, chair
- Assembly Standing Committee on Elections – S. R. Sobocinski, chair
- Assembly Standing Committee on Engrossed Bills – G. Talsky, chair
- Assembly Standing Committee on Enrolled Bills – E. W. Warren, chair
- Assembly Standing Committee on Excise and Fees – E. J. Ryczek, chair
- Assembly Standing Committee on Highways – R. T. Huber, chair
- Assembly Standing Committee on Insurance and Banking – G. Sokolowski, chair
- Assembly Standing Committee on the Judiciary – W. W. Ward, chair
- Assembly Standing Committee on Labor – A. J. Flannigan, chair
- Assembly Standing Committee on Municipalities – N. Sussman, chair
- Assembly Standing Committee on Printing – B. A. Riehle, chair
- Assembly Standing Committee on Public Welfare – I. N. Coggs, chair
- Assembly Standing Committee on Revision – D. Mogilka, chair
- Assembly Standing Committee on Rules – K. C. Hardie, chair
- Assembly Standing Committee on State Affairs – C. J. Schmidt, chair
- Assembly Standing Committee on Taxation – R. A. Perala, chair
- Assembly Standing Committee on Third Reading – R. E. Naleid, chair
- Assembly Standing Committee on Transportation – F. Christopherson, chair
- Assembly Standing Committee on Veterans and Military Affairs – J. A. Greco, chair

=== Joint committees ===
- Joint Standing Committee on Finance – W. Draheim (Sen.) & F. A. Risser (Asm.), co-chairs
- Joint Standing Committee on Revisions, Repeals, and Uniform Laws – G. Lorge (Sen.) & T. J. Duffey (Asm.), co-chairs
- Joint Legislative Council – G. Molinaro, chair

== Employees ==
=== Senate employees ===
- Chief Clerk: Lawrence R. Larsen
- Sergeant-at-Arms: Harold Damon

=== Assembly employees ===
- Chief Clerk: Norman C. Anderson
- Sergeant-at-Arms: Thomas H. Browne
