= 71st Wisconsin Legislature =

Wisconsin legislative term for 1953–1954

←	70th	72nd	→
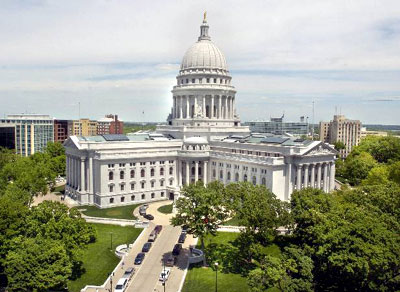
- Wisconsin State Capitol

Overview
- Legislative body: Wisconsin Legislature
- Meeting place: Wisconsin State Capitol
- Term: January 5, 1953 – January 3, 1955
- Election: November 4, 1952

Senate
- Members: 33
- Senate President: George M. Smith (R)
- President pro tempore: Frank E. Panzer (R)
- Party control: Republican

Assembly
- Members: 100
- Assembly Speaker: Ora R. Rice (R)
- Party control: Republican

Sessions
- Regular: January 14, 1953 – November 6, 1953

The Seventy-First Wisconsin Legislature convened from January 14, 1953, to November 6, 1953, in regular session.

During this session, the Legislature attempted to pass another redistricting plan to supersede the "Rosenberry plan" that had passed during the previous session. The Wisconsin Supreme Court ultimately struck down this second plan, finding that the state constitution did not allow for the Legislature to pass more than one redistricting plan per decennial census. The Rosenberry plan went into effect for the 1954 election. This was the first time in 60 years that the court got involved in a Wisconsin redistricting dispute, but it would be the start of a pattern of state and federal courts handling Wisconsin redistricting for subsequent decades.

Senators representing even-numbered districts were newly elected for this session and were serving the first two years of a four-year term. Assembly members were elected to a two-year term. Assembly members and even-numbered senators were elected in the general election of November 4, 1952. Senators representing odd-numbered districts were serving the third and fourth year of a four-year term, having been elected in the general election of November 7, 1950.

The governor of Wisconsin during this entire term was Republican Walter J. Kohler Jr., of Sheboygan County, serving his second two-year term, having won re-election in the 1952 Wisconsin gubernatorial election.

== Major events ==
- January 5, 1953: Second inauguration of Walter J. Kohler Jr. as Governor of Wisconsin.
- January 20, 1953: Inauguration of Dwight D. Eisenhower as 34th President of the United States.
- March 5, 1953: Joseph Stalin, the premier of the Soviet Union, died after suffering a stroke.
- March 18, 1953: Major League Baseball's National League approved the relocation of the Boston Braves franchise to Milwaukee.
- March 26, 1953: Jonas Salk announced his polio vaccine.
- April 7, 1953: Wisconsin voters approved two amendments to the state constitution:
  - Changing the apportionment rules for legislative districts to include consideration of district size alongside consideration of population.
  - Changing judicial term rules so that judicial special elections would be for a new full term, rather than for the remaining years on the previous incomplete term.
- April 13, 1953: The Milwaukee Braves Major League Baseball team played their first game at Milwaukee County Stadium.
- July 27, 1953: The Korean Armistice Agreement was signed, dividing Korea and effectively ending the Korean War.
- October 6, 1953: The Wisconsin Supreme Court, in the case State ex rel. Thomson v. Zimmerman, resolved the several questions arising from the legislative redistricting process. They ruled the April 1953 constitutional amendment was nullified because the ballot language did not properly describe the proposed amendment. They further found that the state constitution did not allow the legislature to enact more than one redistricting plan per census.
- January 1, 1954: Wisconsin chief justice Oscar M. Fritz resigned due to poor health. Justice Edward T. Fairchild immediately succeeded to the position of chief justice due to the rule of seniority. Wisconsin Governor Walter J. Kohler Jr. appointed Roland J. Steinle to succeed him as justice.
- March 9, 1954: Journalists Edward R. Murrow and Fred W. Friendly released their 30-minute documentary on Wisconsin's controversial U.S. senator Joseph McCarthy.
- April 7, 1954: U.S. President Dwight D. Eisenhower delivered his "Domino theory" speech, warning of the spread of communism in southeast Asia.
- May 17, 1954: The United States Supreme Court, in a unanimous decision in the case of Brown v. Board of Education, ruled that school segregation was unconstitutional.
- July 21, 1954: The 1954 Geneva Conference dismantled French Indochina and divided Vietnam.
- September 8, 1954: The Southeast Asia Collective Defense Treaty was signed, establishing the Southeast Asia Treaty Organization defensive alliance.
- November 2, 1954: Walter J. Kohler Jr. re-elected as Governor of Wisconsin.
- December 2, 1954: The United States Senate voted 67–22 to condemn Wisconsin's U.S. senator Joseph McCarthy for "conduct that tends to bring the Senate into dishonor and disrepute."

== Major legislation ==
- June 6, 1953: An Act ... relating to the apportionment of assemblymen and senators, 1953 Act 242. This was a new redistricting plan to supersede the plan they passed in 1951 utilizing the language of the constitutional amendment passed in April 1953. The Wisconsin Supreme Court struck down this act, along with the related constitutional amendment, in October 1953.
- 1953 Joint Resolution 9: Second legislative passage of a proposed amendment to the state constitution to change the apportionment rules for legislative districts to add consideration for district size. This amendment was approved by voters at the April 1953 election, but was that referendum was later ruled invalid.
- 1953 Joint Resolution 12: Second legislative passage of a proposed amendment to the state constitution to change judicial terms in cases of special elections, so that special elections would now award a full term rather than the remainder of any incomplete term. This amendment was approved by voters at the April 1953 election.

== Party summary ==
=== Senate summary ===
Senate partisan composition Democratic: 7 seats Republican: 26 seats

	Party (Shading indicates majority caucus)		Total	
	Dem.	Rep.	Total	Vacant
End of previous Legislature	7	25	32	1
Start of Reg. Session	7	26	33	0
From Feb. 10, 1953 (Note: Republican Rudolph Schlabach (32nd District) resigned.)	7	25	32	1
From Apr. 23, 1953 (Note: Republican Raymond Bice Sr. (32nd District) sworn in to replace Rudolph Schlabach.)	7	26	33	0
From Oct. 22, 1953 (Note: Republican Gordon A. Bubolz (14th District) resigned.)	7	25	32	1
From Dec. 26, 1953 (Note: Republican Robert P. Robinson (15th District) died.)	7	24	31	2
Final voting share	22.58%	77.42%		
Beginning of the next Legislature	8	25	33	0

=== Assembly summary ===
Assembly partisan composition Democratic: 25 seats Republican: 74 seats Vacant: 1 seat

	Party (Shading indicates majority caucus)		Total	
	Dem.	Rep.	Total	Vacant
End of previous Legislature	23	76	99	1
Start of Reg. Session	25	75	100	0
From Apr. 23, 1953 (Note: Republican Raymond Bice Sr. (La Crosse County) resigned after being elected to the state senate.)	25	74	99	1
From Aug. 14, 1953 (Note: Republican Charles A. Peterson (Fond du Lac County) resigned.)	25	73	98	2
From Dec. 31, 1953 (Note: Republican John E. Reilly Jr. (Milwaukee County) resigned to become a county judge.)	25	72	97	3
Final voting share	25.77%	74.23%		
Beginning of the next Legislature	36	64	100	0

== Sessions ==
- Regular session: January 14, 1953 – November 6, 1953

== Leaders ==
=== Senate leadership ===
- President of the Senate: George M. Smith (R)
- President pro tempore: Frank E. Panzer (R–Oakfield)
- Majority leader: Warren P. Knowles (R–New Richmond)
- Minority leader: Henry Maier (D–Milwaukee)

=== Assembly leadership ===
- Speaker of the Assembly: Ora R. Rice (R–Delavan)
- Majority leader: Mark Catlin Jr. (R–Appleton)
- Minority leader: George Molinaro (D–Kenosha)

== Members ==
=== Members of the Senate ===
Members of the Senate for the Seventy-First Wisconsin Legislature:

Senate partisan representation Democratic: 7 seats Republican: 26 seats

Dist.	Counties	Senator	Residence	Party
01	Door, Kewaunee, & Manitowoc	Everett LaFond	Two Rivers	Rep.
02	Brown & Oconto	Leo P. O'Brien	Green Bay	Rep.
03	Milwaukee (South City)	Casimir Kendziorski	Milwaukee	Dem.
04	Milwaukee (Northeast County & Northeast City)	Harry F. Franke Jr.	Milwaukee	Rep.
05	Milwaukee (Northwest City)	Bernhard Gettelman	Milwaukee	Rep.
06	Milwaukee (North-Central City)	William A. Schmidt	Milwaukee	Dem.
07	Milwaukee (Southeast County & Southeast City)	Roman R. Blenski	Milwaukee	Dem.
08	Milwaukee (Western County)	Allen Busby	West Milwaukee	Rep.
09	Milwaukee (City Downtown)	Henry Maier	Milwaukee	Dem.
10	Buffalo, Pepin, Pierce, & St. Croix	Warren P. Knowles	New Richmond	Rep.
11	Bayfield, Burnett, Douglas, & Washburn	Arthur Lenroot Jr.	Superior	Rep.
12	Ashland, Iron, Price, Rusk, Sawyer, & Vilas	Paul J. Rogan	Ladysmith	Rep.
13	Dodge & Washington	Frank E. Panzer	Oakfield	Rep.
14	Outagamie & Shawano	Gordon A. Bubolz (res. Oct. 22, 1953)	Appleton	Rep.
15	Rock	Robert P. Robinson (died Dec, 26, 1953)	Beloit	Rep.
16	Crawford, Grant, & Vernon	Foster B. Porter	Bloomington	Rep.
17	Green, Iowa, & Lafayette	Melvin Olson	South Wayne	Rep.
18	Fond du Lac, Green Lake & Waushara	Alfred Van De Zande	Campbellsport	Rep.
19	Calumet & Winnebago	William Draheim	Neenah	Dem.
20	Ozaukee & Sheboygan	Louis H. Prange	Sheboygan Falls	Rep.
21	Racine	Gerald T. Flynn	Racine	Dem.
22	Kenosha & Walworth	William Trinke	Lake Geneva	Rep.
23	Portage & Waupaca	Oscar W. Neale	Stevens Point	Rep.
24	Clark, Taylor, & Wood	William W. Clark	Vesper	Rep.
25	Lincoln & Marathon	Clifford Krueger	Merrill	Rep.
26	Dane	Gaylord Nelson	Madison	Dem.
27	Columbia, Richland, & Sauk	Jess Miller	Richland Center	Rep.
28	Chippewa & Eau Claire	Arthur L. Padrutt	Chippewa Falls	Rep.
29	Barron, Dunn, & Polk	William E. Owen	Menomonie	Rep.
30	Florence, Forest, Langlade, Marinette, & Oneida	Philip Downing	Amberg	Rep.
31	Adams, Juneau, Monroe, & Marquette	J. Earl Leverich	Sparta	Rep.
32	Jackson, La Crosse, & Trempealeau	Rudolph Schlabach (res. Feb. 10, 1953)	La Crosse	Rep.
32	Jackson, La Crosse, & Trempealeau	Raymond Bice Sr. (from Apr. 23, 1953)	La Crosse	Rep.
33	Jefferson & Waukesha	Chester Dempsey	Hartland	Rep.

=== Members of the Assembly ===
Members of the Assembly for the Seventy-First Wisconsin Legislature:

Assembly partisan composition Democratic: 25 seats Republican: 74 seats Vacant: 1 seat

Milwaukee County districts

Senate Dist.	County	Dist.	Representative	Party	Residence
31	Adams & Marquette		Louis C. Romell	Rep.	Adams
12	Ashland		Bernard J. Gehrmann	Rep.	Mellen
29	Barron		Charles H. Sykes	Rep.	Cameron
11	Bayfield		Vic C. Wallin	Rep.	Grand View
02	Brown	1	Robert E. Lynch	Dem.	Green Bay
02	Brown	2	Harvey Larsen	Rep.	Denmark
10	Buffalo & Pepin		Mamre H. Ward	Rep.	Durand
11	Burnett & Washburn		Holger Rasmusen	Rep.	Spooner
19	Calumet		Henry M. Peters	Rep.	Menasha
28	Chippewa		Sylvia H. Raihle	Rep.	Chippewa Falls
24	Clark		Walter E. Cook	Rep.	Unity
27	Columbia		Everett Bidwell	Rep.	Portage
16	Crawford		Rodney J. Satter	Rep.	Prairie du Chien
26	Dane	1	Floyd E. Wheeler	Dem.	Madison
26	Dane	2	Carl W. Thompson	Dem.	Stoughton
26	Dane	3	Ervin M. Bruner	Dem.	Verona
13	Dodge	1	Elmer L. Genzmer	Rep.	Mayville
13	Dodge	2	Elmer C. Nitschke	Rep.	Burnett
01	Door		Frank N. Graass	Rep.	Sturgeon Bay
11	Douglas	1	Reino A. Perala	Rep.	Superior
11	Douglas	2	Lawrence M. Hagen	Rep.	Superior
29	Dunn		G. H. Bakke	Rep.	Menomonie
28	Eau Claire		John T. Pritchard	Rep.	Eau Claire
30	Florence, Forest, & Oneida		Clarence W. Gilley	Rep.	Rhinelander
18	Fond du Lac	1	Nicholas J. Lesselyoung	Rep.	Fond du Lac
18	Fond du Lac	2	Charles A. Peterson (died Aug. 14, 1953)	Rep.	Rosendale
16	Grant	1	Robert S. Travis	Rep.	Platteville
16	Grant	2	William A. Loy	Rep.	Fennimore
17	Green		Harry A. Keegan	Rep.	Monroe
18	Green Lake & Waushara		William Belter	Rep.	Wautoma
17	Iowa		John R. Petrus	Rep.	Highland
12	Iron & Vilas		Arne H. Wicklund	Dem.	Gile
32	Jackson		Keith C. Hardie	Dem.	Taylor
33	Jefferson		Byron F. Wackett	Rep.	Watertown
31	Juneau		Ben Tremain	Rep.	Hustler
22	Kenosha	1	Joseph Lourigan	Dem.	Kenosha
22	Kenosha	2	George Molinaro	Dem.	Kenosha
01	Kewaunee		Julius Stangel	Rep.	Kewaunee
32	La Crosse	1	Raymond Bice Sr. (until Apr. 23, 1953)	Rep.	La Crosse
32	La Crosse	1	--Vacant from Apr. 23, 1953--		
32	La Crosse	2	Eugene A. Toepel	Rep.	Medary
17	Lafayette		Martin O. Monson	Rep.	South Wayne
30	Langlade		Walter D. Cavers	Rep.	Antigo
25	Lincoln		Emil A. Hinz	Rep.	Merrill
01	Manitowoc	1	John A. Norman	Rep.	Manitowoc
01	Manitowoc	2	Frank J. LeClair	Rep.	Two Rivers
25	Marathon	1	Martin C. Lueck	Rep.	Hamburg
25	Marathon	2	Paul A. Luedtke	Rep.	Wausau
30	Marinette		Roy H. Sengstock	Rep.	Marinette
09	Milwaukee	1	Robert W. Landry	Dem.	Milwaukee
06	Milwaukee	2	Michael F. O'Connell	Dem.	Milwaukee
08	Milwaukee	3	Robert T. Huber	Dem.	West Allis
09	Milwaukee	4	Frank E. Schaeffer Jr.	Dem.	Milwaukee
03	Milwaukee	5	George Sokolowski	Dem.	Milwaukee
09	Milwaukee	6	Isaac N. Coggs	Dem.	Milwaukee
06	Milwaukee	7	John Schaller	Dem.	Milwaukee
08	Milwaukee	8	Joseph P. Murphy	Dem.	Milwaukee
05	Milwaukee	9	Eugene M. Lamb	Rep.	Milwaukee
07	Milwaukee	10	Leland McParland	Dem.	Cudahy
03	Milwaukee	11	Ervin J. Ryczek	Dem.	Milwaukee
07	Milwaukee	12	Richard B. Nowakowski	Dem.	Milwaukee
04	Milwaukee	13	Ralph Landowski	Dem.	Milwaukee
04	Milwaukee	14	Arthur R. Godar	Rep.	Milwaukee
05	Milwaukee	15	Raleigh W. Falbe	Rep.	Milwaukee
06	Milwaukee	16	Edward F. Mertz	Dem.	Milwaukee
07	Milwaukee	17	Howard F. Pellant	Dem.	Milwaukee
06	Milwaukee	18	Charles J. Schmidt	Dem.	Milwaukee
05	Milwaukee	19	Walter L. Merten	Rep.	Milwaukee
08	Milwaukee	20	John E. Reilly Jr. (res. Dec. 31, 1953)	Rep.	Wauwatosa
31	Monroe		Earl D. Hall	Rep.	Tomah
02	Oconto		Reuben La Fave	Rep.	Oconto
14	Outagamie	1	Mark Catlin Jr.	Rep.	Appleton
14	Outagamie	2	Gerald Lorge	Rep.	Bear Creek
20	Ozaukee		Warren A. Grady	Rep.	Port Washington
10	Pierce		Arthur L. Peterson	Rep.	Prescott
29	Polk		Raymond A. Peabody	Rep.	Milltown
23	Portage		John Kostuck	Dem.	Stevens Point
12	Price		Vincent J. Zellinger	Rep.	Phillips
21	Racine	1	William C. Giese	Dem.	Racine
21	Racine	2	Lawrence R. Larsen	Rep.	Racine
21	Racine	3	Robert J. Matheson	Rep.	Mount Pleasant
27	Richland		Milford C. Kintz	Rep.	Richland Center
15	Rock	1	Clyde Jewett	Rep.	Janesville
15	Rock	2	Burger M. Engebretson	Rep.	Beloit
12	Rusk & Sawyer		Willis J. Hutnik	Rep.	Tony
27	Sauk		James R. Stone	Rep.	Reedsburg
14	Shawano		Robert G. Marotz	Rep.	Shawano
20	Sheboygan	1	Fred E. Nuernberg	Rep.	Sheboygan
20	Sheboygan	2	Henry W. Timmer	Rep.	Waldo
10	St. Croix		William A. Bergeron	Rep.	Somerset
24	Taylor		Fred Rust	Rep.	Medford
32	Trempealeau		Russell Paulson	Rep.	Strum
16	Vernon		Arthur O. Mockrud	Rep.	Westby
22	Walworth		Ora R. Rice	Rep.	Delavan
13	Washington		Kenneth W. Haebig	Rep.	West Bend
33	Waukesha	1	Alvin J. Redford	Rep.	Waukesha
33	Waukesha	2	Alfred R. Ludvigsen	Rep.	Hartland
23	Waupaca		Richard E. Peterson	Rep.	Clintonville
19	Winnebago	1	Harvey R. Abraham	Rep.	Oshkosh
19	Winnebago	2	Arnold J. Cane	Rep.	Menasha
24	Wood		Donald E. Reiland	Rep.	Wisconsin Rapids

== Committees ==
=== Senate committees ===
- Senate Standing Committee on Agriculture and Conservation – M. Olson, chair
- Senate Standing Committee on Committees – J. Miller, chair
- Senate Standing Committee on Contingent Expenditures – F. B. Porter, chair
- Senate Standing Committee on Education and Public Welfare – R. P. Robinson, chair
- Senate Standing Committee on Highways – J. Miller, chair
- Senate Standing Committee on the Judiciary – W. P. Knowles, chair
- Senate Standing Committee on Labor and Management – G. A. Bubolz, chair
- Senate Standing Committee on Legislative Procedure – F. E. Panzer, chair
- Senate Standing Committee on State and Local Government – B. Gettelman, chair
- Senate Standing Committee on Veterans Affairs – J. E. Leverich, chair

=== Assembly committees ===
- Assembly Standing Committee on Agriculture – J. T. Pritchard, chair
- Assembly Standing Committee on Commerce and Manufacturing – E. L. Genzmer, chair
- Assembly Standing Committee on Conservation – R. S. Travis, chair
- Assembly Standing Committee on Contingent Expenditures – E. D. Hall, chair
- Assembly Standing Committee on Education – M. C. Kintz, chair
- Assembly Standing Committee on Elections – H. W. Timmer, chair
- Assembly Standing Committee on Engrossed Bills – L. R. Larsen, chair
- Assembly Standing Committee on Enrolled Bills – R. A. Peabody, chair
- Assembly Standing Committee on Excise and Fees – H. R. Abraham, chair
- Assembly Standing Committee on Highways – H. A. Keegan, chair
- Assembly Standing Committee on Insurance and Banking – B. M. Engebretson, chair
- Assembly Standing Committee on the Judiciary – A. O. Mockrud, chair
- Assembly Standing Committee on Labor – W. E. Cook, chair
- Assembly Standing Committee on Municipalities – P. A. Luedtke, chair
- Assembly Standing Committee on Printing – C. H. Sykes, chair
- Assembly Standing Committee on Public Welfare – H. Rasmusen, chair
- Assembly Standing Committee on Revision – C. A. Peterson, chair
- Assembly Standing Committee on Rules – B. M. Engebretson, chair
- Assembly Standing Committee on State Affairs – B. J. Gehrmann, chair
- Assembly Standing Committee on Taxation – E. C. Nitschke, chair
- Assembly Standing Committee on Third Reading – M. O. Monson, chair
- Assembly Standing Committee on Transportation – J. R. Stone, chair
- Assembly Standing Committee on Veterans and Military Affairs – G. H. Bakke, chair

=== Joint committees ===
- Joint Standing Committee on Finance – A. Lenroot (Sen.) & A. R. Ludvigsen (Asm.), co-chairs
- Joint Standing Committee on Revisions, Repeals, and Uniform Laws – A. Busby (Sen.) & R. G. Marotz (Asm.), co-chairs

== Employees ==
=== Senate employees ===
- Chief Clerk: Thomas M. Donahue
- Sergeant-at-Arms: Harold Damon
  - Assistant Sergeant-at-Arms: Anton J. Oelmiller

=== Assembly employees ===
- Chief Clerk: Arthur L. May
  - Assistant Chief Clerk: Lois H. Vethe
- Sergeant-at-Arms: Norris J. Kellman
