= Frederick Frank =

Frederick or Fredric Frank may refer to:

- Fred Frank (1873–1950), baseball outfielder
- Fred H. Frank (1895–1957), politician
- Fredric M. Frank (1911–1977), film screenwriter
- Frederick Charles Frank (1911–1998), physicist
- Frederick Frank (businessman) (1932–2021), investment banker
- Frederick S. Frank (1935–2008), literary scholar

== See also ==
- Frederick M. Franks Jr. (born 1936), United States Army general
