= Hugo Vogel =

Hugo Vogel may refer to:

- Hugo Vogel (painter) (1855–1934), German painter
- Hugo E. Vogel (1888–1974), American politician
- Hugo Vogel (footballer) (born 2004), French footballer
