= Talsky =

Talsky is a surname. Notable people with the surname include:

- George Talsky (1899–1960), American businessman and politician
- Ron Talsky (1934–1995), American costume designer
