= Henry O. Schowalter =

American politician

Henry O. Schowalter (August 4, 1909 – March 24, 1998) was a member of the Wisconsin State Assembly.

== Biography ==
Schowalter was born on August 4, 1909, in Jackson, Washington County, Wisconsin. He died on March 24, 1998.

== Career ==
Schowalter was a member of the Assembly during the 1937 session. He was an unsuccessful candidate in 1938. Schowalter was a Democrat.
