= Arthur R. Godar =

American politician

Arthur Raymond Godar (January 8, 1924 – February 6, 2011) was an American politician and businessman.

Born in Milwaukee, Wisconsin, Godar served in the United States Army Air Forces during World War II. In 1947, he received his bachelor's degree in business from Marquette University. He owned a car dealership in Oconomowoc, Wisconsin. He served in the Wisconsin State Assembly in 1953 as a Republican. He moved to Florida in 1977 where he owned a motel, the Malaga, in Cape Coral, Florida and served on the Lee County, Florida planning commission.
