= Wallace Leschinsky =

American politician

Wallace Leschinsky (May 12, 1920 – September 20, 1976) was an American politician and businessman.

Born in Beloit, Wisconsin, Leschinsky served in the United States Army during World War II. He went to Rockford Business College in Rockford, Illinois and was a salesman and restaurant owner. In 1955, Leschinsky served in the Wisconsin State Assembly and was a Republican. He died in Beloit, Wisconsin.
