= Wilder W. Crane Jr. =

American politician

Wilder William Crane Jr. (April 7, 1928 – December 7, 1985) was a member of the Wisconsin State Assembly.

== Biography ==
Crane was born on April 7, 1928, in Chippewa Falls, Wisconsin. He initially worked as a lumberjack. His father owned Crane Lumber in Chippewa Falls. After serving in the state Assembly, he worked as a professor at the University of Wisconsin-Milwaukee. He graduated from Carlton College and received his master's degree from Harvard University. Crane said that the county businessmen who gave him an Ivy League education expected him to serve in the Assembly as a "return on their investment."

== Political career ==
Crane was a member of the Wisconsin State Assembly from 1957 to 1958. He was a Republican. Among his actions as a legislator, he introduced a bill to the Assembly in 1957 that would permit publishing the names of juvenile offenders, and he opposed a 1957 resolution honoring Joseph McCarthy.

== Works ==
Crane wrote a book on Wisconsin state politics which he used for his state politics course.
