= Ray Kuhlman =

Wisconsin State Assembly member

Ray Kuhlman (September 10, 1900 – October 7, 1956) was a member of the Wisconsin State Assembly.

== Biography ==
Kuhlman was born on September 10, 1900, in Eau Claire, Wisconsin. He was in the grocery business and served as Sheriff of Eau Claire County, Wisconsin, from 1943 to 1948 and again from 1951 to 1954. Kuhlman died in a traffic collision on October 7, 1956.

== Political career ==
Kuhlman served as sheriff of Eau Claire County from 1943 to 1946, and again from 1950 to 1955. Kuhlman was elected to the Assembly as a Republican in 1954. He remained a member until his death.
