= James G. Lippert =

American politician (1917-2010)

James G. Lippert (January 13, 1917 – August 16, 2010) was an American politician and lawyer.

Born in Milwaukee, Wisconsin, Lippert served in the United States Navy during World War II. He received his bachelor's and law degrees from Marquette University. Lippert practiced law in Milwaukee, Wisconsin and was in the real estate business. Lippert served in the Wisconsin State Assembly and was a Democrat.
