= John R. Gray (politician) =

American politician

John Robert Gray (May 14, 1925 – June 16, 1996) was an American politician who served as a member of the Wisconsin State Assembly.

== Life and career ==
Gray was born in May 1925 in Bryant, Wisconsin. During World War II, he served in the United States Army.

He was elected to the Assembly in 1958. From 1955 to 1959, he was Sheriff of Langlade County, Wisconsin. He was a Democrat.

Gray died from cancer in Livingston, Wisconsin on June 16, 1996, at the age of 71.
