= Einer P. Lund =

American politician (1903–1974)

Einer Peter Lund (November 25, 1903 – May 2, 1974) was a Swedish-born American politician who was elected to the Wisconsin State Assembly in 1958. He was born in Sundsvall, Sweden. He attended Carroll University in Waukesha, Wisconsin. He served one term in the Wisconsin State Legislature and later owned and operated Lund's Clothing Store in Menomonie, Wisconsin.
