= Cecil B. Brown Jr. =

American activist, businessman, and legislator

- Born: July 29, 1926
- Died: June 17, 2006 (aged 79)
- Occupations: American activist, businessman, and legislator

Cecil B. Brown Jr. (July 29, 1926 – June 17, 2006) was an American activist, businessman, and legislator.

Born in Chicago, Illinois, Brown graduated from Marquette University. He was a salesman and tax accountant who was active in the civil rights movement in Milwaukee, Wisconsin. He served in the Wisconsin State Assembly in 1955 as a member of the Democratic Party.
