= John E. Reilly Jr. =

American legislator, lawyer, and jurist

Member of the Wisconsin State Assembly
- In office 1951 – December 31, 1953

Personal details
- Born: John E. Reilly Jr. December 20, 1902 Milwaukee, Wisconsin
- Died: December 5, 1963 (aged 60)

John E. Reilly Jr. (December 20, 1902 – December 5, 1963) was an American legislator, lawyer, and jurist.

Born in Milwaukee, Wisconsin, Reilly went to Marquette Academy (now Marquette University High School). Reilly received his law degree from University of Washington School of Law, in 1928, and then practiced law in Milwaukee, Wisconsin. He lived in Wauwatosa, Wisconsin. Reilly served in the United States Army during World War II and was on the Allied War Crime Commission. Reilly served in the Wisconsin State Assembly from 1951 until December 31, 1953, when Governor Walter Kohler Jr. appointed Reilly Judge of Milwaukee County Civil Court. He served as judge for six months until he lost a primary election for Wisconsin civil court judge. In 1959, Reilly was appointed Milwaukee Court Court Commissioner. Reilly was a Republican. Reilly died of lung cancer at the Wood Veterans Administration Hospital.
