= Fred Rust =

American politician

Fred Rust was a member of the Wisconsin State Assembly.

== Biography ==
Rust was born on December 10, 1908, in Taylor County, Wisconsin. He graduated from high school in Medford, Wisconsin. He died on May 26, 2003.

== Career ==
Rust was elected to the Assembly in 1952. Additionally, he was Chairman of Deer Creek, Taylor County, Wisconsin, Treasurer of Taylor County and a member of the Taylor County Board. He was a Republican.
