= Lloyd R. Baumgart =

American politician

Lloyd Baumgart

Member of the Wisconsin State Assembly
- In office 1957–1964
- Succeeded by: Milton McDougal

Personal details
- Born: Lloyd Raymond Baumgart; January 29, 1908 Green Bay, Wisconsin, U.S.
- Died: July 23, 1985 (aged 77)
- Party: Republican

Lloyd Raymond Baumgart (January 29, 1908 – July 23, 1985) was an American politician who served as a member of the Wisconsin State Assembly.

== Early life and education ==
Baumgart was born on January 29, 1908, in Green Bay, Wisconsin. Baumgart graduated from high school in Powers, Michigan, and went to Green Bay Vocational School.

== Career ==
He owned a dairy farm, a painting and plumbing business, a hardware store, and a dinner club. He later resided in Lena, Wisconsin, and Coleman, Wisconsin. Baumgart was a Republican member of the Wisconsin State Assembly from 1957 to 1964, and was defeated by Democratic challenger Milton McDougal.

== Death ==
Baumgart died on July 23, 1985.
