= David Mogilka =

American lawyer and politician

David R. Mogilka (June 30, 1915 – May 7, 1997) was an American lawyer and politician.

Born in Milwaukee, Wisconsin and a Roman Catholic, he received his law degree from Marquette University Law School in 1941 and was a member of the Knights of Columbus and the Society of the Holy Name. He served in the United States Army Air Forces during World War II as an air defense counsel and special services officer. He then work for the United States Veteran Administration, United States Census Bureau, and the United States Internal Revenue. He served in the Wisconsin State Assembly 1957-1961 as a Democrat. He served as a Milwaukee assistant city attorney 1951–1980. He died in Milwaukee, Wisconsin.
