= Louis L. Merz =

Member of the Wisconsin State Assembly

Louis L. Merz (July 20, 1908 – September 22, 2002) was a member of the Wisconsin State Assembly.

== Biography ==
Merz was born in Milwaukee, Wisconsin. He was Roman Catholic and was a member of the Society of the Holy Name.

== Career ==
Merz was a member of the Assembly from 1957 to 1962. He was a Democrat.
