= Earle W. Fricker =

American politician

Earle W. Fricker was a former member of the Wisconsin State Assembly.

== Biography ==
Fricker was born on February 16, 1926. He attended Washington High School in Milwaukee, Wisconsin before attending Lawrence University, Marquette University and Marquette University Law School. During World War II, he served in the United States Navy. He died on June 30, 1998.

== Political career ==
Fricker was elected to the Assembly in 1954 and re-elected in 1956. He was a Republican.
