= Arthur J. Crowns =

American lawyer and politician

Arthur J. Crowns (January 24, 1922 – October 13, 2008) was a member of the Wisconsin State Assembly.

== Biography ==
Crowns was born on January 24, 1922, in Wisconsin Rapids, Wisconsin. He attended what is now the University of Wisconsin-Stevens Point, Florida State University and the University of Wisconsin-Madison, and University of Wisconsin Law School and began practicing law. During World War II, he served in the United States Army Air Forces. He taught at Florida State University, Memphis State University, and Wichita State University. He died in Wichita, Kansas, on October 13, 2008.

== Political career ==
Crowns was elected to the Assembly in 1956 before being defeated for re-election in 1958. He was a Republican.
