= Sherman R. Sobocinski =

American politician

Sherman R. Sobocinski (1927 - November 16, 2011) was a former member of the Wisconsin State Assembly.

== Biography ==
Sobocinski was born on January 12, 1927, in Cudahy, Wisconsin. During World War II, he served in the United States Navy. He is a member of the Society of the Holy Name. Sobocinski was a hydraulic lift operator, warehouse clerk, and an assistant field manager. He died on November 16, 2011. Sobocinski was a Roman Catholic.

== Political career ==
Sobocinski was elected to the Assembly in 1956 and served until 1963. He was a Democrat.
