= William Merriam (Wisconsin politician) =

American politician

William Merriam was an American politician. He was a member of the Wisconsin State Assembly.

== Biography ==
Merriam was born on September 28, 1894, in Delavan, Wisconsin. He graduated from high school in Wisconsin Rapids, Wisconsin and from Iowa State University. During World War I, he served in the United States Army.

== Political career ==
Merriam was elected to the Assembly in 1956 and re-elected in 1958. He was a Republican.
