= William A. Loy =

American farmer and politician

William A. Loy (May 5, 1895 – June 18, 1982) was an American farmer and politician.

Born in Livingston, Wisconsin, Loy graduated from Livingston High School. He served in the United States Army during World War I and then United States Navy during World War II. Loy went to the college of agriculture at the University of Wisconsin–Madison. He was a farmer and raised horses and cattle. He served on the Livingston High School board and was president of the village of Fennimore, Wisconsin, where he lived. Loy was a deputy undersheriff and chief of police. Loy served as a Republican in the Wisconsin State Assembly in 1953. Loy died on June 18, 1982, at the Good Samaritan Center in Fennimore, Wisconsin.
