= Richard B. Nowakowski =

American politician

Richard B. Nowakowski (January 4, 1921 – October 28, 2007) was a member of the Wisconsin State Assembly.

== Biography ==
Nowakowski was born on January 4, 1921, in Milwaukee, Wisconsin. There, he received a religious-based education and attended South Division High School. During and after World War II, he served in the United States Army. Nowakowski died on October 28, 2007.

== Political career ==
Nowakowski was a member of the Assembly during the 1953 and 1955 sessions. Additionally, he was a member of the Milwaukee Common Council from 1950 to 1952 and from 1956 to 1968. He was a Democrat.
