= Anthony B. Rewald =

American electrical engineer and politician

Anthony Bernard Rewald (March 6, 1906 – August 8, 1993) was an American electrical engineer and politician.

Born in Burlington, Wisconsin, Rewald went to St. Charles Parochial School and Burlington High School. Rewald then went to the Milwaukee School of Engineering and was an electrical contractor. Rewald served on the Racine County, Wisconsin Board of Supervisors. From 1955 to 1959, Rewald served in the Wisconsin State Assembly and was a Republican. Rewald also served on the Burlington Common Council and was mayor of Burlington from 1970 to 1962. Rewald died in Burlington, Wisconsin.
