= William W. Ward =

American politician

William Walter Ward (August 8, 1903 - May 9, 1984) was a member of the Wisconsin State Assembly.

== Biography ==
Ward was born on August 8, 1903, in St. Croix County, Wisconsin. He attended grade school in Star Prairie, Wisconsin and high school in Minneapolis, Minnesota before graduating from the University of Minnesota Law School in 1929. A Roman Catholic, he was a member of the Knights of Columbus.

== Career ==
Ward was elected to the Assembly in 1956, 1958 and 1960. Additionally, he was City Attorney and a member of the school board of New Richmond, Wisconsin. He was a Democrat.
