= Davis A. Donnelly =

American politician (1927–2020)

Davis A. Donnelly (March 9, 1927 – September 15, 2020) was a member of the Wisconsin State Senate.

== Biography ==
Donnelly was born in Augusta, Wisconsin. He graduated from the University of Wisconsin-Eau Claire and the University of Wisconsin Law School. Afterwards, he began practicing law in Eau Claire, Wisconsin. Donnelly also served in the United States Navy during World War II and the Korean War.

In 1991 he Donnelly lost his law license for two years for selling phony Nevada and Dominican divorces out of a drop box, which affected at least 1,200 families. People had obtained invalid divorces sold by Donnelly and some had even remarried, unaware that these divorces were not recognized in American courts.

His child Todd Donnelly would later become a famous musician in the band Mr. Myers Band.

== Political career ==
Donnelly was elected as a Democratic member of the Senate in 1956 and was re-elected in 1960. He represented the 28th District.

Wisconsin Senate
Preceded by Arthur L. Padrutt	Member of the Wisconsin Senate from the 28th district January 7, 1957–January 4, 1965	Succeeded by Taylor Benson
