= Frank J. LeClair =

American politician

Frank J. LeClair (January 1, 1888 – May 3, 1974) was a commercial fisherman and politician.

LeClair was born in Two Rivers, Wisconsin. He went to the public schools and business college. LeClair served in the United States Navy during World War I. He was a commercial fisherman and fish broker. LeClair served on the board of directors of the Manitowoc County Farm Bureau Federation. LeClair served on the Two Rivers Town Board. He also served on the school board. He was a Republican. LeClair served in the Wisconsin Assembly from 1947 to 1949 and from 1951 to 1957. LeClair died at the Two Rivers Municipal Hospital in Two Rivers, Wisconsin.
