= Marty Larsen =

American politician

Marty Larsen (May 9, 1905 – June 11, 1988) was a member of the Wisconsin State Assembly.

== Biography ==
Larsen was born on May 9, 1905, in Oconto, Wisconsin. He graduated from Milwaukee State College. During the World War II era, he served in the United States Coast Guard from 1940 to 1942. He was a school teacher and a building manager. Larsen died on June 11, 1988, in Milwaukee, Wisconsin, of cancer.

== Political career ==
Larsen was elected to the Wisconsin State Assembly in 1956 and 1958. Additionally, he was Supervisor of Milwaukee County, Wisconsin, from 1940 to 1956. He was a Democrat.
