= Paul J. Rogan =

American politician

Paul J. Rogan (August 21, 1918 – January 29, 1980) was a member of the Wisconsin State Assembly and the Wisconsin State Senate.

== Biography ==
Rogan was born on August 21, 1918, in Eagle, Wisconsin. He attended high school in De Pere, Wisconsin, before attending St. Norbert College and what is now the University of Wisconsin–Madison. During World War II, he served in the United States Army. He lived in Ladysmith, Wisconsin and died in 1980.

== Political career ==
Rogan was elected to the Assembly in 1948 and 1950 and to the Senate in 1952 and 1954. In addition, he was a member of the Committee on Permanent Organization of the 1960 Republican National Convention.

== See also ==
- The Political Graveyard
