= Joseph H. Anderson (Wisconsin politician) =

American politician

Joseph H. Anderson (November 1, 1893 – January 1, 1969) was a member of the Wisconsin State Assembly.

== Biography ==
Anderson was born in Menasha, Wisconsin. He attended business school in Oshkosh, Wisconsin. He died on January 1, 1969, at age 75.

== Career ==
Anderson was a member of the Assembly from 1955 to 1958 as a Republican. In 1958, he was defeated as an Independent. Previously, Anderson had been President of the Community School Board and Treasurer of Winneconne, Wisconsin.

== See also ==
- The Political Graveyard
