= G. H. Bakke =

American politician

Gerhart H. Bakke (August 21, 1918 – June 17, 2006) was a member of the Wisconsin State Assembly.

== Biography ==
Gerhart Helmer Bakke was born in Menomonie, Wisconsin. He was the son of Amund Bakke (1884-1951) and Marie Christine (Walseth) Bakke (1885-1959). He attended the University of Wisconsin-Madison earning a Bachelor of Science degree in Agricultural Education. During World War II, he served with the United States Navy in the Pacific Theater of Operations. He was an instructor in agriculture at the Dunn County School of Agriculture and Domestic Economy (founded 1901, closed 1957).

== Political career ==
Bakke was elected to the Assembly in a special election in 1951 to fill the vacancy caused by the death of Earl W. Hanson. Later, he became Secretary of the Wisconsin Department of Transportation. He was a Republican.
