= Harold F. Huibregtse =

American politician

Harold F. Huibgretse (August 20, 1907 – February 21, 2005) was a member of the Wisconsin State Assembly and the Wisconsin State Senate.

== Biography ==
Huibgretse was born on August 20, 1907, in Lima, Sheboygan County, Wisconsin. He attended schools in Hingham, Wisconsin, and Cedar Grove, Wisconsin. Huibregtse was an automobile dealer, salesman, and securities dealer. He died on February 21, 2005, in Sheboygan Falls, Wisconsin.

== Career ==
Huibgretse was a member of the Assembly in 1955 and 1957. In 1958, he was elected to the Senate in a special election following the death of Louis H. Prange. Previously, he was a member of the Sheboygan Falls, Wisconsin Board of Education. He was a Republican.
