= Clyde Jewett =

American politician

Clyde A. Jewett (January 18, 1907, Richland County, Wisconsin – November 3, 1983, Glendale, California) was a member of the Wisconsin State Assembly. He graduated from high school in Richland Center, Wisconsin. Later, he worked in the Fisher Body division at the Janesville Assembly Plant in Janesville, Wisconsin.

== Political career ==
Jewett was elected to the Assembly in 1952. He was a Republican.
