= Carroll Metzner =

American politician (1919–2008)

Carroll Edwin Metzner (April 24, 1919 – December 6, 2008) was a Wisconsin legislator.

Born in Milwaukee, Wisconsin, Metzner graduated from Northwestern University and received his law degree from the University of Wisconsin–Madison. In 1951, he was elected to the Madison Common Council. Metzner also served in the Wisconsin State Assembly from 1953 to 1957 as a Republican.
