= Alfred J. Lauby =

American politician

Alfred J. Lauby was an American politician. He was an Independent member of the Wisconsin State Assembly.

== Biography ==
Lauby was born on October 7, 1908, in Antigo, Wisconsin. (address: 209 10th Ave., Antigo.) He graduated from St. John's Parochial School and Antigo High School. He became a dairy products sales-man, painter and decorator, and a tavern operator. During World War II, he served with the United States Navy. Lauby died in 1985.

== Political career ==
Lauby was a member of the Assembly from 1955 to 1958 as a member of the Democratic Party. In 1958, he was defeated for re-election as an Independent.
