= Hugh M. Jones =

American politician

Hugh M. Jones (October 9, 1892 – July 1, 1978) was a member of the Wisconsin State Senate from 1955 to 1958. Previously, he was a candidate for the United States House of Representatives from Wisconsin's 9th congressional district. He lost to incumbent Merlin Hull. Jones was a Republican.

Born in Dousman, Wisconsin, Jones graduated from the University of Wisconsin Agricultural School in 1915 and also was an instructor at the university. He then served in the United States Army during World War I, in 1917. He also served during World War II. He was an automobile dealer in Bloomer, Wisconsin and served on the Bloomer Common Council. He was assistant commissioner and then commissioner of the Wisconsin Motor Vehicle Department. Jones died in Wausau, Wisconsin.
