= Fred H. Frank =

American politician

Fred H. Frank (July 1, 1895 in Lessor, Wisconsin – July 10, 1957) was a member of the Wisconsin State Assembly who lived in Appleton. During World War I, he served with the First Army of the American Expeditionary Forces. From 1940 to 1945, Frank was Sheriff of Outagamie County, Wisconsin.

== Political career ==
Frank first served in the Assembly from 1945 to 1949. He was re-elected to the Assembly in 1956 and remained a member until his death. Previously, Frank had been a member of the Outagamie County Board from 1930 to 1936. He was a Republican.
