= Henry M. Peters =

American politician

Henry Martin Peters (November 21, 1889 – May 4, 1987) was a member of the Wisconsin State Assembly.

== Biography ==
Peters was born Henry Martin Peters on November 21, 1889, in Woodville, Calumet County, Wisconsin. He became a dairy farmer.

== Political career ==
Peters served in the Assembly from 1949 to 1958 as a Republican. He was defeated for re-election in 1958, running as an Independent.
