= Walter L. Merten =

American politician

Walter L. Merten (December 11, 1922 – November 8, 2001) was an American politician.

Born in Milwaukee, Wisconsin, Merten went to Marquette University High School. He then received his bachelor's degree from Marquette University and his law degree from Marquette Law School. Merten served in the United States Army in the Philippines and Japan during World War II. Merten then served as a civilian military officer in Japan as a specialist in education and government. Merten served in the Wisconsin State Assembly in 1949 and 1951 as a Republican and then served in the Wisconsin State Senate in 1955. He died in Milwaukee, Wisconsin.
