= James D. H. Peterson =

American politician (1894–1961)

Member of the Wisconsin State Assembly from the La Crosse 1st district
- In office January 3, 1955 – January 2, 1961
- Preceded by: Raymond Bice Sr.
- Succeeded by: D. Russell Wartinbee
- In office January 5, 1925 – January 3, 1927
- Preceded by: Henry Nein
- Succeeded by: Gardner R. Withrow

Personal details
- Born: August 7, 1894 La Crosse, Wisconsin
- Died: January 18, 1961 (aged 66) La Crosse, Wisconsin
- Party: Republican

James D. H. Peterson (August 7, 1894 - January 18, 1961) was a member of the Wisconsin State Assembly.

== Biography ==
Peterson was born on August 7, 1894, in La Crosse, Wisconsin. He attended the University of Wisconsin–La Crosse, University of Wisconsin–Madison and Washington and Lee University. During World War I, he served with the United States Army. He died on January 18, 1961, in La Crosse, Wisconsin.

== Political career ==
Peterson was twice a member of the Assembly. First, from 1925 to 1926, and second, from 1955 to 1960. He was a Republican.
