= Vic C. Wallin =

American politician and businessman

Vic Wallin

Member of the Wisconsin Assembly
- In office 1951–1958

Personal details
- Born: Victor Wallin; May 27, 1899 Washburn, Wisconsin
- Died: June 8, 1981 (aged 82) Bayfield, Wisconsin, U.S.
- Party: Republican
- Children: 3
- Education: La Salle Extension University

Victor C. Wallin (May 27, 1899 – June 8, 1981) was an American politician and businessman who served as member of the Wisconsin State Assembly.

== Early life and education ==
Wallin was born in Washburn, Wisconsin. He graduated from La Salle Extension University with a degree in accounting.

== Career ==
After graduating from college, Wallin in petroleum, general merchandise, and insurance.

Wallin served as town chairman and member of the Bayfield County, Wisconsin Board of Supervisors. He lived in Grand View, Wisconsin. Wallin served in the Wisconsin State Assembly from 1951 until 1958, when he was defeated for re-election. He was a Republican.

== Personal life ==
Wallin and his wife, Edith, married in 1922 and had three children. He died on June 8, 1981, in Bayfield, Wisconsin.
