= Elmer J. Schowalter =

American politician

Elmer J. Schowalter (October 12, 1894 – June 9, 1964) was a member of the Wisconsin State Assembly.

== Biography ==
Schowalter was born on October 12, 1894, in Jackson, Washington County, Wisconsin. He attended the University of Wisconsin-Madison and became active in his local church. He died after a stroke at St. Joseph's Hospital in West Bend, Wisconsin on June 9, 1964.

== Career ==
Schowalter was a member of the Assembly from 1955 to 1964. He was a Republican.

== See also ==
- The Political Graveyard
