= William T. Sullivan =

American politician

William T. Sullivan (April 6, 1894 – March 21, 1968) was a member of the Wisconsin State Assembly.

== Biography ==
Sullivan was born on April 6, 1894, in Oconto, Wisconsin. He graduated from Oconto High School before attending the University of Wisconsin-Madison, the University of Wisconsin-Oshkosh and Lawrence University. He taught in various schools until he was appointed director of the Kaukauna Vocational School in 1927, a position he held until he entered politics in 1954. During World War I and World War II, Sullivan served in the United States Navy, reaching the rank of lieutenant commander. Sullivan was a member of the American Legion, the Forty and Eight, the Benevolent and Protective Order of Elks and the Knights of Columbus. He died at a hospital in Madison on March 21, 1968.

== Political career ==
Sullivan was elected to the Assembly in 1954, 1956 and 1958. He was a Republican.

== See also ==
- The Political Graveyard
