= Alvin J. Redford =

American politician and police officer

Alvin J. Redford (August 25, 1883 – 1974) was an American law enforcement officer and politician.

Born in Pewaukee, Wisconsin, Redford served as a city police officer. He also served as Sheriff of Waukesha County, Wisconsin and deputy sheriff. Redford served in the Wisconsin State Assembly during the 1949, 1951, 1953, 1955 and 1957 sessions and was a Republican.
