= Jackson, Washington County, Wisconsin =

Town in Washington County, Wisconsin

Jackson, Wisconsin
- Town
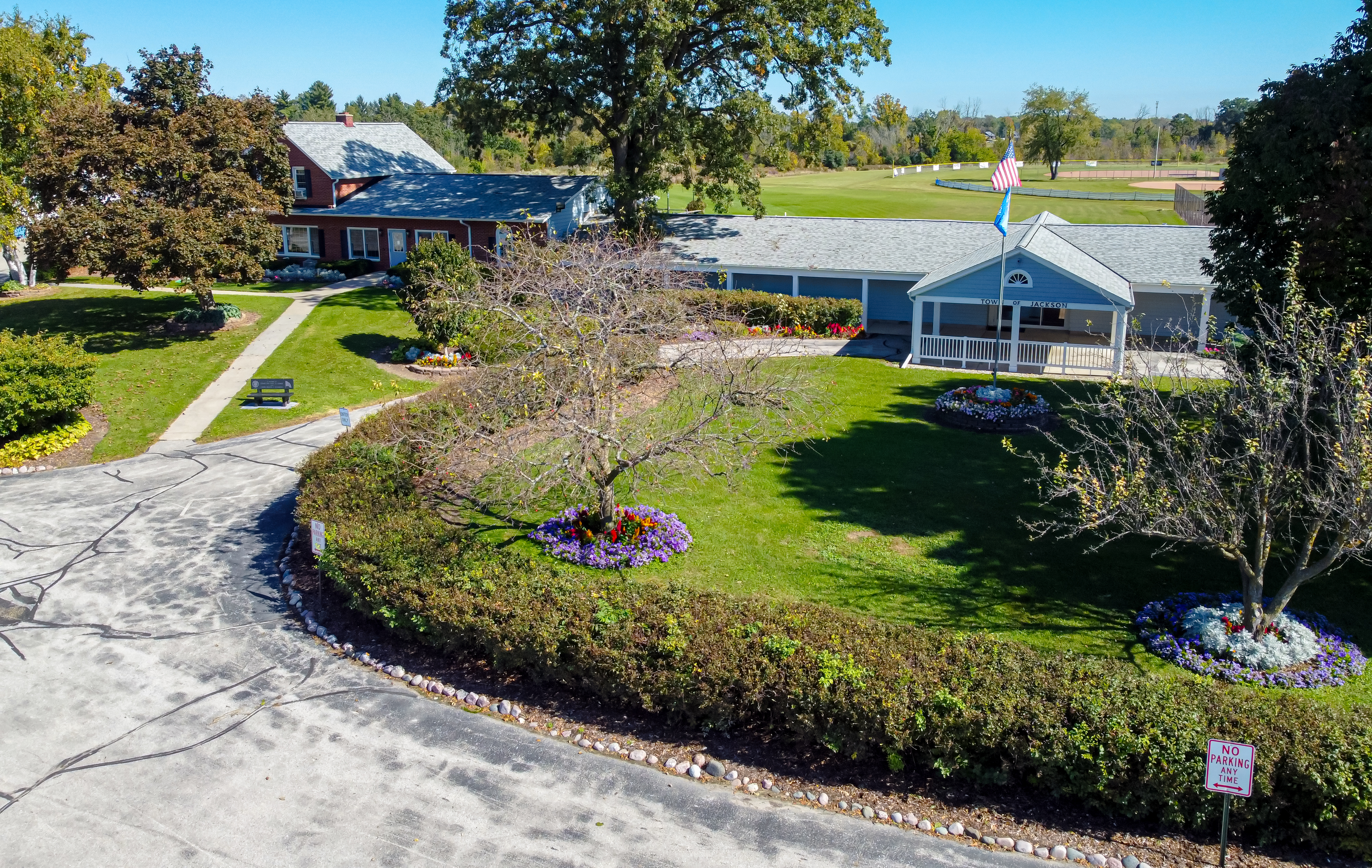
- Town hall

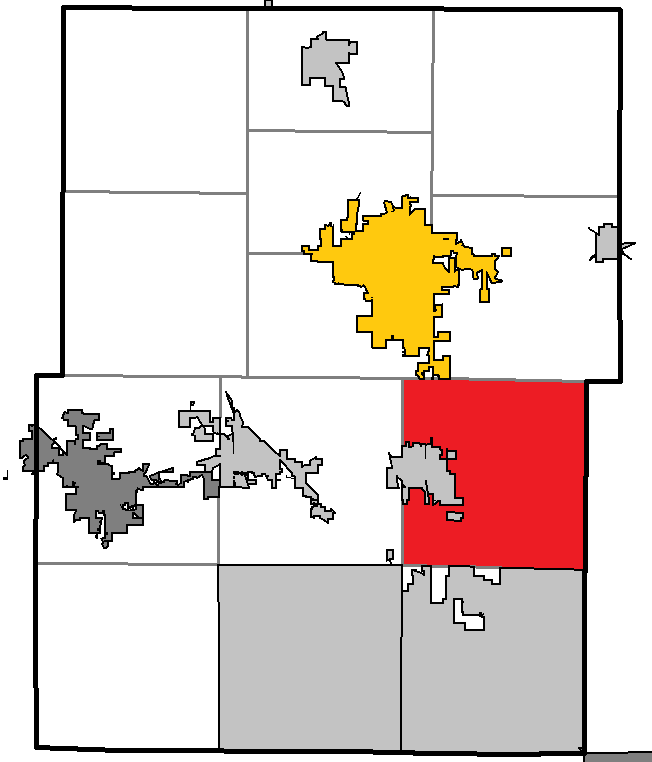
- Location of Jackson, within Washington County, Wisconsin
- Coordinates: 43°19′31″N 88°7′46″W
- Country: United States
- State: Wisconsin
- County: Washington

Area
  - Total: 38.2 sq mi (99.0 km^{2})
  - Land: 34.2 sq mi (88.7 km^{2})
  - Water: 0.12 sq mi (0.3 km^{2})
- Elevation: 843 ft (257 m)

Population (2020)
  - Total: 4,629
  - Density: 135/sq mi (52.2/km^{2})
- Time zone: UTC-6 (Central (CST))
  - Summer (DST): UTC-5 (CDT)
- Postal code: 53037
- Area code: 262
- FIPS code: 55-37675
- GNIS feature ID: 1583444
- Website: www.townofjacksonwi.gov

Jackson is a town in Washington County, Wisconsin, United States. The population was 4,629 at the 2020 census. The Village of Jackson is located partially within the town. The unincorporated community of Kirchhayn is also located in the town.

== Geography ==
The 2,312-acre Jackson Marsh Wildlife Area, which is maintained by the Wisconsin Department of Natural Resources, is located in the town and contains undeveloped forested wetlands. Cedar Creek, a tributary of the Milwaukee River runs also through the town.

According to the United States Census Bureau, the town has a total area of 34.4 square miles (89.0 km^{2}), of which 34.2 square miles (88.7 km^{2}) is land and 0.1 square mile (0.3 km^{2}) (0.32%) is water.

== History ==
The first white settlers arrived in the Jackson area in 1843. The Wisconsin territorial legislature created the Town of Jackson on January 21, 1846, naming the settlement for former-president Andrew Jackson, who had died several months earlier.

Early settlements in the town included the hamlet of Kirchhayn, which formed around David's Star Lutheran Church in the 1840s, as well as the hamlet of Riceville, which later become the Village of Jackson. In the 1800s, the town's economy relied heavily on agricultural, and including dairy farming. Some of the earliest businesses in the community were cheese factories and creameries.

In 1872, the Chicago and North Western Railway built a line from Milwaukee to Fond du Lac with a station in Riceville. Entrepreneurs took advantage of the transportation link, and built businesses and industries on the formerly agricultural land around the railway station. Riceville incorporated from the town's land as the Village of Jackson on March 14, 1912.

The village experienced a population boom in the early 1970s and has continued to grow into the early 2000s. Between 1970 and 1975, the population more than tripled from 561 to 1,895. To accommodate the new population, the village annexed more land from the town for new residential subdivisions and commercial developments. The annexations created tax losses for the town. In 1999, the town and the village created an agreement setting the village's maximum potential boundaries and outlining how the town would be compensated for future annexations. Jackson was the first community in Wisconsin to create such an agreement.

On July 17, 2012, a petroleum product pipeline spilled an estimated 54,600 gallons of gasoline in the Town of Jackson. Thirty-seven private wells contaminated by the spill were ordered abandoned by the Wisconsin Department of Natural Resources. The West Shore Pipe Line Company, which owned the pipeline, paid the costs to extend water services from the Village of Jackson to a large part of the Town of Jackson.

== Demographics ==
Historical population
Census	Pop.	Note	%±
1920	230		—
1930	227		−1.3%
1940	302		33.0%
1950	361		19.5%
1960	458		26.9%
1970	561		22.5%
1980	1,817		223.9%
1990	2,486		36.8%
2000	4,938		98.6%
2010	6,753		36.8%
2020	7,185		6.4%
2022 (est.)	7,975		11.0%
U.S. Decennial Census

As of the census of 2000, there were 3,516 people, 1,201 households, and 1,012 families residing in the town. The population density was 102.7 people per square mile (39.6/km^{2}). There were 1,230 housing units at an average density of 35.9 per square mile (13.9/km^{2}). The racial makeup of the town was 98.95% White, 0.03% Black or African American, 0.06% Native American, 0.34% Asian, and 0.63% from two or more races. 0.34% of the population were Hispanic or Latino of any race.

There were 1,201 households, out of which 40.3% had children under the age of 18 living with them, 78.2% were married couples living together, 3.2% had a female householder with no husband present, and 15.7% were non-families. 13.0% of all households were made up of individuals, and 5.0% had someone living alone who was 65 years of age or older. The average household size was 2.93 and the average family size was 3.22.

In the town, the population was spread out, with 28.1% under the age of 18, 6.1% from 18 to 24, 28.8% from 25 to 44, 28.1% from 45 to 64, and 8.9% who were 65 years of age or older. The median age was 38 years. For every 100 females, there were 103.4 males. For every 100 females age 18 and over, there were 101.8 males.

The median income for a household in the town was $64,070, and the median income for a family was $66,410. Males had a median income of $45,536 versus $26,972 for females. The per capita income for the town was $22,045. None of the families and 0.5% of the population were living below the poverty line, including no under eighteens and 1.8% of those over 64.

== Government ==
The Town of Jackson is administered by an elected board consisting of four supervisors and a chair.

== Education ==
Jackson Elementary School is the public elementary school in Jackson. Kettle Moraine Lutheran High School is a high school of the Wisconsin Evangelical Lutheran Synod in Jackson. Living Word Lutheran, another church in Jackson, has a child development center as well as a high school, Living Word Lutheran High School.

== Notable people ==
- James Fagan, farmer and politician
- John G. Frank, politician
- William Froehlich, politician
- Stoddard King, journalist, author, and humorist
- Elmer J. Schowalter, politician
- Henry O. Schowalter, politician
