= Walter B. Calvert =

American politician

Walter B. Calvert (December 23, 1904, in Benton, Wisconsin – 1987) was a member of the Wisconsin State Assembly. Calvert attended the University of Wisconsin-Madison and University of Wisconsin-Whitewater.

Calvert was a member of the assembly from 1955 to 1964. He was a Republican.
