= Mamre H. Ward =

American politician

Mamre H. Ward was a member of the Wisconsin State Assembly.

== Biography ==
Ward was born on January 16, 1899, in Durand, Wisconsin. He graduated from Durand High School. Ward was a farmer and lived in the town of Canton Buffalo County, Wisconsin. He was involved with the canning and banking business. Ward served as chairman of the Canton Town Board. Ward served in the Wisconsin Assembly from 1951 to 1959 and was a Republican. In 1964, Ward moved to Durand, Wisconsin. He died on October 13, 1969, in a hospital in Durand, Wisconsin.
