= Michael F. O'Connell =

American politician

Michael F. O'Connell (1877, Tipperary, Ireland - was a politician and first elected at the age of 61 to the Wisconsin State Assembly. He was repeatedly re-elected until 1958, when he was defeated in the Democratic primary race. He had immigrated from Ireland and settled in Milwaukee, Wisconsin.

== Biography ==
O'Connell was born on January 27, 1877, in Tipperary, Ireland. He later immigrated to the United States, settling in Milwaukee, Wisconsin, and working as a railroad conductor.

== Career ==
O'Connell had joined the Democratic Party and became increasingly active after World War II. He was elected to the state Assembly in 1948. He was repeatedly re-elected. But in 1958, O'Connell was defeated in the Democratic primary for his seat by Patrick H. Kelly. He ran unsuccessfully as an Independent in the general election.
