= Robert T. Huber =

American politician (1920–1991)

65th & 67th Speaker of the Wisconsin Assembly
- In office January 4, 1971 – December 13, 1971
- Preceded by: Harold Vernon Froehlich
- Succeeded by: Norman C. Anderson
- In office January 13, 1965 – January 11, 1967
- Preceded by: Robert D. Haase
- Succeeded by: Harold Vernon Froehlich

Wisconsin Assembly Minority Leader
- In office January 11, 1967 – January 4, 1971
- Preceded by: Paul Alfonsi
- Succeeded by: Harold Vernon Froehlich
- In office January 11, 1961 – January 13, 1965
- Preceded by: David Blanchard
- Succeeded by: Robert D. Haase
- In office January 12, 1955 – January 14, 1959
- Preceded by: George Molinaro
- Succeeded by: David Blanchard

Member of the Wisconsin State Assembly
- In office January 1, 1955 – December 13, 1971
- Preceded by: Position established
- Succeeded by: Gary J. Barczak
- Constituency: Milwaukee 22nd district
- In office January 1, 1949 – January 1, 1955
- Preceded by: Louis Hicks
- Succeeded by: Joseph A. Greco
- Constituency: Milwaukee 3rd district

Personal details
- Born: August 29, 1920 Eckelson, North Dakota, US
- Died: October 20, 1991 (aged 71)
- Party: Democratic
- Spouse: Beatrice Johanna Bartlein
- Parents: Theodore J. Huber (father); Rose (Ziebert) Huber (mother)

Robert T. Huber (August 29, 1920 – October 20, 1991) was an American politician. He was the 65th and 67th Speaker of the Wisconsin State Assembly. He served a total of 23 years in the Assembly—from 1949 to 1972—and was Democratic leader in the Assembly for 17 years.

== Biography ==
Huber was born on August 29, 1920, in Eckelson, North Dakota. In his youth, he moved to Wisconsin and graduated from West Allis Central High School in West Allis, Wisconsin. He worked as a contractor and sold auto parts and merchandise.

Huber was first elected to the Assembly in 1948. He was chosen as Minority Leader in the 1955-1956 session, and subsequently served as the Democrats' leader in the minority until 1965, when the Democrats gained the majority. Huber was Speaker for the 1965-1966 session, before returning to the minority for another four years. He served as Speaker when the Democrats again retook the majority in 1971, but resigned in 1972 to accept an appointment to become Chair of the State Highway Commission.

== Personal life and family ==
Huber married Beatrice Bartlein in 1944. They had two children. Huber was a member of the Catholic Church, the Knights of Columbus, the Society of the Holy Name and the Brewery Workers' Union. He died on October 20, 1991.

Wisconsin State Assembly
Preceded by Louis Hicks	Member of the Wisconsin State Assembly from the Milwaukee 3rd district January 1, 1949 – January 1, 1955	Succeeded by Joseph A. Greco
District created	Member of the Wisconsin State Assembly from the Milwaukee 22nd district January 1, 1955 – January 18, 1972	District abolished
Preceded by George Molinaro	Minority Leader of the Wisconsin State Assembly; January 12, 1955 – January 1, 1959	Succeeded by David Blanchard
Preceded by David Blanchard	Minority Leader of the Wisconsin State Assembly; January 11, 1961 – January 1, 1965	Succeeded by Robert D. Haase
Preceded by Robert D. Haase	Speaker of the Wisconsin State Assembly; 1965 – 1967	Succeeded by Harold Vernon Froehlich
Preceded by Paul Alfonsi	Minority Leader of the Wisconsin State Assembly; January 11, 1967 – January 4, 1971	Succeeded by Harold Vernon Froehlich
Preceded by Harold Vernon Froehlich	Speaker of the Wisconsin State Assembly; 1971 – 1972	Succeeded by Norman C. Anderson
