= Robert G. Marotz =

American politician (1921–2012)

Speaker of the Wisconsin State Assembly
- In office 1957–1959
- Preceded by: Mark Catlin, Jr.
- Succeeded by: George Molinaro
- Constituency: Shawano County

Wisconsin State Assembly
- In office 1947–1957
- Preceded by: Charles Ebert

Personal details
- Born: Robert Gustav Marotz; November 14, 1921 Sheboygan, Wisconsin
- Died: June 23, 2012 (aged 90) Brookfield, Wisconsin
- Resting place: Wisconsin Memorial Park
- Party: Republican
- Spouse: Alice Yoder Marotz (4 children)
- Profession: Lawyer

Military service
- Branch/service: United States Marines
- Years of service: 1941–43
- Battles/wars: World War II; • Pacific War

Robert G. Marotz (November 14, 1921 – June 23, 2012) was a Republican American politician.

== Background ==
Born in Sheboygan, Wisconsin, Marotz graduated from Shawano High School. During World War II, Marotz served in the United States Marine Corps in the Pacific Theater from August 1941 to November 1943. He was sent to Officer Candidate School at Bowling Green State University and Dartmouth College. He was a member of the Wisconsin State Assembly from 1949 through 1959. He served five terms from Shawano County, Wisconsin in the Legislature, as Majority Leader from 1955 to 1957, and was elected Speaker of the Assembly from 1957 to 1959.

After the conclusion of World War II he returned to the study of law in the office of a lawyer and passed the bar exam. He was the last Wisconsin attorney admitted to practice of law by the state Supreme Court without benefit of formal law school training. He then enrolled at the University of Wisconsin Law School, completed the full 3 year coursework and obtained the law degree (LL. B).

== Wisconsin State Assembly ==
- As member 1949-55 participated in revision of Criminal and Corporation Codes
- Chairman Legis. Council Judiciary Com. 1951-53
- Asst. Floor Leader 1953
- Rep. Floor Leader 1955
- Secretary 1955-57
- Elected Speaker of the Assembly 1957-59
- Chairman Legis. Council 1957-59
- Vice- chm. Interstate Cooperation Comn. 1957–59, member 1953-59
- Chosen Chief Clerk of the Assembly 1961-62

== Political Involvement ==
- Wisconsin Presidential Elector, 1956
- Lobbyist for Consolidated Freightways 1959-63
- Lobbyist for Wisconsin State Brewers Association 1963-93
- President of Wisconsin Society of Association Executives, 1973
