= William Luebke =

American politician (1906–1960)

Member of the Wisconsin State Assembly
- In office 1955–1959; 1941–1943

Personal details
- Born: April 28, 1906 Milwaukee, Wisconsin
- Died: May 15, 1960 (aged 54) West Allis, Wisconsin
- Party: Democratic
- Other political affiliations: Progressive

William Luebke (April 28, 1906 – May 15, 1960) was an American construction worker, woolen mill superintendent, and politician.

== Early life and education ==
Born in Milwaukee, Wisconsin, Luebke studied in high school and vocational school. He took a summer course at University of Wisconsin.

== Career ==
Luebke worked as a construction worker and a woolen mill superintendent. From 1941 to 1943, Luebke served in the Wisconsin State Assembly as a Progressive. He served again from 1955 to 1959 as a Democrat.

== Death ==
Luebke died in his house in West Allis, Wisconsin of a heart attack while still in office.
