= Charles H. Sykes =

American politician

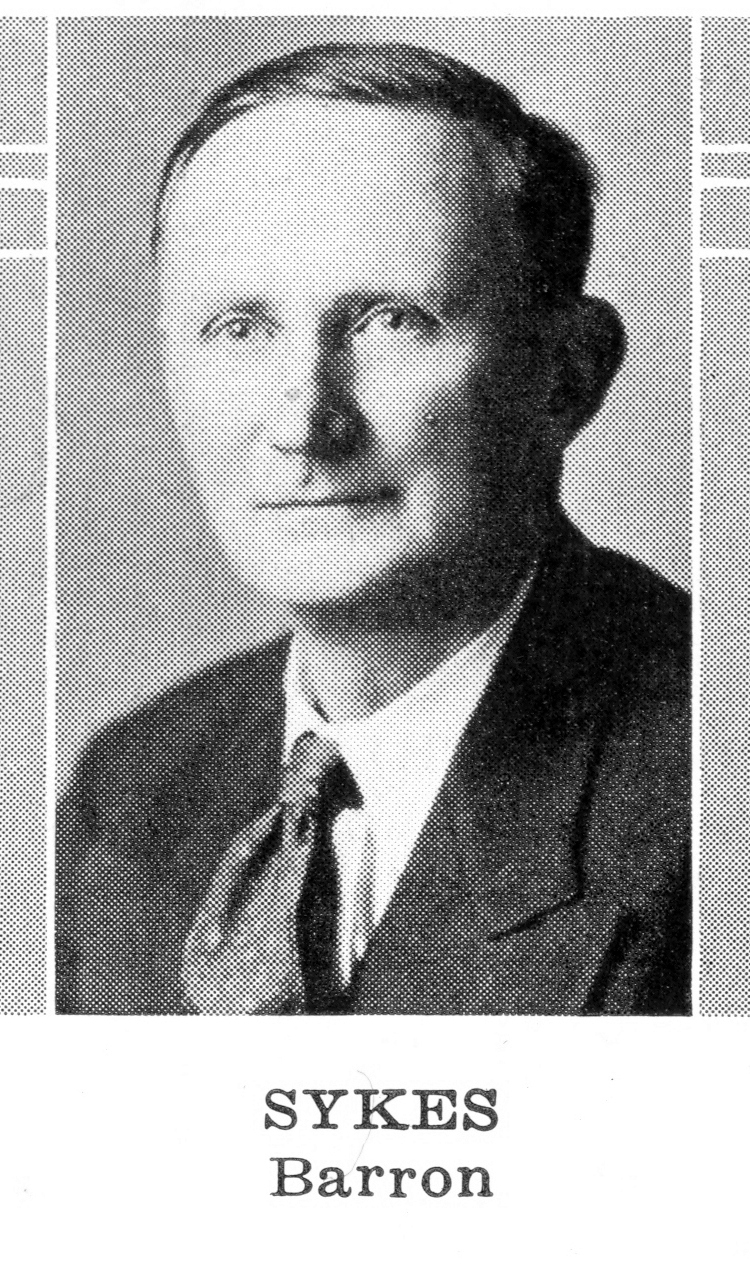
Charles H. Sykes

Charles H. Sykes (January 11, 1881 – December 5, 1966) was a member of the Wisconsin State Assembly.

== Life ==
Sykes was born on January 11, 1881, in Brodhead, Wisconsin. After graduating from Milton Junction High School, he attended Janesville Business College. Sykes died in a hospital in Youngtown, Arizona.

== Political career ==
Sykes was a member of the Assembly from 1939 to 1958. He was first elected as a member of the Progressive Party but became a Republican in 1943.
