= Vincent J. Zellinger =

American politician

Vincent J. Zellinger was a member of the Wisconsin State Assembly.

== Biography ==
Zellinger was born on February 10, 1901, in what later became the Republic of Czechoslovakia. He took military training at Camp Custer, Michigan in 1926. He later moved to Phillips, Wisconsin. He died on May 5, 1966.

== Career ==
Zellinger was first elected to the Assembly in 1946. Additionally, he was Clerk of Phillips and was town clerk. Zellinger also served on the school board. He was a Republican.
