= Fred W. Schlueter =

American politician

Frederich William Schlueter (April 16, 1895 – November 20, 1969) was a member of the Wisconsin State Assembly.

He was born in Berlin, Wisconsin. He attended the University of Wisconsin-Madison. He died of a heart attack, while at a hunting camp near Grand Marsh, Wisconsin.

== Career ==
Schlueter was a member of the Assembly from 1955 to 1964. Previously, he had been clerk of the Town of Ripon, Wisconsin. He was a Republican.
