= Lawrence M. Hagen =

American politician

Lawrence Magnus Hagen (April 4, 1904 – June 8, 1992) was a politician in the State of Wisconsin.

== Biography ==
Hagen was born in Black River Falls, Wisconsin. In 1926, he married Inez McLaughlin (1906–1973). In 1974, Hagen married Hazel Florence Sanderson (1902–1996). Hagen died in Superior, Wisconsin.

== Career ==
Hagen was employed as a machinist and railroad worker. Hagen served as a member of the Wisconsin State Assembly from Douglas County 2nd District (1953 to 1958). Hagen also served on the Superior Common Council. Aside from politics, he worked as a machinist and a railroad worker.
