= Ervin M. Bruner =

American politician

Ervin Murray Bruner (November 12, 1915 – November 24, 2008) was a member of the Wisconsin State Assembly from Verona and Madison, Wisconsin.

== Biography ==
Bruner was born on November 12, 1915, in Lenoir, North Carolina. He graduated from the University of Wisconsin–Milwaukee, the University of Wisconsin–Madison, and the University of Wisconsin Law School. He practiced law and was a farmer. During World War II, he served in the United States Army. Bruner died on November 24, 2008.

== Political career ==
Bruner was a member of the Assembly from 1955 until his resignation on July 1, 1957, to become a judge of the Dane County, Wisconsin Small Claims Court. He was a Democrat.
