= Joseph P. Murphy =

American politician

Joseph P. Murphy was a member of the Wisconsin State Assembly.

== Biography ==
Murphy was born on April 1, 1899, in Milwaukee, Wisconsin. During World War I, he served in the United States Army.

== Political career ==
Murphy was a member of the Assembly from 1951 to 1958 as a member of the Democratic Party. He was an unsuccessful candidate for re-election in 1958 as an Independent.
