= John S. Crawford =

American politician

John S. Crawford (September 11, 1923 — November 25, 1979) was a member of the Wisconsin State Assembly.

== Biography ==
Crawford was born on September 11, 1923, in Homestead, Pennsylvania. He would graduate from Pennsylvania State University and the University of Wisconsin-Madison. His Master's thesis entitled Italian-American Labor Relations was used as anti-communist propaganda in North Africa. During World War II, he served in the United States Army Air Forces. Crawford was at one point held as a prisoner of war in Italy and would later receive a citation for meritorious service behind enemy lines. He died on November 25, 1979.

== Political career ==
Crawford was elected to the Assembly in 1954, 1956 and 1958. He was a Republican.
