= Milford C. Kintz =

American politician

Milford Clark Kintz was a member of the Wisconsin State Assembly.

== Biography ==
Kintz was born on August 3, 1903, in the town of Richland, Richland County, Wisconsin. He was a farmer.

== Political career ==
Kintz was a member of the Assembly from 1951 to 1964. Previously, he had served as Chairman of the Richland Town Board and on the Richland School Board and Richland County, Wisconsin Board of Supervisors. He was a Republican. He died on September 1, 1998, in Richland Center.
