= Thomas J. Duffey =

American politician

Thomas J. Duffey (December 26, 1927 - December 18, 2016) was a member of the Wisconsin State Assembly.

== Biography ==
Duffey was born in Milwaukee, Wisconsin. He graduated from Marquette University High School and Marquette University. From 1945 to 1948, Duffey served in the United States Navy. He is a member of the American Legion and AMVETS.

== Political career ==
Duffey was elected to the Assembly in 1954. He was a Democrat.
