= Hugo E. Vogel =

American politician

Hugo Emil Vogel (August 29, 1888 – October 25, 1974) was a member of the Wisconsin State Assembly.

He was born in Newton, Manitowoc County, Wisconsin. He would become a barber.

== Political career ==
Vogel was a member of the Assembly from 1955 to 1962. He was a Democrat.
