= George Sokolowski =

American politician

George Sokolowski (1917-1984) was a member of the Wisconsin State Assembly.

== Biography ==
Sokolowski was born on April 21, 1917, in South Milwaukee, Wisconsin. He attended the University of Wisconsin–Extension division in Milwaukee, Wisconsin, and what is now the Milwaukee Area Technical College and became a machinist at the Blackhawk Manufacturing Company. Additionally, he served in the United States Navy. Sokolowski was a member of several organizations, including the Catholic Order of Foresters. He died in May 1984.

== Political career ==
Sokolowski was a member of the Assembly during the 1951, 1953, 1955, 1957 and 1959 sessions. He was a Democrat.
