= Arnold J. Cane =

American lawyer, jurist, and legislator

Arnold J. Cane (December 11, 1914 – September 10, 1968) was an American lawyer, jurist, and legislator.

Born in Ontonagon, Michigan, Cane attended to the public schools in Ontonagon. He then received his doctorate and law degrees from Marquette University. He then practiced law in Menasha, Wisconsin. He served on the Menasha Board of Education and as justice of the peace. Cane served in the Wisconsin State Assembly 1951–1959 was a Republican. In 1962, he was elected a Wisconsin Circuit Court judge serving until his death. Four months before he died, he sustained serious injuries in a car accident, when he was struck by a drunk driver. He died in Neenah, Wisconsin of a heart attack.
