= Paul A. Luedtke =

American politician

Paul August Luedtke was a member of the Wisconsin State Assembly.

== Biography ==
Luedtke was born on August 24, 1888, in Wausau, Wisconsin. He owned a decorating, wallpaper, paint business. He served on the Marathon County, Wisconsin Board of Supervisors and the Wausau Common Council. He died on June 18, 1969.

== Career ==
Luedtke was a member of the Assembly from 1943 to 1962. He was a Republican.
