= Howard F. Pellant =

American politician

Howard F. Pellant (July 23, 1911 – November 22, 1977) was a member of the Wisconsin State Assembly.

== Biography ==
Pellant was born on July 23, 1911, in Milwaukee, Wisconsin, son of George Pellant and Elizabeth Gough. He married Mary Kazmierczak in 1932. Pellant died 22 November 1977 in Milwaukee WI. He was a member of the Fraternal Order of Eagles and the Loyal Order of Moose.

== Career ==
Pellant was elected to the Assembly in 1952. Additionally, he was a delegate to the 1952 Democratic National Convention.
