= Elmer C. Nitschke =

American politician

Elmer C. Nitschke (May 20, 1911 – August 20, 1982) was a member of the Wisconsin State Assembly.

== Biography ==
Nitschke was born on May 20, 1911, in Burnett, Wisconsin. He married Marjorie Sutton in 1934. He died in Beaver Dam, Wisconsin in 1982.

== Career ==
Nitschke was a member of the Assembly from 1949 to 1970. He was a Republican.
