= Richard E. Peterson =

American politician

Richard Ely Peterson (July 17, 1920 – December 21, 2009) was an American politician.

Born in Waupaca, Wisconsin, Peterson was in the United States Army in the 32nd Infantry Division of the Wisconsin Army National Guard during World War II. He was in the Wisconsin State Assembly from 1951 to 1965 as a Republican.

He received his bachelor's and law degrees from the University of Wisconsin–Madison and the University of Wisconsin Law School. He was a family court commissioner, and he and his wife opened an antique store.
