= George Talsky =

American businessman and politician

George Talsky (June 19, 1899 – November 23, 1960) was an American businessman and politician.

Born in Milwaukee, Wisconsin, Talsky was a painter and decorating contractor. He served in the Wisconsin State Assembly as a Democrat from 1957 until his death in 1960. He died in Milwaukee.
