= Louis H. Prange =

American politician

Louis H. Prange was a member of the Wisconsin State Senate.

== Biography ==
Prange was born in the town of Sheboygan Falls on August 19, 1884. He was a dairy farmer and president of a bank. Prange was interested in soil conservation. He died on his birthday August 19, 1957.

== Career ==
Prange was a member of the senate from 1953 until his death. He was a Republican.
