= Leo P. O'Brien =

American politician

Member of the Wisconsin Senate from the 2nd district
- In office 1953–1965
- Preceded by: Fred F. Kaftan
- Succeeded by: Robert W. Warren

Personal details
- Born: July 20, 1893 Fond du Lac, Wisconsin
- Died: March 25, 1968 (aged 74) Green Bay, Wisconsin
- Party: Republican
- Profession: Insurance Salesman

Leo P. O'Brien (July 20, 1893 – March 25, 1968) was a member of the Wisconsin State Senate from the 2nd District.

== Biography ==
O'Brien was born on July 20, 1893, in Fond du Lac, Wisconsin. He attended the University of Wisconsin-Madison, Marquette University and St. Norbert College. During World War I and World War II, he served with the United States Navy. He died in 1968 of a heart attack.

== Political career ==
O'Brien was a member of the Senate from 1953 to 1964. He was a Republican.
