= Harvey R. Abraham =

American politician

Member of the Wisconsin State Assembly from the Winnebago County district
- In office 1947–1960

Personal details
- Born: January 15, 1895 Oshkosh, Wisconsin, U.S.
- Died: November 18, 1973 (aged 78) Oshkosh, Wisconsin, U.S.
- Party: Republican
- Spouse: Jessie Abraham
- Education: Oshkosh Business College
- Profession: Photographic processor Real estate salesman Politician

Harvey R. Abraham (January 15, 1895 – November 18, 1973) was an American photographic processor, real estate salesman and politician. He was a member of the Wisconsin State Assembly during the 1900s.

== Early life ==
Abraham was born in Oshkosh, Wisconsin, educated in the public schools and graduated from Oshkosh Business College. He worked as a sheet metal construction worker before serving overseas in combat duty in the United States Army during World War I. Following his military service, he worked in photographic processing, real estate and as a travelling salesman. He was a member of the American Legion and the Benevolent and Protective Order of Elks.

== Political career ==
Abraham was a member of the Oshkosh City Council. He served as a Republican member of the State Assembly from 1947 to 1960. While in the Assembly, he was Chairman of the Committee on Excise and Fees and a member of the Judiciary Committee and the State Natural Resources Committee.

He died on November 18, 1973, in Oshkosh.

== Personal life ==
Abraham and his wife Jessie (née Beggs) were married on April 3, 1926. They had four children.
