= Joseph A. Greco =

American politician (1919–2006)

Joseph Anthony Greco (December 5, 1919 – September 16, 2006) an American politician. He was a member of the Wisconsin State Assembly.

== Biography ==
Greco was born in Milwaukee, Wisconsin. During World War II, he served in the United States Army. Greco was Roman Catholic and was a member of the Society of the Holy Name. He graduated from Lawrence University and received his law degree from Marquette University Law School. He practiced law in Milwaukee.

== Political career ==
Greco was a member of the Assembly from 1955 to 1960. He was a Democrat.
