= Keith C. Hardie =

American politician

Keith Cameron Hardie (May 16, 1910 – April 7, 1994) was a member of the Wisconsin State Assembly.

== Biography ==
Hardie was born on May 16, 1910, in Franklin, Jackson County, Wisconsin. Hardie owned a fuel oil company and served on the local school board in Ettrick, Wisconsin. In 1961, he was appointed a United States Marshal. He died on April 7, 1994.

== Career ==
Hardie was a member of the Assembly from 1953 to 1960. He was a Democrat.
