= Robert S. Travis =

American politician

Robert S. Travis (May 2, 1909 – August 14, 1980) was a member of the Wisconsin State Assembly and the Wisconsin State Senate.

Travis was born in Platteville, Wisconsin. During World War II, he served in the United States Army crewing a radar truck in the European theater. Travis went to Michigan State University; he was the manager of Irvington Dairy Products on Omaha, Nebraska and was an insurance agent. His son Robert S. Travis, Jr. also served in the Wisconsin Assembly. He died on August 14, 1980, in Platteville, Wisconsin.

== Political career ==
Travis was elected to the Assembly in 1948. He was elected to the Senate in 1954 and re-elected in 1958. Travis was also a delegate to the 1960 Republican National Convention.
