= Warren A. Grady =

20th century American politician and judge

Wisconsin Circuit Judge for the Ozaukee Circuit, Branch 2
- In office August 1, 1978 – 1994
- Preceded by: Transitioned from county court
- Succeeded by: Tom R. Wolfgram

Member of the Wisconsin State Assembly from the Ozaukee County district
- In office January 5, 1953 – January 2, 1961
- Preceded by: Nicholas J. Bichler
- Succeeded by: J. Curtis McKay

City Attorney of Port Washington, Wisconsin
- In office April 1952 – January 1953

Personal details
- Born: March 3, 1924 Port Washington, Wisconsin, U.S.
- Died: December 14, 2019 (aged 95) Baraboo, Wisconsin, U.S.
- Resting place: Cremated
- Party: Republican
- Education: Northwestern University; University of Wisconsin Law School
- Profession: Lawyer, judge

Military service
- Allegiance: United States
- Branch/service: United States Navy
- Years of service: 1943–1945
- Unit: USS LSM-395

Warren Albert Grady (March 3, 1924 – December 14, 2019) was an American lawyer, judge, and Republican politician from Ozaukee County, Wisconsin. He represented Ozaukee County for eight years in the Wisconsin State Assembly and later served 16 years as a Wisconsin circuit court judge.

== Biography ==
Grady was born on March 3, 1924, in Port Washington, Wisconsin. He graduated from Port Washington High School in 1942. Grady also graduated from Northwestern University and the University of Wisconsin-Madison. Grady served in the United States Navy during World War II. He died on December 14, 2019, in Baraboo, Wisconsin.

== Career ==
Grady was first elected to the Wisconsin State Assembly in 1952. He served as Majority Leader for the 1957 session. He was a Republican. Grady served as judge for Ozaukee County, Wisconsin from 1963 to 1995.

Wisconsin State Assembly
Preceded by Nicholas J. Bichler	Member of the Wisconsin State Assembly from the Ozaukee County district January 5, 1953 – January 2, 1961	Succeeded by J. Curtis McKay
Legal offices
New circuit	Wisconsin Circuit Judge for the Ozaukee Circuit, Branch 2 August 1, 1978 – 1994	Succeeded by Tom R. Wolfgram
