= Emil A. Hinz =

American politician

Emil A. Hinz (February 24, 1889 – January 23, 1964) was a member of the Wisconsin State Assembly.

He was born in Proviso Township, Cook County, Illinois. During World War I, he served in the United States Army. He was a secretary of a chesse factory. Hinz died in Merrill, Wisconsin as a result of a fall down a flight of steps at an appliance store.

== Political career ==
Hinz was a member of the Assembly from 1947 to 1962. Additionally, he was Treasurer and Chairman of Merrill, Wisconsin and a member and Chairman of the Lincoln County, Wisconsin Board of Supervisors. He was a Republican.
