= 69th Wisconsin Legislature =

Wisconsin legislative term for 1949–1950

←	68th	70th	→
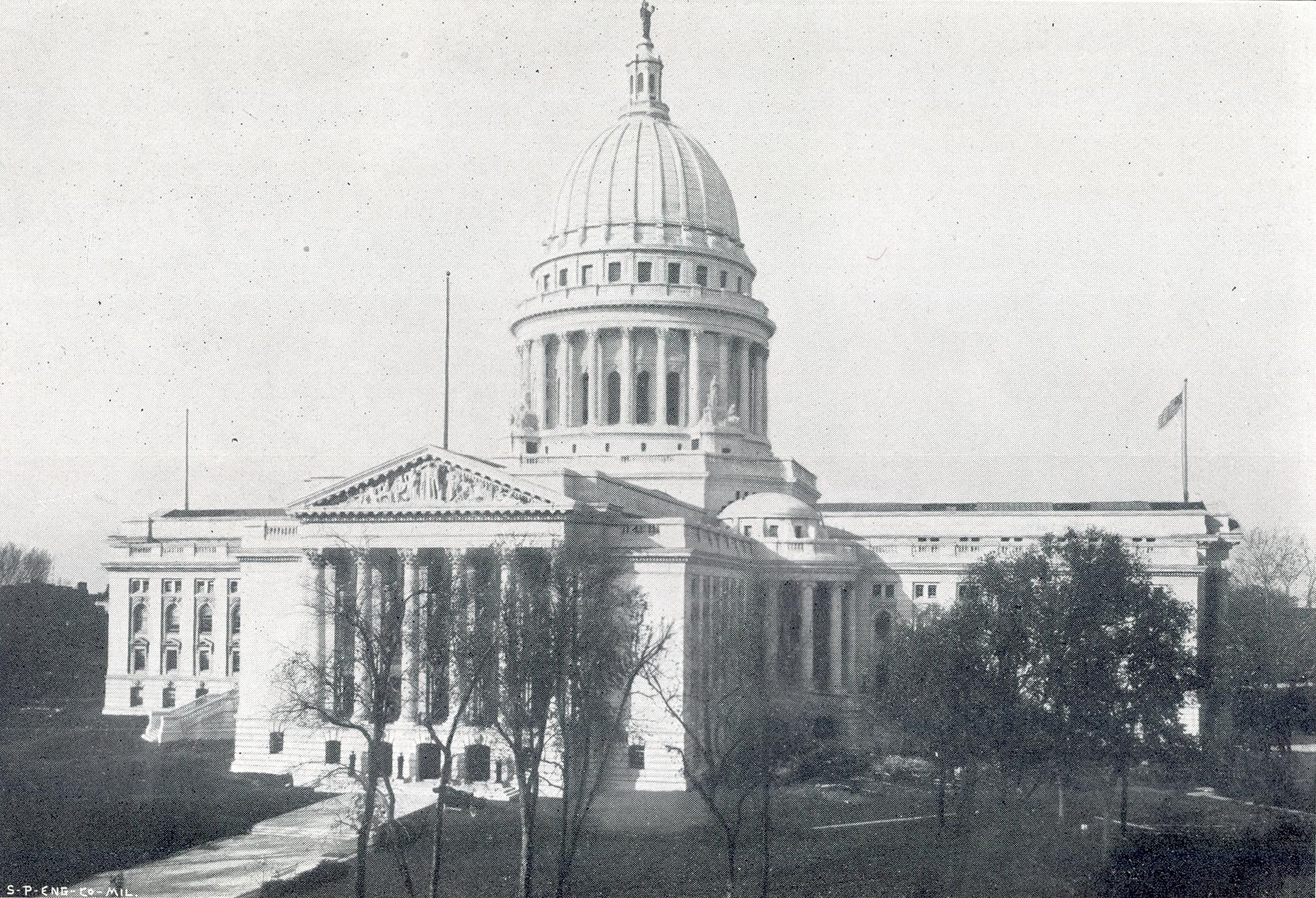
- Wisconsin State Capitol ca.1915

Overview
- Legislative body: Wisconsin Legislature
- Meeting place: Wisconsin State Capitol
- Term: January 3, 1949 – January 1, 1951
- Election: November 2, 1948

Senate
- Members: 33
- Senate President: George M. Smith (R)
- President pro tempore: Frank E. Panzer (R)
- Party control: Republican

Assembly
- Members: 100
- Assembly Speaker: Alex L. Nicol (R)
- Party control: Republican

Sessions
- Regular: January 12, 1949 – September 13, 1949

The Sixty-Ninth Wisconsin Legislature convened from January 12, 1949, to September 13, 1949, in regular session.

This session saw the first legislative terms of Gaylord Nelson, Patrick Lucey, Ruth Bachhuber Doyle, and Robert T. Huber, all of whom would—over the course of the subsequent two decades—play important roles in the transition of the Democratic Party of Wisconsin from a permanent minority party to competitive status with the state Republican Party, by winning over many former Wisconsin Progressive Party voters.

Senators representing even-numbered districts were newly elected for this session and were serving the first two years of a four-year term. Assembly members were elected to a two-year term. Assembly members and even-numbered senators were elected in the general election of November 2, 1948. Senators representing odd-numbered districts were serving the third and fourth year of a four-year term, having been elected in the general election of November 5, 1946.

The governor of Wisconsin during this entire term was Republican Oscar Rennebohm, of Dane County, serving his first full two-year term, having won election in the 1948 Wisconsin gubernatorial election. He had previously been elected lieutenant governor in 1946, and ascended to the gubernatorial office following the death of governor Walter Samuel Goodland in March 1947.

== Major events ==
- January 3, 1949: Second inauguration of Oscar Rennebohm as Governor of Wisconsin.
- January 20, 1949: Second inauguration of Harry S. Truman as President of the United States.
- April 4, 1949: The North Atlantic Treaty was signed by representatives of twelve countries, including the United States, establishing the NATO defensive alliance.
- April 5, 1949: 1949 Wisconsin Spring election:
  - Edward J. Gehl was elected to the Wisconsin Supreme Court.
  - Wisconsin voters ratified an amendment to the state constitution to allow the state to take on debt to pay for veterans' housing.
  - Wisconsin voters rejected an amendment to the state constitution to repeal the prohibition on taxing federal lands.
- June 19, 1949: Wisconsin Supreme Court justice John D. Wickhem died in office.
- August 29, 1949: The Soviet Union held their first succerssful atomic bomb test.
- July 14, 1949: Wisconsin Governor Oscar Rennebohm appointed Timothy Brown to the Wisconsin Supreme Court, to succeed the deceased justice John D. Wickhem.
- October 1, 1949: Mao Zedong proclaimed the establishment of the People's Republic of China.
- December 7, 1949: The government of the Republic of China retreated to the island of Taiwan and declared Taipei to be their new capital.
- June 25, 1950:
  - Forces of the Korean People's Army began an invasion of the Republic of Korea, initiating the Korean War.
  - The United Nations Security Council unanimously adopted United Nations Security Council Resolution 82, condemning North Korea's invasion of South Korea.
- June 27, 1950: U.S. president Harry Truman ordered U.S. forces to the defense of the Republic of Korea.
- October 19, 1950: Chinese forces joined the Korean War, supporting North Korea.
- November 7, 1950: 1950 United States general election:
  - Walter J. Kohler Jr. elected Governor of Wisconsin.
  - Alexander Wiley re-elected United States senator from Wisconsin.

== Major legislation ==
- August 11, 1949: An Act ... relating to discontinuing the Wisconsin veterans' authority and transferring its functions to the department of veterans' affairs, a veterans' housing trust fund, veterans' housing loans, incentive grants for veterans' housing and making appropriations, 1949 Act 627. Utilized the recently ratified amendment to the state constitution to create new veterans programs.
- 1949 Joint Resolution 1: Second legislative passage of a proposed amendment to the state constitution to enable the state to take on debt to pay for veterans' housing. This amendment was ratified by voters at the April 1949 election.
- 1949 Joint Resolution 2: Second legislative passage of a proposed amendment to the state constitution to repeal a portion of the constitution which had prohibited taxing land owned by the federal government. This amendment was rejected by voters at the April 1949 election. But the same amendment was later ratified in 1951.

== Party summary ==
=== Senate summary ===
Senate partisan composition Democratic: 6 seats Republican: 26 seats Vacant: 1 seat

	Party (Shading indicates majority caucus)			Total	
	Dem.	Prog.	Rep.	Total	Vacant
End of previous Legislature	5	1	27	33	0
Start of Reg. Session (Note: Democrats Clement J. Zablocki (3rd District) and Anthony P. Gawronski (7th District) and Republican Charles D. Madsen (29th District) resigned before the start of the session.)	3	0	27	30	3
From Mar. 4, 1949 (Note: Republican Edward F. Hilker (21st District) died.)	3	0	26	29	4
From Apr. 19, 1949 (Note: Democrats Casimir Kendziorski (3rd District), Roman R. Blenski (7th District), and John E. Olson (29th District) were sworn in.)	6	0	26	32	1
Final voting share	18.75%		81.25%		
Beginning of the next Legislature	7	0	26	33	0

=== Assembly summary ===
Assembly partisan composition Democratic: 25 seats Republican: 74 seats Vacant: 1 seat

	Party (Shading indicates majority caucus)		Total	
	Dem.	Rep.	Total	Vacant
End of previous Legislature	12	87	98	1
Start of Reg. Session	26	74	100	0
From Apr. 5, 1949 (Note: Democrat Casimir Kendziorski (Milwaukee County) resigned after being elected to the Wisconsin Senate.)	25	74	99	1
From Jul. 23, 1949 (Note: Republican John D. Heimick (Milwaukee County) died.)	25	73	98	2
From Dec. 9, 1949 (Note: Democrat William Banach (Milwaukee County) resigned.)	24	73	97	3
From Apr. 13, 1950 (Note: Republican Glenn W. Birkett (Racine County) died.)	24	72	96	4
Final voting share	25%	75%		
Beginning of the next Legislature	24	76	100	0

== Sessions ==
- Regular session: January 12, 1949 – September 13, 1949

== Leaders ==
=== Senate leadership ===
- President of the Senate: George M. Smith (R)
- President pro tempore: Frank E. Panzer (R–Oakfield)
- Majority leader: Warren P. Knowles (R–New Richmond)

=== Assembly leadership ===
- Speaker of the Assembly: Alex L. Nicol (R–Sparta)
- Majority leader: Vernon W. Thomson (R–Richland Center)
- Minority leader: Leland McParland (D–Milwaukee)

== Members ==
=== Members of the Senate ===
Members of the Senate for the Sixty-Ninth Wisconsin Legislature:

Senate partisan representation Democratic: 6 seats Republican: 25 seats Vacant: 1 seat

Dist.	Counties	Senator	Residence	Party
01	Door, Kewaunee, & Manitowoc	Everett LaFond	Two Rivers	Rep.
02	Brown & Oconto	Fred F. Kaftan	Green Bay	Rep.
03	Milwaukee (South City)	--Vacant until Apr. 19, 1949--		
03	Milwaukee (South City)	Casimir Kendziorski	Milwaukee	Dem.
04	Milwaukee (Northeast County & Northeast City)	George A. Mayer	Milwaukee	Rep.
05	Milwaukee (Northwest City)	Bernhard Gettelman	Milwaukee	Rep.
06	Milwaukee (North-Central City)	William A. Schmidt	Milwaukee	Dem.
07	Milwaukee (Southeast County & Southeast City)	--Vacant until Apr. 19, 1949--		
07	Milwaukee (Southeast County & Southeast City)	Roman R. Blenski	Milwaukee	Dem.
08	Milwaukee (Western County)	Allen Busby	West Milwaukee	Rep.
09	Milwaukee (City Downtown)	Robert E. Tehan	Milwaukee	Dem.
10	Buffalo, Pepin, Pierce, & St. Croix	Warren P. Knowles	New Richmond	Rep.
11	Bayfield, Burnett, Douglas, & Washburn	Arthur Lenroot Jr.	Superior	Rep.
12	Ashland, Iron, Price, Rusk, Sawyer, & Vilas	Clayton Hicks	Phillips	Rep.
13	Dodge & Washington	Frank E. Panzer	Oakfield	Rep.
14	Outagamie & Shawano	Gordon A. Bubolz	Appleton	Rep.
15	Rock	Robert P. Robinson	Beloit	Rep.
16	Crawford, Grant, & Vernon	Foster B. Porter	Bloomington	Rep.
17	Green, Iowa, & Lafayette	Melvin Olson	South Wayne	Rep.
18	Fond du Lac, Green Lake & Waushara	Alfred Van De Zande	Campbellsport	Rep.
19	Calumet & Winnebago	Taylor G. Brown	Oshkosh	Rep.
20	Ozaukee & Sheboygan	Gustave W. Buchen	Sheboygan	Rep.
21	Racine	Edward F. Hilker (died Mar. 4, 1949)	Racine	Rep.
21	Racine	--Vacant from Mar. 4, 1949--		
22	Kenosha & Walworth	William Trinke	Lake Geneva	Rep.
23	Portage & Waupaca	Oscar W. Neale	Stevens Point	Rep.
24	Clark, Taylor, & Wood	Melvin Laird Jr.	Marshfield	Rep.
25	Lincoln & Marathon	Clifford Krueger	Merrill	Rep.
26	Dane	Gaylord Nelson	Madison	Dem.
27	Columbia, Richland, & Sauk	Jess Miller	Richland Center	Rep.
28	Chippewa & Eau Claire	Arthur L. Padrutt	Chippewa Falls	Rep.
29	Barron, Dunn, & Polk	--Vacant until Apr. 19, 1949--		
29	Barron, Dunn, & Polk	John E. Olson	Chetek	Dem.
30	Florence, Forest, Langlade, Marinette, & Oneida	Philip Downing	Amberg	Rep.
31	Adams, Juneau, Monroe, & Marquette	J. Earl Leverich	Sparta	Rep.
32	Jackson, La Crosse, & Trempealeau	Rudolph Schlabach	La Crosse	Rep.
33	Jefferson & Waukesha	Chester Dempsey	Hartland	Rep.

=== Members of the Assembly ===
Members of the Assembly for the Sixty-Ninth Wisconsin Legislature:

Assembly partisan composition Democratic: 25 seats Republican: 74 seats Vacant: 1 seat

Milwaukee County districts

Senate Dist.	County	Dist.	Representative	Party	Residence
31	Adams & Marquette		Louis C. Romell	Rep.	Adams
12	Ashland		Bernard J. Gehrmann	Rep.	Mellen
29	Barron		Charles H. Sykes	Rep.	Cameron
11	Bayfield		Samuel E. Squires	Rep.	Mason
02	Brown	1	Robert E. Lynch	Dem.	Green Bay
02	Brown	2	William J. Duffy	Dem.	Wrightstown
10	Buffalo & Pepin		Edmund Hitt	Rep.	Alma
11	Burnett & Washburn		Holger Rasmusen	Rep.	Spooner
19	Calumet		Henry M. Peters	Rep.	Menasha
28	Chippewa		Sylvia H. Raihle	Rep.	Chippewa Falls
24	Clark		Arthur E. Stadler	Rep.	Owen
27	Columbia		Arnie F. Betts	Rep.	Lodi
16	Crawford		Patrick Lucey	Dem.	Ferryville
26	Dane	1	Ruth Bachhuber Doyle	Dem.	Madison
26	Dane	2	John M. Blaska	Dem.	Marshall
26	Dane	3	Hermann Eisner	Dem.	Cross Plains
13	Dodge	1	Elmer L. Genzmer	Rep.	Mayville
13	Dodge	2	Elmer C. Nitschke	Rep.	Burnett
01	Door		Hallie H. Rowe	Rep.	Sturgeon Bay
11	Douglas	1	Byron C. Ostby	Rep.	Superior
11	Douglas	2	Charles E. Nelson	Rep.	Superior
29	Dunn		Earl W. Hanson	Rep.	Elk Mound
28	Eau Claire		John T. Pritchard	Rep.	Eau Claire
30	Florence, Forest, & Oneida		Clarence W. Gilley	Rep.	Rhinelander
18	Fond du Lac	1	Myrton H. Duel	Rep.	Fond du Lac
18	Fond du Lac	2	Charles A. Peterson	Rep.	Rosendale
16	Grant	1	Robert S. Travis	Rep.	Platteville
16	Grant	2	Hugh A. Harper	Rep.	Lancaster
17	Green		Harry A. Keegan	Rep.	Monroe
18	Green Lake & Waushara		Halbert W. Brooks	Rep.	Green Lake
17	Iowa		Robert McCutchin	Rep.	Arena
12	Iron & Vilas		William R. Yeschek	Rep.	Lac du Flambeau
32	Jackson		Casper D. Waller	Rep.	Black River Falls
33	Jefferson		Theodore S. Jones	Rep.	Lake Mills
31	Juneau		Ben Tremain	Rep.	Hustler
22	Kenosha	1	Frederick Pfennig	Rep.	Kenosha
22	Kenosha	2	George Molinaro	Dem.	Kenosha
01	Kewaunee		Julius Stangel	Rep.	Kewaunee
32	La Crosse	1	Raymond Bice Sr.	Rep.	La Crosse
32	La Crosse	2	Harry W. Schilling	Rep.	Onalaska
17	Lafayette		Martin O. Monson	Rep.	South Wayne
30	Langlade		Clair Finch	Rep.	Antigo
25	Lincoln		Emil A. Hinz	Rep.	Merrill
01	Manitowoc	1	John A. Norman	Rep.	Manitowoc
01	Manitowoc	2	Adolph Strouf	Dem.	Two Rivers
25	Marathon	1	Martin C. Lueck	Rep.	Hamburg
25	Marathon	2	Paul A. Luedtke	Rep.	Wausau
30	Marinette		Roy H. Sengstock	Rep.	Marinette
09	Milwaukee	1	Thomas A. Hickey	Dem.	Milwaukee
06	Milwaukee	2	Michael F. O'Connell	Dem.	Milwaukee
08	Milwaukee	3	Robert T. Huber	Dem.	West Allis
09	Milwaukee	4	Frank E. Schaeffer Jr.	Dem.	Milwaukee
03	Milwaukee	5	Casimir Kendziorski (until Apr. 5, 1949)	Dem.	Milwaukee
03	Milwaukee	5	--Vacant from Apr. 5, 1949--		
09	Milwaukee	6	Le Roy Simmons	Dem.	Milwaukee
06	Milwaukee	7	John Schaller	Dem.	Milwaukee
08	Milwaukee	8	Albert Hammond	Dem.	Milwaukee
05	Milwaukee	9	Eugene M. Lamb	Rep.	Milwaukee
07	Milwaukee	10	Leland McParland	Dem.	Cudahy
03	Milwaukee	11	Ervin J. Ryczek	Dem.	Milwaukee
07	Milwaukee	12	William Banach (res. Dec. 9, 1949)	Dem.	Milwaukee
04	Milwaukee	13	Ralph Landowski	Dem.	Milwaukee
04	Milwaukee	14	John D. Heimick (died Jul. 23, 1949)	Rep.	Milwaukee
05	Milwaukee	15	Raleigh W. Falbe	Rep.	Milwaukee
06	Milwaukee	16	Edward F. Mertz	Dem.	Milwaukee
07	Milwaukee	17	Martin F. Howard	Rep.	Milwaukee
06	Milwaukee	18	Charles J. Schmidt	Dem.	Milwaukee
05	Milwaukee	19	Charles F. Westfahl	Rep.	Milwaukee
08	Milwaukee	20	Milton F. Burmaster	Rep.	Wauwatosa
31	Monroe		Alex L. Nicol	Rep.	Sparta
02	Oconto		John E. Youngs	Rep.	Oconto
14	Outagamie	1	Mark Catlin Jr.	Rep.	Appleton
14	Outagamie	2	William M. Rohan	Rep.	Kaukauna
20	Ozaukee		Ralph Zaun	Rep.	Grafton
10	Pierce		Selmer W. Gunderson	Rep.	Spring Valley
29	Polk		Raymond A. Peabody	Rep.	Milltown
23	Portage		John Kostuck	Dem.	Stevens Point
12	Price		Vincent J. Zellinger	Rep.	Phillips
21	Racine	1	Harold Gade	Dem.	Racine
21	Racine	2	Thomas C. Taylor	Dem.	Racine
21	Racine	3	Glenn W. Birkett (died Apr. 13, 1950)	Rep.	Burlington
27	Richland		Vernon W. Thomson	Rep.	Richland Center
15	Rock	1	Edward Grassman	Rep.	Edgerton
15	Rock	2	Burger M. Engebretson	Rep.	Beloit
12	Rusk & Sawyer		Paul J. Rogan	Rep.	Ladysmith
27	Sauk		James R. Stone	Rep.	Baraboo
14	Shawano		Robert G. Marotz	Rep.	Shawano
20	Sheboygan	1	John Schneider Jr.	Dem.	Sheboygan
20	Sheboygan	2	Henry W. Timmer	Rep.	Waldo
10	St. Croix		William A. Bergeron	Rep.	Somerset
24	Taylor		Nels Andersen	Rep.	Gilman
32	Trempealeau		Guilford M. Wiley	Rep.	Galesville
16	Vernon		Arthur O. Mockrud	Rep.	Westby
22	Walworth		Ora R. Rice	Rep.	Delavan
13	Washington		Theodore Holtebeck	Rep.	West Bend
33	Waukesha	1	Alvin J. Redford	Rep.	Waukesha
33	Waukesha	2	Alfred R. Ludvigsen	Rep.	Hartland
23	Waupaca		Julius Spearbraker	Rep.	Clintonville
19	Winnebago	1	Harvey R. Abraham	Rep.	Oshkosh
19	Winnebago	2	Richard J. Steffens	Rep.	Menasha
24	Wood		William W. Clark	Rep.	Vesper

== Committees ==
=== Senate committees ===
- Senate Standing Committee on Agriculture and Conservation – M. Olson, chair
- Senate Standing Committee on Committees – J. Miller, chair
- Senate Standing Committee on Contingent Expenditures – B. Gettelman, chair
- Senate Standing Committee on Education and Public Welfare – R. P. Robinson, chair
- Senate Standing Committee on Highways – J. Miller, chair
- Senate Standing Committee on the Judiciary – G. W. Buchen, chair
- Senate Standing Committee on Labor and Management – G. A. Bubolz, chair
- Senate Standing Committee on Legislative Procedure – F. E. Panzer, chair
- Senate Standing Committee on State and Local Government – R. Schlabach, chair
- Senate Standing Committee on Veterans Affairs – M. Laird, chair

=== Assembly committees ===
- Assembly Standing Committee on Agriculture – O. R. Rice, chair
- Assembly Standing Committee on Commerce and Manufacturing – E. A. Hinz, chair
- Assembly Standing Committee on Conservation – R. S. Travis, chair
- Assembly Standing Committee on Contingent Expenditures – B. Tremain, chair
- Assembly Standing Committee on Education – W. W. Clark, chair
- Assembly Standing Committee on Elections – H. W. Timmer, chair
- Assembly Standing Committee on Engrossed Bills – W. M. Rohan, chair
- Assembly Standing Committee on Enrolled Bills – T. S. Jones, chair
- Assembly Standing Committee on Excise and Fees – H. R. Abraham, chair
- Assembly Standing Committee on Highways – H. A. Harper, chair
- Assembly Standing Committee on Insurance and Banking – F. Pfennig, chair
- Assembly Standing Committee on the Judiciary – V. W. Thomson, chair
- Assembly Standing Committee on Labor – E. L. Genzmer, chair
- Assembly Standing Committee on Municipalities – P. A. Luedtke, chair
- Assembly Standing Committee on Printing – A. F. Betts, chair
- Assembly Standing Committee on Public Welfare – E. W. Hanson, chair
- Assembly Standing Committee on Revision – E. W. Hanson, chair
- Assembly Standing Committee on Rules – J. Spearbraker, chair
- Assembly Standing Committee on State Affairs – B. J. Gehrmann, chair
- Assembly Standing Committee on Taxation – M. F. Burmaster, chair
- Assembly Standing Committee on Third Reading – C. E. Nelson, chair
- Assembly Standing Committee on Transportation – R. Bice, chair
- Assembly Standing Committee on Veterans and Military Affairs – M. Catlin, chair

=== Joint committees ===
- Joint Standing Committee on Finance – F. B. Porter (Sen.) & A. R. Ludvigsen (Asm.), co-chairs
- Joint Standing Committee on Revisions, Repeals, and Uniform Laws – A. Busby (Sen.) & C. Finch (Asm.), co-chairs
- Joint Legislative Council – M. Laird (Sen.), chair

== Employees ==
=== Senate employees ===
- Chief Clerk: Thomas M. Donahue
- Sergeant-at-Arms: Harold Damon
  - Assistant Sergeant-at-Arms: Edward R. Stoker

=== Assembly employees ===
- Chief Clerk: Arthur L. May
  - Assistant Chief Clerk: Robert H. Boyson
- Sergeant-at-Arms: Norris J. Kellman
  - Assistant Sergeant-at-Arms: Thomas A. Austin
