= 70th Wisconsin Legislature =

Wisconsin legislative term for 1951–1952

←	69th	71st	→
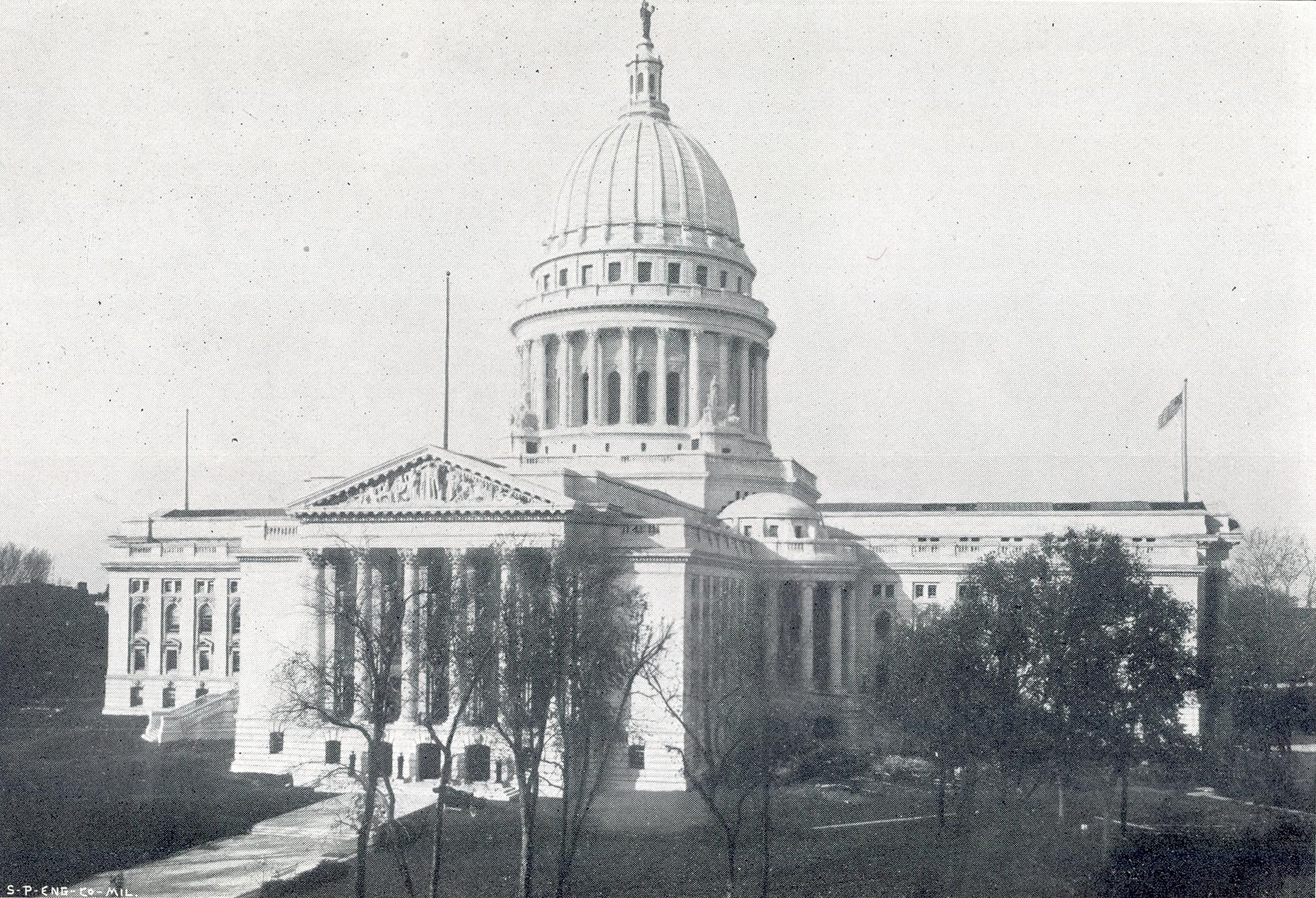
- Wisconsin State Capitol ca.1915

Overview
- Legislative body: Wisconsin Legislature
- Meeting place: Wisconsin State Capitol
- Term: January 1, 1951 – January 5, 1953
- Election: November 7, 1950

Senate
- Members: 33
- Senate President: George M. Smith (R)
- President pro tempore: Frank E. Panzer (R)
- Party control: Republican

Assembly
- Members: 100
- Assembly Speaker: Ora R. Rice (R)
- Party control: Republican

Sessions
- Regular: January 10, 1951 – June 14, 1951

The Seventieth Wisconsin Legislature convened from January 10, 1951, to June 14, 1951, in regular session.

Senators representing odd-numbered districts were newly elected for this session and were serving the first two years of a four-year term. Assembly members were elected to a two-year term. Assembly members and odd-numbered senators were elected in the general election of November 7, 1950. Senators representing even-numbered districts were serving the third and fourth year of a four-year term, having been elected in the general election of November 2, 1948.

The governor of Wisconsin during this entire term was Republican Walter J. Kohler Jr., of Sheboygan County, serving a two-year term, having won election in the 1950 Wisconsin gubernatorial election.

== Major events ==
- January 1, 1951: Inauguration of Walter J. Kohler Jr. as the 33rd Governor of Wisconsin.
- February 27, 1951: The Twenty-second Amendment to the United States Constitution came into force, establishing the two term limit for U.S. presidents.
- April 3, 1951: Wisconsin voters ratified two amendments to the state constitution:
  - Repealing the prohibition on taxing federal lands.
  - Setting an 8% combined municipal debt limit for city and school purposes.
- April 11, 1951: Amidst disagreements over strategy in the Korean War, U.S. president Harry Truman relieved General Douglas MacArthur from command.
- May 8, 1951: The first thermonuclear weapon was tested by the United States at Enewetak Atoll.
- July 28, 1951: The Convention Relating to the Status of Refugees was signed.
- August 13, 1951: Wisconsin Supreme Court justice Henry P. Hughes resigned.
- September 1, 1951:
  - Wisconsin Governor Walter J. Kohler appointed George R. Currie to the Wisconsin Supreme Court, to succeed Henry P. Hughes.
  - The United States, Australia, and New Zealand signed the ANZUS mutual defense pact.
- September 8, 1951: The United States and Japan signed the Security Treaty between the United States and Japan, allowing for a continuation of United States military forces basing in Japan.
- February 6, 1952: King George VI of the United Kingdom died and was immediately succeeded by his daughter, who was later crowned as Queen Elizabeth II.
- November 4, 1952: 1952 United States general election:
  - Dwight D. Eisenhower elected President of the United States.
  - Walter J. Kohler Jr. re-elected Governor of Wisconsin.
  - Joseph McCarthy re-elected United States senator from Wisconsin.
  - Wisconsin voters rejected a non-binding referendum on changes to constitutional guidelines for redistricting. Holding the referendum was part of a compromise which enabled the passage of the Rosenberry redistricting plan.

== Major legislation ==
- April 12, 1951: An Act ... relating to the inclusion of public employes under the Federal Old Age and Survivors Insurance System, and making an appropriation, 1951 Act 60. Created the Wisconsin Public Employees Social Security Fund, and made Wisconsin the first state to allow some state and local employees to be covered by Social Security.
- July 10, 1951: An Act ... relating to civil defense, 1951 Act 443. Established the state office of civil defense.
- August 17, 1951: An Act ... relating to the apportionment of assemblymen and senators, 1951 Act 728. This was the first full legislative redistricting of Wisconsin since 1921. This plan was the product of a nonpartisan redistricting commission, popularly referred to as the "Rosenberry Commission" for its chairman, the former Wisconsin Supreme Court chief justice Marvin B. Rosenberry. Because of a compromise, implementation of the plan was delayed until the 1954 election to allow the consideration of a constitutional amendment which would have altered redistricting rules.

== Party summary ==
=== Senate summary ===
Senate partisan composition Democratic: 7 seats Republican: 26 seats

	Party (Shading indicates majority caucus)		Total	
	Dem.	Rep.	Total	Vacant
End of previous Legislature	6	26	32	1
Start of Reg. Session	7	26	33	0
From Dec. 3, 1951 (Note: Republican Gustave W. Buchen (20th District) died.)	7	25	32	1
Final voting share	21.88%	78.13%		
Beginning of the next Legislature	7	26	33	0

=== Assembly summary ===
Assembly partisan composition Democratic: 23 seats Republican: 76 seats Vacant: 1 seat

	Party (Shading indicates majority caucus)		Total	
	Dem.	Rep.	Total	Vacant
End of previous Legislature	24	72	96	4
Start of Reg. Session	24	76	100	0
From Mar. 24, 1951 (Note: Democrat William Banach (Milwaukee County) died.)	23	76	99	1
Final voting share	23.23%	76.77%		
Beginning of the next Legislature	25	75	100	0

== Sessions ==
- Regular session: January 10, 1951 – June 14, 1951

== Leaders ==
=== Senate leadership ===
- President of the Senate: George M. Smith (R)
- President pro tempore: Frank E. Panzer (R–Oakfield)
- Majority leader: Warren P. Knowles (R–New Richmond)
- Minority leader: Gaylord Nelson (D–Madison)

=== Assembly leadership ===
- Speaker of the Assembly: Ora R. Rice (R–Delavan)
- Majority leader: Arthur O. Mockrud (R–Westby)
- Minority leader: George Molinaro (D–Kenosha)

== Members ==
=== Members of the Senate ===
Members of the Senate for the Seventieth Wisconsin Legislature:

Senate partisan representation Democratic: 7 seats Republican: 26 seats

Dist.	Counties	Senator	Residence	Party
01	Door, Kewaunee, & Manitowoc	Everett LaFond	Two Rivers	Rep.
02	Brown & Oconto	Fred F. Kaftan	Green Bay	Rep.
03	Milwaukee (South City)	Casimir Kendziorski	Milwaukee	Dem.
04	Milwaukee (Northeast County & Northeast City)	George A. Mayer	Milwaukee	Rep.
05	Milwaukee (Northwest City)	Bernhard Gettelman	Milwaukee	Rep.
06	Milwaukee (North-Central City)	William A. Schmidt	Milwaukee	Dem.
07	Milwaukee (Southeast County & Southeast City)	Roman R. Blenski	Milwaukee	Dem.
08	Milwaukee (Western County)	Allen Busby	West Milwaukee	Rep.
09	Milwaukee (City Downtown)	Henry Maier	Milwaukee	Dem.
10	Buffalo, Pepin, Pierce, & St. Croix	Warren P. Knowles	New Richmond	Rep.
11	Bayfield, Burnett, Douglas, & Washburn	Arthur Lenroot Jr.	Superior	Rep.
12	Ashland, Iron, Price, Rusk, Sawyer, & Vilas	Clayton Hicks	Phillips	Rep.
13	Dodge & Washington	Frank E. Panzer	Oakfield	Rep.
14	Outagamie & Shawano	Gordon A. Bubolz	Appleton	Rep.
15	Rock	Robert P. Robinson	Beloit	Rep.
16	Crawford, Grant, & Vernon	Foster B. Porter	Bloomington	Rep.
17	Green, Iowa, & Lafayette	Melvin Olson	South Wayne	Rep.
18	Fond du Lac, Green Lake & Waushara	Alfred Van De Zande	Campbellsport	Rep.
19	Calumet & Winnebago	William Draheim	Neenah	Dem.
20	Ozaukee & Sheboygan	Gustave W. Buchen (died Dec. 3, 1951)	Sheboygan	Rep.
21	Racine	Gerald T. Flynn	Racine	Dem.
22	Kenosha & Walworth	William Trinke	Lake Geneva	Rep.
23	Portage & Waupaca	Oscar W. Neale	Stevens Point	Rep.
24	Clark, Taylor, & Wood	Melvin Laird Jr.	Marshfield	Rep.
25	Lincoln & Marathon	Clifford Krueger	Merrill	Rep.
26	Dane	Gaylord Nelson	Madison	Dem.
27	Columbia, Richland, & Sauk	Jess Miller	Richland Center	Rep.
28	Chippewa & Eau Claire	Arthur L. Padrutt	Chippewa Falls	Rep.
29	Barron, Dunn, & Polk	William E. Owen	Menomonie	Rep.
30	Florence, Forest, Langlade, Marinette, & Oneida	Philip Downing	Amberg	Rep.
31	Adams, Juneau, Monroe, & Marquette	J. Earl Leverich	Sparta	Rep.
32	Jackson, La Crosse, & Trempealeau	Rudolph Schlabach	La Crosse	Rep.
33	Jefferson & Waukesha	Chester Dempsey	Hartland	Rep.

=== Members of the Assembly ===
Members of the Assembly for the Seventieth Wisconsin Legislature:

Assembly partisan composition Democratic: 23 seats Republican: 76 seats Vacant: 1 seat

Milwaukee County districts

Senate Dist.	County	Dist.	Representative	Party	Residence
31	Adams & Marquette		Louis C. Romell	Rep.	Adams
12	Ashland		Bernard J. Gehrmann	Rep.	Mellen
29	Barron		Charles H. Sykes	Rep.	Cameron
11	Bayfield		Vic C. Wallin	Rep.	Grand View
02	Brown	1	Robert E. Lynch	Dem.	Green Bay
02	Brown	2	Harvey Larsen	Rep.	Denmark
10	Buffalo & Pepin		Mamre H. Ward	Rep.	Durand
11	Burnett & Washburn		Holger Rasmusen	Rep.	Spooner
19	Calumet		Henry M. Peters	Rep.	Menasha
28	Chippewa		Sylvia H. Raihle	Rep.	Chippewa Falls
24	Clark		Walter E. Cook	Rep.	Unity
27	Columbia		Arnie F. Betts	Rep.	Lodi
16	Crawford		Rodney J. Satter	Rep.	Prairie du Chien
26	Dane	1	Ruth Bachhuber Doyle	Dem.	Madison
26	Dane	2	William Proxmire	Dem.	Madison
26	Dane	3	Hermann Eisner	Dem.	Cross Plains
13	Dodge	1	Elmer L. Genzmer	Rep.	Mayville
13	Dodge	2	Elmer C. Nitschke	Rep.	Burnett
01	Door		Frank N. Graass	Rep.	Sturgeon Bay
11	Douglas	1	Byron C. Ostby	Rep.	Superior
11	Douglas	2	Charles E. Nelson	Rep.	Superior
29	Dunn		G. H. Bakke	Rep.	Menomonie
28	Eau Claire		John T. Pritchard	Rep.	Eau Claire
30	Florence, Forest, & Oneida		Clarence W. Gilley	Rep.	Rhinelander
18	Fond du Lac	1	Nicholas J. Lesselyoung	Rep.	Fond du Lac
18	Fond du Lac	2	Charles A. Peterson	Rep.	Rosendale
16	Grant	1	Robert S. Travis	Rep.	Platteville
16	Grant	2	Hugh A. Harper	Rep.	Lancaster
17	Green		Harry A. Keegan	Rep.	Monroe
18	Green Lake & Waushara		Halbert W. Brooks	Rep.	Green Lake
17	Iowa		Robert McCutchin	Rep.	Arena
12	Iron & Vilas		Arne H. Wicklund	Dem.	Gile
32	Jackson		Larry D. Gilbertson	Rep.	Black River Falls
33	Jefferson		Theodore S. Jones	Rep.	Lake Mills
31	Juneau		Ben Tremain	Rep.	Hustler
22	Kenosha	1	Joseph Lourigan	Dem.	Kenosha
22	Kenosha	2	George Molinaro	Dem.	Kenosha
01	Kewaunee		Julius Stangel	Rep.	Kewaunee
32	La Crosse	1	Raymond Bice Sr.	Rep.	La Crosse
32	La Crosse	2	Harry W. Schilling	Rep.	Onalaska
17	Lafayette		Martin O. Monson	Rep.	South Wayne
30	Langlade		Walter D. Cavers	Rep.	Antigo
25	Lincoln		Emil A. Hinz	Rep.	Merrill
01	Manitowoc	1	John A. Norman	Rep.	Manitowoc
01	Manitowoc	2	Frank J. LeClair	Rep.	Two Rivers
25	Marathon	1	Martin C. Lueck	Rep.	Hamburg
25	Marathon	2	Paul A. Luedtke	Rep.	Wausau
30	Marinette		Roy H. Sengstock	Rep.	Marinette
09	Milwaukee	1	Robert W. Landry	Dem.	Milwaukee
06	Milwaukee	2	Michael F. O'Connell	Dem.	Milwaukee
08	Milwaukee	3	Robert T. Huber	Dem.	West Allis
09	Milwaukee	4	Frank E. Schaeffer Jr.	Dem.	Milwaukee
03	Milwaukee	5	George Sokolowski	Dem.	Milwaukee
09	Milwaukee	6	Le Roy Simmons	Dem.	Milwaukee
06	Milwaukee	7	John Schaller	Dem.	Milwaukee
08	Milwaukee	8	Joseph P. Murphy	Dem.	Milwaukee
05	Milwaukee	9	Eugene M. Lamb	Rep.	Milwaukee
07	Milwaukee	10	Leland McParland	Dem.	Cudahy
03	Milwaukee	11	Ervin J. Ryczek	Dem.	Milwaukee
07	Milwaukee	12	William Banach (died Mar. 24, 1951)	Dem.	Milwaukee
07	Milwaukee	12	--Vacant from Mar. 24, 1951--		
04	Milwaukee	13	Ralph Landowski	Dem.	Milwaukee
04	Milwaukee	14	Harry F. Franke Jr.	Rep.	Milwaukee
05	Milwaukee	15	Raleigh W. Falbe	Rep.	Milwaukee
06	Milwaukee	16	Edward F. Mertz	Dem.	Milwaukee
07	Milwaukee	17	Martin F. Howard	Rep.	Milwaukee
06	Milwaukee	18	Charles J. Schmidt	Dem.	Milwaukee
05	Milwaukee	19	Walter L. Merten	Rep.	Milwaukee
08	Milwaukee	20	John E. Reilly Jr.	Rep.	Wauwatosa
31	Monroe		Earl D. Hall	Rep.	Tomah
02	Oconto		Reuben La Fave	Rep.	Oconto
14	Outagamie	1	Walter Melchior	Rep.	Appleton
14	Outagamie	2	Gerald Lorge	Rep.	Bear Creek
20	Ozaukee		Nicholas J. Bichler	Dem.	Belgium
10	Pierce		Arthur L. Peterson	Rep.	Prescott
29	Polk		Raymond A. Peabody	Rep.	Milltown
23	Portage		John Kostuck	Dem.	Stevens Point
12	Price		Vincent J. Zellinger	Rep.	Phillips
21	Racine	1	Harold Gade	Dem.	Racine
21	Racine	2	Lawrence R. Larsen	Rep.	Racine
21	Racine	3	Robert J. Matheson	Rep.	Mount Pleasant
27	Richland		Milford C. Kintz	Rep.	Richland Center
15	Rock	1	Edward Grassman	Rep.	Edgerton
15	Rock	2	Burger M. Engebretson	Rep.	Beloit
12	Rusk & Sawyer		Paul J. Rogan	Rep.	Ladysmith
27	Sauk		James R. Stone	Rep.	Baraboo
14	Shawano		Robert G. Marotz	Rep.	Shawano
20	Sheboygan	1	Fred E. Nuernberg	Rep.	Sheboygan
20	Sheboygan	2	Henry W. Timmer	Rep.	Waldo
10	St. Croix		William A. Bergeron	Rep.	Somerset
24	Taylor		Millard M. Kapitz	Rep.	Rib Lake
32	Trempealeau		Russell Paulson	Rep.	Strum
16	Vernon		Arthur O. Mockrud	Rep.	Westby
22	Walworth		Ora R. Rice	Rep.	Delavan
13	Washington		Kenneth W. Haebig	Rep.	West Bend
33	Waukesha	1	Alvin J. Redford	Rep.	Waukesha
33	Waukesha	2	Alfred R. Ludvigsen	Rep.	Hartland
23	Waupaca		Richard E. Peterson	Rep.	Clintonville
19	Winnebago	1	Harvey R. Abraham	Rep.	Oshkosh
19	Winnebago	2	Arnold J. Cane	Rep.	Menasha
24	Wood		William W. Clark	Rep.	Vesper

== Committees ==
=== Senate committees ===
- Senate Standing Committee on Agriculture and Conservation – M. Olson, chair
- Senate Standing Committee on Committees – W. P. Knowles, chair
- Senate Standing Committee on Contingent Expenditures – B. Gettelman, chair
- Senate Standing Committee on Education and Public Welfare – R. P. Robinson, chair
- Senate Standing Committee on Highways – J. Miller, chair
- Senate Standing Committee on the Judiciary – G. W. Buchen, chair
- Senate Standing Committee on Labor and Management – G. A. Bubolz, chair
- Senate Standing Committee on Legislative Procedure – F. E. Panzer, chair
- Senate Standing Committee on State and Local Government – R. Schlabach, chair
- Senate Standing Committee on Veterans Affairs – M. Laird, chair

=== Assembly committees ===
- Assembly Standing Committee on Agriculture – J. T. Pritchard, chair
- Assembly Standing Committee on Commerce and Manufacturing – H. W. Brooks, chair
- Assembly Standing Committee on Conservation – R. S. Travis, chair
- Assembly Standing Committee on Contingent Expenditures – E. C. Nitschke, chair
- Assembly Standing Committee on Education – W. W. Clark, chair
- Assembly Standing Committee on Elections – H. W. Timmer, chair
- Assembly Standing Committee on Engrossed Bills – T. S. Jones, chair
- Assembly Standing Committee on Enrolled Bills – R. A. Peabody, chair
- Assembly Standing Committee on Excise and Fees – H. R. Abraham, chair
- Assembly Standing Committee on Highways – H. A. Harper, chair
- Assembly Standing Committee on Insurance and Banking – B. M. Engebretson, chair
- Assembly Standing Committee on the Judiciary – A. O. Mockrud, chair
- Assembly Standing Committee on Labor – E. L. Genzmer, chair
- Assembly Standing Committee on Municipalities – P. A. Luedtke, chair
- Assembly Standing Committee on Printing – C. H. Sykes, chair
- Assembly Standing Committee on Public Welfare – H. Rasmusen, chair
- Assembly Standing Committee on Revision – C. A. Peterson, chair
- Assembly Standing Committee on Rules – B. M. Engebretson, chair
- Assembly Standing Committee on State Affairs – B. J. Gehrmann, chair
- Assembly Standing Committee on Taxation – A. F. Betts, chair
- Assembly Standing Committee on Third Reading – C. E. Nelson, chair
- Assembly Standing Committee on Transportation – R. Bice, chair
- Assembly Standing Committee on Veterans and Military Affairs – R. H. Sengstock, chair

=== Joint committees ===
- Joint Standing Committee on Finance – F. B. Porter (Sen.) & A. R. Ludvigsen (Asm.), co-chairs
- Joint Standing Committee on Revisions, Repeals, and Uniform Laws – A. Busby (Sen.) & E. Grassman (Asm.), co-chairs
- Joint Special Committee on Reapportionment – R. P. Robinson (Sen.), chair

== Employees ==
=== Senate employees ===
- Chief Clerk: Thomas M. Donahue
- Sergeant-at-Arms: Harold Damon
  - Assistant Sergeant-at-Arms: A. J. Oelmiller

=== Assembly employees ===
- Chief Clerk: Arthur L. May
  - Assistant Chief Clerk: Robert H. Boyson
- Sergeant-at-Arms: Norris J. Kellman
  - Assistant Sergeant-at-Arms: Earl J. Dalton
