= Hamburg, Wisconsin =

Hamburg is the name of some places in the U.S. state of Wisconsin:

- Hamburg, Marathon County, Wisconsin
- Hamburg (community), Marathon County, Wisconsin
- Hamburg, Vernon County, Wisconsin
