= Martin Lueck =

Martin Lueck may refer to:

- Martin L. Lueck (1872–1926), American politician and judge
- Martin C. Lueck (1888–1986), American farmer and politician
