= Sengstock =

Sengstock is a surname. Notable people with the surname include:

- Fred W. Sengstock (1898–1963), American baseball player
- Larry Sengstock (born 1960), Australian basketball player
- Roy H. Sengstock (1913–1981), American politician
