= Gibbsville =

Gibbsville may refer to:

- Gibbsville (TV series), a 1976 American dramatic television series
- Gibbsville, Wisconsin, a census-designated place in the town of Lima, Sheboygan County, Wisconsin
