= Somerset (town), Wisconsin =

Town in St. Croix County, Wisconsin

Somerset, Wisconsin
- Town
- Town of Somerset
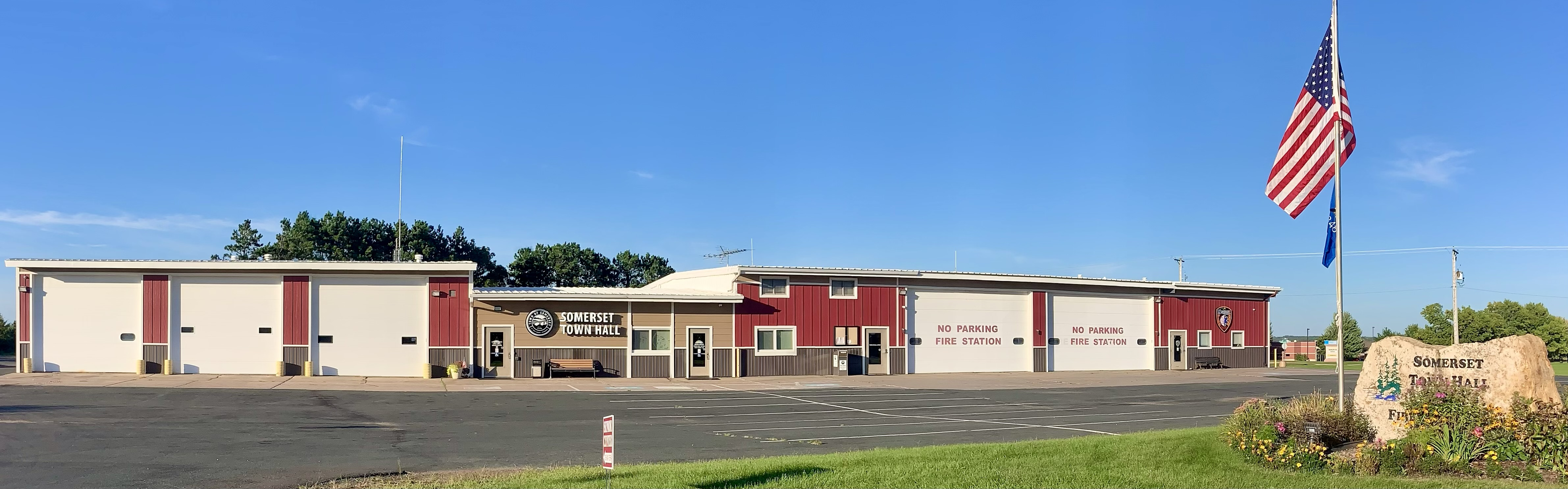
- Somerset Town Hall

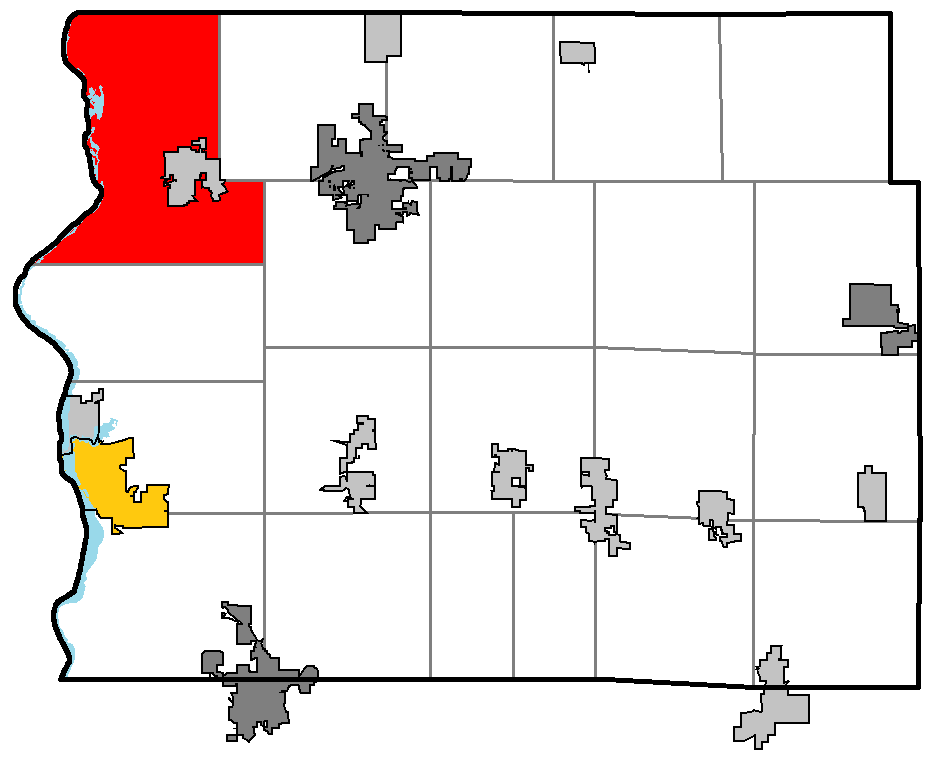
- Location of Somerset, within St. Croix County

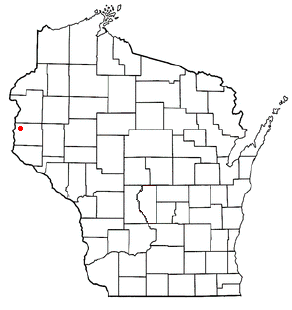
- Location of Somerset, Wisconsin
- Coordinates: 45°08′43″N 92°42′14″W
- Country: United States
- State: Wisconsin
- County: St. Croix

Area
  - Total: 48.03 sq mi (124.4 km^{2})
  - Land: 46.29 sq mi (119.9 km^{2})
  - Water: 1.73 sq mi (4.5 km^{2})

Population (2020)
  - Total: 4,291
  - Density: 92.70/sq mi (35.79/km^{2})
- Time zone: UTC-6 (Central (CST))
  - Summer (DST): UTC-5 (CDT)
- Area code(s): 715 and 534
- GNIS feature ID: 1584175

Somerset is a town in St. Croix County, Wisconsin, United States. The population was 4,291 at the 2020 census. The Village of Somerset is adjacent to the town.

== Geography ==
According to the United States Census Bureau, the town has a total area of 49.9 square miles (129.2 km^{2}), of which 47.9 square miles (124.1 km^{2}) is land and 2.0 square miles (5.2 km^{2}) (4.03%) is water.

== Demographics ==
Historical population
Census	Pop.	Note	%±
2000	2,644		—
2010	4,036		52.6%
2020	4,291		6.3%

As of the census of 2000, there were 2,644 people, 927 households, and 738 families residing in the town. The population density was 55.2 inhabitants per square mile (21.3/km^{2}). There were 963 housing units at an average density of 20.1 per square mile (7.8/km^{2}). The racial makeup of the town was 97.69% White, 0.04% Black or African American, 0.30% Native American, 0.91% Asian, 0.04% Pacific Islander, 0.11% from other races, and 0.91% from two or more races. 0.38% of the population were Hispanic or Latino of any race.

There were 927 households, out of which 39.7% had children under the age of 18 living with them, 68.4% were married couples living together, 6.7% had a female householder with no husband present, and 20.3% were non-families. 15.2% of all households were made up of individuals, and 4.1% had someone living alone who was 65 years of age or older. The average household size was 2.85 and the average family size was 3.18.

In the town, the population was spread out, with 29.0% under the age of 18, 6.2% from 18 to 24, 33.2% from 25 to 44, 24.5% from 45 to 64, and 7.0% who were 65 years of age or older. The median age was 36 years. For every 100 females, there were 109.3 males. For every 100 females age 18 and over, there were 109.6 males.

The median income for a household in the town was $62,063, and the median income for a family was $66,098. Males had a median income of $41,497 versus $31,743 for females. The per capita income for the town was $25,605. About 3.1% of families and 2.9% of the population were below the poverty line, including 5.0% of those under age 18 and 1.4% of those age 65 or over.

== Notable people ==
- William A. Bergeron, Wisconsin State Representative, lived on a farm in the town; Bergeron was chairman of the Somerset Town Board

== See also ==
- List of towns in Wisconsin
