= Michael F. Blenski =

Polish-American politician

Michael Blenski

Member of the Wisconsin State Assembly from the Milwaukee 12th district
- In office January 3, 1893 – January 7, 1895
- Preceded by: Michał Kruszka
- Succeeded by: Andrew H. Boncel

Personal details
- Born: September 27, 1862 Stargardt, Province of Prussia, Kingdom of Prussia
- Died: March 23, 1932 (aged 69) Milwaukee, Wisconsin, U.S.
- Resting place: Saint Adalberts Cemetery, Milwaukee
- Party: Democratic
- Spouses: Florentina Niestatek (m. 1884; died 1896); Jadwiga Rosanowaska
- Children: Florentina Niestatek; Martin F. Blenski^{(b. 1884; died 1943)}; Leo Michael Blenski^{(b. 1888; died 1950)}; Joseph Blenski^{(b. 1890; died 1890)}; with Jadwiga Rosanowaska; Jadwiga Blenski^{(b. 1903; died 1909)}; Tadeusz Blenski^{(b. 1904; died 1909)}; Felicja Seweryna Blenski^{(b. 1906; died 1909)}; Michael Francis Blenski^{(b. 1912; died 2005)}; Roman Richard Blenski^{(b. 1917; died 2002)}
- Occupation: Bookkeeper

Michael F. Blenski (September 27, 1862 – March 23, 1932) was a Polish American immigrant, book-keeper, and Democratic politician. He was a member of the Wisconsin State Assembly, representing the south side of the city of Milwaukee during the 1893 session.

== Early life ==
Blenski was born in Stargardt in what is now Poland. At the time of his birth, this was the Province of Prussia in the Kingdom of Prussia. In 1880, Blenski emigrated to the United States and settled in Milwaukee, Wisconsin.

== Career ==
After settling in the United States, Blenski worked as a bookkeeper. He also worked in the Wisconsin Land Office and the Mendota Hospital for the Insane. From 1881 to 1888, Blenski served in the Wisconsin National Guard. He also served as a judge of the Milwaukee Civil Court.

Blenski was a member of the Wisconsin State Assembly from 1893 to 1894. In 1906, he was a candidate for Lieutenant Governor of Wisconsin, losing to William D. Connor. Additionally, he was a delegate to the 1912 Democratic National Convention, where he was a member of the Committee to Notify Vice-Presidential Nominee. He was one of the first members of the Polish-American community in Milwaukee to serve in elected office.

== Personal life ==
His son, Roman R. Blenski, was a member of the Assembly and of the Wisconsin State Senate. Another son, Michael, Jr., was an unsuccessful candidate for the Assembly in 1938. Blenski died on March 23, 1932, in Milwaukee, Wisconsin in a hospital following surgery.
