= Rodney J. Satter =

American politician

Rodney J. Satter (September 15, 1925 – July 10, 2011) was a former member of the Wisconsin State Assembly.

== Biography ==
Satter was born on September 15, 1925, in Prairie du Chien, Wisconsin. He graduated from the University of Wisconsin-Madison. He then received his law degree from University of Wisconsin Law School. During World War II, he served in the United States Army Air Forces. From 1949 to 1952, Satter was Constable of Prairie du Chien. He served on the Crawford County, Wisconsin Board of Supervisors and as District Attorney for Crawford County. He later served as assistant corporate counsel and district attorney for Monroe County, Wisconsin. He died on June 10, 2011, in Prairie du Chien, Wisconsin.

== Political career ==
Satter was first elected to the Assembly in 1950. He was a Republican. In 1954 he unsuccessfully ran against Jess Miller in the Republican primary for state senator.
