= Robert Watson Landry =

20th century American politician and judge

Robert W. Landry

Wisconsin Circuit Court Judge for the Milwaukee circuit, branch 6
- In office August 1, 1978 – August 1, 1993
- Preceded by: Transitioned from 2nd circ.
- Succeeded by: George W. Greene Jr.

Wisconsin Circuit Court Judge for the 2nd circuit, branch 6
- In office November 24, 1959 – July 31, 1978
- Appointed by: Gaylord Nelson
- Preceded by: Francis X. Swietlik
- Succeeded by: Transitioned to Milwaukee circ.

Member of the Wisconsin State Assembly from the Milwaukee 1st district
- In office January 1, 1951 – June 1954
- Preceded by: Thomas A. Hickey
- Succeeded by: Edward F. Mertz

Personal details
- Born: June 22, 1922 Madison, Wisconsin, U.S.
- Died: November 13, 2017 (aged 95)
- Party: Democratic
- Spouse: Vera Katherine (m. 1951; died 2002)
- Children: 3 sons
- Education: University of Chicago; University of Wisconsin Law School
- Profession: lawyer, judge

Military service
- Allegiance: United States
- Branch/service: United States Navy
- Battles/wars: World War II

Robert Watson Landry (June 22, 1922 – November 13, 2017) was an American lawyer, judge, and Democratic politician. He served two terms in the Wisconsin State Assembly, representing the east side of the city of Milwaukee and went on to serve 35 years as a Wisconsin circuit court judge in Milwaukee County.

== Biography ==
Landry was born in Madison, Wisconsin. He attended school in Atwater, Wisconsin, and Shorewood, Wisconsin, before graduating from the University of Chicago and the University of Wisconsin Law School. During World War II, Landry served in the United States Navy. He died on November 13, 2017, at the age of 95.

== Political career ==
Landry was elected on the Democratic ticket to the Wisconsin State Assembly in 1950, representing Milwaukee County's 1st Assembly district (the 1st and 3rd wards of the city of Milwaukee). He was re-elected in 1952.

During his second term in the Assembly, he ran for and won election to a judgeship on the Milwaukee Civil Court. He served in that role until he was appointed to the Wisconsin circuit court judgeship in November 1959, to replace Francis X. Swietlik, who had resigned. He subsequently served 35 years as a circuit court judge. In 1977 he ran for an open seat on the Wisconsin Supreme Court, but was defeated by William G. Callow.

== Electoral history ==
=== Wisconsin Supreme Court (1977) ===
Wisconsin Supreme Court Election, 1977
Party	Candidate	Votes	%	±%
Nonpartisan Primary, February 15, 1977 (top-two)
Nonpartisan	Robert W. Landry	133,732	45.00%	
Nonpartisan	William G. Callow	102,371	34.45%	
Nonpartisan	Trayton L. Lathrop	61,058	20.55%	
Total votes		297,161	100.0%	
General Election, April 5, 1977
Nonpartisan	William G. Callow	415,533	53.59%	
Nonpartisan	Robert W. Landry	359,873	46.41%	
Plurality		55,660	7.18%	
Total votes		775,406	100.0%	

Wisconsin State Assembly
Preceded by Thomas A. Hickey	Member of the Wisconsin State Assembly from the Milwaukee 1st district January 1, 1951 – June 1954	Succeeded by Edward F. Mertz
Legal offices
Preceded by Francis X. Swietlik	Wisconsin Circuit Court Judge for the 2nd circuit, branch 6 November 24, 1959 – July 31, 1978	Circuit abolished
Circuit established	Wisconsin Circuit Court Judge for the Milwaukee circuit, branch 6 August 1, 1978 – August 1, 1993	Succeeded by George W. Greene Jr.
