= Ben Tremain =

American politician

Member of the Wisconsin Assembly
- In office January 7, 1957 – January 2, 1961
- Preceded by: Louis C. Romell
- Succeeded by: Louis C. Romell
- Constituency: Adams-Juneau-Marquette district
- In office January 6, 1947 – January 3, 1955
- Preceded by: Pat W. Brunner
- Succeeded by: District abolished
- Constituency: Juneau County district
- In office January 5, 1931 – January 2, 1933
- Preceded by: Orland Steen Loomis
- Succeeded by: John P. Conway
- Constituency: Juneau County district

Personal details
- Born: February 25, 1888 Monroe County, Wisconsin
- Died: January 1971 (aged 82)
- Party: Republican
- Occupation: Merchant, farmer

Ben Tremain (February 25, 1888 - January 1971) was a member of the Wisconsin State Assembly.

== Biography ==
Tremain was born on February 25, 1888, in Monroe County, Wisconsin. He would become a merchant and a farmer. He died in January 1971.

== Political career ==
Tremain was a member of the Assembly from three times. First, from 1931 to 1933, second, from 1947 to 1955 and third, from 1957 to 1961. Previously, he had been President of Hustler, Wisconsin, where he was also a member of the school board and a member of the Juneau County, Wisconsin Board. He was a Republican.
