= Hermann Eisner =

American politician (1898–1969)

Member of the Wisconsin State Assembly from the Dane 3rd district
- In office January 3, 1949 – January 5, 1953
- Preceded by: Rudy W. Roethlisberger
- Succeeded by: Ervin M. Bruner

Personal details
- Born: December 29, 1898 Upper Austria, Austria-Hungary
- Died: September 18, 1969 (aged 70) Cross Plains, Wisconsin, U.S.
- Resting place: Saint Francis Xavier Cemetery, Cross Plains
- Party: Republican; Democratic (until 1951)
- Spouse: Theresa Maier
- Children: 3

Hermann Eisner (December 29, 1898 – September 18, 1969) was an Austrian American immigrant, farmer, and politician from Cross Plains, Wisconsin. He served two terms in the Wisconsin State Assembly, representing western Dane County from 1949 to 1953; he was elected to both terms as a member of the Democratic Party, but became a Republican in 1951 after the adjournment of the 70th Wisconsin Legislature. He also served as chairman of the town board of Cross Plains.

== Biography ==
Eisner was a member of the Wisconsin State Assembly from 1949 to 1953. He was an unsuccessful candidate for the Wisconsin State Senate in 1956 and in the Republican primary for the Assembly in 1958. Eisner was born on December 29, 1898, in Austria.

Wisconsin State Assembly
Preceded by Rudy W. Roethlisberger	Member of the Wisconsin State Assembly from the Dane 3rd district January 3, 1949 – January 5, 1953	Succeeded by Ervin M. Bruner
