= Roman R. Blenski =

20th century American politician

Roman Blenski

Member of the Wisconsin Senate from the 7th district
- In office April 18, 1949 – January 3, 1955
- Preceded by: Anthony P. Gawronski
- Succeeded by: Leland McParland

Member of the Wisconsin State Assembly from the Milwaukee 17th district
- In office January 1, 1945 – January 6, 1947
- Preceded by: William F. Double
- Succeeded by: Martin F. Howard

Personal details
- Born: January 24, 1917 Milwaukee, Wisconsin, U.S.
- Died: August 30, 2002 (aged 85) Milwaukee, Wisconsin, U.S.
- Resting place: Saint Adalberts Cemetery, Milwaukee
- Party: Republican (2000); Independent (1974); Democratic (1940s–1950s)
- Parent: Michael F. Blenski (father)
- Education: Spencerian Business College

Roman R. Blenski (January 24, 1917 – August 30, 2002) was an American politician and perennial candidate from Wisconsin. He was a member of the Wisconsin State Senate and Assembly, representing Milwaukee County during the 1940s and 1950s.

== Early life and education ==
Roman Richard Blenski was born on January 24, 1917, in Milwaukee, Wisconsin, son of Michael Francis and Hattie Jadwiga (Rozanowski) Blenski. He went to St. John's Military Academy and then graduated from Bayview High School in 1936. Blenski's father, Michael F. Blenski Sr., had been a member of the Wisconsin State Assembly. Roman also went to Spencerian Business College and worked as an inspector in a machine shop.

== Career ==
In 1938, Blenski was an unsuccessful candidate for a seat in the Wisconsin State Assembly's 17th Milwaukee County district as a Democrat (his brother Michael Jr. was also a candidate for the 14th district, and also lost). He was elected to the same Assembly seat in 1944, serving from 1945 to 1946. In 1946, he failed to win the Democratic nomination for the 7th State Senate District. In 1948 he failed by 29 votes to reclaim his old Assembly seat, but in an August 1949 special election (to fill the vacancy caused by the resignation of Anthony P. Gawronski, to whom he'd lost the nomination in 1946) won the 7th District Senate seat. From 1949 to 1954 he served in the Wisconsin State Senate. In 1954 he was an unsuccessful candidate for Wisconsin Circuit Court Judge. He was also later an unsuccessful candidate for the United States Senate from Wisconsin in 1974 as an independent, losing to incumbent Gaylord Nelson. He ran in the Republican primary for Wisconsin's 4th congressional district in 2000, losing to Tim Riener. Riener lost to incumbent Jerry Kleczka in the general election.

Blenski continued to run for office at varying levels and under various party labels for the rest of his life. At the time of his death, he was on the upcoming primary election ballot for the State Senate Democratic nomination won by Tim Carpenter.

== Personal life ==
He was a member of the Fraternal Order of Eagles and the Polish National Alliance. Blenski died on August 30, 2002.
