= Millard M. Kapitz =

American politician (1906–1978)

Millard Milo Kapitz (July 31, 1906 in Rib Lake, Wisconsin – December 29, 1978) was a member of the Wisconsin State Assembly. During World War II, he served in the United States Navy.

== Political career ==
Kapitz was elected to the Assembly in 1950. Additionally, he was a member of the Taylor County, Wisconsin Board, serving as Vice Chairman from 1941 to 1943 and Chairman from 1947 to 1950. He was a Republican.
