= Rudy W. Roethlisberger =

American politician and farmer (1894–1957)

Rudy W. Roethlisberger (April 9, 1894 – January 16, 1957) was an American politician and farmer.

Born in Wellman, Iowa, Roethlisberger went to school in Tennessee. He moved to Wisconsin at age 16 and married Minnie Massey (1893–1961). He was a farmer in the Town of Verona, Dane County, Wisconsin. Roethlisberger served on the Dane County Board of Supervisors, was chairman of the Verona Town Board, and served on the school board. Roethlisberger served in the Wisconsin State Assembly from 1945 to 1949 and was a Republican. He died in a hospital in Madison, Wisconsin.
