= Alex L. Nicol =

American politician

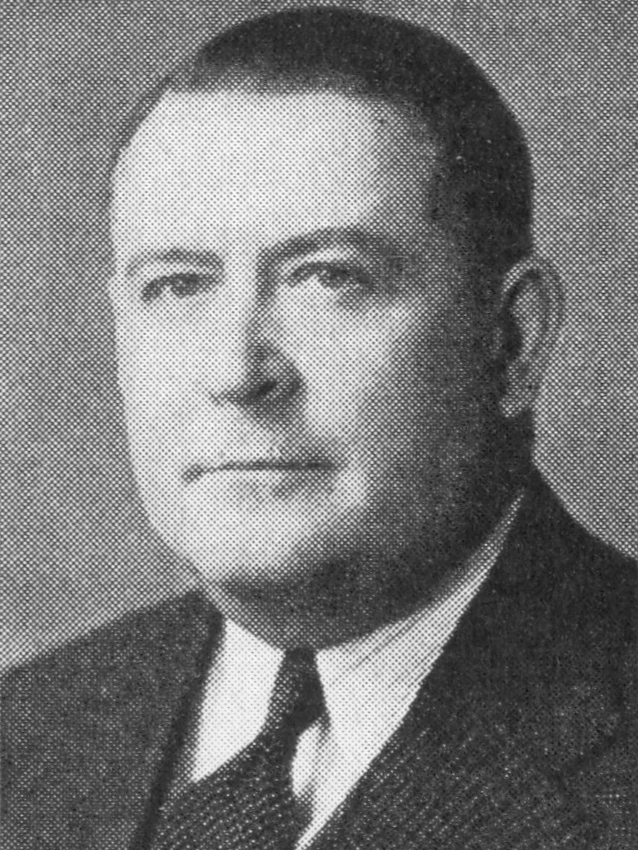
Nicol circa 1940

Alexander Lee Nicol (March 13, 1895 – July 22, 1967) was an American political figure on the state level who served as Speaker of the Wisconsin State Assembly during its 1949–50 session.

Born in the small Wisconsin city of Sparta, he served as an officer in the United States Army during World War I and was awarded the Distinguished Service Cross.

As a member of Robert M. La Follette's Progressive Party, he was clerk of Monroe County from 1921 to 1939 and, after joining the Republican Party, a member of the Assembly from 1939 to 1950.

Alex Nicol died in his hometown of Sparta at the age of 72.
