= Gibbsville, Wisconsin =

Census-designated place in Wisconsin, United States

- Unincorporated community Census designated place
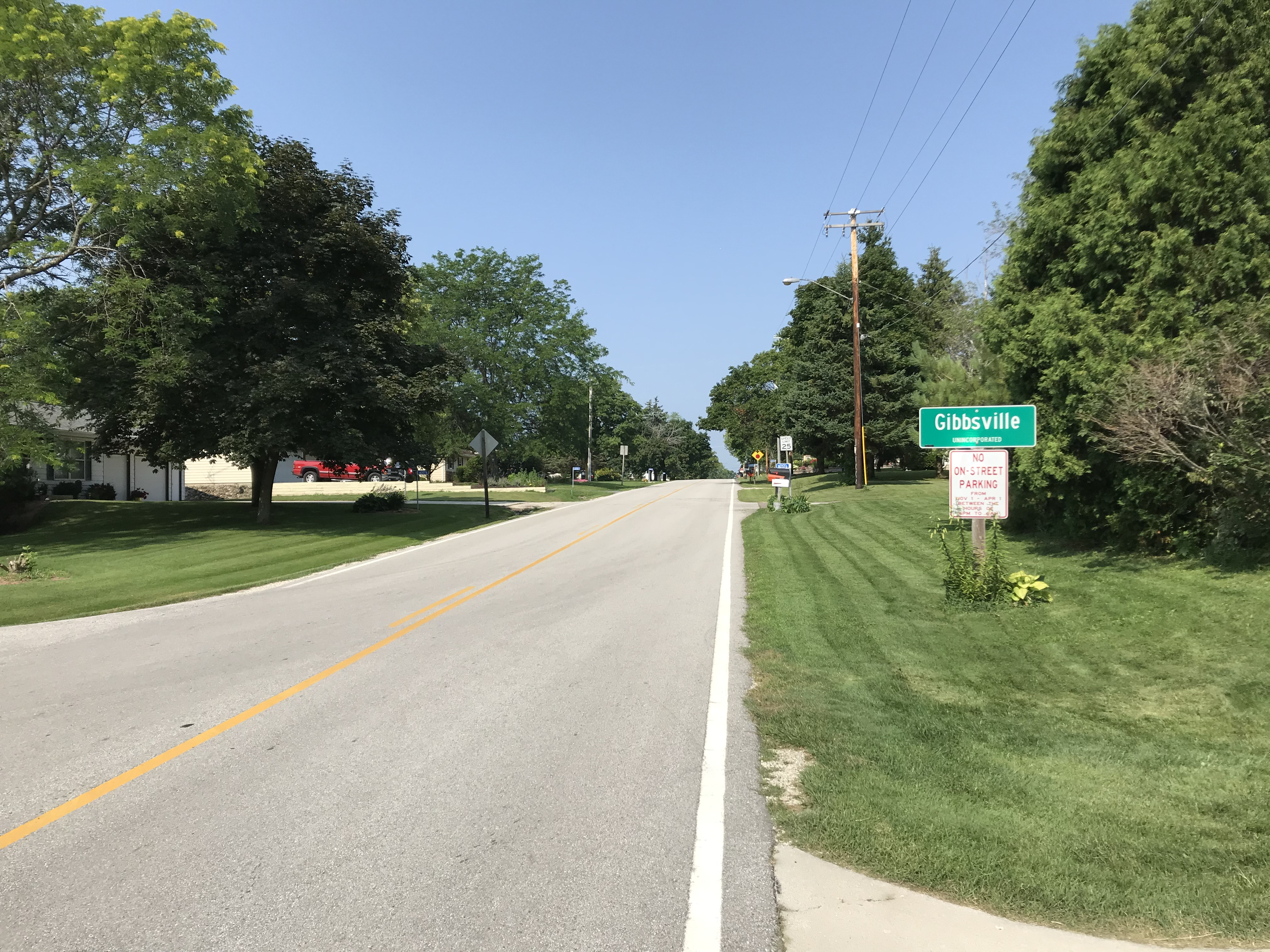
- Looking west at Gibbsville

- Location within Wisconsin
- Coordinates: 43°39′08″N 87°49′36″W
- Country: United States
- State: Wisconsin
- County: Sheboygan

Area
  - Total: 0.857 sq mi (2.22 km^{2})
  - Land: 0.853 sq mi (2.21 km^{2})
  - Water: 0.004 sq mi (0.010 km^{2})
- Elevation: 728 ft (222 m)

Population (2020)
  - Total: 486
  - Density: 570/sq mi (220/km^{2})
- Time zone: UTC-6 (Central (CST))
  - Summer (DST): UTC-5 (CDT)
- Area code: 920
- GNIS feature ID: 1565504

Gibbsville is an Unincorporated community and census-designated place (CDP) in the town of Lima, Sheboygan County, Wisconsin, United States. Gibbsville is located on Wisconsin Highway 32, 2.5 miles (4.0 km) northwest of Oostburg. As of the 2020 census, Gibbsville had a population of 486.

== History ==
James, John and Benjamin Gibbs settled Gibbsville in 1836. A post office was in operation from 1846 to 1907, and a school was in operation from 1900 to 1977.

== Notable people ==
- Henry W. Timmer, Wisconsin State Assemblyman and businessman, was born in Gibbsville.
