= John D. Heimick =

American politician

John D. Heimick (December 10, 1899 – July 23, 1949) was a member of the Wisconsin State Assembly.

== Early life ==
Heimick was born in Milwaukee, Wisconsin.

== Career ==
Heimick was elected to the Assembly in 1942 and remained a member until his death. He was a Republican.
