= Albert Hammond (Wisconsin politician) =

American businessman and politician

Albert Hammond, Sr. (January 30, 1883 – July 15, 1968) was an American businessman and politician.

Born in Detroit, Michigan, Hammond moved with his parents to Milwaukee, Wisconsin. He went to parochial and public schools. From 1911 to 1921, Hammond worked for the Chicago and Northwestern Railway as a brakeman. He then worked as a painting contractor and was involved with the local painters labor union. Hammond served in the Wisconsin State Assembly in 1949 and was a Democrat. He died of a heart attack at his home in Milwaukee, Wisconsin.
