= Ralph Landowski =

American politician

Ralph John Landowski (March 23, 1912 – 1968) was a plumber from Milwaukee, Wisconsin who spent four terms as a Democratic member of the Wisconsin State Assembly from Milwaukee.

== Background ==
Landowski was born in Milwaukee on March 23, 1912. He graduated from St. Casimir's Parochial School and Metropolitan Business College. He became a plumber, and a member of St. Casimir's Civic and Athletic Association, of the American Federation of Labor, and of his local Democratic Club.

== Elective office ==
Landowski had not held any public office until his election to the Assembly's 13th Milwaukee County district (the 13th & 21st Wards of the city of Milwaukee) in 1948 to succeed fellow Democrat William Nawrocki, who was not a candidate for re-election. After getting an absolute majority in a four-way primary election race, he won in the general election with 10,912 votes to 6071 for Republican John Froemming and 250 for People's Progressive Leo Jacobs. He was assigned to the standing committee on transportation. After an easy victory in the 1950 primary, he again defeated Froemming in the general election. He remained on the transportation committee, and was also assigned to the committee on commerce and manufacturers. He was an unsuccessful candidate in 1952's spring election for the Milwaukee County board of supervisors.

After winning his 1952 primary for the Assembly, he defeated Froemming for a third time. He remained on Commerce and Manufacturers, but switched from the transportation committee to that on veterans and military affairs; and was also assigned to a special committee on higher education. After a redistricting, he ran in what was now the 18th Milwaukee County Assembly district (the 18th Ward of the city Milwaukee) in 1954; while he had no challenger in the primary, he won by only 6607 votes to 6203 for Republican Phillip Gross, Jr. In the Assembly he returned to the transportation committee, but switched to the standing committee on excise and fees, and served on another special committee (this one on state government operations).

He was elected alderman for Milwaukee's 18th ward in April 1956 (winning by 58 votes) He did not run for re-election to the Assembly, and was succeeded there by Republican John Meyer. In 1960 Landowski sought re-election to the Milwaukee Common Council, but was ousted by insurance agent Allen Calhoun, who won by almost 1400 votes. He attempted a return to the City Council in 1964, but was again defeated.
