= John Kostuck =

American politician

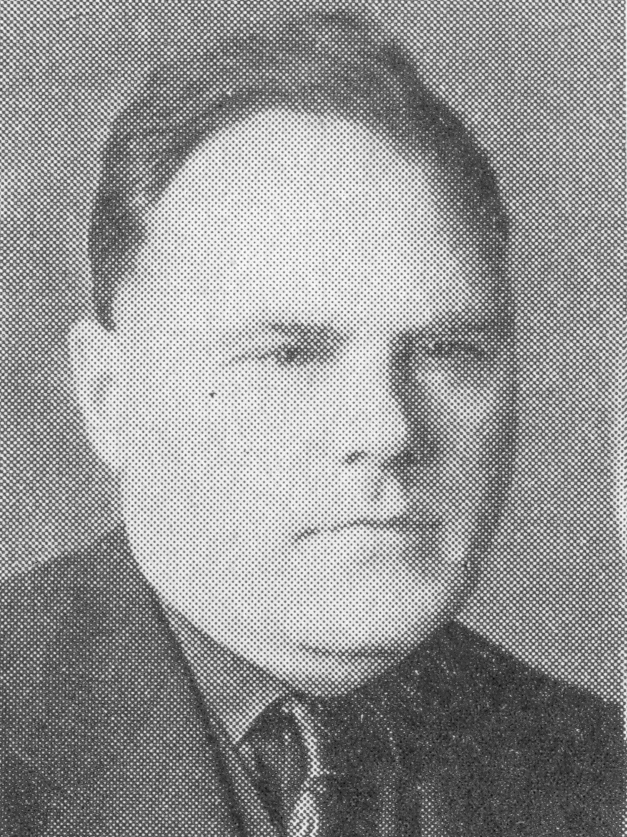
Kostuck circa 1940

John T. Kostuck (October 7, 1892 – August 2, 1960) was an American salesman, piano tuner, and legislator.

Born in Stevens Point, Wisconsin, Kostuck was blinded at age fourteen in a blasting accident while working on a farm. Kostuck went to the Wisconsin School for the Blind for his high school education. Kostuck then went to University of Wisconsin–Madison and then taught high school at the Virginia School for the Deaf and the Blind in Staunton, Virginia. He then became a salesman and piano tuner in Stevens Point.

== Political life ==
Kostuck ran in the 1926 Republican primary election for Wisconsin's 8th congressional district against incumbent Edward E. Browne, in a district so Republican that neither the Democrat nor the Socialist had the right to appear on the general election ballot; he came in a distant third in a three-way race. He tried again in 1928, receiving 22.3% of the vote in a head-to-head contest with Browne.

In 1930 he chose instead to run for the Republican nomination for the Portage County seat in the Wisconsin State Assembly as a progressive. He won his party's nomination, and unseated Democratic incumbent Michael Mersch, becoming the first blind member of Wisconsin's legislature. He would be re-elected fourteen times to that seat, the first time (1930) as a Republican, the next four times (1934-1940) as a member of the newly created Wisconsin Progressive Party. In 1942, he switched his affiliation to the Democratic Party, and ran unopposed in both the primary and general elections, as he would in every subsequent election through 1958. He died in Stevens Point in 1960 while still in office and was succeeded by fellow Democrat Norman Myhra (himself disabled; he had lost both hands in combat during World War II)
