= Foster B. Porter =

American politician

Foster B. Porter (August 22, 1891 – September 11, 1965) was a member of the Wisconsin State Senate.

== Biography ==
Porter was born on August 22, 1891, in Barnum, Wisconsin. During World War I, he served as a private in the 299th Aero Squadron in the United States Army. In March 1919 he started a mercantile business in Bloomington, Wisconsin, which he ran until his retirement in 1956. He served on numerous boards and was the Wisconsin representative on the Mississippi River Parkway Commission. He died on September 11, 1965, in Milwaukee, Wisconsin, while attending a meeting of the Commission and is buried in the Bloomington, Wisconsin Cemetery. (Source - Family knowledge.) He died at his home in Bloomington, Wisconsin, in 1965.

== Political career ==
Porter represented the 16th district in the Senate. While in the Senate, he served as Senate Chairman of the Joint Finance Committee during three sessions. In the interims between sessions he had charge of important and influential study projects on education, problems of the aged, industrial development and state and local sharing of institutional costs. He introduced the first bill that had ever been introduced for the improvement of State Parks. Once the bill was signed into law he assured that a portion of the funds went to Wyalusing State Park. He retired from the Senate after 12 years in 1956, when reapportionment put him in a district with another Senator. Additionally, he was president of the Village of Bloomington and a member of the Grant County, Wisconsin Board, as well as a delegate to the 1948 Republican National Convention. He was a candidate for the Republican nomination to the U.S. House of Representatives in 1950.

== Legacy ==
Porter B. Foster Hall, a dormitory at the University of Wisconsin–Platteville, was named after Foster B. Porter.
