= Ervin J. Ryczek =

American politician and funeral director

Ervin John Ryczek (September 20, 1909 – March 18, 2006) was an American politician and funeral director.

Born in Milwaukee, Wisconsin, Ryczek graduated from Marquette University High School and then went to Spencerian Business College. He was an assistant funeral director and a member of the Catholic Order of Foresters and the Society of the Holy Name. From 1941 to 1959, Ryczek served in the Wisconsin State Assembly and was a Democrat.
