= Burger M. Engebretson =

American politician

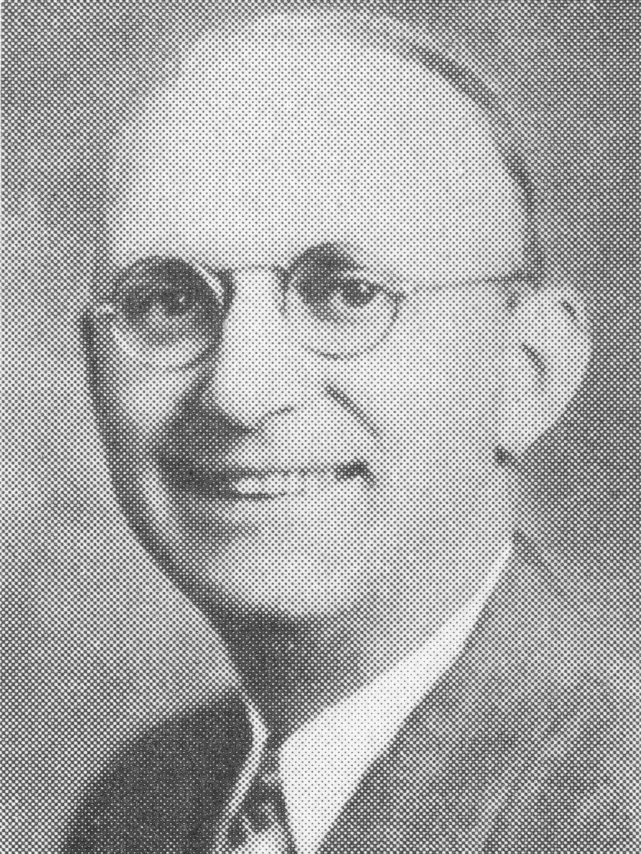
Engebretson circa 1940

Burger M. Engebretson (June 21, 1896 - 18 January 1981) was a member of the Wisconsin State Assembly.

== Biography ==
Burger M. Engebretson was born in Oslo, Norway. He served in the United States Army during World War I. He later attended the University of Wisconsin-Madison. He was engaged in the insurance and real estate business in Beloit, Wisconsin. He died in 1981 at age 84. He was buried at Eastlawn Cemetery in Beloit, Wisconsin.

== Political career ==
Engebretson served two terms in the Rock County, Wisconsin Board of Supervisors. Engebretson served as a Republican Representative in the Wisconsin State Assembly. He represented Rock County's 2nd District from 1937-54.
