= John A. Norman =

American politician

John A. "Pop" Norman (May 29, 1883 – April 6, 1956) was a member of the Wisconsin State Assembly.

== Biography ==
Norman was born in Hartford, Wisconsin. He graduated from the University of Wisconsin-Madison in 1907. Norman married Emma Laughran in 1911. His nickname "Pop" derived from his teaching career: he taught at schools in New York, Washington, California, and Wisconsin, including 21 years as a physics teacher at Lincoln High School in Manitowoc before becoming an assemblyman.

== Career ==
Norman was first elected to the Assembly in 1948. He was a Republican.
