= Le Roy Simmons =

American politician

Le Roy J. Simmons (also spelled LeRoy and Leroy) was a Democratic member of the Wisconsin State Assembly from 1945 to 1952. Simmons was the second African American to become a member of the Assembly, after Lucian H. Palmer, but the first to preside over it. He was born on July 25, 1905, in Milwaukee, Wisconsin. Simmons was a salesman. He died on May 8, 1973.

== See also ==
- List of African-American officeholders (1900–1959)
