= Byron C. Ostby =

American politician

Member of the Wisconsin State Assembly from the Douglas County 1st district
- In office 1949–1951

Personal details
- Born: August 17, 1924 Superior, Wisconsin, US
- Died: April 28, 2003 (aged 78) Madison, Wisconsin, US
- Party: Republican
- Education: University of Wisconsin–Madison (BS, J.D.)
- Occupation: Lawyer

Military service
- Allegiance: United States
- Branch/service: Navy
- Years of service: 1943–1946
- Battles/wars: World War II

Byron C. Ostby (August 17, 1924 – April 28, 2003) was elected a member of the Wisconsin State Assembly at the age of 24, while still in law school.

== Biography ==
Ostby was born on August 17, 1924, in Superior, Wisconsin, son of Brynjulf Ostby and Ingeborg C. (Lerann) Ostby. During World War II, he served with the United States Navy. Ostby then received his bachelor and law degrees from University of Wisconsin–Madison and then practiced law. He served as honorary consul for Norway and was executive of the Wisconsin Railroad Association. As Honorary Consul to Norway, he was knighted by the king of Norway for his service. His parents (Brynjulf and Ingeborg) were also knighted by King Haakon.

Ostby married Helen Wear on September 8, 1951, and had three children, Helen Signe Ostby, David Joel Ostby, and Laurie Ostby Kehler. He died in Madison, Wisconsin in 2003.

== Political career ==
Ostby, a Republican, was a member of the Wisconsin State Assembly from Douglas County 1st District from 1949 to 1951.
