= Holger Rasmusen =

American politician and pharmacist (1894–1983)

Holger Rasmusen (April 26, 1894 – November 2, 1983) was an American politician and pharmacist.

Born in Superior, Wisconsin, Rasmusen served in the United States Navy during World War I and received his doctorate from Drake University. Rasmusen was a pharmacist in Spooner, Wisconsin and served as mayor from 1942 to 1948. He then served in the Wisconsin State Assembly from 1949 to 1953 as a Republican. Rasmusen finally served in the Wisconsin State Senate from 1957 to 1972. He died in Spooner, Wisconsin.
