= William A. Bergeron =

American farmer, businessman, and politician

William A. Bergeron (July 3, 1898 – February 17, 1970) was an American farmer, businessman, and politician.

Born in Stillwater, Minnesota, Bergeron was a farmer in the town of Somerset, St. Croix County, Wisconsin. He was the chairman of the board of the Mutual Service Insurance Companies. He was also involved in the insurance business and with cooperatives. Bergeron served as chairman of the Somerset Town Board. He also served on the St. Croix County Board of Supervisors and was the chairman of the county board. Bergeron served in the Wisconsin State Assembly during the 1949, 1951, 1953, and 1955 sessions and was a Republican. Bergeron died in Somerset, Wisconsin after a long illness.
