= Arthur O. Mockrud =

American lawyer and politician

Arthur O. Mockrud (August 23, 1912 – April 29, 1982) was an American lawyer and politician.

Mockrud was born in Westby, Wisconsin. He went to the Westby public schools. Mockrud received his bachelor's degree from the University of Wisconsin and his law degree from the University of Wisconsin Law School. He practiced law in Westby and served as the city attorney for Westby. Mockrud served in the Wisconsin Assembly from 1947 to 1955 and was a Republican.
