= Alfred R. Ludvigsen =

American politician

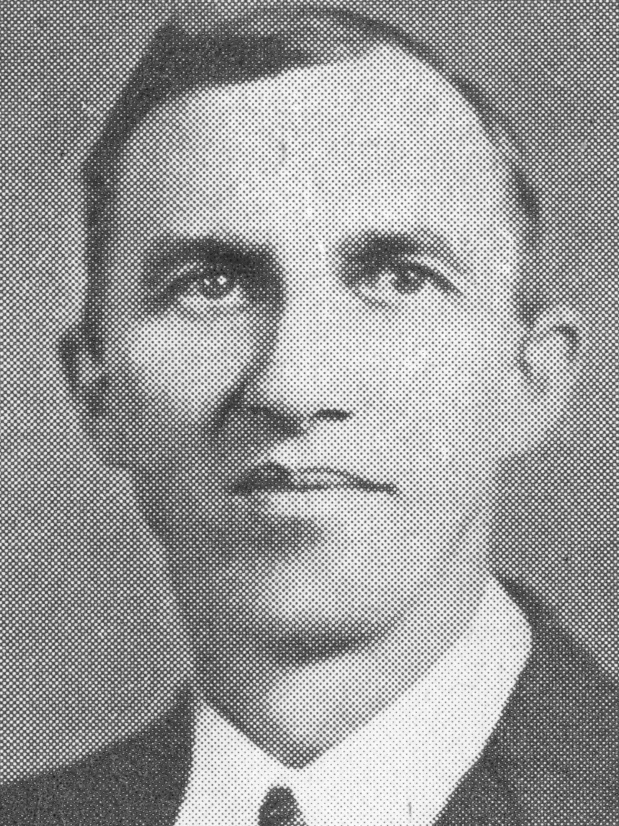
Ludvigsen circa 1940

Alfred R. Ludvigsen (March 17, 1886 – June 10, 1968) from Hartland, Wisconsin, was a member of the Wisconsin State Assembly.

== Biography ==
Ludvigsen was born on March 17, 1886, in Merton, Wisconsin. He went to the public schools and to Luther College in Racine, Wisconsin. Ludgivsen was in the farming and landscaping business. He was also involved in the sale and development of lake frontage. He died on June 10, 1968, in the Waukesha County Home Infirmary and is buried in Hartland, Wisconsin.

== Career ==
Ludvigsen served on the Waukesha County Board and as chairman of the Town of Merton from 1923 to 1928. Ludvigsen also served on the Waukesha County Farm Drainage Board. He served member in the Assembly from 1935 to 1956 and was a Republican.
