= Harry W. Schilling =

American farmer and politician

Harry W. Schilling (September 21, 1887 – March 20, 1958) was an American farmer and politician.

Born in Onalaska, Wisconsin, Schilling went to the Onalaska public schools and took the short agriculture course at the University of Wisconsin–Madison and was a farmer. He served on the creamery board, on the town board, the La Crosse County, Wisconsin Board of Supervisors, and as director of the Midway District School Board. Schilling served in the Wisconsin State Assembly in 1935, 1937, 1947, 1949, 1951 as a Progressive and a Republican. He also ran for the Wisconsin State Senate on the Wisconsin Progressive Party ticket and lost the election.
