= Theodore S. Jones =

American politician

Theodore S. Jones (January 27, 1919 – December 15, 1976) was a member of the Wisconsin State Assembly.

== Biography ==
Jones was born on January 27, 1919, in Lake Mills, Wisconsin. He attended Carroll University before going on to work for the New York Life Insurance Company. Later, he served in the United States Marine Corps during World War II and became chairman of the Wisconsin chapter of the United Service Organizations. He died of a heart attack on December 15, 1976, in Lake Mills, Wisconsin.

== Political career ==
Jones was first elected to the Assembly in 1946 as a Republican. In 1958, he was an unsuccessful candidate as a Democrat.
