= John Schaller =

American politician

John Schaller (July 7, 1912 – 1978) was an American politician. He was a member of the Wisconsin State Assembly.

== Biography ==
Schaller was born on July 7, 1912, in Augsburg, Germany. He moved to Milwaukee, Wisconsin, in 1913. He died in 1978. He was a member of the International Association of Machinists, the Fathers and Brothers Marine Club, and the St. Boniface Holy Name Society.

== Career ==
Schaller was elected to the Assembly in 1948 as a Democrat.
