= Charles A. Peterson =

American politician (1884–1953)

Charles A. Peterson (April 12, 1884 – August 14, 1953) was a member of the Wisconsin State Assembly.

Peterson was born in Harris, Minnesota. He was elected as a Republican in 1948. Peterson went to the agricultural college at University of Wisconsin and was a farmer. He served as town chairman and also, on the Fond du Lac County, Wisconsin Board of Supervisors. He died while still in office. He lived in Rosendale, Wisconsin.
