= William Banach =

American politician

William Philip Banach (1903–1951) was a member of the Wisconsin State Assembly.

== Biography ==
William Banach was born on March 30, 1903, in Milwaukee, Wisconsin. He went to South Division High School. He was Roman Catholic and was a member of the Knights of Columbus. Banach was a draftsman, insurance agent, and owned a tavern. He served on the Milwaukee Common Council. Banach died on March 24, 1951.

== Career ==
Banach was a member of the Assembly from 1947 to 1951. He was a Democrat.
