= Harry A. Keegan =

American politician

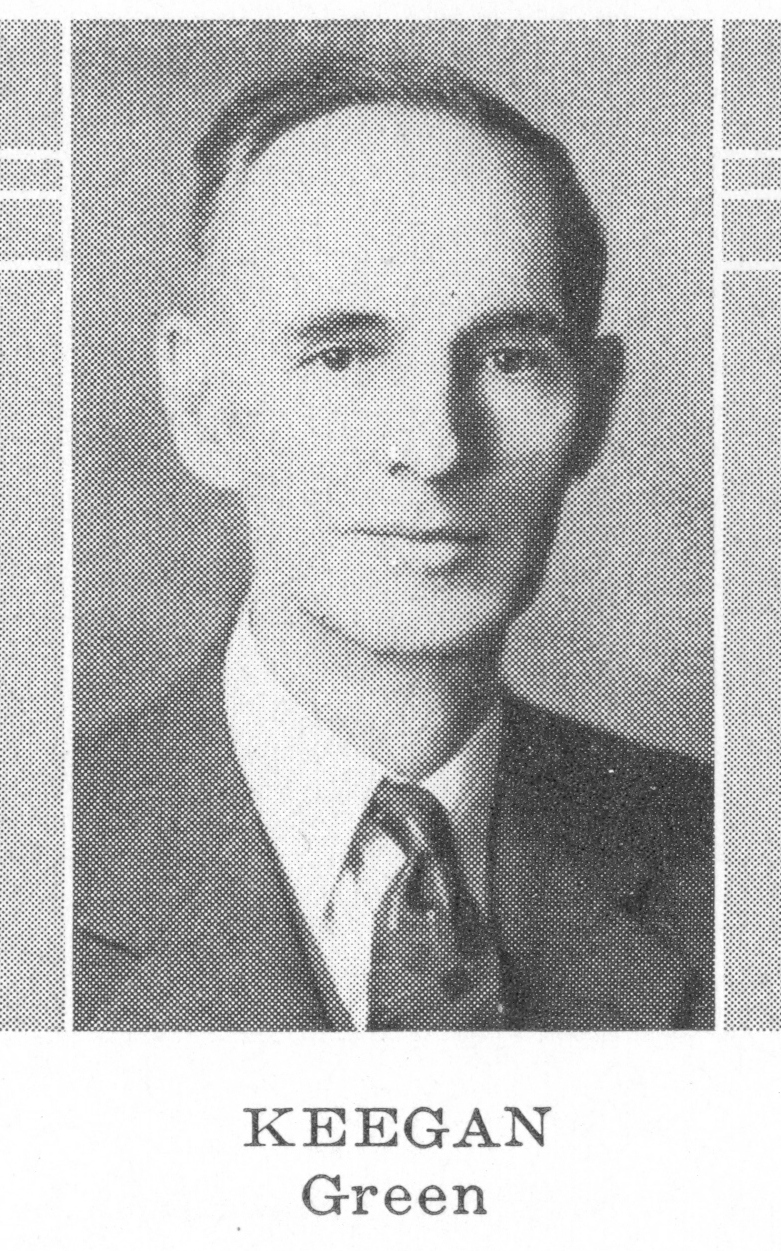
Harry A. Keegan

Harry Albert Keegan (November 18, 1882 – August 25, 1968) was a member of the Wisconsin State Assembly.

== Biography ==
Keegan was born on November 18, 1882, in what is now Madison, South Dakota. He later moved to Monroe, Wisconsin. Keegan died in August 1968.

== Career ==
Keegan was a member of the Assembly twice. First, from 1939 to 1946 and second, from 1949 to 1956. He was a Republican. He was a dairy farmer and also worked in the grocery business. Keegan served on the Monroe Common Council.
