= Raymond A. Peabody =

American businessman and politician

Raymond A. Peabody (February 24, 1883 – April 5, 1973) was an American businessman and politician.

Born in Baldwin, St. Croix County, Wisconsin, he worked as a telegraph operator for the railroad while a teenager. In 1902, Peabody helped start a mercantile and lumber business in Washburn County, Wisconsin. In 1922, Peabody was involved in the insurance, finance, and banking business. Peabody served as president and village trustee of the village of Milltown, Polk County, Wisconsin. He also served on the Polk County Board of Supervisors and was chairman of the county board. From 1943 until 1957, Peabody served in the Wisconsin State Assembly and was a Republican. Peabody died in a hospital in Amery, Wisconsin.
