= Philip Downing =

American politician

- Born: September 3, 1871; Fenaghvale, Ontario, Canada
- Died: January 17, 1961 (aged 89)

Philip Downing (September 3, 1871 – January 17, 1961) was a member of the Wisconsin State Senate.

== Biography ==
Downing was born on September 3, 1871, in Fenaghvale, Ontario, Canada and was a schoolteacher in Amberg, Wisconsin, for ten years and then became postmaster. He later moved to Madison, Wisconsin.

== Career ==
Downing was elected to the Senate in 1940 and was re-elected in 1944, 1948 and 1952. He was a Republican.
