= Clarence W. Gilley =

American politician

Clarence W. Gilley was a member of the Wisconsin State Assembly.

== Biography ==
Gilley was born Clarence William Gilley on May 11, 1919, in Rhinelander, Wisconsin. During World War II, he served in the United States Army. He died in December 1982.

== Political career ==
Gilley was a member of the Assembly from 1949 to 1954. He was a Republican.
