= Ora R. Rice =

American politician

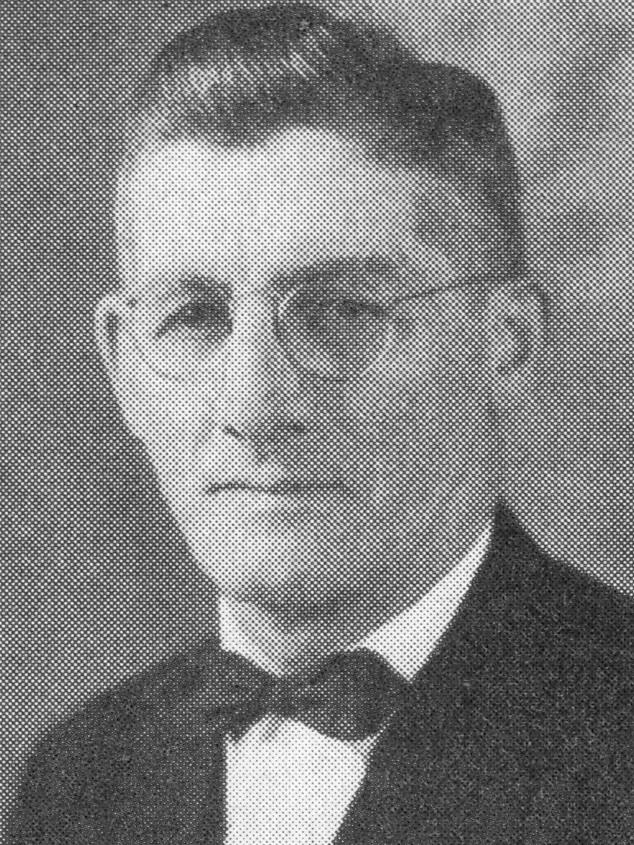
Rice circa 1940

Ora Ray Rice (September 16, 1885 – July 3, 1966) was a Wisconsin state legislator, serving as Speaker of the Wisconsin State Assembly from 1951 to 1954.

== Biography ==
Ora Ray Rice was born on September 16, 1885, in Boscobel, Wisconsin, to Moors Myrick Rice and Emma Jane (Ricks) Rice. He graduated from Northwestern University Dental School and became a practicing dentist. Rice was a direct descendant of Edmund Rice, an early immigrant to Massachusetts Bay Colony. Rice married his first wife, Mary Amelia Tuffley, daughter of George Tuffley Jr. and Amelia Heron, on July 5, 1907, at Boscobel, Wisconsin and he married his second wife, Laura Kuhnau, on November 9, 1957. Ora Ray Rice died on July 3, 1966, at Delavan, Wisconsin, and was interred at Spring Grove Cemetery at Delavan.

== Political career ==
Rice was an alderman of Delavan, Wisconsin from 1916 to 1917 and later served as Mayor of Delavan from 1918 to 1922. He was a member of the Assembly from 1937 to 1960, serving as Speaker from 1951 to 1954. Rice was a Republican.
