= Arnie F. Betts =

American newspaper editor and politician

Arnie F. Betts (January 7, 1909 – September 17, 1993) was an American newspaper editor and politician.

Born in Waterloo, Wisconsin, Betts received his bachelor's degree from University of Wisconsin. He served as secretary to Wisconsin Lieutenant Governor Walter Goodland and was a farmer living in Lodi, Wisconsin. He was editor, publisher, and owner of the newspaper the Lodi Enterprise. Before that, he edited the Waterloo Courier and the Columbus Journal-Republican. Betts served in the Wisconsin State Assembly from 1942 to 1952 as a Republican.

Betts retired in Wilmette, Illinois and died in Evanston, Illinois.
