= John T. Pritchard =

American politician

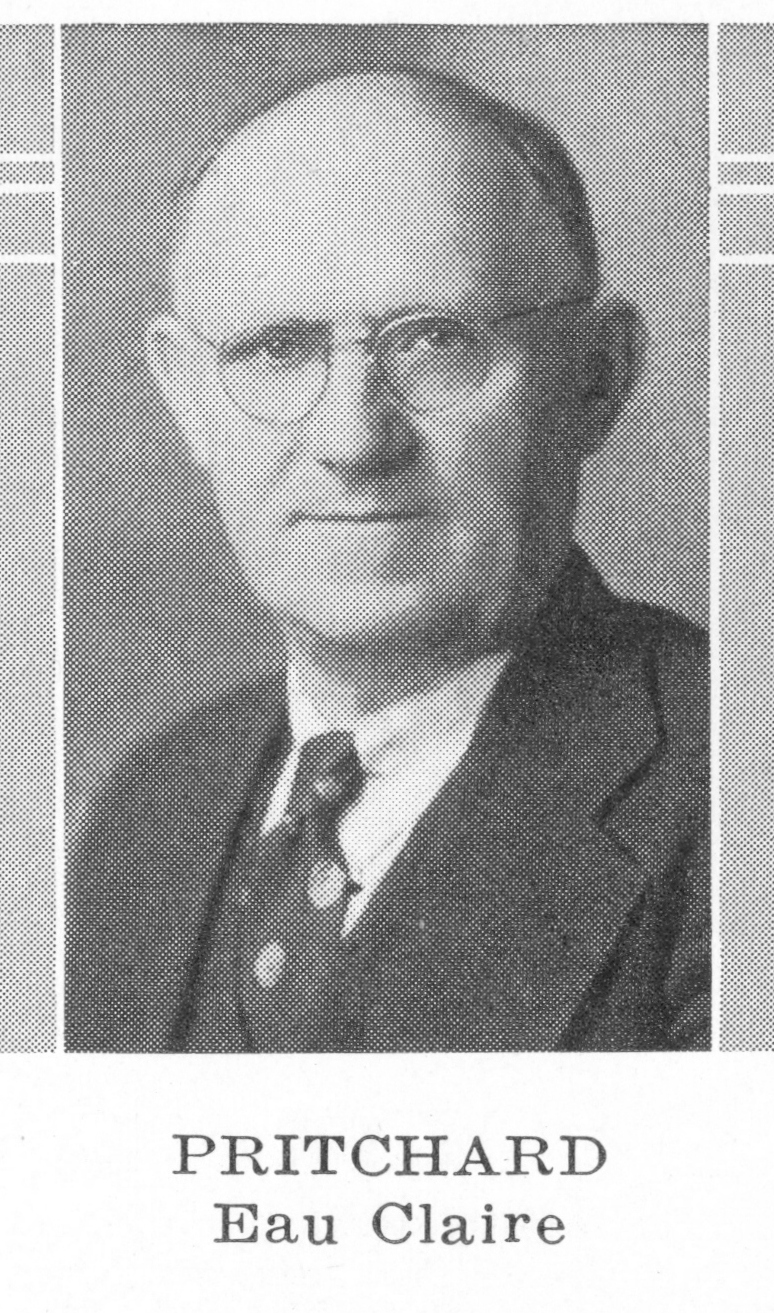
John T. Pritchard

John T. Pritchard (December 20, 1883 – June 2, 1965) was an American politician. He was a member of the Wisconsin State Assembly.

== Biography ==
Pritchard was born on December 20, 1883, in Caernarfon, Wales. He moved to the United States in 1905 and settled in Eau Claire, Wisconsin. Pritchard later attended the University of Wisconsin-Madison, where he studied agriculture. A lifelong dairy farmer, he had seven children with his wife, Mary (Pulvermacher) Pritchard. He died on June 2, 1965.

== Career ==
Pritchard was a member of the Assembly from 1933 to 1953 and 1957 to 1962. Additionally, he was a member of the Eau Claire County, Wisconsin Board. He ran for Assembly as a member of the Republican, Democratic and Progressive parties.
