= Henry W. Timmer =

American politician

Henry W. Timmer (June 18, 1873 – December 8, 1963) was an American farmer, businessman, and politician.

Born in Gibbsville, Sheboygan County, Wisconsin, Timmer went to Sheboygan Business School. He was a farmer, bank clerk, hardware dealer, and tinsmith. He owned a hardware store in Waldo, Wisconsin. He served as Sheboygan County clerk and on the Sheboygan County Board of Supervisors. Timmer also served as town clerk, town, treasurer, and chairman of the town board. Timmer was the postmaster for Waldo, Wisconsin and was a Republican. He was a member of the Sheboygan County Normal School Board and clerk of the local Selective System Board. From 1945 to 1955, Timmer served in the Wisconsin State Assembly. Timmer died at a hospital in Plymouth, Wisconsin.
