= Harold Gade =

American politician

Harold Gade (February 12, 1899 – November 18, 1985) was a member of the Wisconsin State Assembly.

== Biography ==
Gade was born on February 12, 1899, in Denmark. He later moved to Racine, Wisconsin.

== Career ==
Gade was elected to the Assembly in 1948. Previously, he was a Racine alderman from 1945 to 1947. He was a Democrat. In 1952, he was sentenced to Waupun State Prison for embezzling nearly $37,000.
