= Raleigh W. Falbe =

American politician

Raleigh W. Falbe was a member of the Wisconsin State Assembly.

== Biography ==
Falbe was born on March 21, 1890, in Milwaukee, Wisconsin. From 1918 to 1936, he was an officer of the Milwaukee Police Department. Falbe was a police officer for the Milwaukee Police Department. He was drafted for military service during World War II but was released from military service and returned to the police force. Falbe was also in the insurance, real estate. tavern, and restaurant business. Falbe served in the Wisconsin State Assembly from 1949 to 1955 and was a Republican. He died on October 6, 1957, in a Ripon, Wisconsin hospital after suffering a heart attack while duck hunting. and is buried in Brookfield, Wisconsin.
