= Elmer L. Genzmer =

American politician

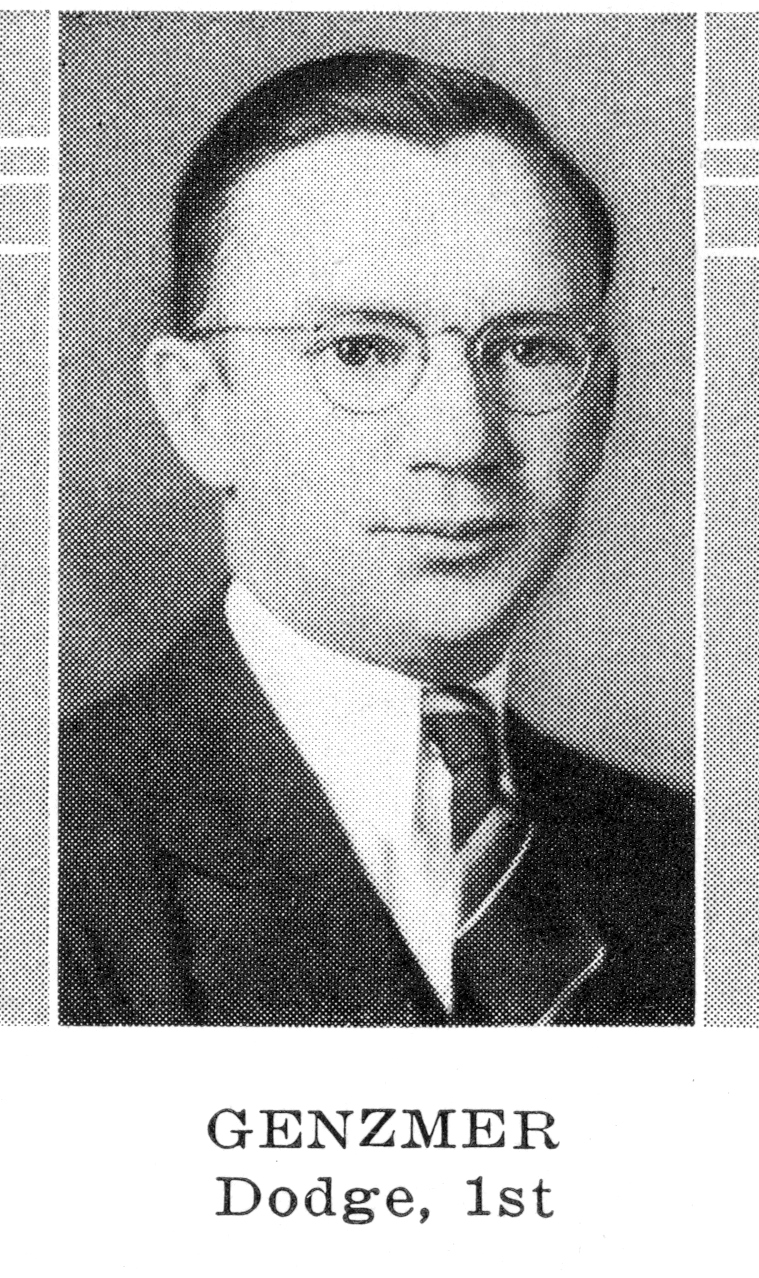
Elmer L. Genzmer

Elmer L. Genzmer was a member of the Wisconsin State Assembly.

== Biography ==
Genzmer was born on January 3, 1903, in Mayville, Wisconsin. He would attend the University of Wisconsin–Milwaukee and Marquette University Law School. Genzmer died on December 11, 1977.

== Career ==
Genzmer was a Justice of the Peace in Mayville from 1930 until 1942, when he became Mayor, serving until 1956. He became a member of the Assembly in 1935 and remained a member until 1962. During his time in the Assembly, he changed political parties, leaving the Democratic Party for the Republican Party.
