= Robert P. Robinson (Wisconsin politician) =

American politician (1884–1953)

Robert P. Robinson (May 15, 1884 – December 26, 1953) was a member of the Wisconsin State Senate from the 15th District (Rock County).

== Biography ==
Robinson was born on May 15, 1884, in Beloit, Wisconsin. During World War I, he served in the United States Army. He received his degree from Beloit College and was in the advertising business. He died on December 26, 1953.

== Political career ==
Robinson served on the school board and the Beloit Common Council. He was a member of the Senate from 1943 until his death. He was a Republican.
