= George A. Mayer =

American politician

George A. Mayer (1917-2000) was a member of the Wisconsin State Senate.

== Biography ==
Mayer was born on January 10, 1917, in Milwaukee County, Wisconsin. During World War II, he served in the United States Army. He graduated from Yale University and Harvard Law School. He was a lawyer and stock broker. He served on the Chenequa, Wisconsin, village board and died in Chenequa on December 15, 2000.

== Political career ==
Mayer was a member of the Senate from 1949 to 1952. He was a Republican.
