= Clayton Hicks =

American politician

Member of the Wisconsin Senate from the 12th district
- In office 1949–1953

Personal details
- Born: William Clayton Hicks; June 17, 1919 Phillips, Wisconsin
- Died: June 9, 1999 (aged 79) Montgomery, Texas
- Education: University of Wisconsin–Madison

Military service
- Branch/service: United States Army
- Battles/wars: World War II

William Clayton Hicks (June 17, 1919 – June 9, 1999) was an American politician and businessman who served as a member of the Wisconsin State Senate from 1949 to 1953.

== Early life and education ==
Hicks was born on June 17, 1919, in Phillips, Wisconsin. He graduated from Phillips High School and the University of Wisconsin–Madison. He later studied at Harvard Business School.

== Career ==
During World War II, Hicks served in the United States Army. Afterwards, he transferred to the United States Army Reserve. He was vice-president and corporate controller at Sears, Roebuck and Company.

Hicks was elected to the Wisconsin State Senate in 1948. Additionally, he was Clerk of Price County, Wisconsin. He was a Republican.

== Death ==
He died on June 9, 1999, in Montgomery, Texas.
