= Robert McCutchin =

American farmer and politician

Robert McCutchin (April 15, 1894 – December 8, 1973) was an American farmer and politician.

Born in the town of Arena, Iowa County, Wisconsin, McCutchin went to the University of Wisconsin College of Agriculture and was a farmer. McCutchin was also involved with the cheese, insurance, and telephone businesses. McCutchin served on the Iowa County Board of Supervisors and was chairman of the Arena Town Board. He also served on the Iowa County Defense Council and the Wisconsin Conservation Commission. McCutchin served in the Wisconsin State Assembly as a Progressive and later a Republican during the 1943, 1947, 1949 and 1951 sessions. In 1958, he was an unsuccessful candidate as a Democrat. Later, he lived in Spring Green, Wisconsin.

McCutchin died in a hospital in Prairie du Sac, Wisconsin.
