= Martin O. Monson =

American farmer, road contractor, and politician

Martin O. Monson (May 1, 1885 – November 11, 1969) was an American farmer, road contractor, and politician.

Born in Argyle, Wisconsin, Monson took a business course. He was a farmer and a road contractor providing gravel for roads, driveways, and concrete work. Monson served as chairman of the Wiota, Wisconsin Town Board and on the Lafayette County, Wisconsin Board of Supervisors. He was active with the Dairyland Cooperative. From 1947 to 1955, Monson served in the Wisconsin State Assembly and was a Republican. Monson died in a hospital in Monroe, Wisconsin.
