= Jess Miller =

American politician (1884-1965)

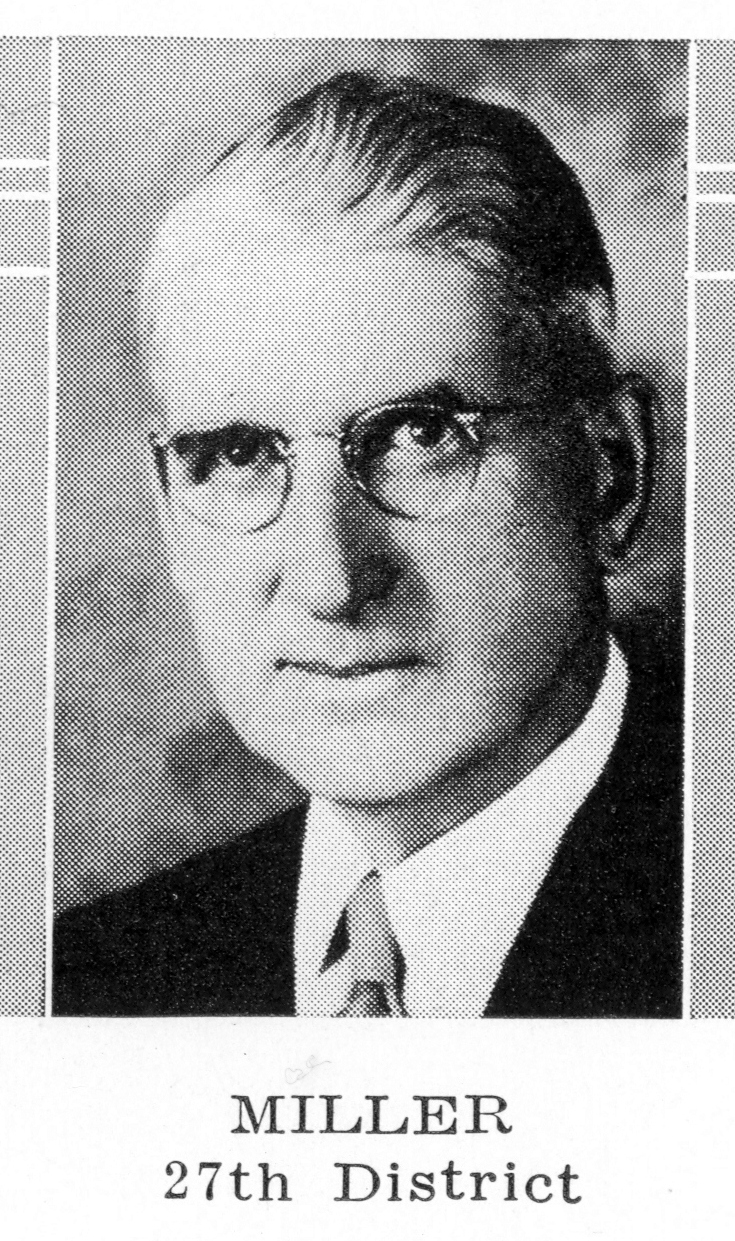

Member of the Wisconsin Senate from the 27th district
- In office January 2, 1939 – December 11, 1965 (died)
- Preceded by: E. Myrwyn Rowlands
- Succeeded by: Walter Terry

Personal details
- Born: August 26, 1884 Eagle, Richland County, Wisconsin, U.S.
- Died: December 11, 1965 (aged 81) Richland Center, Wisconsin, U.S.
- Cause of death: Stroke
- Resting place: Richland Center Cemetery, Richland Center
- Party: Republican
- Spouse: Mary Belle Collard (died 1956)

Jess Miller (August 26, 1884 – December 11, 1965) was an American farmer, realtor, auctioneer, and Republican politician from Richland County, Wisconsin. He served nearly 27 years in the Wisconsin Senate, representing Wisconsin's 27th Senate district from 1939 until his death in 1965. For many years, he was chairman of the powerful Senate Highway Committee. He also served several years on the Richland County board of supervisors, and the county's highway commission.

== Biography ==
Jess Miller was born on his family's farm in the town of Eagle, in Richland County, Wisconsin. Educated in the local public schools, Miller tended his family farm and worked as a realtor and auctioneer. He held a number of local political offices; in 1938, Miller was elected to the Wisconsin Senate; he was re-elected six times, serving until his death.

He was in poor health for much of the 1965 term of the Legislature, and suffered a stroke in December of that year. He died at a hospital in Richland Center, Wisconsin, on December 11, 1965.
