= Roy H. Sengstock =

American politician

Roy H. Sengstock (February 3, 1913 – February 1, 1981) was a member of the Wisconsin State Assembly.

== Biography ==
Sengstock was born on February 3, 1913, in Marinette, Wisconsin. He attended the University of Wisconsin-Madison and served in the regular United States Army and the United States Army Air Corps. Before entering politics, he worked as a school teacher and in the insurance business, as well as a factory worker. After his political career, he served as a church business manager. He died on February 1, 1981.

== Political career ==
Sengstock was a Republican and was a member of the Wisconsin State Assembly twice. He began his first term in 1941 but gave it up in 1942 to serve in the military. His second term was from 1947 to 1955. Sengstock announced his retirement from politics in 1956.

== See also ==
- The Political Graveyard
