= Hustler, Wisconsin =

- Village
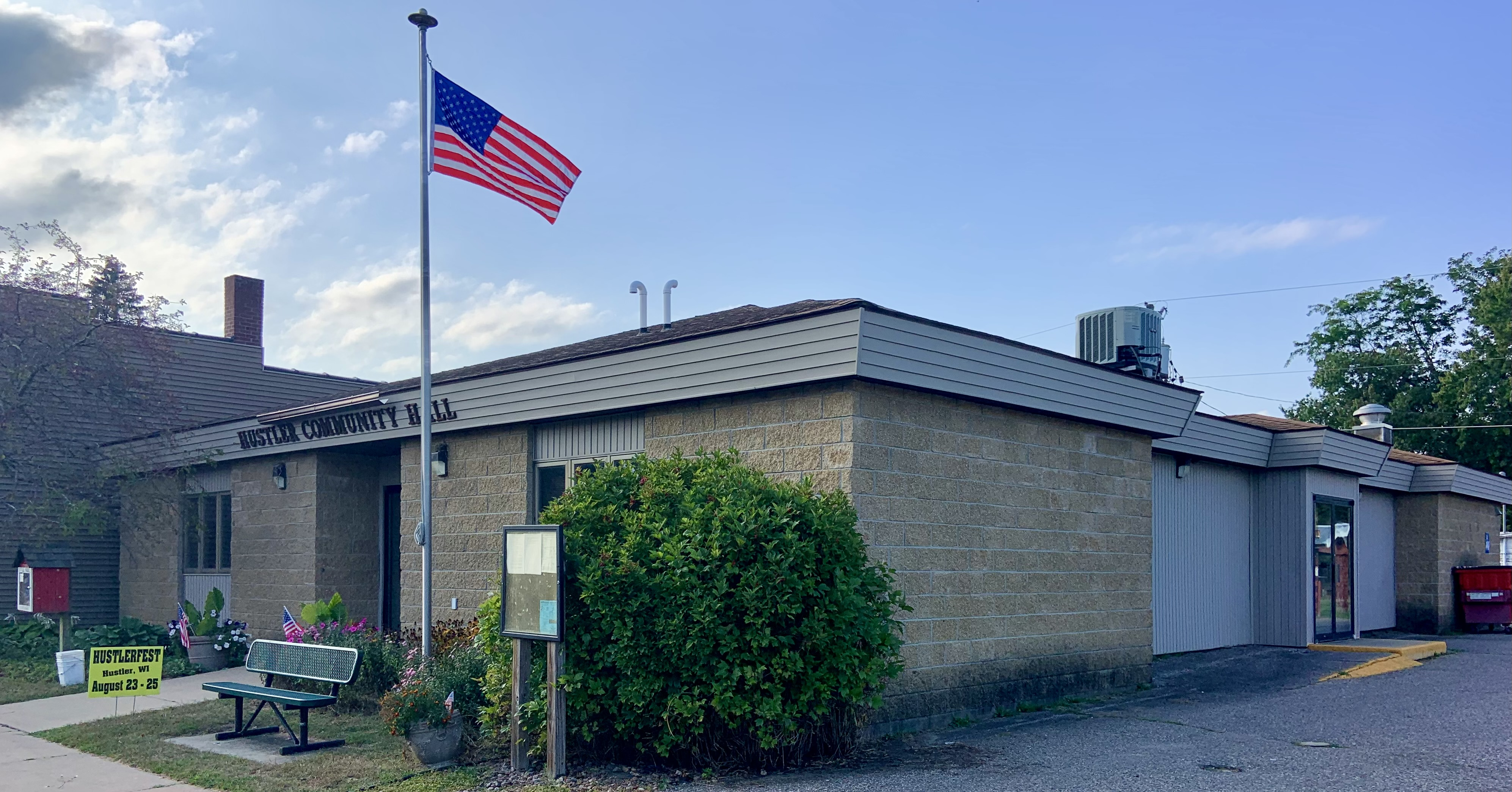
- Village hall

- Location of Hustler in Juneau County, Wisconsin
- Coordinates: 43°52′43″N 90°16′11″W
- Country: United States
- State: Wisconsin
- County: Juneau

Area
  - Total: 0.70 sq mi (1.81 km^{2})
  - Land: 0.70 sq mi (1.81 km^{2})
  - Water: 0 sq mi (0 km^{2})
- Elevation: 928 ft (283 m)

Population (2020)
  - Total: 162
  - Density: 232/sq mi (89.5/km^{2})
- Time zone: UTC-6 (Central (CST))
  - Summer (DST): UTC-5 (CDT)
- Area code: 608
- FIPS code: 55-36675
- GNIS feature ID: 1566833

Hustler is a village in Juneau County, Wisconsin, United States. The population was 162 at the 2020 census.

== History ==
A post office called Hustler was established in 1891, and remained in operation until it was discontinued in 1985. The village was so named from the fact its original settlers were hustlers (i.e. "one full of energy and push"). Hustler has been noted for its unusual place name.

== Geography ==
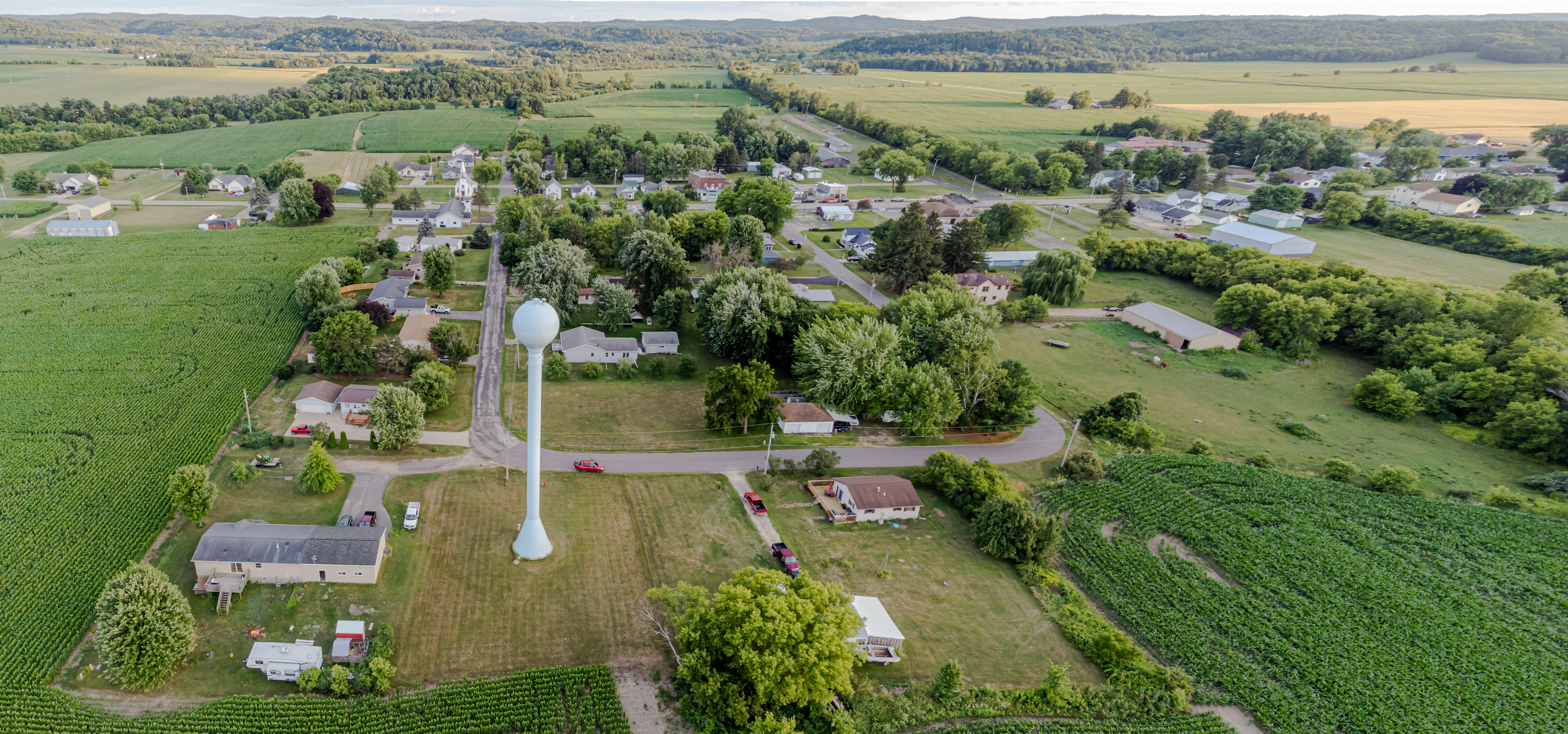

Hustler is located at 43°52′43″N 90°16′11″W (43.878506, -90.269805).

According to the United States Census Bureau, the village has a total area of 0.69 square miles (1.79 km^{2}), all land.

== Demographics ==
Historical population
Census	Pop.	Note	%±
1920	163		—
1930	161		−1.2%
1940	167		3.7%
1950	194		16.2%
1960	177		−8.8%
1970	190		7.3%
1980	170		−10.5%
1990	156		−8.2%
2000	113		−27.6%
2010	194		71.7%
2020	162		−16.5%
U.S. Decennial Census

=== 2010 census ===
As of the census of 2010, there were 194 people, 84 households, and 45 families living in the village. The population density was 281.2 inhabitants per square mile (108.6/km^{2}). There were 89 housing units at an average density of 129 per square mile (49.8/km^{2}). The racial makeup of the village was 97.9% White, 0.5% Asian, and 1.5% from two or more races. Hispanic or Latino people of any race were 1.5% of the population.

There were 84 households, of which 22.6% had children under the age of 18 living with them, 44% were married couples living together, 2.4% had a female householder with no husband present, 7.1% had a male householder with no wife present, and 46.4% were non-families. 38.1% of all households were made up of individuals, and 26.2% had someone living alone who was 65 years of age or older. The average household size was 2.31 and the average family size was 3.11.

The median age in the village was 46.2 years. 22.2% of residents were under the age of 18; 5.1% were between the ages of 18 and 24; 21.6% were from 25 to 44; 26.3% were from 45 to 64; and 24.7% were 65 years of age or older. The gender makeup of the village was 45.9% male and 54.1% female.

=== 2000 census ===
As of the census of 2000, there were 113 people, 48 households, and 21 families living in the village. The population density was 181.7 people per square mile (70.4/km^{2}). There were 52 housing units at an average density of 83.6 per square mile (32.4/km^{2}). The racial makeup of the village was 99% White and 1% African American.

There were 48 households, out of which 16.7% had children under the age of 18 living with them, 37.5% were married couples living together, 6.3% had a female householder with no husband present, and 54.2% were non-families. 47.9% of all households were made up of individuals, and 37.5% had someone living alone who was 65 years of age or older. The average household size was 2.02 and the average family size was 2.91.

In the village, the population was spread out, with 18.6% under the age of 18, 2.7% from 18 to 24, 17.7% from 25 to 44, 17.7% from 45 to 64, and 43.4% who were 65 years of age or older. The median age was 55 years. For every 100 females, there were 105.5 males. For every 100 females age 18 and over, there were 87.8 males.

The median income for a household in the village was $21,250, and the median income for a family was $45,625. Males had a median income of $38,750 versus $17,917 for females. The per capita income for the village was $15,839. There were no families and 5.4% of the population living below the poverty line, including no under eighteens and none of those over 64.
