= Hamburg, Marathon County, Wisconsin =

Town of Hamburg
- Town
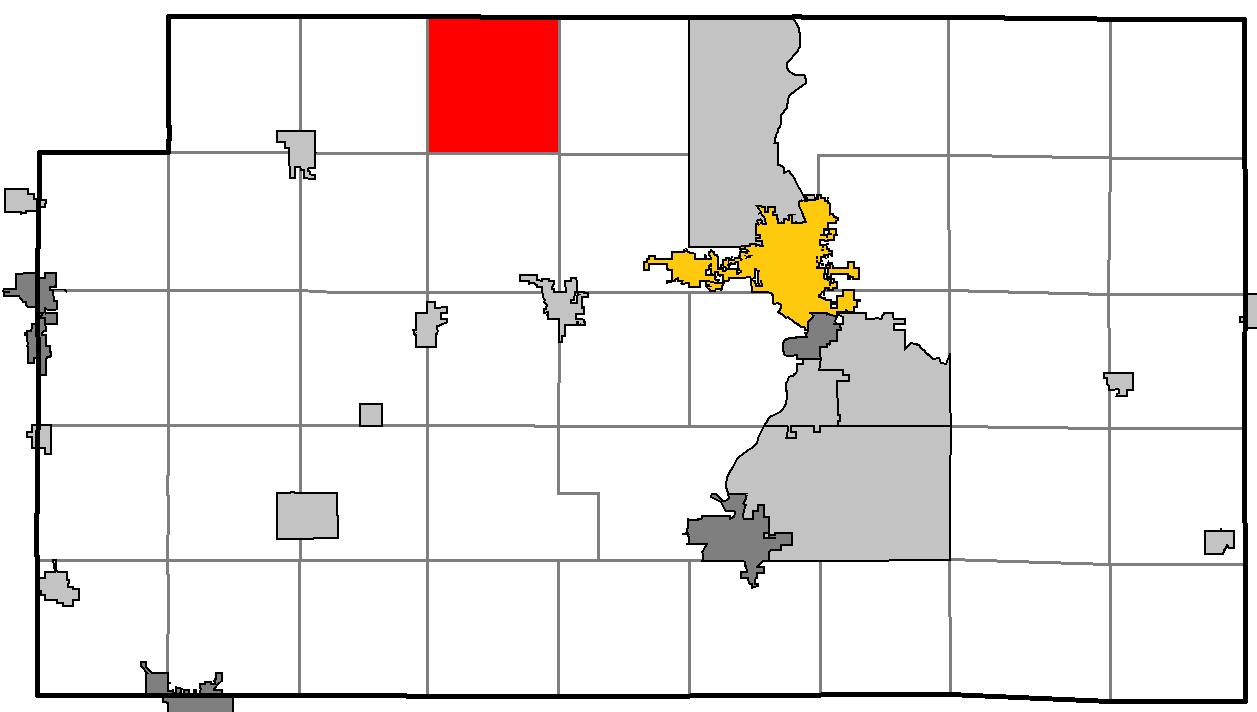
- Location of the Town of Hamburg, Marathon County

- Location of Marathon County, Wisconsin
- Coordinates: 45°4′22″N 89°54′57″W
- Country: United States
- State: Wisconsin
- County: Marathon

Area
  - Total: 35.4 sq mi (91.6 km^{2})
  - Land: 35.4 sq mi (91.6 km^{2})
  - Water: 0 sq mi (0.0 km^{2})
- Elevation: 1,388 ft (423 m)

Population (2020)
  - Total: 827
  - Density: 23.4/sq mi (9.03/km^{2})
- Time zone: UTC-6 (Central (CST))
  - Summer (DST): UTC-5 (CDT)
- Area codes: 715 & 534
- FIPS code: 55-32200
- GNIS feature ID: 1583338
- Website: https://www.townofhamburg.org/

Hamburg is a town in Marathon County, Wisconsin, United States. It is part of the Wausau, Wisconsin Metropolitan Statistical Area. As of the 2020 census, the town had a population of 827. The unincorporated community of Little Chicago is located within the town.

== Geography ==
According to the United States Census Bureau, the town has a total area of 35.4 square miles (91.6 km^{2}), all land.

== Demographics ==
At the 2000 census there were 910 people, 285 households, and 243 families living in the town. The population density was 25.7 people per square mile (9.9/km^{2}). There were 303 housing units at an average density of 8.6 per square mile (3.3/km^{2}). The racial makeup of the town was 96.26% White, 0.55% African American, 0.44% Native American, 0.33% Asian, 0.22% from other races, and 2.20% from two or more races. Hispanic or Latino of any race were 0.77%.

Of the 285 households 46.7% had children under the age of 18 living with them, 77.2% were married couples living together, 3.9% had a female householder with no husband present, and 14.7% were non-families. 11.2% of households were one person and 4.6% were one person aged 65 or older. The average household size was 3.19 and the average family size was 3.47.

The age distribution was 33.5% under the age of 18, 6.9% from 18 to 24, 32.9% from 25 to 44, 17.4% from 45 to 64, and 9.3% 65 or older. The median age was 32 years. For every 100 females, there were 101.3 males. For every 100 females age 18 and over, there were 107.2 males.

The median household income was $50,500 and the median family income was $52,667. Males had a median income of $29,569 versus $25,156 for females. The per capita income for the town was $15,920. About 3.3% of families and 5.4% of the population were below the poverty line, including 5.5% of those under age 18 and 10.7% of those age 65 or over.

== Notable people ==
- Martin C. Lueck, farmer and politician, was born in the town
