= Martin F. Howard =

American politician

Martin F. Howard (September 12, 1892 – April 9, 1969) was a member of the Wisconsin State Assembly.

== Early life and education ==
Howard was born in Milwaukee, Wisconsin. He received a religious-based education in West Allis, Wisconsin. He served in overseas during World War I, where he was a sergeant in the U.S. Army infantry.

He worked as an electrician, an automobile dealer, an insurance agent, and as a manufacturer's representative.

== Political career ==
Howard was elected to the Assembly in 1934 and 1936 as a Democrat, until being defeated in 1938. He was re-elected as a Republican in 1946, 1948 and 1950, and defeated in 1952 and 1954. Additionally, he was a Republican candidate for the Wisconsin State Senate in 1942 and 1962.

== Death ==
He died in 1969, and is buried in Holy Sepulcher Cemetery, Cudahy, Wisconsin.
