= Martin C. Lueck =

American farmer and politician

Martin C. Lueck (February 27, 1888 – January 21, 1986) was an American farmer and politician.

Born in the town of Hamburg, Wisconsin in Marathon County, Wisconsin, Lueck went to the Marathon County School of Agriculture and Domestic Economy. He was a farmer. He served on the Hamburg Town Board and chairman of the town board, served as the town assessor, and the clerk of the district school board, and served on the Marathon County Board of Supervisors. Lueck served in the Wisconsin State Assembly and was a Republican.
