= Leland McParland =

American politician

Leland S. McParland (December 18, 1896 – December 10, 1989) was an American Democratic politician and attorney in Wisconsin. He served in the Wisconsin Legislature from 1941 to 1970.

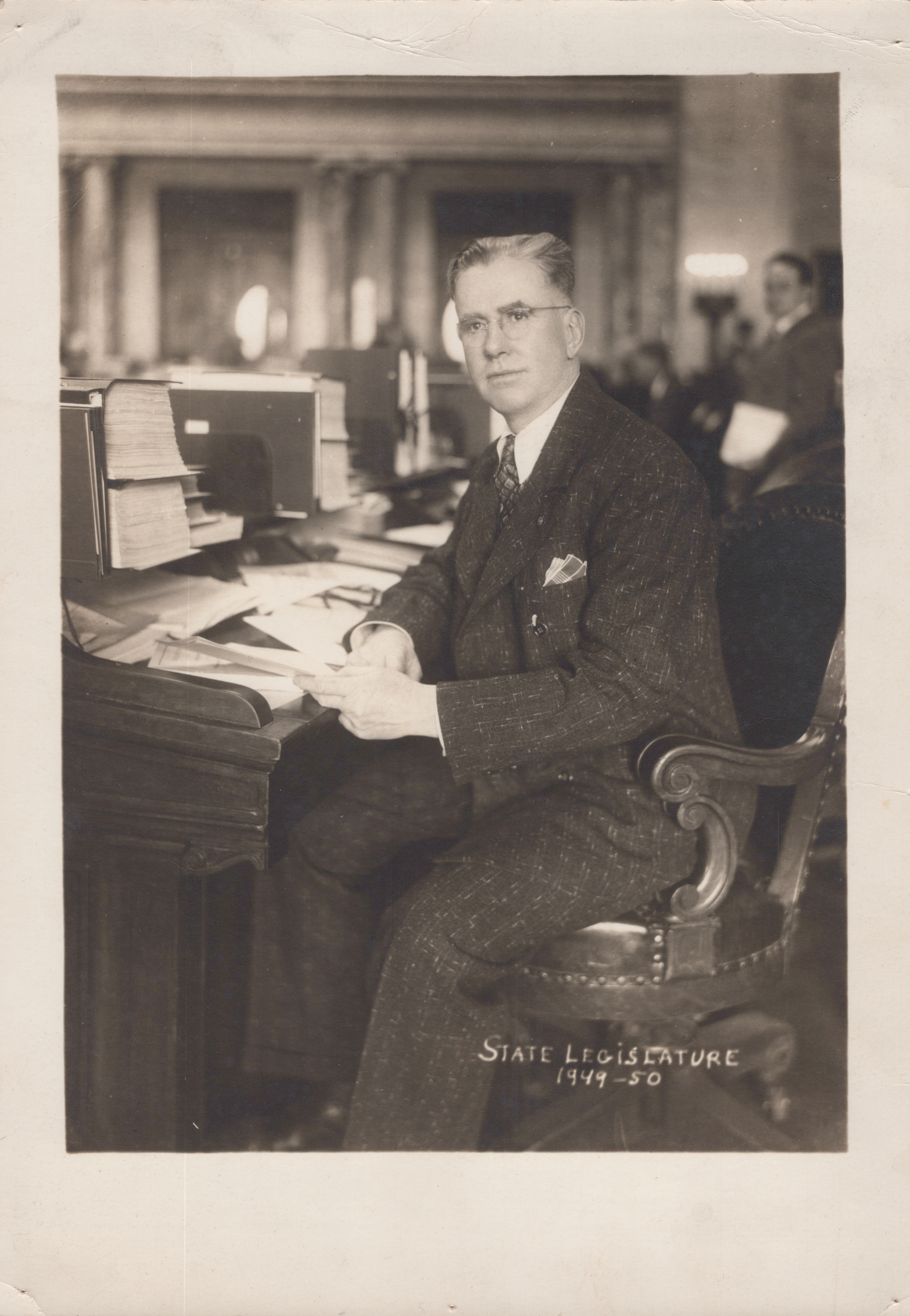
Leland S McParland Wisconsin State Legislature 1949-50

Born in Thorp, Wisconsin on December 18, 1896, he attended Thorp public schools, then studied at the then-Oshkosh State College for two years. After service in the United States Navy during World War I, he worked as a teacher in South Milwaukee from 1920 to 1927 while he studied law at Marquette University, becoming a practicing lawyer in 1927.

== Legislature ==
He was first elected to the Wisconsin State Assembly in 1940 as a Democrat, representing Milwaukee County's southern suburbs. He served as the floor leader for the Democrats in the 1945-1950 sessions. He was first elected to the Senate in 1954, and was reelected in 1958, 1962, and 1966. In 1970 he was unseated in the Democratic primary by Kurt Frank in a four-way race which included John Plewa, himself later to succeed Frank as senator from this district.

=== Oak Creek Law ===
It was in part due to McParlan's strategic place in the Senate that the "Oak Creek Law" was passed in 1955, enabling semi-rural Oak Creek, part of his district, to incorporate as a city, thus frustrating annexation by the City of Milwaukee.

=== Student demonstrations in Madison ===
When student demonstrators at the University of Wisconsin-Madison took over campus in 1967 in protest over the presence of Dow Chemical, manufacturers of napalm, McParland pronounced, "We should shoot them if necessary. I would, I would, because it's insurrection."
