= Edward F. Mertz =

American politician

Member of the Wisconsin State Assembly from the multiple district
- In office 1949–1957
- Constituency: 16th Milwaukee (1949-1957)
- In office 1963–1965
- Constituency: 9th Milwaukee

Personal details
- Born: August 15, 1890 Milwaukee, Wisconsin
- Died: May 1970 (aged 79)

Edward F. Mertz (August 15, 1890 - May 1970) was a member of the Wisconsin State Assembly.

== Biography ==
Mertz was born on August 15, 1890, in Milwaukee, Wisconsin, where he attended a parochial school. During World War I, he served in the United States Army.

== Political career ==
Mertz was first elected to the Assembly in 1948 for the 16th Milwaukee District, serving from in total from 1949 to 1957. He represented the 9th Milwaukee district from 1963 to 1965. Additionally, he was a delegate to the 1952 Democratic National Convention. Mertz died in May 1970.
