= Louis C. Romell =

American politician

Louis Charles Romell (April 7, 1899 – February 5, 1987) was a member of the Wisconsin State Assembly.

== Biography ==
Romell was born on April 7, 1899, in Chicago, Illinois. He later served in the United States Army. He died on February 5, 1987.

== Political career ==
Romell was a member of the Assembly twice. He was a member from 1947 to 1955 before being elected again in 1960. Romell then won re-election in 1962 and 1964. Romell was defeated in the 1966 Republican primary by recent UW Law School graduate and Madison Young Republican chairman Tommy Thompson, who held the seat until being elected governor in 1987.

Romell had previously been an unsuccessful candidate for the Assembly in 1942 as a member of the Wisconsin Progressive Party. Romell was also Supervisor and a member of the School Board of Adams, Wisconsin and a member of the Adams County, Wisconsin Board.
