= 68th Wisconsin Legislature =

Wisconsin legislative term for 1947–1948

←	67th	69th	→
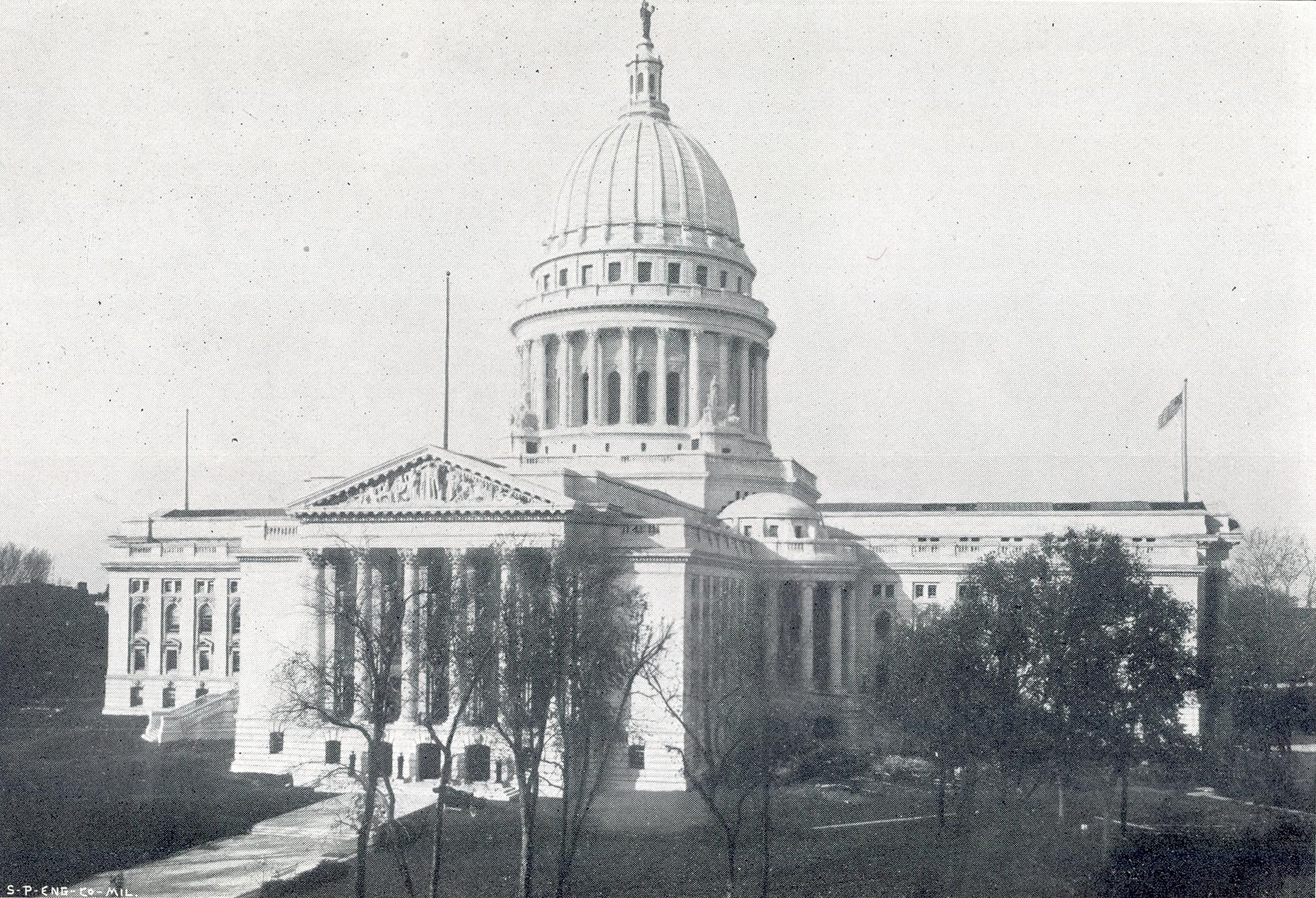
- Wisconsin State Capitol ca.1915

Overview
- Legislative body: Wisconsin Legislature
- Meeting place: Wisconsin State Capitol
- Term: January 6, 1947 – January 3, 1949
- Election: November 5, 1946

Senate
- Members: 33
- Senate President: Oscar Rennebohm (R) ^{(until Mar. 12, 1947)}
- President pro tempore: Frank E. Panzer (R)
- Party control: Republican

Assembly
- Members: 100
- Assembly Speaker: Donald C. McDowell (R)
- Party control: Republican

Sessions
- Regular: January 8, 1947 – September 11, 1947

Special sessions
- Jul. 1948 Spec.: July 19, 1948 – July 20, 1948

The Sixty-Eighth Wisconsin Legislature convened from January 8, 1947, to September 11, 1947, in regular session, and reconvened in a special session in July 1948.

Senators representing odd-numbered districts were newly elected for this session and were serving the first two years of a four-year term. Assembly members were elected to a two-year term. Assembly members and odd-numbered senators were elected in the general election of November 5, 1946. Senators representing even-numbered districts were serving the third and fourth year of a four-year term, having been elected in the general election of November 7, 1944.

The governor of Wisconsin at the start of this legislative term was Republican Walter Samuel Goodland, of Racine County, serving the first months of his third two-year term, having won re-election in the 1946 Wisconsin gubernatorial election. Goodland died of a heart attack on March 12, 1947. At that time, the lieutenant governor, Republican Oscar Rennebohm, of Dane County, then ascended to become governor for the remainder of this legislative term.

== Major events ==
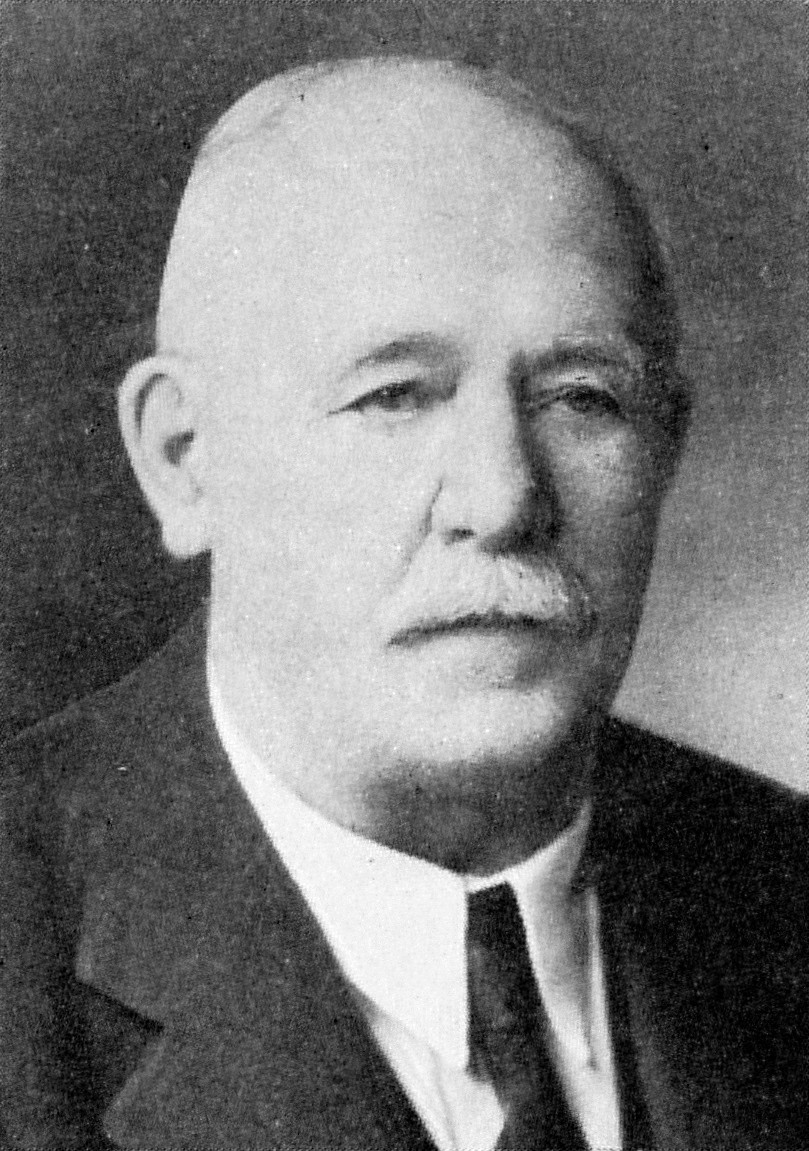
Governor Walter S. Goodland (1862–1947)

- January 6, 1947: Third inauguration of Walter Samuel Goodland as Governor of Wisconsin.
- February 20, 1947: The U.S. Army Hermes program launched the Blossom I rocket into space, carrying plants and fruit flies. These were first the living things launched into space by humans.
- March 12, 1947:
  - U.S. President Harry S. Truman announced the Truman Doctrine to Congress, stating that it would be U.S. policy to defend democracies against authoritarian threats.
  - Wisconsin governor Walter Samuel Goodland died in office. He was immediately succeeded by Lieutenant Governor Oscar Rennebohm as the 32nd governor of Wisconsin.
- April 1, 1947: Judge Henry P. Hughes was elected to the Wisconsin Supreme Court, defeating incumbent justice James Ward Rector.
- April 16, 1947: The first use of the term Cold War to describe the postwar tensions between the U.S. and Soviet Union.
- May 22, 1947: U.S. President Harry Truman signed an act of Congress implementing his Truman doctrine and providing military and economic aide to Turkey and Greece.
- June 23, 1947: The U.S. Congress overrode President Harry Truman's veto of the Taft–Hartley Act, restricting the powers of labor unions.
- July 26, 1947: U.S. President Harry Truman signed the National Security Act of 1947, creating the United States Department of Defense, the Joint Chiefs of Staff, the United States National Security Council, and the Central Intelligence Agency.
- October 5, 1947: U.S. President Harry Truman delivered the first televised presidential address.
- October 14, 1947: U.S. Air Force pilot Chuck Yeager was the first man to travel faster than the speed of sound, piloting the Bell X-1 rocket plane.
- October 30, 1947: The General Agreement on Tariffs and Trade was signed by 23 nations in Geneva, Switzerland.
- November 24, 1947: The U.S. House of Representatives voted to approve citations of Contempt of Congress against the "Hollywood Ten" for refusing to testify before the House Un-American Activities Committee.
- November 29, 1947: The United Nations Partition Plan for Palestine was approved by the United Nations General Assembly.
- January 30, 1948: Indian anti-colonial peace activist Mahatma Gandhi was assassinated in New Delhi.
- March 8, 1948: In the case McCollum v. Board of Education, the United States Supreme Court ruled that religious instruction in public schools violated the U.S. Constitution.
- April 3, 1948: U.S. President Harry Truman signed the Marshall Plan (the European Recovery Program) into law.
- April 8, 1948: Wisconsin Supreme Court justice Chester A. Fowler died in office.
- June 1, 1948: Wisconsin Governor Oscar Rennebohm appointed John E. Martin to the Wisconsin Supreme Court, to succeed the deceased justice Chester A. Fowler.
- June 24, 1948: The Soviet Union implemented a blockade of West Berlin.
- June 26, 1948: Wisconsin Supreme Court justice Elmer E. Barlow died in office.
- July 26, 1948: U.S. President Harry Truman signed Executive Order 9981, ending racial segregation in the United States Armed Forces
- November 2, 1948: 1948 United States general election:
  - Harry S. Truman (D) elected President of the United States.
  - Oscar Rennebohm elected Governor of Wisconsin.
  - Wisconsin voters rejected an amendment to the state constitution to repeal the section on municipal eminent domain.
- November 12, 1948: Wisconsin Governor Oscar Rennebohm appointed Grover L. Broadfoot to the Wisconsin Supreme Court, to succeed the deceased justice Elmer E. Barlow.
- December 9, 1948: The United Nations General Assembly adopted the Convention on the Prevention and Punishment of the Crime of Genocide.
- December 10, 1948: The United Nations General Assembly adopted the Universal Declaration of Human Rights.

== Major legislation ==
- June 26, 1947: An Act ... relating to records of state officers and making an appropriation, 1947 Act 316. Created the Committee on Public Records within the Wisconsin Historical Society.
- July 16, 1947: An Act ... providing for a commissioner of banks, a commissioner of saving and loan associations, a supervisor of credit unions, and a credit union review board, abolishing the banking commission, transferring files and personnel, making an appropriation, and providing penalties, 1947 Act 411. Reorganized the Wisconsin Department of Banking and related agencies.
- 1947 Joint Resolution 48: Second legislative passage of a proposed amendment to the state constitution to repeal the section on municipal eminent domain. This amendment was rejected by voters at the November 1948 election.

== Party summary ==
=== Senate summary ===
Senate partisan composition Democratic: 5 seats Progressive: 1 seat Republican: 27 seats

	Party (Shading indicates majority caucus)			Total	
	Dem.	Prog.	Rep.	Total	Vacant
End of previous Legislature	6	5	21	32	1
Start of Reg. Session	5	1	27	33	0
Final voting share	18.18%		81.82%		
Beginning of the next Legislature	3	0	27	30	3

=== Assembly summary ===
Assembly partisan composition Democratic: 12 seats Republican: 88 seats

	Party (Shading indicates majority caucus)			Total	
	Dem.	Prog.	Rep.	Total	Vacant
End of previous Legislature	19	5	70	95	5
Start of Reg. Session	12	0	88	100	0
From Oct. 2, 1947 (Note: Republican Ernest L. Riebau (Milwaukee County) died.)	12	0	87	99	1
Final voting share	12.12%		87.88%		
Beginning of the next Legislature	26	0	74	100	0

== Sessions ==
- Regular session: January 8, 1947 – September 11, 1947
- July 1948 special session: July 19, 1948 – July 20, 1948

== Leaders ==
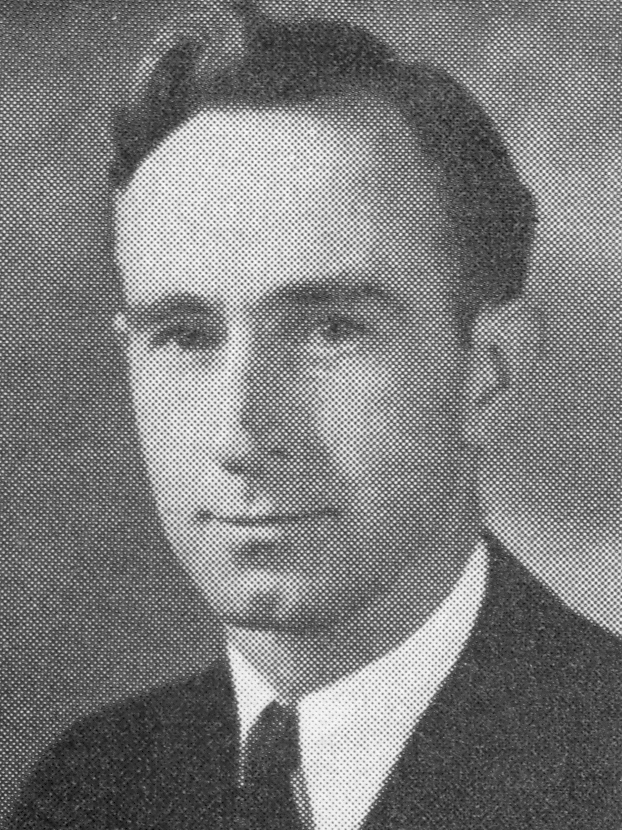
Assembly leader Vernon W. Thomson

=== Senate leadership ===
- President of the Senate: Oscar Rennebohm (R) (until Mar. 12, 1947)
- President pro tempore: Frank E. Panzer (R–Oakfield)
- Majority leader: Warren P. Knowles (R–New Richmond)
- Minority leader: Robert Emmet Tehan (D–Milwaukee)

=== Assembly leadership ===
- Speaker of the Assembly: Donald C. McDowell (R–Soldiers Grove)
- Majority leader: Vernon W. Thomson (R–Richland Center)
- Minority leader: Leland McParland (D–Milwaukee)

== Members ==
=== Members of the Senate ===
Members of the Senate for the Sixty-Eighth Wisconsin Legislature:

Senate partisan representation Democratic: 5 seats Progressive: 1 seat Republican: 27 seats

Dist.	Counties	Senator	Residence	Party
01	Door, Kewaunee, & Manitowoc	Everett LaFond	Two Rivers	Rep.
02	Brown & Oconto	Harold A. Lytie	Green Bay	Dem.
03	Milwaukee (South City)	Clement J. Zablocki	Milwaukee	Dem.
04	Milwaukee (Northeast County & Northeast City)	John C. McBride	Milwaukee	Rep.
05	Milwaukee (Northwest City)	Bernhard Gettelman	Milwaukee	Rep.
06	Milwaukee (North-Central City)	Edward Reuther	Milwaukee	Dem.
07	Milwaukee (Southeast County & Southeast City)	Anthony P. Gawronski	Milwaukee	Dem.
08	Milwaukee (Western County)	Allen Busby	West Milwaukee	Rep.
09	Milwaukee (City Downtown)	Robert E. Tehan	Milwaukee	Dem.
10	Buffalo, Pepin, Pierce, & St. Croix	Warren P. Knowles	New Richmond	Rep.
11	Bayfield, Burnett, Douglas, & Washburn	Arthur Lenroot Jr.	Superior	Rep.
12	Ashland, Iron, Price, Rusk, Sawyer, & Vilas	Ernest A. Heden	Glidden	Rep.
13	Dodge & Washington	Frank E. Panzer	Oakfield	Rep.
14	Outagamie & Shawano	Gordon A. Bubolz	Appleton	Rep.
15	Rock	Robert P. Robinson	Beloit	Rep.
16	Crawford, Grant, & Vernon	Foster B. Porter	Bloomington	Rep.
17	Green, Iowa, & Lafayette	Melvin Olson	South Wayne	Rep.
18	Fond du Lac, Green Lake & Waushara	Louis J. Fellenz Jr.	Fond du Lac	Rep.
19	Calumet & Winnebago	Taylor G. Brown	Oshkosh	Rep.
20	Ozaukee & Sheboygan	Gustave W. Buchen	Sheboygan	Rep.
21	Racine	Edward F. Hilker	Racine	Rep.
22	Kenosha & Walworth	Conrad Shearer	Kenosha	Rep.
23	Portage & Waupaca	Oscar W. Neale	Stevens Point	Rep.
24	Clark, Taylor, & Wood	Melvin Laird Jr.	Marshfield	Rep.
25	Lincoln & Marathon	Clifford Krueger	Merrill	Rep.
26	Dane	Fred Risser	Madison	Prog.
27	Columbia, Richland, & Sauk	Jess Miller	Richland Center	Rep.
28	Chippewa & Eau Claire	George H. Hipke	Stanley	Rep.
29	Barron, Dunn, & Polk	Charles D. Madsen	Luck	Rep.
30	Florence, Forest, Langlade, Marinette, & Oneida	Philip Downing	Amberg	Rep.
31	Adams, Juneau, Monroe, & Marquette	J. Earl Leverich	Sparta	Rep.
32	Jackson, La Crosse, & Trempealeau	Rudolph Schlabach	La Crosse	Rep.
33	Jefferson & Waukesha	Chester Dempsey	Hartland	Rep.

=== Members of the Assembly ===
Members of the Assembly for the Sixty-Eighth Wisconsin Legislature:

Assembly partisan composition Democratic: 12 seats Republican: 88 seats

Milwaukee County districts

Senate Dist.	County	Dist.	Representative	Party	Residence
31	Adams & Marquette		Louis C. Romell	Rep.	Adams
12	Ashland		Bernard J. Gehrmann	Rep.	Mellen
29	Barron		Charles H. Sykes	Rep.	Cameron
11	Bayfield		Samuel E. Squires	Rep.	Mason
02	Brown	1	Robert E. Lynch	Dem.	Green Bay
02	Brown	2	Harvey Larsen	Rep.	Denmark
10	Buffalo & Pepin		Grover L. Broadfoot	Rep.	Mondovi
11	Burnett & Washburn		Guy Benson	Rep.	Spooner
19	Calumet		Charles R. Barnard	Rep.	Brillion
28	Chippewa		Arthur L. Padrutt	Rep.	Chippewa Falls
24	Clark		Arthur E. Stadler	Rep.	Owen
27	Columbia		Arnie F. Betts	Rep.	Lodi
16	Crawford		Donald C. McDowell	Rep.	Soldiers Grove
26	Dane	1	Lyall T. Beggs	Rep.	Madison
26	Dane	2	Earl Mullen	Rep.	Blooming Grove
26	Dane	3	Rudy W. Roethlisberger	Rep.	Verona
13	Dodge	1	Elmer L. Genzmer	Rep.	Mayville
13	Dodge	2	Jesse A. Canniff	Rep.	Beaver Dam
01	Door		Alex Meunier	Rep.	Sturgeon Bay
11	Douglas	1	Albert D. Whealdon	Rep.	Superior
11	Douglas	2	Charles E. Nelson	Rep.	Superior
29	Dunn		Earl W. Hanson	Rep.	Elk Mound
28	Eau Claire		John T. Pritchard	Rep.	Eau Claire
30	Florence, Forest, & Oneida		Walter S. Fisher	Rep.	Minocqua
18	Fond du Lac	1	Myrton H. Duel	Rep.	Fond du Lac
18	Fond du Lac	2	Alfred Van De Zande	Rep.	Campbellsport
16	Grant	1	Robert S. Travis	Rep.	Platteville
16	Grant	2	Hugh A. Harper	Rep.	Lancaster
17	Green		Ray H. Schoonover	Rep.	Monroe
18	Green Lake & Waushara		Boyd A. Clark	Rep.	Wild Rose
17	Iowa		Robert McCutchin	Rep.	Arena
12	Iron & Vilas		Alex J. Raineri	Rep.	Hurley
32	Jackson		Casper D. Waller	Rep.	Black River Falls
33	Jefferson		Theodore S. Jones	Rep.	Lake Mills
31	Juneau		Ben Tremain	Rep.	Hustler
22	Kenosha	1	Frederick Pfennig	Rep.	Kenosha
22	Kenosha	2	George Molinaro	Dem.	Kenosha
01	Kewaunee		Joseph M. Mleziva	Rep.	Luxemburg
32	La Crosse	1	Raymond Bice Sr.	Rep.	La Crosse
32	La Crosse	2	Harry W. Schilling	Rep.	Onalaska
17	Lafayette		Martin O. Monson	Rep.	South Wayne
30	Langlade		Clair Finch	Rep.	Antigo
25	Lincoln		Emil A. Hinz	Rep.	Merrill
01	Manitowoc	1	Otto A. Vogel	Rep.	Manitowoc
01	Manitowoc	2	Frank J. LeClair	Rep.	Two Rivers
25	Marathon	1	Martin C. Lueck	Rep.	Hamburg
25	Marathon	2	Paul A. Luedtke	Rep.	Wausau
30	Marinette		Roy H. Sengstock	Rep.	Marinette
09	Milwaukee	1	John M. Cavey	Rep.	Milwaukee
06	Milwaukee	2	Michael F. O'Connell	Dem.	Milwaukee
08	Milwaukee	3	Louis Hicks	Rep.	West Allis
09	Milwaukee	4	Frank E. Schaeffer Jr.	Dem.	Milwaukee
03	Milwaukee	5	Casimir Kendziorski	Dem.	Milwaukee
09	Milwaukee	6	Le Roy Simmons	Dem.	Milwaukee
06	Milwaukee	7	Clyde Follansbee	Rep.	Milwaukee
08	Milwaukee	8	John E. Finnegan	Rep.	Milwaukee
05	Milwaukee	9	Edward L. Graf	Rep.	Milwaukee
07	Milwaukee	10	Leland McParland	Dem.	Cudahy
03	Milwaukee	11	Ervin J. Ryczek	Dem.	Milwaukee
07	Milwaukee	12	William Banach	Dem.	Milwaukee
04	Milwaukee	13	William Nawrocki	Dem.	Milwaukee
04	Milwaukee	14	John D. Heimick	Rep.	Milwaukee
05	Milwaukee	15	Charles E. Collar	Rep.	Milwaukee
06	Milwaukee	16	Ernest L. Riebau (died Oct. 2, 1947)	Rep.	Milwaukee
07	Milwaukee	17	Martin F. Howard	Rep.	Milwaukee
06	Milwaukee	18	Paul Jaeger	Rep.	Milwaukee
05	Milwaukee	19	Charles F. Westfahl	Rep.	Milwaukee
08	Milwaukee	20	Milton F. Burmaster	Rep.	Wauwatosa
31	Monroe		Alex L. Nicol	Rep.	Sparta
02	Oconto		John E. Youngs	Rep.	Oconto
14	Outagamie	1	Fred H. Frank	Rep.	Appleton
14	Outagamie	2	William M. Rohan	Rep.	Kaukauna
20	Ozaukee		Ralph Zaun	Rep.	Grafton
10	Pierce		Selmer W. Gunderson	Rep.	Spring Valley
29	Polk		Raymond A. Peabody	Rep.	Milltown
23	Portage		John Kostuck	Dem.	Stevens Point
12	Price		Mike Cummings	Rep.	Fifield
21	Racine	1	Carl C. Christensen	Rep.	Racine
21	Racine	2	Wallace E. Nield	Rep.	Racine
21	Racine	3	Randolph H. Runden	Rep.	Union Grove
27	Richland		Vernon W. Thomson	Rep.	Richland Center
15	Rock	1	Edward Grassman	Rep.	Edgerton
15	Rock	2	Burger M. Engebretson	Rep.	Beloit
12	Rusk & Sawyer		Herman Clausen	Rep.	Bruce
27	Sauk		George J. Woerth	Rep.	Prairie du Sac
14	Shawano		Charles Ebert	Rep.	Gresham
20	Sheboygan	1	John Schneider Jr.	Dem.	Sheboygan
20	Sheboygan	2	Henry W. Timmer	Rep.	Waldo
10	St. Croix		Elmer L. Rundell	Rep.	Roberts
24	Taylor		Nels Andersen	Rep.	Gilman
32	Trempealeau		Guilford M. Wiley	Rep.	Galesville
16	Vernon		Arthur O. Mockrud	Rep.	Westby
22	Walworth		Ora R. Rice	Rep.	Delavan
13	Washington		Theodore Holtebeck	Rep.	West Bend
33	Waukesha	1	David L. Dancey	Rep.	Waukesha
33	Waukesha	2	Alfred R. Ludvigsen	Rep.	Hartland
23	Waupaca		Julius Spearbraker	Rep.	Clintonville
19	Winnebago	1	Harvey R. Abraham	Rep.	Oshkosh
19	Winnebago	2	Richard J. Steffens	Rep.	Menasha
24	Wood		William W. Clark	Rep.	Vesper

== Committees ==
=== Senate committees ===
- Senate Standing Committee on Agriculture and Conservation – M. Olson, chair
- Senate Standing Committee on Committees – J. Miller, chair
- Senate Standing Committee on Contingent Expenditures – E. F. Hilker, chair
- Senate Standing Committee on Education and Public Welfare – R. P. Robinson, chair
- Senate Standing Committee on Highways – J. Miller, chair
- Senate Standing Committee on the Judiciary – G. W. Buchen, chair
- Senate Standing Committee on Labor and Management – L. J. Fellenz, chair
- Senate Standing Committee on Legislative Procedure – F. E. Panzer, chair
- Senate Standing Committee on State and Local Government – R. Schlabach, chair
- Senate Standing Committee on Veterans Affairs – F. B. Porter, chair

=== Assembly committees ===
- Assembly Standing Committee on Agriculture – O. R. Rice, chair
- Assembly Standing Committee on Commerce and Manufacturing – C. R. Barnard, chair
- Assembly Standing Committee on Conservation – J. E. Youngs, chair
- Assembly Standing Committee on Contingent Expenditures – J. M. Mleziva, chair
- Assembly Standing Committee on Education – W. W. Clark, chair
- Assembly Standing Committee on Elections – C. E. Collar, chair
- Assembly Standing Committee on Engrossed Bills – C. Ebert, chair
- Assembly Standing Committee on Enrolled Bills – E. L. Rundell, chair
- Assembly Standing Committee on Excise and Fees – W. S. Fisher, chair
- Assembly Standing Committee on Highways – H. A. Harper, chair
- Assembly Standing Committee on Insurance and Banking – B. M. Engebretson, chair
- Assembly Standing Committee on the Judiciary – V. W. Thomson, chair
- Assembly Standing Committee on Labor – E. L. Genzmer, chair
- Assembly Standing Committee on Municipalities – P. A. Luedtke, chair
- Assembly Standing Committee on Printing – G. J. Woerth, chair
- Assembly Standing Committee on Public Welfare – E. W. Hanson, chair
- Assembly Standing Committee on Revision – T. Holtebeck, chair
- Assembly Standing Committee on Rules – F. Pfennig, chair
- Assembly Standing Committee on State Affairs – R. H. Runden, chair
- Assembly Standing Committee on Taxation – J. A. Canniff, chair
- Assembly Standing Committee on Third Reading – F. H. Frank, chair
- Assembly Standing Committee on Transportation – A. Van De Zande, chair
- Assembly Standing Committee on Veterans and Military Affairs – C. C. Christensen, chair

=== Joint committees ===
- Joint Standing Committee on Finance – G. H. Hipke (Sen.) & J. Spearbraker (Asm.), co-chairs
- Joint Standing Committee on Revisions, Repeals, and Uniform Laws – J. C. McBride (Sen.) & M. F. Burmaster (Asm.), co-chairs
- Joint Legislative Council – W. P. Knowles (Sen.), chair

== Employees ==
=== Senate employees ===
- Chief Clerk: Thomas M. Donahue
  - Assistant Chief Clerk: W. Wrenn O'Connell
- Sergeant-at-Arms: Harold Damon
  - Assistant Sergeant-at-Arms: Edward R. Stoker

=== Assembly employees ===
- Chief Clerk: Arthur L. May
  - Assistant Chief Clerk: Robert H. Boyson
- Sergeant-at-Arms: Norris J. Kellman
