= Wisconsin's 24th Senate district =

American legislative district in west-central Wisconsin

Wisconsin's 24th State Senate district
- 2024 map defined in 2023 Wisc. Act 94; 2022 map defined in Johnson v. Wisconsin Elections Commission; 2011 map was defined in 2011 Wisc. Act 43 composed of Assembly districts 70, 71, and 72
Senator
| Patrick Testin; R–Stevens Point |
since January 3, 2017 (9 years, 55 days)
- Demographics: 90.19% White; 1.88% Black; 2.74% Hispanic; 2.09% Asian; 2.59% Native American; 0.12% Hawaiian/Pacific Islander
- Population (2020) • Voting age: 178,599; 142,138
- Website: Official website
- Notes: West-central Wisconsin

The 24th Senate district of Wisconsin is one of 33 districts in the Wisconsin Senate. Located in west-central Wisconsin, the district comprises all of Jackson County, most of Juneau County, most of northern Adams County, eastern and northern Monroe County, southern Wood County, and central and southwest Portage County. It contains the cities of Black River Falls, Stevens Point, Tomah, and Wisconsin Rapids, and the U.S. Army base Fort McCoy.

== Current elected officials ==
Patrick Testin is the senator representing the 24th district, and is the current President pro tempore of the Wisconsin Senate. He was first elected in the 2016 general election and is now in his second four-year term.

Each Wisconsin State Senate district is composed of three Wisconsin State Assembly districts. The 24th Senate district comprises the 70th, 71st, and 72nd Assembly districts. The current representatives of those districts are:

- Assembly District 70: Nancy VanderMeer (R–Tomah)
- Assembly District 71: Vinnie Miresse (D–Stevens Point)
- Assembly District 72: Scott Krug (R–Rome)

The 24th Senate district crosses two congressional districts. The portion of the district in eastern Jackson County, northeast Monroe County, northern Juneau County, and western Wood County fall within Wisconsin's 7th congressional district, which is represented by U.S. Representative Tom Tiffany; the remainder of the district fall within Wisconsin's 3rd congressional district, which is represented by U.S. Representative Derrick Van Orden.

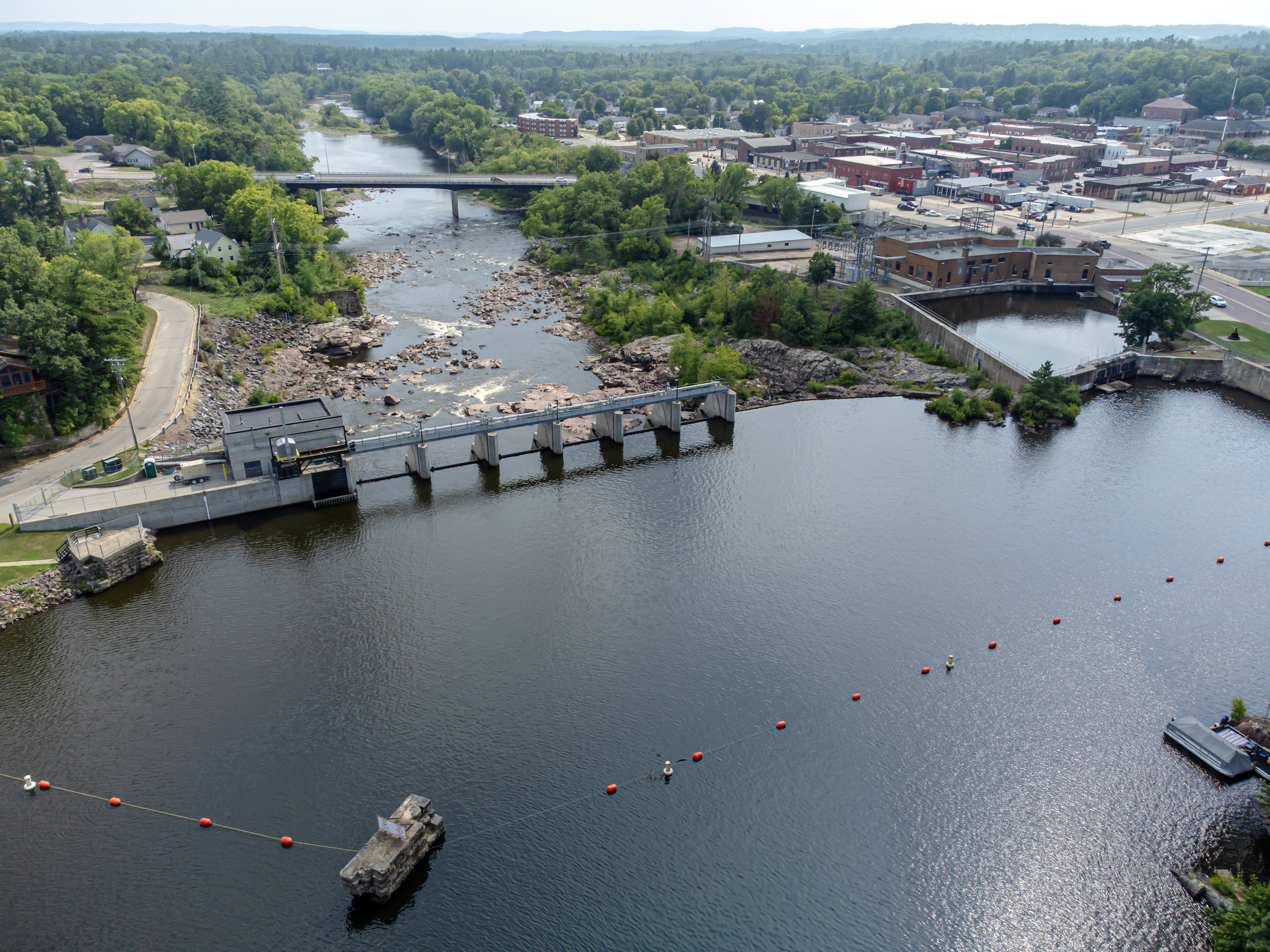
Dam and hydro plant at Black River Falls

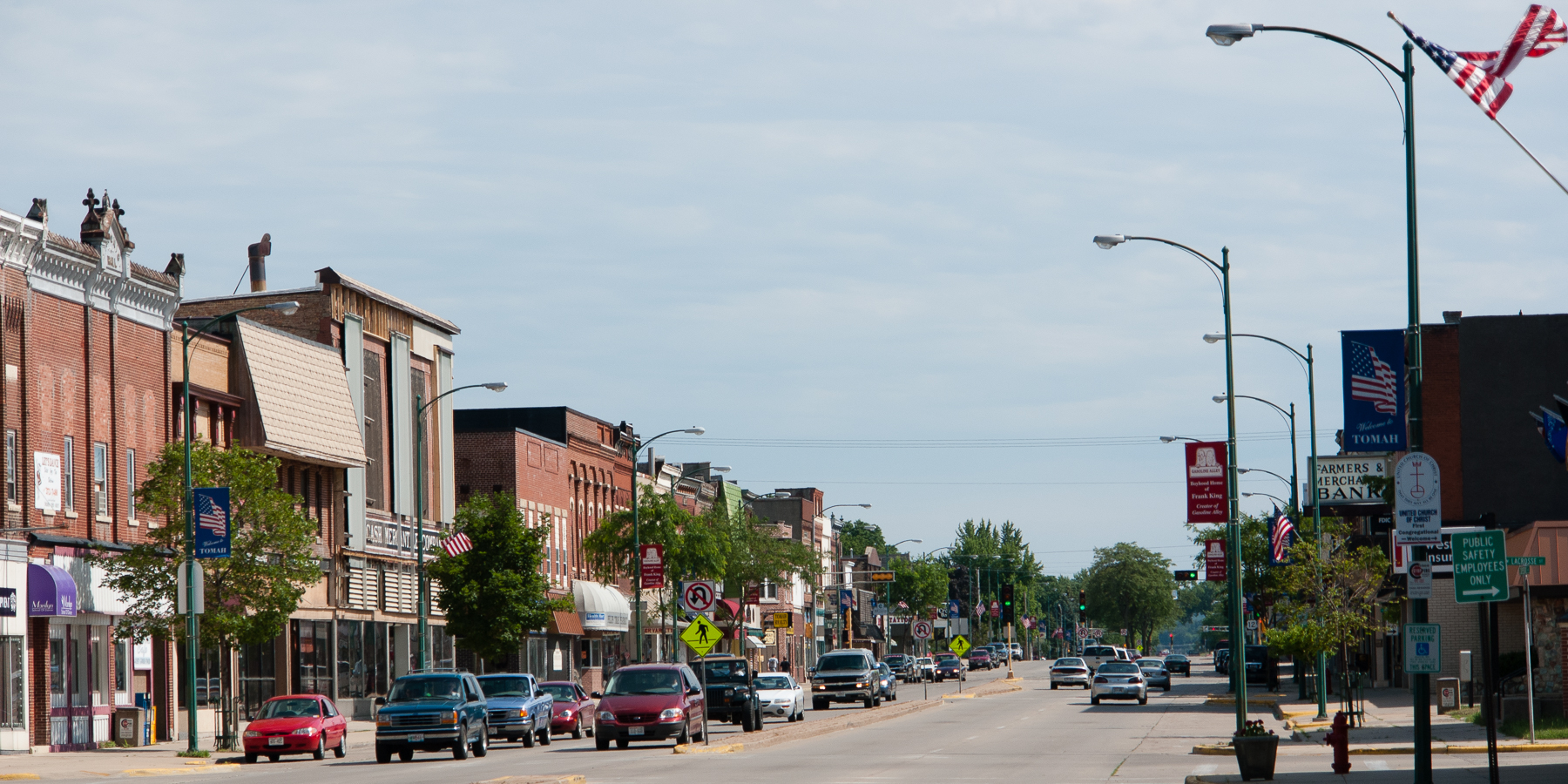
Downtown Tomah

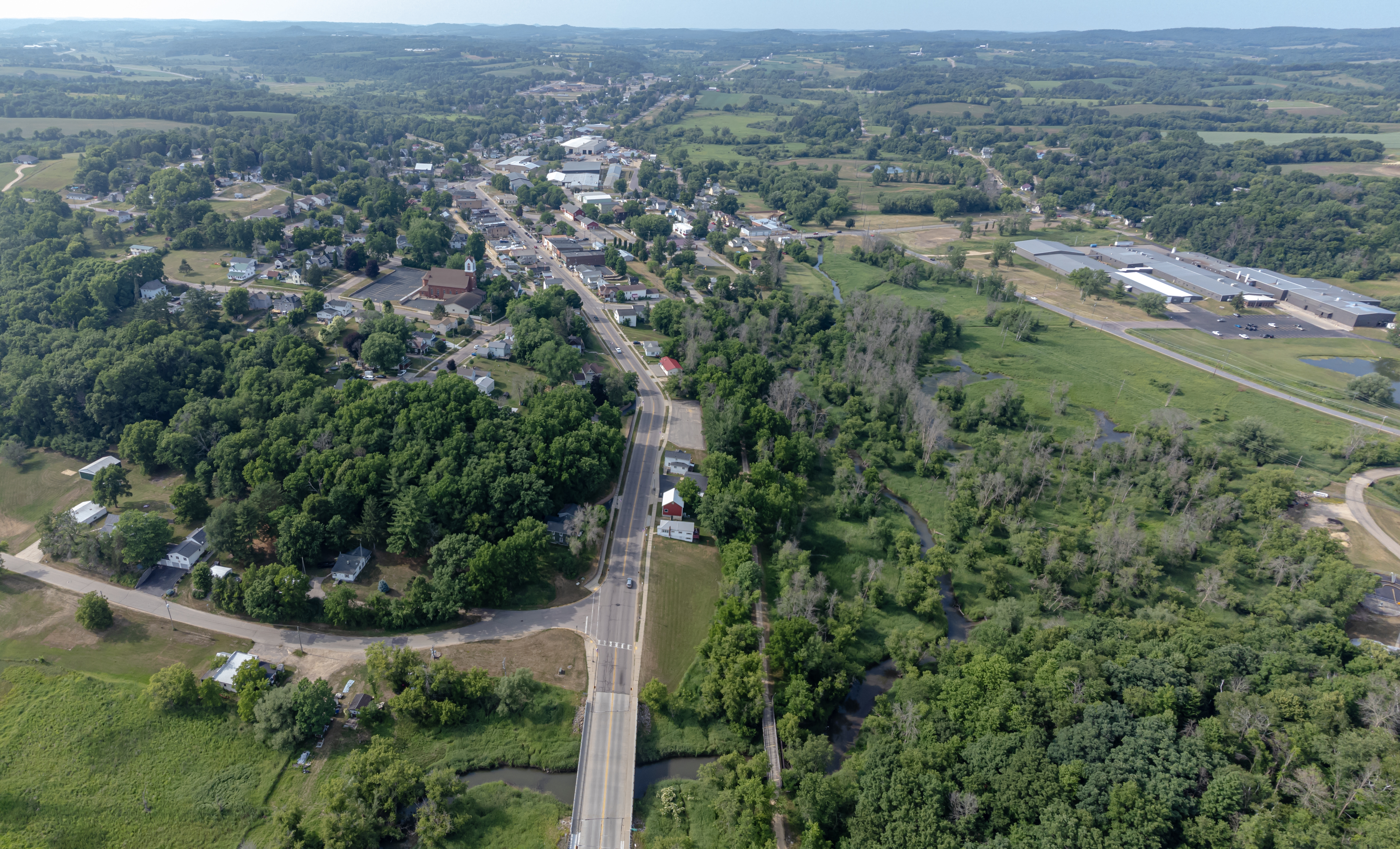
Elroy, Wisconsin

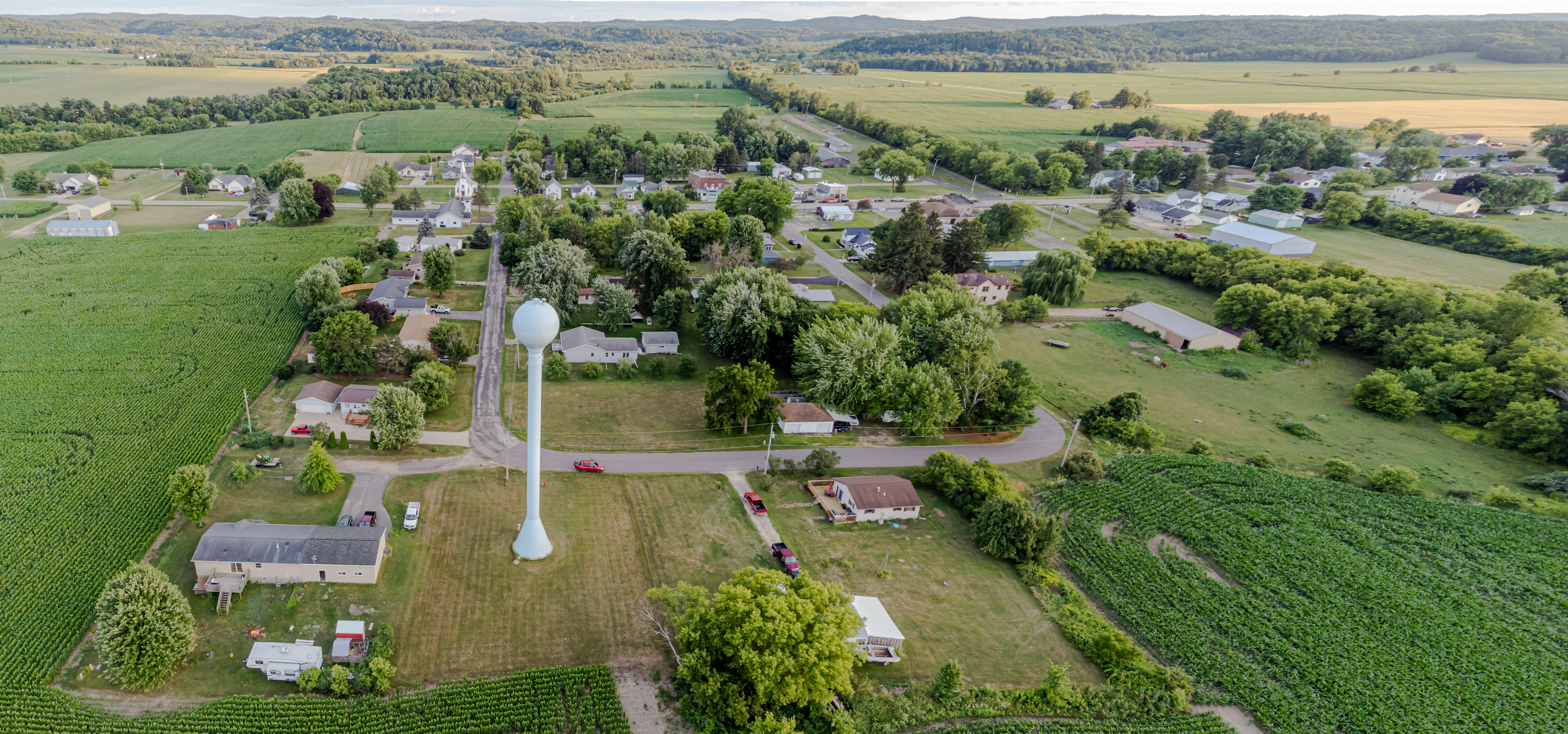
Hustler, Wisconsin

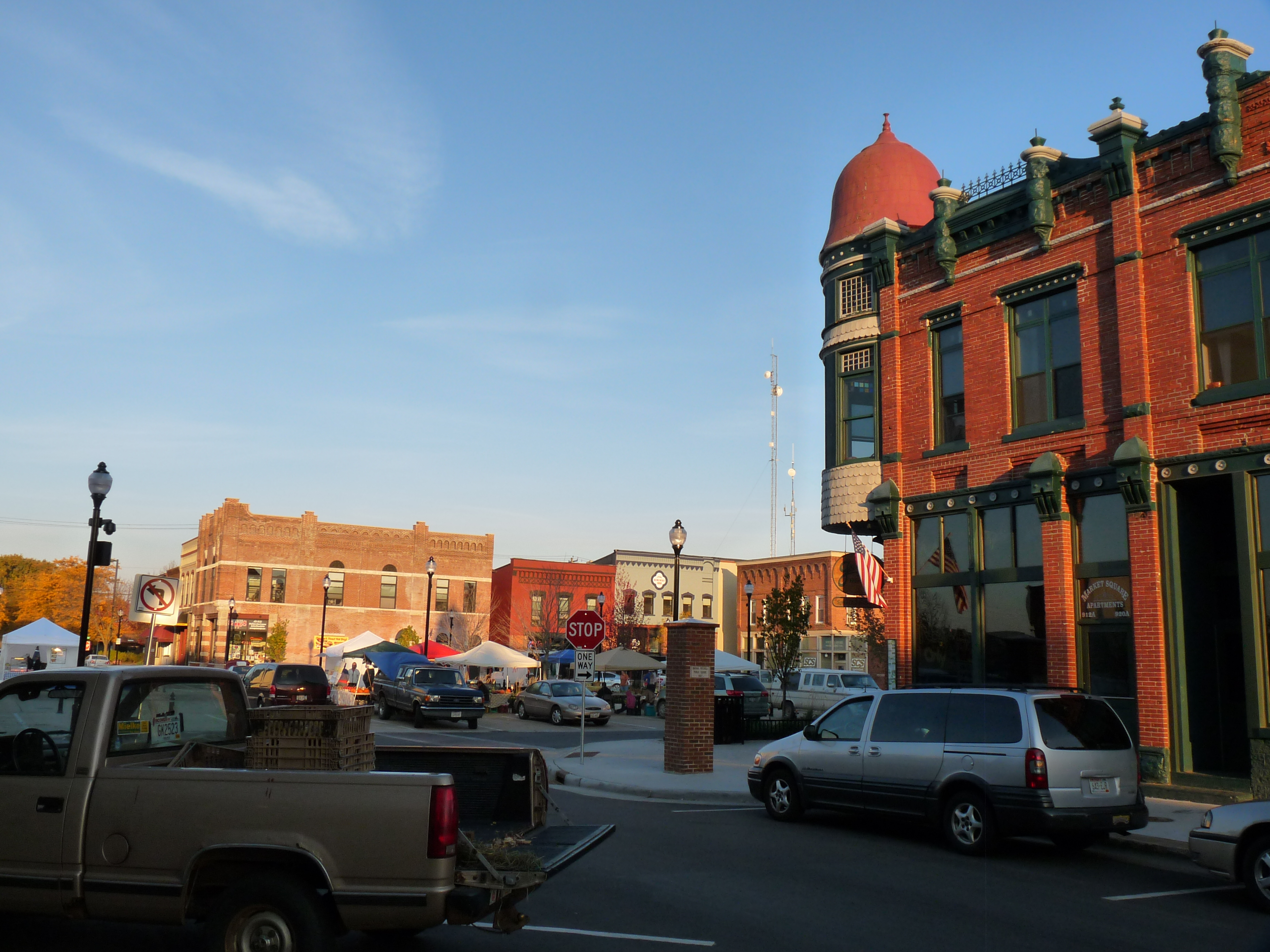
Matthias Mitchell public square in downtown Stevens Point

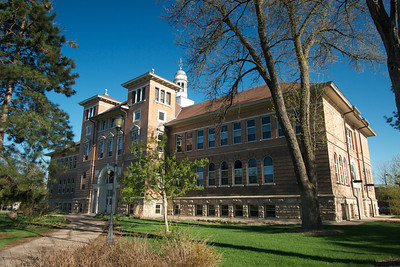
Old Main building on the University of Wisconsin–Stevens Point campus

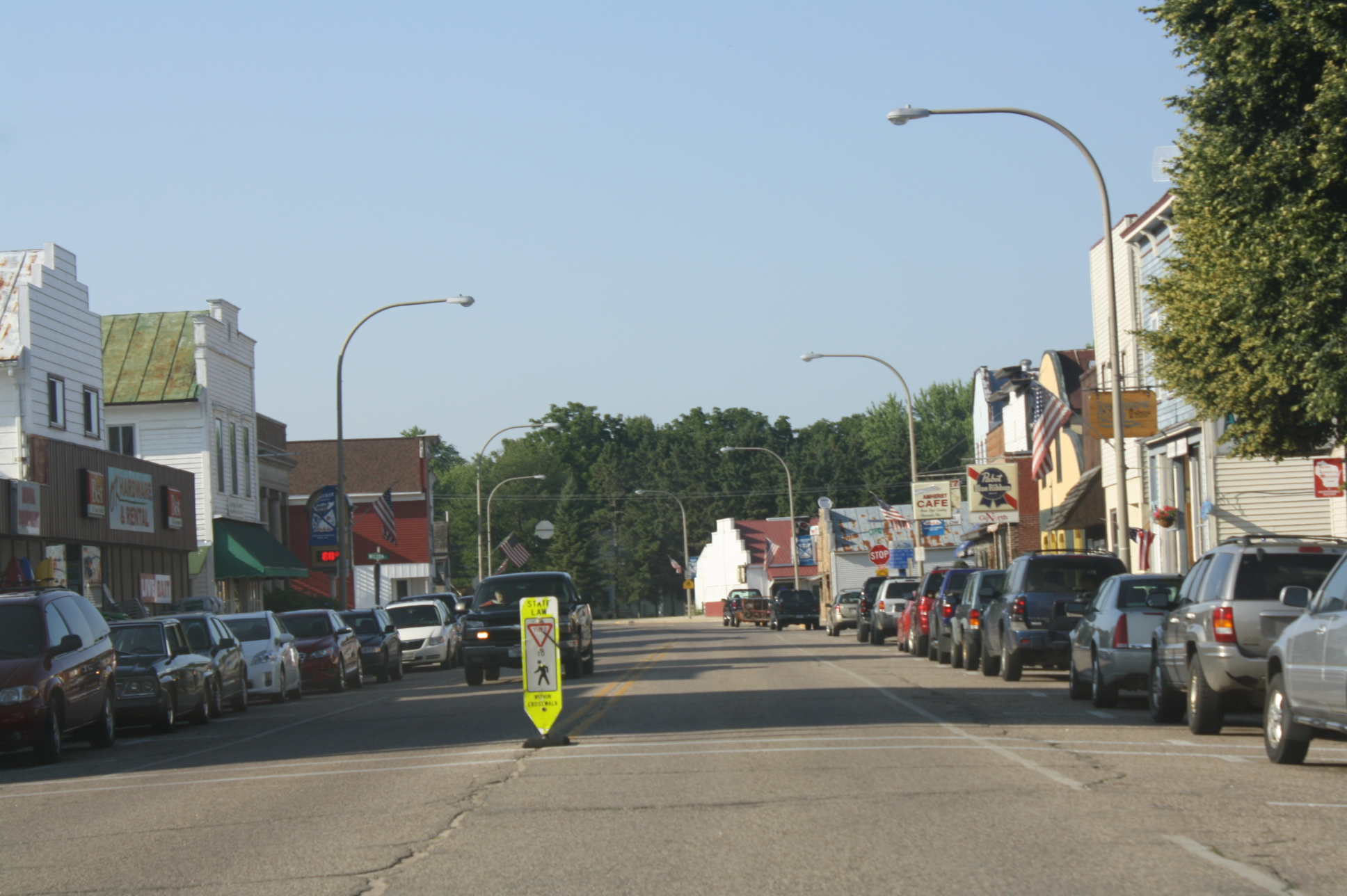
Amherst, Wisconsin

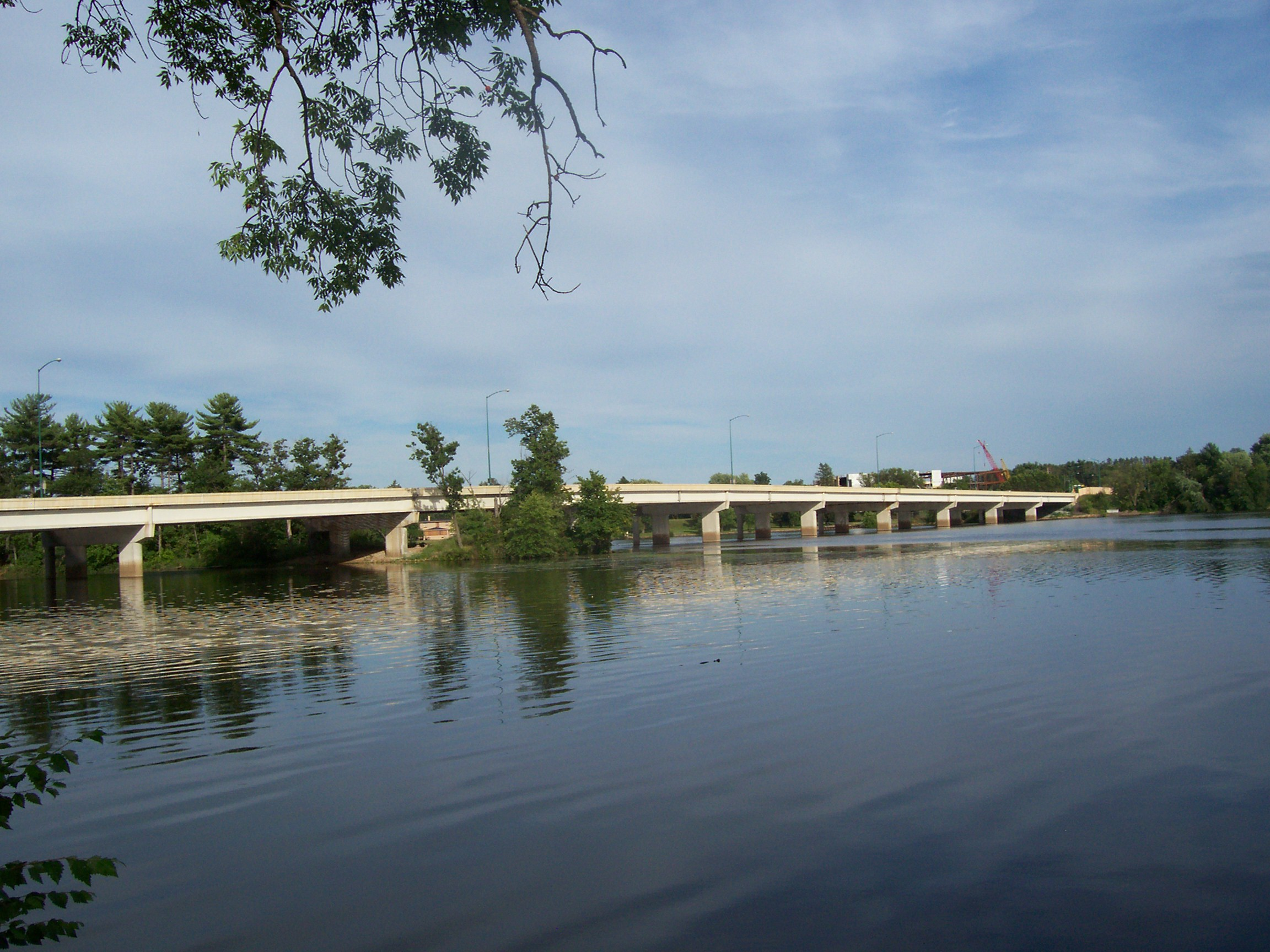
Bridge over the Wisconsin River at Wisconsin Rapids

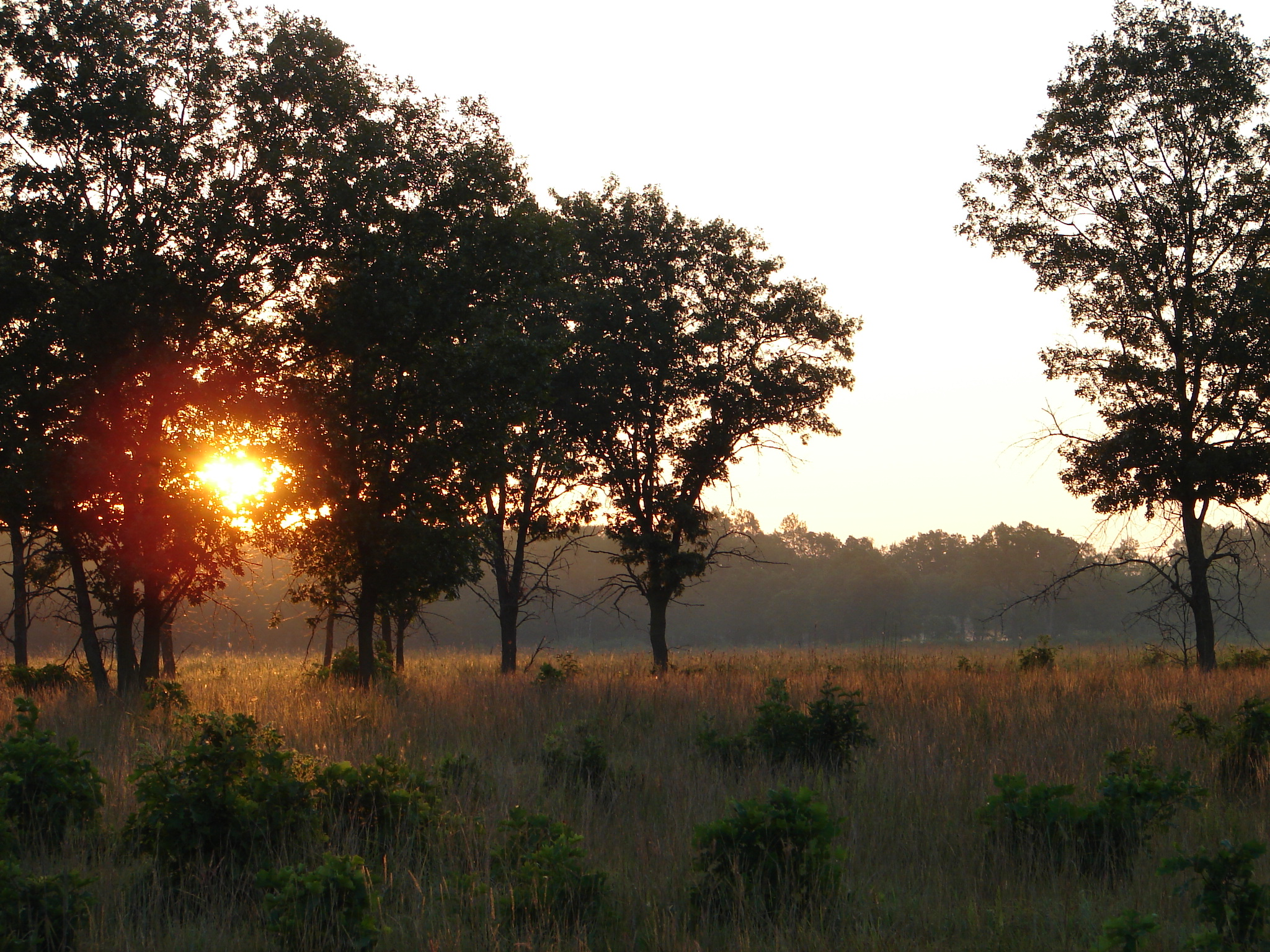
Necedah National Wildlife Refuge

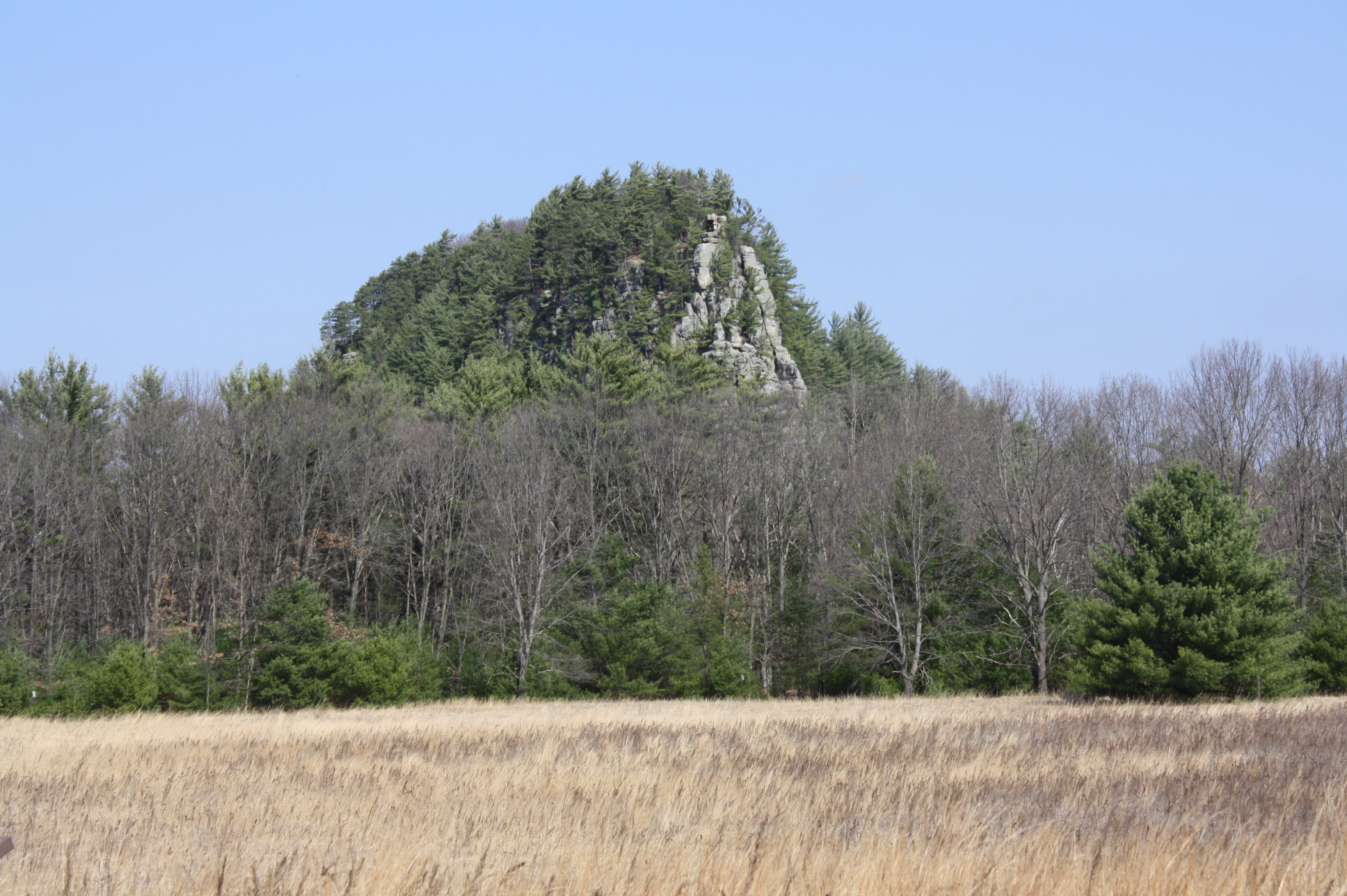
Roche-a-Cri State Park

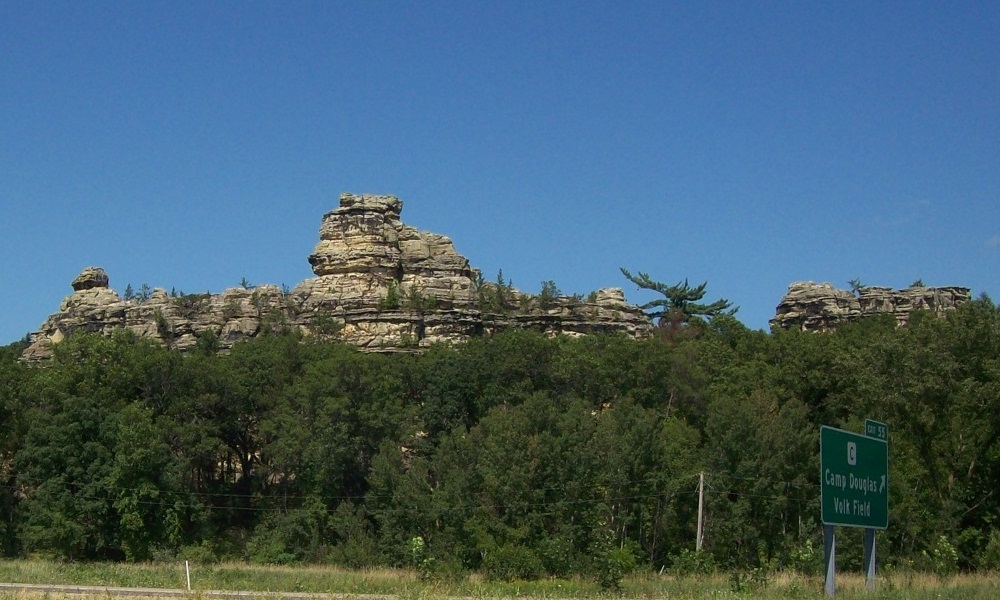
Castle Rock near Camp Douglas

== Past senators ==
Previous senators include:

Note: the boundaries of districts have changed repeatedly over history. Previous politicians of a specific numbered district have represented a completely different geographic area, due to redistricting.

| Senator | Party | Notes | Session | Years | District Definition |
|---|---|---|---|---|---|
| District created by 1852 Wisc. Act 499. | | | | 1852 | WI Senate District 24, 1853-1862 Green County |
| Thomas Bowen | Dem. | Redistricted from the 8th district. | 6th | 1853 | WI Senate District 24, 1853-1862 Green County |
| Francis H. West | Dem. | | 7th | 1854 | WI Senate District 24, 1853-1862 Green County |
| Francis H. West | Rep. | | 8th | 1855 | WI Senate District 24, 1853-1862 Green County |
| George E. Dexter | Rep. | | 9th | 1856 | WI Senate District 24, 1853-1862 Green County |
| George E. Dexter | Rep. | | 10th | 1857 | WI Senate District 24, 1853-1862 Green County |
| John H. Warren | Rep. | | 11th | 1858 | WI Senate District 24, 1853-1862 Green County |
| John H. Warren | Rep. | | 12th | 1859 | WI Senate District 24, 1853-1862 Green County |
| John W. Stewart | Rep. | | 13th | 1860 | WI Senate District 24, 1853-1862 Green County |
| John W. Stewart | Rep. | | 14th | 1861 | WI Senate District 24, 1853-1862 Green County |
| Edmund A. West | Rep. | | 15th | 1862 | WI Senate District 24, 1853-1862 Green County |
| Edmund A. West | Rep. | | 16th | 1863 | WI Senate District 24, 1853-1862 Green County |
| Walter S. Wescott | Natl. Union | | 17th | 1864 | WI Senate District 24, 1853-1862 Green County |
| Walter S. Wescott | Natl. Union | | 18th | 1865 | WI Senate District 24, 1853-1862 Green County |
| Henry Adams | Natl. Union | | 19th | 1866 | WI Senate District 24, 1853-1862 Green County |
| Henry Adams | Natl. Union | | 20th | 1867 | WI Senate District 24, 1853-1862 Green County |
| Henry Adams | Rep. | | 21st | 1868 | WI Senate District 24, 1853-1862 Green County |
| Henry Adams | Rep. | | 22nd | 1869 | WI Senate District 24, 1853-1862 Green County |
| John C. Hall | Rep. | | 23rd | 1870 | WI Senate District 24, 1853-1862 Green County |
| John C. Hall | Rep. | | 24th | 1871 | WI Senate District 24, 1853-1862 Green County |
| Joseph E. Irish | Rep. | | 25th | 1872 | Ashland, Barron, Bayfield, Burnett, Douglas, Pierce, Polk, and St. Croix counties |
| Joseph E. Irish | Rep. | | 26th | 1873 | Ashland, Barron, Bayfield, Burnett, Douglas, Pierce, Polk, and St. Croix counties |
| Henry D. Barron | Rep. | Resigned Dec. 1876 after elected Wisconsin circuit court judge. | 27th | 1874 | Ashland, Barron, Bayfield, Burnett, Douglas, Pierce, Polk, and St. Croix counties |
| Henry D. Barron | Rep. | Resigned Dec. 1876 after elected Wisconsin circuit court judge. | 28th | 1875 | Ashland, Barron, Bayfield, Burnett, Douglas, Pierce, Polk, and St. Croix counties |
| Henry D. Barron | Rep. | Resigned Dec. 1876 after elected Wisconsin circuit court judge. | 29th | 1876 | Ashland, Barron, Bayfield, Burnett, Douglas, Pierce, Polk, and St. Croix counties |
| Sam Fifield | Rep. | Won 1876 special election. | 30th | 1877 | Ashland, Barron, Bayfield, Burnett, Douglas, Polk, and St. Croix counties 1875 population: 29,389; 1880 population: 41,915 |
| Dana Reed Bailey | Rep. | | 31st | 1878 | Ashland, Barron, Bayfield, Burnett, Douglas, Polk, and St. Croix counties 1875 population: 29,389; 1880 population: 41,915 |
| Dana Reed Bailey | Rep. | | 32nd | 1879 | Ashland, Barron, Bayfield, Burnett, Douglas, Polk, and St. Croix counties 1875 population: 29,389; 1880 population: 41,915 |
| Sam Fifield | Rep. | | 33rd | 1880 | Ashland, Barron, Bayfield, Burnett, Douglas, Polk, and St. Croix counties 1875 population: 29,389; 1880 population: 41,915 |
| Sam Fifield | Rep. | | 34th | 1881 | Ashland, Barron, Bayfield, Burnett, Douglas, Polk, and St. Croix counties 1875 population: 29,389; 1880 population: 41,915 |
| James Hill | Rep. | | 35th | 1882 | Ashland, Barron, Bayfield, Burnett, Douglas, Polk, and St. Croix counties 1875 population: 29,389; 1880 population: 41,915 |
| James Hill | Rep. | | 36th | 1883–1884 | Barron, Bayfield, Burnett, Douglas, Polk, St. Croix, and Washburn counties 1880 population: 40,856 |
| Joel F. Nason | Rep. | | 37th | 1885–1886 | Barron, Bayfield, Burnett, Douglas, Polk, St. Croix, and Washburn counties 1880 population: 40,856 |
| Joel F. Nason | Rep. | | 38th | 1887–1888 | Barron, Bayfield, Burnett, Douglas, Polk, Sawyer, and Washburn counties 1885 population: 41,321 |
| Charles S. Taylor | Rep. | | 39th | 1889–1890 | Barron, Bayfield, Burnett, Douglas, Polk, Sawyer, and Washburn counties 1885 population: 41,321 |
| Charles S. Taylor | Rep. | | 40th | 1891–1892 | Barron, Bayfield, Burnett, Douglas, Polk, Sawyer, and Washburn counties 1885 population: 41,321 |
| Thompson Weeks | Rep. | | 41st | 1893–1894 | Walworth County and eastern Rock County |
| Thompson Weeks | Rep. | | 42nd | 1895–1896 | Walworth County and eastern Rock County |
| John W. Whelan | Rep. | | 43rd | 1897–1898 | Buffalo, Eau Claire, and Pepin counties 1895 population: 57,670; 1900 population: 56,362 |
| John W. Whelan | Rep. | | 44th | 1899–1900 | Buffalo, Eau Claire, and Pepin counties 1895 population: 57,670; 1900 population: 56,362 |
| Frank McDonough | Rep. | | 45th | 1901–1902 | Buffalo, Eau Claire, and Pepin counties 1895 population: 57,670; 1900 population: 56,362 |
| Frank McDonough | Rep. | | 46th | 1903–1904 | Chippewa, Eau Claire, and Gates counties 1900 population: 64,729 |
| James H. Noble | Rep. | | 47th | 1905–1906 | Chippewa, Eau Claire, and Gates counties 1900 population: 64,729 |
| James H. Noble | Rep. | | 48th | 1907–1908 | Chippewa, Eau Claire, and Gates counties 1900 population: 64,729 |
| John W. Thomas | Rep. | | 49th | 1909–1910 | Chippewa, Eau Claire, and Gates counties 1900 population: 64,729 |
| John W. Thomas | Rep. | | 50th | 1911–1912 | Chippewa, Eau Claire, and Gates counties 1900 population: 64,729 |
| Robert W. Monk | Rep. | | 51st | 1913–1914 | Clark and Wood counties 1910 population: 60,657 |
| Robert W. Monk | Rep. | | 52nd | 1915–1916 | Clark and Wood counties 1910 population: 60,657 |
| Isaac P. Witter | Rep. | | 53rd | 1917–1918 | Clark and Wood counties 1910 population: 60,657 |
| Isaac P. Witter | Rep. | | 54th | 1919–1920 | Clark and Wood counties 1910 population: 60,657 |
| William L. Smith | Rep. | | 55th | 1921–1922 | Clark and Wood counties 1910 population: 60,657 |
| William L. Smith | Rep. | | 56th | 1923–1924 | Clark, Taylor, and Wood counties |
| William L. Smith | Rep. | | 57th | 1925–1926 | Clark, Taylor, and Wood counties |
| William L. Smith | Rep. | | 58th | 1927–1928 | Clark, Taylor, and Wood counties |
| Walter J. Rush | Rep. | | 59th | 1929–1930 | Clark, Taylor, and Wood counties |
| Walter J. Rush | Rep. | | 60th | 1931–1932 | Clark, Taylor, and Wood counties |
| Walter J. Rush | Rep. | | 61st | 1933–1934 | Clark, Taylor, and Wood counties |
| Walter J. Rush | Rep. | | 62nd | 1935–1936 | Clark, Taylor, and Wood counties |
| Walter J. Rush | Prog. | | 63rd | 1937–1938 | Clark, Taylor, and Wood counties |
| Walter J. Rush | Prog. | | 64th | 1939–1940 | Clark, Taylor, and Wood counties |
| Melvin R. Laird | Rep. | Died March 1946. | 65th | 1941–1942 | Clark, Taylor, and Wood counties |
| Melvin R. Laird | Rep. | Died March 1946. | 66th | 1943–1944 | Clark, Taylor, and Wood counties |
| Melvin R. Laird | Rep. | Died March 1946. | 67th | 1945–1946 | Clark, Taylor, and Wood counties |
| --Vacant-- | | | 67th | 1945–1946 | Clark, Taylor, and Wood counties |
| Melvin R. Laird Jr. | Rep. | Won 1946 special election. Re-elected 1948. Elected to U.S. House in 1952. | 68th | 1947–1948 | Clark, Taylor, and Wood counties |
| Melvin R. Laird Jr. | Rep. | Won 1946 special election. Re-elected 1948. Elected to U.S. House in 1952. | 69th | 1949–1950 | Clark, Taylor, and Wood counties |
| Melvin R. Laird Jr. | Rep. | Won 1946 special election. Re-elected 1948. Elected to U.S. House in 1952. | 70th | 1951–1952 | Clark, Taylor, and Wood counties |
| William W. Clark | Rep. | | 71st | 1953–1954 | Clark, Taylor, and Wood counties |
| William W. Clark | Rep. | | 72nd | 1955–1956 | Clark, Portage, and Wood counties |
| William W. Clark | Rep. | | 73rd | 1957–1958 | Clark, Portage, and Wood counties |
| William W. Clark | Rep. | | 74th | 1959–1960 | Clark, Portage, and Wood counties |
| John M. Potter | Rep. | | 75th | 1961–1962 | Clark, Portage, and Wood counties |
| John M. Potter | Rep. | | 76th | 1963–1964 | Clark, Portage, and Wood counties |
| William C. Hansen | Dem. | | 77th | 1965–1966 | Green Lake, Portage, Waushara, and Wood counties |
| William C. Hansen | Dem. | | 78th | 1967–1968 | Green Lake, Portage, Waushara, and Wood counties |
| Raymond F. Heinzen | Rep. | | 79th | 1969–1970 | Green Lake, Portage, Waushara, and Wood counties |
| Raymond F. Heinzen | Rep. | | 80th | 1971–1972 | Green Lake, Portage, Waushara, and Wood counties |
| William A. Bablitch | Dem. | Resigned July 1983 after election to Wisconsin Supreme Court. | 81st | 1973–1974 | Portage and Green Lake counties, and Most of Waushara County; Northern Wood County; Southern Marathon County; Eastern Clark County; Part of Fond du Lac County; Part of Dodge County; Part of Winnebago County |
| William A. Bablitch | Dem. | Resigned July 1983 after election to Wisconsin Supreme Court. | 82nd | 1975–1976 | Portage and Green Lake counties, and Most of Waushara County; Northern Wood County; Southern Marathon County; Eastern Clark County; Part of Fond du Lac County; Part of Dodge County; Part of Winnebago County |
| William A. Bablitch | Dem. | Resigned July 1983 after election to Wisconsin Supreme Court. | 83rd | 1977–1978 | Portage and Green Lake counties, and Most of Waushara County; Northern Wood County; Southern Marathon County; Eastern Clark County; Part of Fond du Lac County; Part of Dodge County; Part of Winnebago County |
| William A. Bablitch | Dem. | Resigned July 1983 after election to Wisconsin Supreme Court. | 84th | 1979–1980 | Portage and Green Lake counties, and Most of Waushara County; Northern Wood County; Southern Marathon County; Eastern Clark County; Part of Fond du Lac County; Part of Dodge County; Part of Winnebago County |
| William A. Bablitch | Dem. | Resigned July 1983 after election to Wisconsin Supreme Court. | 85th | 1981–1982 | Portage and Green Lake counties, and Most of Waushara County; Northern Wood County; Southern Marathon County; Eastern Clark County; Part of Fond du Lac County; Part of Dodge County; Part of Winnebago County |
| William A. Bablitch | Dem. | Resigned July 1983 after election to Wisconsin Supreme Court. | 86th | 1983–1984 | Portage and Wood counties, and Western Waupaca County; Part of Marathon County |
| David Helbach | Dem. | Won 1983 special election. Resigned Feb. 1995. | 86th | 1983–1984 | Portage and Wood counties, and Western Waupaca County; Part of Marathon County |
| David Helbach | Dem. | Won 1983 special election. Resigned Feb. 1995. | 87th | 1985–1986 | Portage and Wood counties, and Northwest Adams County; Part of Waupaca County; Part of Marathon County |
| David Helbach | Dem. | Won 1983 special election. Resigned Feb. 1995. | 88th | 1987–1988 | Portage and Wood counties, and Northwest Adams County; Part of Waupaca County; Part of Marathon County |
| David Helbach | Dem. | Won 1983 special election. Resigned Feb. 1995. | 89th | 1989–1990 | Portage and Wood counties, and Northwest Adams County; Part of Waupaca County; Part of Marathon County |
| David Helbach | Dem. | Won 1983 special election. Resigned Feb. 1995. | 90th | 1991–1992 | Portage and Wood counties, and Northwest Adams County; Part of Waupaca County; Part of Marathon County |
| David Helbach | Dem. | Won 1983 special election. Resigned Feb. 1995. | 91st | 1993–1994 | Most of Adams County; Most of Portage County; Most of Wood County Part of Waushara County: Town of Oasis; Town of Plainfield; Town of Rose; Village of Plainfield |
| David Helbach | Dem. | Won 1983 special election. Resigned Feb. 1995. | 92nd | 1995–1996 | Most of Adams County; Most of Portage County; Most of Wood County Part of Waushara County: Town of Oasis; Town of Plainfield; Town of Rose; Village of Plainfield |
| Kevin Shibilski | Dem. | Won 1995 special election. Resigned Dec. 2002. | 92nd | 1995–1996 | Most of Adams County; Most of Portage County; Most of Wood County Part of Waushara County: Town of Oasis; Town of Plainfield; Town of Rose; Village of Plainfield |
| Kevin Shibilski | Dem. | Won 1995 special election. Resigned Dec. 2002. | 93rd | 1997–1998 | Most of Adams County; Most of Portage County; Most of Wood County Part of Waushara County: Town of Oasis; Town of Plainfield; Town of Rose; Village of Plainfield |
| Kevin Shibilski | Dem. | Won 1995 special election. Resigned Dec. 2002. | 94th | 1999–2000 | Most of Adams County; Most of Portage County; Most of Wood County Part of Waushara County: Town of Oasis; Town of Plainfield; Town of Rose; Village of Plainfield |
| Kevin Shibilski | Dem. | Won 1995 special election. Resigned Dec. 2002. | 95th | 2001–2002 | Most of Adams County; Most of Portage County; Most of Wood County Part of Waushara County: Town of Oasis; Town of Plainfield; Town of Rose; Village of Plainfield |
| --Vacant-- | | | 96th | 2003–2004 | Most of Adams County; Most of Portage County; Most of Wood County Part of Marathon County: City of Marshfield; Part of Waushara County: Town of Deerfield; Town of Hancock; Town of Oasis; Town of Plainfield; Town of Rose; Village of Hancock; Village of Plainfield; Part of Marquette County: Town of Springfield; Village of Westfield |
| Julie Lassa | Dem. | Won 2003 special election. | 96th | 2003–2004 | Most of Adams County; Most of Portage County; Most of Wood County Part of Marathon County: City of Marshfield; Part of Waushara County: Town of Deerfield; Town of Hancock; Town of Oasis; Town of Plainfield; Town of Rose; Village of Hancock; Village of Plainfield; Part of Marquette County: Town of Springfield; Village of Westfield |
| Julie Lassa | Dem. | Won 2003 special election. | 97th | 2005–2006 | Most of Adams County; Most of Portage County; Most of Wood County Part of Marathon County: City of Marshfield; Part of Waushara County: Town of Deerfield; Town of Hancock; Town of Oasis; Town of Plainfield; Town of Rose; Village of Hancock; Village of Plainfield; Part of Marquette County: Town of Springfield; Village of Westfield |
| Julie Lassa | Dem. | Won 2003 special election. | 98th | 2007–2008 | Most of Adams County; Most of Portage County; Most of Wood County Part of Marathon County: City of Marshfield; Part of Waushara County: Town of Deerfield; Town of Hancock; Town of Oasis; Town of Plainfield; Town of Rose; Village of Hancock; Village of Plainfield; Part of Marquette County: Town of Springfield; Village of Westfield |
| Julie Lassa | Dem. | Won 2003 special election. | 99th | 2009–2010 | Most of Adams County; Most of Portage County; Most of Wood County Part of Marathon County: City of Marshfield; Part of Waushara County: Town of Deerfield; Town of Hancock; Town of Oasis; Town of Plainfield; Town of Rose; Village of Hancock; Village of Plainfield; Part of Marquette County: Town of Springfield; Village of Westfield |
| Julie Lassa | Dem. | Won 2003 special election. | 100th | 2011–2012 | Most of Adams County; Most of Portage County; Most of Wood County Part of Marathon County: City of Marshfield; Part of Waushara County: Town of Deerfield; Town of Hancock; Town of Oasis; Town of Plainfield; Town of Rose; Village of Hancock; Village of Plainfield; Part of Marquette County: Town of Springfield; Village of Westfield |
| Julie Lassa | Dem. | Won 2003 special election. | 101st | 2013–2014 | Portage County and Most of Wood County; Northern Adams County; Western Waushara County; Eastern Jackson County; Northern Monroe County |
| Julie Lassa | Dem. | Won 2003 special election. | 102nd | 2015–2016 | Portage County and Most of Wood County; Northern Adams County; Western Waushara County; Eastern Jackson County; Northern Monroe County |
| Patrick Testin | Rep. | | 103rd | 2017–2018 | Portage County and Most of Wood County; Northern Adams County; Western Waushara County; Eastern Jackson County; Northern Monroe County |
| Patrick Testin | Rep. | | 104th | 2019–2020 | Portage County and Most of Wood County; Northern Adams County; Western Waushara County; Eastern Jackson County; Northern Monroe County |
| Patrick Testin | Rep. | | 105th | 2021–2022 | Portage County and Most of Wood County; Northern Adams County; Western Waushara County; Eastern Jackson County; Northern Monroe County |
| Patrick Testin | Rep. | | 106th | 2023–2024 | Portage County and northern Adams County, eastern Jackson County, northeast La Crosse County, northern Monroe County, western Waushara County, most of Wood County |
| Patrick Testin | Rep. | | 107th | 2025–2026 | |
