= Joel F. Nason =

19th century American politician

Member of the Wisconsin Senate from the 24th district
- In office January 5, 1885 – January 7, 1889
- Preceded by: James Hill
- Succeeded by: Charles Simeon Taylor

County Clerk of Polk County, Wisconsin
- In office January 5, 1866 – January 1, 1872
- Preceded by: Charles H. Staples
- Succeeded by: William J. Vincent

Personal details
- Born: August 31, 1827 Crawford, Maine, U.S.
- Died: December 3, 1908 (aged 81) Osceola, Wisconsin, U.S.
- Resting place: Ramsey Cemetery, Osceola, Wisconsin
- Party: Republican
- Spouses: Bethiah Hanscom (died 1862); Mary Ann Godfrey (died 1885); Fannie Field (m. 1887–1908)
- Children: at least 7
- Occupation: Farmer

Joel Foster Nason (August 31, 1827 – December 3, 1908) was an American farmer, Republican politician, and Wisconsin pioneer. He was a member of the Wisconsin State Senate, representing the northwest corner of the state in the 1885 and 1887 sessions.

== Biography ==
Joel Nason was born on August 31, 1827, in Crawford, Maine. He had little education in his early years, but attended an academy in Monson, Maine, and worked as a teacher before moving to the west.

He came to Wisconsin in April 1850 and settled at St. Croix Falls where he initially worked as a lumberman before cultivating a farm. He served as a county commissioner from 1861 to 1863, and was elected county clerk in 1865, 1867, and 1869. He was appointed receiver at the United States General Land Office in St. Croix Falls in 1871, and was re-appointed in 1875, 1879, and 1883.

In 1884, he was elected to the Wisconsin State Senate running on the Republican Party ticket. He represented the 24th State Senate district, which then-comprised most of northwestern Wisconsin—Barron, Bayfield, Burnett, Douglas, Polk, St. Croix, and Washburn counties—and served in the 1885 and 1887 sessions of the Legislature.

He died in 1908 at Osceola, Wisconsin.

== Electoral history ==
=== Wisconsin Senate (1884) ===
Wisconsin Senate, 24th District Election, 1884
Party	Candidate	Votes	%	±%
General Election, November 8, 1884
Republican	Joel F. Nason	5,785	61.37%	−2.77%
Democratic	Reuben F. Little	3,641	38.63%	
Plurality		2,144	22.75%	-5.54%
Total votes		9,426	100.0%	+47.86%
Republican hold				

Wisconsin Senate
Preceded by James Hill	Member of the Wisconsin Senate from the 24th district January 5, 1885 – January 7, 1889	Succeeded by Charles Simeon Taylor
Political offices
Preceded by Charles H. Staples	County Clerk of Polk County, Wisconsin; January 5, 1866 – January 1, 1872	Succeeded by William J. Vincent
