= Senator McDonough =

Senator McDonough may refer to:

- Frank McDonough (politician) (1846–1904), Wisconsin State Senate
- Peter McDonough (1925–1998), New Jersey State Senate
