= Senator Neal =

Senator Neal may refer to:

- Dina Neal (born 1972), Nevada State Senate
- George D. Neal (1853–1916), Texas State Senate
- Gerald Neal (born 1945), Kentucky State Senate
- Henry S. Neal (1828–1906), Ohio State Senate
- Jairus Edward Neal (1818–1882), Iowa State Senate
- Joe Neal (politician) (1935–2020), Nevada State Senate
- John R. Neal (1836–1889), Tennessee State Senate
- John Randolph Neal Jr. (1876–1959), Tennessee State Senate
- Margie Neal (1875–1971), Texas State Senate
- Pat Neal (born 1949), Florida State Senate
- Peter M. Neal (1811–1906), Massachusetts State Senate

== See also ==
- Oscar W. Neale (1873–1957), Wisconsin State Senate
- Robert R. Neall (born 1948), Maryland State Senate
- Marshall Allen Neill (1914–1979), Washington State Senate
