= George E. Dexter =

19th-century American politician

Court Commissioner of Fillmore County, Minnesota
- In office January 1, 1864 – January 1, 1870
- Preceded by: Position established
- Succeeded by: Reuben Wells

Member of the Wisconsin Senate from the 24th district
- In office January 7, 1856 – January 4, 1858
- Preceded by: Francis H. West
- Succeeded by: John Holden Warren

Personal details
- Born: July 26, 1823 New York, New York, U.S.
- Died: August 27, 1894 (aged 71) Charles City, Iowa, U.S.
- Resting place: Riverside Cemetery, Charles City, Iowa
- Party: Republican
- Spouses: Elizabeth Conkey (m. 1865; died 1876); Julietta Oakes (m. 1879–1894)
- Children: none
- Education: Hamilton College
- Profession: Lawyer

George Edward Dexter (July 26, 1823 – August 27, 1894) was an American lawyer, banker, politician, and pioneer of Wisconsin and Minnesota. He was a member of the Wisconsin Senate, representing Green County during the 1856 and 1857 sessions. He was one of dozens of lawmakers in the 1856 session caught up in the La Crosse and Milwaukee Railroad bribery scheme.

== Biography ==
George E. Dexter was born in New York City on July 26, 1823. He was sent to college preparatory school in Rome, New York, and then attended Hamilton College, graduating in 1843. After graduation, he studied law in the office of William M. Tallman in Rome. He was admitted to the bar in 1846, and worked as a junior partner to future-U.S. President Millard Fillmore in Buffalo, New York.

In 1849, he left New York and moved to Green County, in the southern part of the new state of Wisconsin. Shortly after arriving in the state, he became involved with the state's Whig Party organization. After the breakup of the Whig Party and the creation of the Republican Party, in 1854, Dexter became a member of the Republican Party of Wisconsin.

In 1855, he was the Republican nominee for Wisconsin Senate in the 24th State Senate district. At the time the district comprised just Green County. He won the fall election and was a member of the Republican Party's first majority in the Wisconsin Senate. He served a two-year term and was not a candidate for re-election in 1857.

During his time in the Legislature, dozens of Wisconsin officials were caught up in a bribery scheme, interested in granting certain lands for railroad development. The bribes were mostly given in the form of railroad company bonds or stock. During the investigation of the affair, Dexter was found to have received $10,000 worth of bonds—about $360,000 adjusted for inflation to 2023.

In 1863, he moved to Preston, Minnesota, where he was elected court commissioner of Fillmore County, Minnesota, effective January 1864. He served six years, leaving office in 1870.

He moved to Charles City, Iowa, in 1873, where he lived out the rest of his life.

== Personal life and family ==
George E. Dexter was the third son of Norman and Ruth (née Stanley) Dexter. Norman Dexter was a successful merchant and ship owner who operated a trade route between New York and South America. The Dexters trace their ancestry to Thomas Dexter, an English colonist who settled in the Massachusetts Bay Colony about 1630. On his mother's side, the Stanleys were descended from Thomas Stanley, who came to the Massachusetts Bay Colony in 1634.

George Dexter married twice. He married Elizabeth Conkey on February 5, 1865, at Preston, Minnesota. She had moved west to Minnesota with her family from Plattsburgh, New York. She died in 1876, and he then married Julietta Oakes, of Medina, Indiana, on March 3, 1879. Dexter had no surviving children from either marriage.

He was active in the Hamilton College alumni association, and was at one time president of the Western Alumni of Hamilton College.

George E. Dexter died August 27, 1894, suffering a heart attack after accidentally setting fire to his yard while burning garbage.

Wisconsin Senate
Preceded by Francis H. West	Member of the Wisconsin Senate from the 24th district January 7, 1856 – January 4, 1858	Succeeded by John Holden Warren
Legal offices
Office established	Court Commissioner of Fillmore County, Minnesota; January 1, 1864 – January 1, 1870	Succeeded by Reuben Wells
