= John M. Potter =

American politician

John M. Potter (1924–1993) was a member of the Wisconsin State Senate.

== Biography ==
Potter was born on August 16, 1924, in Wisconsin Rapids, Wisconsin. He attended school in Nekoosa, Wisconsin, and De Pere, Wisconsin, as well as the University of Michigan and what is now the University of Wisconsin-Madison. Potter lived in Port Edwards, Wisconsin, and died September 23, 1993.

== Career ==
Potter was a member of the Senate from the 24th District from 1961 to 1964. He succeeded William Walter Clark and was succeeded by William C. Hansen. From 1950 to 1957, he had been District Attorney of Wood County, Wisconsin. Additionally, he was a delegate to the 1964 Republican National Convention.
