= Arthur Lenroot Jr. =

20th centuryAmerican politician

Member of the Wisconsin Senate from the 11th district
- In office January 1947 – January 1955
- Preceded by: Elmer Peterson
- Succeeded by: Richard J. Zaborski

Member of the Wisconsin State Assembly from the Douglas 2nd district
- In office January 1943 – January 1947
- Preceded by: Elmer Peterson
- Succeeded by: Charles E. Nelson

Personal details
- Born: February 18, 1912 Superior, Wisconsin, U.S.
- Died: July 8, 1997 (aged 85) Santa Rosa, California, U.S.
- Resting place: Sunset Memorial Park Cemetery, Minneapolis
- Party: Republican
- Spouse: Ethel
- Relatives: Irvine Lenroot (uncle)

Arthur Alvin Lenroot Jr. (February 18, 1912 – July 8, 1997) was a Republican member of the Wisconsin Senate, representing the 11th district from 1947 to 1955. He was a nephew of Irvine Lenroot, who served as a United States senator and congressman from Wisconsin.

== Biography ==
He was born in Superior, Wisconsin, and went to University of St. Thomas and University of Wisconsin–Superior. He worked for a railroad and an oil company and was an abstractor and involved in conservation and the tourism industry. Lenroot also served in the Wisconsin State Assembly in 1942 and 1944 and was a delegate to the 1948 Republican National Convention. According to the Wisconsin Blue Book, he was elected in 1946 and re-elected in 1950, but was defeated in 1954 by Democrat Carl Lauri. He died in Santa Rosa, California.
