= William Walter Clark =

American politician (1885–1971)

William W. Clark
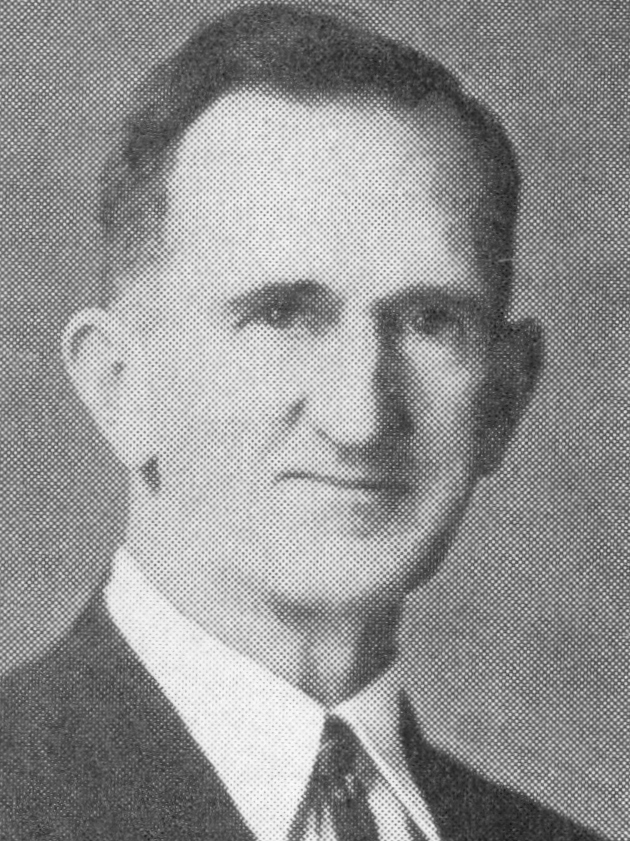
- Clark circa 1940

Member of the Wisconsin Senate from the 24th district
- In office January 5, 1953 – January 2, 1961
- Preceded by: Melvin R. Laird Jr.
- Succeeded by: John M. Potter

Member of the Wisconsin State Assembly from the Wood County district
- In office January 4, 1943 – January 5, 1953
- Preceded by: Chester A. Krohn
- Succeeded by: Donald E. Reiland
- In office January 2, 1939 – January 6, 1941
- Preceded by: Byrde M. Vaughan
- Succeeded by: Chester A. Krohn
- In office January 3, 1921 – January 1, 1923
- Preceded by: Byron Whittingham
- Succeeded by: Elwyn E. Royce

Personal details
- Born: July 7, 1885 Plum City, Wisconsin
- Died: May 15, 1971 (aged 85) Wood County, Wisconsin
- Resting place: Forest Hill Cemetery, Wisconsin Rapids, Wisconsin
- Party: Republican
- Spouse: Estella Lillian Junkman (m. 1909; died 1970)
- Children: Jack M. Clark^{(b. 1910; died 2002)}; Phyllis May (Ritchie)^{(b. 1918; died 2020)}; Robert D. Clark^{(b. 1923; died 2016)}
- Education: River Falls State Normal School
- Profession: Teacher, farmer, politician

William Walter Clark (July 7, 1885 – May 15, 1971) was an American educator, farmer, and Republican politician. He represented Wood County in the Wisconsin State Assembly for fourteen years, and was twice elected to the Wisconsin State Senate from the 24th Senate district.

== Biography ==
Clark was born on July 7, 1885, in Plum City, Wisconsin. After graduating from high school in Ellsworth, Wisconsin, he attended what are now the University of Wisconsin-River Falls and the University of Wisconsin-Madison. He married Estella Lillian Junkman. Clark died on May 15, 1971, and is buried in Wisconsin Rapids, Wisconsin.

== Career ==
Clark was a member of the Assembly three times. First, from 1921 to 1922, second, from 1939 to 1940 and third, from 1943 to 1952. During this time, he was a delegate to the 1948 Republican National Convention. Clark then went on to serve in the Senate from the 24th district from 1953 to 1960, at which time he was succeeded by John M. Potter. Additionally, he was Chairman of Hansen, Wisconsin, and of the Wood County Board.
