= Frances Hamerstrom =

American writer and ornithologist

Frances Hamerstrom (December 16, 1907 – August 29, 1998) was an American writer, naturalist and ornithologist known for her work with the greater prairie chicken in Wisconsin, and for her research on birds of prey. Hamerstrom was a prolific writer, publishing over 100 professional papers and 10 books on the prairie chicken, harriers, eagles, and other wildlife topics. Some were translated into German.

== Biography ==
Frances Flint was born in 1907 into a wealthy family in Boston, Massachusetts. As a youth, she attended Milton Academy. As a child Hamerstrom developed a fascination with the natural world. Despite her parents' complaints that such behavior was "unladylike", she kept wild pets, learned to hunt, and tended her own gardens. To keep her family from uncovering evidence of her wildlife adventures, she planted poison ivy along the path that led to where she kept her wilderness gear. (Hamerstrom was naturally immune to its effects).

Hamerstrom attended Smith College but proudly flunked out. She was uninterested in classes and felt she could learn more from the natural world than in a classroom.

She met her husband, Frederick Hamerstrom (also a naturalist at heart), at a dance. Shortly after, in 1931, they married in secret. Later they remarried in a ceremony in Massachusetts.

Hamerstrom and her husband wanted to work with wildlife, at a time when the modern wildlife management and research profession was in its infancy. After meeting wildlife conservationist and ecologist Aldo Leopold, the Hamerstroms went to Iowa State University to study under Paul Errington. In 1935, Frances earned her bachelor's degree from Iowa State University, where she also worked on the topic of predation and the food habits of the great horned owl.

After graduating, Frances and Frederick moved to Wisconsin to work at a wildlife refuge and to attend graduate school at the University of Wisconsin under Aldo Leopold. Frances was Leopold's only female graduate student. She earned her master's degree in wildlife management in 1940. During this time, the Hamerstroms both began their research on the imperiled greater prairie chicken, an endangered species in Wisconsin.

== Research ==
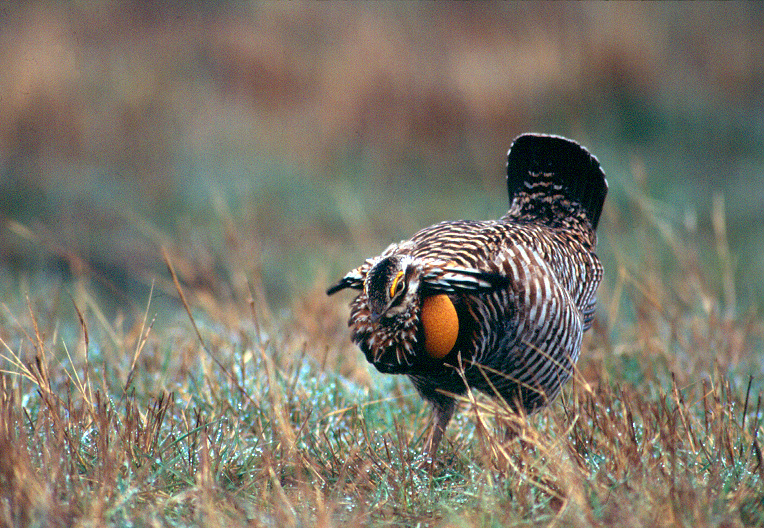
Greater prairie chicken

In 1949, Frances became the second woman to work as a wildlife professional in Wisconsin. The Hamerstroms both worked for the Department of Natural Resources in Wisconsin. Their lifetime study of the endangered prairie chicken, in a research area that included the Buena Vista and Leola Marshes, was their major contribution to the field. The Hamerstroms focused on the habitat needs of the greater prairie chicken. They developed and initiated a management plan based on their observation that the prairie chicken required a "checkerboard" pattern of habitat. Frances worked for the Department of Natural Resources for 23 years, and in 1970 the Hamerstroms were awarded with the National Wildlife Federation Award for Distinguished Service to Conservation for their innovative management plan and work with the prairie chickens.

The Hamerstroms helped focus public attention on the need for habitat preservation. In 1961 they helped form the "Society of Tympanuchus Cupido Pinnatus" (Latin term for prairie grouse) to purchase lands (a total of more than 2,000 acres) to be managed for the preservation and restoration of "native prairie grouse populations." Through her fund-raising campaigns, grasslands near their home sheltered more than 2,000 greater prairie chickens.

The Hamerstroms are credited by naturalists for saving the prairie chicken from extirpation in Wisconsin. Over the years, an estimated 7,000 wildlife observers (called "boomers") participated in the collection of necessary data for this project, with Frances playing host to all of them at her home.

The Hamerstroms also conducted a decades-long study of the northern harrier. She wrote Harrier: Hawk of the Marshes, published in 1986 by the Smithsonian Institution Press, with illustrations by her husband. It documented the relationship between the breeding success of harriers and the vole population, which constituted their cyclical food supply. Frances noted that the vole abundance determined the harriers' mating system, and documented her findings in a 1985 article "Effect of Voles on Mating Systems in a Central Wisconsin Population of Harriers" which earned the Edwards Prize for best paper of that year.

Frances Hamerstrom was also a licensed falconer. She studied American kestrels and the use of nest boxes as a management tool for kestrels, and banded thousands of raptors in Wisconsin and in other parts of North America during her many travels. She contributed to the book, Peregrine Falcon Populations: Their Biology and Decline (1998).

== Wildlife author ==
As a writer, Frances provided insight into academic science for general readers. She wrote over 100 different technical articles and 12 different books, including several popular children's books. Several notable books include:

- An Eagle to the Sky (1970)
- Birds of Prey in Wisconsin (1972)
- Walk When the Moon is Full (1975)
- Strictly for the Chickens (1980)
- Is She Coming Too?: Memoirs of a Lady Hunter (1989)

Frances was also known as a cook and published a wild game cookbook near the end of her life. Her secret for pie crusts was the use of bear lard. Her readers occasionally sent her bear lard gained from their own kills. Wildfoods Cookbook: From the Fields and Forests of the Great Lakes States was published in 1994, when she was 84, and illustrated by her daughter, Elva Hamerstrom.

By training hundreds of research assistants (nicknamed "gabboons") and by writing formal scientific papers and informal books, Hamerstrom and her husband inspired many generations of future naturalists.

== Home life ==
The Hamerstroms lived in an 1850s-era, Plainfield, Wisconsin home. Never completed, it lacked running water and was heated by wood-burning stoves. Originally designed as a stage coach stop and community center, the structure had an incomplete ballroom on the second floor. The Hamerstroms used it as a storage area for specimens and data collected from their field research over many years.

The Hamerstroms raised two children, Alan and Elva, in their home. Hamerstrom life was far from ordinary. Fran confided to a friend who visited the house years later that "we had all the luxuries (such as a first-rate ornithological library) and none of the necessities".

Frederick and Frances were married for 59 years, until he died from pancreatic cancer in 1990.

She was an atheist.

== Later years ==
Following her husband's death, Frances visited Saudi Arabia, Africa, and South America. On an expedition in Peru, at age 86 Hamerstrom broke her hip and was evacuated by helicopter. She returned to the area the following year to observe hunting practices on a tributary of the Amazon River.

Frances Hamerstrom died at a Port Edwards, Wisconsin nursing home August 29, 1998. She was 90.

== Legacy and honors ==
- In 1961, Frances Hamerstrom received an Honorary Doctorate of Science from Carroll University (then, Carroll College).
- In 1970, both the Hamerstroms received the National Wildlife Reservation Award.
- In 1992, Frances Hamerstrom received the Notable Wisconsin Authors Award from the Wisconsin Library Association.
- In 1996, both the Hamerstroms were inducted into the Wisconsin Conservation Hall of Fame.
- The Prairie Grouse Technical Council and the Raptor Research Foundation offer lifetime achievement awards in the name of Frances and Frederick Hamerstrom.
