= John Holden Warren =

19th century American physician and politician

John H. Warren
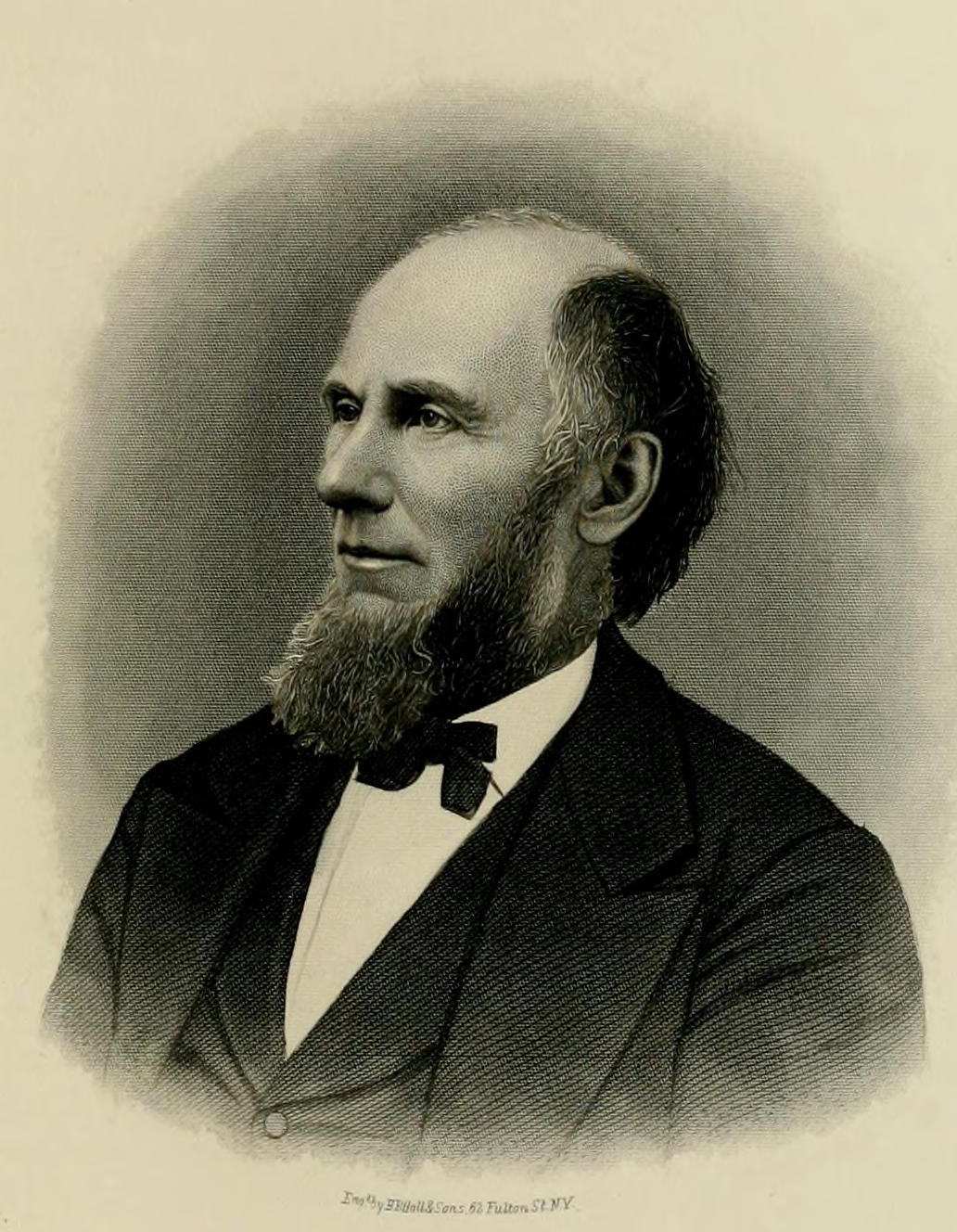
- Engraving by H. B. Hall & Sons

Member of the Wisconsin Senate from the 24th district
- In office January 4, 1858 – January 2, 1860
- Preceded by: George E. Dexter
- Succeeded by: John Wesley Stewart

Personal details
- Born: August 23, 1825 Hogansburg, New York, U.S.
- Died: August 1, 1901 (aged 75) Palmyra, Wisconsin, U.S.
- Resting place: Oak Hill Cemetery, Janesville, Wisconsin
- Party: Republican
- Spouse: Mary Louise Nichols (m. 1854–1901)
- Children: Herbert Nichols Warren^{(b. 1855; died 1927)}; Julia Warren^{(b. 1857; died 1917)}; Elizabeth "Lissie" Warren^{(b. 1859; died 1891)}; Gertrude Warren^{(b. 1862; died 1938)}; Benjamin Hopkins Warren^{(b. 1868; died 1952)}; Fannie Warren^{(b. 1871; died 1896)}; Louise "Lulu" Warren
- Education: Rush Medical College
- Profession: Physician

John Holden Warren (August 23, 1825 – August 1, 1901) was an American medical doctor, Republican politician, and Wisconsin pioneer. He served two years in the Wisconsin State Senate representing Green County. In historical documents, his middle name is sometimes spelled "Halden".

== Biography ==
John Holden Warren was born in Hogansburg, Franklin County, New York, in August 1825. He attended the common schools in that community until age 13, when he went west to the Wisconsin Territory. He first came to Janesville, Wisconsin, when there were just two families residing there, and he attended the first school taught at that settlement. He went on to study the medical profession under Dr. Samuel Nichols in Janesville. He then went to Chicago to further his studies under Dr. Charles V. Dyer, and subsequently attended Rush Medical College in Chicago, graduating in 1849.

He initially established a medical practice at Lodi, in Columbia County, Wisconsin, but, at the request of his brother, abandoned his medical practice in 1851 to come to Albany, Wisconsin, in Green County, to work in the milling and mercantile business until 1870.

Politically, Warren identified with the Whig Party and joined many other northern Whigs in the new Republican Party when it was established. On the Republican Party ticket, Warren was elected to the Wisconsin State Senate from Green County in 1857, serving in the 11th and 12th Wisconsin legislatures. After leaving office, he served as chief clerk of the Senate for the next three terms.

In 1862, he was collector of internal revenue at Albany by President Abraham Lincoln, and held that office for seven years. He owned a carriage service and was a major mail contractor, operating over one hundred mail routes.

Around 1885, he began to suffer from dementia and was sent to the sanitarium at Palmyra, Wisconsin. He died there in August 1901.

== Personal life and family ==
John Holden Warren was a descendant of the New England Warrens. His father fought in the War of 1812 and his grandfather fought in the American Revolutionary War.

John Holden Warren married Mary Louise Nichols, the daughter of his first medical instructor, Dr. Samuel Nichols. They had at least seven children together.

Both of Warren's sons became doctors. Benjamin Warren at Three Oaks, Michigan, and Herbert Warren at New York City. His daughter Gertrude managed a hotel in Biloxi, Mississippi.

Wisconsin Senate
Preceded by George E. Dexter	Member of the Wisconsin Senate from the 24th district January 4, 1858 – January 2, 1860	Succeeded by John Wesley Stewart
