= Sherman Bardwell =

American merchant and politician

Sherman Bardwell (August 17, 1828 – October 23, 1900) was an American merchant and politician.

Born in Allegany County, New York, Bardwell moved to Wisconsin and settled in Plainfield, Wisconsin. Bardwell was a merchant and served in various town offices. In 1873, Bardwell served in the Wisconsin State Assembly and was a Republican. He died in Plainfield, Wisconsin after a long illness.
