= Byron Storm =

American politician (1851–1933)

Byron O. Storm (November 27, 1851 – July 27, 1933) was an American businessman and politician.

Born in Whitewater, Wisconsin, Storm moved with his parents to Wautoma, Wisconsin in Waushara County, Wisconsin. He was a tinner and then was involved in the hardware business. Storm then moved to his farm next to Plainfield, Wisconsin. He served as village supervisor and president of Plainfield. Storm also served on the school board and the Waushara County Board of Supervisors. In 1905, Storm served in the Wisconsin State Assembly and was a Republican. Storm died at his home in Plainfield, Wisconsin from a heart ailment.
