= William C. Hansen =

American politician (1891–1983)

William C. Hansen (July 4, 1891 – August 2, 1983) was President of the University of Wisconsin–Stevens Point and a member of the Wisconsin State Senate.

== Biography ==
Hansen was born in Neenah, Wisconsin, to immigrants from the Netherlands. He attended what are now the University of Wisconsin-Stevens Point, obtaining his teaching certificate in 1911 and later receiving a BS in agriculture from the University of Wisconsin-Madison.

== Career ==
Hansen taught math and history for two years in Menomonee Falls, and continued as an educator in various capacities for several decades, serving as State Superintendent of Public Instruction in the mid-1930s, then president of the Northwestern Education Association from 1939 to 1940, and finally as president of the University of Wisconsin–Stevens Point from 1940 to 1962. From 1965 to 1969, Hansen represented the 24th District of the Senate, succeeding John M. Potter. Afterwards, he was succeeded by William A. Bablitch. He was a Democrat.
