= Plainfield, Wisconsin =

- Village
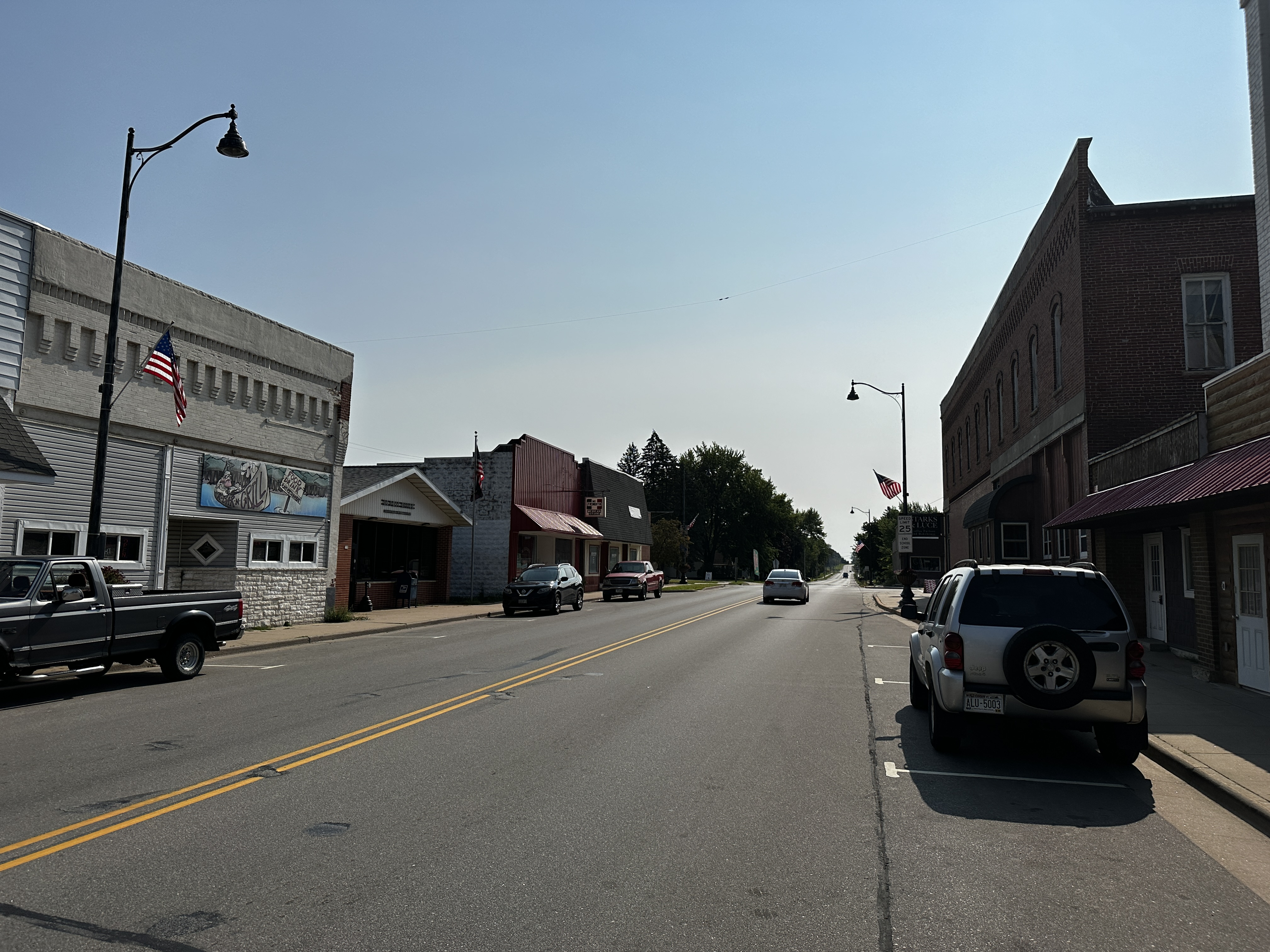
- Downtown Plainfield in July 2024

- Location of Plainfield in Waushara County, Wisconsin.
- Coordinates: 44°11′57″N 89°32′16″W
- Country: United States
- State: Wisconsin
- County: Waushara

Area
  - Total: 1.56 sq mi (4.03 km^{2})
  - Land: 1.56 sq mi (4.03 km^{2})
  - Water: 0 sq mi (0.00 km^{2})
- Elevation: 1,109 ft (338 m)

Population (2020)
  - Total: 924
  - Density: 594/sq mi (229/km^{2})
- Time zone: UTC-6 (Central (CST))
  - Summer (DST): UTC-5 (CDT)
- Area code: 715 & 534
- FIPS code: 55-63175
- GNIS feature ID: 1571576
- Website: https://villageofplainfieldwi.gov/

Plainfield is a village in Waushara County, Wisconsin, United States. The village is located almost entirely within the Town of Plainfield. A tiny portion extends into adjacent Town of Oasis. The population was 924 at the 2020 census.

== History ==
When first settled in 1848, the area was called Norwich. Elijah C. Waterman laid out the village in 1849, building mills and attracting new settlers by offering free lots. Waterman later became the village's first postmaster and changed the name to honor his hometown of Plainfield, Vermont.

== Geography ==
Plainfield is located at 44°12′42″N 89°29′34″W (44.211943, -89.492803). According to the United States Census Bureau, the village has a total area of 1.61 square miles (4.17 km^{2}), all land.

== Demographics ==
Historical population
Census	Pop.	Note	%±
1880	348		—
1890	459		31.9%
1900	728		58.6%
1910	723		−0.7%
1920	580		−19.8%
1930	537		−7.4%
1940	571		6.3%
1950	680		19.1%
1960	660		−2.9%
1970	642		−2.7%
1980	813		26.6%
1990	839		3.2%
2000	899		7.2%
2010	862		−4.1%
2020	924		7.2%
U.S. Decennial Census

=== 2010 census ===
At the 2010 census, there were 862 people, 315 households, and 223 families living in the village. The population density was 535.4 inhabitants per square mile (206.7/km^{2}). There were 371 housing units at an average density of 230.4 per square mile (89.0/km^{2}). The racial makeup of the village was 90.5% White, 0.3% African American, 0.1% Native American, 0.5% Asian, 7.3% from other races, and 1.3% from two or more races. Hispanic or Latino of any race were 18.0%.

Of the 315 households 39.7% had children under the age of 18 living with them, 55.2% were married couples living together, 9.5% had a female householder with no husband present, 6.0% had a male householder with no wife present, and 29.2% were non-families. 26.7% of households were one person and 12.1% were one person aged 65 or older. The average household size was 2.74 and the average family size was 3.35.

The median age in the village was 34.4 years. 29.4% of residents were under the age of 18; 9.2% were between the ages of 18 and 24; 25.2% were from 25 to 44; 24.2% were from 45 to 64; and 12.1% were 65 or older. The gender makeup of the village was 49.0% male and 51.0% female.

=== 2000 census ===
At the 2000 census, there were 899 people, 342 households, and 230 families living in the village. The population density was 692.9 people per square mile (267.0/km^{2}). There were 373 housing units at an average density of 287.5 per square mile (110.8/km^{2}). The racial makup of the village was 92.21% White, 0.11% Black or African American, 1.11% Asian, 6.23% from other races, and 0.33% from two or more races. Some 17.91% of the population were Hispanic or Latino of any race.

Of the 342 households, 34.8% had children under the age of 18 living with them, 50.3% were married couples living together, 12.0% had a female householder with no husband present, and 32.5% were non-families. About 28.7% of households were one person and 14.6% were one person aged 65 or older. The average household size was 2.60 and the average family size was 3.19.

The age distribution was 28.9% under the age of 18, 9.0% from 18 to 24, 28.4% from 25 to 44, 18.7% from 45 to 64, and 15.0% 65 or older. The median age was 34 years. For every 100 females, there were 97.1 males. For every 100 females age 18 and over, there were 93.6 males.

The median household income was $36,328 and the median family income was $43,977. Males had a median income of $29,688 versus $19,750 for females. The per capita income for the village was $15,563. About 8.0% of families and 11.4% of the population were below the poverty line, including 10.2% of those under age 18 and 14.0% of those age 65 or over.

== In popular culture ==
Parts of the Werner Herzog film Stroszek were shot nearby.

== Notable people ==
- Ed Gein, double murderer and body snatcher
- Sherman Bardwell, Wisconsin State Assembly
- Charles A. Beggs, Wisconsin State assembly
- Lyall Beggs, Wisconsin State Assembly
- Frances Hamerstrom, naturalist and author
- Byron Storm, Wisconsin State Assembly
- John Youngs, Wisconsin State Assembly

== See also ==
- List of villages in Wisconsin
