= Nels Andersen =

American politician (1891–1961)

Nels Andersen (January 15, 1891 – May 4, 1961) was a member of the Wisconsin State Assembly.

== Biography ==
An emigrant from Denmark, Andersen was born on January 15, 1891. He married Anna M. Knutzen in 1925 and they settled in Ford, Wisconsin, in 1928. Andersen died on May 4, 1961, and was buried in Gilman, Taylor County, Wisconsin.

== Career ==
Andersen was a member of the Wisconsin State Assembly as a Republican during the 1947 and 1949 sessions. In addition, he was Town Chairman (similar to Mayor) and a member of the School Board of Ford and Chairman of the County Board of Taylor County, Wisconsin. Andersen was a director of the Taylor County National Farm Loan Association.
