= James Hill (Wisconsin state legislator) =

American politician

James Hill (15 February 1825, Hillsborough, New Hampshire – 26 January 1897) was a member of the Wisconsin State Assembly and the Wisconsin State Senate. He was a member of the Assembly during the 1878, 1879 and 1880 sessions. During the 1882 and 1883 sessions, he represented the 24th District in the Senate. Additionally, Hill was a member of the Board of Supervisors of St. Croix County, Wisconsin. He was a Republican.
