= Paul Jaeger =

American politician

Paul O. Jaeger was a member of the Wisconsin State Assembly.

Jaeger was born on June 20, 1891, in Milwaukee, Wisconsin. He became a mail clerk, cost clerk, construction foreman and real estate broker. Jaeger was a member of the Assembly during the 1947 session. He was a Republican.
