= Chester A. Krohn =

American politician

Chester A. Krohn (April 16, 1915 – October 18, 1996) was an American teacher and politician.

Born in Marshfield, Wisconsin, Krohn graduated from University of Wisconsin–Madison and was a high school teacher. He served as clerk of the Marshfield Board of Education. In 1941, Krohn served in the Wisconsin State Assembly and was elected on the Wisconsin Progressive Party ticket.
