= Frank McDonough (politician) =

American politician

Francis T. McDonough (April 2, 1846 – June 2, 1904) was a member of the Wisconsin State Assembly and the Wisconsin State Senate.

== Biography ==
McDonough was born on April 2, 1846, in Ingersoll, Canada West. In 1863, he moved to Eau Claire, Wisconsin. On September 28, 1866, McDonough married Jennie Horan. They had five children. McDonough was a member of Order of the Catholic Knights of Wisconsin, the Knights of Pythias and the Benevolent and Protective Order of Elks. After suffering from severe illness while visiting the Pacific coast, he died on June 2, 1904.

== Career ==
McDonough was elected to the Assembly in 1892. Later, he represented the 24th District in the Senate. In addition, McDonough was an alderman and member of the school board of Eau Claire. He was a Republican.
