= Ernest L. Riebau =

American politician

Ernest L. Riebau was a member of the Wisconsin State Assembly.

== Biography ==
Riebau was born on August 7, 1895, in Milwaukee, Wisconsin. He became president and manager of a shoe manufacturing company. Riebau also was in the investment business. He died on October 3, 1947.

== Political career ==
Riebau was elected to the Assembly in 1944 as a Republican. He remained a member until his death.
