= Wallace E. Nield =

American farmer and politician

Wallace E. Nield (April 1, 1889 – December 27, 1950) was an American farmer and politician.

Born in Racine, Wisconsin, Nield served in the United States Army during World War I. He took a business course. Nield was a farmer and shipped farm produce. He served on the Racine County, Wisconsin Board of Supervisors and was the clerk of the North Racine School. Nield served in the Wisconsin State Assembly in 1947. Initially a Democrat, he later became a Republican. He died in Racine, Wisconsin.
