= John E. Youngs =

American politician

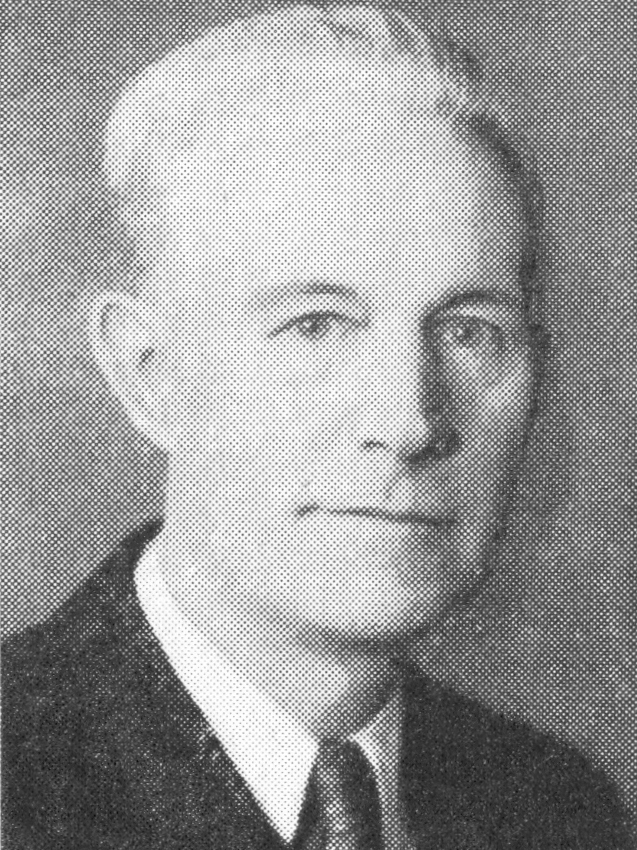
- c. 1940
- Born: August 2, 1883; Plainfield, Wisconsin
- Died: December 18, 1970 (aged 87); Oconto, Wisconsin
- Citizenship: United States
- Occupation: Member of the Wisconsin State Assembly (Republican Party of Wisconsin)

John E. Youngs (August 2, 1883 – December 18, 1970) was a member of the Wisconsin State Assembly.

== Biography ==
Youngs was born on August 2, 1883, in Plainfield, Wisconsin. He later became a barber. He died in Oconto on December 18, 1970.

== Political career ==
Youngs was a member of the Assembly from 1938 to 1950. Additionally, he was a member of the Oconto County, Wisconsin Board of Supervisors and the Oconto, Wisconsin Board of Education (similar to school board). He was a Republican.
