= Charles E. Nelson =

American politician

Charles E. Nelson (born July 11, 1882, in Sweden) was elected to the Wisconsin State Assembly in 1948. He was a Republican. He graduated from University of Wisconsin. Nelson served on the Superior, Wisconsin common council, the Douglas County, Wisconsin Board of Supervisors, and clerk of the Douglas County, Wisconsin Circuit Court. Nelson died on February 7, 1966, in Superior, Wisconsin.
