= Oasis, Wisconsin =

- Town
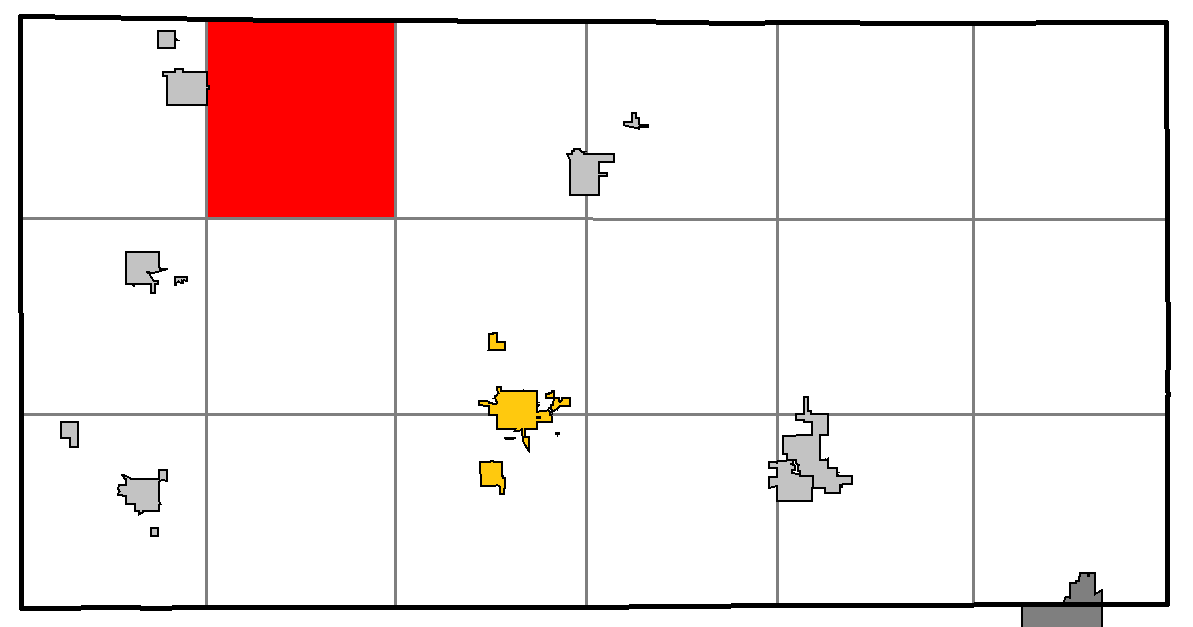
- Location of Oasis, Wisconsin

- Location of Waushara County, Wisconsin
- Coordinates: 44°11′48″N 89°25′15″W
- Country: United States
- State: Wisconsin
- County: Waushara

Area
  - Total: 35.3 sq mi (91.4 km^{2})
  - Land: 35.0 sq mi (90.7 km^{2})
  - Water: 0.27 sq mi (0.7 km^{2})
- Elevation: 1,129 ft (344 m)

Population (2020)
  - Total: 384
  - Density: 11.0/sq mi (4.23/km^{2})
- Time zone: UTC-6 (Central (CST))
  - Summer (DST): UTC-5 (CDT)
- FIPS code: 55-59225
- GNIS feature ID: 1583846

Oasis is a town in Waushara County, Wisconsin, United States. The population was 384 at the 2020 census.

== Geography ==
According to the United States Census Bureau, the town has a total area of 35.3 square miles (91.4 km^{2}), of which 35.0 square miles (90.7 km^{2}) is land and 0.3 square mile (0.7 km^{2}) (0.76%) is water.

== Demographics ==
As of the census of 2000, there were 405 people, 152 households, and 112 families residing in the town. The population density was 11.6 people per square mile (4.5/km^{2}). There were 258 housing units at an average density of 7.4 per square mile (2.8/km^{2}). The racial makeup of the town was 96.30% White, 0.25% African American, 0.49% Native American, 0.49% Asian, 1.48% from other races, and 0.99% from two or more races. Hispanic or Latino of any race were 2.72% of the population.

There were 152 households, out of which 33.6% had children under the age of 18 living with them, 66.4% were married couples living together, 4.6% had a female householder with no husband present, and 25.7% were non-families. 21.1% of all households were made up of individuals, and 11.8% had someone living alone who was 65 years of age or older. The average household size was 2.66 and the average family size was 3.09.

In the town, the population was spread out, with 27.2% under the age of 18, 6.9% from 18 to 24, 24.4% from 25 to 44, 25.9% from 45 to 64, and 15.6% who were 65 years of age or older. The median age was 39 years. For every 100 females, there were 99.5 males. For every 100 females age 18 and over, there were 100.7 males.

The median income for a household in the town was $38,472, and the median income for a family was $41,563. Males had a median income of $28,409 versus $20,417 for females. The per capita income for the town was $16,480. About 3.5% of families and 5.9% of the population were below the poverty line, including none of those under age 18 and 6.1% of those age 65 or over.
