= Charles Simeon Taylor =

American politician

Charles Simeon Taylor (October 13, 1851 – June 19, 1913) was an American lawyer and politician

Born in the town of Geneva, Walworth County, Wisconsin, Taylor went to University of Wisconsin and then graduated from Whitewater Normal School (now University of Wisconsin–Whitewater) in 1875. He then received his law degree from University of Wisconsin Law School in 1876. He then practiced law in Barron, Wisconsin, and was appointed district attorney of Barron County, Wisconsin, in 1876. Taylor was the president of the Barron Woolen Mills Company. Taylor served on the Barron Common Council, the Barron County Board of Supervisors, and the Barron City Power and Light Commission. Taylor was a member of the Republican Party. In 1885 and 1887, Taylor served in the Wisconsin State Assembly and then served in the Wisconsin State Senate from 1889 to 1893. He died on June 19, 1913, while attending a meeting of the Masons at which his son Archibald was receiving the society's third degree.
