= Oscar W. Neale =

American politician

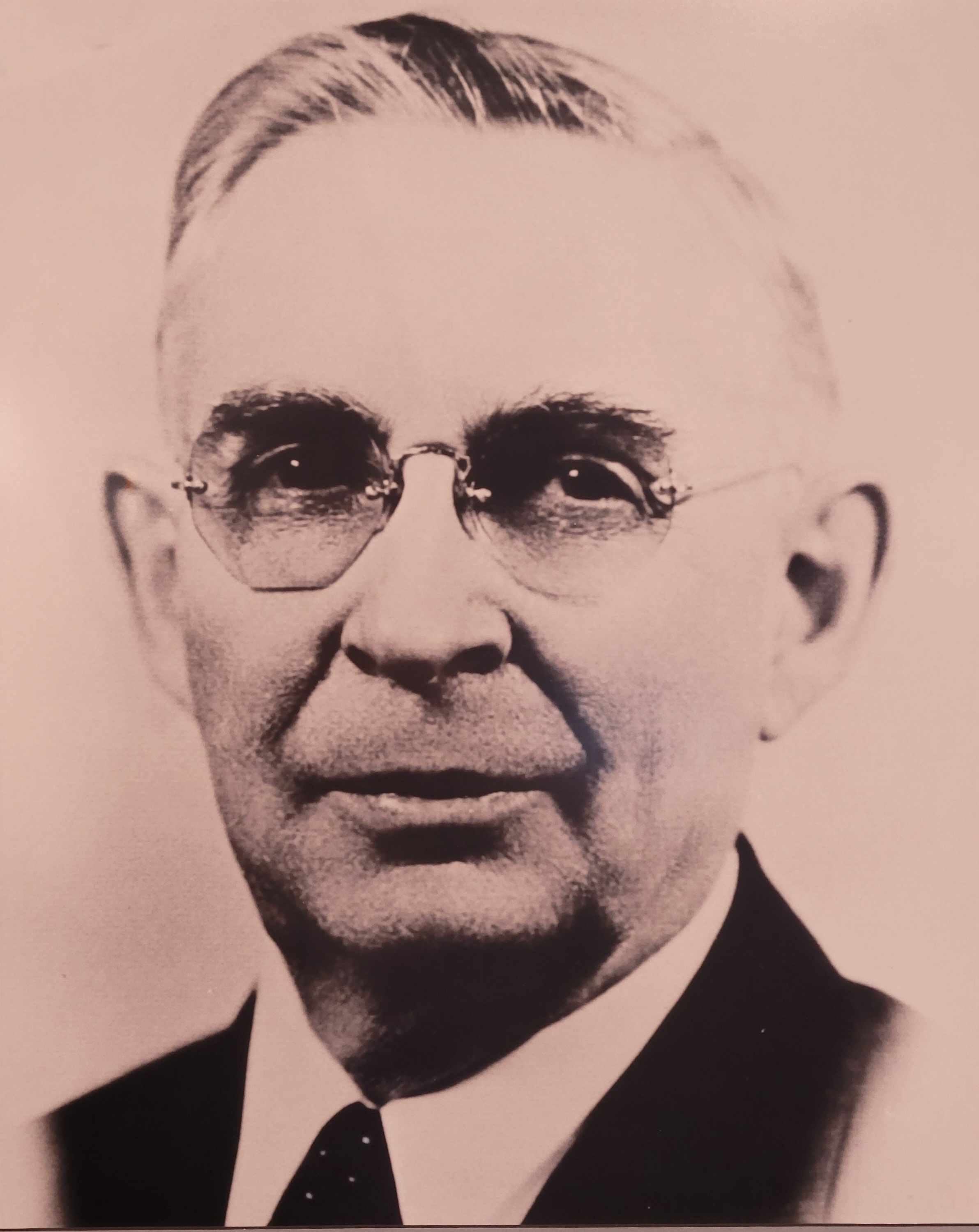
Photo of Oscar W. Neale displayed in the Oscar W. Neale Residence Hall at the University of Wisconsin-Stevens Point.

Oscar William Neale was a member of the Wisconsin State Senate.

== Biography ==
Neale was born Oscar William Neale on December 17, 1873, in Birmingham, Erie County, Ohio. He would become a teacher and a school principal. He went to Denison University in Ohio and to Midland College in Nebraska. Neale lived in Stevens Point, Wisconsin and was the director of rural education at Stevens Point Teachers College and served on the common council. Neale also served as director of rural education at the state teachers college in Kearney, Nebraska. He died on April 9, 1957.

Neale has a residence hall named in his honor at the University of Wisconsin-Stevens Point.

== Political career ==
Neale was elected to the Senate in 1946 and was re-elected in 1950. Previously, he was a superintendent of schools. He was a Republican.
