= 1948 Wisconsin lieutenant gubernatorial election =

- November 2, 1948
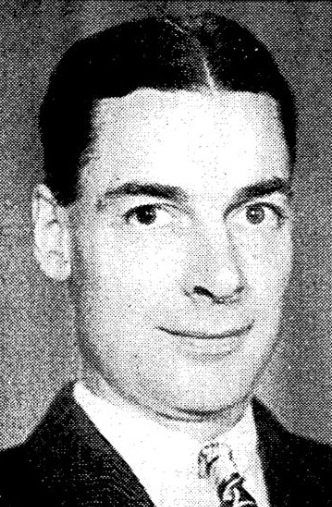

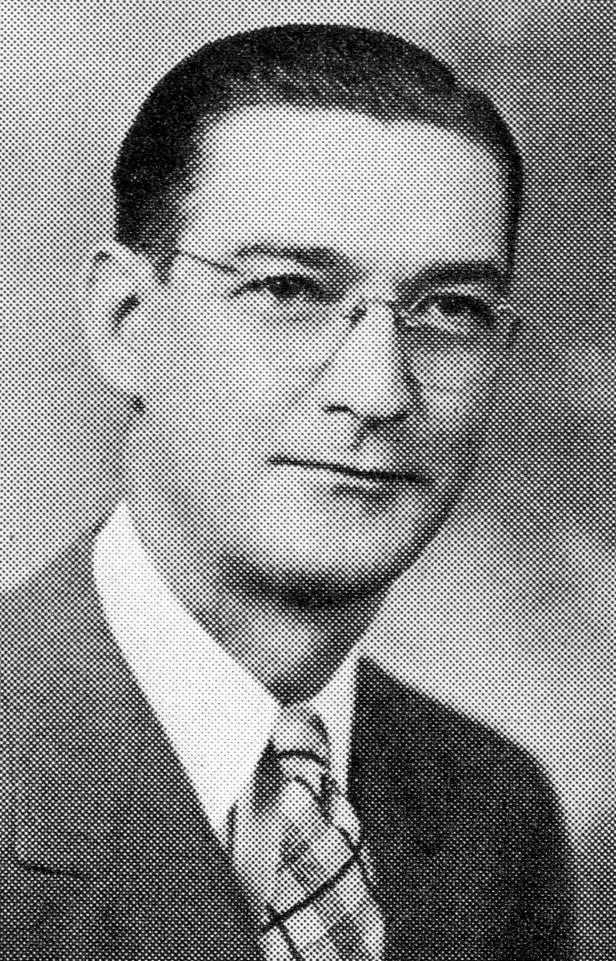
| Nominee | George M. Smith | Anthony P. Gawronski |
| Party | Republican | Democratic |
| Popular vote | 602,513 | 591,732 |
| Percentage | 49.35% | 48.47% |
- County results Smith: 40–50% 50–60% 60–70% 70–80% Gawronski: 50–60% 60–70% 70–80%
Lieutenant Governor before election
Oscar Rennebohm
Republican
Elected Lieutenant Governor
George M. Smith
Republican

The 1948 Wisconsin lieutenant gubernatorial election was held on November 2, 1948, in order to elect the lieutenant governor of Wisconsin. Republican nominee George M. Smith defeated Democratic nominee and former member of the Wisconsin State Senate Anthony P. Gawronski, Progressive nominee Alex Y. Wallace and Social-Democratic nominee William O. Hart.

== Republican primary ==
The Republican primary election was held on September 21, 1948. Salesman George M. Smith received a plurality of the votes (29.75%), and was thus elected as the nominee for the general election. His victory came as a surprise as Smith had only spend $53 on his campaign, and was facing well-known Wisconsin Republicans such as former Wisconsin Senate member James L. Callan, William Trinke and incumbent President pro tempore of the Wisconsin Senate Frank E. Panzer for the nomination. Newspapers at the time theorized that his primary upset victory was the result of Smith sharing the same last name as the late State Treasurer of Wisconsin John M. Smith.

=== Results ===
1948 Republican lieutenant gubernatorial primary
| Party | Candidate | Votes | % |
|---|---|---|---|
| Republican | George M. Smith | 124,000 | 29.75% |
| Republican | James L. Callan | 113,211 | 27.16% |
| Republican | William Trinke | 70,402 | 16.89% |
| Republican | Frank E. Panzer | 66,801 | 16.02% |
| Republican | Francis L. McElligott | 42,443 | 10.18% |
| Total votes | | 416,857 | 100.00% |

== Democratic primary ==
The Democratic primary election was held on September 21, 1948. Former member of the Wisconsin State Senate Anthony P. Gawronski ran unopposed and was thus elected as the nominee for the general election.

=== Results ===
1948 Democratic lieutenant gubernatorial primary
| Party | Candidate | Votes | % |
|---|---|---|---|
| Democratic | Anthony P. Gawronski | 98,764 | 100.00% |
| Total votes | | 98,764 | 100.00% |

== Progressive primary ==
The Progressive primary election was held on September 21, 1948. Candidate Alex Y. Wallace ran unopposed and was thus elected as the nominee for the general election.

=== Results ===
1948 Progressive lieutenant gubernatorial primary
| Party | Candidate | Votes | % |
|---|---|---|---|
| Progressive | Alex Y. Wallace | 6,503 | 100.00% |
| Total votes | | 6,503 | 100.00% |

== Socialist primary ==
The Socialist primary election was held on September 21, 1948. Candidate William O. Hart ran unopposed and was thus elected as the nominee for the general election.

=== Results ===
1948 Socialist lieutenant gubernatorial primary
| Party | Candidate | Votes | % |
|---|---|---|---|
| Social-Democratic | William O. Hart | 3,661 | 100.00% |
| Total votes | | 3,661 | 100.00% |

== General election ==
On election day, November 2, 1948, Republican nominee George M. Smith won the election by a margin of 10,781 votes against his foremost opponent Democratic nominee Anthony P. Gawronski, thereby retaining Republican control over the office of lieutenant governor. Smith was sworn in as the 31st lieutenant governor of Wisconsin on January 3, 1949.

=== Results ===
Wisconsin lieutenant gubernatorial election, 1948
| Party | Candidate | Votes | % |
|---|---|---|---|
| Republican | George M. Smith | 602,513 | 49.35 |
| Democratic | Anthony P. Gawronski | 591,732 | 48.47 |
| Progressive | Alex Y. Wallace | 14,213 | 1.16 |
| Social-Democratic | William O. Hart | 12,343 | 1.02 |
| Total votes | | 1,220,801 | 100.00 |
| Republican hold | | | |
