= WDUX =

WDUX may refer to:

- WDUX-FM, a radio station (92.7 FM) licensed to Waupaca, Wisconsin, United States
- WPCA (AM), a radio station (800 AM) licensed to Waupaca, Wisconsin, which held the call sign WDUX from 1956 to 2020
