= 1954 Wisconsin lieutenant gubernatorial election =

- November 2, 1954
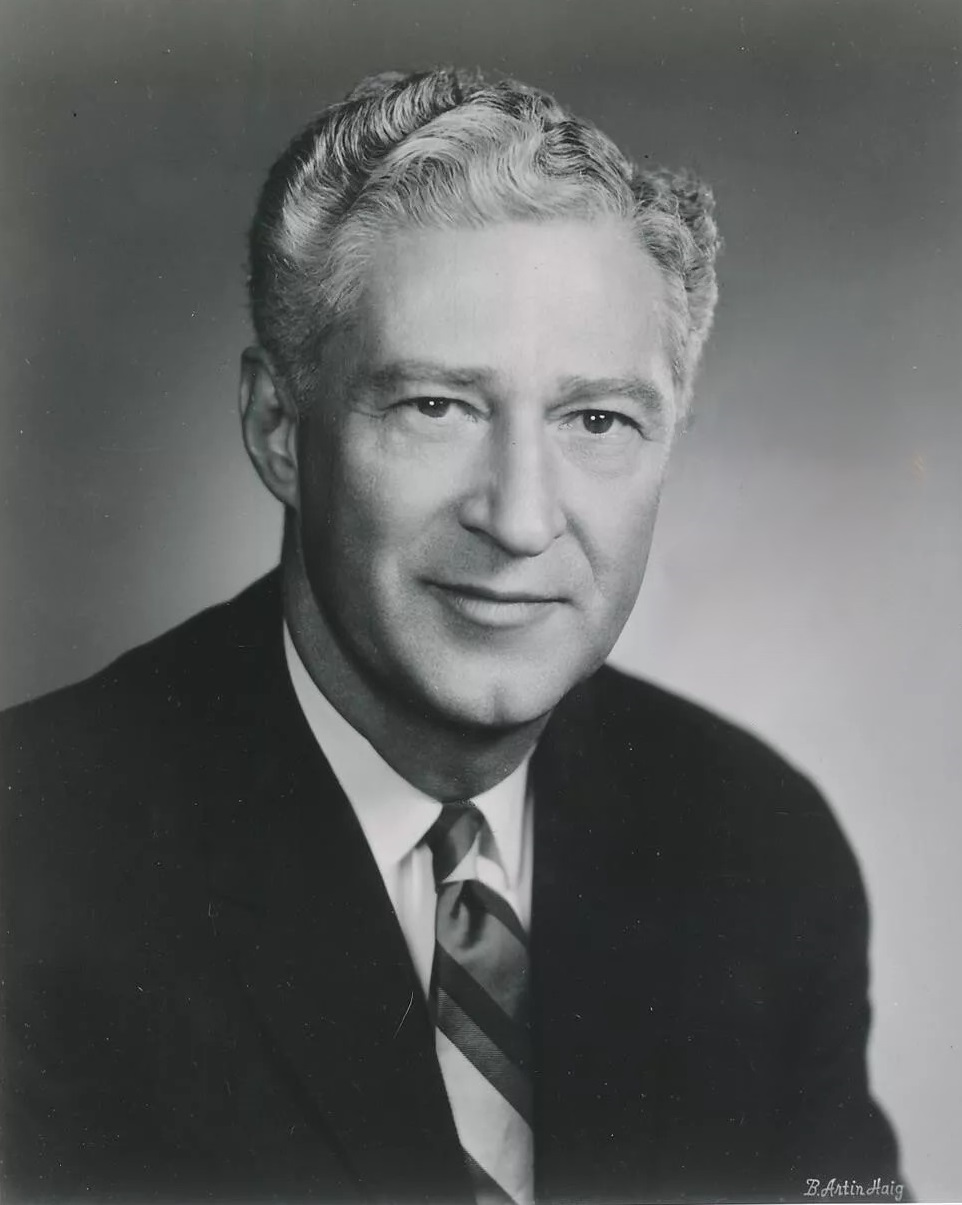

Nominee	Warren P. Knowles	Edwin Larkin
Party	Republican	Democratic
Popular vote	593,520	535,025
Percentage	52.59%	47.40%
Lieutenant Governor before election
George M. Smith
Republican
Elected Lieutenant Governor
Warren P. Knowles
Republican

The 1954 Wisconsin lieutenant gubernatorial election was held on November 2, 1954, in order to elect the lieutenant governor of Wisconsin. Republican nominee and incumbent member of the Wisconsin Senate Warren P. Knowles defeated Democratic nominee and attorney Edwin Larkin.

== Republican primary ==
The Republican primary election was held on September 14, 1954. Incumbent lieutenant governor George M. Smith ran for a fourth term, but was criticized by his party colleagues at the Republican Party state convention for not being an active campaigner. They desired a candidate that would pull his weight for the ticket and thus endorsed the state senate leader Warren P. Knowles instead. In the end, Knowles defeated Smith, receiving a majority of the votes (53.04%), and was thus elected as the nominee for the general election.

=== Results ===
1954 Republican lieutenant gubernatorial primary
Party	Candidate	Votes	%
Republican	Warren P. Knowles	180,585	53.04%
Republican	George M. Smith (incumbent)	159,896	46.96%
Total votes		340,481	100.00%

== Democratic primary ==
The Democratic primary election was held on September 14, 1954. Attorney Edwin Larkin received a majority of the votes (69.80%) over the Democratic nominee in the previous election Sverre Roang, and was thus elected as the nominee for the general election.

=== Results ===
1954 Democratic lieutenant gubernatorial primary
Party	Candidate	Votes	%
Democratic	Edwin Larkin	145,827	69.80%
Democratic	Sverre Roang	63,108	30.20%
Total votes		208,935	100.00%

== General election ==
On election day, November 2, 1954, Republican nominee Warren P. Knowles won the election by a margin of 58,495 votes against his opponent Democratic nominee Edwin Larkin, thereby retaining Republican control over the office of lieutenant governor. Knowles was sworn in as the 32nd Lieutenant Governor of Wisconsin on January 3, 1955.

=== Results ===
Wisconsin lieutenant gubernatorial election, 1954
Party	Candidate	Votes	%
Republican	Warren P. Knowles	593,520	52.59
Democratic	Edwin Larkin	535,025	47.40
	Scattering	106	0.01
Total votes		1,128,651	100.00
Republican hold			
