= WPCA (AM) =

- Waupaca, Wisconsin; United States
- Frequency: 800 kHz
- Branding: 100.7 The Foundry

Programming
- Format: Mainstream rock

Ownership
- Owner: Donald Grassman and Keith Bratel; (Tower Road Media, Inc.)
- Sister stations: WDUX-FM

History
- First air date: April 29, 1956 (as WDUX)
- Former call signs: WDUX (1956–2020)
- Call sign meaning: WauPaCA

Technical information
- Licensing authority: FCC
- Facility ID: 36245
- Class: B
- Power: 5,000 watts day 500 watts night
- Transmitter coordinates: 44°21′15.00″N 89°3′29.00″W
- Repeater: 100.7 W264DS (Waupaca)

Links
- Public license information: Public file; LMS
- Webcast: Listen live
- Website: waupacarocks.com

WPCA (800 AM) is a radio station broadcasting a Mainstream rock format. Licensed to Waupaca, Wisconsin, United States, the station is currently owned by Donald Grassman and Keith Bratel, through licensee Tower Road Media.

800 AM is a Mexican clear-channel frequency.

== History ==
Joint logo for WDUX and WDUX-FM, used until 2020

The station began broadcasting on April 29, 1956, under founding owner Dorothy Laird. Mrs. Laird was part of the Laird family, whose presence in broadcasting included patriarch Ben Laird owning Green Bay's WDUZ-AM & FM as well as stations in Upper Michigan and South Dakota. The station, at 800 kHz, started with a daytime operation of 500 watts, then later 1 kW. Around 1964, daytime power was increased to 5 kW, with a pre-sunrise power of 500 watts. Post-sunset authority was granted in 1987.

For many years, WDUX simulcast the contemporary music format of sister station WDUX-FM (92.7). At some point, "AM 800" would split from the simulcast and converted to a classic country format, at times either digitally-automated or carrying Dial Global's "Classic Hit Country" format.

In February 2020, Ben and Dorothy Laird's son, Bill Laird, would retire from broadcasting and sell WDUX and WDUX-FM to Tower Road Media, whose principal owners have stakes in other stations in Northeast Wisconsin and Iron Mountain, Michigan. By that May, when WDUX-FM would change formats from adult contemporary to classic hits, WDUX would temporarily leave the air to update its broadcast facilities. On July 13 at 4:20 p.m., the station returned to the air with a new call sign (WPCA), a new FM translator signal (W264DS, at 100.7 MHz) as Mainstream rock, rebranded as "100.7 The Foundry," a nod to the Waupaca Foundry.
