= Ogdensburg =

Ogdensburg may refer to:

- Ogdensburg, Michigan (ghost town), U.S.
- Ogdensburg, New Jersey, U.S.
- Ogdensburg, New York, U.S.
- Battle of Ogdensburg, 1813
- Ogdensburg, Wisconsin, U.S.
- Ogdensburg–Prescott International Bridge, connects Ogdensburg, New York to Prescott in Canada
- Ogdensburg Agreement, established military cooperation between the USA and Canada in 1940
