= KPCZ =

KPCZ may refer to:

- Waupaca Municipal Airport (ICAO code KPCZ)
- KWLL-FM, a radio station (106.7 FM) licensed to serve Rayne, Louisiana, United States, which held the call sign KPCZ-FM from 2018 to 2026
