= Waupaca Electric Light and Railway Company =

Overview
- Status: Defunct
- Locale: Waupaca County, Wisconsin
- Termini: Waupaca, Wisconsin; King, Wisconsin

Service
- Type: First-generation streetcar

History
- Opened: July 4, 1899
- Closed: July 4, 1925

Technical
- Line length: 5.12 mi (8.24 km)
- Track gauge: 4 ft 8 1/2 in (1,435 mm) standard gauge
- Electrification: Overhead lines

The Waupaca Electric Light and Railway Company was set up in 1898 as successor to the Waupaca Electric Light Association. It opened on July 4, 1899 with regular service from July 9. Service was typically hourly.

The single line ran 5.12 miles (8.24 km) from the Minneapolis, St. Paul and Sault Ste. Marie Railroad (Soo Line) depot in Waupaca via Oak Street, Mill Street, Main Street, Fulton Street, and Highway 22 to King on Rainbow Lake. The Grand Army of the Republic Veterans Home in King housed 600 Civil War Veterans and their wives, who provided much of the line's ridership. A small station was located near the Veterans Home in King. From there, it continued on to the Grand View Hotel which served vacationers visiting the Waupaca Chain of Lakes.

== Equipment ==
- No. 1 and 2: Four wheel gravel cars, built in 1899 by James Jensen, a Waupaca boat builder
- No. 10: Single truck open passenger car, purchased used in 1899
- No. 12: Single truck open passenger car, purchased used in 1899
- No. 16: Single truck enclosed passenger car, provided year-round service, known as the "Winter Car", purchased new in 1900 from the Jewett Car Company of Newark, Ohio. Equipped with Peckham trucks, General Electric motors, cherry woodwork, and rattan seats.
- No. 17: Single truck open passenger car, probably purchased in 1900 at the same time as No. 16 having the same equipment
- No. 19: Double truck open passenger car, may have been purchased in 1905 at the time of a planned, but never constructed, extension to Camp Cleghorn
- Two open trailer passenger cars, purchased used in 1899
- Single truck baggage smoker car, purchased used in 1899. The car body is still in existence, owned by the Waupaca Historical Society and on display at their depot museum.

== Closure ==
The line was losing money from 1917 and closed on July 4, 1925 after exactly 26 years of service.

== See also ==
- Waupaca Railroad Depot
