= Gusmer Enterprises, Inc. =

Coordinates: 40.67775°N 74.34159°W

- Company type: Privately Held
- Industry: Beverage, Industrial, Edible Oil, Pharmaceutical, Biotechnology
- Founded: 1918
- Headquarters: Mountainside, New Jersey, United States
- Key people: Marla Jeffrey (President); Chris Gusmer (Executive Vice-President); Dave Gusmer (Executive Vice President) Sharon Ciavatta(Corporate Treasurer / Chief Financial Officer)
- Products: Filtration, Winemaking and Brewing Equipment and Consumables, Pharmaceutical Consumables, Industrial Products
- Number of employees: 250+
- Website: www.gusmerenterprises.com

Gusmer Enterprises, Inc. was founded in 1918 to provide products to the brewing market. It currently manufactures and sells a wide range of products geared towards the winemaking, brewing, edible oil, and pharmaceutical markets. Gusmer has partnered with several well-known international companies to provide their products to Gusmer's core beverage markets, as well as to expand Gusmer's manufactured products into other industries. Partnership companies include Millipore Sigma, BASF, Chr. Hansen and many others mentioned below. Gusmer's headquarters are located in Mountainside, New Jersey. Other locations include their primary manufacturing plants in Hickory, NC, Fresno, CA and Waupaca, WI as well as their analytical services group located in Napa, CA and the Gusmer Sonoma Store located in Windsor, CA.

== History ==
=== Formation ===
In 1918 Aage Gusmer started the company to provide a novel tank coating to breweries in North and South America. The company has since increased its offerings to the brewing market while also expanding into winemaking, pharmaceuticals, edible oils, as well as various industrial markets through a combination of manufactured products and partnership products. The company continues to be managed by the Gusmer family, currently in its 3rd generation of management since the company's founding.

== Manufacturing ==
Gusmer's manufacturing sites are located in Hickory, NC, Fresno, CA and Waupaca, WI. Fresno manufactures depth filters, oak alternatives, cellulose filter aids, and fermentation nutrients. The Hickory facility manufactures filtration media. The Waupaca facility primarily manufacturers depth filtration media for pharmaceutical applications, fryer oil filters, laboratory animal bedding as well as various specialty products. Waupaca has recently undergone several expansions to add capacity for its pharmaceutical partnership products. In 2008 the plant significantly expanded its molding capabilities. It was recognized in 2010 as the Waupaca area's best large business and received a grant from the Governor of Wisconsin in 2011. The company's manufacturing facilities achieved ISO 9001 status in 1997 and the Fresno plant has recently completed adding GMP manufacturing areas.

=== Manufactured Products ===
- MicroEssentials - Fermentation nutrients
- Oak-Mor and Oak Advantage - Toasted oak barrel alternatives
- Cellupore and Cellu-Stack - Cellulose based depth filtration products
- Carbac - Carbon impregnated filtration media
- Cellu-Flo - Cellulose powder filtration aids
- Specialty products not under the Gusmer brand; fryer oil filters, laboratory animal bedding, absorbent pads, and pharmaceutical grade filters

== Partnerships ==
A primary growth driver has been Gusmer's partnerships with a wide variety of companies, working to bring their core technologies to the beverage fields using Gusmer's applications expertise of these markets. Examples include BASF chemicals, Chr. Hansen yeast and bacteria, Millipore Sigma's cartridge filtration and microbial monitoring products, and Foss analytical equipment. Gusmer also provides some of its partners with manufactured products to their core markets.

=== Partnership Products ===
- AB Vickers - Finings and antifoams
- Arobois - French Oak Chips
- BASF - Fining agents.
- Bioseutica - Lysozyme
- Bucher Vaslin - Cross-flow wine filtration systems
- Chr. Hansen / Novonesis - Yeast and bacteria
- D.D. Williamson - Caramel coloring
- Esau & Hueber - Brewhouse technologies and yeast management
- FOSS - Winemaking analytical equipment
- Funke Gerber - Beer analytical equipment
- Hamilton - Optical DO Measurement
- Millipore Sigma - microbial monitoring products
- Nalco - Specialized colloidal silica products
- Ponndorf - Grain removal
- Renaissance Yeast - Yeast

== Consultative Approach ==
Gusmer's approach in its core markets has been to work with its customers as a resource to provide applications development, support, troubleshooting assistance and technical knowledge to industry. They've published reference works, volunteered at leading University programs such as U.C. Davis and CSU Fresno, arranged seminars around key topics and play an active role at industry events such as the Unified Wine and Grape Symposium. Gusmer's consultative approach is highlighted through the company's corporate slogan of "Service with Knowledge."

Gusmer is a member of many industry organizations such as the American Society for Enology and Viticulture (ASEV), Master Brewers Association of the Americas (MBAA), Texas Wine and Grape Growers, California Olive Oil Council, the Monterey County Vintners and Growers and The Wine Institute.

The consultative approach also extends to partners with support such as helping with TTB approval for new products or certifying repair technicians. Gusmer's Napa analytical lab, provides a wide range of consulting and analytical services to the wine industry.

=== Services ===
- Analytical services
