= Waupaca Post Office =

- U.S. National Register of Historic Places
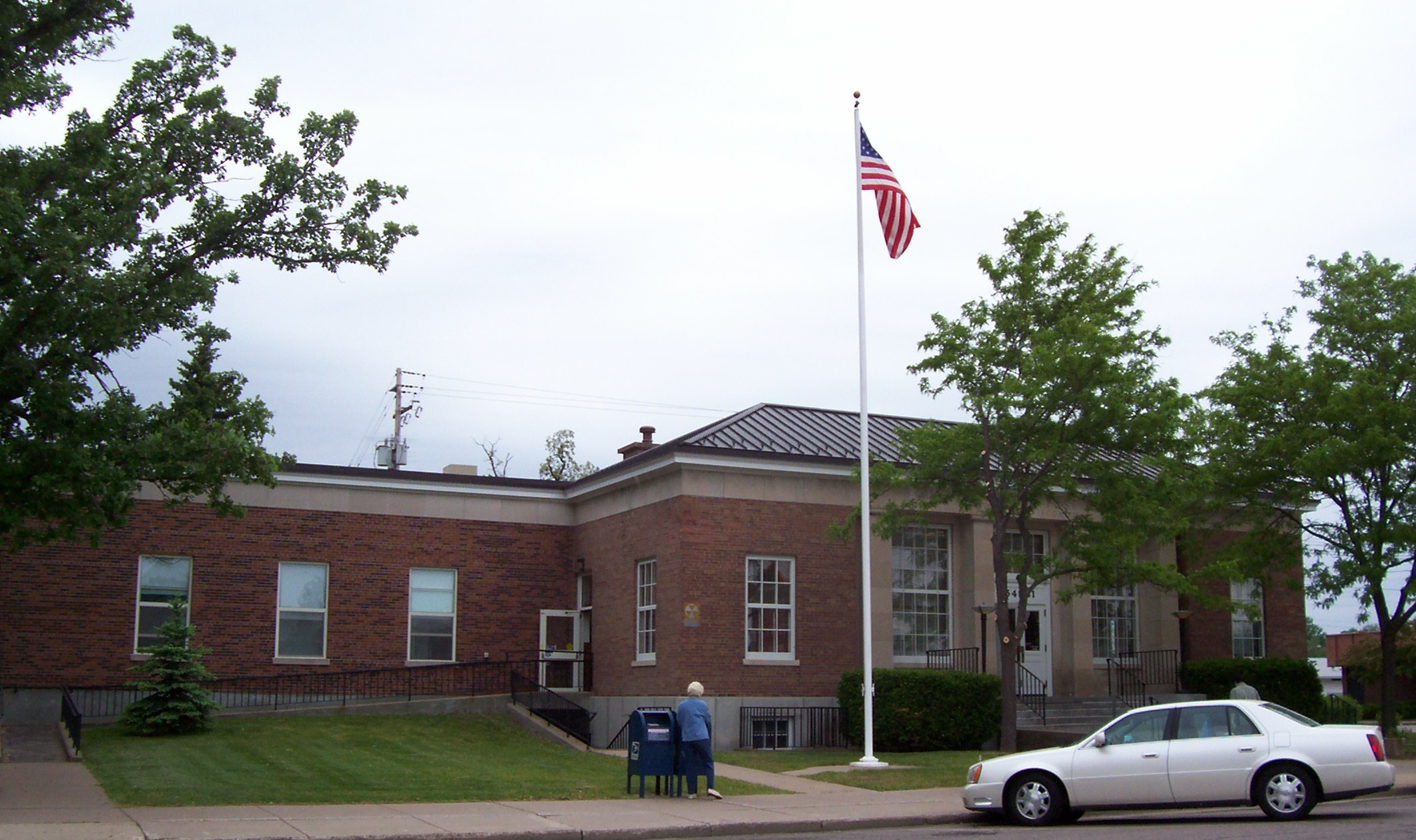
- Waupaca Post Office

- Location within Wisconsin Location within the United States
- Location: 306 S. Main St., Waupaca, Wisconsin
- Coordinates: 44°21′18″N 89°05′07″W
- Area: less than one acre
- Architect: Louis A. Simon
- Architectural style: Classical Revival
- MPS: United States Post Office Construction in Wisconsin MPS
- NRHP reference No.: 00001252
- Added to NRHP: October 24, 2000

The Waupaca Post Office is located in Waupaca, Wisconsin.

== History ==
The post office was a project of the Works Progress Administration. It opened in 1939.
