= WDUX-FM =

Classic hits radio station in Wisconsin, U.S.

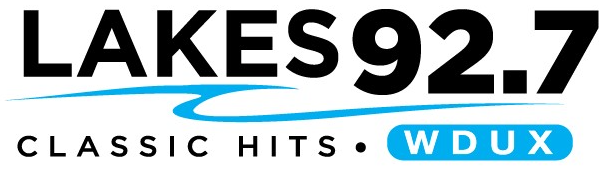
- Waupaca, Wisconsin; United States
- Frequency: 92.7 MHz
- Branding: Lakes 92.7

Programming
- Format: Classic hits
- Affiliations: Milwaukee Brewers Radio Network; Packers Radio Network

Ownership
- Owner: Donald Grassman and Keith Bratel; (Tower Road Media, Inc.)
- Sister stations: WPCA

History
- First air date: January 1967
- Call sign meaning: Once owned by the owners of WDUZ

Technical information
- Licensing authority: FCC
- Facility ID: 36246
- Class: A
- ERP: 6,000 watts
- HAAT: 74 meters (243 ft)
- Transmitter coordinates: 44°21′14.00″N 89°3′44.00″W

Links
- Public license information: Public file; LMS
- Webcast: Listen live
- Website: lakes927.com

WDUX-FM (92.7 FM) is a radio station broadcasting a classic hits format. Licensed to Waupaca, Wisconsin, United States, the station is currently owned by Tower Road Media.

== History ==
WDUX began as a stand-alone AM radio station in 1956, at 800 kHz on the AM dial. Its FM side, 92.7 WDUX-FM began broadcasting in January 1967. WDUX used the moniker, "Mid-Wisconsin's Hit Music Station." In the early part of the 1980s, it also featured a locally produced jazz show Sunday nights.

At the beginning, the station ran an automated easy listening format, then simulcasted the AM. However, in 1987, the AM side began broadcasting an automated country music format, using the monikers "Real Country AM 800 WDUX", and "DUX 'ducks' Country AM 800", while the FM side continued its contemporary music format.

Until May 12, 2020, "FM 92.7" used live and local personalities beyond the morning show, which remains live today. The FM also carries local sports broadcasts, along with Green Bay Packer Football, Milwaukee Brewer Baseball, and Wisconsin Badger Sports. Both stations carried ABC Radio newscasts and features. WDUX became an affiliate of the Milwaukee Brewers Radio Network in 1989, after New London radio station WNBK changed its call letters to WOZZ and moved its studios to Appleton, Wisconsin.

Tower Road Media took over ownership of WDUX(AM) and WDUX-FM effective 5 pm on Tuesday, May 12, 2020. All station staff was terminated at the end of Laird Broadcasting's ownership, with Tower Road Media hiring back one full-time staff member, morning show host Rick Winters, and several part-timers. Rick hosts the morning show from 6 am to 9 am and Brad Williams records local news broadcasts for WDUX. The station uses a Classic Hits format.
