= Edward L. Browne =

American politician

Edward L. Browne (June 27, 1830 – September 18, 1925) was a member of the Wisconsin State Senate.

== Biography ==
Browne was born on June 27, 1830, in Granville, New York. Charles E. Browne, his brother, was a member of the legislature of the Wisconsin Territory. He married Mary Ann Parish on March 4, 1856. They had five children, including Edward E. Browne, who became a member of the Senate before representing Wisconsin's 8th congressional district in the United States House of Representatives. Browne died on September 18, 1925, in Waupaca, Wisconsin.

== Career ==
Browne was a member of the Senate twice. First, from 1861 to 1862 and second, from 1867 to 1868. In 1862, he was a candidate for the United States House of Representatives from Wisconsin's 5th congressional district, losing to Ezra Wheeler. Additionally, he was a member of the Credentials Committee of the 1868 Republican National Convention.
