= Waupaca Railroad Depot =

Railroad Depot

Waupaca
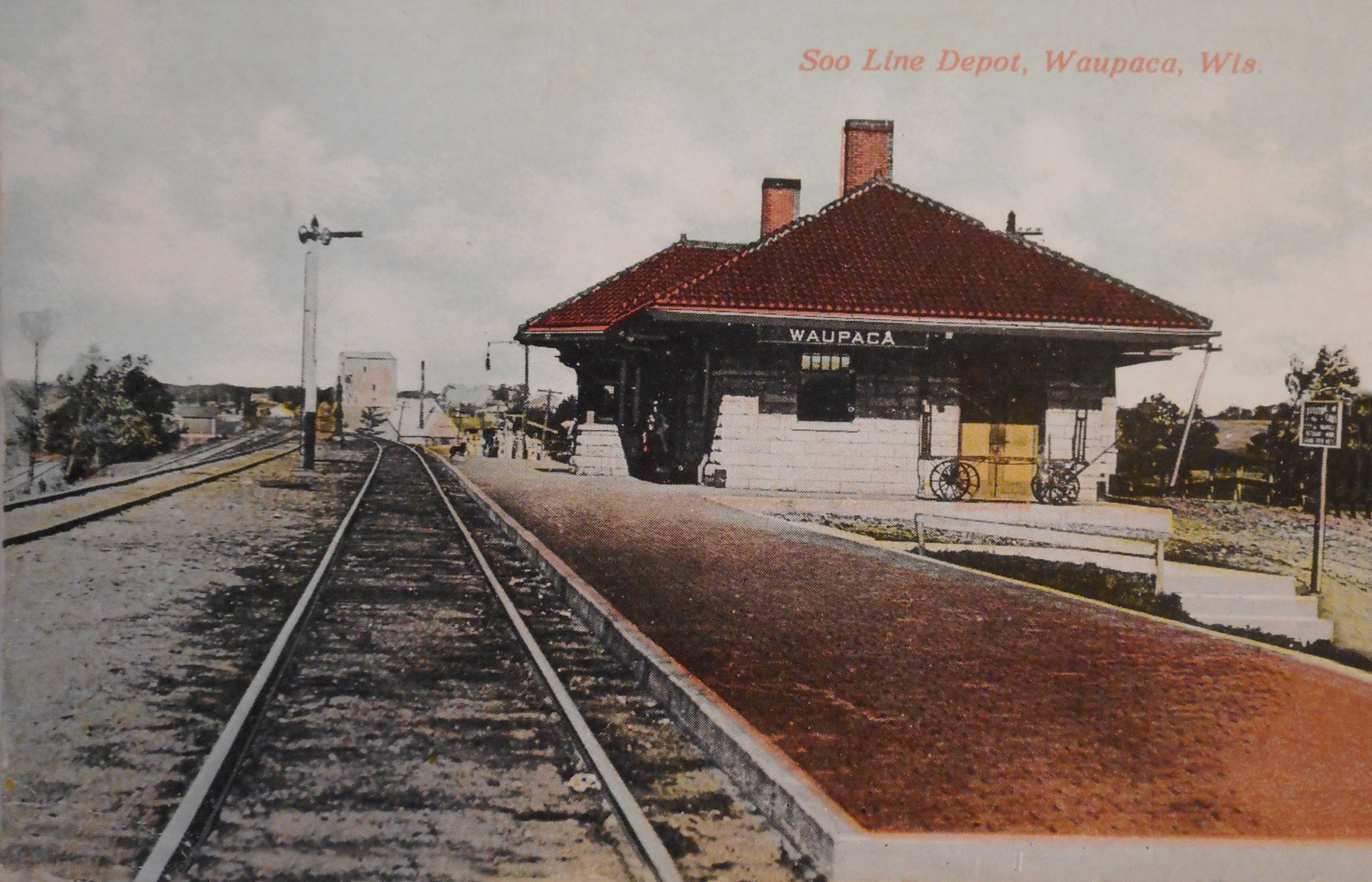
- 1910 postcard photo of the Waupaca Railroad Depot

General information
- Location: 525 Oak Street Waupaca, WI 54981
- Coordinates: 44.36235°N 89.07791°W
- System: Former Soo Line passenger rail station

Construction
- Architectural style: Neoclassical

History
- Opened: 1907
- Closed: January 15, 1965
- Rebuilt: 2004
- Original company: Wisconsin Central Railway

Services
Preceding station	Soo Line	Following station
Sheridan toward Portal	Main Line	Weyauwega toward Chicago
- Wisconsin Central Depot
- Location within Wisconsin
- 44°21′44″N 89°04′40″W
- Location: 525 Oak Street Waupaca, WI 54981
- Nearest city: Waupaca, Wisconsin

History
- Built: 1907
- Built for: Wisconsin Central Railway
- Original use: Railroad depot
- Rebuilt: 2004

Site notes
- Architectural style: Neoclassical
- Restored by: Waupaca Historical Society Mike Kirk
- Current use: Museum
- Governing body: Wisconsin Historical Society
- Owner: Waupaca Historical Society
Location

Waupaca Railroad Depot originally called the Wisconsin Central Depot a/k/a Soo Line Depot. was built in 1907 for the Wisconsin Central Railway and is located in Waupaca, Wisconsin. The former Soo Line Railroad depot is one of Waupaca's historical landmarks. The building was purchased by the Waupaca Historical Society in 2004, and restoration of the building and site began. In 1998 the building's site was recognized by the Wisconsin Historical Society.

== History ==
The depot was built in 1907 by the Wisconsin Central Railway. The Soo Line Railroad leased the depot. In the early 1900s the depot helped Waupaca, Wisconsin become a center of the potato industry.

Passenger train service to the Waupaca station ended on January 15, 1965, when the Soo Line Laker between Chicago and the Twin Cities or Duluth was discontinued.

In 2019 it was reported that a filmmaker was developing a documentary of the restoration process.

== Architectural elements ==
The building is one story with a stone foundation. The building was constructed with sandstone. The roof is covered with tiles. The total area of the building is 27x70. There is a granite exterior with a cantilevered roof overhang.
