= 1952 Wisconsin lieutenant gubernatorial election =

- November 4, 1952
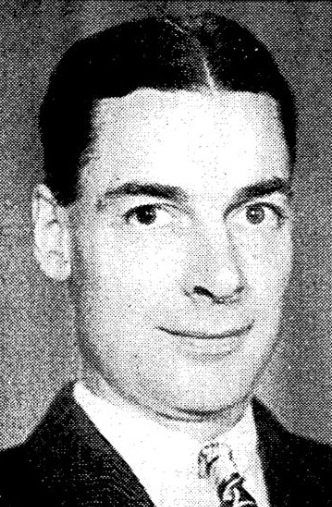

Nominee	George M. Smith	Sverre Roang
Party	Republican	Democratic
Popular vote	995,017	564,725
Percentage	63.64%	36.12%
- County results Smith: 50–60% 60–70% 70–80% 80–90% Roang: 50–60%
Lieutenant Governor before election
George M. Smith
Republican
Elected Lieutenant Governor
George M. Smith
Republican

The 1952 Wisconsin lieutenant gubernatorial election was held on November 4, 1952, in order to elect the lieutenant governor of Wisconsin. Incumbent Republican lieutenant governor George M. Smith defeated Democratic nominee Sverre Roang and Independent candidate Bertha Kurki.

== General election ==
On election day, November 4, 1952, incumbent Republican lieutenant governor George M. Smith won re-election by a margin of 430,292 votes against his foremost opponent Democratic nominee Sverre Roang, thereby retaining Republican control over the office of lieutenant governor. Smith was sworn in for his third term on January 5, 1953.

=== Results ===
Wisconsin lieutenant gubernatorial election, 1952
Party	Candidate	Votes	%
Republican	George M. Smith (incumbent)	995,017	63.64
Democratic	Sverre Roang	564,725	36.12
Independent	Bertha Kurki	3,652	0.24
Total votes		1,563,394	100.00
Republican hold			
