= Alfred R. Lea =

American politician (1853–1931)

Alfred R. Lea (July 10, 1853 – September 8, 1931) was an American businessman and politician.

Born in Oshkosh, Wisconsin, Lea was a clothing merchant in Waupaca, Wisconsin and also owned several general stores in New London, Wisconsin and Iola, Wisconsin. Lea served on the Waupaca Common Council and as mayor of Waupaca. In 1891, Lea served in the Wisconsin State Assembly and was a Democrat. Lea killed himself with a firearm at his home in Waupaca, Wisconsin because of ill health and financial difficulties.
