= Fred R. Fisher =

American politician

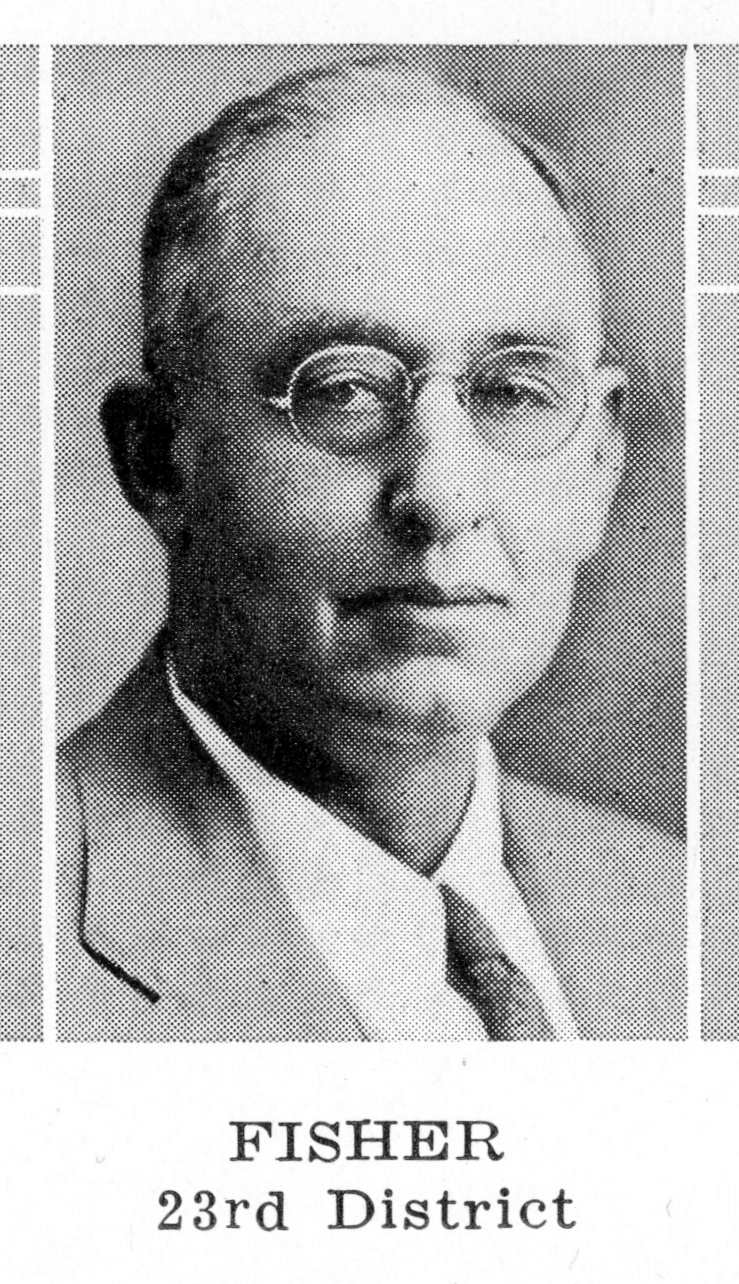
Fred R. Fisher

Fred R. Fisher (1871 – August 25, 1959) was a member of the Wisconsin State Senate.

== Biography ==
Fisher was born in Farmington, Waupaca County, Wisconsin in 1871.

== Career ==
Fisher was a member of the Senate from 1939 to 1942. Additionally, he was Mayor of Waupaca from 1936 to 1938, a Waupaca alderman from 1909 to 1912, as well as a school board and county board member. He was a Republican.

He died at the age of 88, and was buried in Waupaca, Wisconsin.
