= Wisconsin Central Railway (1897–1954) =

Defunct American railway (1897–1961)

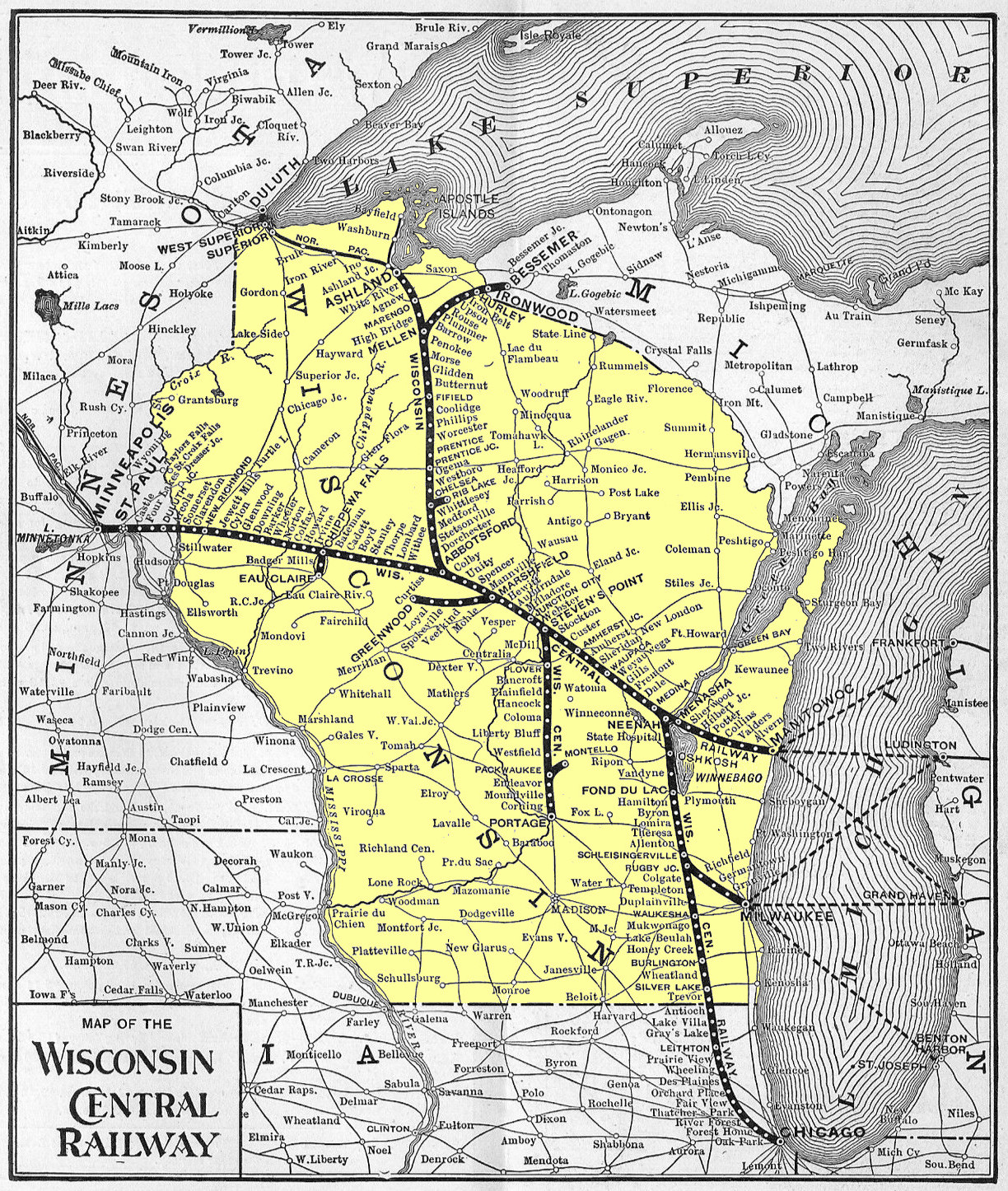
- A map of the Wisconsin Central in 1901

Overview
- Locale: Wisconsin, Minnesota, Illinois
- Dates of operation: 1897–1961
- Predecessor: Wisconsin Central Railroad (1871–99)
- Successor: Soo Line Railroad

Technical
- Track gauge: 4 ft 8 1/2 in (1,435 mm) standard gauge

The Wisconsin Central Railway Company was created in 1897 when the Wisconsin Central Railroad (1871–99) was reorganized from bankruptcy. In 1954, it reverted to the name Wisconsin Central Railroad Company. The railroad was merged into the Soo Line Railroad in 1961.

== History ==
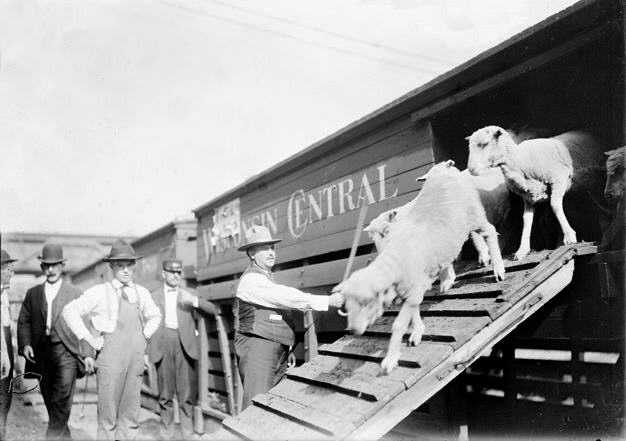
Sheep are unloaded from the upper level of a Wisconsin Central stock car in Chicago in 1904.

After a proposed merger with Northern Pacific Railway fell through in 1908, Wisconsin Central was leased by the Minneapolis, St. Paul and Sault Ste. Marie Railroad, the "Old" Soo Line, in 1909. Controlling interest in the Soo Line, along with Wisconsin Central, was held by the Canadian Pacific Railway. Wisconsin Central entered receivership in 1932, declared bankruptcy in 1944, and finally re-emerged from administration in 1954 as the Wisconsin Central Railroad. It was entirely merged into the new Soo Line Railroad in 1961, which acquired the Milwaukee Road in 1985 and was absorbed into the Canadian Pacific Railway in 1990.

== See also ==
Waupaca Railroad Depot
