= Anthony P. Gawronski =

American lawyer and politician (1900–1972)

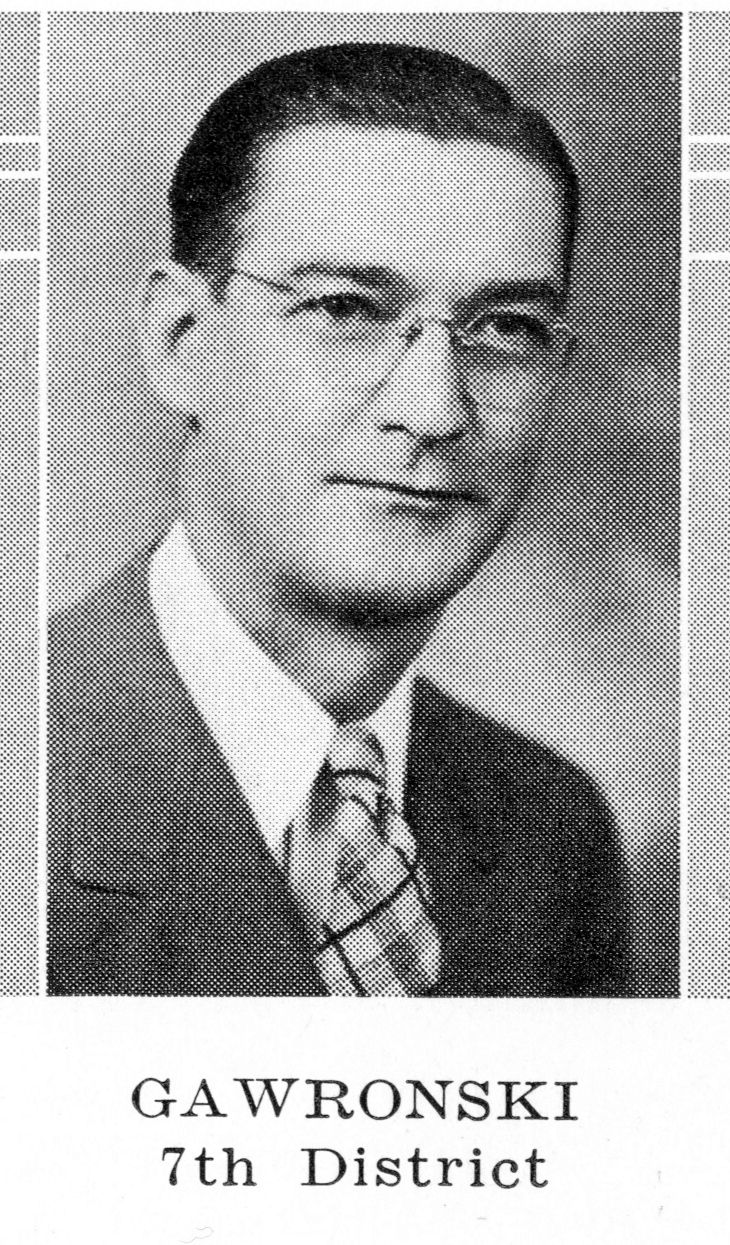

Member of the Wisconsin Senate from the 7th district
- In office January 2, 1939 – December 17, 1948
- Preceded by: Max Galasinski
- Succeeded by: Roman R. Blenski

Personal details
- Born: March 24, 1900 Wisconsin Dells, Wisconsin, U.S.
- Died: January 5, 1972 (aged 71) Milwaukee, Wisconsin, U.S.
- Resting place: Mount Olivet Cemetery, Milwaukee
- Party: Democratic
- Spouse: Sophie Nowakowski (died 1961)
- Education: Marquette University
- Profession: Lawyer

Anthony Paul "Frank" Gawronski (March 24, 1900 – January 5, 1972) was an American lawyer and Democratic politician from West Allis, Wisconsin. He served ten years as a member of the Wisconsin Senate, representing Wisconsin's 7th Senate district from 1939 through December 1948. He resigned his state Senate seat in 1948 to serve as Wisconsin state director of the Federal Housing Administration, appointed by President Harry S. Truman; he served in that role until October 1953.

== Political record ==
Gawronski was the Democratic nominee for the 19th Milwaukee County State Assembly seat in 1930. He came in a weak third in a four-way race, trailing Republican Allen Busby and Socialist Robert Buech. In 1932, he was elected as a delegate to the Democratic National Convention from Wisconsin's 4th congressional district, pledged to nominate Franklin D. Roosevelt for President; and served as a Roosevelt presidential elector that fall.

He was first elected to the Senate in 1938, polling 12,032 votes to 10,348 for Socialist Frank Metcalfe (running on the Progressive ticket as part of an electoral fusion arrangement) and 9,175 for a Republican named O'Brien.

He was a delegate to the Democratic National Convention in 1940 and an alternate in 1948.

In 1948, Gawronski was the Democratic Party nominee for lieutenant governor, but lost the general election to Republican George M. Smith. After the 1948 election, Gawronski was appointed Wisconsin state director of the Federal Housing Administration by President Harry S. Truman. He served four years in that role, resigning in October 1953.

After leaving office, he was hired by the B. C. Ziegler Co. of West Allis, Wisconsin, a business creating and trading investment securities. Gawronski operated a Ziegler office in Milwaukee for 8 years until his retirement in 1961.

In his later years, he lived in a Milwaukee nursing home. He died there on January 5, 1972.

Party political offices
Preceded by Lewis F. Nelson	Democratic nominee for Lieutenant Governor of Wisconsin; 1948	Succeeded by Eugene R. Clifford
Wisconsin Senate
Preceded by Max Galasinski	Member of the Wisconsin Senate from the 7th district January 2, 1939 – December 17, 1948	Succeeded by Roman R. Blenski
