= Reid F. Murray =

American politician

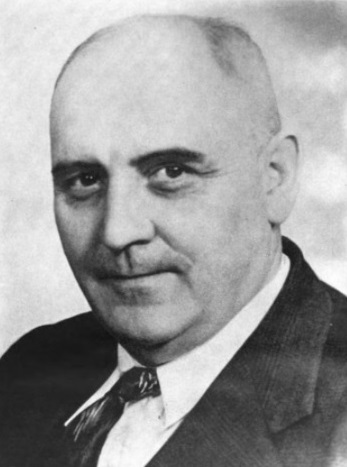
- Frontispiece of 1952's Reid Fred Murray, Late a Representative

Member of the U.S. House of Representatives from Wisconsin's 7th district
- In office January 3, 1939 – April 29, 1952
- Preceded by: Gerald J. Boileau
- Succeeded by: Melvin Laird

Personal details
- Born: Reid Fred Murray; October 16, 1887 Ogdensburg, Wisconsin
- Died: April 29, 1952 (aged 64) Bethesda, Maryland
- Party: Republican

Reid Fred Murray (October 16, 1887 – April 29, 1952) was a U.S. representative from Wisconsin, businessman, and educator.

Born in Ogdensburg, Wisconsin, Murray attended the public schools and Manawa High School. He graduated from the College of Agriculture of the University of Wisconsin–Madison in 1916. He served as agricultural agent for railroads in St. Paul, Minnesota from 1914 to 1917, for Winnebago County, Wisconsin from 1917 to 1919, and for the First National Bank, Oshkosh, Wisconsin from 1919 to 1922. Reid was professor of animal husbandry, at the College of Agriculture, University of Wisconsin–Madison from 1922 to 1927. He also was engaged in agricultural pursuits and in the buying and selling of cattle and farms, in Waupaca, Wisconsin from 1927 to 1939.

Murray was elected as a Republican to the Seventy-sixth and to the six succeeding Congresses. He was elected as the representative of Wisconsin's 7th congressional district. He served from January 3, 1939, until his death in Bethesda, Maryland, April 29, 1952. He was interred in Park Cemetery, one mile north of Ogdensburg, Wisconsin.

== See also ==
- List of members of the United States Congress who died in office (1950–1999)

U.S. House of Representatives
Preceded by Gerald J. Boileau	Member of the U.S. House of Representatives from Wisconsin's 7th congressional district January 3, 1939 - April 29, 1952	Succeeded by Melvin Laird
