= Earl D. Morton =

20th century American politician and judge

Earl Morton

Wisconsin Circuit Judge for the Kenosha Circuit, Branch 1
- In office August 1, 1978 – January 3, 1984
- Preceded by: Transitioned from 1st circ.
- Succeeded by: David M. Bastianelli

Wisconsin Circuit Judge for the 1st Circuit, Branch 1
- In office April 7, 1973 – July 31, 1978
- Appointed by: Patrick Lucey
- Preceded by: Gerald J. Boileau
- Succeeded by: Transitioned to Kenosha circ.

Member of the Wisconsin Senate from the 22nd district
- In office January 2, 1961 – January 4, 1965
- Preceded by: William Trinke
- Succeeded by: Joseph Lourigan

Personal details
- Born: November 28, 1918 Kenosha, Wisconsin, U.S.
- Died: October 23, 1995 (aged 76) Rochester, Minnesota, U.S.
- Party: Republican
- Spouse: Dolores Herrema (m. 1945)
- Education: Carroll University; Marquette University Law School
- Profession: Lawyer, judge

Military service
- Allegiance: United States
- Branch/service: United States Army
- Years of service: 1941–1946
- Rank: Captain, USA
- Battles/wars: World War II

Earl David "Bucky" Morton (November 28, 1918 – October 23, 1995) was an American lawyer, judge, and Republican politician from Kenosha County, Wisconsin. He was a member of the Wisconsin Senate, representing the 22nd Senate district from 1961 to 1965, and later served 11 years as a Wisconsin circuit court judge (1973–1984).

== Biography ==
Earl Morton was born on November 28, 1918, in Kenosha, Wisconsin. He attended Carroll University and Marquette University Law School. During World War II, he served in the United States Army.

== Political career ==
Morton was a member of the Kenosha City Council from 1955 to 1957. He was a member of the Assembly from 1957 to 1960. Morton was a member of the Republican Party. Morton served in the Wisconsin Senate from 1961 to 1965.

Morton was defeated running for re-election in 1964. But shortly after leaving office, he was appointed a county judge in Kenosha County, by governor Warren Knowles. He ran for a vacant Wisconsin circuit court judgeship in 1973 and won the general election. Because the seat was already vacant, governor Patrick Lucey appointed him to begin his term early. He was re-elected without opposition in 1979. He announced his retirement on his 65th birthday, November 28, 1983, leaving office in January 1984.

He died on October 23, 1995, in Rochester, Minnesota.

== See also ==
- The Political Graveyard

Wisconsin Senate
Preceded by William Trinke	Member of the Wisconsin Senate from the 22nd district January 2, 1961 – January 4, 1965	Succeeded by Joseph Lourigan
Legal offices
Preceded by Gerald J. Boileau	Wisconsin Circuit Judge for the 1st Circuit, Branch 1 April 7, 1973 – July 31, 1978	Circuit abolished
New circuit established	Wisconsin Circuit Judge for the Kenosha Circuit, Branch 1 August 1, 1978 – January 3, 1984	Succeeded by David M. Bastianelli
