= Lyall Schwarzkopf =

American politician (1931–2025)

Member of the Minnesota House of Representatives from the 35th district
- In office 1963–1972

Personal details
- Born: June 10, 1931 Waupaca, Wisconsin, U.S.
- Died: January 30, 2025 (aged 93)
- Party: Republican
- Children: Four
- Education: University of Minnesota
- Occupation: Attorney

Lyall Arthur Schwarzkopf (June 10, 1931 – January 30, 2025) was an American politician in the state of Minnesota. He served in the Minnesota House of Representatives from 1963 to 1972. He previously served as the Chairman of the Hennepin County, Minnesota Republican Party and Field Secretary of the Minnesota State Medical Association. Schwarzkopf was later chief of staff for Minnesota governor Arne Carlson. He also served in the United States Army. He died on January 30, 2025 at the age of 93.
