= Edward E. Browne =

American lawyer and politician (1868–1945)

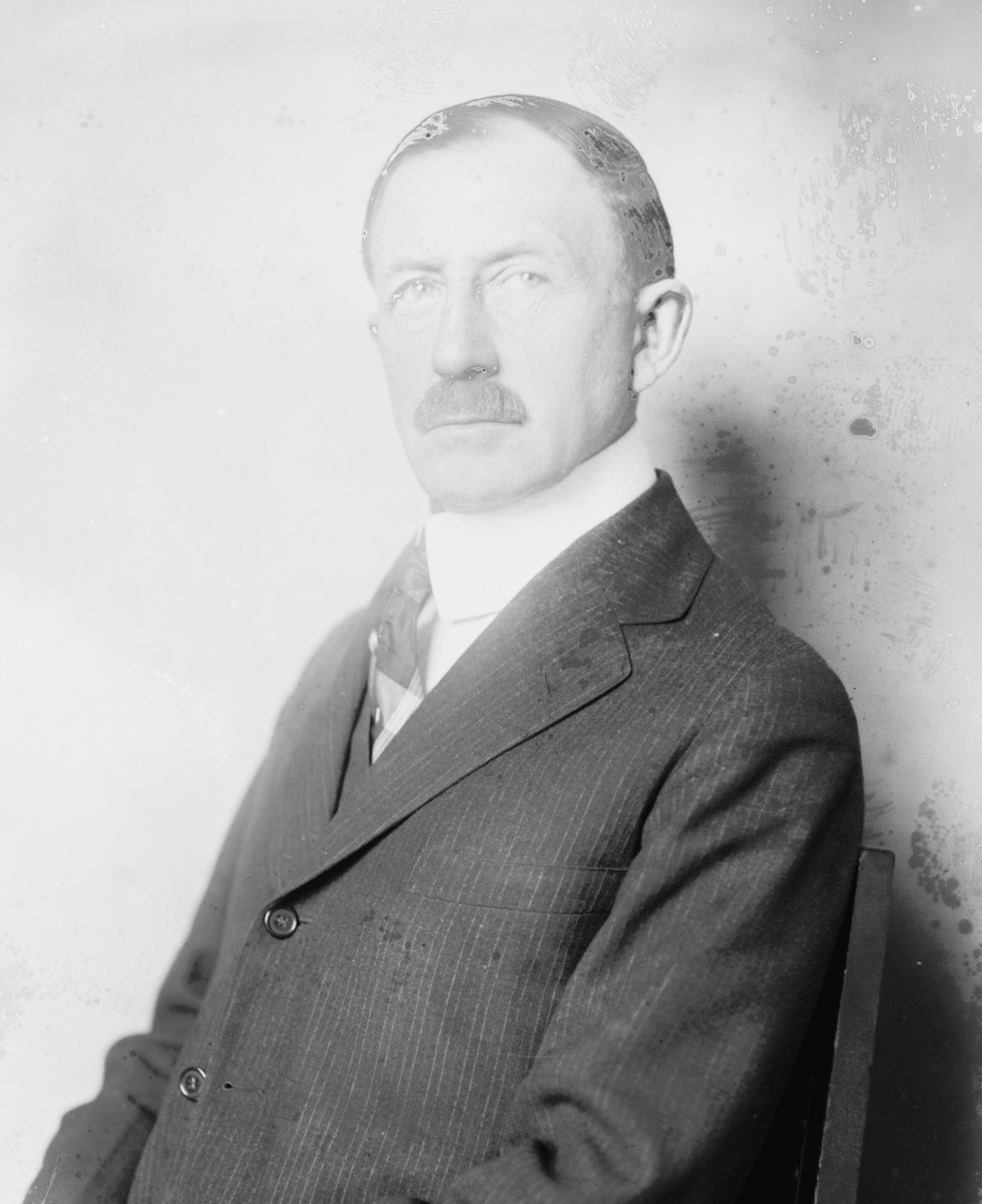

Member of the U.S. House of Representatives from Wisconsin's 8th district
- In office March 4, 1913 – March 3, 1931
- Preceded by: James H. Davidson
- Succeeded by: Gerald J. Boileau

Member of the Wisconsin Senate from the 21st district
- In office January 7, 1907 – March 4, 1913
- Preceded by: William H. Hatton
- Succeeded by: Edward F. Kileen

Personal details
- Born: February 16, 1868 Waupaca, Wisconsin, U.S.
- Died: November 23, 1945 (aged 77) Evanston, Illinois, U.S.
- Resting place: Lakeside Memorial Park, Waupaca, Wisconsin
- Party: Republican
- Spouse: Rose Creppen Cleveland (m. 1893–1945)
- Children: 4
- Parents: Edward L. Browne (father); Mary Ann (Parish) Browne (mother)
- Relatives: Charles E. Browne (uncle)
- Education: University of Wisconsin–Madison
- Occupation: Attorney

Edward Everts Browne (February 16, 1868 – November 23, 1945) was an American lawyer and Republican politician from Waupaca County, Wisconsin. He represented Wisconsin's 8th congressional district in the United States House of Representatives for nine terms (1913–1931).

== Biography ==
Born in Waupaca, Wisconsin, Browne attended the public schools and Waupaca High School. He graduated from the University of Wisconsin–Madison in 1890 and from the law department of the same university in 1892.

He was admitted to the bar in 1892 and commenced practice in Waupaca, Wisconsin. He served as district attorney of Waupaca County 1898–1905. He served as delegate to the Republican State conventions in 1902, 1904, and 1906. He served as member of the board of regents of the University of Wisconsin–Madison in 1905 and 1906. He served as member of the Wisconsin State Senate 1907–1912.

Browne was elected as a Republican to the Sixty-third and to the eight succeeding Congresses (March 4, 1913 – March 3, 1931). He represented Wisconsin's 8th congressional district. On April 5, 1917, he was one of the 50 representatives who voted against declaring war on Germany. He was an unsuccessful candidate for renomination in 1930. He resumed the practice of law. He served as member of the State conservation commission 1936–1941. He died in Evanston, Illinois, November 23, 1945. He was interred in Lakeside Cemetery, Waupaca, Wisconsin.

His father, Edward L. Browne, had been a member of the Wisconsin State Senate and his uncle, Charles E. Browne, was a member of the legislature of the Wisconsin Territory.

== Sources ==
- United States Congress. "Edward E. Browne (id: B000955)". Biographical Directory of the United States Congress.

Wisconsin Senate
Preceded by William H. Hatton	Member of the Wisconsin Senate from the 21st district January 7, 1907 – March 4, 1913	Succeeded by Edward F. Kileen
U.S. House of Representatives
Preceded by James H. Davidson	Member of the U.S. House of Representatives from Wisconsin's 8th congressional district March 4, 1913 - March 3, 1931	Succeeded by Gerald J. Boileau
