= Clay Perry =

American writer and outdoorsman

Clair Willard Perry (1887–1961), called Clay Perry, was an American writer and outdoorsman. He coined the term "spelunker".

== Biography ==
Born in 1887 in Waupaca, Wisconsin, Perry moved to western Massachusetts as a young man. A novelist, short story writer, and journalist, in the 1930s he worked for the Federal Writers' Project. He is best known as an amateur caver and as a writer on the caves of New England and the northeastern United States. He is credited with coining the term "spelunker" in the 1940s. He was also the author of a light verse on Israel Bissell, whose ride in April 1775 to warn the colonies of the Battles of Lexington and Concord was overshadowed in historical lore by that of Paul Revere. He died in 1961 in Pittsfield, Massachusetts.

== Works ==
- Underground New England. Brattleboro, VT: Stephen Daye Press, 1939.
- New England's Buried Treasure. New York: Stephen Daye Press, 1946.
- Underground Empire: Wonders and Tales of New York Caves. New York: Stephen Daye Press, 1948.
- Caves in the Vicinity of Pittsfield, Massachusetts
