= Daniel F. Burnham =

American politician

Daniel F. Burnham (February 8, 1864 – March 25, 1957) was an American farmer, educator, newspaper editor, and politician.

Born on a farm near Waupaca, Wisconsin, Burnham went to University of Wisconsin and taught school. He was elected Waupaca County Superintendent of Schools. In 1908, Burnham purchased the newspaper: the Waupaca Republican and later the Waupaca Post. In 1929 and 1931, Burnham served in the Wisconsin State Assembly and was a Republican.
