= Charles E. Browne =

American politician

Charles E. Browne (January 16, 1816 – October 1, 1895) was an American pioneer and territorial legislator.

Born in Granville, New York, Browne lived in Troy, New York and New York City; he then taught school in Chicago, Illinois, in 1835. In 1836, he went to Milwaukee, Michigan Territory and settled in Granville, Michigan Territory. He was involved in town government serving as supervisor and school commissioner. He was doorkeeper and sergeant at arms for the Wisconsin Territorial Legislature. Then in 1845, he served in the Wisconsin Territorial House of Representatives as a Democrat. In 1865, he moved to Evanston, Illinois and was a trustee. Brown also was field representative for Northwestern Life Insurance Company in Grand Rapids, Michigan. He died at his family's house in Glencoe, Illinois, in 1895.

His brother, Edward L. Browne, was a member of the Wisconsin State Senate and his nephew, Edward E. Browne, was a member of the United States House of Representatives.
