= Gerald J. Boileau =

20th century American politician

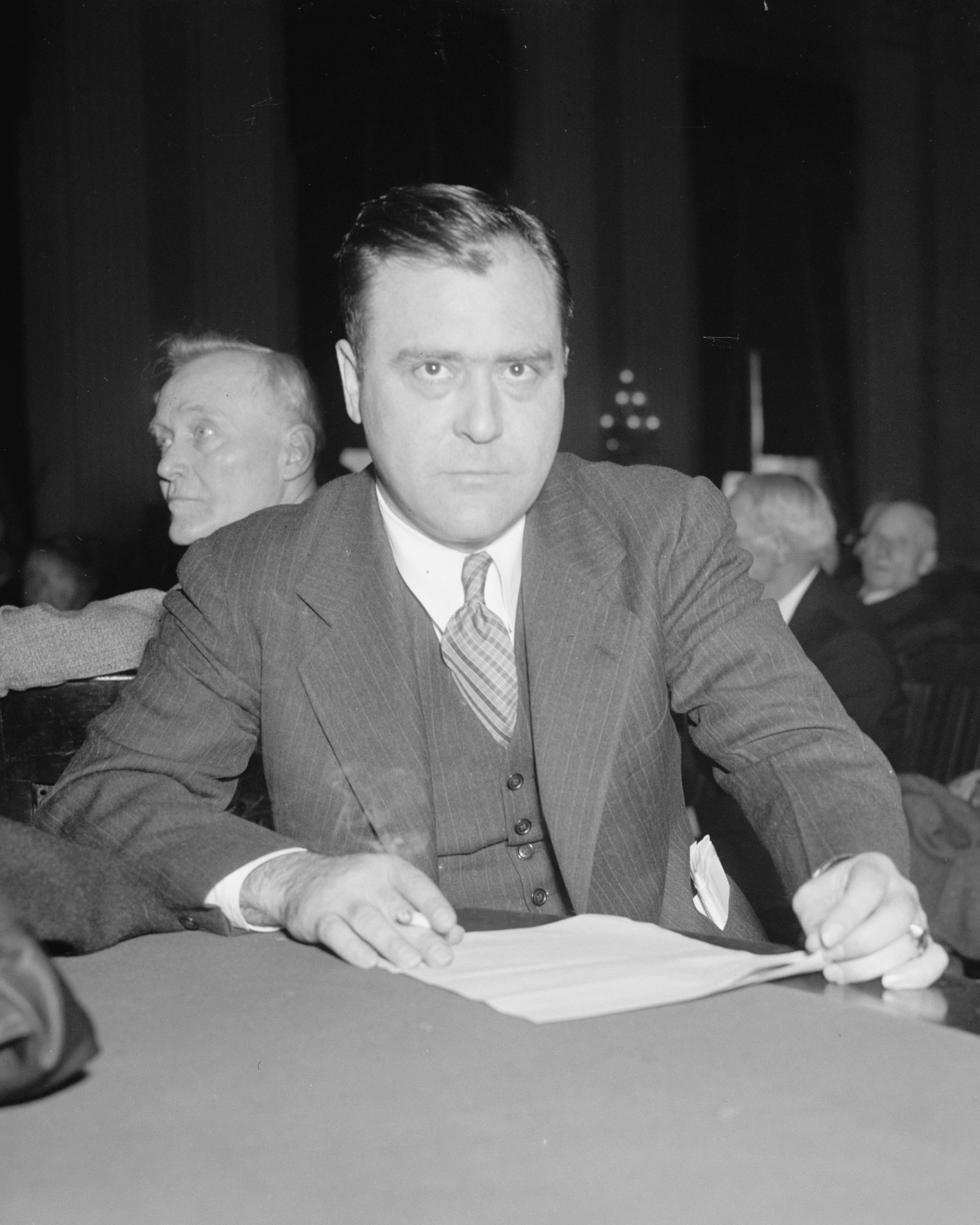
- Boileau in 1938

Member of the U.S. House of Representatives from Wisconsin
- In office March 4, 1931 – January 3, 1939
- Preceded by: Edward E. Browne (8th); Gardner R. Withrow (7th)
- Succeeded by: James F. Hughes (8th); Reid F. Murray (7th)
- Constituency: 8th district (1931-33); 7th district (1933-39)

Acting Wisconsin Circuit Judge for the 1st Circuit, Branch 1
- In office November 1972 – April 7, 1973
- Appointed by: Patrick Lucey
- Preceded by: M. Eugene Baker
- Succeeded by: Earl D. Morton

Wisconsin Circuit Judge for the 16th Circuit
- In office June 1, 1942 – January 1, 1970
- Preceded by: Claire B. Bird
- Succeeded by: Ronald D. Keberle

Personal details
- Born: January 15, 1900 Woodruff, Wisconsin, U.S.
- Died: January 30, 1981 (aged 81) Wausau, Wisconsin, U.S.
- Party: Republican; Progressive (1935–1939)
- Spouse: Monica McKeon (m. 1925)
- Children: 2
- Education: Marquette University Law School (LLB)
- Profession: Lawyer, politician

Military service
- Allegiance: United States
- Branch: United States Army
- Years of service: 1918–1919
- Rank: Corporal
- Conflict: World War I

Gerald John Boileau (January 15, 1900 – January 30, 1981) was an American lawyer and progressive Republican politician from Wausau, Wisconsin. He was a member of the United States House of Representatives from 1931 to 1939. After leaving Congress, he served another 27 years as a Wisconsin circuit court judge in northern Wisconsin. Later in life, he served briefly as acting circuit judge in Kenosha County.

== Biography ==
Gerald John Boileau was born in Woodruff, Wisconsin, on January 15, 1900, to John Baptiste Rosario Poissant Boileau and Sophie Boileau (née Daigle). Due to financial troubles, the Boileaus had to move to Minocqua, Wisconsin, in 1910.

Boileau graduated from Minocqua High School and served in the United States Army, in France, during World War I. He enlisted as a private February 25, 1918 and was honorably discharged as a corporal on July 16, 1919. Boileau graduated from Marquette University Law School, in 1922, and was subsequently admitted to the bar.

He returned to Marathon County and became district attorney in 1926, a position he held until his election to Congress in 1930. Boileau was first elected a Republican to the Seventy-second United States Congress as the representative of Wisconsin's 8th congressional district. For his next term he redistricted to Wisconsin's 7th district and was reelected to the Seventy-third Congress. He was then reelected to the Seventy-fourth and Seventy-fifth Congress but ran as a member of the Wisconsin Progressive Party still representing Wisconsin's 7th district. After his defeat for reelection in 1938, he returned to Wausau, Wisconsin to practice law. He soon after returned to public service as a circuit judge, a position he held from 1942 to 1970 when he retired. He served one final public office, when he was appointed acting circuit judge in the Kenosha-based 1st circuit in 1972, due to the medical disability of judge M. Eugene Baker.

== Personal life and death ==
He married Monica McKeon on August 25, 1925, in Superior, Wisconsin. They had two daughters, Nancy and Mary.

He died in Wausau on January 30, 1981. He was the last surviving man elected to Congress as a member of the Wisconsin Progressive Party.

U.S. House of Representatives
Preceded by Edward E. Browne	Member of the U.S. House of Representatives from Wisconsin's 8th congressional district March 4, 1931 - March 4, 1933	Succeeded by James F. Hughes
Preceded by Gardner R. Withrow	Member of the U.S. House of Representatives from Wisconsin's 7th congressional district March 4, 1933 - January 3, 1939	Succeeded by Reid F. Murray
Legal offices
Preceded by Claire B. Bird	Wisconsin Circuit Judge for the 16th Circuit; June 1, 1942 – January 1, 1970	Succeeded by Ronald D. Keberle
Preceded by M. Eugene Baker	Acting Wisconsin Circuit Judge for the 1st Circuit, Branch 1 November 1972 – April 7, 1973	Succeeded by Earl D. Morton
