= Waupaca Foundry =

American company

- Formerly: ThyssenKrupp Waupaca
- Type: Private
- Industry: Foundry
- Founded: 1871; 155 years ago
- Headquarters: 1955 Brunner Drive; Waupaca, Wisconsin, United States
- Key people: Mike Hawthorne (President)
- Products: Industrial iron Castings (light vehicle, commercial vehicle, agriculture, construction, material handling, and other industrial sectors)
- Owner: Monomoy Capital Partners; (2024–present); Hitachi; (2014–24)
- Number of employees: 3,500
- Website: waupacafoundry.com

Waupaca Foundry, Inc. is an American company founded in 1871 and incorporated in 1948, which is among the largest independent iron foundries in the world. Formerly known as ThyssenKrupp Waupaca, it produces gray, ductile, and compacted graphite iron castings.

Based in Waupaca, Wisconsin, the firm has approximately 3,500 employees. In addition to maintaining three plants in its headquarters city, it has foundry units located in Marinette, Wisconsin and Tell City, Indiana.

After being controlled by ThyssenKrupp and being called ThyssenKrupp Waupaca, it was purchased by New York City-based private equity firm KPS Capital Partners and renamed Waupaca Foundry. In 2014, it was acquired by Hitachi Metals, becoming part of Hitachi Metals’ high-grade Functional Components Company.

On March 5, 2024, Monomoy Capital Partners announced that it had completed the acquisition of the company.
