= Ogdensburg, Wisconsin =

- Village
- Location of Ogdensburg in Waupaca County, Wisconsin.
- Coordinates: 44°27′8″N 89°1′59″W
- Country: United States
- State: Wisconsin
- County: Waupaca

Area
  - Total: 1.03 sq mi (2.66 km^{2})
  - Land: 0.97 sq mi (2.52 km^{2})
  - Water: 0.054 sq mi (0.14 km^{2})
- Elevation: 850 ft (259 m)

Population (2020)
  - Total: 188
  - Density: 193/sq mi (74.6/km^{2})
- Time zone: UTC-6 (Central (CST))
  - Summer (DST): UTC-5 (CDT)
- Postal code: 54962
- Area code: 920
- FIPS code: 55-59475
- GNIS feature ID: 1570755
- Website: https://www.villageofogdensburg.org/

Ogdensburg is a village in Waupaca County, Wisconsin, United States. The population was 188 at the 2020 census.

== Geography ==
Ogdensburg is located at 44°27′8″N 89°1′59″W (44.452192, -89.032939).

According to the United States Census Bureau, the village has a total area of 1.01 square miles (2.62 km^{2}), of which 0.96 square miles (2.49 km^{2}) is land and 0.05 square miles (0.13 km^{2}) is water.

== History ==
The village, in St. Lawrence Township, was named in honor of a founder, Caleb Smith Ogden, who, with partners, constructed a dam across St. Lawrence Creek. The dam was followed by a sawmill and grist mill both which were built and operated by C. S. Ogden.

== Demographics ==
Historical population
| Census | Pop. | Note | %± |
|---|---|---|---|
| 1920 | 237 | | — |
| 1930 | 176 | | −25.7% |
| 1940 | 207 | | 17.6% |
| 1950 | 221 | | 6.8% |
| 1960 | 181 | | −18.1% |
| 1970 | 206 | | 13.8% |
| 1980 | 214 | | 3.9% |
| 1990 | 220 | | 2.8% |
| 2000 | 224 | | 1.8% |
| 2010 | 185 | | −17.4% |
| 2020 | 188 | | 1.6% |
U.S. Decennial Census

=== 2010 census ===
As of the census of 2010, there were 185 people, 82 households, and 57 families living in the village. The population density was 192.7 inhabitants per square mile (74.4/km^{2}). There were 98 housing units at an average density of 102.1 per square mile (39.4/km^{2}). The racial makeup of the village was 96.2% White, 1.1% Native American, 1.6% Asian, and 1.1% from two or more races.

There were 82 households, of which 26.8% had children under the age of 18 living with them, 52.4% were married couples living together, 7.3% had a female householder with no husband present, 9.8% had a male householder with no wife present, and 30.5% were non-families. 23.2% of all households were made up of individuals, and 9.7% had someone living alone who was 65 years of age or older. The average household size was 2.26 and the average family size was 2.63.

The median age in the village was 44.8 years. 18.4% of residents were under the age of 18; 9.2% were between the ages of 18 and 24; 22.6% were from 25 to 44; 32.4% were from 45 to 64; and 17.3% were 65 years of age or older. The gender makeup of the village was 53.0% male and 47.0% female.

=== 2000 census ===
As of the census of 2000, there were 224 people, 94 households, and 67 families living in the village. The population density was 229.2 people per square mile (88.3/km^{2}). There were 98 housing units at an average density of 100.3 per square mile (38.6/km^{2}). The racial makeup of the village was 100.00% White.

There were 94 households, out of which 31.9% had children under the age of 18 living with them, 56.4% were married couples living together, 10.6% had a female householder with no husband present, and 28.7% were non-families. 27.7% of all households were made up of individuals, and 6.4% had someone living alone who was 65 years of age or older. The average household size was 2.38 and the average family size was 2.81.

In the village, the population was spread out, with 25.9% under the age of 18, 7.1% from 18 to 24, 33.9% from 25 to 44, 21.4% from 45 to 64, and 11.6% who were 65 years of age or older. The median age was 38 years. For every 100 females, there were 91.5 males. For every 100 females age 18 and over, there were 97.6 males.

The median income for a household in the village was $36,667, and the median income for a family was $39,583. Males had a median income of $31,136 versus $26,667 for females. The per capita income for the village was $18,588. About 10.3% of families and 12.4% of the population were below the poverty line, including 14.9% of those under the age of eighteen and none of those 65 or over.

== Notable people ==
- Reid F. Murray (1887–1952), U.S. representative from Wisconsin
