= George M. Smith =

20th century American politician

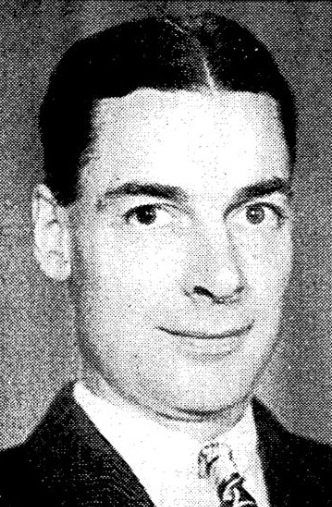
- From The Wisconsin Blue Book for 1952

31st Lieutenant Governor of Wisconsin
- In office January 3, 1949 – January 3, 1955
- Governor: Oscar Rennebohm; Walter J. Kohler Jr.
- Preceded by: Oscar Rennebohm
- Succeeded by: Warren P. Knowles

Personal details
- Born: May 18, 1912 Montreal, Quebec, Canada
- Died: October 21, 1962 (aged 50) Milwaukee, Wisconsin, U.S.
- Resting place: Arlington Park Cemetery, Greenfield, Wisconsin
- Party: Republican
- Spouse: Jannet R. Warner (m. 1935–1962)
- Children: 3
- Occupation: Salesman, insurance

George M. Smith (May 18, 1912 – October 21, 1962) was a Canadian American immigrant, businessman, and Republican politician, from Greenfield, Wisconsin. He was the 31st lieutenant governor of Wisconsin, serving three terms from 1949 to 1955.

== Biography ==
George M. Smith was born May 18, 1912, in Montreal, Quebec. He attended college in Winnipeg before emigrating to the United States in 1941. He moved to Milwaukee, Wisconsin, then relocated to the Milwaukee suburb of Greenfield, Wisconsin, where he earned his American citizenship in 1944.

He worked as a salesman for a textile company and was said to be an expert in wool. He came from political obscurity to run for lieutenant governor of Wisconsin in 1948. Spending only $53 on his campaign, he shocked the state by winning the Republican Party nomination over well-known Wisconsin Republicans Frank E. Panzer, William Trinke, and James L. Callan. Newspapers at the time theorized that his primary victory was due in part to having a familiar name. Smith went on to win the general election with 49% of the vote, in an era when Republicans were fairly dominant in Wisconsin's statewide elections.

Smith would win re-election twice, in 1950 and 1952, becoming only the third Wisconsin lieutenant governor to serve three terms. He won these terms despite the fact that he never became a very active campaigner. That ultimately was his downfall when he ran for a fourth term in 1954. Delegates to the Republican Party state convention cited the need for a lieutenant governor nominee who would pull his weight for the ticket when they endorsed long-time Republican state senate leader Warren P. Knowles for the job. Knowles defeated Smith in the statewide primary, though Smith still received 47% of the primary vote.

After leaving office, Smith operated an insurance business out of his home in Greenfield and did not run for another political office. He had chronic Nephritis, and, in 1962, he became partly paralyzed due to a fall. He died four months after his accident, on October 21, 1962, at a hospital in Milwaukee.

== Personal life and family ==
George M. Smith married Jannet R. Warner in 1935. They had at least three children together and were married for 27 years before his death in 1962.

== Electoral history ==
=== Wisconsin Lieutenant Governor (1948, 1950, 1952, 1954) ===
Year	Election	Date	Elected				Defeated				Total	Plurality
1948	Primary	Sep. 21	George M. Smith	Republican	124,000	29.75%	James L. Callan	Rep.	113,211	27.16%	416,857	10,789
1948	Primary	Sep. 21	George M. Smith	Republican	124,000	29.75%	William Trinke	Rep.	70,402	16.89%	416,857	10,789
1948	Primary	Sep. 21	George M. Smith	Republican	124,000	29.75%	Frank E. Panzer	Rep.	66,801	16.02%	416,857	10,789
1948	Primary	Sep. 21	George M. Smith	Republican	124,000	29.75%	Francis L. McElligott	Rep.	42,443	10.18%	416,857	10,789
1948	General	Nov. 2	George M. Smith	Republican	602,513	49.35%	Anthony P. Gawronski	Dem.	591,732	48.47%	1,220,801	10,781
1948	General	Nov. 2	George M. Smith	Republican	602,513	49.35%	Alex Y. Wallace	Prog.	14,213	1.16%	1,220,801	10,781
1948	General	Nov. 2	George M. Smith	Republican	602,513	49.35%	William O. Hart	Soc.	12,343	1.01%	1,220,801	10,781
1950	Primary	Sep. 19	George M. Smith (inc)	Republican	237,488	61.85%	Schultz	Rep.	146,464	38.15%	383,952	91,024
1950	General	Nov. 7	George M. Smith (inc)	Republican	617,668	56.02%	Eugene R. Clifford	Dem.	480,696	43.60%	1,102,636	136,972
1950	General	Nov. 7	George M. Smith (inc)	Republican	617,668	56.02%	Rudolph Beyer	Soc.	4,272	1.01%	1,102,636	136,972
1952	General	Nov. 4	George M. Smith (inc)	Republican	995,017	63.64%	Sverre Roang	Dem.	564,725	36.12%	1,563,394	430,292
1952	General	Nov. 4	George M. Smith (inc)	Republican	995,017	63.64%	Bertha Kurki	Ind.	3,652	0.23%	1,563,394	430,292
1954	Primary	Sep. 14	Warren P. Knowles	Republican	180,585	53.04%	George M. Smith (inc)	Rep.	159,896	46.96%	340,481	20,689

Party political offices
Preceded by Oscar Rennebohm	Republican nominee for Lieutenant Governor of Wisconsin; 1948, 1950, 1952	Succeeded by Warren P. Knowles
Political offices
Preceded by Oscar Rennebohm	Lieutenant Governor of Wisconsin; 1949–1955	Succeeded by Warren P. Knowles
