= Waupaca Municipal Airport =

Airport in Wisconsin, United States

Waupaca Municipal Airport Brunner Field
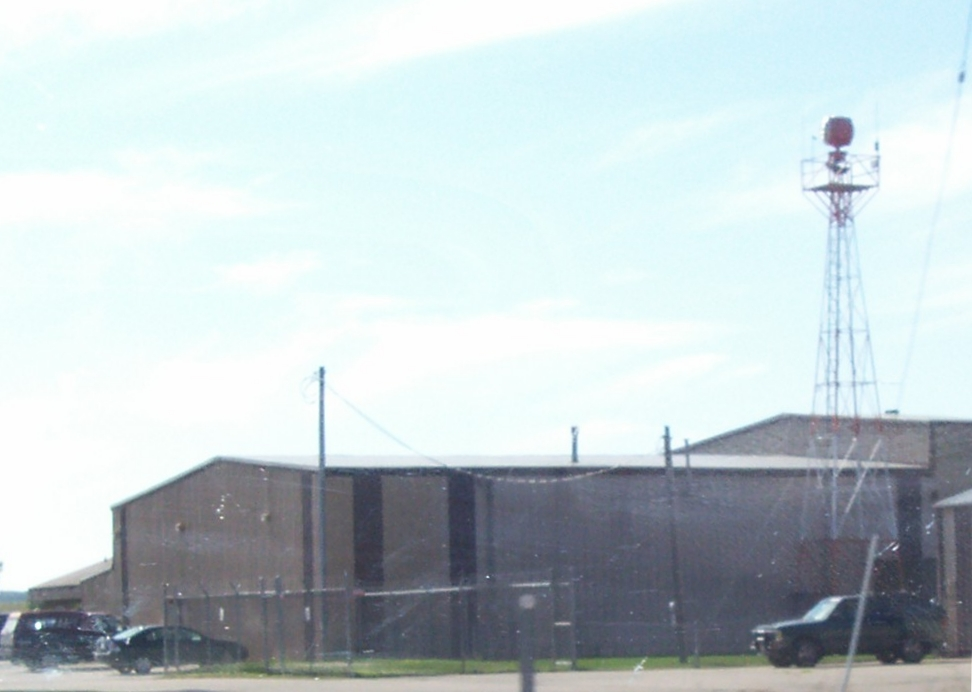
- IATA: none; ICAO: KPCZ; FAA LID: PCZ

Summary
- Airport type: Public
- Owner/Operator: City of Waupaca
- Serves: Waupaca, Wisconsin
- Opened: November 1944
- Time zone: CST (UTC−06:00)
  - Summer (DST): CDT (UTC−05:00)
- Elevation AMSL: 840 ft (260 m)
- Coordinates: 44°20′00″N 089°01′11″W
- Website: CityOfWaupaca.org/...

Map
- Location of airport in Wisconsin PCZ (the United States)

Runways
Direction	Length		Surface
Direction	ft	m	Surface
10/28	5,200	1,585	Asphalt
13/31	3,899	1,188	Asphalt

Statistics
- Aircraft operations (2022): 20,160
- Based aircraft (2024): 49
- Sources: FAA, Wisconsin DOT, and airport website

Waupaca Municipal Airport (ICAO: KPCZ, FAA LID: PCZ) is a city owned public use airport located three nautical miles (6 km) southeast of the central business district of Waupaca, a city in Waupaca County, Wisconsin, United States. The airport is also known as Brunner Field, which opened in November 1944. It is located adjacent to U.S. Route 10. It is included in the Federal Aviation Administration (FAA) National Plan of Integrated Airport Systems for 2025–2029, in which it is categorized as a local general aviation facility.

Although most U.S. airports use the same three-letter location identifier for the FAA and IATA, this airport is assigned PCZ by the FAA but has no designation from the IATA.

== Facilities and aircraft ==
Waupaca Municipal Airport covers an area of 386 acres (156 ha) at an elevation of 840 feet (256 m) above mean sea level. It has two asphalt paved runways: the primary runway 10/28 is 5,200 by 100 feet (1,585 x 30 m) with approved GPS approaches and the crosswind runway 13/31 is 3,899 by 75 feet (1,188 x 23 m).

KlattAero, LLC. is the fixed-base operator and also provides aircraft maintenance and inspections. Flight instruction and aircraft rentals are also available at the airport.

For the 12-month period ending September 14, 2022, the airport had 20,160 aircraft operations, an average of 55 per day: 99% general aviation, 1% air taxi and less than 1% military. In August 2024, there were 49 aircraft based at this airport: 43 single-engine, 4 multi-engine and 2 jet.

== Images ==
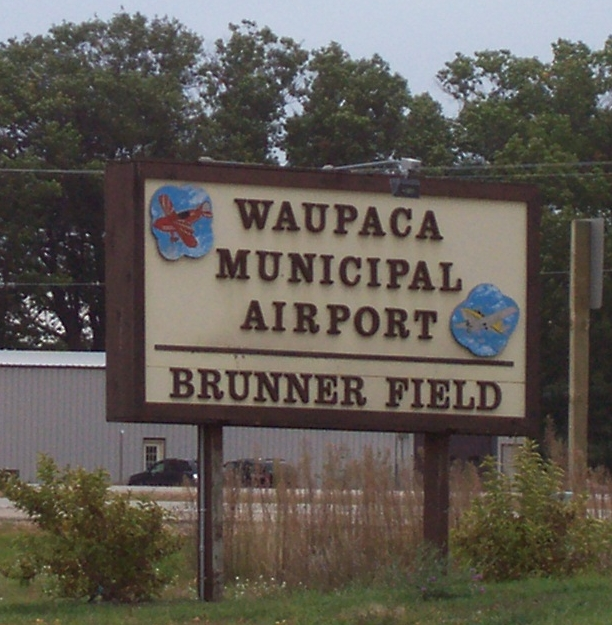
Entrance sign

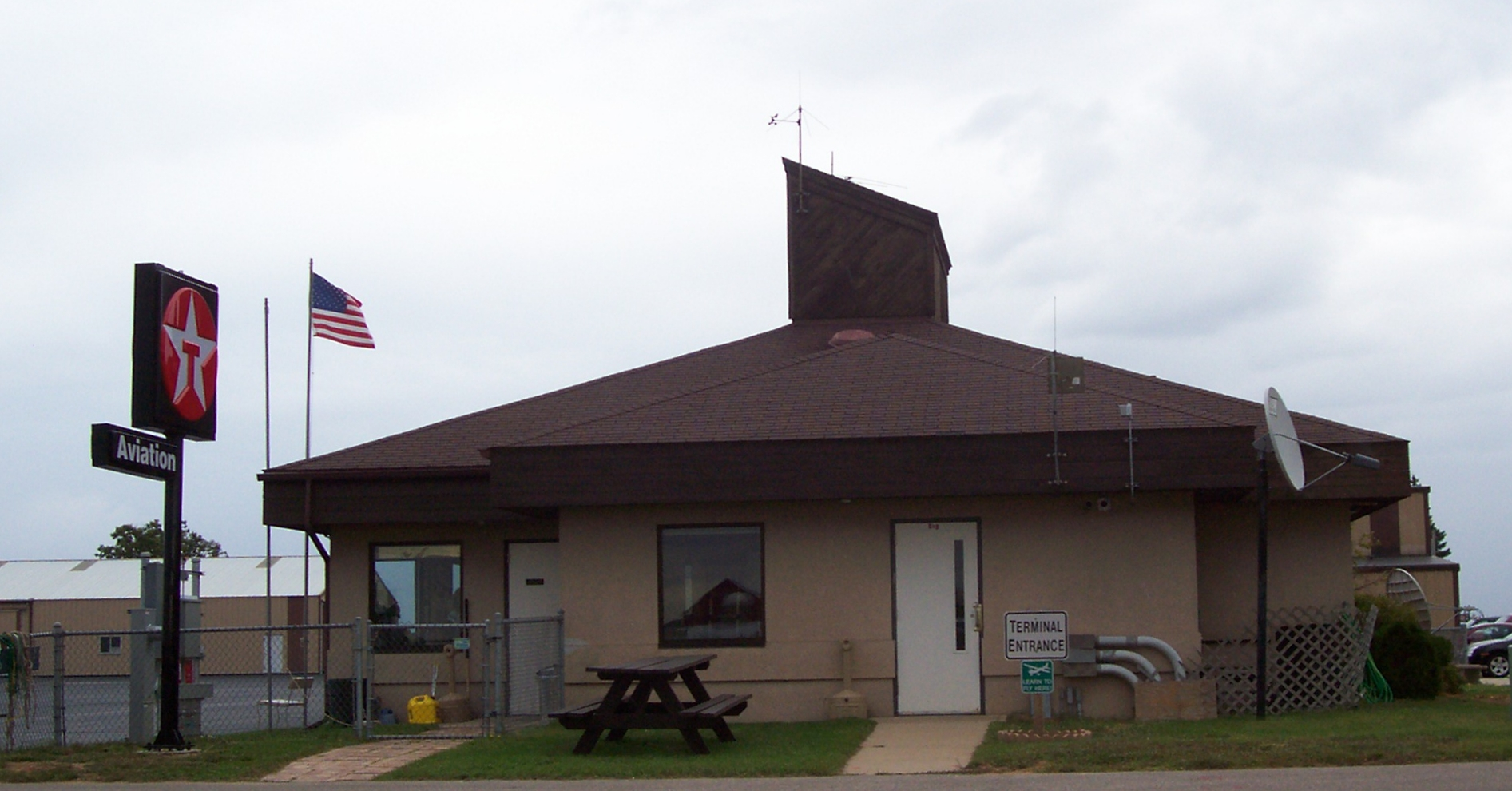
Terminal

== See also ==
- List of airports in Wisconsin
