= William Trinke =

American politician

Member of the Wisconsin Senate from the 22nd district
- In office 1949–1959
- Preceded by: Conrad Shearer
- Succeeded by: Earl D. Morton

Personal details
- Born: January 25, 1897 Lake Geneva, Wisconsin
- Died: September 25, 1982 (aged 85)
- Party: Republican
- Website: Official bio

William Trinke (January 25, 1897 – September 25, 1982) was an American lawyer and realtor from Lake Geneva, Wisconsin, and partner in the firm, Trinke and (John) Raup.

Trinke served in the United States Army in Europe during World War I. He was wounded in the hip. He received his bachelor's degree and law degrees from University of Wisconsin–Madison. He served in the Wisconsin State Senate from 1949 to 1959 as a Republican from Lake Geneva, Wisconsin.
