= James L. Callan =

American politician

Member of the Wisconsin Senate from the 9th district
- In office January 7, 1935 – January 2, 1939
- Preceded by: Irving P. Mehigan
- Succeeded by: Cornelius T. Young

Personal details
- Born: James Lawrence Callan; June 3, 1910 Milwaukee, Wisconsin, U.S.
- Died: November 26, 1991 (aged 81) Elm Grove, Wisconsin, U.S.
- Party: Democratic
- Occupation: Politician

James Lawrence Callan (June 3, 1910 – November 26, 1991) was an American politician.

== Early life ==
James L. Callan was born on June 3, 1910, in Milwaukee, Wisconsin. He went to the Marquette University High School and Marquette University.

== Career ==
Callan became a real estate and security broker in 1931. From 1935 to 1939, Callan served in the Wisconsin State Senate and was a Democrat.

== Death ==
Callan died in Elm Grove, Wisconsin.
