= Waupaca, Wisconsin =

- City
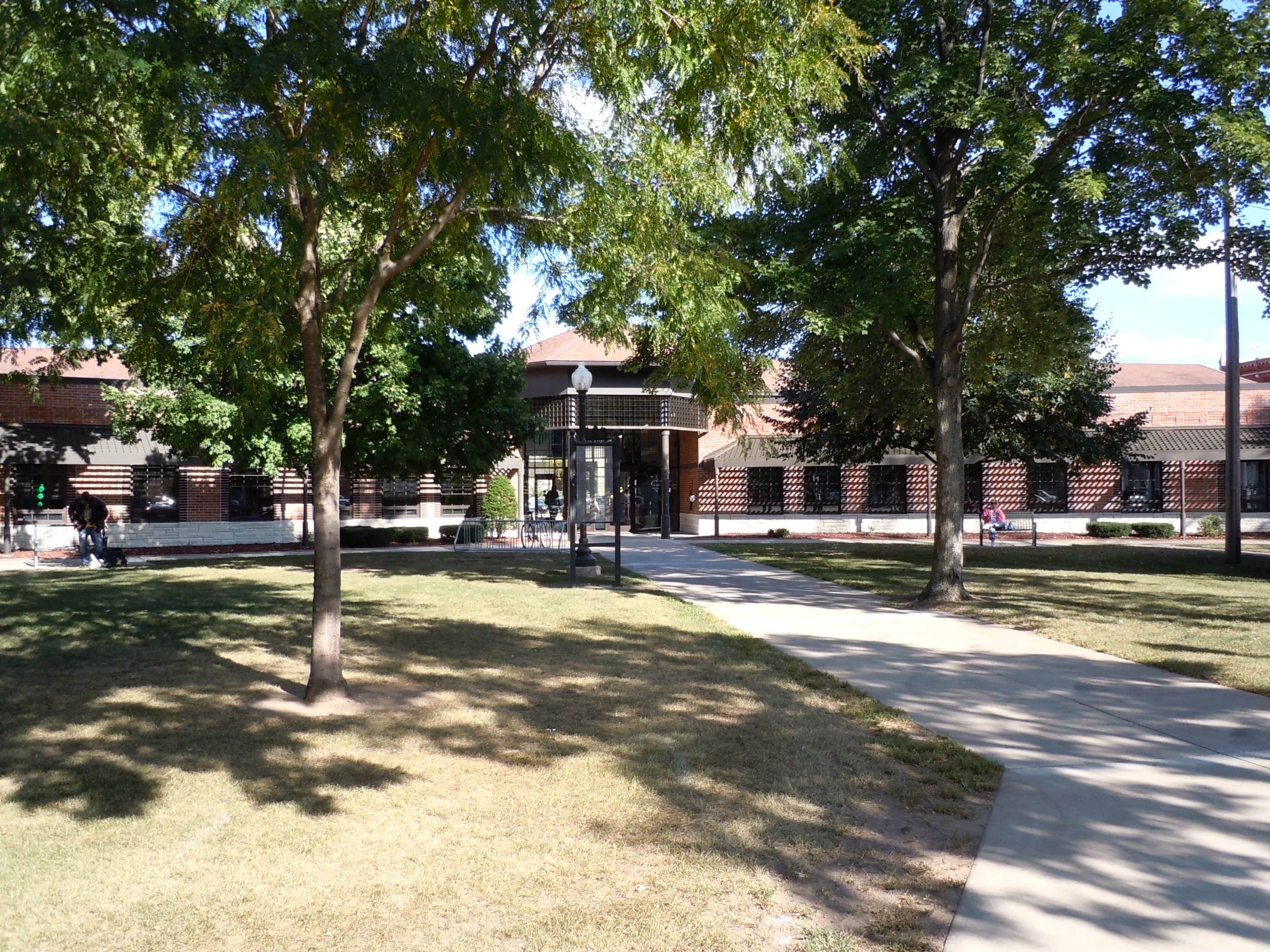
- Waupaca City Hall/Library Building

- Location of Waupaca in Waupaca County, Wisconsin.

- Location within Wisconsin Location within the United States
- Coordinates: 44°21′18″N 89°4′54″W
- Country: United States
- State: Wisconsin
- County: Waupaca

Area
  - Total: 8.21 sq mi (21.27 km^{2})
  - Land: 7.92 sq mi (20.51 km^{2})
  - Water: 0.29 sq mi (0.75 km^{2})

Population (2020)
  - Total: 6,282
  - Density: 793.2/sq mi (306.3/km^{2})
- Time zone: UTC-6 (Central (CST))
  - Summer (DST): UTC-5 (CDT)
- ZIP code: 54981
- Area codes: 715 & 534
- FIPS code: 55-84375
- Website: https://cityofwaupaca.org/

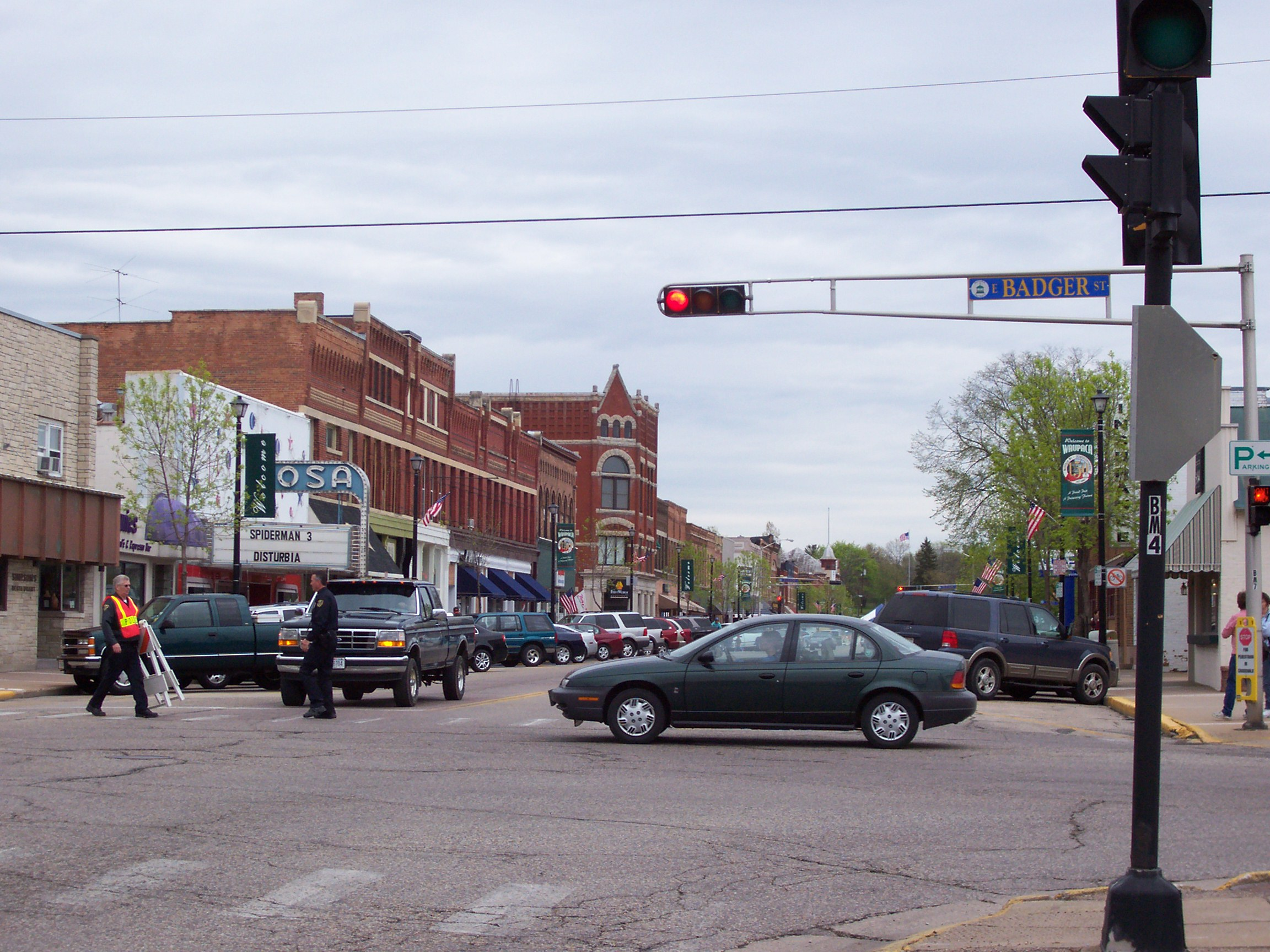
Looking north at Waupaca during sesquicentennial celebration on May 5, 2007

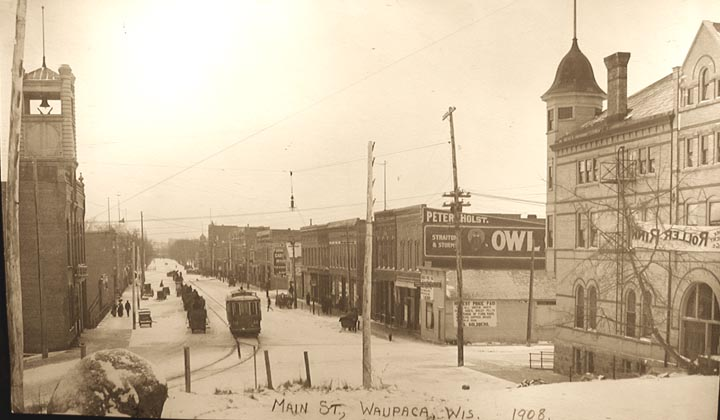
Looking south at downtown Waupaca in 1908

Waupaca (/wəˈpækə/ wə-PAK-ə) is a city in and the county seat of Waupaca County, Wisconsin, United States. The population was 6,282 at the 2020 census.

The city is located mostly within the Town of Waupaca, and it is politically independent of the town. A portion extends west into the adjacent Town of Farmington, and there is also a noncontiguous area of the city in the Town of Lind to the south. The city is divided into natural areas, city areas, and industrial areas.

== History ==
Native American mound builders lived in the area prior to European settlement. At one time there were 72 earthwork mounds in the area, some of them ancient prehistoric works.

“Waupaca” is an Menominee word, Wāpahkoh, which means Place of Tomorrow Seen Clearly. For more than 10,000 years, the Menominee occupied about 10 million acres, including Waupaca and the Chain O’Lakes area. The Menominee in the Waupaca area moved between large villages on Taylor and Otter Lakes and camps along the falls on the Waupaca River.

In a series of seven treaties, the Menominee ceded their lands to the United States. The final treaty, in 1848, relinquished the last of the Menominee's land, which included Waupaca.

The first white settlers, five men from Vermont, came to Waupaca looking for “the falls” in 1849. The settlers made camp near the end of what is now North Main Street with plans to harness the power of the falls and establish a community.

By 1852, a post office had been established and the settlement was officially named Waupaca. Waupaca was incorporated as a village on May 4, 1857, by an act of the Wisconsin State Legislature. This act was repealed on April 7, 1862, but revived on June 17 of the same year. Waupaca was incorporated as a city by the legislature on March 5, 1875.

Beginning in the 1960s and continuing to the present, the city has expanded its population and area through annexation.

== Geography ==
Waupaca is located at 44°21′17″N 89°4′54″W (44.354922, -89.081775).

According to the United States Census Bureau, the city has a total area of 8.21 square miles (21.3 km^{2}), of which 7.92 square miles (20.5 km^{2}) is land and 0.29 square miles (0.75 km^{2}) is water.

=== Climate ===
Climate data for Waupaca, Wisconsin, 1991–2020 normals, extremes 1896–present
Month	Jan	Feb	Mar	Apr	May	Jun	Jul	Aug	Sep	Oct	Nov	Dec	Year
Record high °F (°C)	60 (16)	73 (23)	84 (29)	92 (33)	102 (39)	103 (39)	106 (41)	105 (41)	99 (37)	90 (32)	77 (25)	64 (18)	106 (41)
Mean maximum °F (°C)	44.3 (6.8)	49.0 (9.4)	64.4 (18.0)	78.1 (25.6)	86.5 (30.3)	91.1 (32.8)	92.4 (33.6)	90.6 (32.6)	85.9 (29.9)	78.1 (25.6)	62.0 (16.7)	47.6 (8.7)	94.6 (34.8)
Mean daily maximum °F (°C)	25.1 (−3.8)	29.2 (−1.6)	41.3 (5.2)	55.1 (12.8)	68.2 (20.1)	77.4 (25.2)	82.0 (27.8)	79.5 (26.4)	71.7 (22.1)	57.9 (14.4)	43.1 (6.2)	30.2 (−1.0)	55.1 (12.8)
Daily mean °F (°C)	16.3 (−8.7)	19.8 (−6.8)	31.3 (−0.4)	43.9 (6.6)	56.6 (13.7)	66.1 (18.9)	70.4 (21.3)	68.4 (20.2)	60.3 (15.7)	47.4 (8.6)	34.4 (1.3)	22.4 (−5.3)	44.8 (7.1)
Mean daily minimum °F (°C)	7.6 (−13.6)	10.4 (−12.0)	21.3 (−5.9)	32.7 (0.4)	44.9 (7.2)	54.7 (12.6)	58.8 (14.9)	57.2 (14.0)	48.9 (9.4)	36.9 (2.7)	25.8 (−3.4)	14.5 (−9.7)	34.5 (1.4)
Mean minimum °F (°C)	−12.6 (−24.8)	−9.1 (−22.8)	0.2 (−17.7)	19.6 (−6.9)	30.8 (−0.7)	41.8 (5.4)	48.9 (9.4)	46.1 (7.8)	34.8 (1.6)	24.7 (−4.1)	11.4 (−11.4)	−5.8 (−21.0)	−16.4 (−26.9)
Record low °F (°C)	−38 (−39)	−41 (−41)	−26 (−32)	6 (−14)	17 (−8)	30 (−1)	40 (4)	32 (0)	18 (−8)	6 (−14)	−13 (−25)	−28 (−33)	−41 (−41)
Average precipitation inches (mm)	1.41 (36)	1.11 (28)	1.94 (49)	3.44 (87)	4.07 (103)	4.49 (114)	3.77 (96)	3.86 (98)	3.34 (85)	2.61 (66)	2.06 (52)	1.71 (43)	33.81 (857)
Average snowfall inches (cm)	10.9 (28)	11.9 (30)	7.0 (18)	4.7 (12)	0.1 (0.25)	0.0 (0.0)	0.0 (0.0)	0.0 (0.0)	0.0 (0.0)	0.3 (0.76)	2.1 (5.3)	12.3 (31)	49.3 (125.31)
Average precipitation days (≥ 0.01 in)	8.6	6.9	7.3	10.3	11.5	11.1	9.5	9.5	9.7	9.2	7.4	8.4	109.4
Average snowy days (≥ 0.1 in)	7.1	5.3	3.5	2.0	0.1	0.0	0.0	0.0	0.0	0.2	1.8	5.7	25.7
Source 1: NOAA
Source 2: National Weather Service

== Transportation ==
U.S. 10 Eastbound US 10 routes to Appleton. Westbound, US 10 routes to Stevens Point.
WIS 22 travels north to Clintonville and south to Wild Rose.
WIS 49 routes northbound to Iola. Southbound, it runs concurrent with US 10 and routes to Berlin.
WIS 54 travels east to New London and west to Wisconsin Rapids, Wisconsin.

From 1899 to 1926, streetcar service was provided by the Waupaca Electric Light and Railway Company.

=== Airport ===
- KPCZ - Waupaca Municipal Airport

== Demographics ==
Historical population
Census	Pop.	Note	%±
1880	1,392		—
1890	2,127		52.8%
1900	2,912		36.9%
1910	2,789		−4.2%
1920	2,839		1.8%
1930	3,131		10.3%
1940	3,458		10.4%
1950	3,921		13.4%
1960	3,984		1.6%
1970	4,342		9.0%
1980	4,472		3.0%
1990	4,957		10.8%
2000	5,676		14.5%
2010	6,069		6.9%
2020	6,282		3.5%
U.S. Decennial Census

=== 2020 census ===
As of the 2020 census, Waupaca had a population of 6,282. The population density was 793.2 inhabitants per square mile (306.3/km^{2}). The median age was 41.4 years. 20.4% of residents were under the age of 18 and 22.8% were 65 years of age or older. For every 100 females, there were 94.7 males, and for every 100 females age 18 and over, there were 91.8 males.

94.3% of residents lived in urban areas, while 5.7% lived in rural areas.

There were 2,813 households, of which 23.6% had children under the age of 18 living in them. Of all households, 34.3% were married-couple households, 23.5% had a male householder and no spouse or partner present, and 33.3% had a female householder and no spouse or partner present. About 42.4% of all households were made up of individuals, and 19.6% had someone living alone who was 65 years of age or older.

There were 3,066 housing units at an average density of 387.1 units per square mile (149.5 units/km^{2}). Of all housing units, 8.3% were vacant. The homeowner vacancy rate was 1.6% and the rental vacancy rate was 7.9%.

Racial composition as of the 2020 census
Race	Number	Percent
White	5,734	91.3%
Black or African American	67	1.1%
American Indian and Alaska Native	35	0.6%
Asian	64	1.0%
Native Hawaiian and Other Pacific Islander	3	0.0%
Some other race	87	1.4%
Two or more races	292	4.6%
Hispanic or Latino (of any race)	250	4.0%

=== 2010 census ===
As of the census of 2010, there were 6,069 people, 2,702 households, and 1,356 families residing in the city. The population density was 776.1 inhabitants per square mile (299.7/km^{2}). There were 2,996 housing units at an average density of 383.1 units per square mile (147.9 units/km^{2}). The racial makeup of the city was 96.6% White, 0.9% African American, 0.7% Native American, 0.3% Asian, 0.5% from other races, and 1.0% from two or more races. Hispanic or Latino of any race were 2.3% of the population.

There were 2,702 households, of which 25.9% had children under the age of 18 living with them, 34.9% were married couples living together, 10.9% had a female householder with no husband present, 4.4% had a male householder with no wife present, and 49.8% were non-families. 42.9% of all households were made up of individuals, and 20.7% had someone living alone who was 65 years of age or older. The average household size was 2.10 and the average family size was 2.92.

The median age in the city was 40.1 years. 22.1% of residents were under the age of 18; 8.4% were between the ages of 18 and 24; 24.7% were from 25 to 44; 24.6% were from 45 to 64; and 20.1% were 65 years of age or older. The gender makeup of the city was 47.5% male and 52.5% female.

=== 2000 census ===
At the 2000 census, there were 5,676 people, 2,364 households and 1,302 families residing in the city. The population density was 947.0 people per square mile (365.6 people/km^{2}). There were 2,543 housing units at an average density of 424.3 units per square mile (163.8 units/km^{2}). The racial makeup of the city was 96.26% White, 0.33% Black or African American, 0.86% Native American, 0.25% Asian, 0.02% Pacific Islander, 1.39% from other races, and 0.88% from two or more races. 3.42% of the population were Hispanic or Latino of any race.

There were 2,364 households, of which 29.5% had children under the age of 18 living with them, 40.5% were married couples living together, 10.6% had a female householder with no husband present, and 44.9% were non-families. 38.1% of all households were made up of individuals, and 18.2% had someone living alone who was 65 years of age or older. The average household size was 2.25 and the average family size was 3.01.

Age distribution was 25.4% under the age of 18, 9.5% from 18 to 24, 27.0% from 25 to 44, 17.9% from 45 to 64, and 20.2% who were 65 years of age or older. The median age was 36 years. For every 100 females, there were 88.2 males. For every 100 females age 18 and over, there were 84.9 males.

The median household income was $31,095, and the median family income was $45,128. Males had a median income of $32,488 versus $21,651 for females. The per capita income for the city was $18,890. About 7.1% of families and 10.5% of the population were below the poverty line, including 12.9% of those under age 18 and 12.0% of those age 65 or over.

== Business and industry ==
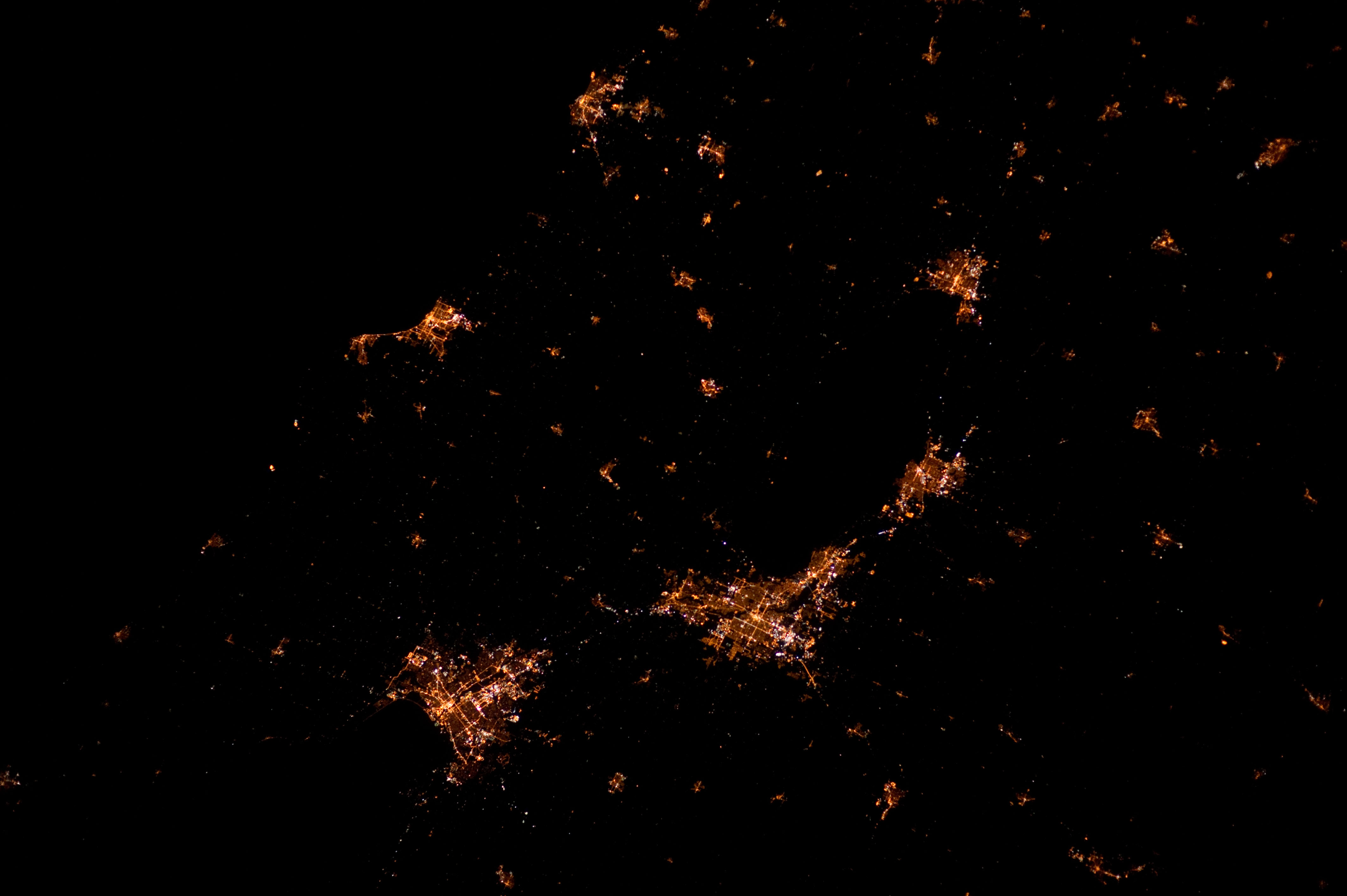
Waupaca, taken at 3:09:47 A.M. CDT on March 28, 2012 from an altitude of 211 nautical miles (391 km) during ISS Expedition 30.

Waupaca Foundry is the largest employer in the city, employing over 1500 workers in three plants in or around the city. Most of the employees live within 20 miles (32 km) of the city. Gusmer Enterprises, Inc., with a manufacturing plant on Ware Street, produces products for the food and beverage, industrial and pharmaceutical markets.

== Notable people ==
- Edward E. Browne, United States Representative
- Edward L. Browne, legislator
- Daniel F. Burnham, legislator
- George H. Calkins, legislator and physician
- Clarence Ekstrom, U.S. Navy Vice Admiral
- Fred R. Fisher, legislator
- Robert Frederick Froehlke, lawyer and government official
- Brock Jensen, NFL quarterback
- Greg Johnson, curler
- Edwin J. Larson, legislator
- Alfred R. Lea, legislator
- Reid F. Murray, United States Representative
- Clay Perry, writer, coined the word "spelunker"
- Kevin David Petersen, legislator
- Brian Rafalski, NHL defensemen
- Richard E. Peterson, legislator, lawyer
- Myron Reed, legislator, lawyer
- Lyall Schwarzkopf, Minnesota state legislator
- Milan H. Sessions, legislator, lawyer
- Joseph H. Woodnorth, legislator

== Sister cities ==
Waupaca has two sister cities:

- Hochheim am Main, Hesse, Germany
- Mitoyo, Kagawa Prefecture, Japan

== Images ==
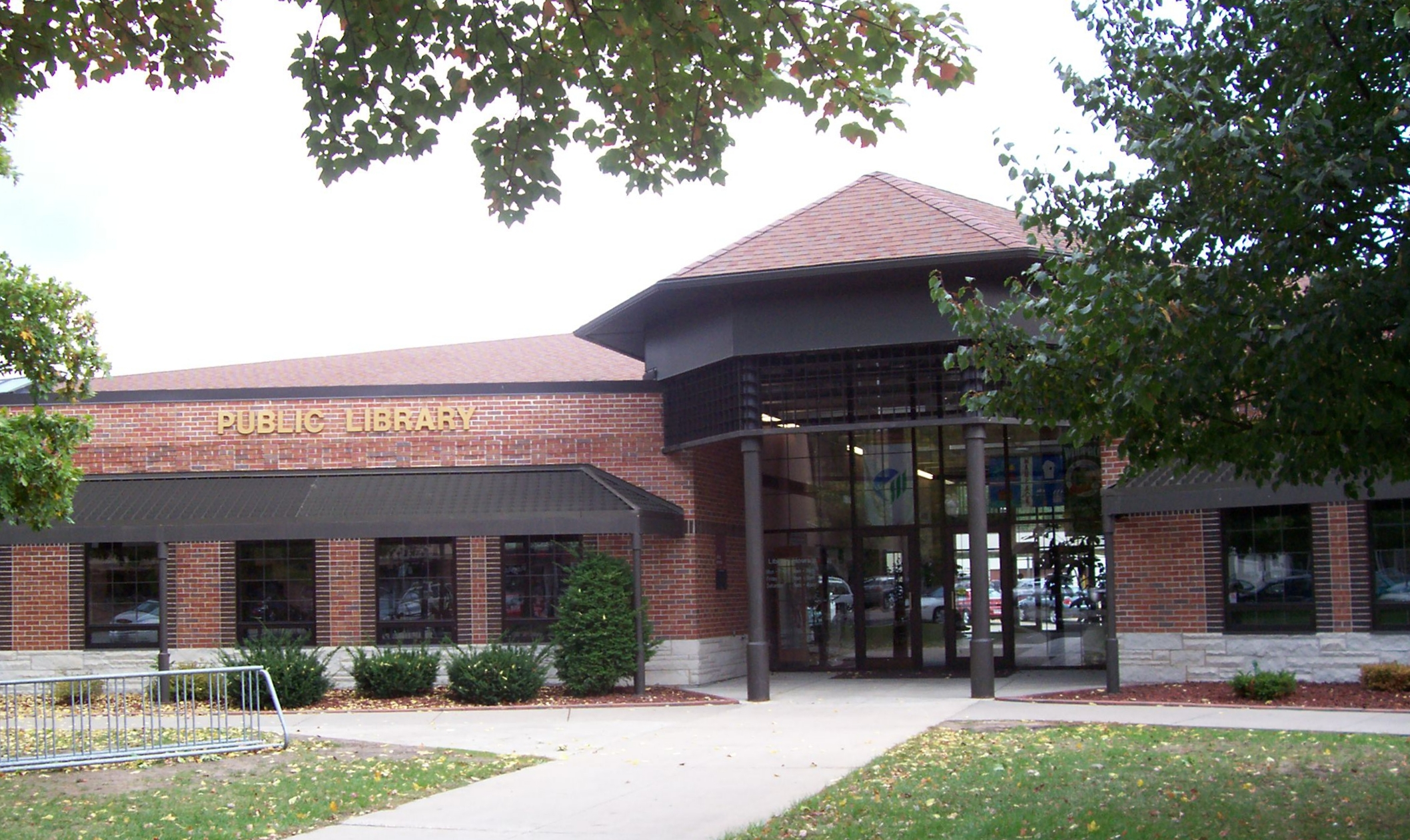
Library

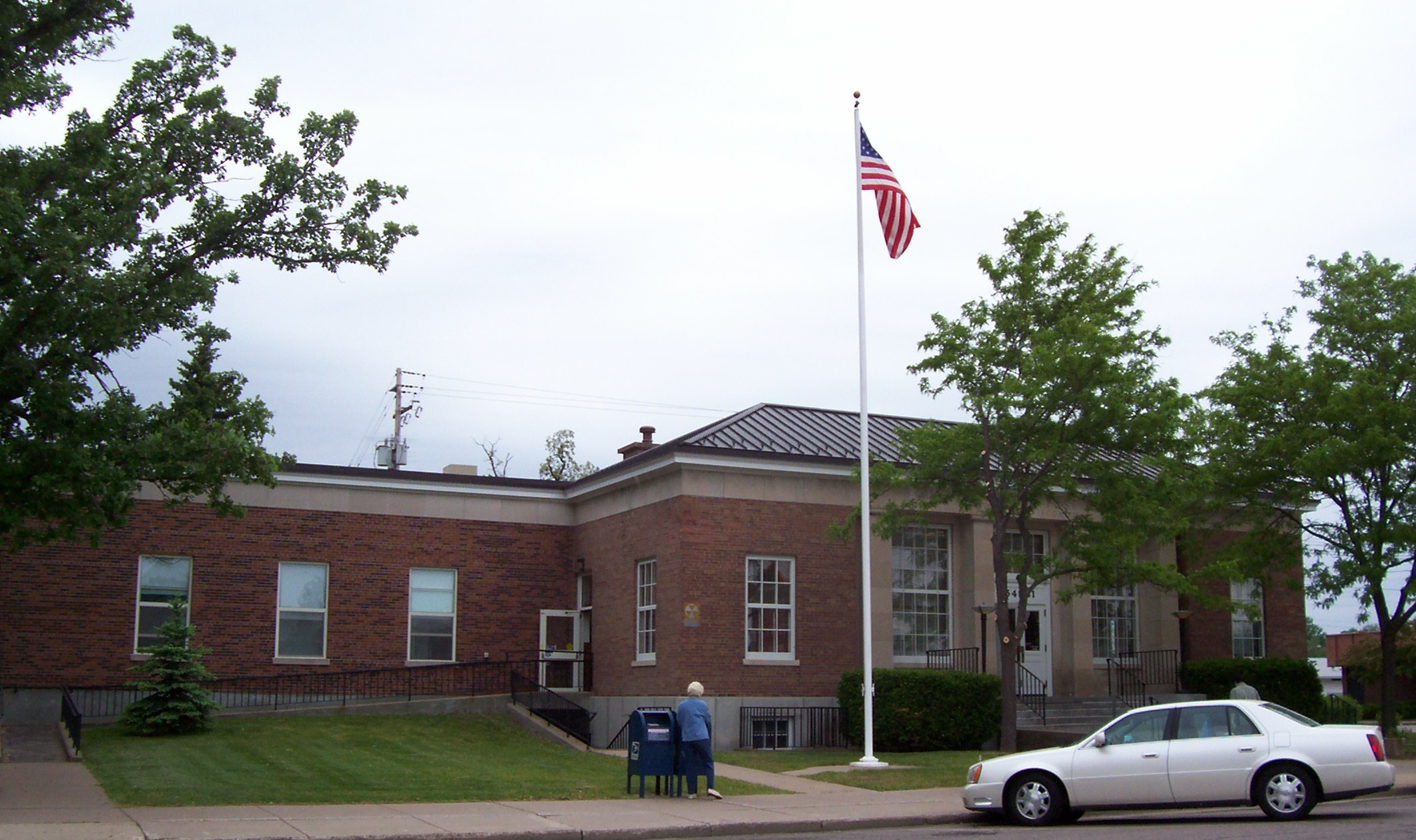
Waupaca Post Office, listed on the National Register of Historic Places

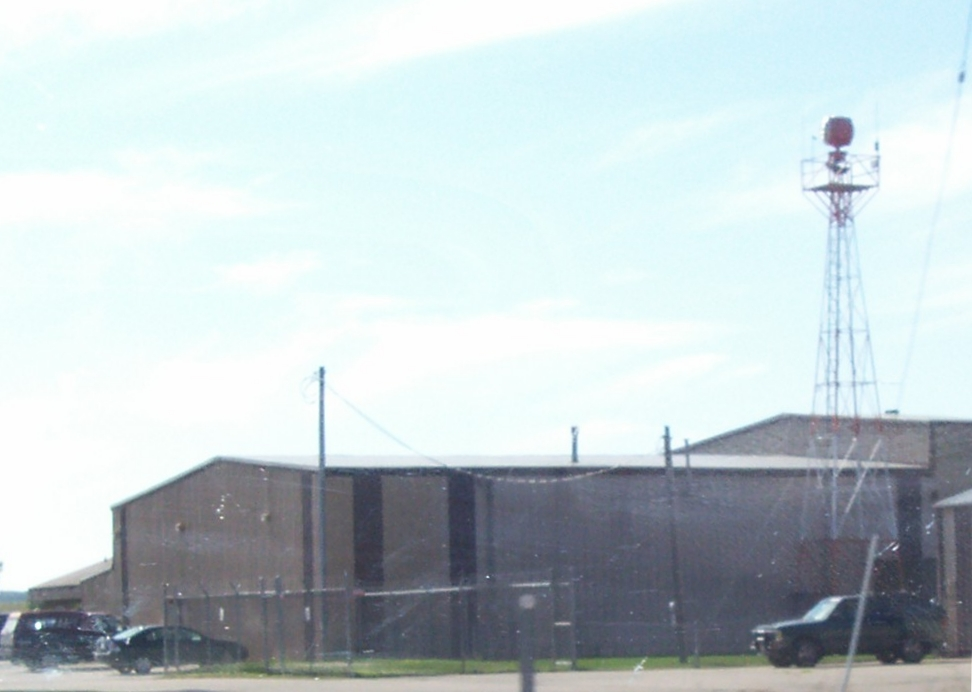
Waupaca Municipal Airport

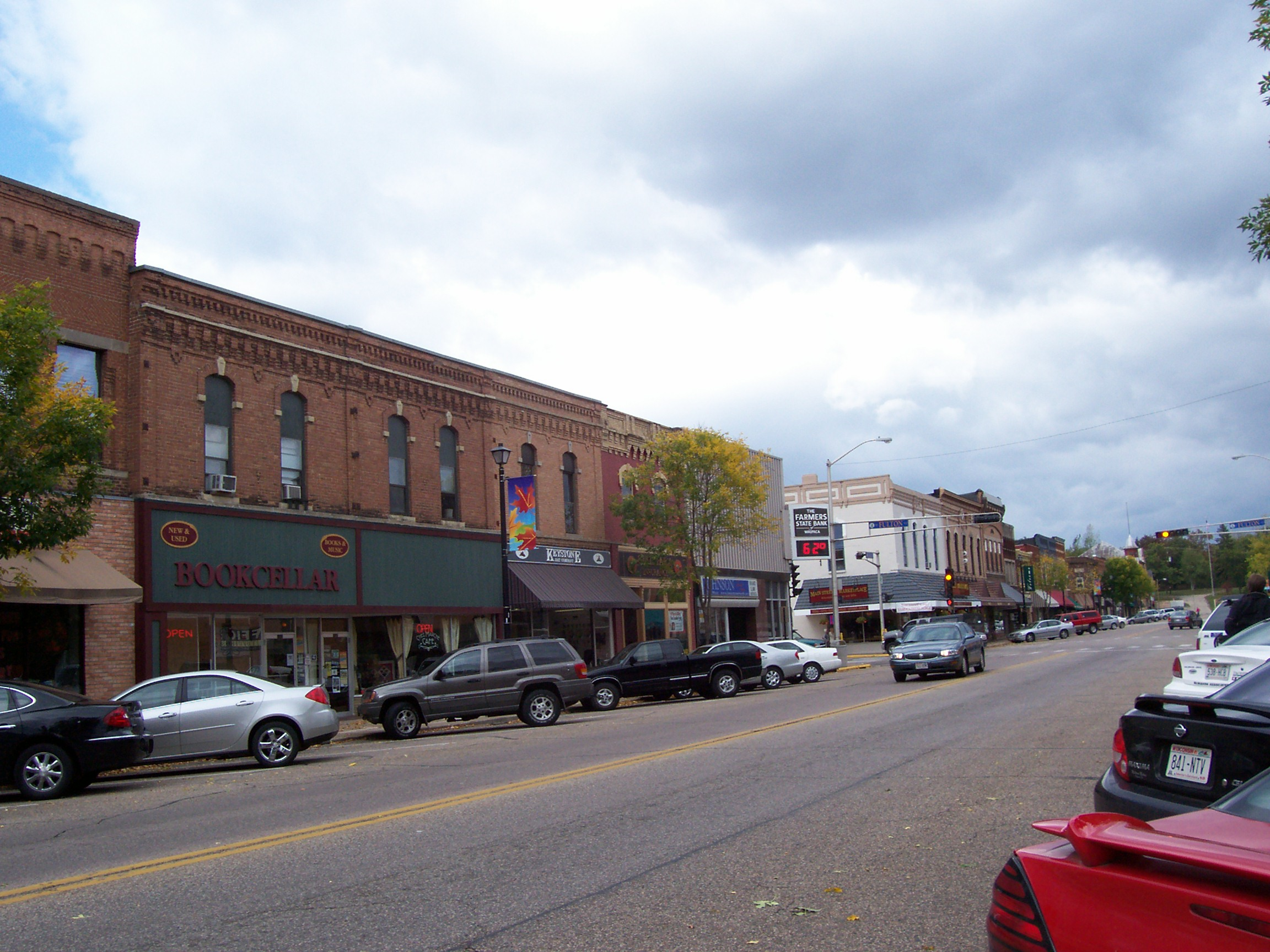
A portion of the Main Street Historic District, listed on the National Register of Historic Places

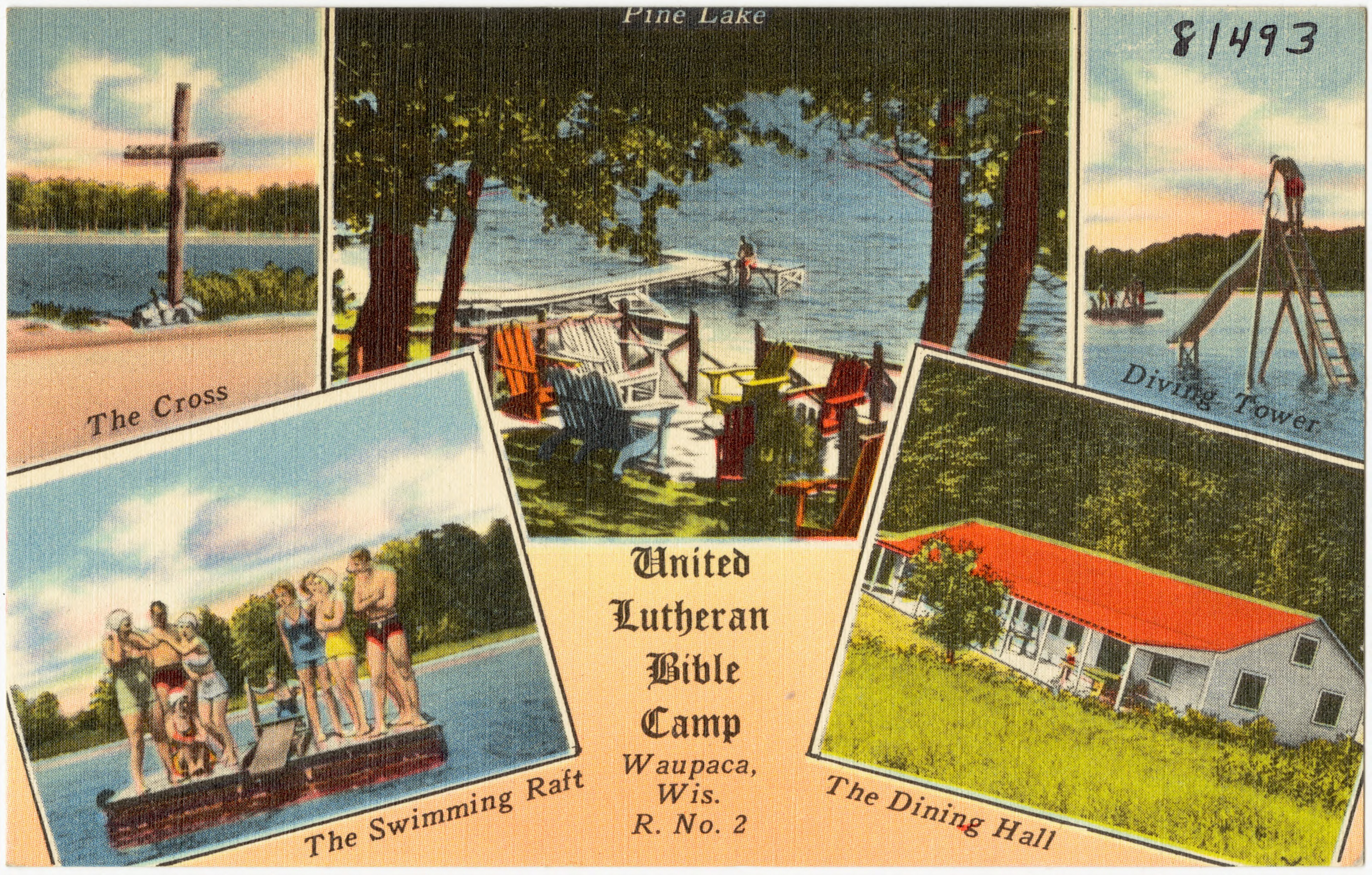
Postcard from c. 1930—1945 for Pine Lake Camp

== See also ==
Waupaca Railroad Depot

== See also ==
- Waupaca High School
