= National Register of Historic Places listings in San Miguel County, New Mexico =

Location of San Miguel County in New Mexico

This is a list of the National Register of Historic Places listings in San Miguel County, New Mexico.

This is intended to be a complete list of the properties and districts on the National Register of Historic Places in San Miguel County, New Mexico, United States. Latitude and longitude coordinates are provided for many National Register properties and districts; these locations may be seen together in a map.

There are 103 properties and districts listed on the National Register in the county, including 1 National Historic Landmark of which 1 is also a National Monument. Another 3 properties were once listed but have since been removed. All of the places within the county currently or formerly on the National Register are also recorded on the State Register of Cultural Properties.

This National Park Service list is complete through NPS recent listings posted August 28, 2026.

Contents: NRHP in New Mexico by county
Bernalillo – Catron – Chaves – Cibola – Colfax – Curry – De Baca – Doña Ana – Eddy – Grant – Guadalupe – Harding – Hidalgo – Lea – Lincoln – Los Alamos – Luna – McKinley – Mora – Otero – Quay – Rio Arriba – Roosevelt – San Juan – San Miguel – Sandoval – Santa Fe – Sierra – Socorro – Taos – Torrance – Union – Valencia

== Current listings ==
	Name on the Register	Image	Date listed	Location	City or town	Description
1	Acequia Madre		March 19, 1987 (#87001118)	Roughly from the Gallinas River to the intersection of S. Pacific and U.S. Route 85; 35°35′05″N 105°13′26″W	Las Vegas	
2	Arturo Angel House	Arturo Angel House	September 26, 1985 (#85002604)	926 S. Pacific; 35°35′12″N 105°13′22″W	Las Vegas	
3	E. N. Charles and Lewis Arthur House	E. N. Charles and Lewis Arthur House	September 26, 1985 (#85002605)	Douglas Ave. 35°35′37″N 105°13′02″W	Las Vegas	
4	AT & SF Roundhouse	AT & SF Roundhouse	September 26, 1985 (#85002621)	Northeast of Grand Ave. 35°35′12″N 105°12′53″W	Las Vegas	
5	Baca-Korte House		September 26, 1985 (#85002658)	615 S. Pacific; 35°34′58″N 105°13′15″W	Las Vegas	
6	Bean-Newlee House	Bean-Newlee House	September 26, 1985 (#85002625)	1045 5th St. 35°36′04″N 105°13′04″W	Las Vegas	
7	Bell Ranch Headquarters		October 6, 1970 (#70000407)	North and east of the Conchas Reservoir; 35°31′46″N 104°06′00″W	Tucumcari	
8	Bridge Street Historic District	Bridge Street Historic District	July 26, 1978 (#78001824)	100 block of Bridge St. 35°35′36″N 105°13′27″W	Las Vegas	
9	Building at 1202 9th Street		September 26, 1985 (#85002632)	1202 9th St. 35°36′02″N 105°13′20″W	Las Vegas	
10	Building at 1214 Bridge	Building at 1214 Bridge	September 26, 1985 (#85002660)	1214 Bridge; 35°35′41″N 105°13′22″W	Las Vegas	
11	Building at 2005 Montezuma		September 26, 1985 (#85002655)	2005 Montezuma; 35°35′31″N 105°13′57″W	Las Vegas	
12	Building at 1406 Romero		September 26, 1985 (#85002656)	1406 Romero; 35°35′15″N 105°13′51″W	Las Vegas	
13	Lowery Clevenger House	Lowery Clevenger House	September 26, 1985 (#85002594)	1013 2nd 35°36′05″N 105°12′49″W	Las Vegas	
14	Conchas Dam Historic District		May 22, 2005 (#05000454)	Roughly bounded by the State Park South Area, State Park North Area, Conchas Reservoir, and Bell Ranch; 35°23′00″N 104°11′47″W	Conchas Dam	
15	James Cook House	James Cook House	September 26, 1985 (#85002647)	1017 11th 35°35′49″N 105°13′23″W	Las Vegas	
16	Distrito de las Escuelas	Distrito de las Escuelas	March 18, 1980 (#80002567)	S. Pacific and S. Gonzales Sts. 35°35′32″N 105°13′31″W	Las Vegas	
17	Douglas Avenue School	Douglas Avenue School	August 5, 1983 (#83001625)	900 Douglas Ave. 35°35′35″N 105°13′06″W	Las Vegas	
18	Douglas-Sixth Street Historic District	Douglas-Sixth Street Historic District	July 21, 1983 (#83001626)	Roughly bounded by Grand, Lincoln, and 7th Sts., and University Ave. 35°35′41″N 105°12′14″W	Las Vegas	
19	Eldorado Hotel	Eldorado Hotel	September 26, 1985 (#85002626)	514 Grand; 35°35′39″N 105°12′48″W	Las Vegas	
20	First Baptist Church	First Baptist Church	September 26, 1985 (#85002612)	700 University; 35°35′44″N 105°13′02″W	Las Vegas	
21	Eugenio Gatignole House		September 26, 1985 (#85002606)	1114 S. Gonzales; 35°35′18″N 105°13′24″W	Las Vegas	
22	Esperansa Herrera House		September 26, 1985 (#85002613)	2231 Church; 35°35′41″N 105°13′51″W	Las Vegas	
23	House at 913 2nd	House at 913 2nd	September 26, 1985 (#85002597)	913 2nd 35°36′01″N 105°12′47″W	Las Vegas	southernmost of three adjacent houses, listed together
24	House at 915 2nd	House at 915 2nd	September 26, 1985 (#85002596)	915 2nd 35°36′02″N 105°12′48″W	Las Vegas	Middle one of three adjacent houses, listed together. Free Classic in design, identical in plan to House at 919 2nd.
25	House at 919 2nd	House at 919 2nd	September 26, 1985 (#85002595)	919 2nd 35°36′02″N 105°12′48″W	Las Vegas	northernmost of three adjacent houses, listed together. Free Classic in design, identical in plan to House at 915 2nd.
26	House at 1513 8th	House at 1513 8th	September 26, 1985 (#85002634)	1513 8th 35°36′19″N 105°13′30″W	Las Vegas	
27	House at 1616 8th	House at 1616 8th	September 26, 1985 (#85002645)	1616 8th 35°36′24″N 105°13′31″W	Las Vegas	
28	House at 1717 8th	House at 1717 8th	September 26, 1985 (#85002646)	1717 8th 35°36′29″N 105°13′36″W	Las Vegas	
29	House at 1114 10th		September 26, 1985 (#85002649)	1114 10th 35°35′53″N 105°13′16″W	Las Vegas	
30	House at 1007 11th Street	House at 1007 11th Street	September 26, 1985 (#85002648)	1007 11th St. 35°35′48″N 105°13′22″W	Las Vegas	
31	House at 821 12th	House at 821 12th	September 26, 1985 (#85002643)	821 12th 35°35′42″N 105°13′24″W	Las Vegas	
32	House at 933 12th	House at 933 12th	September 26, 1985 (#85002642)	933 12th 35°35′45″N 105°13′26″W	Las Vegas	
33	House at 921 Chavez		September 26, 1985 (#85002653)	921 Chavez; 35°35′09″N 105°13′27″W	Las Vegas	
34	House at 1116 Columbia	House at 1116 Columbia	September 26, 1985 (#85002641)	1116 Columbia; 35°35′44″N 105°13′23″W	Las Vegas	
35	House at 810 Douglas	House at 810 Douglas	September 26, 1985 (#85002603)	810 Douglas; 35°35′47″N 105°13′02″W	Las Vegas	
36	House at 812 Douglas	House at 812 Douglas	September 26, 1985 (#85002602)	812 Douglas; 35°35′39″N 105°13′02″W	Las Vegas	
37	House at 814 Douglas	House at 814 Douglas	September 26, 1985 (#85002601)	814 Douglas; 35°35′38″N 105°13′03″W	Las Vegas	No longer extant.
38	House at 818 Douglas	House at 818 Douglas	September 26, 1985 (#85002600)	818 Douglas; 35°35′38″N 105°13′03″W	Las Vegas	
39	House at 822 Douglas	House at 822 Douglas	September 26, 1985 (#85002599)	822 Douglas; 35°35′38″N 105°13′04″W	Las Vegas	
40	House at 12 Grand	House at 12 Grand	September 26, 1985 (#85002622)	12 Grand; 35°35′17″N 105°12′54″W	Las Vegas	
41	House at 16 Grand	House at 16 Grand	September 26, 1985 (#85002623)	16 Grand; 35°35′18″N 105°12′53″W	Las Vegas	
42	House at 613 Mora		September 26, 1985 (#85002650)	613 Mora; 35°35′45″N 105°14′02″W	Las Vegas	
43	House at 618 Mora		September 26, 1985 (#85002651)	618 Mora; 35°35′21″N 105°14′02″W	Las Vegas	
44	House at 2203 New Mexico		September 26, 1985 (#85002654)	2203 New Mexico; 35°35′40″N 105°13′57″W	Las Vegas	
45	House at 521 S. Pacific	House at 521 S. Pacific	September 26, 1985 (#85002659)	521 S. Pacific; 35°34′54″N 105°13′12″W	Las Vegas	
46	House at 921 S. Pacific		September 26, 1985 (#85002608)	921 S. Pacific; 35°35′10″N 105°13′22″W	Las Vegas	
47	House at 800 Pecos		September 26, 1985 (#85002633)	800 Pecos; 35°35′48″N 105°12′30″W	Las Vegas	
48	House at 931 Prince	House at 931 Prince	September 26, 1985 (#85002620)	931 Prince; 35°35′18″N 105°12′59″W	Las Vegas	
49	House at 119 Railroad		September 26, 1985 (#85002624)	119 Railroad; 35°35′20″N 105°12′51″W	Las Vegas	
50	House at 309 Railroad	House at 309 Railroad	September 26, 1985 (#85002628)	309 Railroad; 35°35′29″N 105°12′49″W	Las Vegas	
51	House at 733 Railroad	House at 733 Railroad	September 26, 1985 (#85002629)	733 Railroad; 35°35′52″N 105°12′45″W	Las Vegas	
52	House at 919 Railroad	House at 919 Railroad	September 26, 1985 (#85002630)	919 Railroad; 35°36′01″N 105°12′42″W	Las Vegas	
53	House at 1025 Railroad		September 26, 1985 (#85002631)	1025 Railroad; 35°36′06″N 105°12′39″W	Las Vegas	
54	House at 1221 San Francisco		September 26, 1985 (#85002644)	1221 San Francisco; 35°35′49″N 105°13′28″W	Las Vegas	
55	House at 2501 Taos Alley		September 26, 1985 (#85002652)	2501 Taos Alley; 35°35′48″N 105°14′05″W	Las Vegas	
56	House at 312 Tecolote	House at 312 Tecolote	September 26, 1985 (#85002609)	312 Tecolote; 35°35′10″N 105°13′25″W	Las Vegas	
57	House at 508 University	House at 508 University	September 26, 1985 (#85002611)	508 University; 35°35′47″N 105°12′54″W	Las Vegas	
58	House at 514 University	House at 514 University	September 26, 1985 (#85002610)	514 University; 35°35′47″N 105°12′55″W	Las Vegas	
59	Adele Ilfeld Auditorium	Adele Ilfeld Auditorium	January 8, 1980 (#80002568)	900 University Avenue; 35°35′41″N 105°13′11″W	Las Vegas	
60	Charles Ilfeld Memorial Chapel		September 26, 1985 (#85002657)	Colonias and Romero; 35°35′48″N 105°14′16″W	Las Vegas	
61	Johnsen House	Johnsen House	September 26, 1985 (#85002635)	1523 8th 35°36′20″N 105°13′31″W	Las Vegas	
62	Johnsen Mortuary	Johnsen Mortuary	September 26, 1985 (#85002607)	801 Douglas; 35°35′37″N 105°13′00″W	Las Vegas	
63	Norman L. King Memorial Stadium		September 17, 1999 (#99001172)	2.7 miles northwest of the junction of State Road 65 and Mill Ave. 35°36′40″N 105°15′31″W	Las Vegas	
64	Las Vegas Municipal Building	Las Vegas Municipal Building	October 24, 2007 (#07001107)	727 Grand Ave. 35°35′52″N 105°12′47″W	Las Vegas	
65	Las Vegas Plaza	Las Vegas Plaza	December 16, 1974 (#74001202)	Bounded by Valencia and Moreno Sts. and the rear property line of the building on Gonzales St. and Hot Springs Boulevard; 35°35′34″N 105°13′35″W	Las Vegas	
66	Las Vegas Railroad and Power Company Building		September 26, 1985 (#85002640)	12th and San Francisco; 35°35′52″N 105°13′25″W	Las Vegas	
67	Library Park Historic District	Library Park Historic District	March 12, 1979 (#79001549)	Liberty Park and environs 35°35′52″N 105°12′52″W	Las Vegas	
68	Lincoln Park Historic District	Lincoln Park Historic District	August 6, 1979 (#79001550)	7th, 8th, Lincoln and Jackson Sts; 35°35′33″N 105°12′57″W	Las Vegas	
69	Montezuma Hotel Complex	Montezuma Hotel Complex	May 3, 1974 (#74001203)	6 miles northwest of Las Vegas in Gallinas Canyon; 35°39′15″N 105°16′53″W	Las Vegas	
70	Nolan House		September 26, 1985 (#85002619)	110 10th St. 35°35′18″N 105°12′57″W	Las Vegas	Appears to be extant even though the NMSRCP # 1053 says it was demolished. The address is 109 10th St. per the photo in the NRHP nomination form.
71	North New Town Historic District	North New Town Historic District	August 18, 1983 (#83001627)	Roughly bounded by National, Friedman, 3rd, and 8th Sts. 35°35′58″N 105°13′05″W	Las Vegas	
72	Old Las Vegas Post Office	Old Las Vegas Post Office	September 26, 1985 (#85002598)	901 Douglas; 35°35′36″N 105°13′05″W	Las Vegas	
73	Old Town Residential Historic District	Old Town Residential Historic District	October 28, 1983 (#83004161)	Roughly bounded by Perey St. to Mills Ave., and from New Mexico to Gonzales St. 35°35′31″N 105°13′42″W	Las Vegas	
74	Our Lady of Sorrows Church	Our Lady of Sorrows Church	September 8, 1976 (#76001197)	W. National Ave. 35°35′31″N 105°13′43″W	Las Vegas	
75	Park Springs Ranch Headquarters Complex		November 28, 2008 (#08001137)	11.6 miles east of junction US 84 and NM 451; 35°15′56″N 104°55′49″W	Dilia	
76	Pecos National Historical Park	Pecos National Historical Park	October 15, 1966 (#66000485)	State Road 63 southwest of its junction with State Road 50; 35°33′00″N 105°41′04″W	Pecos	Main portion in this county was designated a National Historic Landmark District on July 2, 1991. Glorieta Pass Battlefield portion of park is in Santa Fe County.
77	Pecos National Historical Park Archaeological and Historic District	Pecos National Historical Park Archaeological and Historic District	September 22, 2022 (#100003052)	Address restricted	Pecos vicinity	
78	Pecos River Bridge at Terrero	Pecos River Bridge at Terrero	July 15, 1997 (#97000739)	State Road 63 over the Pecos River; 35°44′26″N 105°40′40″W	Terrero	
79	Pendaries Grist Mill		February 2, 1979 (#79001552)	1 mile (1.6 km) east of Rociada off State Road 105; 35°50′35″N 105°23′45″W	Rociada	
80	Pimter-O'Neil Rooming House	Pimter-O'Neil Rooming House	September 26, 1985 (#85002627)	313 Railroad; 35°35′31″N 105°12′49″W	Las Vegas	
81	Presbyterian Mission Church	Presbyterian Mission Church	November 17, 1978 (#78001825)	1413 Chavez St. 35°35′22″N 105°13′34″W	Las Vegas	
82	Railroad Avenue Historic District	Railroad Avenue Historic District	August 6, 1979 (#79001551)	U.S. Route 85; 35°35′38″N 105°12′45″W	Las Vegas	
83	Rogers Administration Building	Rogers Administration Building	September 22, 1988 (#88001559)	National Ave., on the New Mexico Highlands University campus 35°35′43″N 105°13′10″W	Las Vegas	
84	Rowe Pueblo		May 26, 2000 (#00000547)	Address Restricted	Rowe	
85	St. Anthony's Hospital Annex		September 26, 1985 (#85002592)	700 Friedman; 35°36′10″N 105°13′19″W	Las Vegas	
86	St. Paul's Memorial Episcopal Church and Guild Hall	St. Paul's Memorial Episcopal Church and Guild Hall	November 7, 1976 (#76001198)	714-716 National Ave. 35°35′46″N 105°13′04″W	Las Vegas	
87	Vidal and Elisa Salazar House		September 26, 1985 (#85002637)	824 Railroad; 35°35′55″N 105°12′39″W	Las Vegas	
88	San Antonio de Padua Church	San Antonio de Padua Church	September 13, 1978 (#78001826)	State Road 63; 35°34′59″N 105°40′31″W	Pecos	
89	San Geronimo Historic District		November 15, 1983 (#83004163)	Off State Road 283; 35°34′47″N 105°23′44″W	San Geronimo	
90	San Miguel del Vado Historic District	San Miguel del Vado Historic District	July 17, 1972 (#72000809)	Southeast of San Jose on State Road 3, off U.S. Route 84; 35°21′47″N 105°27′01″W	San Jose	
91	Santa Fe Trail-San Miguel County Trail Segments		April 21, 1994 (#94000326)	West of Interstate 25, south of Tecolote; 35°27′08″N 105°16′49″W	Tecolote	
92	Santa Fe Trail-West San Jose Segment		August 8, 2014 (#14000481)	Address restricted	San Jose	
93	Schmitt-Laemmle House	Schmitt-Laemmle House	September 26, 1985 (#85002639)	1106 Columbia; 35°35′45″N 105°13′21″W	Las Vegas	House no longer there; site occupied by parking lot
94	Serna-Blanchard House		September 26, 1985 (#85002614)	2203 N. Gonzales; 35°35′46″N 105°13′41″W	Las Vegas	
95	Shawn-Guerin House		September 26, 1985 (#85002615)	140 Delgado; 35°35′47″N 105°13′39″W	Las Vegas	
96	M. M. Sundt House	M. M. Sundt House	September 26, 1985 (#85002638)	1607 8th 35°36′22″N 105°13′32″W	Las Vegas	
97	Taichert Building	Taichert Building	September 26, 1985 (#85002616)	1201 National; 35°35′37″N 105°13′20″W	Las Vegas	
98	Taichert Warehouse	Taichert Warehouse	September 26, 1985 (#85002618)	623 12th 35°35′35″N 105°13′19″W	Las Vegas	
99	Tipton-Black Willow Ranch Historic District		June 29, 2001 (#00001287)	3 miles east of Watrous; 35°47′28″N 104°55′34″W	Watrous	Extends into Mora County, New Mexico, too.
100	Truder Park		September 26, 1985 (#85002661)	Roughly bounded by 2nd, Washington, and Grand; 35°36′03″N 105°12′43″W	Las Vegas	
101	Trujillo-Gonzales House		September 26, 1985 (#85002617)	935 New Mexico; 35°35′10″N 105°13′36″W	Las Vegas	
102	Valencia Ranch Historic Archaeological District		February 9, 1984 (#84002975)	Address Restricted	Pecos	
103	Variadero Bridge	Variadero Bridge	July 22, 1997 (#97000736)	State Road 104 over Rio Conchas; 35°23′21″N 104°27′33″W	Variadero	
104	C. W. G. Ward House	C. W. G. Ward House	September 26, 1985 (#85002593)	1301 8th 35°36′09″N 105°13′23″W	Las Vegas	

== Former listings ==
	Name on the Register	Image	Date listed	Date removed	Location	City or town	Description
1	Elks Lodge Building		February 28, 1985 (#85000377)	June 10, 1998	819 Douglas Avenue	Las Vegas	Destroyed by fire on November 12, 1997.
2	Las Vegas Armory	Las Vegas Armory	October 28, 1983 (#83004160)	March 16, 1994	917 Douglas Avenue; 35°36′08″N 105°13′26″W	Las Vegas	Most of the building was destroyed in a fire in 1993 but the front section is still standing.
3	Las Vegas Iron Works		September 26, 1985 (#85002636)	July 3, 1996	Off NM 65/104	Las Vegas	

== See also ==
- List of National Historic Landmarks in New Mexico
- National Register of Historic Places listings in New Mexico
