= Our Lady of Sorrows Church =

Our Lady of Sorrows Church or Our Lady of Dolours Church or Church of Our Lady of Sorrows or Church of Our Lady of Dolours, or similar names may refer to:

== Brazil ==
- Minor Basilica of Our Lady of Sorrows, Porto Alegre

== Canada ==
- Our Lady of Sorrows Roman Catholic Church, Kingsway, Etobicoke, Ontario

== Chile ==
- Church of Our Lady of Sorrows, Dalcahue, Chiloé Island

== Germany ==
- Mater Dolorosa (Berlin-Lankwitz)

== India ==
- Our Lady of Sorrows Church, Kasargode, Kerala
- St. Mary's Cathedral, Madurai Tamil Nadu, also known as Church of Our Lady of Dolours
- Basilica of Our Lady of Dolours, Thrissur, Kerala

== Latvia ==
- Our Lady of Sorrows Church, Riga

== Malaysia ==
- Church of Our Lady of Sorrows in City Parish, George Town, Penang

== Malta ==
- Our Lady of Sorrows Chapel, Mqabba

== Pakistan ==
- Our Lady of Sorrows Church, Kasur

== Portugal ==
- Church of Our Lady of Sorrows, Póvoa de Varzim

== Slovakia ==
- Our Lady of Sorrows Church, Poprad

== Sri Lanka ==
- Our Lady of Sorrows Church, Kandawala, Negombo

== United Kingdom ==
=== England ===
- Our Lady of Sorrows Church, Bognor Regis, West Sussex
- Our Lady of Sorrows Church, Bamford, Derbyshire
- Our Lady of Dolours, Chelsea, London

=== Wales ===
- Our Lady of Sorrows Church, Dolgellau

=== Gibraltar ===
- Our Lady of Sorrows Church, Gibraltar

== United States ==
- Our Lady of Sorrows Church (Santa Barbara, California)
- Our Lady of Sorrows Catholic Church in Wahiawa, Hawaii
- Our Lady of Sorrows Basilica, Chicago, Illinois
- Shrine of Our Lady of Sorrows, Starkenberg, Missouri
- Our Lady of Sorrows Roman Catholic Church (South Orange, New Jersey)
- Our Lady of Sorrows Church (Bernalillo, New Mexico), listed on the National Register of Historic Places
- Our Lady of Sorrows Church (Las Vegas, New Mexico), listed on the National Register of Historic Places
- Church of Our Lady of Sorrows (New York City)
- Our Lady of Sorrows Chapel, La Crosse, Wisconsin
- Our Lady of Sorrows Catholic Church (Rock Springs, Wyoming), listed on the National Register of Historic Places

== Uruguay ==
- Nuestra Señora de los Dolores (Tierra Santa), Montevideo

== See also ==
- Our Lady of Sorrows#Patronage
- St. Mary of Sorrows (Fairfax, Virginia)
