= Sixth Street Historic District =

Sixth Street Historic District may refer to:

in the United States

(by state)

- Sixth Street Historic District (Grandin, Missouri)
- Sixth Street Historic District (Portsmouth, Ohio), listed on the NRHP in Ohio
- Sixth Street Historic District (Austin, Texas)
- Sixth Street Historic District (Hudson, Wisconsin), listed on the NRHP in Wisconsin
- Douglas-Sixth Street Historic District
- Historic Sixth Street Business District
- South Sixth Street Historic District
- U.S. Route 66-Sixth Street Historic District, Amarillo, TX, listed on the NRHP in Texas
- West Fifth Street-West Sixth Street Historic District
- West Sixth Street and Mayes Place Historic District, Columbia, TN, listed on the NRHP in Tennessee
- West Sixth Street Historic District
