= Eugenio Gatignole House =

- U.S. National Register of Historic Places
- Location within New Mexico
- Location: 1114 S. Gonzales, Las Vegas, New Mexico
- Coordinates: 35°35′18″N 105°13′24″W
- Area: less than one acre
- Built: before 1902
- Architectural style: New Mexico Vernacular
- MPS: Las Vegas New Mexico MRA
- NRHP reference No.: 85002606
- Added to NRHP: September 26, 1985

The Eugenio Gatignole House, at 1114 S. Gonzales in Las Vegas, New Mexico, was listed on the National Register of Historic Places in 1985.

It has stuccoed adobe walls, a concrete coping at its base, a corrugated metal roof, and was built before 1902. The porch of the house is immediately adjacent to the Acequia Madre, an important irrigation ditch that also is National Register-listed, on the house's west side. It is approached from the street by a folk wooden gateway and a footbridge over the acequia. Steps then descend 5 feet (1.5 m) to the level of the house. This approach is an important part of the historic setting.

It is New Mexico Vernacular in style. It was deemed significant as "a fine example of the Hybrid phase of the New Mexico Vernacular which combined the Hispanic building tradition with Anglo-American introductions. The adobe construction and single file plan with the implied linear internal circulation pattern come from the basic tradition; the pitched roof, orientation toward the street and the window/door/window symmetry are the more recent innovations. This combination appears to represent two or more stages of construction: first, a flat roofed building of three rooms (each with its own door?); second, between 1913 and 1921, the addition of the porches, pitched roof and, probably, the casement windows; third, the addition of a fourth room at the far north end. The typical gable door opens to a food drying attic. French born blacksmith Eugenio Gatignole was an early and longtime resident."

It is located just southeast of the southern end of the Distrito de las Escuelas.
