= St. Paul's Memorial Episcopal Church and Guild Hall =

Historic church in New Mexico, United States

- U.S. National Register of Historic Places
- NM State Register of Cultural Properties
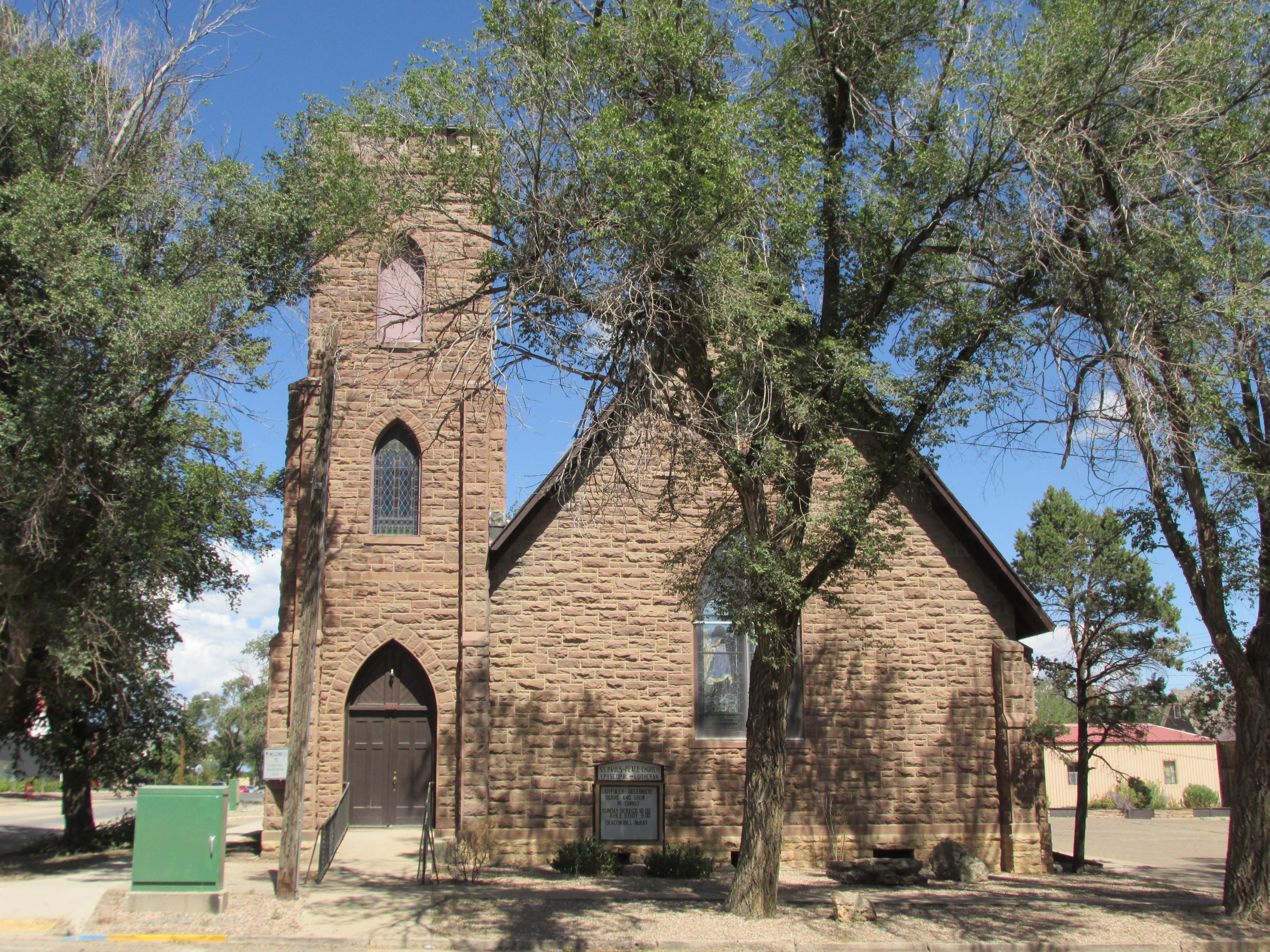
- St. Paul's Memorial Episcopal Church

- Location within New Mexico Location within the United States
- Location: 714—716 National Ave., Las Vegas, New Mexico
- Coordinates: 35°35′46″N 105°13′4″W
- Area: 0.8 acres (0.32 ha)
- Built: 1886
- Architectural style: Territorial
- NRHP reference No.: 76001198
- NMSRCP No.: 338

Significant dates
- Added to NRHP: November 7, 1976
- Designated NMSRCP: July 26, 1974

St. Paul's Memorial Episcopal Church and Guild Hall is a historic church at 714–716 National Avenue in Las Vegas, New Mexico. Construction took place from 1886 to 1888, and it was added to the National Register of Historic Places in 1976.

Though the church structure was constructed in the late-1880s, it was not completed until 1950. The 1950 work, completing a sanctuary and chancel, was designed by architect John Gaw Meem. It is built of local red sandstone.

== See also ==
- National Register of Historic Places listings in San Miguel County, New Mexico
