= Presbyterian Mission Church =

Historic church in New Mexico, United States

- U.S. National Register of Historic Places
- NM State Register of Cultural Properties
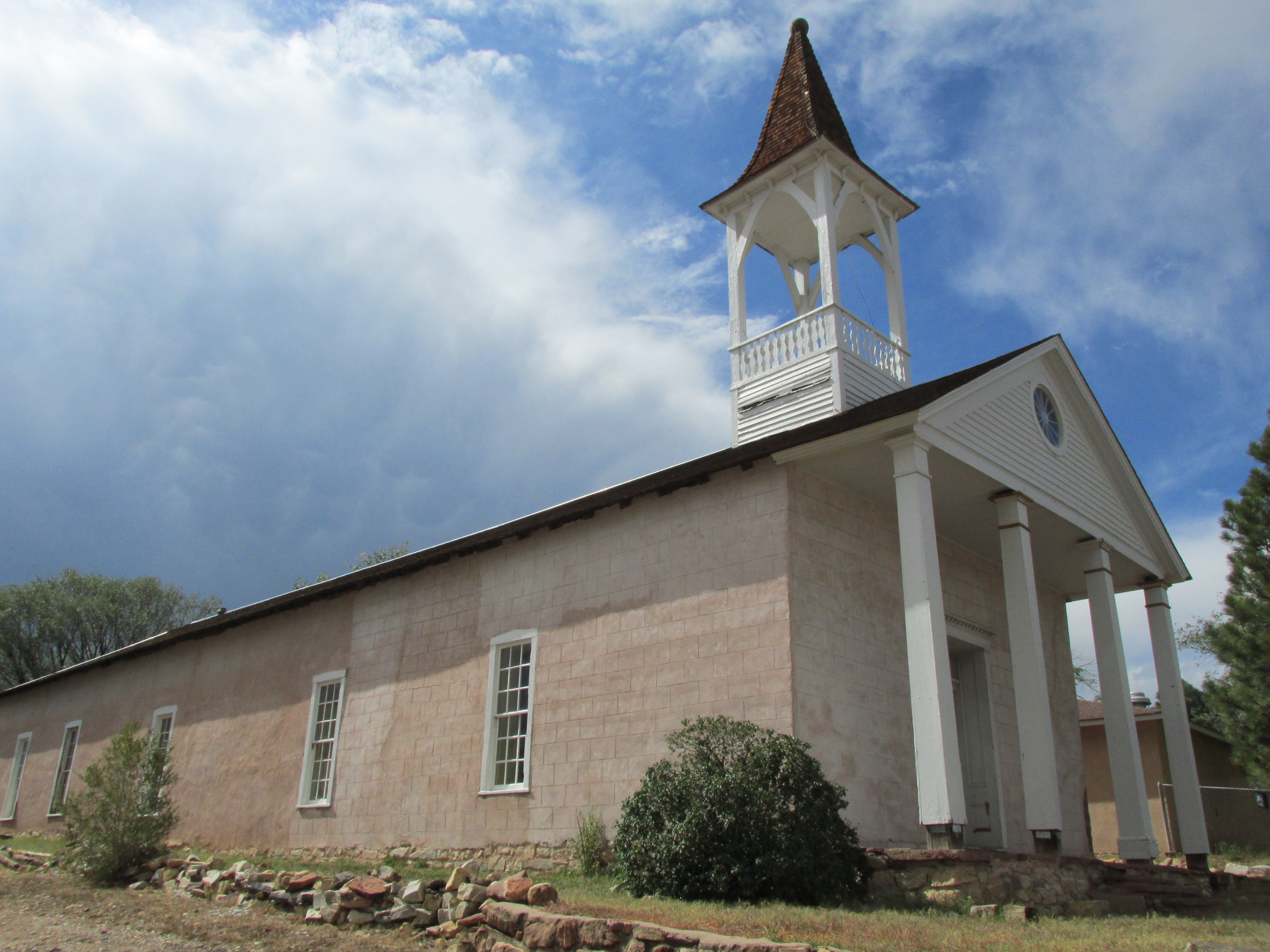
- Presbyterian Mission Church

- Location within New Mexico Location within the United States
- Location: 1413 Chavez St., Las Vegas, New Mexico
- Coordinates: 35°35′22″N 105°13′34″W
- Area: 0.2 acres (0.081 ha)
- Built: 1871-73
- Built by: David H. Powell
- NRHP reference No.: 78001825
- NMSRCP No.: 296

Significant dates
- Added to NRHP: November 17, 1978
- Designated NMSRCP: August 24, 1973

The Presbyterian Mission Church in Las Vegas, New Mexico is a historic church at 1413 Chavez Street. It was built during 1871-73 and was added to the National Register of Historic Places in 1978.

It is located three blocks south of the historic Las Vegas plaza. It is a 100 by 25 feet (30.5 m × 7.6 m) adobe brick building covered with adobe plaster.

== See also ==
- National Register of Historic Places listings in San Miguel County, New Mexico
