= First Baptist Church (Las Vegas, New Mexico) =

Historic church in New Mexico, United States

- U.S. National Register of Historic Places
- NM State Register of Cultural Properties
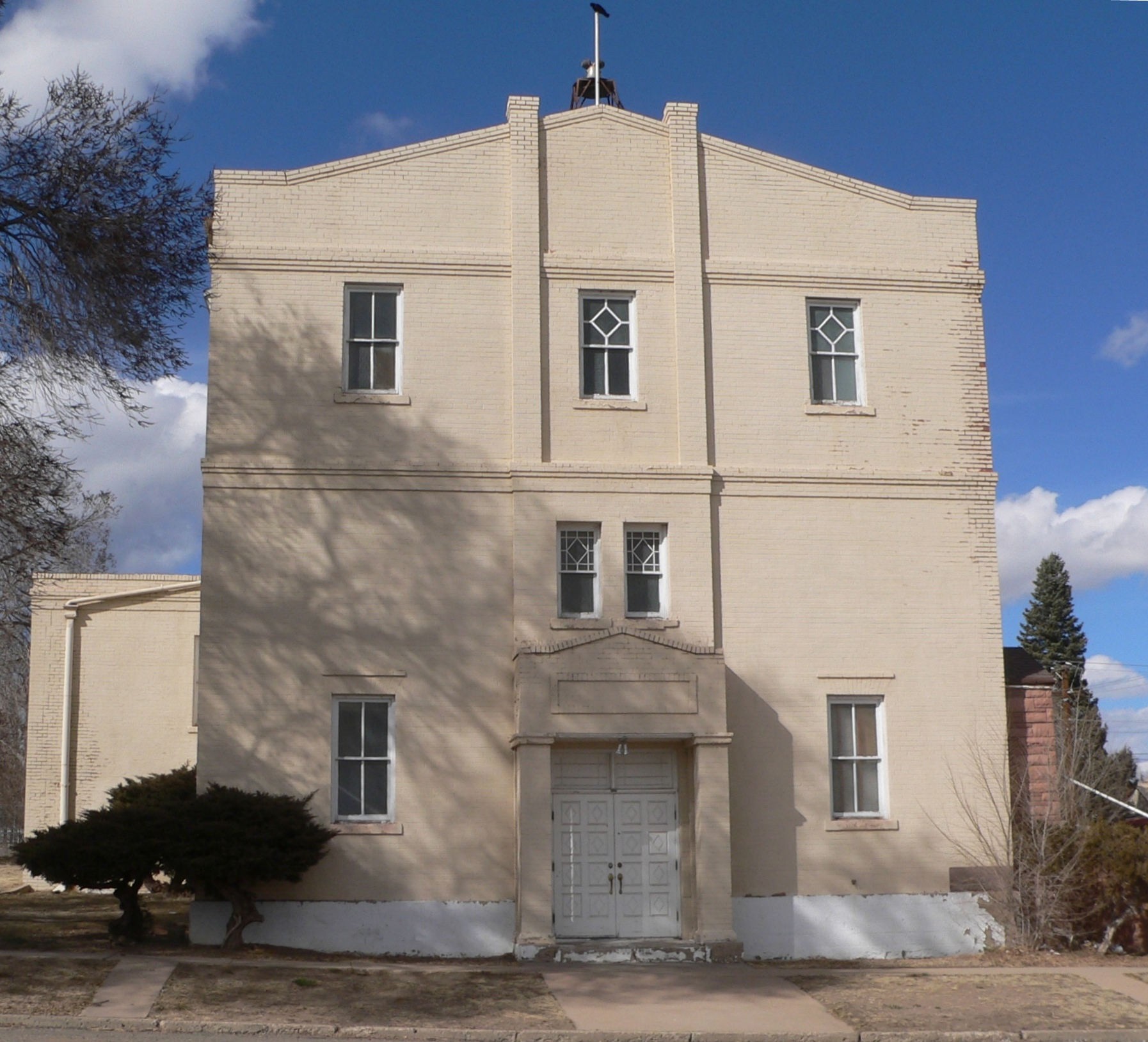

- Location within New Mexico Location within the United States
- Location: 700 University Ave., Las Vegas, New Mexico
- Coordinates: 35°35′47″N 105°13′2″W
- Area: less than one acre
- Built: 1922
- Architect: O.M. Sperry
- MPS: Las Vegas New Mexico MRA
- NRHP reference No.: 85002612
- NMSRCP No.: 1052

Significant dates
- Added to NRHP: September 26, 1985
- Designated NMSRCP: August 17, 1984

The First Baptist Church in Las Vegas, New Mexico is a historic Baptist church at 700 University Avenue. It was built in 1922 and added to the National Register of Historic Places in 1985.

It is a three-story utilitarian building. It served the Baptist congregation in Las Vegas which was organized in 1880 and had its first church building by 1885.

== See also ==
- National Register of Historic Places listings in San Miguel County, New Mexico
