= Building at 1406 Romero =

- U.S. National Register of Historic Places
- Location within New Mexico
- Location: 1406 Romero, Las Vegas, New Mexico
- Coordinates: 35°35′15″N 105°13′51″W
- Area: less than one acre
- Built: c.1895
- Architectural style: New Mexico Vernacular
- MPS: Las Vegas New Mexico MRA
- NRHP reference No.: 85002656
- Added to NRHP: September 26, 1985

The Building at 1406 Romero in Las Vegas, New Mexico was listed on the National Register of Historic Places in 1985.

It has stuccoed adobe walls built upon a stuccoed foundation, and an L-shaped plan. It has a food drying attic above what may be an original flat earthen roof.

It was deemed significant as an "unaltered, classic example of the New Mexico Vernacular type of about 1895.
