= Shawn-Guerin House =

- U.S. National Register of Historic Places
- Location within New Mexico
- Location: 140 Delgado, Las Vegas, New Mexico
- Coordinates: 35°35′47″N 105°13′39″W
- Area: less than one acre
- Architectural style: Bungalow/craftsman
- MPS: Las Vegas New Mexico MRA
- NRHP reference No.: 85002615
- Added to NRHP: September 26, 1985

The Shawn-Guerin House, at 140 Delgado in Las Vegas, New Mexico, was listed on the National Register of Historic Places in 1985.

Its NRHP nomination states: "Like the Angel House on South Pacific (ill. 18), the Shawn-Guerin House represents a local builder's novel adaptation of contemporary architectural features. Stone is used where brick was in the Colonial Revival and Bungalow Style houses on the other side of the river. The building's massing and wide eaves recall the Bungalow Style, while the classical columns of the porch and the symmetrical window/door/window beneath reflect turn of the century classicism."
