= James Cook House =

- U.S. National Register of Historic Places
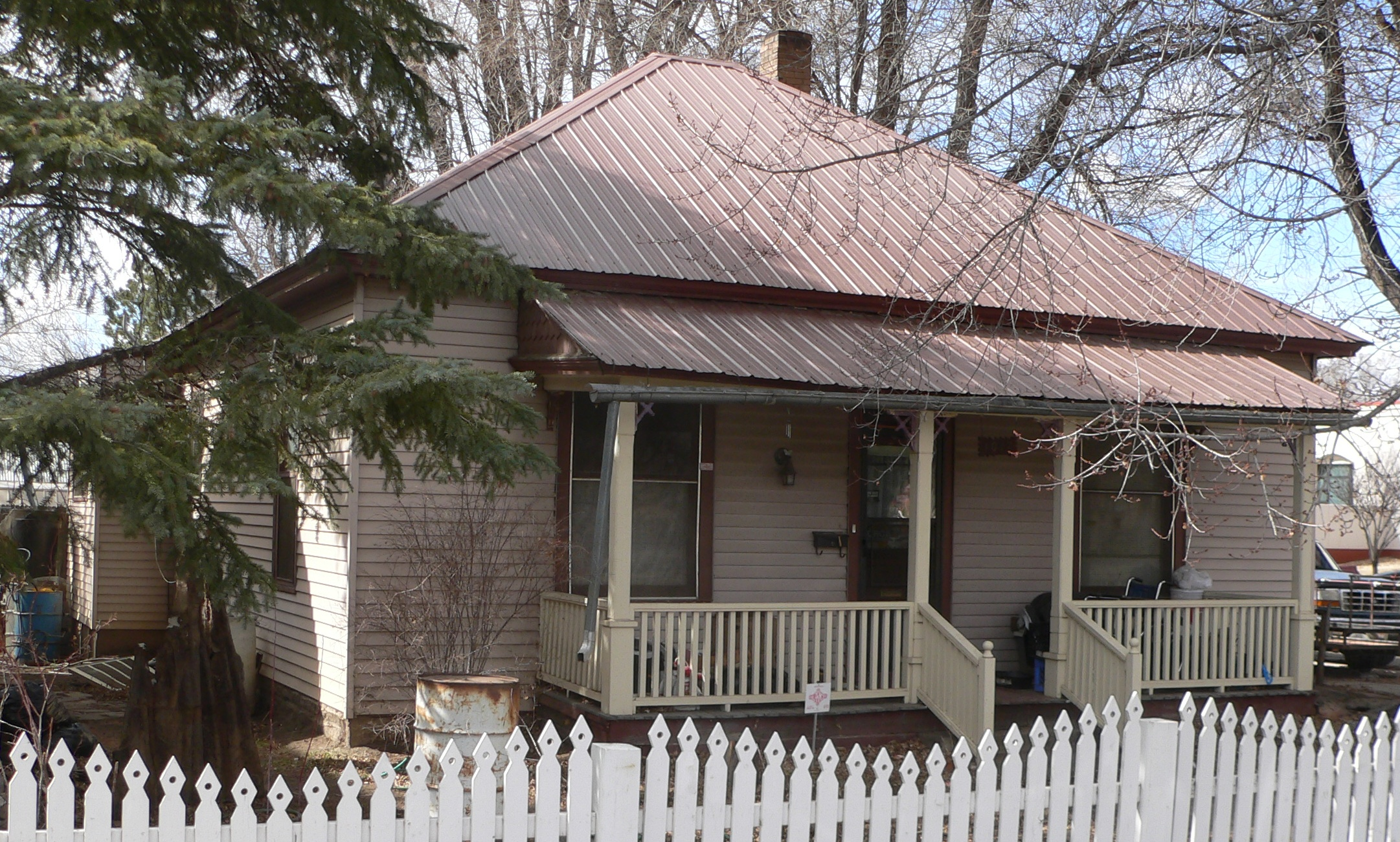

- Location within New Mexico
- Location: 1017 11th, Las Vegas, New Mexico
- Coordinates: 35°35′49″N 105°13′23″W
- Area: less than one acre
- Architectural style: New Mexico vernacular
- MPS: Las Vegas New Mexico MRA
- NRHP reference No.: 85002647
- Added to NRHP: September 26, 1985

The James Cook House, at 1017 11th in Las Vegas, New Mexico, was listed on the National Register of Historic Places in 1985.

It is a "Hipped Box" style house, which may be termed New Mexico vernacular in style.
