= Acequia Madre (Las Vegas, New Mexico) =

- U.S. National Register of Historic Places
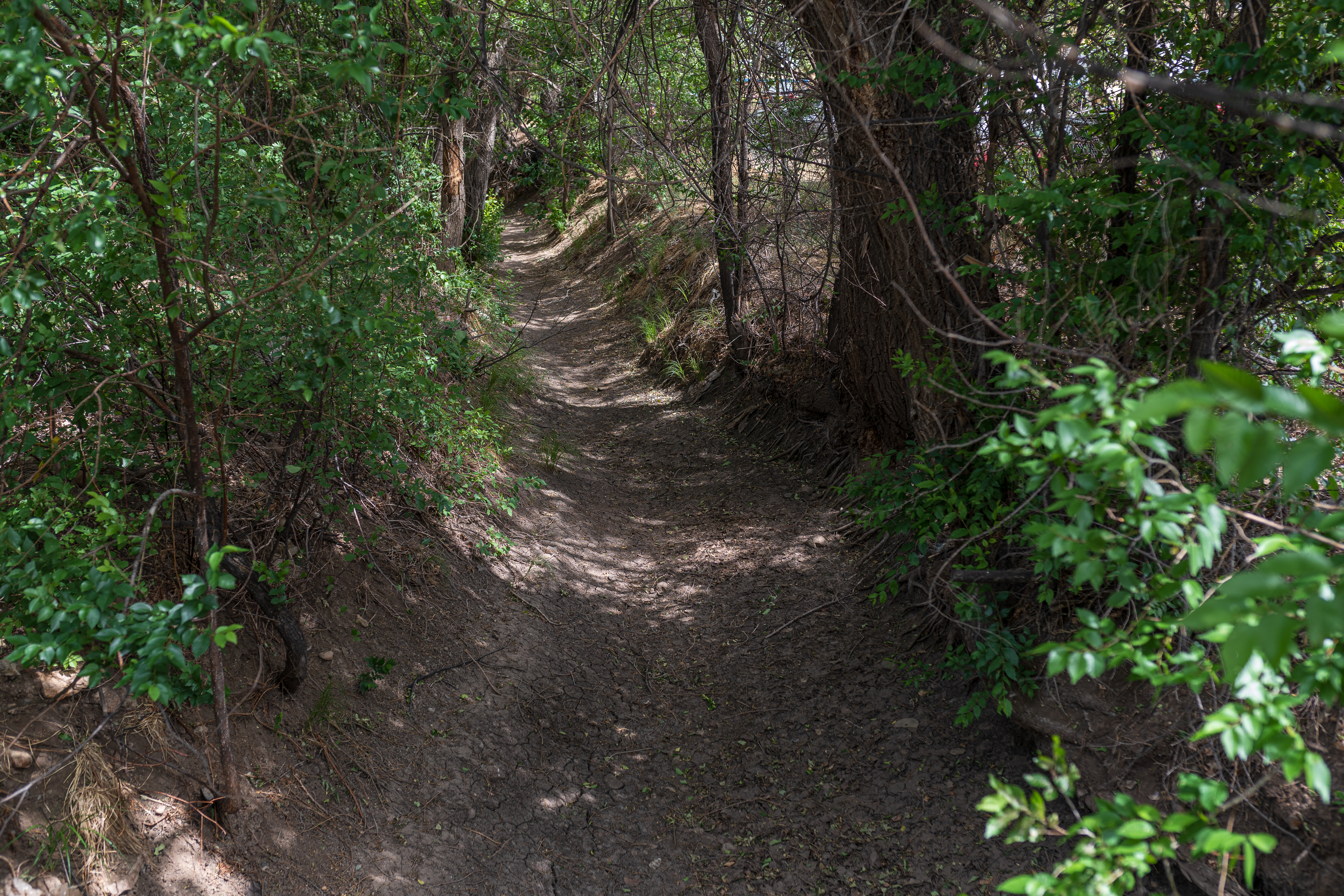
- Acequia Madre at Valencia St. in Las Vegas on 19 June 2022

- Location within New Mexico
- Location: Roughly from Gallinas River to intersection of S. Pacific and U.S. Route 85, Las Vegas, New Mexico
- Coordinates: 35°35′05″N 105°13′26″W
- Area: 3.6 acres (1.5 ha)
- Built: c.1835-36
- MPS: Las Vegas New Mexico MRA
- NRHP reference No.: 87001118
- Added to NRHP: March 19, 1987

The Acequia Madre, in Las Vegas, New Mexico, is a historic acequia which was built at the time of Las Vegas' settlement in 1835–36. It was listed on the National Register of Historic Places in 1987.

It runs from the Gallinas River to the approximate intersection of S. Pacific and U.S. Route 85 in Las Vegas.

"Description: An earthen irrigation channel; 3-5 feet wide; and 2-3 feet deep. Leaving the Gallinas River at a point due northeast of Taos Street; proceeding southwest through unplatted land to the northeast corner of Block 3 of the Baca and Sandoval Addition; proceeding south along the east boundary of Blocks 3-4 of the Baca and Sandoval Addition and Blocks E and F of the Original Town; proceeding through, then along the west edge of, then through Block L of the Original Town; proceeding south along the east boundary of blocks 50-53 of the Addition to the Town of Las Vegas; proceeding south through unplatted land, dissipating beyond the intersection of S. Pacific and U.S. 85."

"Significance; Work on the Acequia Madre, or main irrigation ditch, undoubtly started the first or second year of settlement (1835-36), such was its importance to a traditional Hispanic farming village. An east side ditch and another on the west side, La Acequia Nuestra Senora de Los Dolores, were constructed later, but both disappeared by the mid-1920s. The Acequia Madre appears as a property boundary in deeds from the 1850s; were it served this secondary function, its location has probably not changed."

"The system starts with a rubble stone diversion dam on the Gallinas River due east of Taos Street. The earthen ditch itself, from three to five feet wide and two to three feet deep, wends its way south parallel to the river. In some communities, the ditch association, with its elected leader or mayordomo served as a quasi-governmental institution which sometimes became a focal point for resistance to Anglo-American control. In West Las Vegas, where the Spanish-speaking population retained a large measure of political control, the ditch association has remained a secondary institution. That the association and the ditch still operate, bringing water to fields along the river, represents a still vital aspect of the original Hispanic village."

The National Register listing is defined narrowly to include just the waterway and its embankments.

The Eugenio Gatignole House is one historic house directly adjacent to the acequia (and its National Register photo also shows the acequia).
