= E. N. Charles and Lewis Arthur House =

- Arthur, Charles and Lewis, E. N. House
- U.S. National Register of Historic Places
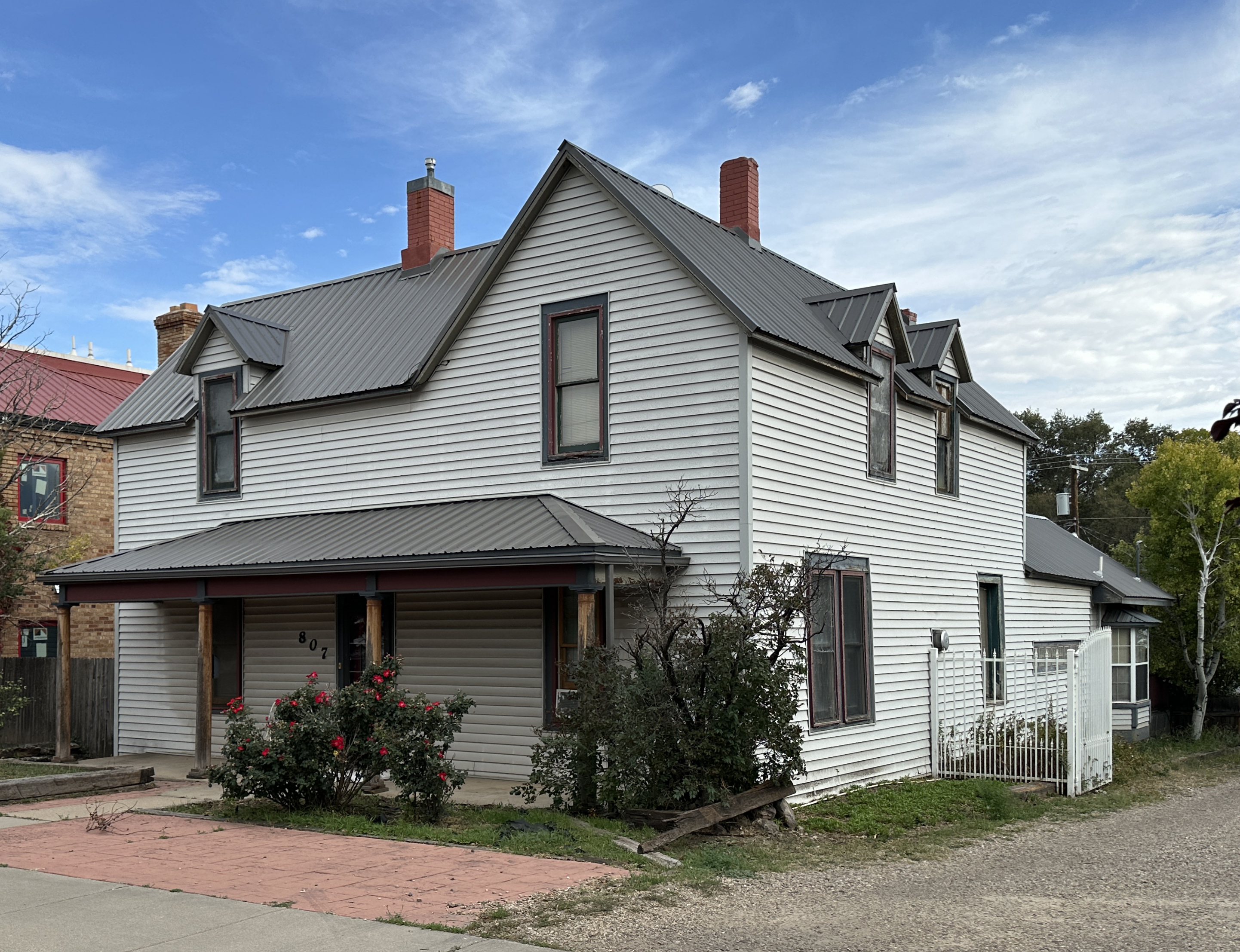

- Location within New Mexico
- Location: Douglas Ave., Las Vegas, New Mexico
- Coordinates: 35°35′37″N 105°13′02″W
- Area: less than one acre
- Built: c.1895
- Architectural style: World's Fair Classic
- MPS: Las Vegas New Mexico MRA
- NRHP reference No.: 85002605
- Added to NRHP: September 26, 1985

The E.N. Charles and Lewis Arthur House, on Douglas Ave. in Las Vegas, New Mexico, was built in 1893. It was listed on the National Register of Historic Places in 1985.

It is a wood-frame building built between 1892 and 1895. Its hipped roof porch with columns reflects "influence of the local World's Fair Classic Style which developed after 1898. It therefore was probably added after the original construction, possibly between 1908 and 1913 when the rear room was added.". It had become a boarding house within 15 years of its construction.
