= Building at 2005 Montezuma =

- U.S. National Register of Historic Places
- Location within New Mexico
- Location: 2005 Montezuma Ave., Las Vegas, New Mexico
- Coordinates: 35°35′31″N 105°13′57″W
- Area: less than one acre
- Architectural style: New Mexico Vernacular
- MPS: Las Vegas New Mexico MRA
- NRHP reference No.: 85002655
- Added to NRHP: September 26, 1985

The Building at 2005 Montezuma, at 2005 Montezuma Avenue in Las Vegas, New Mexico, was listed on the National Register of Historic Places in 1985.

It is or was an L-shaped building with transitional style between Anglo-American versus Hispanic influences within New Mexico Vernacular type. A feature "generally dates to the 1870s, sometimes to the 1880s."

The building may no longer exist.
