= House at 1116 Columbia =

- U.S. National Register of Historic Places
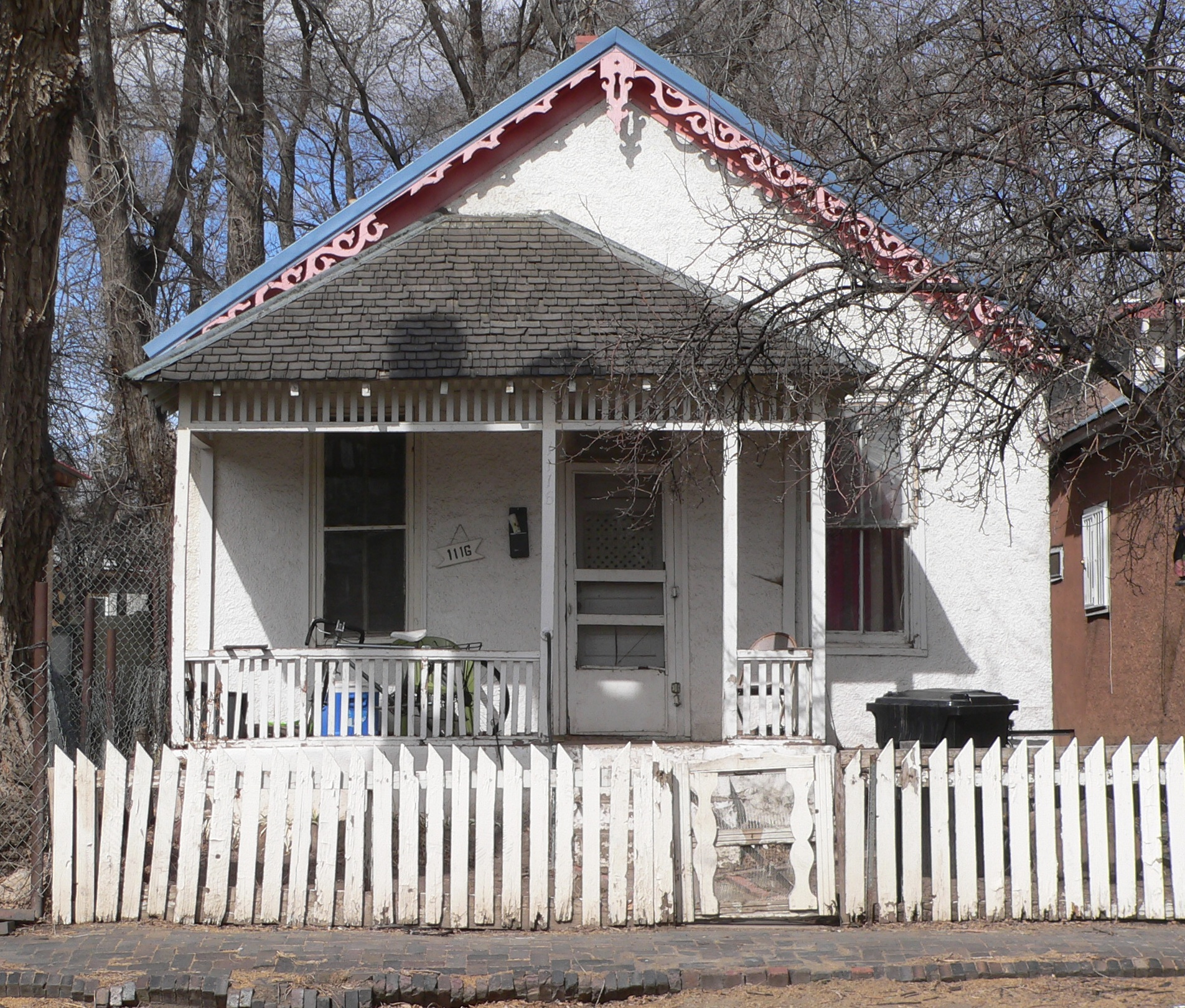

- Location within New Mexico
- Location: 1116 Columbia, Las Vegas, New Mexico
- Coordinates: 35°35′44″N 105°13′23″W
- Area: less than one acre
- Built: c.1880s or 1890s; c.1910
- Architectural style: Wood Vernacular
- MPS: Las Vegas New Mexico MRA
- NRHP reference No.: 85002641
- Added to NRHP: September 26, 1985

The House at 1116 Columbia, at 1116 Columbia Avenue in Las Vegas, New Mexico, was listed on the National Register of Historic Places in 1985.

It is a vernacular-style stuccoed wood-framed house upon a stuccoed foundation. It has a front-facing gable whose eaves include a cutout bargeboard and pendant. Based on the style it was probably built in the 1880s or early 1890s. It has an off-center porch with stick railing and frieze which was added c.1910.

It is in the easternpart of the Sulzbacher and Rosenwald Addition (see also "Building #1559" in State Survey series).
