= St. Mary's Cathedral, Madurai =

St. Mary's Cathedral Shrine, Madurai
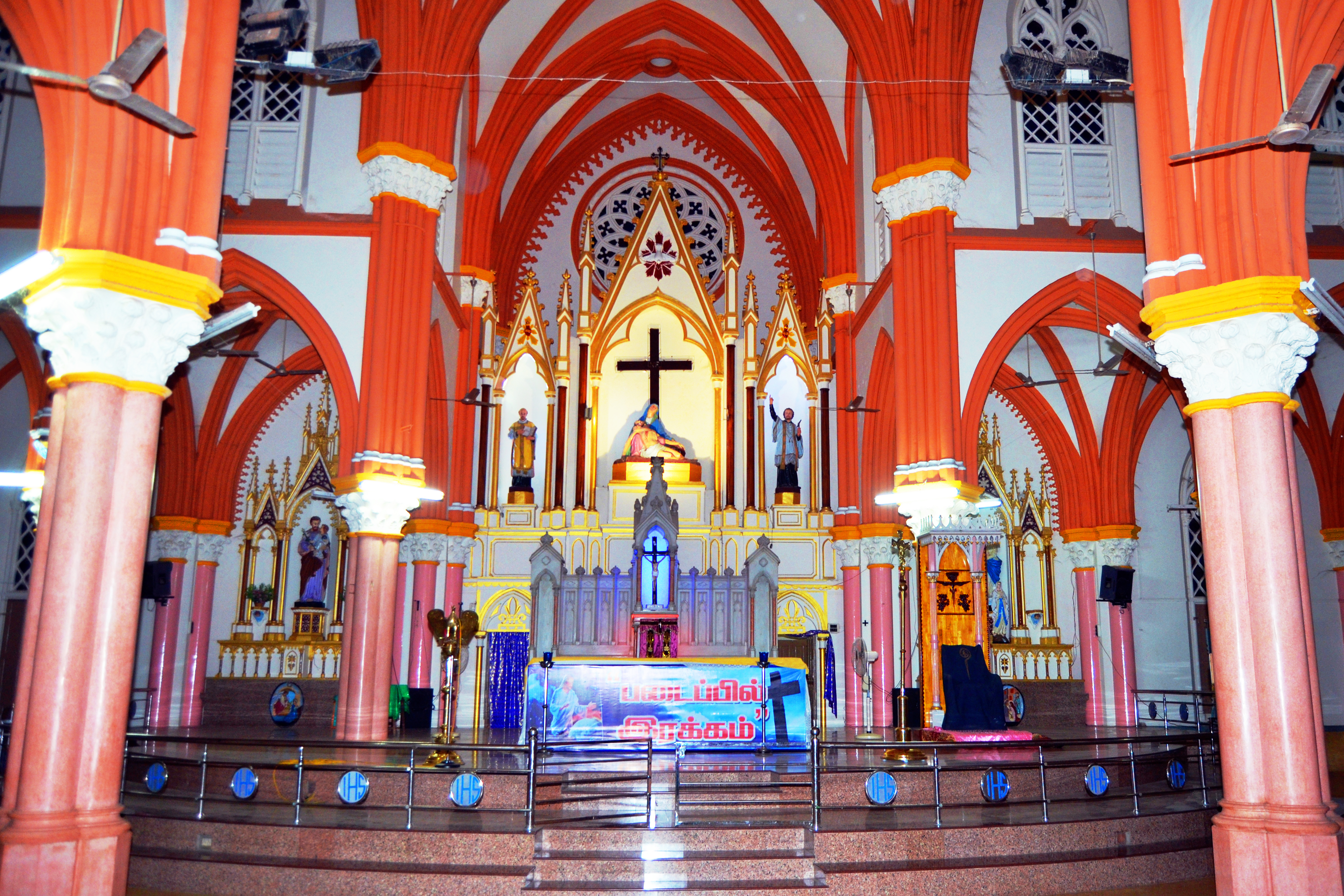
- St. Mary's Cathedral Shrine, Madurai

- St. Mary's Cathedral, Madurai, Tamil Nadu
- 9°54′48.3″N 78°07′32.7″E
- Location: East Veli Street, Madurai, Tamil Nadu
- Country: India
- Denomination: Catholic Church

History
- Status: Parish church

Architecture
- Functional status: Active
- Architect: Savarimuthu
- Architectural type: Chapel
- Style: European, Roman and Continental architectural design
- Groundbreaking: 1840
- Completed: 1841

Administration
- Archdiocese: Archdiocese of Madurai
- Parish: Madurai

St. Mary's Cathedral Shrine or Church of Our Lady of Dolours is a Roman Catholic church situated in Madurai, Tamil Nadu in India. This church attained the status of a Cathedral in the year 1969. It is built with two bell towers each 42 m high.

== Location ==
It is located with the geographic coordinates of (9°54′48.3″N 78°07′32.7″E) at an altitude of about 157.1 metres (515 ft) above the mean sea level, on East (Keela) Veli street, in Madurai city.

== Details ==
The church was founded in the year 1840 by Fr. Bertrend SJ and was built in the year 1841 by Fr. Garnier. This church is one of the popular churches in Tamil Nadu.

This church is constructed with a mixture of European, Roman and Continental architectural designs.

Occasions like Christmas, Easter, Good Friday and feast for the saints of Christianity are celebrated here in this church annually.

== Gallery ==
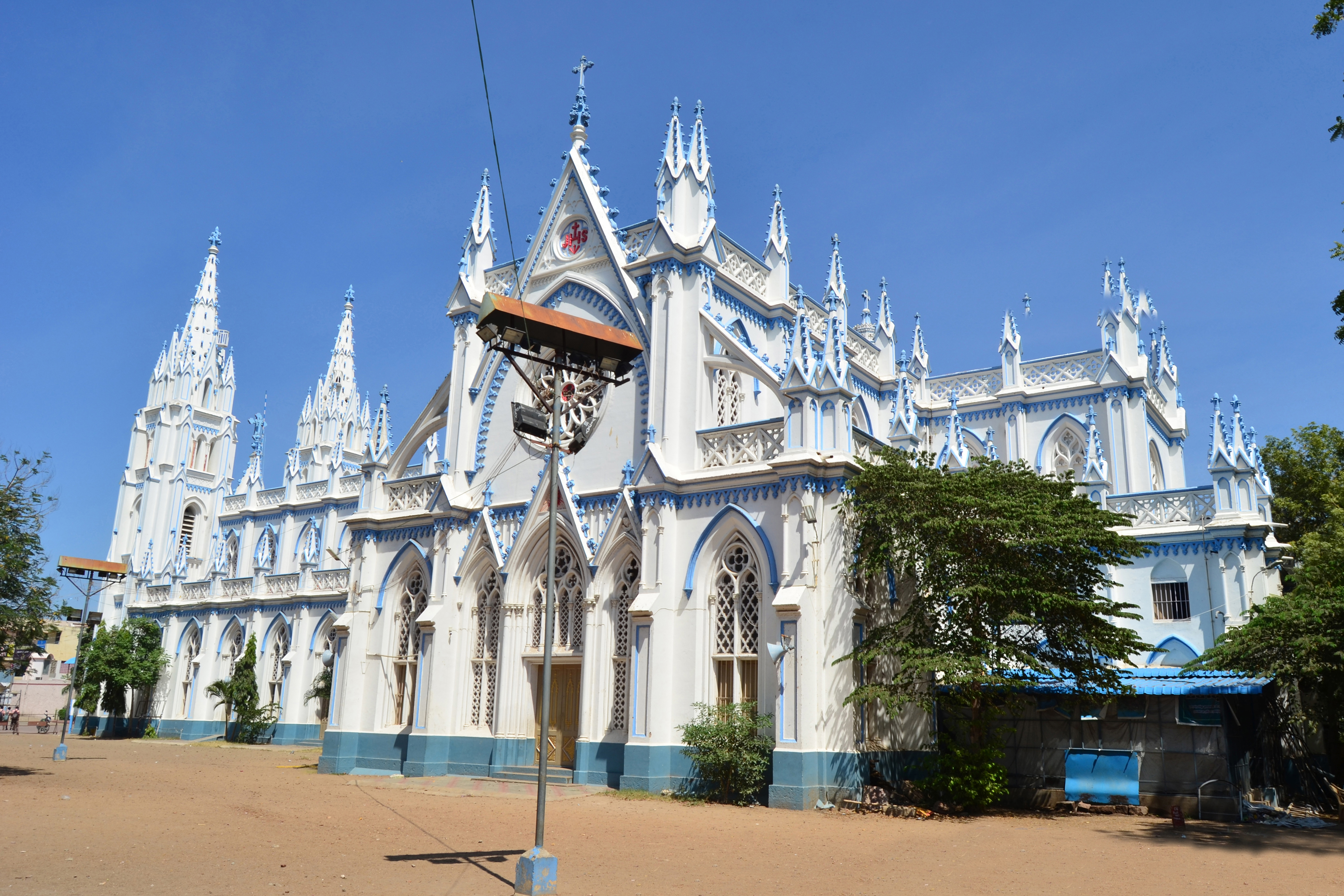
St. Mary's Cathedral side view, Madurai

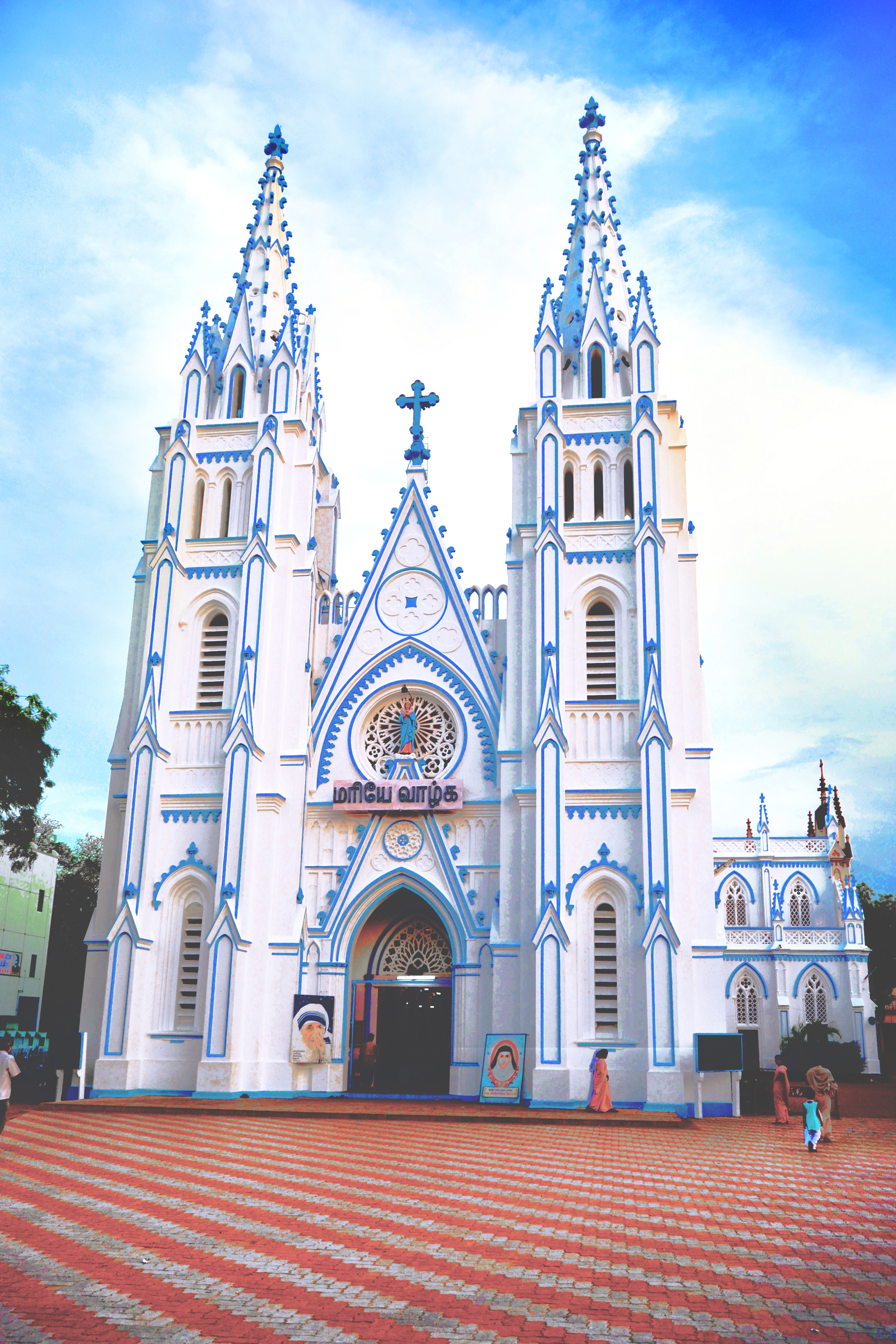
St. Mary's Cathedral front view, Madurai

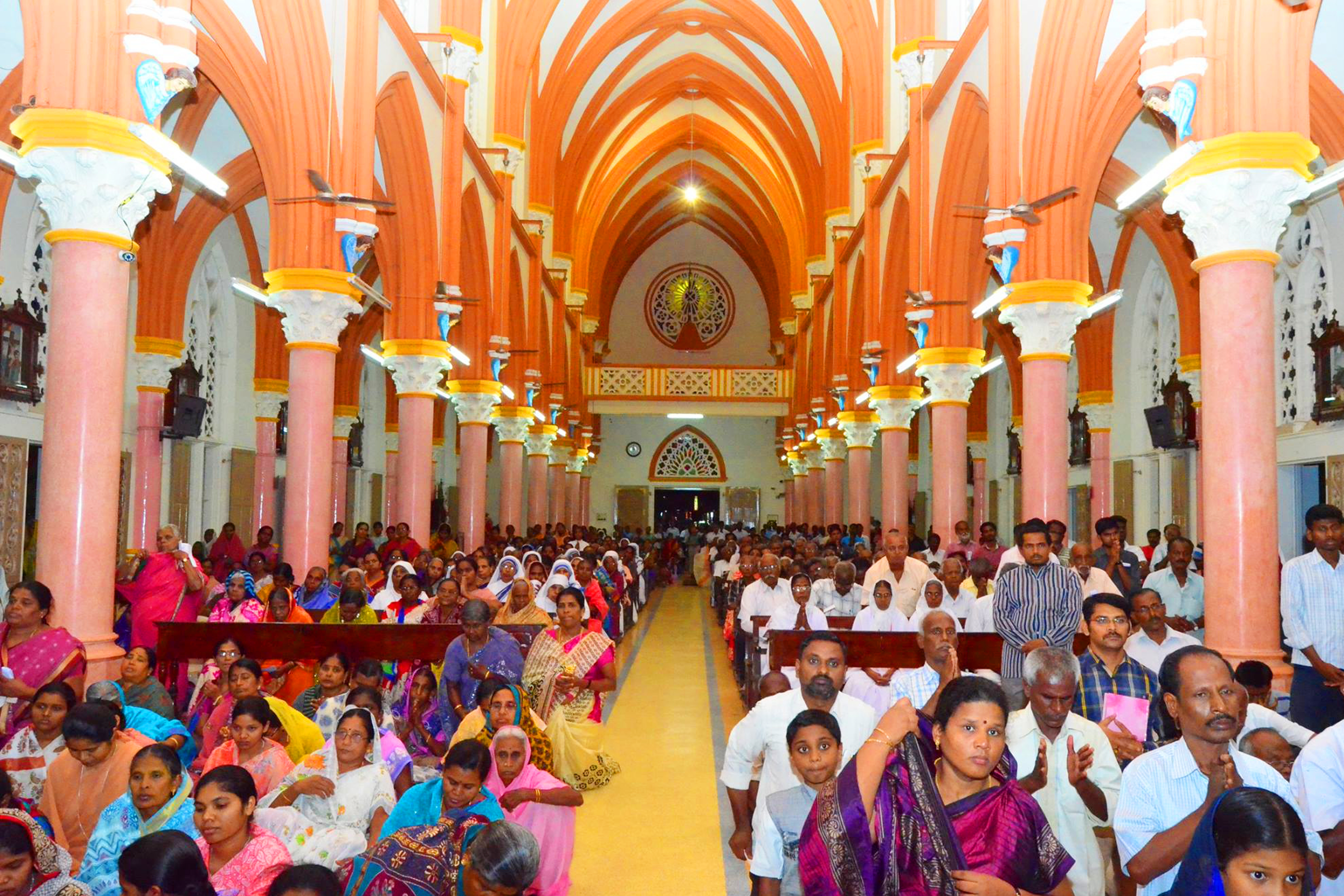
St. Mary's Cathedral inside view, Madurai

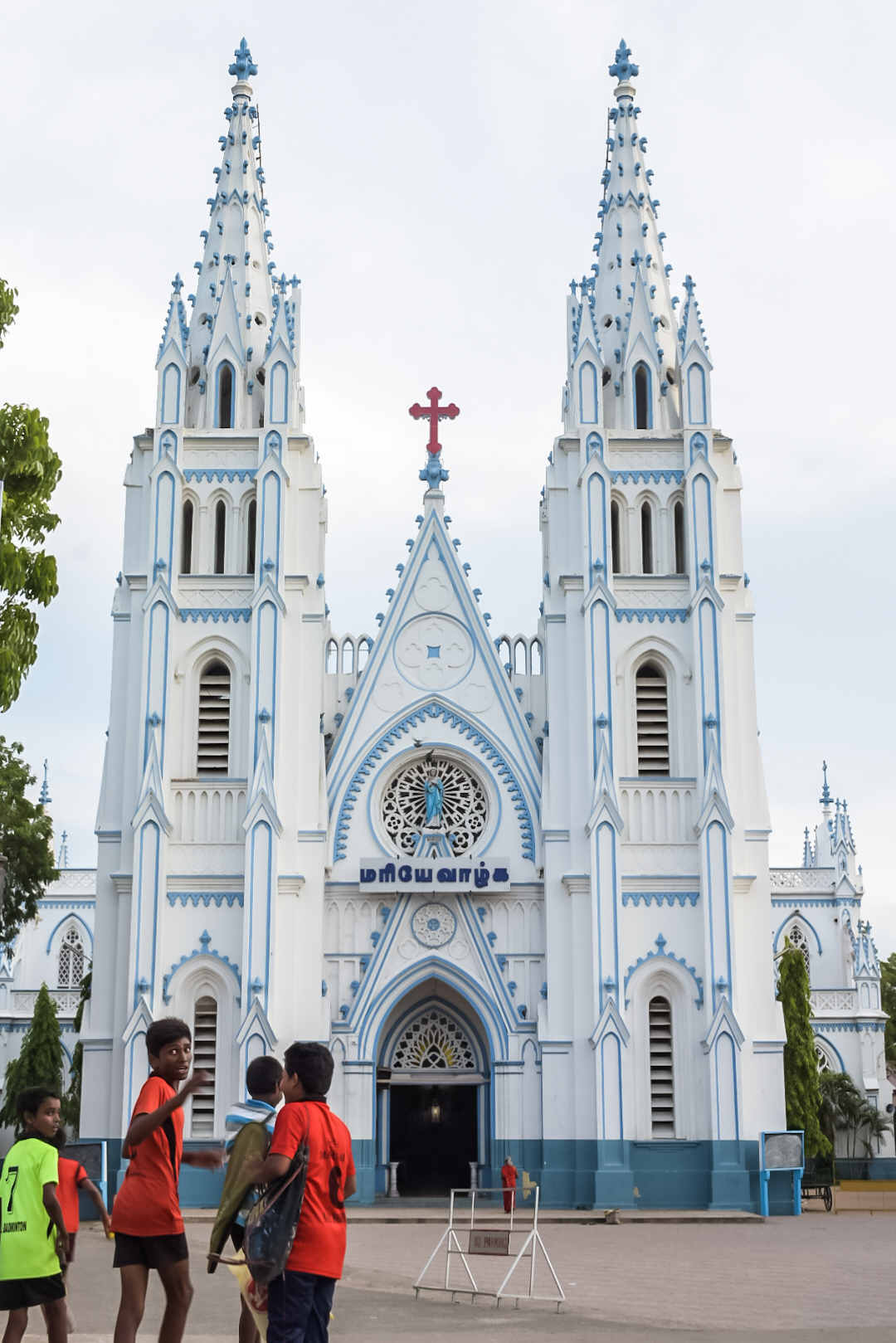
St. Mary's Church, Madurai

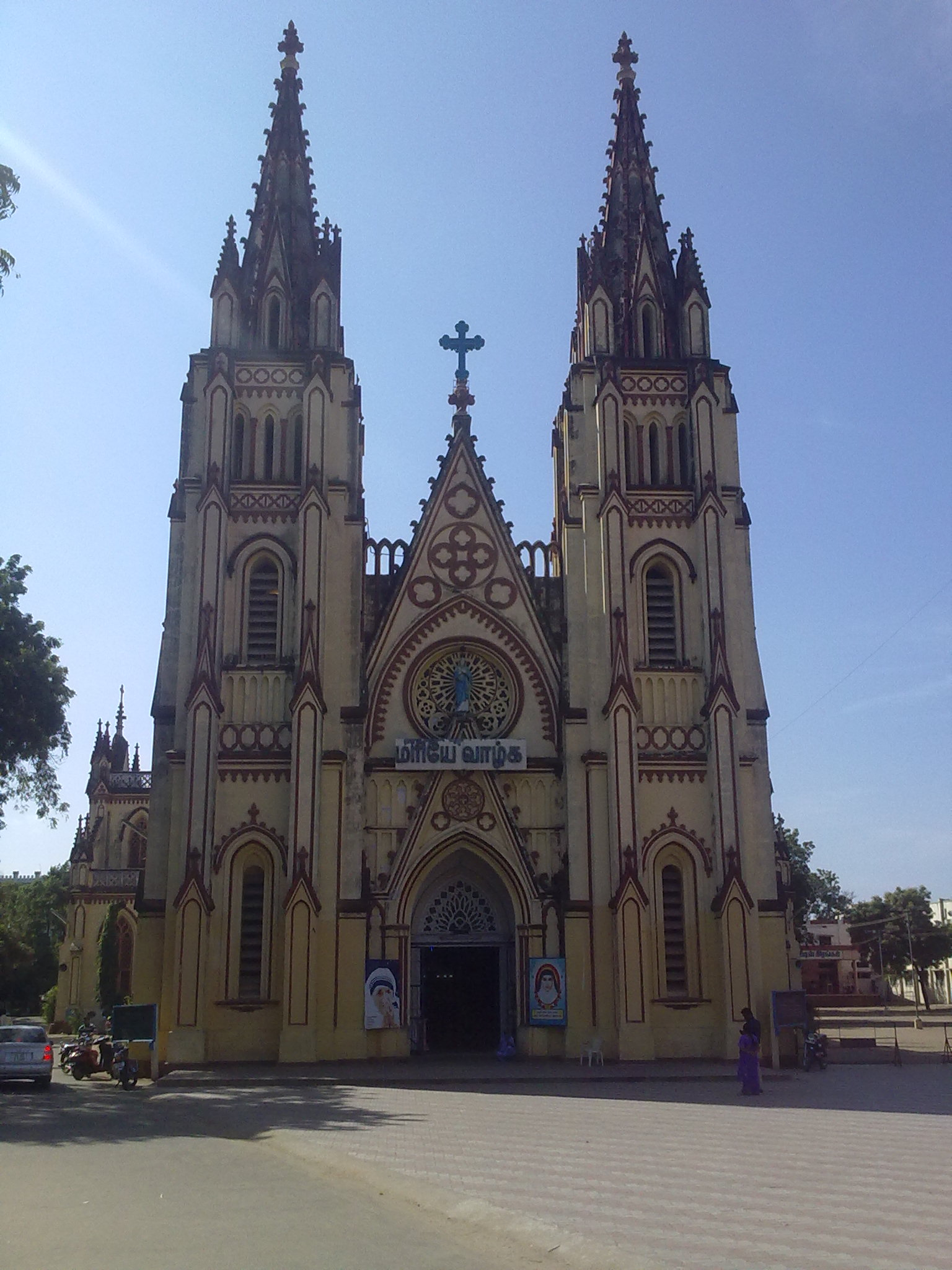
St. Mary's Church, East Veli street, Madurai

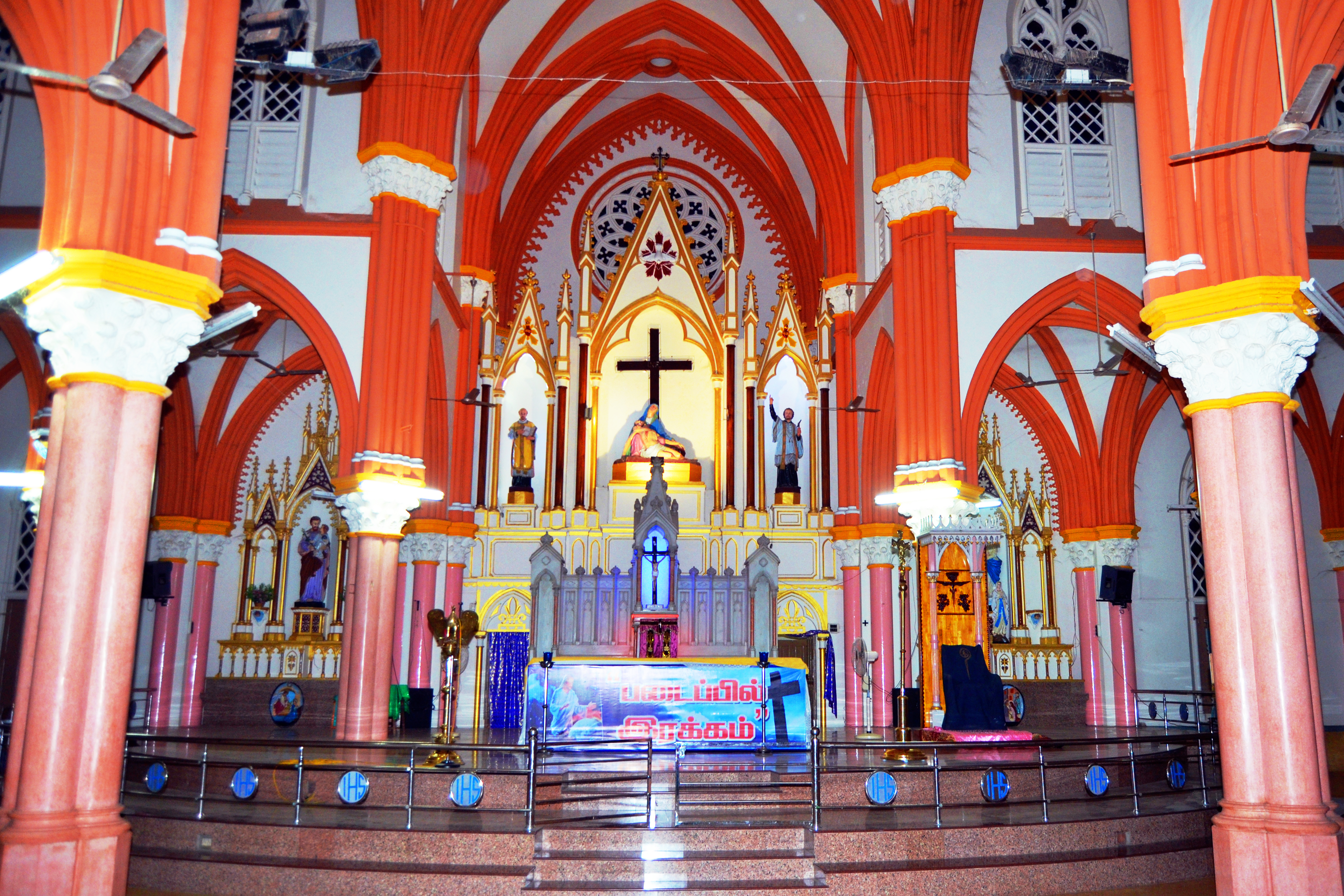
St. Mary's Cathedral main altar, Madurai
