= House at 1513 8th =

- U.S. National Register of Historic Places
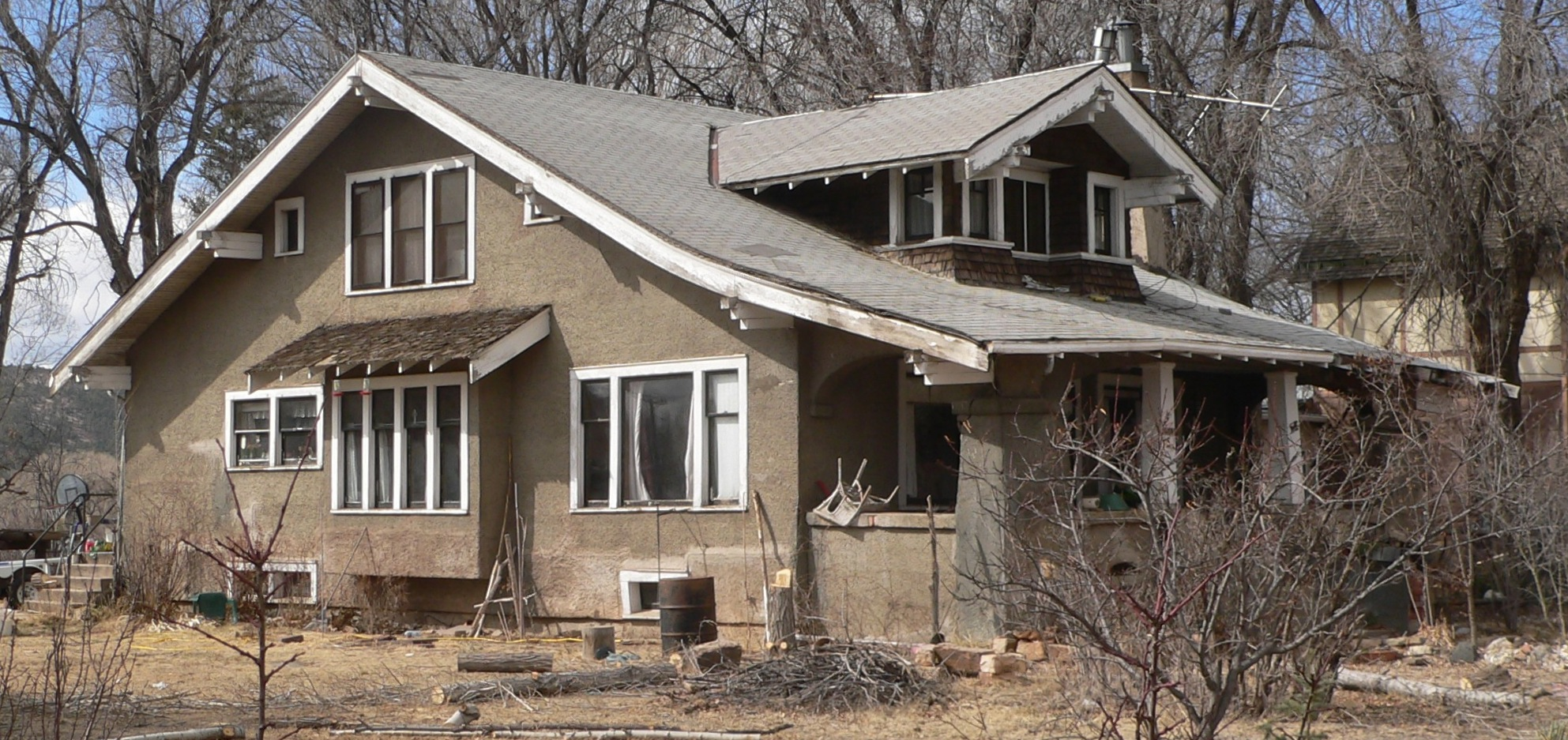

- Location within New Mexico
- Location: 1513 8th, Las Vegas, New Mexico
- Coordinates: 35°36′19″N 105°13′30″W
- Area: less than one acre
- Architectural style: Bungalow/craftsman
- MPS: Las Vegas New Mexico MRA
- NRHP reference No.: 85002634
- Added to NRHP: September 26, 1985

The House at 1513 8th in Las Vegas, New Mexico was listed on the National Register of Historic Places in 1985.

It was built as part of the "Eighth Street Extension".
