= Bean-Newlee House =

- U.S. National Register of Historic Places
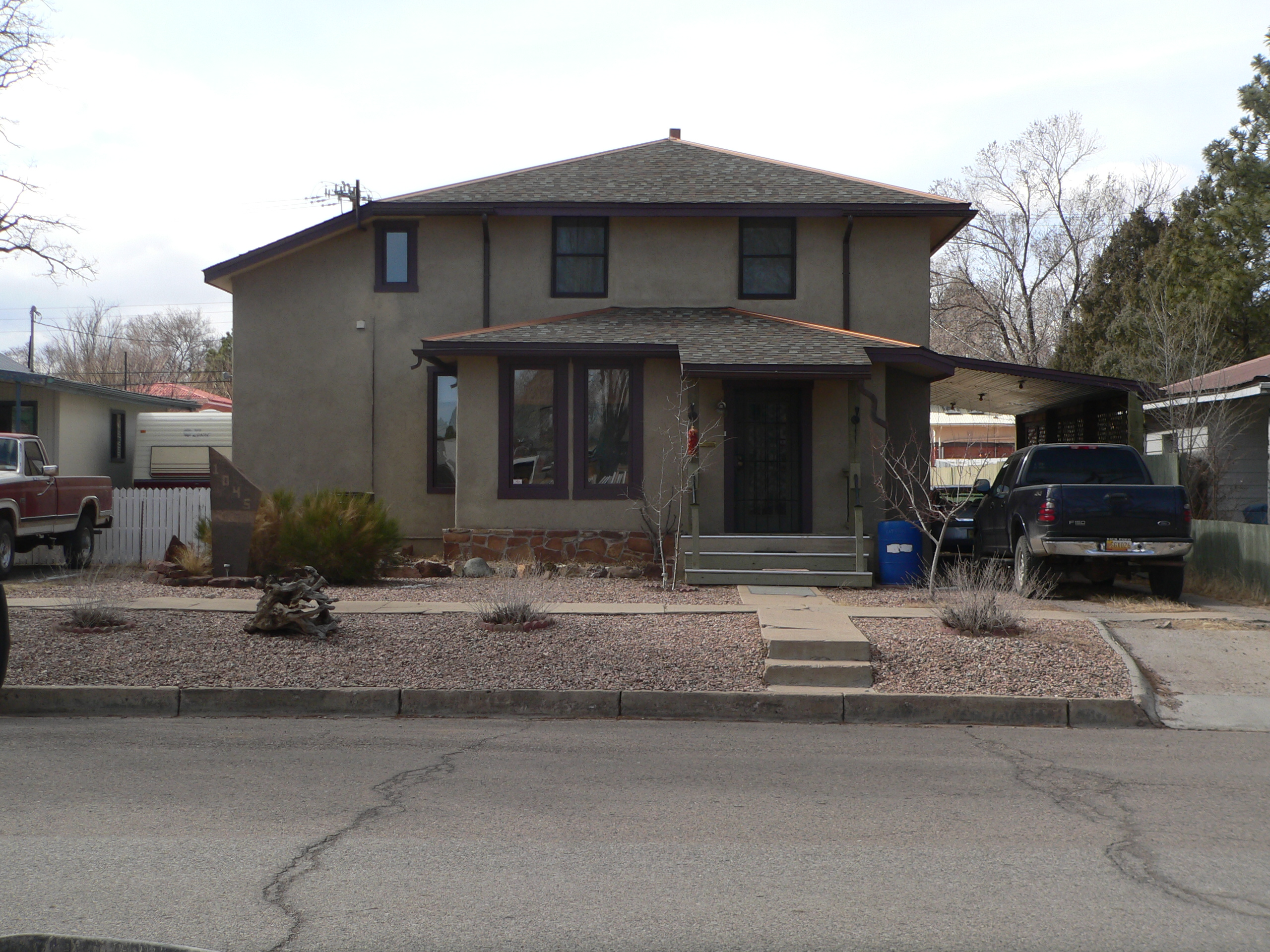

- Location within New Mexico
- Location: 1045 5th St., Las Vegas, New Mexico
- Coordinates: 35°36′04″N 105°13′04″W
- Area: less than one acre
- Built: c.1905
- Architectural style: Mission/spanish Revival
- MPS: Las Vegas New Mexico MRA
- NRHP reference No.: 85002625
- Added to NRHP: September 26, 1985

The Bean-Newlee House, at 1045 5th St. in Las Vegas, New Mexico, was built around 1905. It was listed on the National Register of Historic Places in 1985.

It is a stuccoed hipped roof house. It has American Foursquare massing but is deemed Mission/Spanish Revival overall in its style. The house was home in 1912 to P.A. Bean, a civil engineer, and to B.H. Newlee, another civil engineer, and his wife.
