= House at 931 Prince =

- U.S. National Register of Historic Places
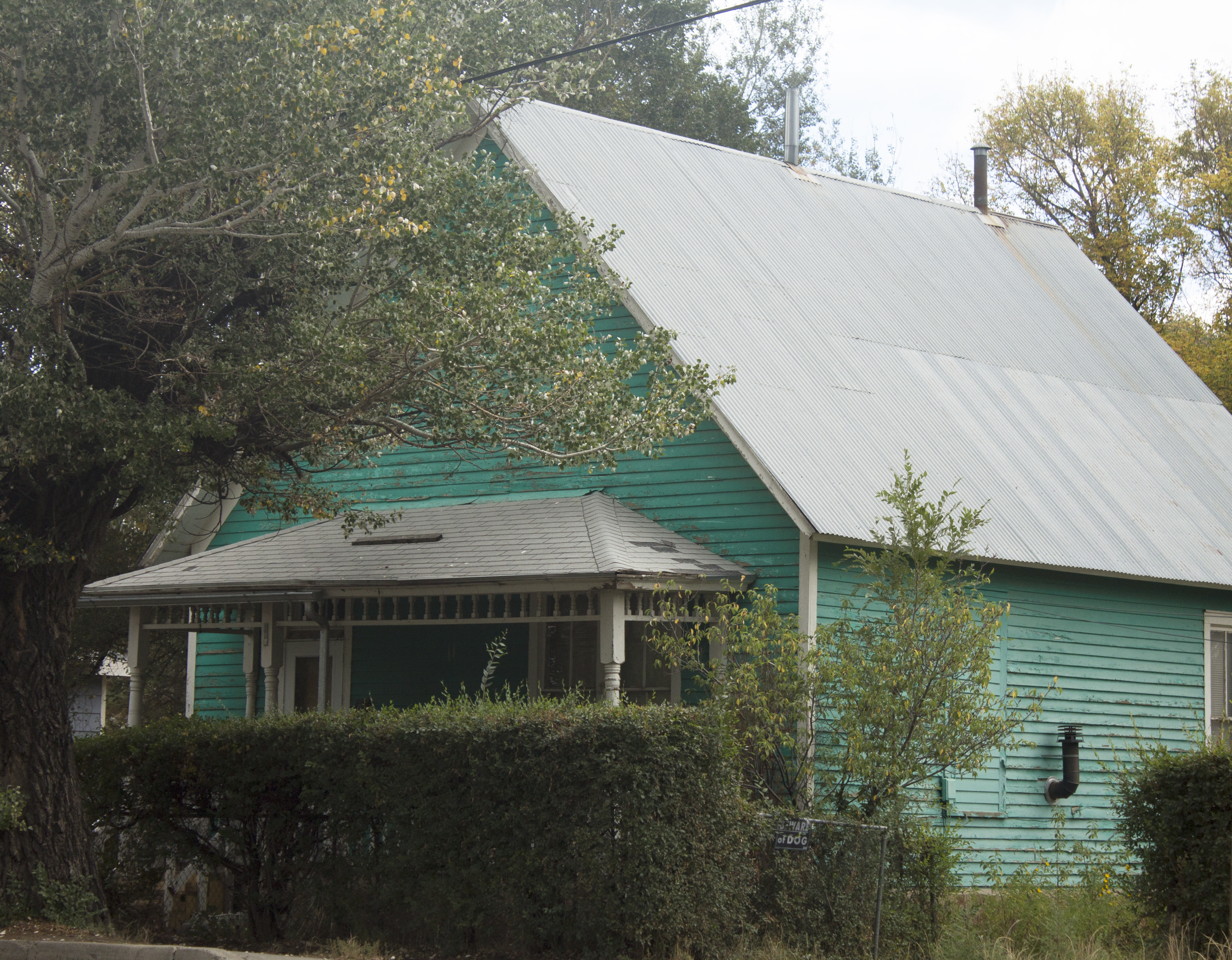
- 2012 photo

- Location within New Mexico
- Location: 931 Prince, Las Vegas, New Mexico
- Coordinates: 35°35′18″N 105°12′59″W
- Area: less than one acre
- Architectural style: Stick/eastlake, Queen Anne
- MPS: Las Vegas New Mexico MRA
- NRHP reference No.: 85002620
- Added to NRHP: September 26, 1985

The House at 931 Prince, in Las Vegas, New Mexico, was listed on the National Register of Historic Places in 1985.

The wood-frame house is built in the vernacular style locally employed in the 1890s, with stick work within their front-facing gables alluding to the formal Stick Style and with lathe-rounded porch posts suggestive of vernacular Queen Anne style. Houses built in the 1890s are larger than workers' houses built in the area in the 1880s, which also had front gable massing. The house at 931 Prince was, in 1985, one of "few intact examples" of its type.

A 2012 photo of the building shows that the stick work which had appeared in the 1982 photo accompanying the NRHP nomination, has been lost.
