= Baca-Korte House =

Historic house in New Mexico, United States

- U.S. National Register of Historic Places
- Location within New Mexico Location within the United States
- Location: 615 S. Pacific, Las Vegas, New Mexico
- Coordinates: 35°34′58″N 105°13′15″W
- Area: less than one acre
- Built: 1930
- Architectural style: Colonial Revival
- MPS: Las Vegas New Mexico MRA
- NRHP reference No.: 85002658
- Added to NRHP: September 26, 1985

The Baca-Korte House, at 615 S. Pacific in Las Vegas, New Mexico, was built in 1930. It was listed on the National Register of Historic Places in 1985.

It has rubble stone foundations and walls; its frame second floor loosely reflects Colonial Revival architecture.
