= Our Lady of Sorrows Church (Las Vegas, New Mexico) =

Historic church in New Mexico, United States

- U.S. National Register of Historic Places
- NM State Register of Cultural Properties
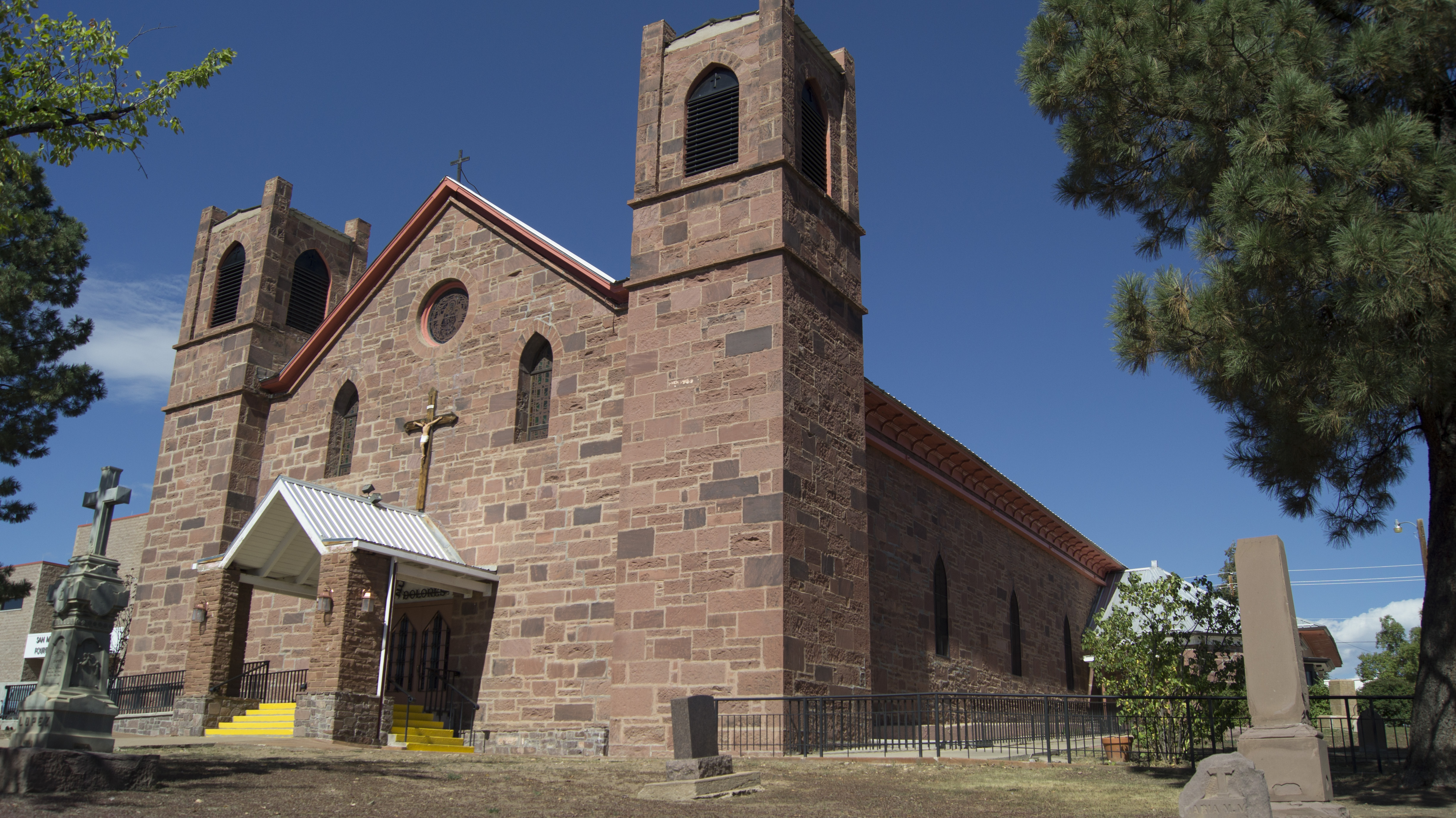
- Our Lady of Sorrows Church

- Location within New Mexico Location within the United States
- Location: W. National Ave., Las Vegas, New Mexico
- Coordinates: 35°35′31″N 105°13′43″W
- Area: 2.8 acres (1.1 ha)
- Built: 1852-1885
- Architectural style: Romanesque, Gothic Revival
- NRHP reference No.: 76001197
- NMSRCP No.: 318

Significant dates
- Added to NRHP: September 8, 1976
- Designated NMSRCP: March 1, 1974

Our Lady of Sorrows Church is a historic Roman Catholic church on W. National Avenue in Las Vegas, New Mexico. It was added to the National Register of Historic Places in 1976.

It is a red sandstone building which was started in 1852. Its interior was not complete until 1885.

== See also ==
- National Register of Historic Places listings in San Miguel County, New Mexico
