= Esperansa Herrera House =

- U.S. National Register of Historic Places
- Location within New Mexico
- Location: 2231 Church, Las Vegas, New Mexico
- Coordinates: 35°35′41″N 105°13′51″W
- Area: less than one acre
- MPS: Las Vegas New Mexico MRA
- NRHP reference No.: 85002613
- Added to NRHP: September 26, 1985

The Esperansa Herrera House, at 2231 Church in Las Vegas, New Mexico, was listed on the National Register of Historic Places in 1985.
