= Lowery Clevenger House =

- U.S. National Register of Historic Places
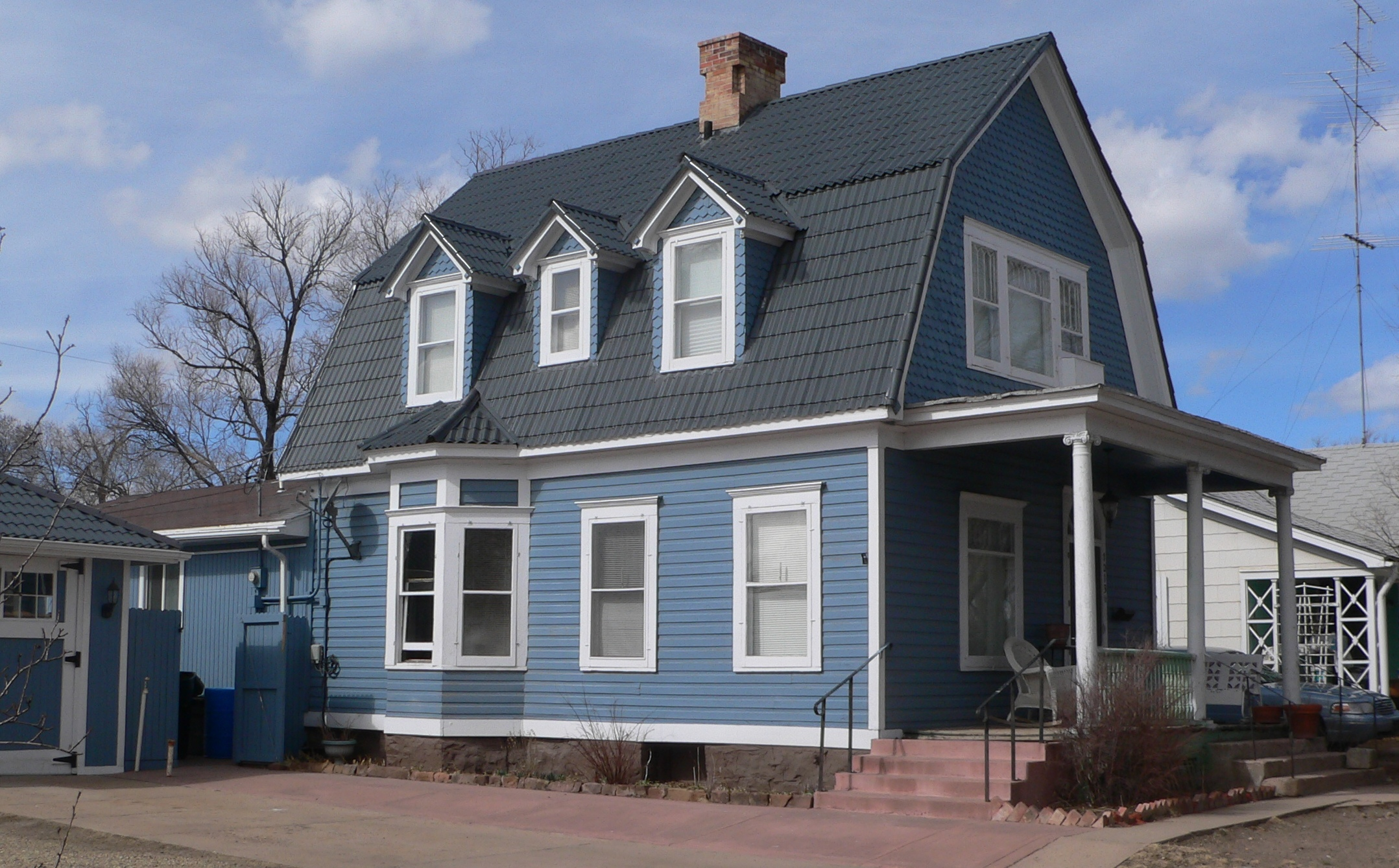

- Location within New Mexico
- Location: 1013 2nd, Las Vegas, New Mexico
- Coordinates: 35°36′05″N 105°12′49″W
- Area: less than one acre
- Built: c.1905
- Architectural style: Colonial Revival
- MPS: Las Vegas New Mexico MRA
- NRHP reference No.: 85002594
- Added to NRHP: September 26, 1985

The Lowery Clevenger House is a Colonial Revival wood-frame house, located at 1013 2nd in Las Vegas, New Mexico. Built around 1905, it was listed on the National Register of Historic Places in 1985. In 1919, it was the home of Santa Fe Railroad conductor Lowery Clevenger.
