= Building at 1214 Bridge =

- U.S. National Register of Historic Places
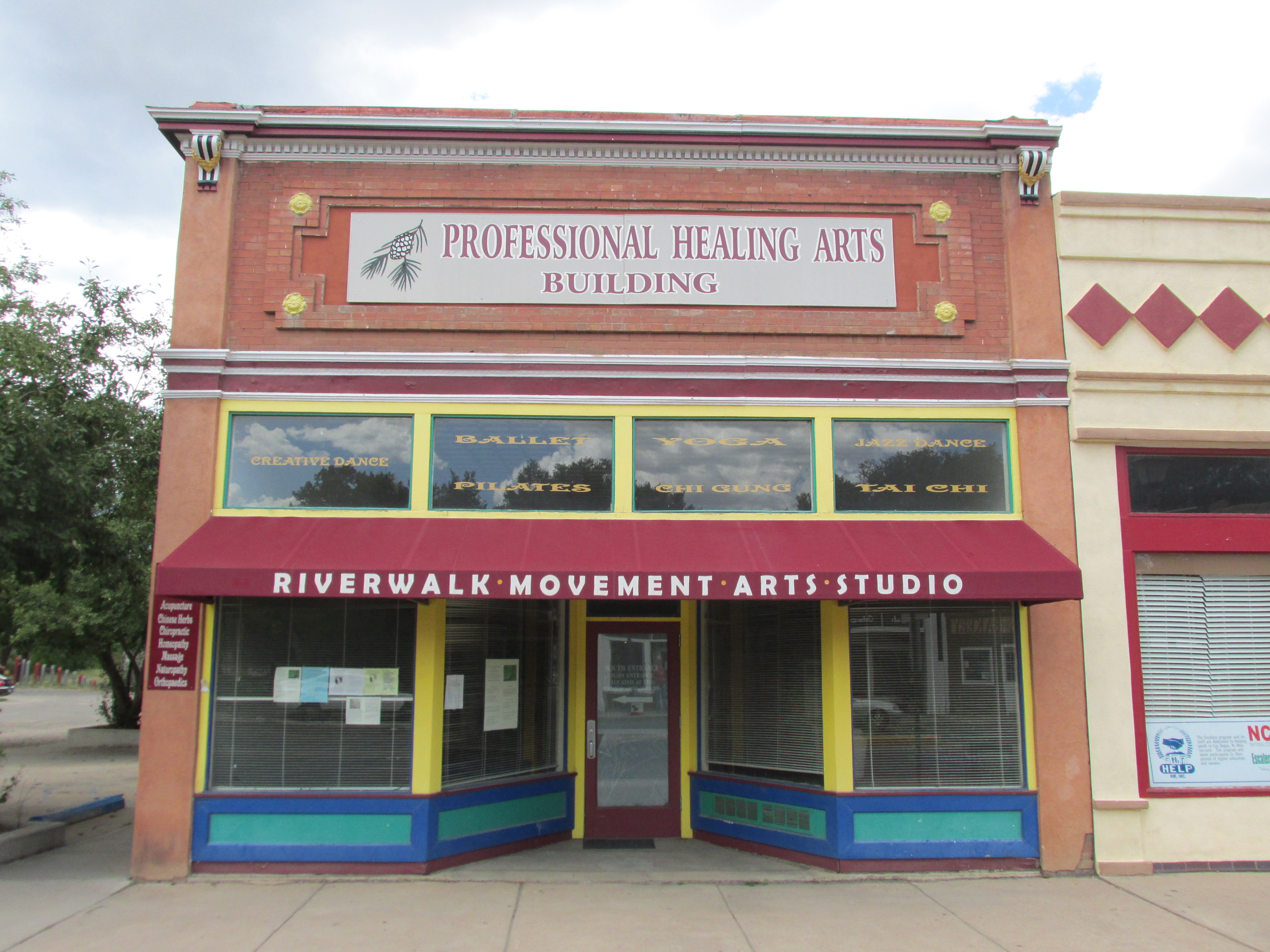

- Location within New Mexico
- Location: 1214 Bridge, Las Vegas, New Mexico
- Coordinates: 35°35′41″N 105°13′22″W
- Area: less than one acre
- Built: c.1902
- Architectural style: World's Fair Classic
- MPS: Las Vegas New Mexico MRA
- NRHP reference No.: 85002660
- Added to NRHP: September 26, 1985

The Building at 1214 Bridge in Las Vegas, New Mexico was listed on the National Register of Historic Places in 1985.

It was built between 1889 and 1902, and is "a modest-sized but fully detailed World's Fair Classic building. The original doors and windows have been replaced and the transom is covered, but the original brick work and pressed metal details above remain intact. It is one of three relatively unaltered buildings (ill. 28, 29) in the half block extension of the Plaza/Bridge Street commercial area which reached across the river toward New Town at the turn of the century. By 1930, this building had already served as a hardware store, a grocery, a notions shop, and a bakery."
