= House at 16 Grand =

- U.S. National Register of Historic Places
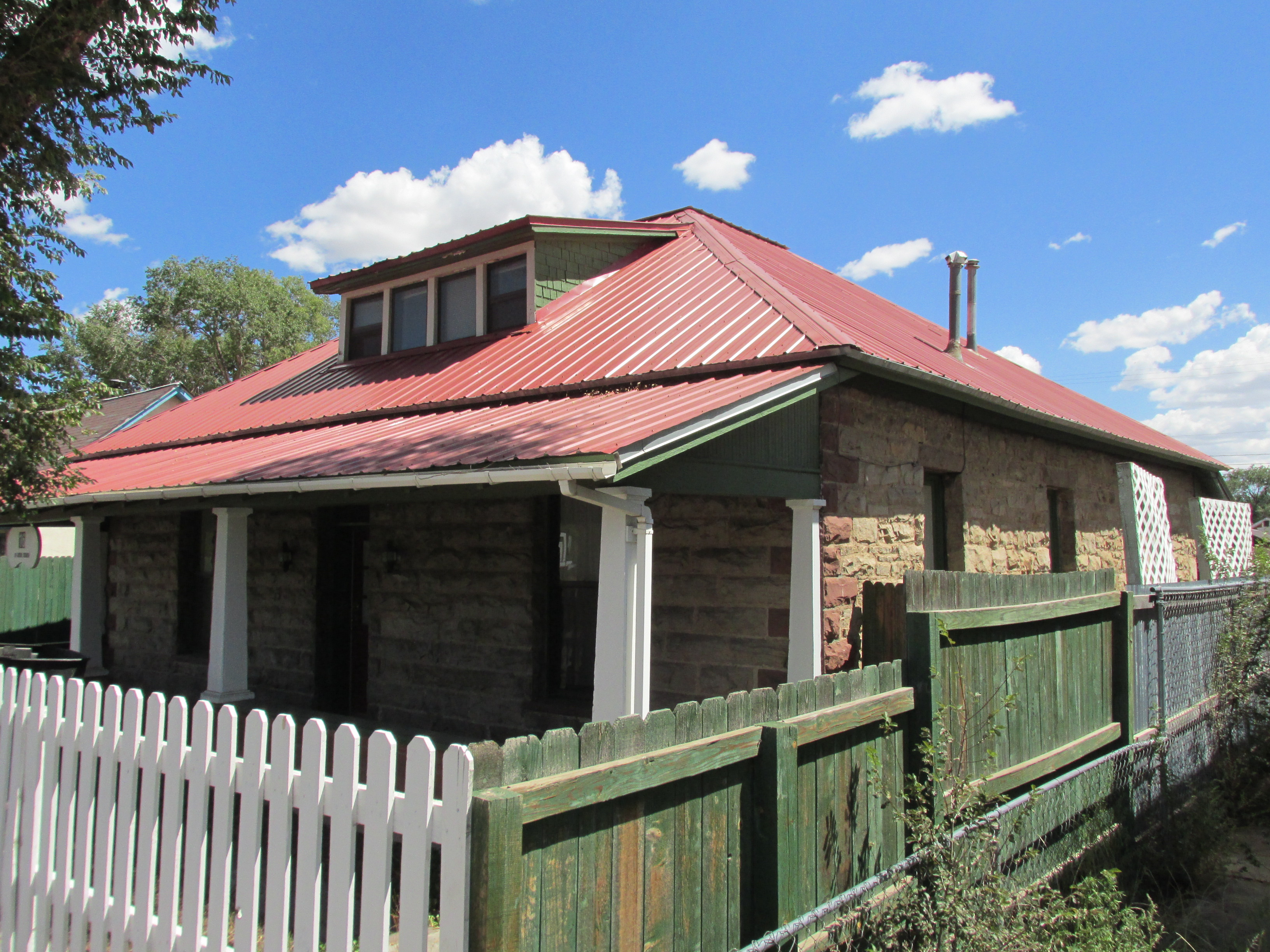

- Location within New Mexico
- Location: 16 Grand, Las Vegas, New Mexico
- Coordinates: 35°35′18″N 105°12′53″W
- Area: less than one acre
- Built: c.1902
- Architectural style: Bungalow/craftsman
- MPS: Las Vegas New Mexico MRA
- NRHP reference No.: 85002623
- Added to NRHP: September 26, 1985

The House at 16 Grand, at 16 Grand Avenue in Las Vegas, New Mexico, was built in 1883. It was listed on the National Register of Historic Places in 1985.

It has front and rear shed-roofed porches, along the long sides of the rectangular building, and is built upon a sandstone foundation. The house was built in 1883; the porches were added and dormers were modified in the 1920s.

It forms "an interesting pair" with its next-door neighbor, the House at 12 Grand, which was almost identical but was not later remodelled.
