= Building at 1202 9th Street =

- U.S. National Register of Historic Places
- Location within New Mexico
- Location: 1202 9th St., Las Vegas, New Mexico
- Coordinates: 35°36′02″N 105°13′20″W
- Area: less than one acre
- Architectural style: Wood Vernacular
- MPS: Las Vegas New Mexico MRA
- NRHP reference No.: 85002632
- Added to NRHP: September 26, 1985

The Building at 1202 9th Street, in Las Vegas, New Mexico, was listed on the National Register of Historic Places in 1985.

It is a stucco over wood-frame vernacular house with a U-shaped plan.

It was deemed significant as "An interesting, well maintained Wood Vernacular house. The front portion employs the simplest form of the center hall plan while the rear parts of this unusual U-shaped building can not be read from the outside. The porch is a particularly fine example of the local use of picturesque wooden ornament during the 1880s. Boards wrapping the posts suggest "bases". Above these, two horizontal grooves frame applied round bosses, then comes chamfering and vertical indentations topped by another set of grooves and bosses, and finally stock wooden brackets. Another set of simpler, cut-out brackets rotated to the horizontal complete the design."

Located at the eastern edge of the Gallinas River flood plain, it "once stood by itself on the Old Mora Road (now Ninth Street)" but now is located in a block of newer houses, near to Highlands University athletic fields.
