= Douglas Avenue School =

- U.S. National Register of Historic Places
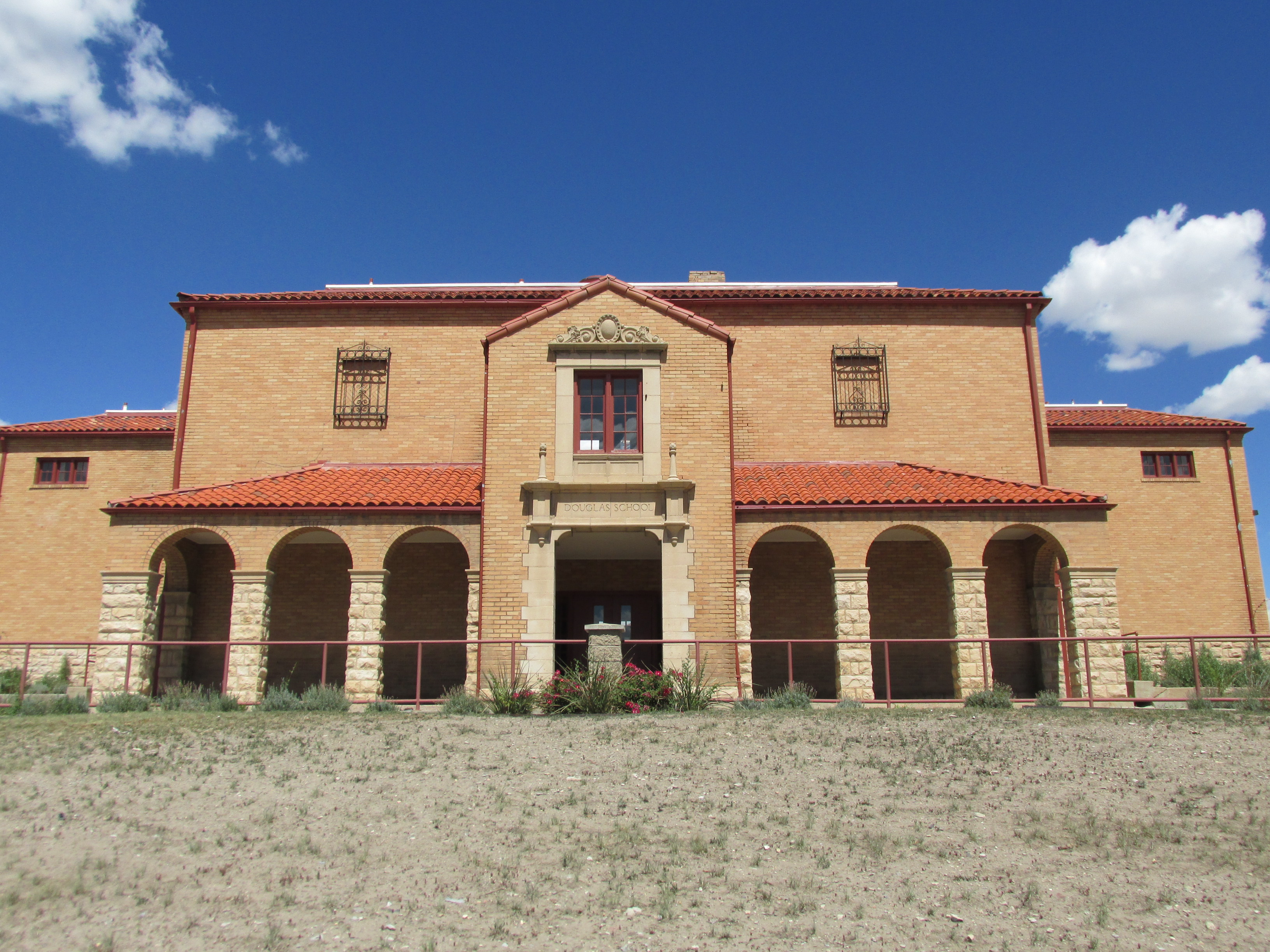

- Location within New Mexico
- Location: 900 Douglas Ave., Las Vegas, New Mexico
- Coordinates: 35°35′35″N 105°13′06″W
- Area: 1 acre (0.40 ha)
- Built: 1928
- Built by: Sundt, N.M.
- Architect: Meem & Mccormick
- Architectural style: Spanish Colonial Revival
- MPS: Las Vegas New Mexico MRA (AD)
- NRHP reference No.: 83001625
- Added to NRHP: August 5, 1983

The Douglas Avenue School, at 900 Douglas Ave. in Las Vegas, New Mexico was built in 1928. It was listed on the National Register of Historic Places in 1983.

It is a two-story, Spanish Colonial Revival-style building with a T-shaped plan. It was "an early, important work" of architect John Gaw Meem, who worked at the time with business partner Cassius McCormick.
