= Arturo Angel House =

- U.S. National Register of Historic Places
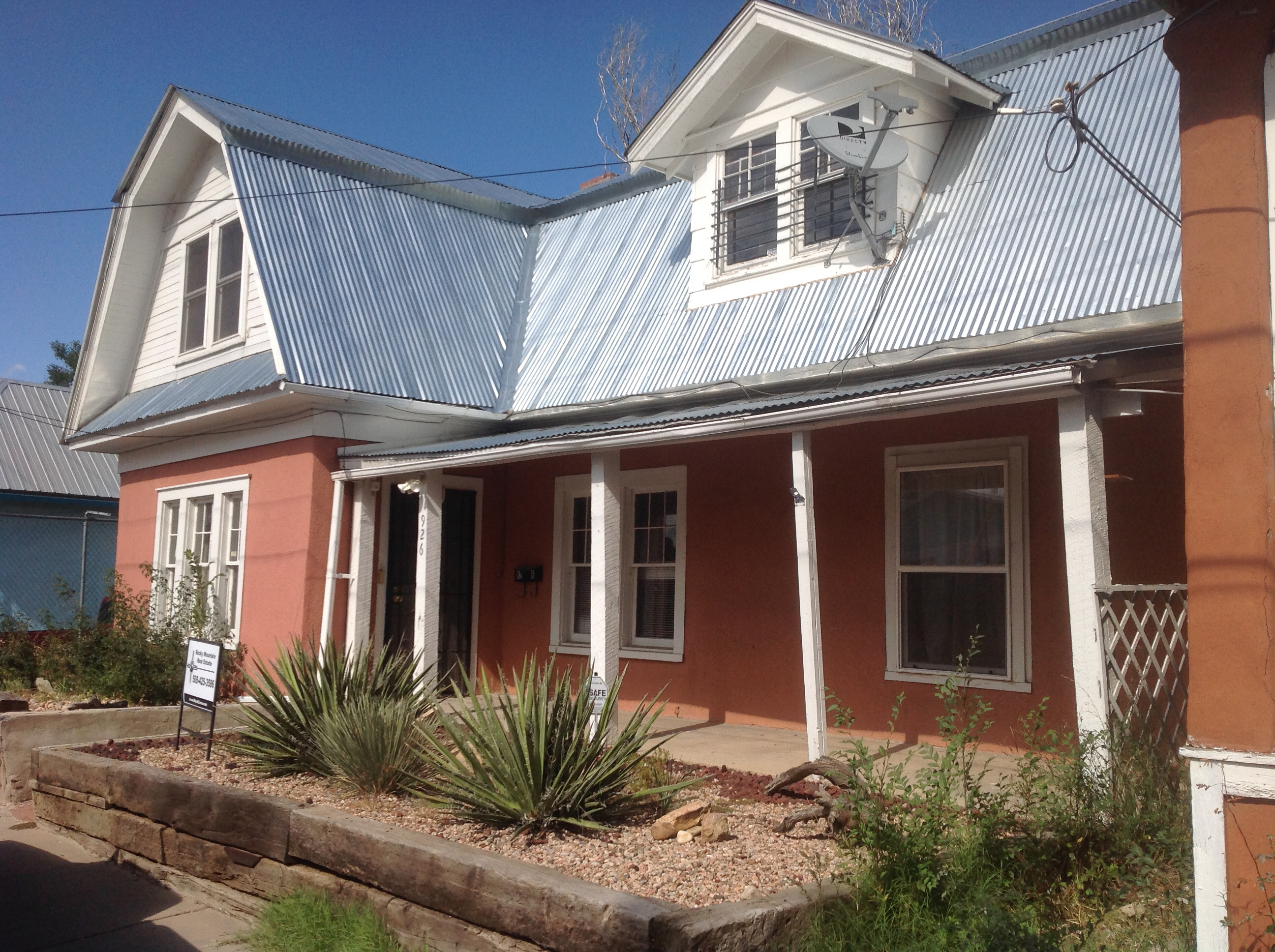

- Location within New Mexico
- Location: 926 S. Pacific, Las Vegas, New Mexico
- Coordinates: 35°35′12″N 105°13′22″W
- Area: less than one acre
- Architectural style: Colonial Revival, Bungalow/craftsman, Tudor Revival
- MPS: Las Vegas New Mexico MRA
- NRHP reference No.: 85002604
- Added to NRHP: September 26, 1985

The Arturo Angel House, at 926 S. Pacific in Las Vegas, New Mexico, was listed on the National Register of Historic Places in 1985.

Its NRHP nomination states: "This particular combination of the Hispanic adobe tradition with late Anglo introduction from the Colonial Revival and, to a lesser extent, from the Bungalow Style, is unique in Las Vegas. The Colonial Revival houses built in New Town after 1900 typically had brick first floors and intersecting frame gables or gambrel roofs over a square or rectangular shape. The builder here substitutes adobe for brick, but retains the traditional single file(s) of rooms, in a T-shape. The narrowness of the base requires the lengthening of the first slope of the gambrel roof to maintain usable second floor space. That roof and the three-part window group recall the Colonial Revival Style; the exposed rafters of the dormers, the Bungalow Style; and the continuous lintels, the local Tudor Style. Arturo, then Ramundo Angel lived here."
