= Distrito de las Escuelas =

- U.S. National Register of Historic Places
- Location within New Mexico
- Location: S. Pacific and S. Gonzales Sts., Las Vegas, New Mexico
- Coordinates: 35°35′32″N 105°13′31″W
- Area: 12 acres (4.9 ha)
- Built: c.1835-36
- Architectural style: Territorial;Spanish Colonial
- MPS: Las Vegas New Mexico MRA (AD)
- NRHP reference No.: 80002567
- Added to NRHP: March 18, 1980

The Distrito de las Escuelas is a historic district in Las Vegas, New Mexico. It was listed on the National Register of Historic Places in 1980. The listing included 44 contributing buildings on 12 acres (4.9 ha)

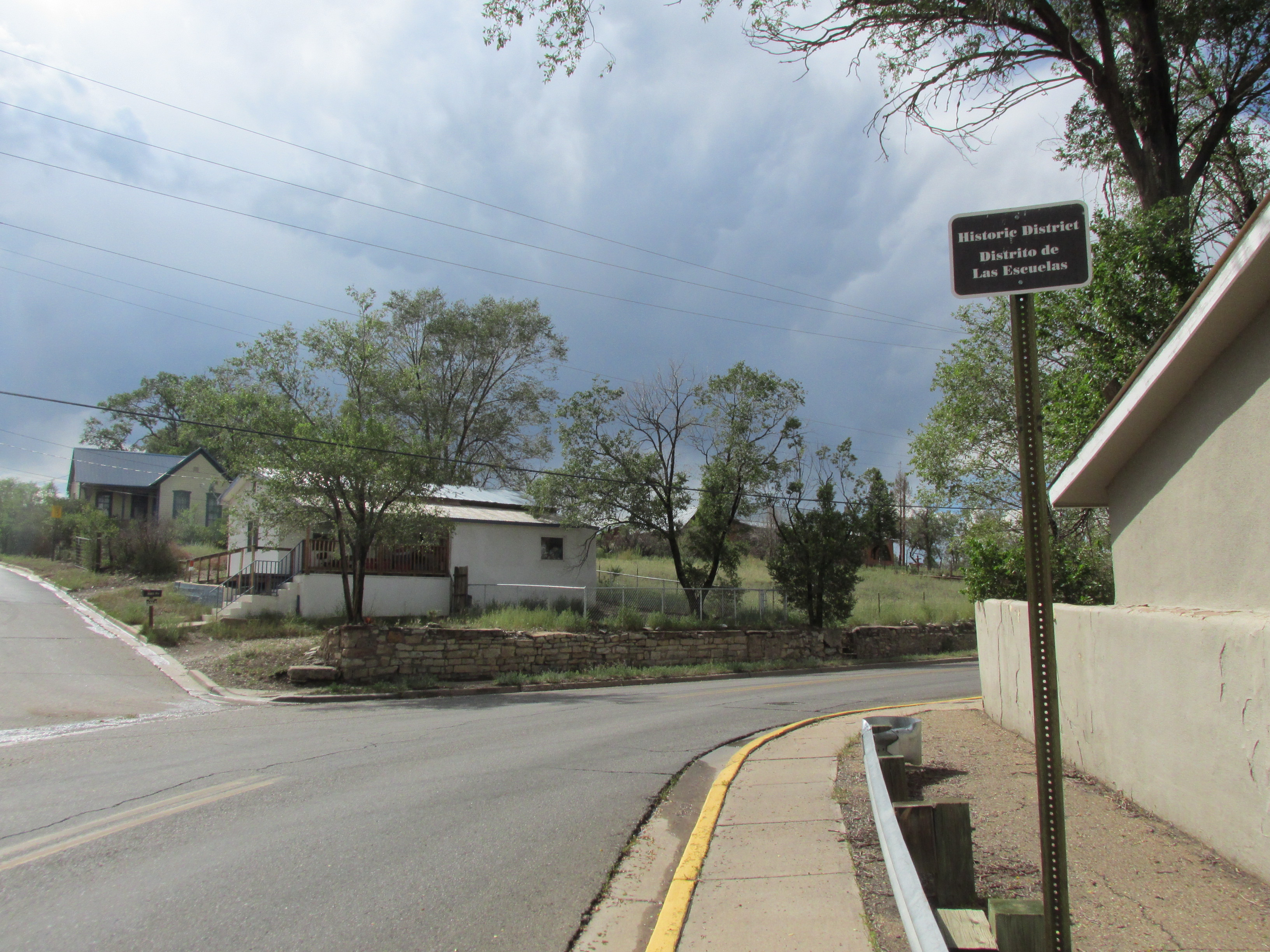
Entering the district on S. Pacific Street

It is a residential district of adobe houses. It includes Territorial and Spanish Colonial architecture. Its name is due to the nearby presence of an old Jesuit School and the West Las Vegas Schools.

The district extends along two streets running south from Las Vegas' Plaza, S. Pacific St. and S. Gonzales St., plus along a cross-street, Moreno St.??

This district plus the Old Town Residential Historic District comprise the majority of the historic adobe area of Las Vegas.

"Today the district is one of adobe houses of various sizes and ages. This area has a remarkable coherence, with its low adobe buildings set close to the street interspersed with houses from the railroad era. There are surprisingly few buildings that detract from the character created by the two types of houses. The district's boundary is drawn to maintain this coherence. Throughout Old Town there are structures of similar quality, but the coherence found in this area is lacking."

"All of the structures in the district are identified as being significant, contributing, neutral, or intrusive. Those structures which are significant have architectural or historic value in their own right. Those that are contributing are important to the district, but have less value. Neutral structures, in their material and scale, neither add to nor subtract from the overall character, and intrusive structures detract from the character."

"The district extends along three streets, two of them south from the Plaza, The third is a cross the street. South Pacific was a major throughfare almost from the start, as it was the route of the Santa Fe Trail. Therefore a number of buildings, especially those which have no setback, date to the early years of Las Vegas 1 settlement."
