= Douglas-Sixth Street Historic District =

- U.S. National Register of Historic Places
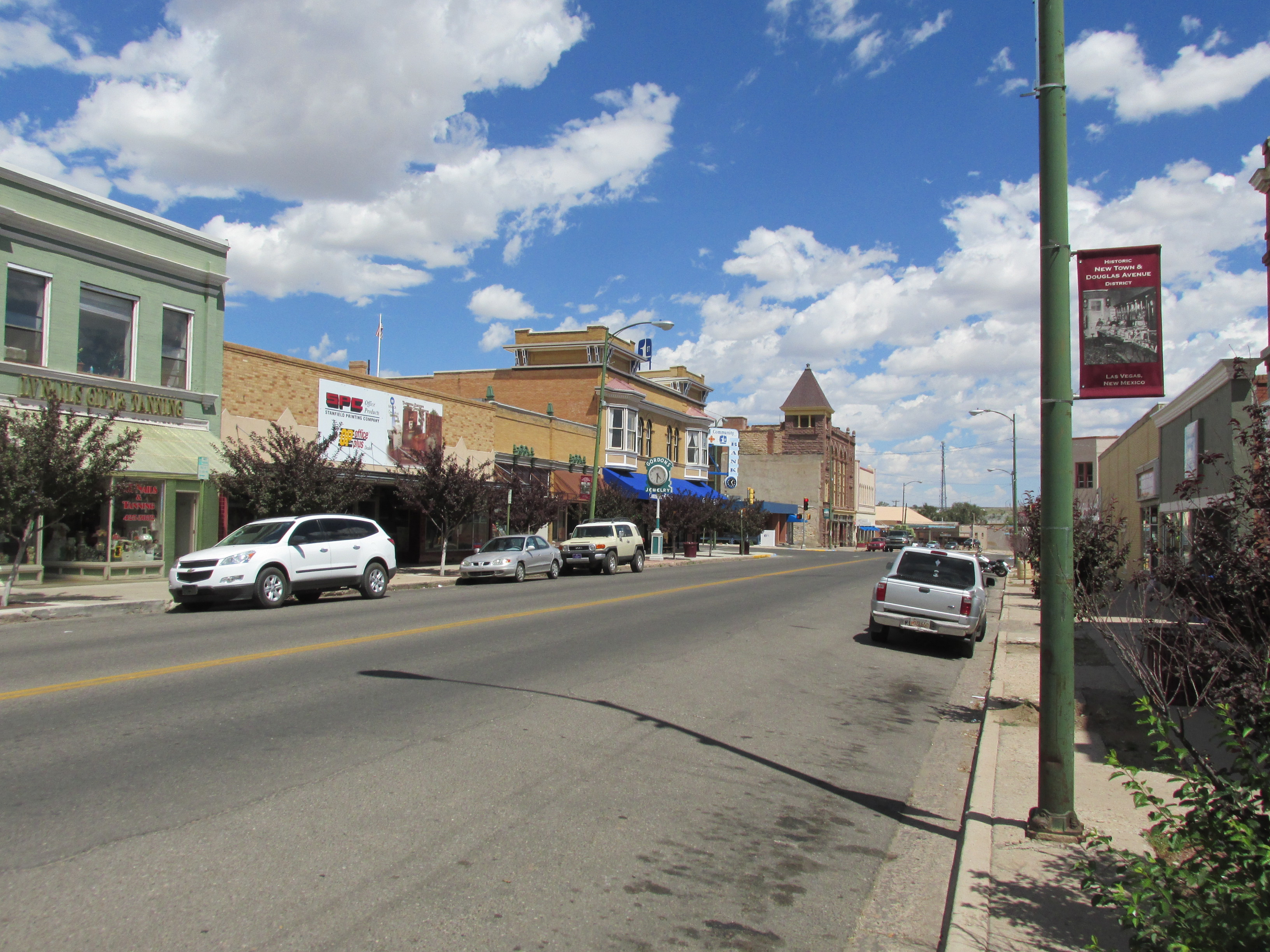

- Location within New Mexico
- Location: Roughly bounded by Grand, Lincoln, and 7th Sts., and University Ave., Las Vegas, New Mexico
- Coordinates: 35°35′41″N 105°12′14″W
- Area: 9 acres (3.6 ha)
- Built: 1879
- Built by: Multiple
- Architect: Isaac H. Rapp et al.
- Architectural style: Late 19th and 20th Century Revivals, Late Victorian
- MPS: Las Vegas New Mexico MRA (AD)
- NRHP reference No.: 83001626
- Added to NRHP: July 21, 1983

The Douglas-Sixth Street Historic District, in Las Vegas, New Mexico, is a historic district which was listed on the National Register of Historic Places in 1983. The listing included 18 contributing buildings, a contributing site, and two contributing objects.

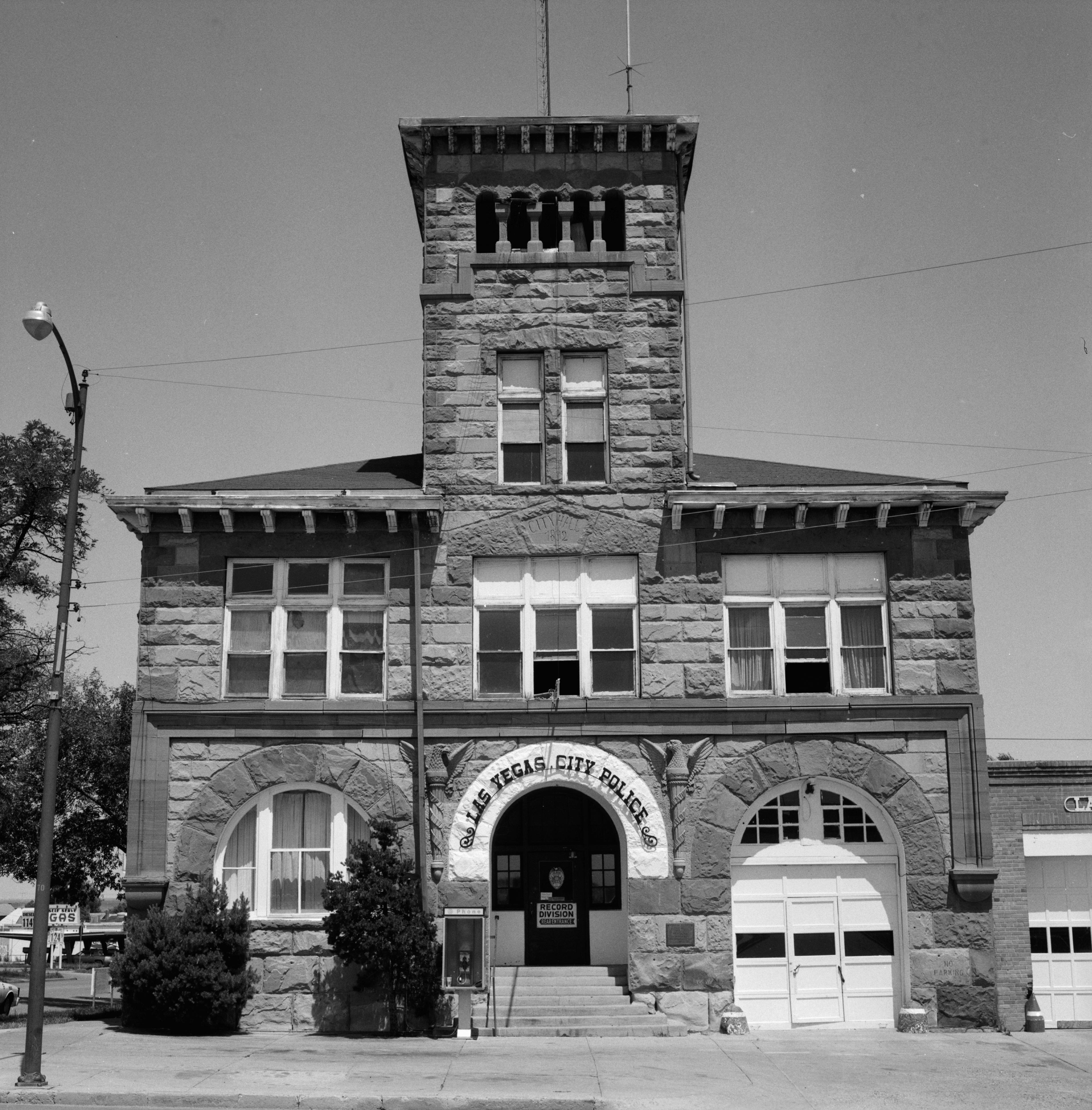
Municipal Building/Old City Hall

The district is 9 acres (3.6 ha) in area and is roughly bounded by Grand St., Lincoln St., 7th St., and University Ave.

It was deemed significant as "the best example of a turn-of-the-century commercial and institutional center remaining in New Mexico. In addition to stores, offices and banks, the district housed various institutions of civic improvement, including the state's first city hall, an opera house (now demolished), a Masonic Temple and a YMCA. Its buildings retain the scale, space, and—to a large extent— the architectural quality of the district as it had developed by 1922. The buildings represent a sometimes provincial, though competent, realization of a variety of architectural styles originating in the East and California. The district contains a significant collection of buildings (at least four and perhaps as many as eight) designed by the important, though little studied, Western architects, Isaac H. Rapp and William M. Rapp. Of secondary significance, the district contains three examples of local stonecarving and, in addition, represents a typical example of railroad-era, speculative town planning."

It includes the Masonic Temple, at 514 Douglas, (see photos 5, 8, 18), a Richardsonian Romanesque structure built in 1894–95, designed by Rapp & Rapp and built by W.F. Kean during 1894–95.
