= New Mexico vernacular =

New Mexico vernacular is a style of vernacular architecture.

It developed from the c.1870s to c.1940s.

One typical form is the one-story hipped box massing, with very limited ornamentation or no ornamentation at all. The elements of spare ornamentation might include "Italianate brackets and scroll-sawn ornament, lathe-turned or square chamfered columns, wood shingles on gable ends, and diamond-patterned windows".

== See also ==
- Territorial Style, earlier or contemporaneous style in New Mexico
- Territorial Revival architecture
