= Town square =

Open public spaces in cities or towns, usually rectilinear, surrounded by buildings

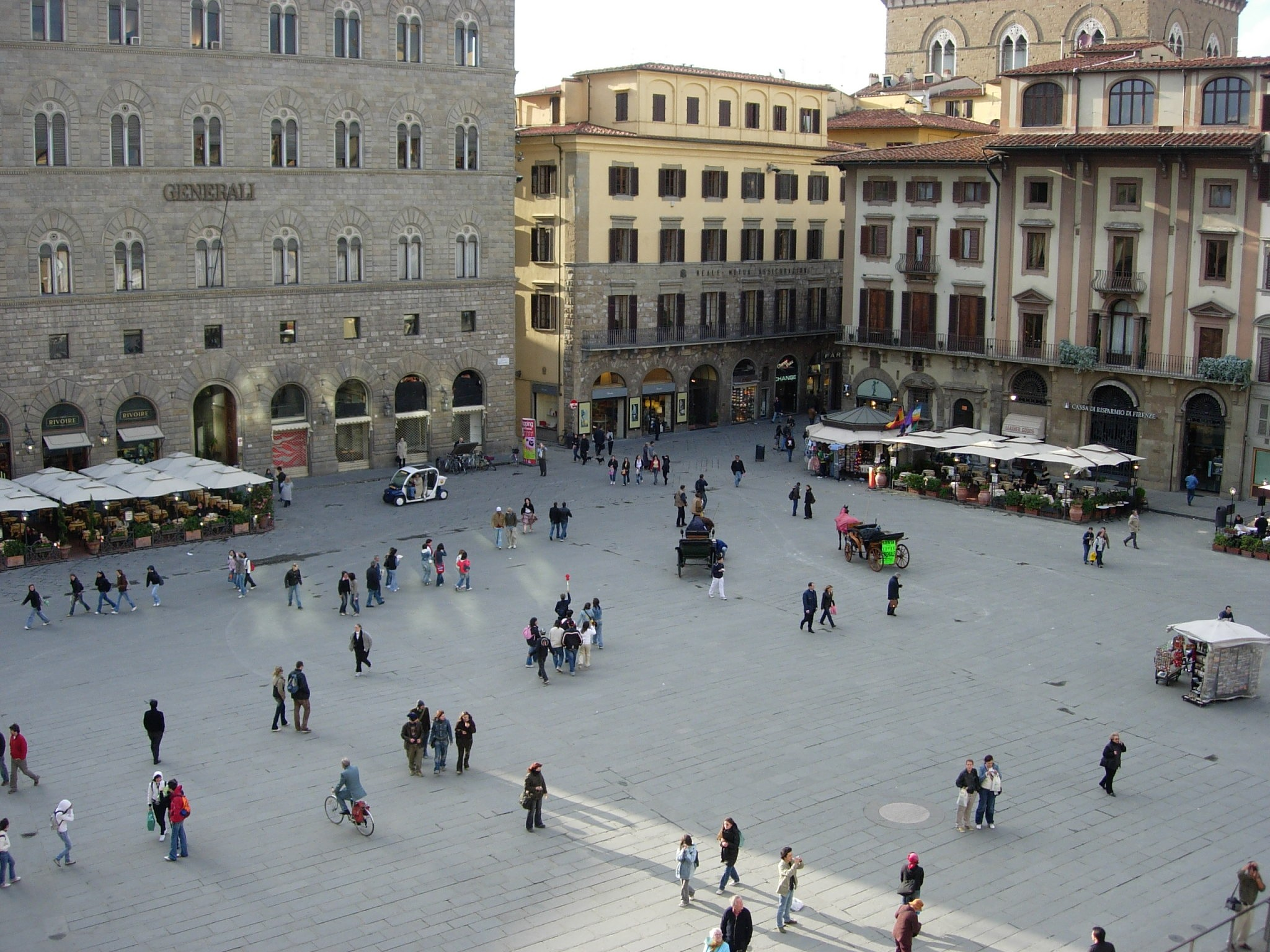
Piazza della Signoria, in Florence, Italy, a historic example of a traditional public square

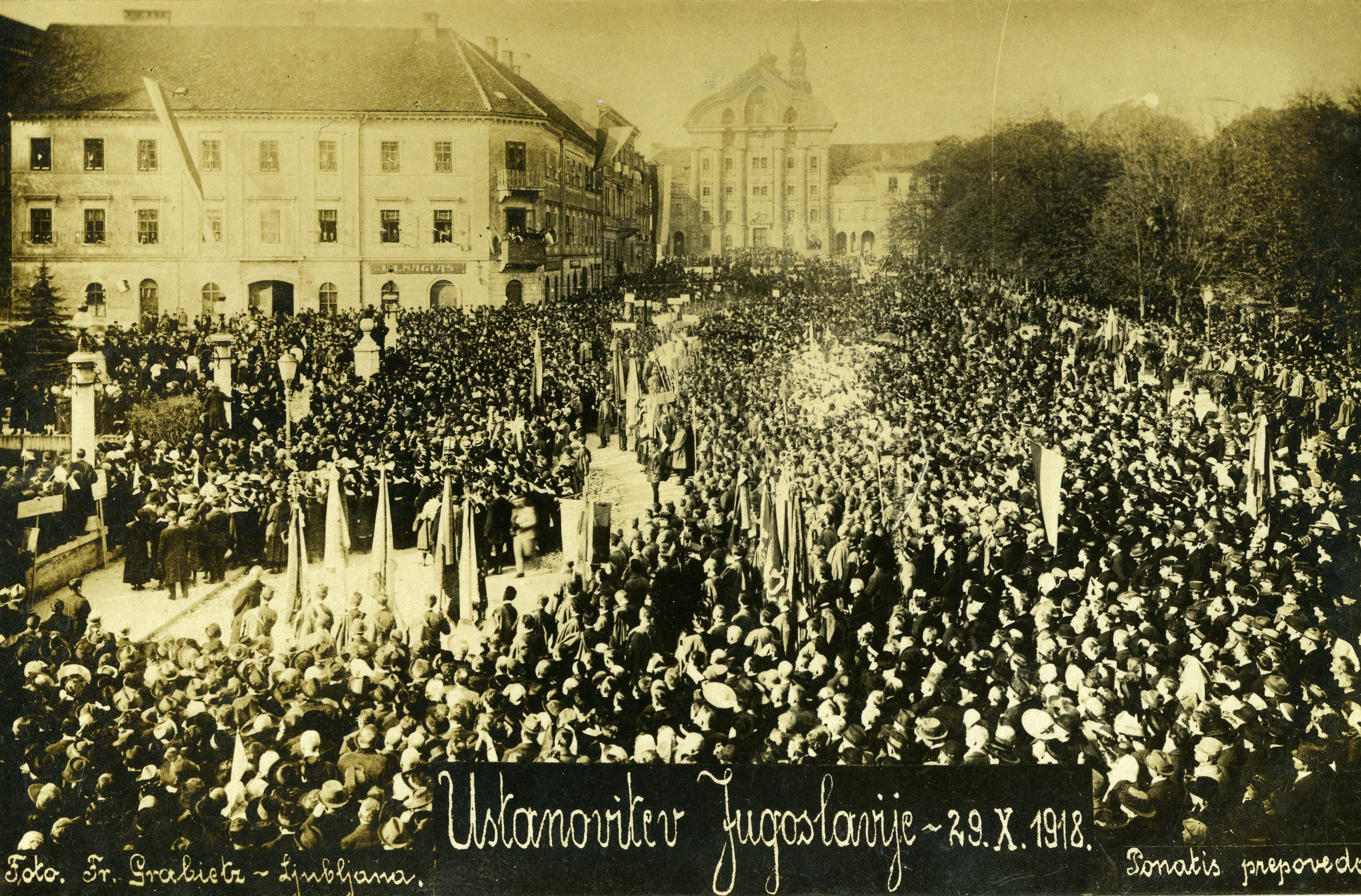
Announcement of the establishment of the State of Slovenes, Croats and Serbs on Congress Square in 1918

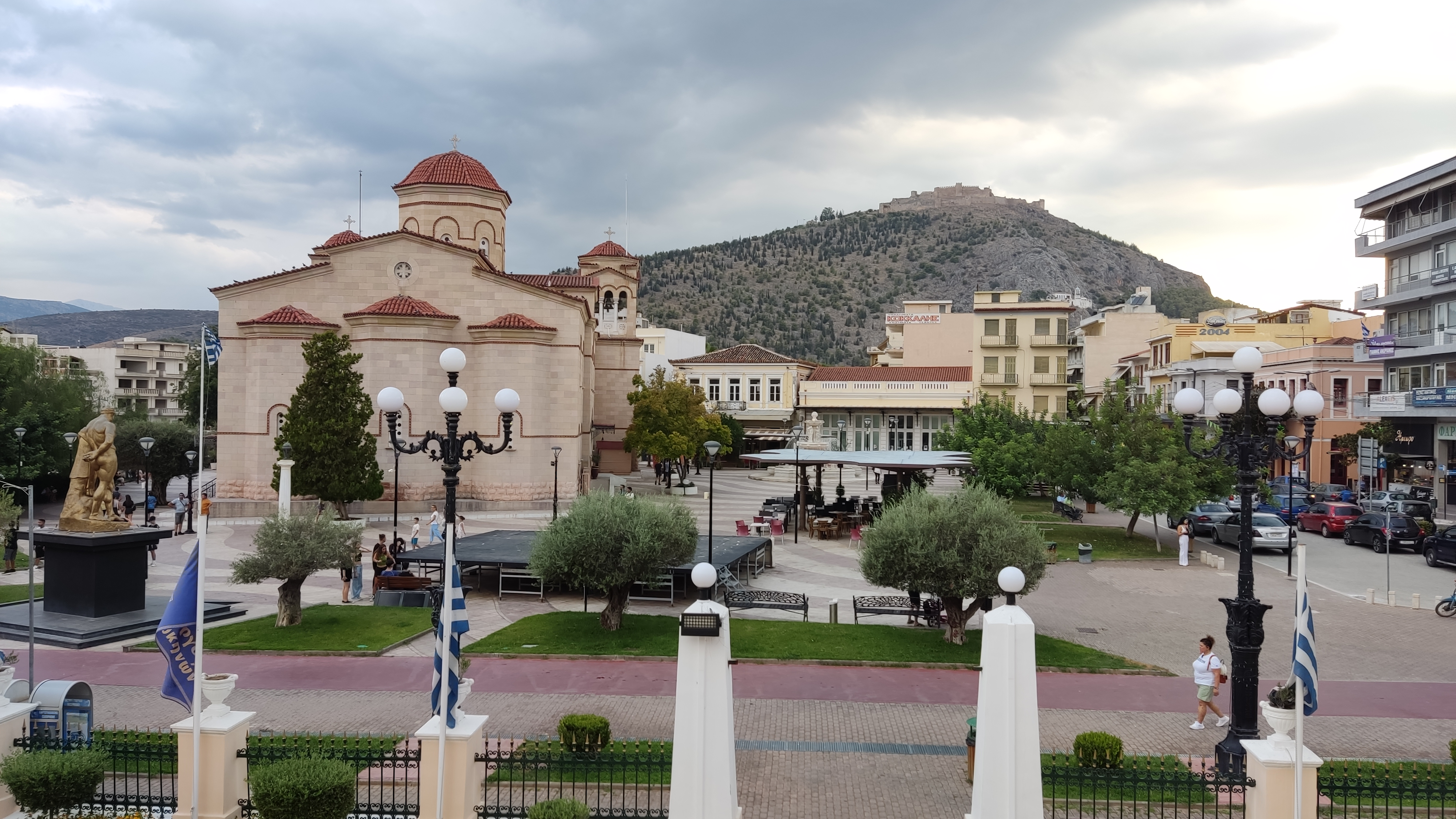
The Saint Peter's Square is the heart of the Greek city of Argos.

A town square (or public square, urban square, city square or simply square), also called a plaza or piazza, is an open public space commonly found in the heart of a traditional town or city, and which may sometimes be used for community gatherings. Related concepts are the civic center, the market square and the village green.

Most squares are hardscapes suitable for open markets, concerts, political rallies, and other events that require firm ground. They are not necessarily a true geometric square.

Being centrally located, town squares are often surrounded by small shops such as bakeries, meat markets, cheese stores, and clothing stores. At their center is often a well, monument, statue or other feature. Those with fountains are sometimes called fountain squares.

The term "town square" (especially via the term "public square") is synonymous with the politics of many cultures, and the names of a certain town squares, such as the Euromaidan and Red Square, have become symbolic of specific political events throughout history.

== Etymology ==
The word "square" entered the English language via the Old French word esquarre or esquare in the mid-13th century, which itself stems from the Vulgar Latin word exquadrare (meaning "to square" or "to quadrate"). The earliest known recorded use of the compound term "town square" was in a 1769 edition of St. James's Chronicle.

== Australia ==
Many cities in Australia's eastern states, such as Melbourne and Sydney, did not have a central town square in their design, due to a fear of rebellion. New South Wales Governors Richard Bourke and George Gipps notably ordered surveyors to not include a town square in city designs, including Melbourne, to prevent the spirit of democracy from arising.

The city centre of Adelaide and the adjacent suburb of North Adelaide, in South Australia, were planned by Colonel William Light in 1837. The city streets were laid out in a grid plan, with the city centre including a central public square, Victoria Square, and four public squares in the centre of each quarter of the city. North Adelaide has two public squares. The city was also designed to be surrounded by park lands, and all of these features still exist today, with the squares maintained as mostly green spaces.

In 2025, the City of Sydney council approved plans to accelerate the construction of a public square near the current Town Hall.

== China ==
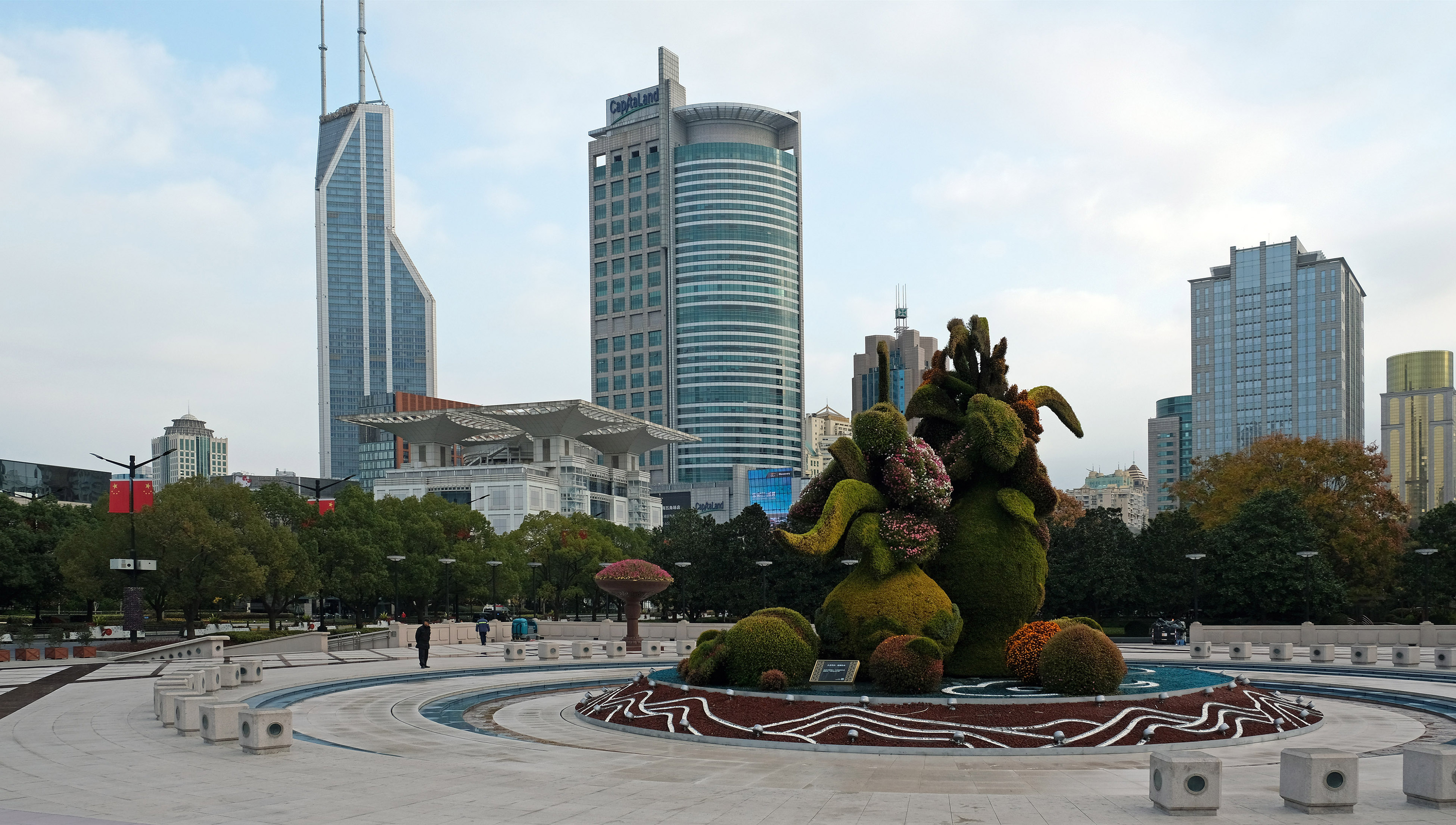
Fountain in People's Square in Shanghai, China

In China, People's Square is a common designation for the central town square of modern Chinese cities, established as part of urban modernization within the last few decades. These squares are the site of government buildings, museums, and other public buildings. One such square, Tiananmen Square, is a famous site in Chinese history due to it being the site of the May Fourth Movement, the Proclamation of the People's Republic of China, the 1976 Tiananmen Incident, the 1989 Tiananmen Square Protests, and all Chinese National Day Parades.

== Egypt ==
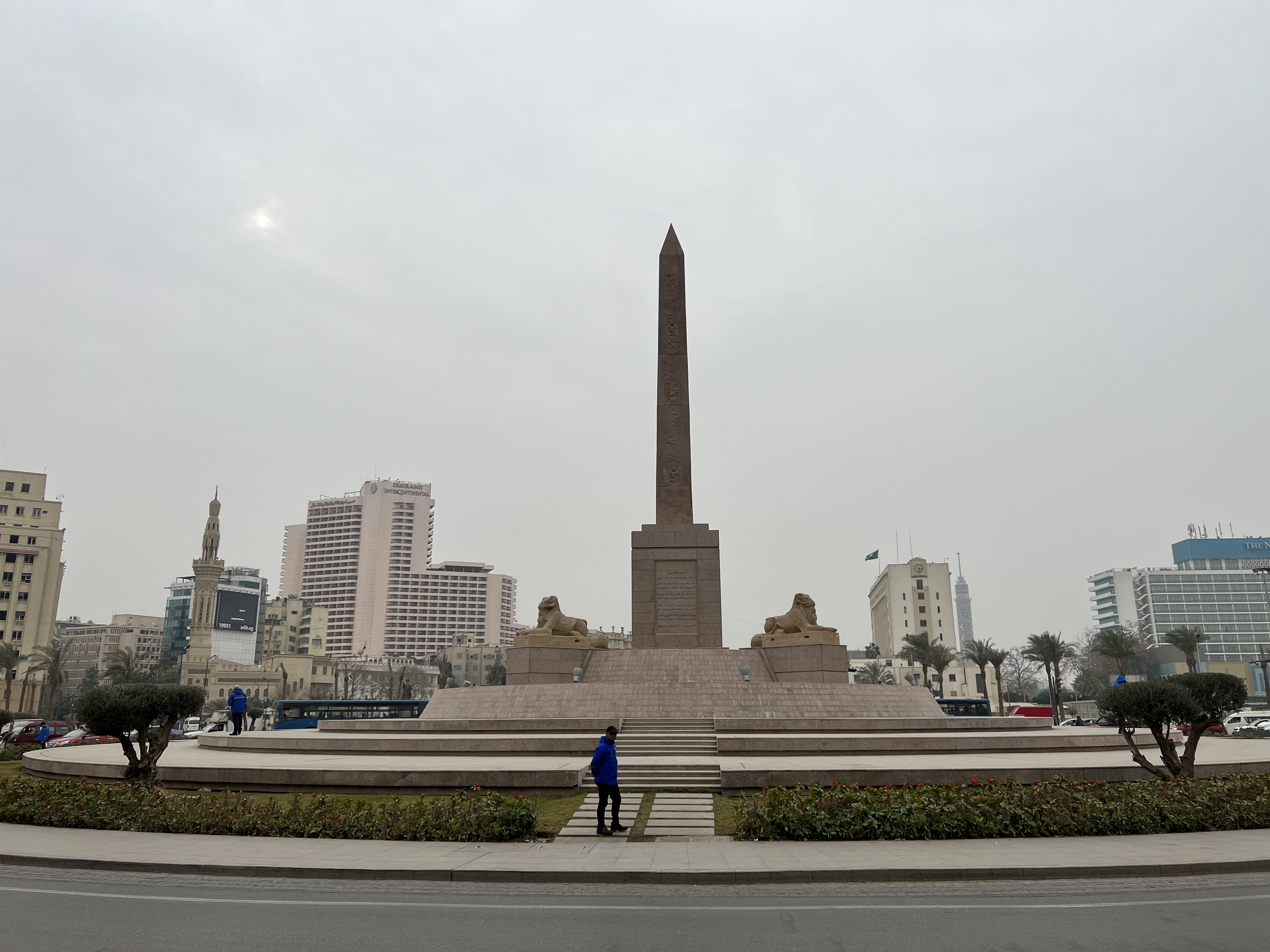
Tahrir Square in Cairo, Egypt

The Egyptian Arabic word for square is Midan, which also means "Place", and is a common term for central squares in Egypt. List of major squares in Egypt, include Cairo's Tahrir Square, in downtown Cairo, Cairo, Egypt, established in 1867.

== Germany ==
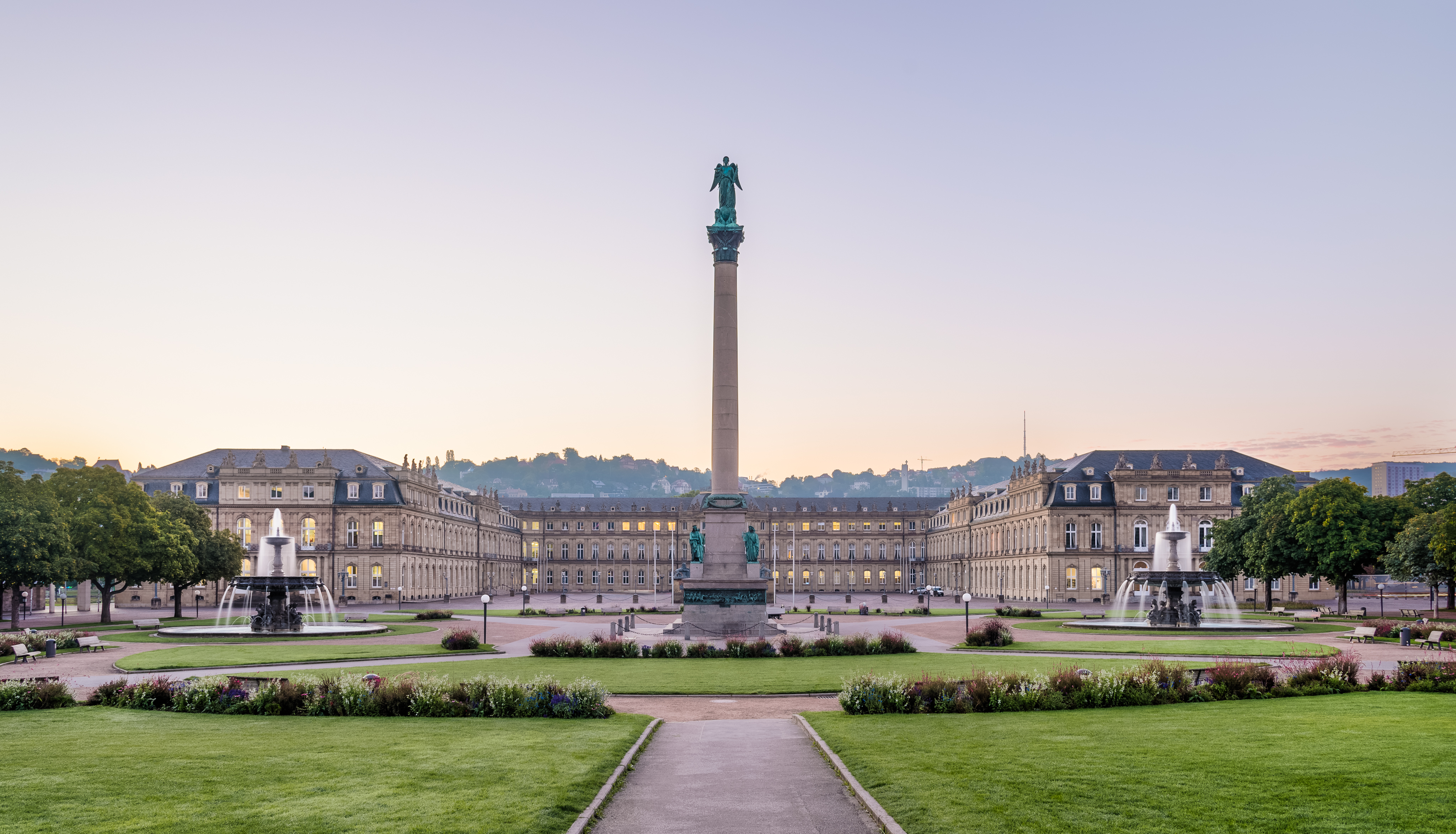
Schlossplatz in Stuttgart, Germany

The German word for square is Platz, which also means "Place", and is a common term for open spaces (not necessarily square) in German-speaking countries. Some of these have been focal points of public life in towns and cities from the Middle Ages to today. Squares located opposite a palace or castle (German: Schloss) are commonly named Schlossplatz. Prominent Plätze include the Alexanderplatz, Pariser Platz and Potsdamer Platz in Berlin, the Heldenplatz in Vienna, and the Königsplatz in Munich.

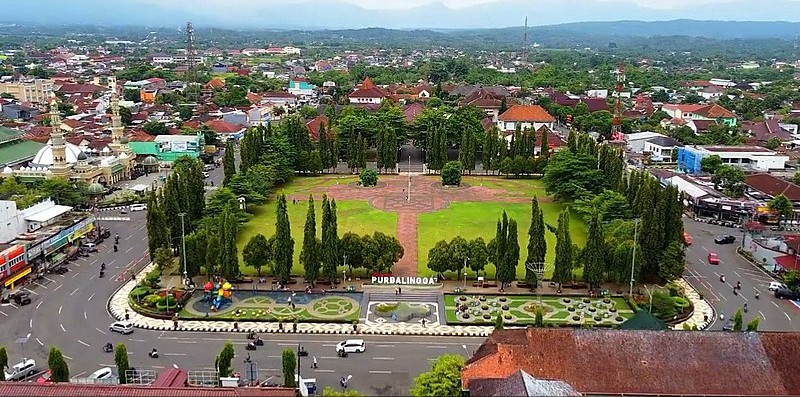
Alun-Alun Purbalingga, Indonesia

== Iran ==
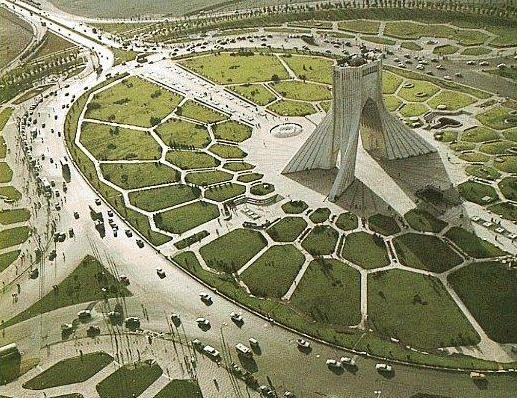
Azadi Square in Tehran, Iran

In traditional Persian architecture, town squares are known as maydan or meydan. A maydan is considered one of the essential features in urban planning and they are often adjacent to bazaars, large mosques and other public buildings. Naqsh-e Jahan Square in Isfahan and Azadi Square in Tehran are examples of classic and modern squares.

== Italy ==
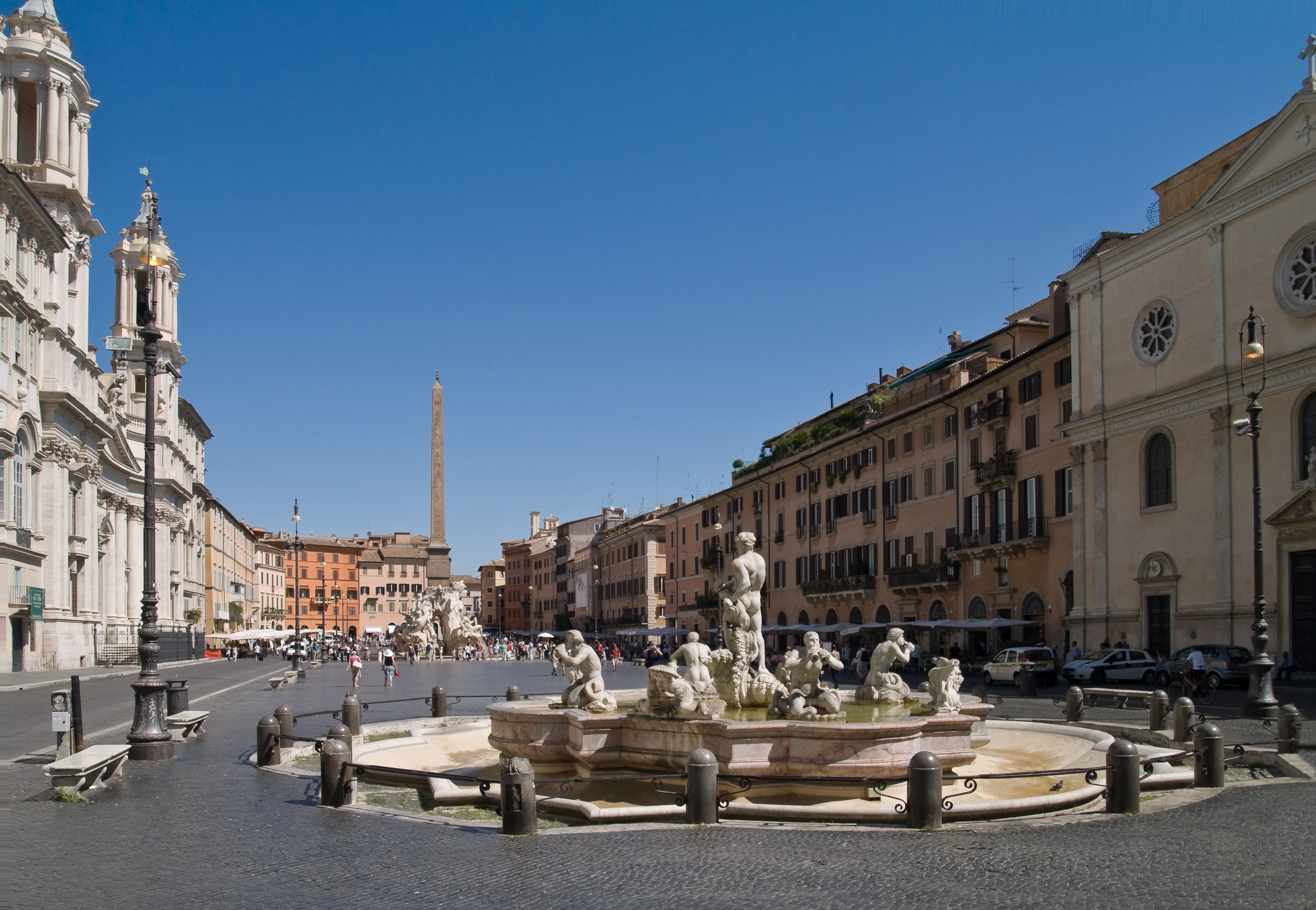
Piazza Navona and the Fontana del Moro in Rome, Italy. The fountain in the foreground is Fontana dei Quattro Fiumi.

A piazza (Italian pronunciation: [ˈpjattsa]) is a city square in Italy, Malta, along the Dalmatian coast and in surrounding regions. Possibly influenced by the centrality of the Roman forum to ancient Mediterranean culture, the piazze of Italy are central to most towns and cities. Shops, businesses, metro stations, and bus stops are commonly found on piazzas, and in multiple locations also feature Roman Catholic churches, such as in places known as the Piazza del Duomo, with the most famous perhaps being the one in Milan, or government buildings, such as the Piazza del Quirinale adjacent to the Quirinal Palace of the Italian president in Rome.

The Piazza San Marco in Venice and Piazza del Popolo in Rome are among the world's best known Italian piazzas. These squares historically played a major role in the political developments of Italy in both the Italian Medieval era and the Italian Renaissance. For example, the Piazza della Signoria in Florence remains synonymous with the return of the Medici from their exile in 1530 as well as the burning at the stake of Savonarola. Naples' main square is Piazza del Plebiscito.

The Italian term is roughly equivalent to the Spanish plaza, French term place, Portuguese praça, and German Platz. The concept should not be confused with an unrelated usage of the term referring to a feature of architectural or urban design, such as the piazza at King's Cross station in London or piazza as a verandah or front porch of a house or apartment in the United States, such as at George Washington's historic home Mount Vernon.

Several countries, especially around the Mediterranean Sea, feature Italian-style town squares. In Gibraltar, one such town square just off Gibraltar's Main Street, between the Parliament Building and the City Hall officially named John Mackintosh Square is referred to as The Piazza.

== Netherlands and Belgium ==
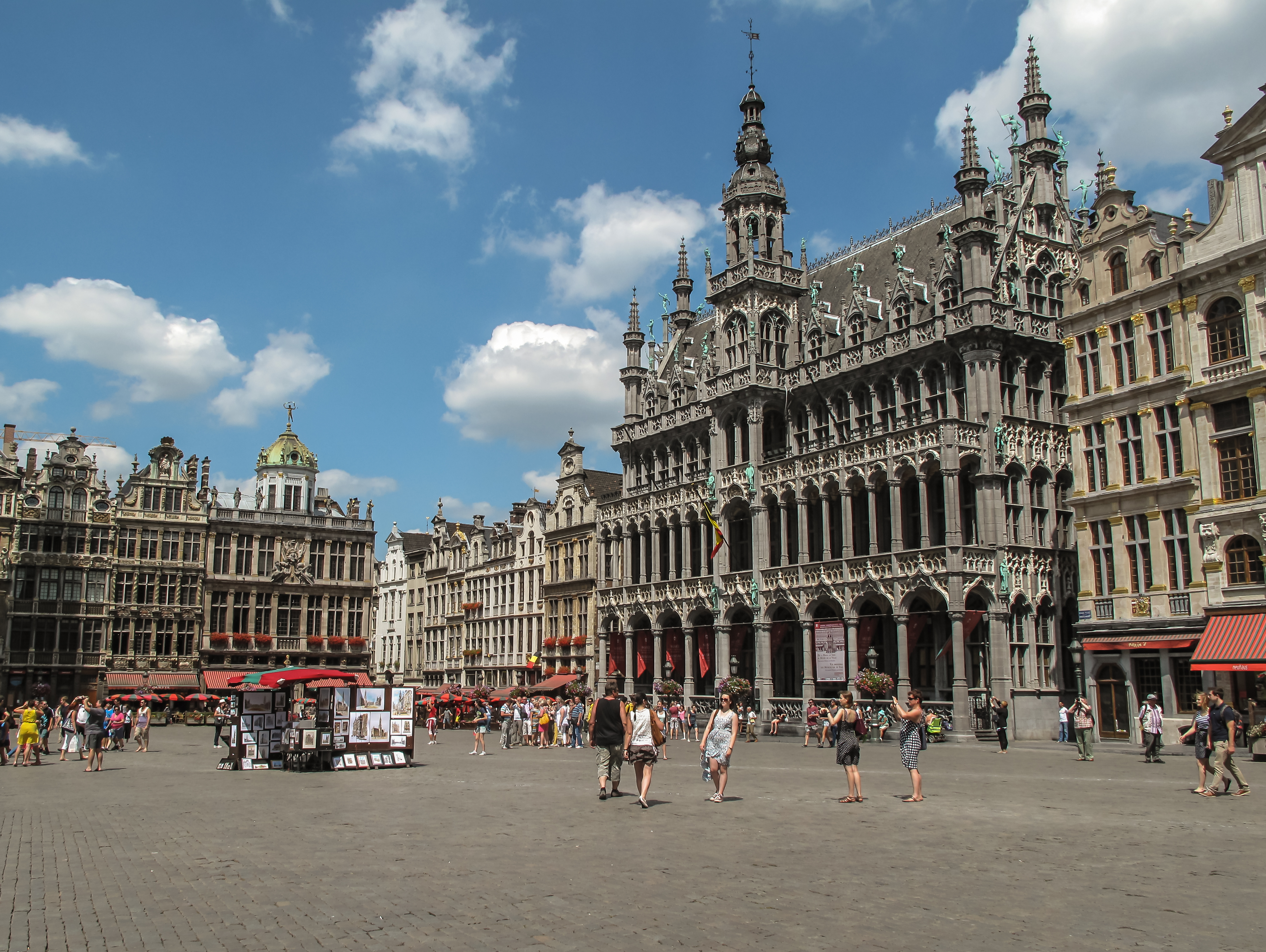
Grand-Place in Brussels, Belgium

In the Low Countries, squares are often called "markets" because of their usage as marketplaces. Most towns and cities in Belgium and the southern part of the Netherlands have in their historical centre a Grote Markt (literally "Big Market") in Dutch or Grand-Place (literally "Grand Square") in French (for example the Grand-Place in Brussels and the Grote Markt in Antwerp). The Grote Markt or Grand-Place is often the location of the town hall, hence also the political centre of the town. The Dutch word for square is plein, which is another common name for squares in Dutch-speaking regions (for example Het Plein in The Hague).

In the 17th and 18th centuries, another type of square emerged, the so-called royal square (French: Place royale, Dutch: Koningsplein). Such squares did not serve as a marketplace but were built in front of large palaces or public buildings to emphasise their grandeur, as well as to accommodate military parades and ceremonies, among others (for example the Place Royale in Brussels and the Koningsplein in Amsterdam). Palace squares are usually more symmetrical than their older market counterparts.

== Russia ==
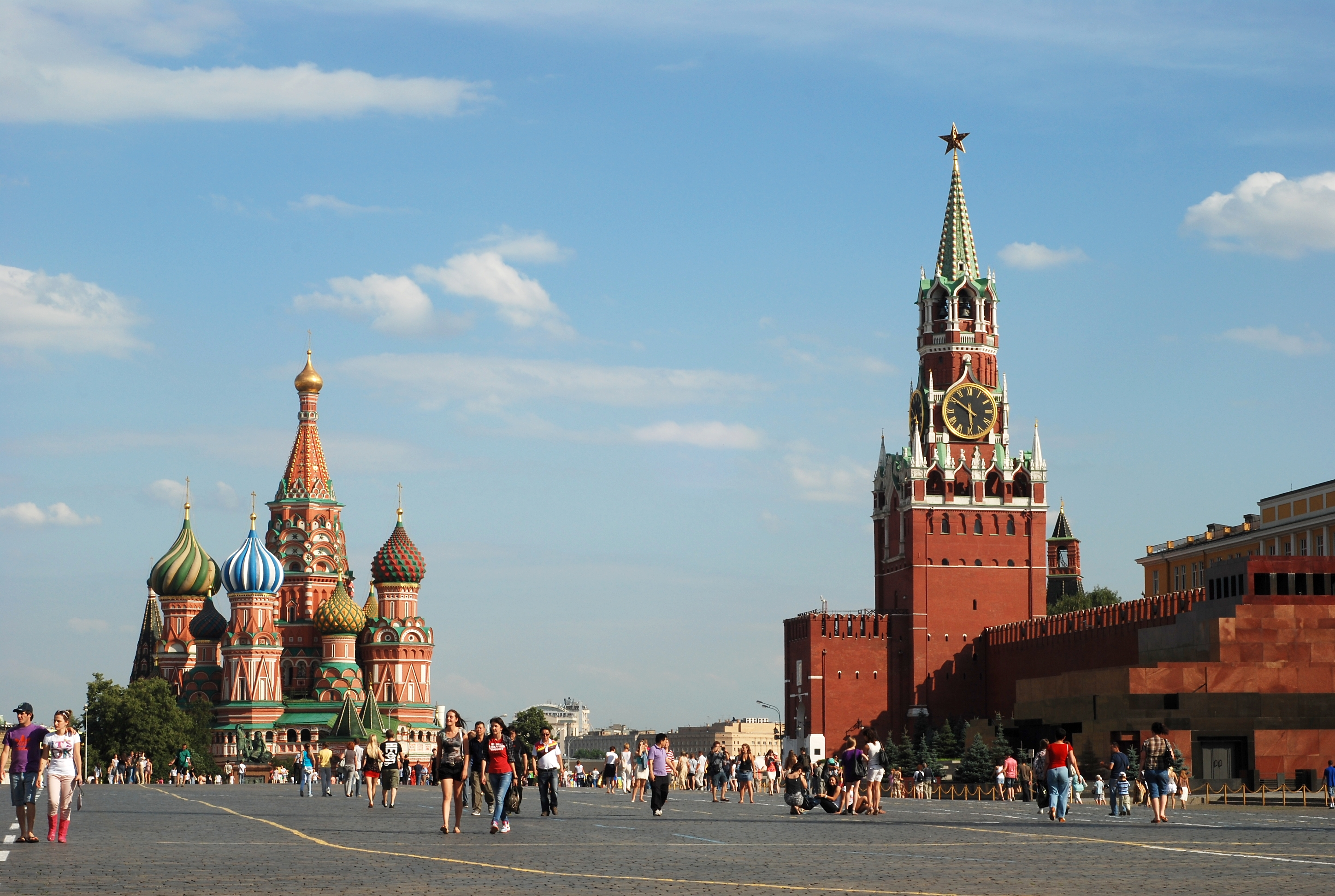
Red Square in Moscow, Russia, a view from the northwest, showing historic St. Basil's Cathedral and the Spasskaya Tower or "Saviour Tower"

In Russia, central square (Russian: центра́льная пло́щадь, romanised: tsentráĺnaya plóshchad́) is a common term for an open area in the heart of the town. In a number of cities, the square has no individual name and is officially designated Central Square, for example Central Square (Tolyatti). The most famous central square is the monumentally-proportioned Red Square which became a synecdoche for the Soviet Union during the 20th century; nevertheless, the association with "red communism" is a back formation, since krásnaja (the term for "red") also means "beautiful" in archaic and poetic Russian, with many cities and towns throughout the region having locations with the name "Red Square."

== South Korea ==
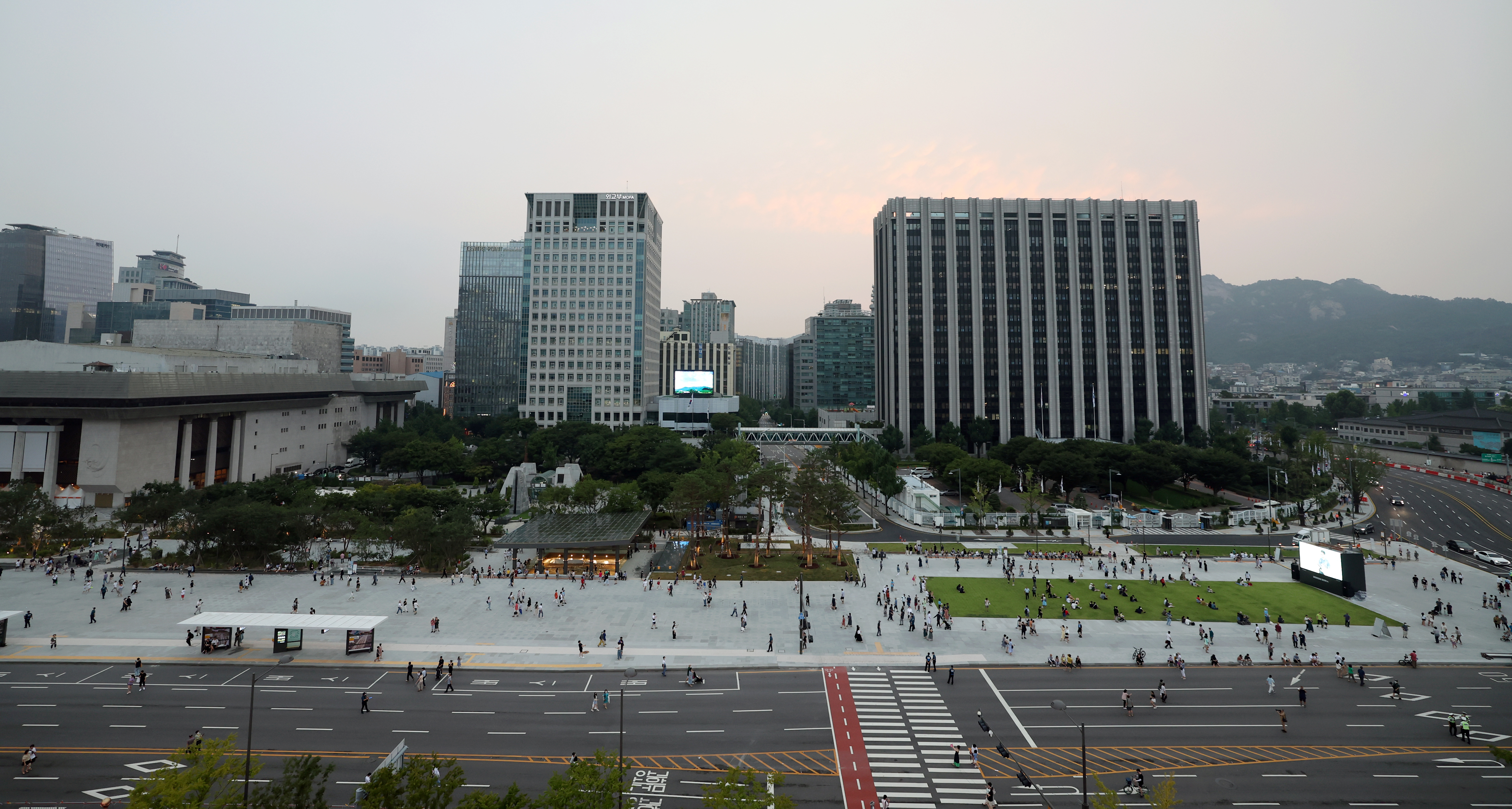
Gwanghwamun Square, Seoul, South Korea

Gwanghwamun Plaza (Korean: 광화문광장) also known as Gwanghwamun Square) is a public open space on Sejongno, Jongno-gu, Seoul, South Korea. It's opposite the background of A Gwanghwamun Gate (Korean: 광화문).

In 2009, Restoration of Gwanghwamun Gate made the gate's front space as a public plaza. The square has been renovated to modern style has new waterways & rest Areas, exhibition Hall for Excavated Cultural Assets in August 2022.

== Spanish-speaking countries and the Philippines ==
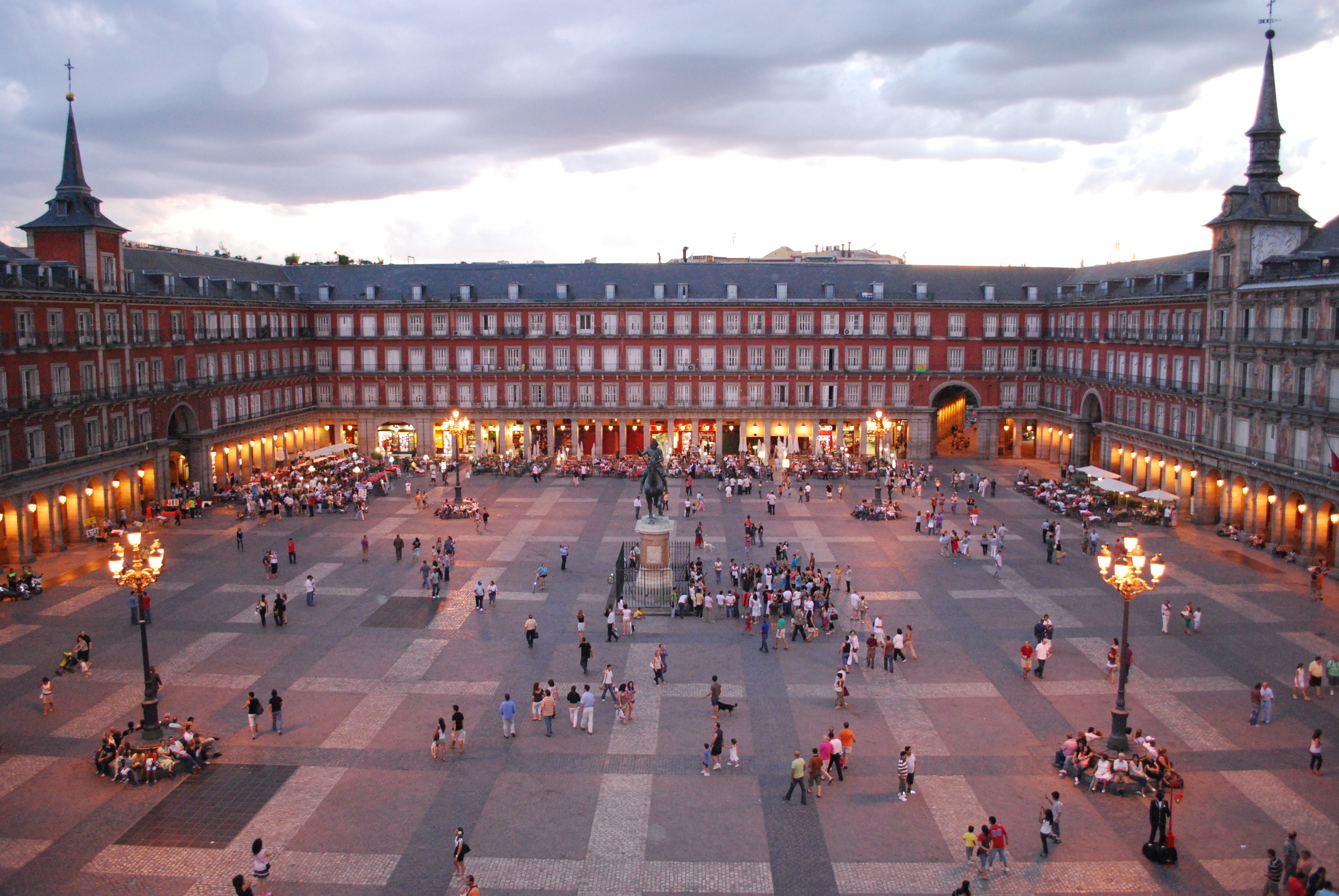
Plaza Mayor, Madrid, Spain

The Spanish-language term for a public square is plaza. (Note: [ˈplasa] or [ˈplaθa] depending on the dialectal variety) The term plaza comes from Latin platea, with the meaning of 'broad street' or 'public square'. Ultimately coming from Greek πλατεῖα (ὁδός) plateia (hodos), it is a cognate of Italian piazza and French place (which has also been borrowed into English). The term is used across the Spanish-speaking world, including Spain, the Americas, and the Philippines.

In addition to smaller plazas, the Plaza Mayor (sometimes called the Plaza de Armas (Note: pl. plazas de armas; literally arms square or place-of-arms (A place where troops could be mustered).) in the Americas) of each administrative centre held three closely related institutions: the cathedral, the cantabile or administrative center, which might be incorporated in a wing of a governor's palace, and the audiencia or law court. The plaza might be large enough to serve as a military parade ground. Diminutives of plaza include plazuela and the latter's double diminutive plazoleta, which can be occasionally used as a particle in a proper noun.

In the former Spanish Empire, most cities constructed by the Spanish conquistadores were designed in a standard military fashion, based on a grid pattern taken from the Roman castrum, of which one block would be left vacant to form the Plaza de Armas. It is often surrounded by governmental buildings, churches, and other structures of cultural or political significance. The name derives from the fact that this would be a refuge in case of an attack upon the city, from which arms would be supplied to the defenders.

Like the Italian piazza and the Portuguese praça, the plaza remains a center of community life that is only equaled by the market-place. A plaza de toros is a bullring. Shopping centers may incorporate 'plaza' into their names, and plaza comercial is used in some countries as a synonym for centro comercial i.e. "shopping center".

== United Kingdom ==
In the United Kingdom, and especially in London and Edinburgh, a "square" has a wider meaning. There are public squares of the type described above, but the term is also used for formal open spaces surrounded by houses with private gardens at the centre, sometimes known as garden squares. Most of these were built in the 18th and 19th centuries. In some cases the gardens are now open to the public. See the Squares in London category. Additionally, many public squares were created in towns and cities across the UK as part of urban redevelopment following the Blitz. Squares can also be quite small and resemble courtyards, especially in the City of London.

== United States ==
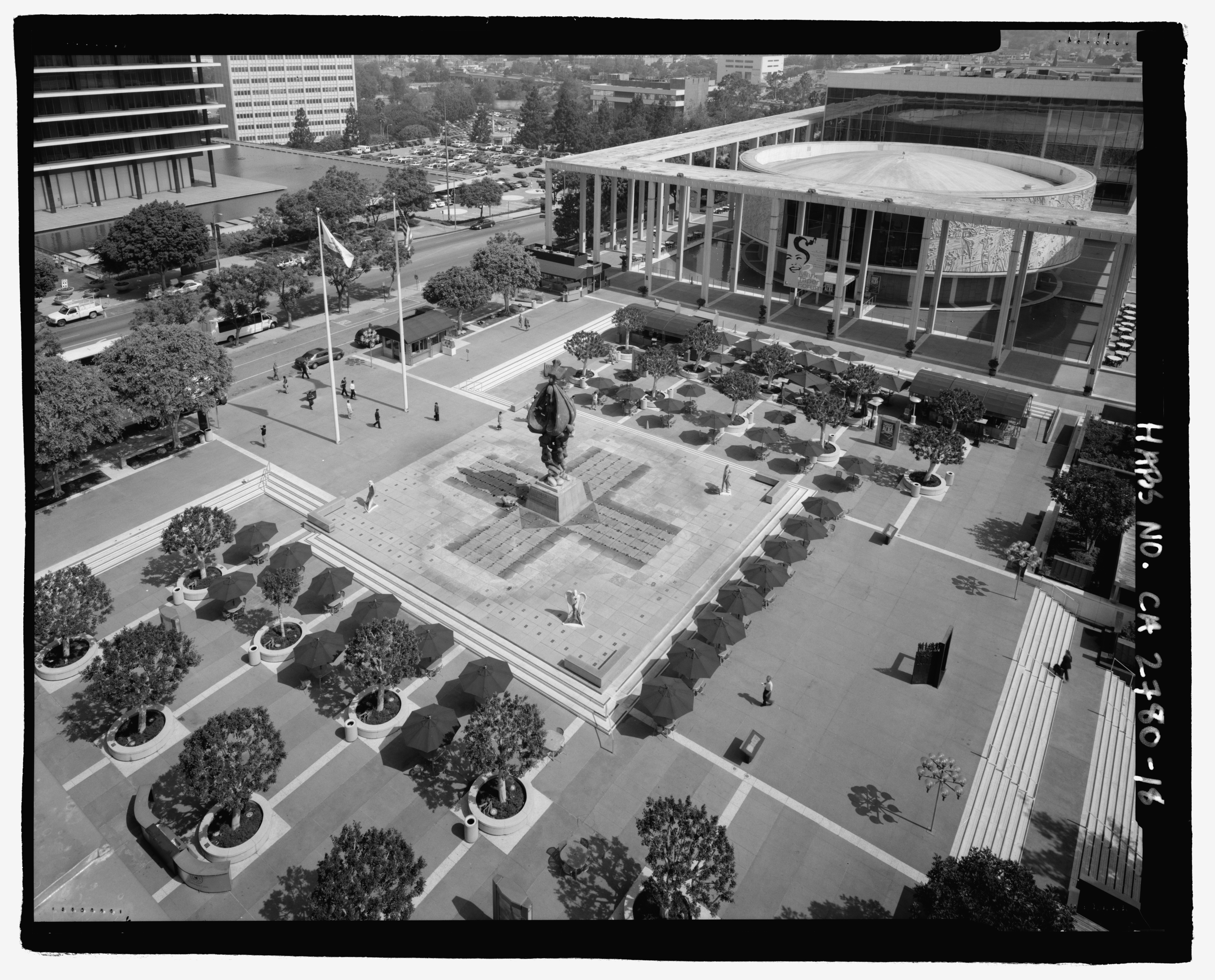
Los Angeles Music Center Plaza

In some cities (in the United States), especially in New England, the term "square" (as its Spanish equivalent, plaza) is applied to a commercial area (like Central Square in Cambridge, Massachusetts), usually formed around the intersection of three or more streets, and which originally consisted of some open area (many of which have been filled in with traffic islands and other traffic calming features). Many of these intersections are irregular rather than square.

The placita (Spanish for "little plaza"), as it is known in the Southwestern United States, is a common feature within the boundaries of the former provincial kingdom of Santa Fe de Nuevo México. They are a blend of Hispano and Pueblo design styles, several of which continue to be hubs for cities and towns in New Mexico, including Santa Fe Plaza, Old Town Albuquerque, Acoma Pueblo's plaza, Taos Downtown Historic District, Mesilla Plaza, Mora, and Las Vegas Plaza.

In U.S. English, a plaza can mean one of several things:

- a town square, as in the Spanish usage
- "any open area usually located near urban buildings and often featuring walkways, trees and shrubs, places to sit, and sometimes shops"
- a shopping center of any size
- a toll plaza, where traffic must temporarily stop to pay tolls
- an area adjacent to an expressway that has service facilities (such as restaurants, gas stations, and restrooms)

Today's metropolitan landscapes often incorporate the plaza as a design element, or as an outcome of zoning regulations, building budgetary constraints, and the like. Sociologist William H. Whyte conducted an extensive study of plazas in New York City: his study humanized the way modern urban plazas are conceptualized, and helped usher in significant design changes in the making of plazas. They can be used to open spaces for low-income neighborhoods, and can also the overall aesthetic of the surrounding area boosting economic vitality, pedestrian mobility and safety for pedestrians. Most plazas are created out of a collaboration between local non-profit applicants and city officials which requires approval from the city.

Throughout North America, words like place, square, or plaza frequently appear in the names of commercial developments such as shopping centers and hotels.

== See also ==
- Cathedral Square
- List of city squares
- List of city squares by size
- Urban vitality
