= Santa Maria della Scala, Siena =

- Council of Siena
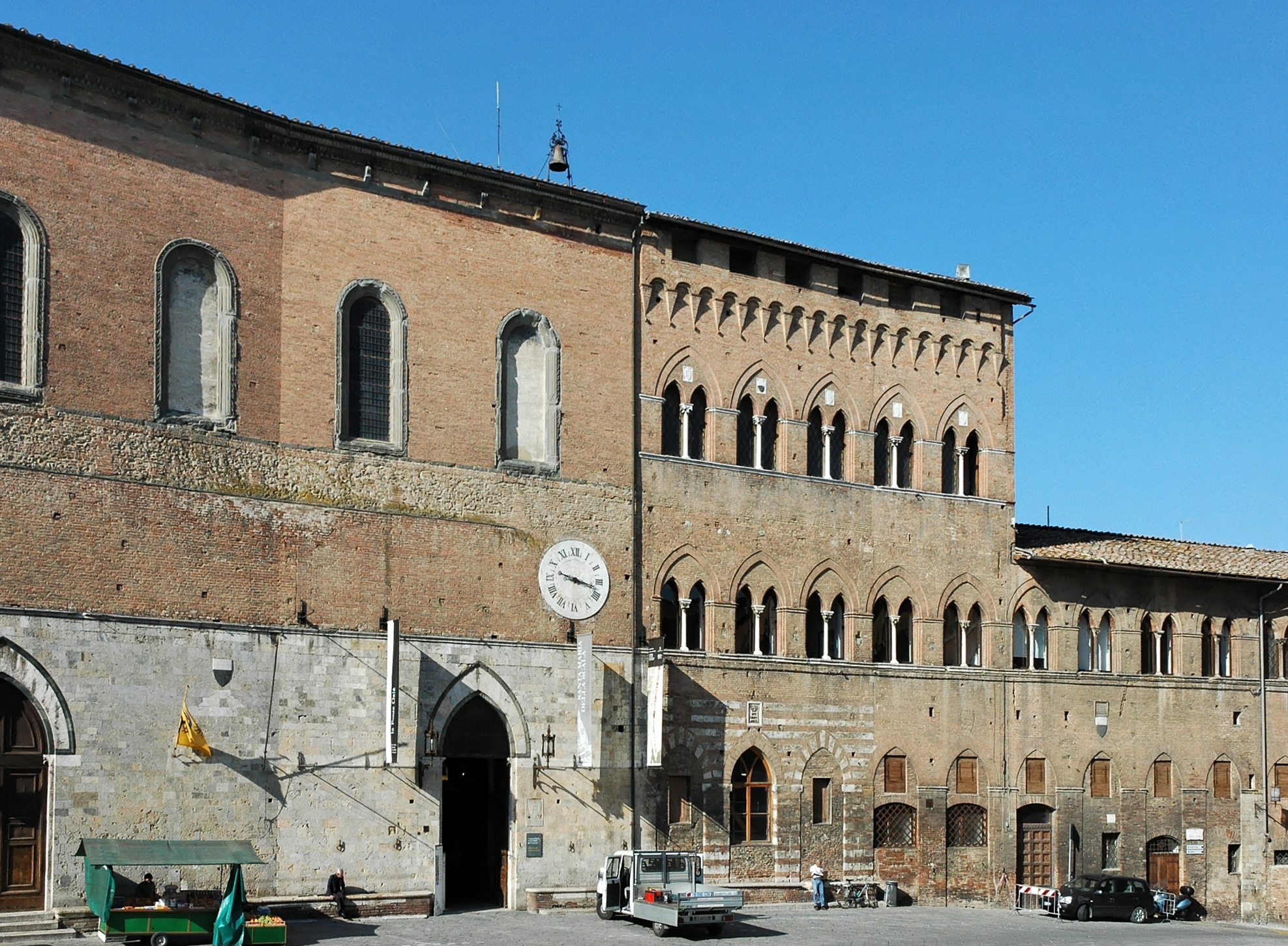
- The entrance of the Hospital

Geography
- Location: Siena, Tuscany, Italy
- Coordinates: 43°19′6.14″N 11°19′42.57″E

Organisation
- Religious affiliation: Roman Catholic
- Affiliated university: University of Siena
- Patron: Catherine of Siena

History
- Opened: March 29, 1090 (possibly as early as 898)
- Closed: 1995

Links
- Website: www.santamariadellascala.com
- Lists: Hospitals in Italy

Santa Maria della Scala (also referred to as the Hospital, Ospedale, and Spedale) is located in Siena, Italy. Now a museum, it was once an important civic hospital dedicated to caring for abandoned children, the poor, the sick, and pilgrims. Revenues were earned partially from bequests and donations from the citizens of Siena, particularly the wealthy. The head of the hospital was the rector who managed the lay brothers responsible for its operation.

Santa Maria della Scala was one of Europe's first hospitals and is one of the oldest hospitals still surviving in the world. It played a major cultural role and is considered one of Siena's 3 main artistic hubs.

== Location ==
The Hospital partially gets its name from its position. Located across the Piazza del Duomo from Siena Cathedral, Santa Maria della Scala refers to its position across from the steps that lead into the Cathedral. The Hospital is made up of a complex of buildings. Those buildings have been enlarged and improved upon over the years, yet the Hospital's properties also once included much of the Via del Capitano and land outside the city walls as well as other, smaller hospitals. Around the 13th and 14th centuries, the Hospital organized its land into large agricultural estates. This is said to have "represented the largest concentration of land of the Sienese state". This agricultural land helped to financially support the Hospital's works.

Particular sections of note include the Church of the Santissima Annuziata, which was built at the end of the 13th century but then completely renovated towards the end of the 15th century, and the Pellegrinaio. The Pellegrinaio (or "Pilgrim's Hall") is the main hall where pilgrims were lodged. It also served as a location for public festivities. This hall, along with another specifically to house women was built around 1325. The church of the Santissima Annuziata, built during the 13th century, was enlarged during the second part of the 15th century, along with the "vertical expansion" of the Palazzo del Rettore.

== Philanthropic mission ==
Santa Maria della Scala was dedicated to its services. From at least as far back as 1193 up to the 18th century, the Hospital took on many philanthropic endeavors:

Abandoned babies often found their way to the Hospital. Meticulous records were kept of the details relating to each child, in order that the original parents may later be able to find them. The procedure for the children's care was implemented according to age: As infants, they were given to wet nurses then later weaned and educated. At age 8, they were taught a trade and any profits they made were kept for them. When they reached 18, the children had the option of leaving. Those that chose to leave were given all their saved earnings, plus 100 soldi, a set of clothing, and furnishings for a house. Girls were given an additional 50 lire as a dowry.

Meals were served for the poor three times a week. The sick were also given free meals and treatment. The Hospital's treatment of the sick was unusual for the time: their policy was to have one bed for each sick patient, and the sheets were kept clean. Also, in what has been suggested as "one of the earliest examples of such a therapeutic objective," patients were treated in order to be cured. The Hospital employed one normal doctor and one surgeon. In the 16th century, it added an additional surgeon. As the Hospital became a training ground for doctors, there was, for the 17th and 18th centuries, a unique emphasis on using a more hands-on learning approach.

Another service implemented by the Hospital was to care for pilgrims. They were offered free room and board in the pilgrimage halls, which were segregated by sex. When they left, pilgrims received vouchers for food and drink in Sienese territory as they continued their travels.

== History ==
Siena lies on the Via Francigena, the main pilgrimage road to Rome, and the Hospital was probably founded to accommodate the pilgrims and other travelers who passed through by the canons of the Duomo. According to legend, the Hospital was founded in 898 by a cobbler named Sorore. However, the first known document mentioning it is a "deed of gift" from March 29, 1090. The first rector, Beringerio, was said to be appointed in 1200.

To settle infighting between the clergy and laypeople over who held more authority, Pope Celestine III issued a papal bull in 1193 that declared the Hospital a lay organization independent of the Cathedral.

In 1359, the Hospital acquired several new relics, including part of the Virgin Mary's girdle and her veil, possibly to stimulate pilgrim travel. More relics were acquired under the Rector Giovanni Buzzichelli. Other relics owned by the Hospital included those of Sts Augustinus and Marcellinus, and a nail from the cross of Christ.

At the end of the 13th century, the Hospital sped up its physical expansion and internally began splitting up according to the different functions it held (such as headquarters for confraternities, caring for the sick, sheltering pilgrims, etc.).

In 1404 the Council of Siena took control of the rector nomination process and made it a city office.

In the 1430s, the confraternity devoted to Saint Jerome moved into the rooms in the lower levels of the Hospital, which were directly accessible from the streets. Other confraternities active at this time include an older confraternity dedicated to Mary Most Holy, the brotherhood of Saint Michael the Archangel, later renamed the brotherhood of Saint Catherine of the Night, and a confraternity founded by Andrea Gallerani that was "active in good works" at the Hospital.

During the 18th century, the Hospital became part of the university.

In 1995, the Hospital opened up to the public as a museum. At first, only the areas considered the most significant were shown. As more areas were restored, access increased. It is still being restored.

== Art ==
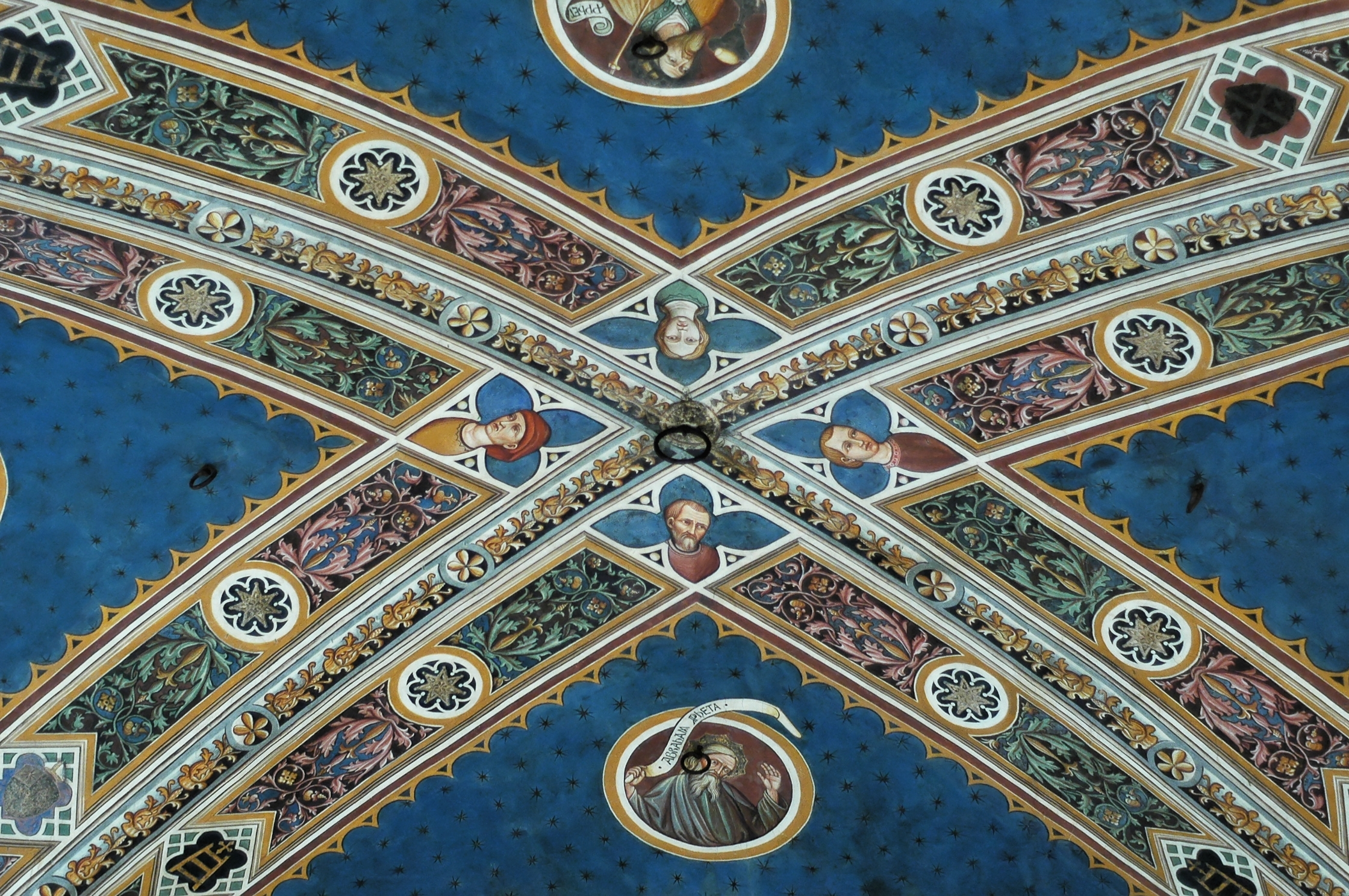
Frescoes in the Pilgrim's Hall by Domenico di Bartolo

In the 1330s Santa Maria della Scala commissioned many important interior and exterior frescoes as well as several significant, later altar pieces such as Beccafumi's Trinity Triptych of 1513. The exterior frescoes commissioned for the Ospedale (Santa Maria della Scala) no longer exist. Due to well-kept documents, the artists who created these magnificent frescos can be identified as Simone Martini and the Lorenzetti brothers, Pietro and Ambrogio.

The interior artwork of Santa Maria della Scala, however, has survived through the centuries. The majority of these pieces were altar pieces that were created after The Black Death. Several artists during the 1370s to 1390's created these paintings. The principal artist of the altarpieces was Bartolommeo Bulgarini. His two latest surviving paintings were a Madonna and an Assumption of the Virgin. The Assumption of the Virgin, commissioned in 1339, was the largest and most extravagant work for the Ospedale altar containing the relic of the Virgin's girdle.

== Frescos ==
The church has a series of frescoes depicting the Life of the Virgin (1398):

- Birth of the Virgin by Pietro Lorenzetti
- Presentation in the Temple by Ambrogio Lorenzetti
- Betrothal of the Virgin by Simone Martini
- Return of the Virgin to her Parents' House also by Martini.

These scenes where chosen to not only honor Mary, but to give recognition to her parents, Saints Joachim and Anne, the subjects of the special devotion at the Hospital during the 1320s and 1330s. These scenes are among the first known works depicting the early life of the Virgin, and, like Giotto's fresco of this subject in the Arena Chapel in Padua (completed 1305), became a valuable model for iconography.

Due to records, it is known both Pietro and Ambrogio signed and dated the works on the façade of Santa Maria della Scala in 1335. Simone Martini and the Lorenzetti brothers were among the most talented painters in Sienese art during this time, and led large studios. Research suggests that Amborgio Lorenzetti designed all four of the episodes on the façade of Ospedale. Both he and his brother, Pietro, worked collaboratively on the frescos. However, two of these designs, the Bethrothal and Return, were completed by Simone Martinti. These frescoes no longer exist and were most likely destroyed in the early 18th century.

What is known or speculated about these frescoes comes from archival sources and a predella painted by Sano di Pietro. Commissioned in 1448 for the Capella dei Signore in the Palazzo Publico, Sano di Pietro's panel contains the same scenes as those painted in the facade for the Ospedale. It is believed that the scenes in this altarpiece are identical to the ones painted by Simone Martini.

== Altarpieces ==
The altarpieces that adorned the interior of Santa Maria della Scala also centered on the life of the Virgin Mary. The main painter of these altarpieces was Bartolommeo Bulgarini whose family connections were instrumental in his selection for this commission. Other artists who lacked family connections to the Osepdale were also hired by the institution and its members to add to its decoration. Bulgarini, however, was awarded commission for five of the main altarpieces.

Virgin of the Assumption with St Thomas Receiving the Girdle

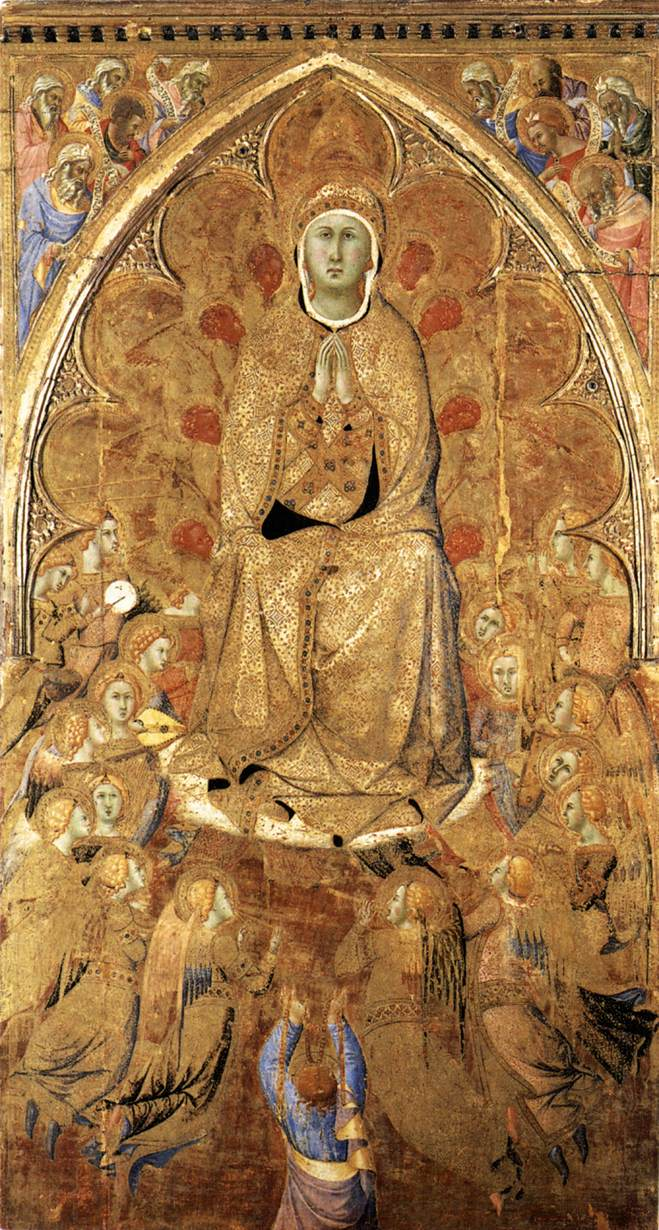
Virgin of the Assumption with St Thomas Receiving the Girdle, by Bulgarini now at Pinacoteca Nazionale of Siena

This was one of the largest and most extravagant works completed for the hospital, commissioned for the altar containing the relic of the Virgin's girdle, or belt, a relic which had been obtained by the hospital in 1359. Based on historical and stylistic evidence, the painting was completed in 1360.
The panel depicts the Virgin seated on a bank of clouds with her hands in prayer, looking straight ahead. She is dressed in sgraffitoed garments that are edged with punch work bands, lined with a bright blue. Above the Virgin is a gothic arch. The top of the arch rests against the border creating two corner pockets. In each pocket are a group of prophets. The prophets have some color to them, but are mostly encased by gold. Behind the Virgin are nine red-faced baby angels that encompass the floating figure of the Virgin. A plethora of angels playing musical instruments and singing hymns are placed in the outer ring of figures. At the bottom center, the small figure of St Thomas, dressed in a blue, purple, and gold robe is wedged between the angels. He faces up toward the Virgin and reaches to catch the girdle that the Virgin loosens as sign of her physical ascent into heaven. Much of the color palette of this painting is made up of gold leaf.

The Reliquary Shutters of Andrea Gallerani
Completed by an anonymous artist, this altarpiece portrays the banker and aristocratic Gallerani. The outer shutters of the altarpiece depict Gallerani, with rosary in hand, welcoming four pilgrims. The buildings behind them most likely represent the hospital of Santa Maria Della Scala where Gallerani founded a brotherhood of charitable non-clergymen. The facial features of the subjects on the outer shutters of the altarpiece are representational of those of a new iconography in painting of this style. Behind the shutters, inside the altar piece, Gallerani is pictured again. In this painting he is kneeling in the act of frequent prayer within the hospital. Tied to a beam suspended in midair above a gabled building roof is a noose that hangs down and is then tied around Gallerani's neck. The position of the figure suggests that if he nods off, he will be hung.

Birth of the Virgin

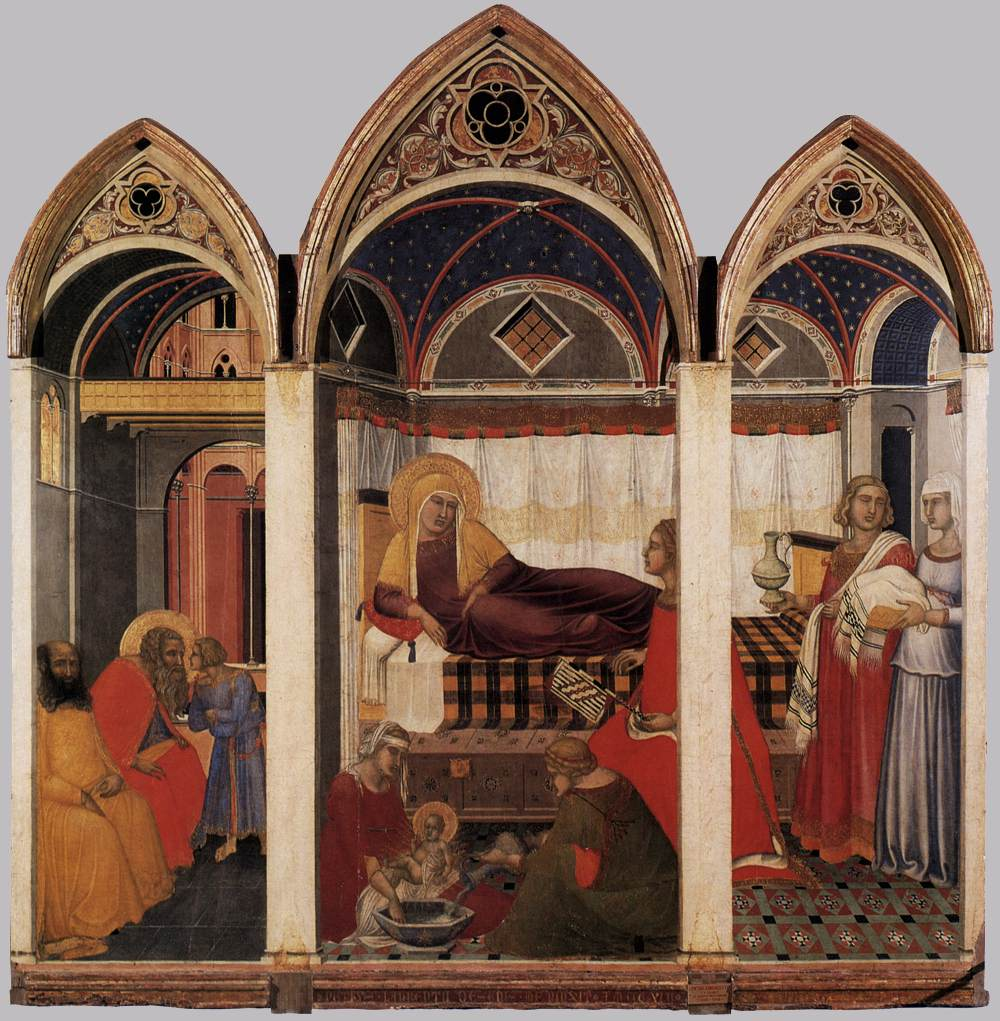
Birth of the Virgin tryptich by Lorenzetti

This triptych by Pietro Lorenzetti was completed seven years after the same scene that was portrayed on the façade of Santa Maria della Scala. The work was placed originally in the main body of the church where it would be seen by many pilgrims. While typically a triptych displays three different scenes, this is a single scene separated by painted or carved wooden columns. The cut of the triptych reflects the shape of the vaulted ceiling where it is placed, creating a three-dimensional illusion of depth. The first section of this triptych features aged Joachim, the Virgin's father, in a separate room sitting next to a friend as he receives the news of the birth of the Virgin from a young boy. The second section depicts St Anne, who has recently given birth to the Virgin Mary, lying in a bed as servants cleanse the infant. In the third section, St Anne's hand maidens stand at the foot of her bed with fresh water and clean linens. The rooms in which the figures are placed possess a gothic quality. The placement and simplistic features of the figures in this composition follow the elements of Byzantine art.

Purification of the Virgin
The subeject of this altarpiece is sometimes confused with the Presentation of Jesus in the Temple. Its original location is believed to have been the hospital church. The emphasis on the central figures of the Virgin's elderly mother, Anne and the aged Simeon, is in keeping with the hospital's function to partly care for the old and infirm.
Ambrogio's attention to detail is quite prominent in this piece. The women figures are dressed in brown, red and orange robes. Some of them also wear white scarves or gold earrings. The use of red, green, pink, and grey in the clothing highlight the gothic architecture. The focal point in this work is quite apparent since all figures eyes are focused on the infant figure of Christ. However, a dominant figure in this altarpiece is the 84-year-old prophetess Anne who stands next to an aged figure of Simone. Simone holds the baby Jesus who is sucking his thumb.
The altarpieces of the hospital church of Santa Maria della Scala are just as important as those works that were portrayed on the façade of the building.

== Museum ==
The museum is open almost every day of the year. An entrance fee is required with reduced prices for large groups, students, seniors, and soldiers. Residents, children under 11 and invalids receive free entrance.

Through the museum, it is possible to view over half of the complex. There are nearly 12,000 square meters of paths covering the renovated parts of the Hospital. Some of the places of interest a museum-goer today can explore are the Pellegrinaio, the Cappella del Manto (Chapel of the Mantle), the Sagrestia Vecchia (Old Sacristy), the Cappella della Madonna (Chapel of the Virgin Mary), and the Oratories of the Compagnia di Santa Caterina della Notte and of Santa Maria sotto le colte. The ravaged sculptures by Jacopo della Quercia from the Fonte Gaia are displayed here, as well as drawings and models for the 1858 restoration. A video animation charts the various states of the fountain through the centuries. Also included are an Archaeological Museum with a vast display of Etruscan cinerary urns and other material, a Children's Art Museum, the Giuliano Briganti Library and Photo Library of Art, and other temporary installation and convention spaces.

== See also ==
- History of hospitals
- Medieval medicine of Western Europe#Hospital system
