= Plaza Hotel (Las Vegas, New Mexico) =

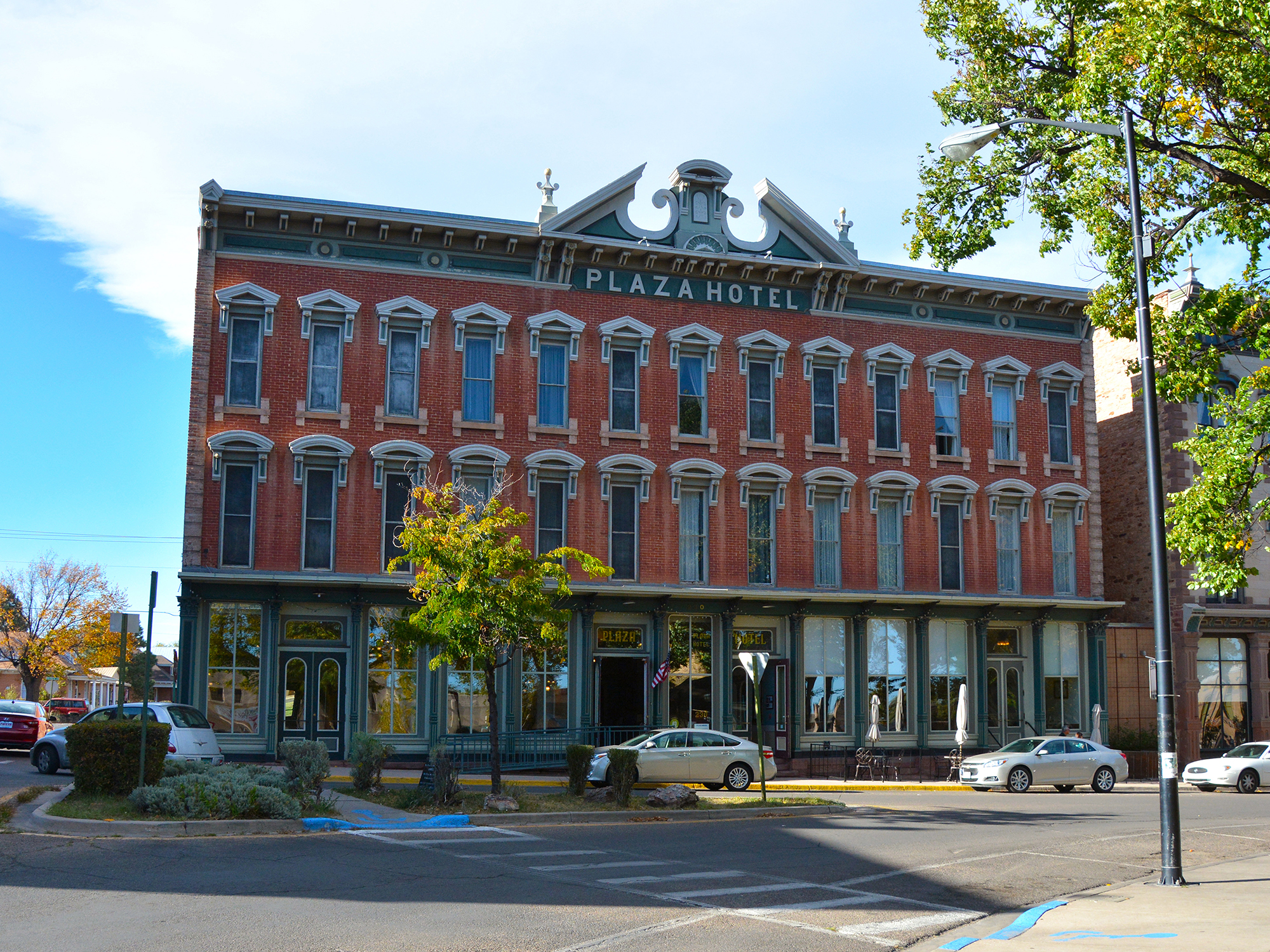

- Location within New Mexico

General information
- Type: Hotel
- Location: Las Vegas, New Mexico, United States
- Coordinates: 35.593003°N 105.227600°W
- Completed: 1882

Website
- plazahotellvnm.com

References
- Plaza Hotel
- U.S. Historic district – Contributing property
- Part of: Las Vegas Plaza (ID74001202)
- MPS: Las Vegas New Mexico MRA (AD)
- Designated CP: December 16, 1974

The Plaza Hotel is a hotel in Las Vegas, New Mexico. It was opened as an upmarket hotel for the booming town in 1882. Since then it has had a complex history. It is listed in the National Register of Historic Places as a contributing property in the Las Vegas Plaza historic district.

== Location ==
The Plaza Hotel is on the north side of the old town plaza in Las Vegas, originally an area where wagons were parked. The town was founded in the 1830s. During the Mexican–American War, in 1846 Stephen W. Kearny gave a speech on the plaza where he proclaimed that New Mexico was part of the United States. The town remained relatively small and quiet for many years. This changed when the Atchison, Topeka and Santa Fe Railway reached the town in 1879, with a station 1 mile (1.6 km) to the east of the plaza. In 1880, after a campaign by the local newspaper, The Las Vegas Optic, a public subscription was raised to convert the plaza into a park. Trees were planted, a bandstand was built and the plaza surrounded by a picket fence.

== Construction ==
By 1882 the town's population had grown to six thousand. The Plaza Hotel was built that year by a group of businessmen led by Don Benigno Romero. The local merchant Carlos Blanchard was among the partners. Construction cost $25,000. The Plaza is a three-story brick building with an Italianate facade. The hotel was grandly decorated, with high-ceilinged guest rooms. The lobby was connected to the second floor by towering twin staircases. The first floor balcony had ornate iron railings, since removed. It was advertised as the finest hotel in the territory. The Plaza was often called the "Belle of the Southwest".

== History ==
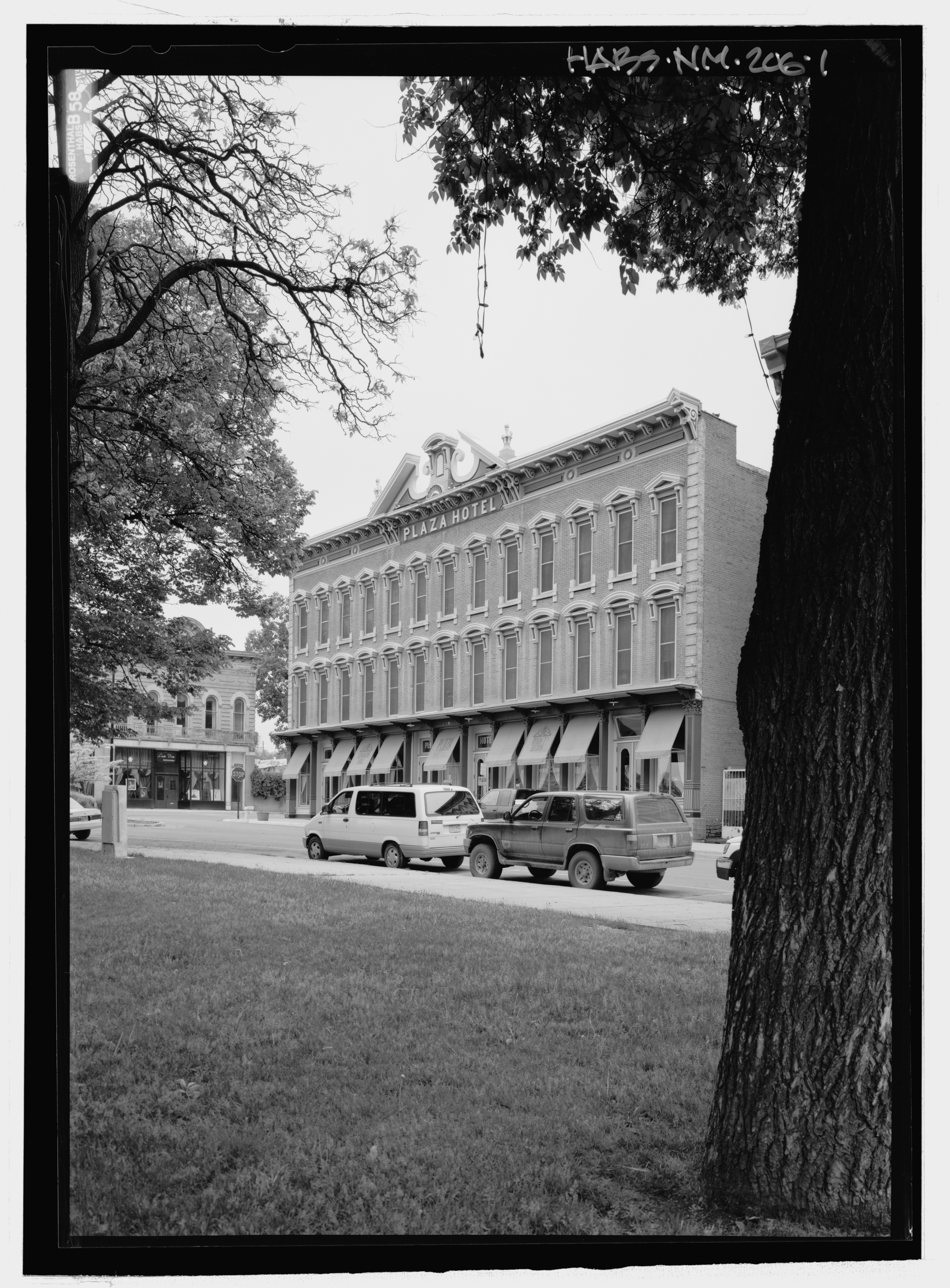
View from the park

In 1883 Charles Ilfeld opened his Great Emporium, a three-story department store, next door to the hotel. The plaza was the commercial center of the region for the next thirty years. In 1885 the former outlaw Dick Liddil (1852–1901) sold his saloon in West Las Vegas and leased the Plaza Hotel's bar and billiard room. The Plaza was the leading hotel in Las Vegas until the late 1890s, when Santa Fe Railroad built the luxurious La Castañeda, which was operated by Fred Harvey as part of the Harvey House chain. By the end of the 1890s Las Vegas rivaled Denver, El Paso and Tucson in importance.

The dry climate of Las Vegas began to attract invalids suffering from pulmonary ailments, particularly tuberculosis, for which no other cure was known. By the 1890s many of the guests at the Plaza were convalescent victims of tuberculosis. The One Lung Club was organized at the hotel in the 1890s to provide social activities for the invalids that did not require exertion. The first reunion of Theodore Roosevelt’s Rough Riders was held at the Plaza Hotel in 1899. Roosevelt stayed at the hotel twice, and announced his presidential candidacy from Las Vegas.

The hotel was used in many cowboy films, including Tom Mix westerns. From 1913 to 1915 the silent film director and actor Romaine Fielding leased the entire hotel, and renamed it the Hotel Romaine. It is still possible to see traces of that name on the brick facade. The first film than Fielding made in Las Vegas was The Rattlesnake, a story about two rivals in love. Four more shorts were made within the next month. His five-reel thriller The Golden God employed about 5,000 local extras and featured a cavalry and artillery charge through the streets of the old town. The print for the film was lost in a fire, and there are no surviving copies.

Mrs. Lucy Lopez, known as Mama Lucy to her friends, ran the Plaza Hotel Restaurant and Bar for fourteen years with her husband. They rented part of the hotel as a dormitory for New Mexico Highlands University students and sold meal tickets for the restaurant as an alternative to the university cafeteria. Daily lunch and dinner cost $30 a month. Students who were short of money could make a special arrangement in exchange for helping out. (Note: The term "Mama Lucy Gang" was used for a group of progressive state legislators of the 1970s who worked to reduce poverty and inequality, protect civil liberty and preserve the environment of New Mexico. Some of the lawmakers had eaten at the Plaza while studying at Highlands University, and had learned from Mama Lucy's compassionate example.)

== Recent years ==
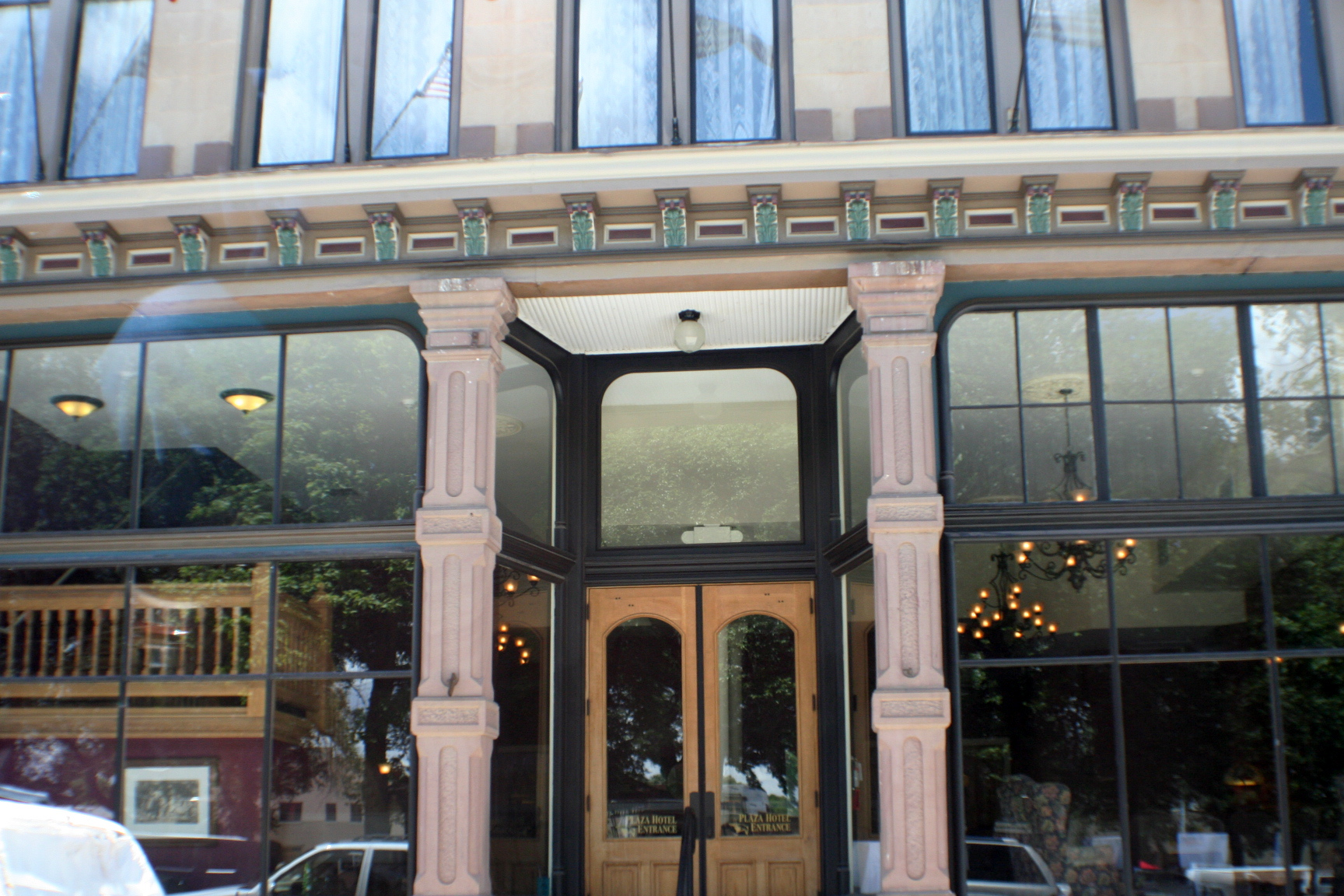
Plaza Hotel entrance

In 1982 the hotel was restored by new owners, giving thirty six guest rooms and a fine dining room. The adjoining building was purchased later, adding another thirty five rooms and 3,100 square feet (290 m^{2}) of space for meetings and banquets. The rooms in the new Ilfeld section are more modern than in the older part of the hotel which holds its comfy luster. In 2006 the hotel had a restaurant and a lobby bar named Byron T's after the former owner Byron T. Mills, whose ghost is said to haunt the building. Several scenes of the 2007 film No Country for Old Men feature the Plaza Hotel.

In March 2014 it was reported that the entrepreneur Allan Affeldt was investigating purchase of the hotel from the Valley National Bank in Española, which held an outstanding $3.7 million note on the property. Affeldt was also looking at buying and restoring its former rival, the vacant Castañeda Hotel.

The Plaza Hotel is registered on the National Register of Historic Places.

Notes

Citations

Sources

- Arreola, Daniel (November 1, 2004). Hispanic Spaces, Latino Places: Community and Cultural Diversity in Contemporary America. University of Texas Press. ISBN 978-0-292-70562-3.
- Barker, Mitch (October 28, 2013). Las Vegas. Arcadia Publishing. ISBN 978-1-4671-3066-0.
- Fugate, Francis L.; Fugate, Roberta B. (1989). Roadside history of New Mexico. Mountain Press Pub. Co. ISBN 978-0-87842-242-5.
- Harris, Richard K. (November 1, 2006). New Mexico. Globe Pequot Press. ISBN 978-0-7627-4205-9.
- King, Lesley S. (March 31, 2011). Frommer's New Mexico. John Wiley & Sons. ISBN 978-1-118-00777-8.
- Martinez, Ken (2009). "Common Geographies". Moving Beyond Borders: Julian Samora and the Establishment of Latino Studies. University of Illinois Press. ISBN 978-0-252-07656-5.
- "New Mexico History / Plaza Hotel". Trips into History. July 23, 2012.
- Nott, Robert (March 1, 2014). "Entrepreneur looks to revamp historic Las Vegas, N.M., hotels, usher in revival". The Santa Fe New Mexican.
- "Old Town in Las Vegas, New Mexico". Colorado Magazine.
- Pattie, Jane; Kelly, Tom (October 7, 2008). Cowboy Spur Maker: The Story of Ed Blanchard. Texas A&M University Press. ISBN 978-1-60344-050-9.
- Perrigo, Lynn Irwin (2010). Gateway to Glorieta: A History of Las Vegas, New Mexico. Sunstone Press. ISBN 978-0-86534-785-4.
- "Plaza Hotel & Restaurant". Historic Hotels of the Rockies.
- Price, V.B. (December 9, 2013). "Mark Douglas Acuff – 1940 -1994". New Mexico Mercury.
- Simpson, Dorothy Audrey (2008). Audrey of the Mountains: The Story of a Twentieth Century Pioneer Woman. Sunstone Press. ISBN 978-0-86534-688-8.
- Storey, Bob (April 15, 1973). "The woman behind 'Mama Lucy'". Santa Fe New Mexican. Santa Fe, New Mexico.
- Yeatman, Ted P. (February 1, 2003). Frank and Jesse James: The Story Behind the Legend. Sourcebooks, Incorporated. ISBN 978-1-58182-325-7.
