= Adele Ilfeld Auditorium =

Historic building in New Mexico, U.S.

- Ilfeld, Adele, Auditorium
- U.S. National Register of Historic Places
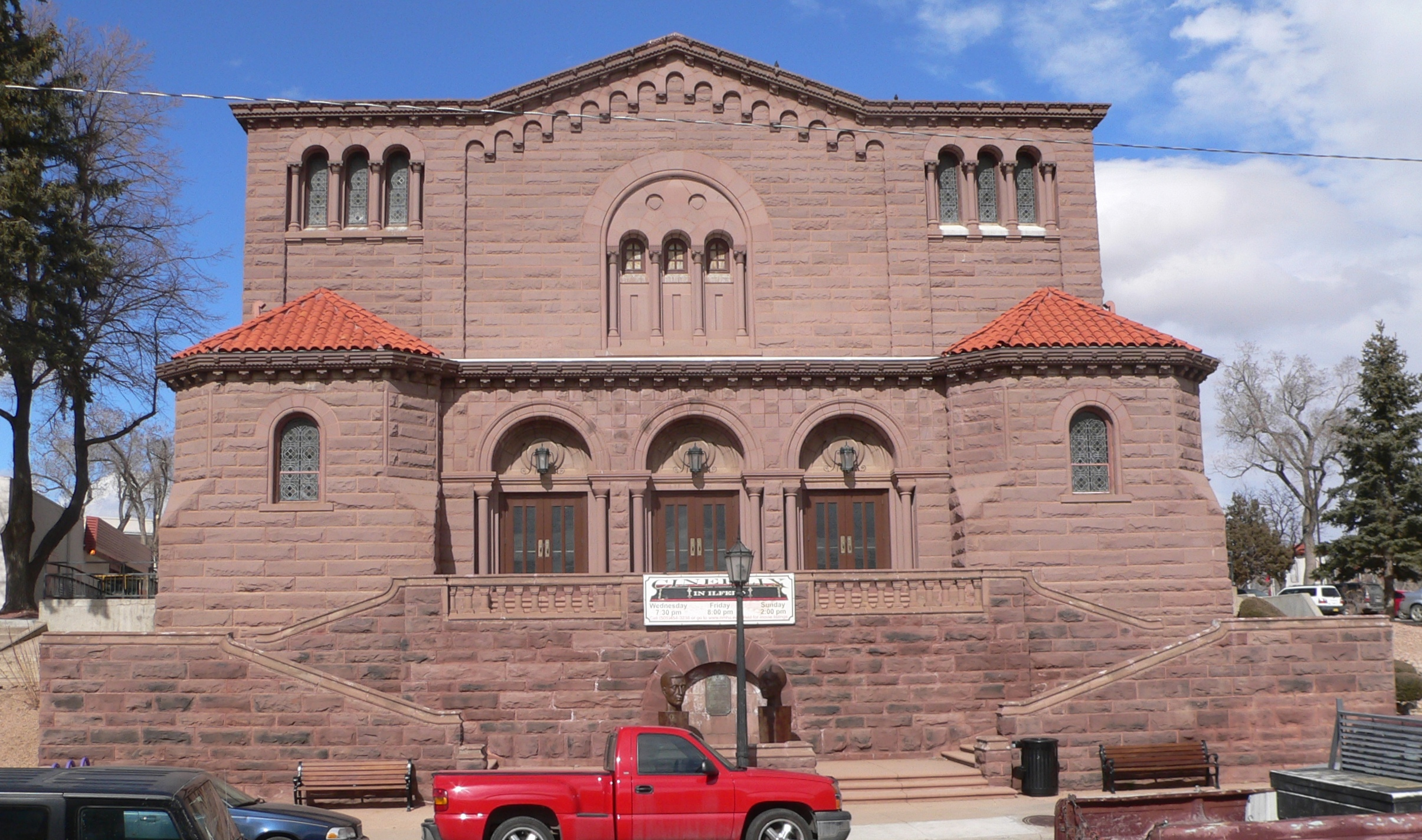

- Location within New Mexico
- Location: New Mexico Highlands University campus, Las Vegas, New Mexico
- Coordinates: 35°35′41″N 105°13′11″W
- Area: 1 acre (0.40 ha)
- Built: 1914, 1919-31
- Architects: Hart, E.W.
- Architectural style: Romanesque Revival
- MPS: Las Vegas New Mexico MRA (AD)
- NRHP reference No.: 80002568
- Added to NRHP: January 8, 1980

The Adele Ilfeld Auditorium, on the campus of New Mexico Highlands University in Las Vegas, New Mexico, is a brownstone Romanesque Revival structure built during the seventeen years from 1914 to 1931. It was listed on the National Register of Historic Places in 1980.

The building was asserted in 1979 to be "the most architecturally significant structure on the campus" and "critical to the appearance of the campus", while only one other building, the WPA-built Rogers Hall (1937), was deemed to be architecturally significant.

It was funded in 1914 by a $75,000 appropriation of the New Mexico State Legislature, and was designed by Las Vegas architect E.W. Hart in style compatible with the campus's Springer Hall. World War I intervened however, causing delay, and then the low bid for construction was over the appropriated sum. Charles Ilfeld made a contribution of $25,000 in memory of his wife Adele in 1919, and then construction began, but the funding was still inadequate to complete the interior. The unfinished building was nonetheless pressed into use after a June 1922 fire damaged Springer Hall. Additional state funding in 1929 plus an additional donation from Charles Ilfeld's sons enabled completion and furnishing of the building in 1931.

Its address is 900 University Avenue.

== See also ==
- Charles Ilfeld Memorial Chapel, also NRHP-listed
