= Piazza del Duomo =

Piazza del Duomo ("Cathedral Square") may refer to several squares in Italy:

- Piazza del Duomo (Altamura)
- Piazza del Duomo, Catania
- Piazza del Duomo, Florence
- Piazza del Duomo, Grosseto
- Piazza del Duomo, L'Aquila
- Piazza del Duomo, Milan
- Piazza del Duomo, Pisa
- Piazza del Duomo, Reggio Emilia
- Piazza del Duomo, San Gimignano
- Piazza del Duomo, Siena
- Piazza Duomo, Padua
