= Las Vegas Plaza (Las Vegas, New Mexico) =

- U.S. National Register of Historic Places
- U.S. Historic district
- NM State Register of Cultural Properties
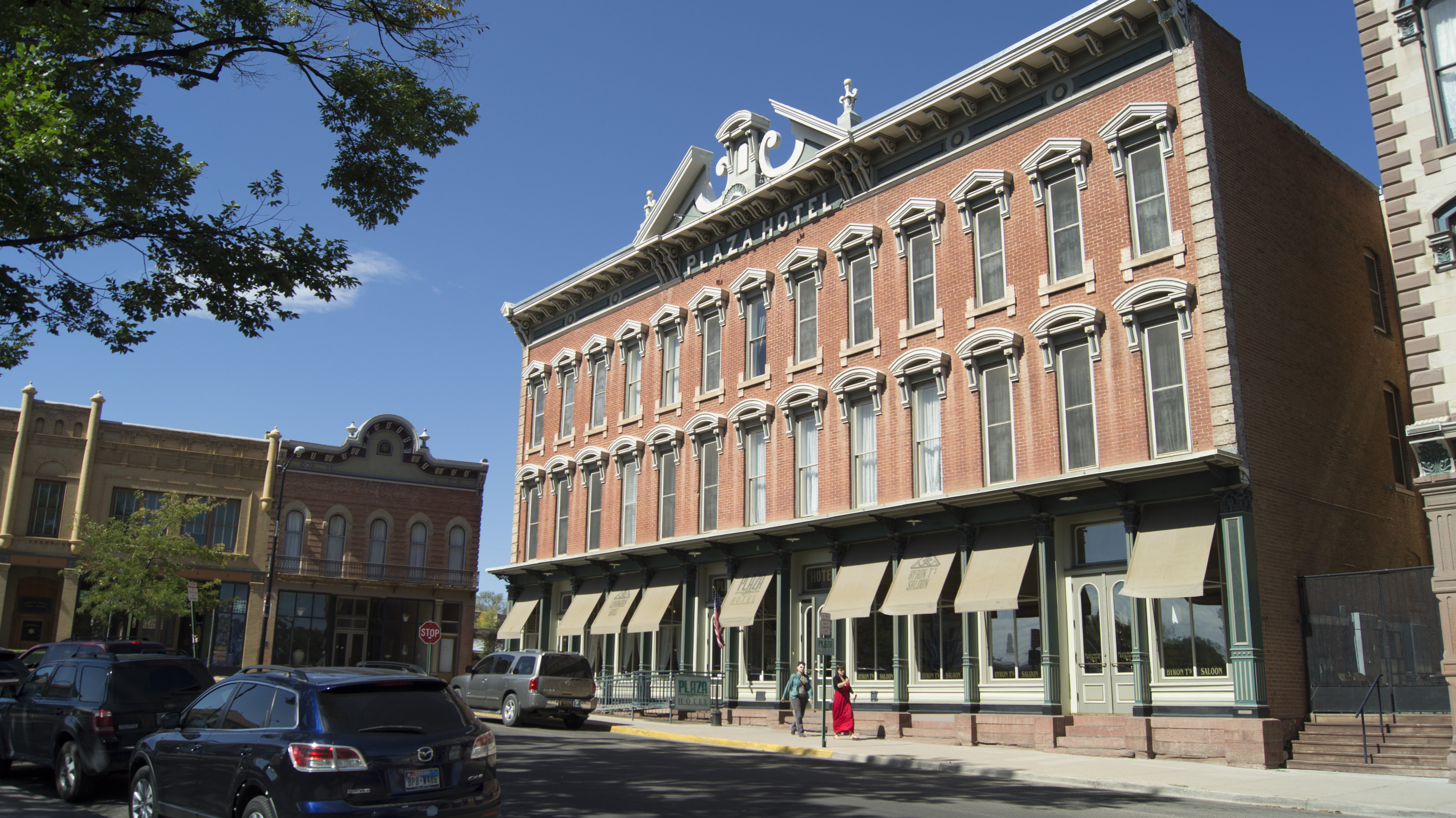
- Las Vegas Plaza

- Location within New Mexico Location within the United States
- Location: Bounded by Valencia and Moreno Sts. and the rear property line of the building on Gonzales St. and Hot Springs Blvd., Las Vegas, New Mexico
- Coordinates: 35°35′34″N 105°13′35″W
- Area: 2.5 acres (1.0 ha)
- Built: 1835
- Architectural style: Late 19th And 20th Century Revivals, Italianate, Territorial Style
- MPS: Las Vegas New Mexico MRA (AD)
- NRHP reference No.: 74001202
- NMSRCP No.: 267

Significant dates
- Added to NRHP: December 16, 1974
- Designated NMSRCP: December 8, 1972

The Las Vegas Plaza is a plaza and historic district in Las Vegas, New Mexico. The plaza was originally laid out in 1835 by Mexican settlers and is surrounded by a number of historically and architecturally notable buildings. It was listed in the National Register of Historic Places in 1974.

== History ==
Las Vegas was established in 1835 after a group of settlers received a land grant from the Mexican government. The town was laid out in the traditional Spanish Colonial style, with a central plaza surrounded by adobe buildings which could serve as fortifications in case of attack. Las Vegas soon prospered as a stop on the Santa Fe Trail. During the Mexican–American War in 1846, Stephen W. Kearny delivered an address at the plaza from atop what is thought to be the surviving Dice Apartments building, claiming New Mexico for the United States. In 1854, visiting attorney W. W. H. Davis wrote that the plaza "more resembled a muddy field than a public square, and all sorts of four-footed domestic animals were roaming at large over it."

Las Vegas prospered with the arrival of the railroad in 1880, and many of the one-story adobe buildings surrounding the plaza were replaced by larger and grander structures like the Italianate style Plaza Hotel and Ilfeld Building. During this period, the plaza itself was cleared of livestock and wagons and converted to a tidy public park with trees, fences, and a bandstand.

== Notable buildings ==
Contributing properties in the Plaza historic district include

- Plaza Hotel, built 1880
- Charles Ilfeld Building, built 1882
- Dice Apartments, the oldest surviving building on the plaza
- John D. Veeder Building
- Exchange Hotel, built 1850 (only one wing extant)
- Romero Mercantile Company Building
- First National Bank Building, built 1880

== See also ==
- National Register of Historic Places listings in San Miguel County, New Mexico
