= Cathedral Square =

Cathedral Square may refer to:

- Cathedral Square at St John's Cathedral (Brisbane) Australia
- Cathedral Square, Christchurch, New Zealand
- Cathedral Square, Gibraltar
- Cathedral Square, Glasgow, Scotland
- Cathedral Square, Letterkenny, Ireland
- Cathedral Square, Moscow, Russia
- Cathedral Square Park, Milwaukee, Wisconsin, United States
- Cathedral Square, Mobile, Alabama, United States
- Cathedral Square, Perth, Australia
- Cathedral Square, Vilnius, Lithuania
- Praça da Sé, São Paulo, Brazil
- Cathedral Square station, a light rail station on Sacramento, California, United States

== See also ==
- Cathedral Road (disambiguation)
- Piazza del Duomo (disambiguation)
