= Trinity Triptych =

Painting by Domenico Beccafumi

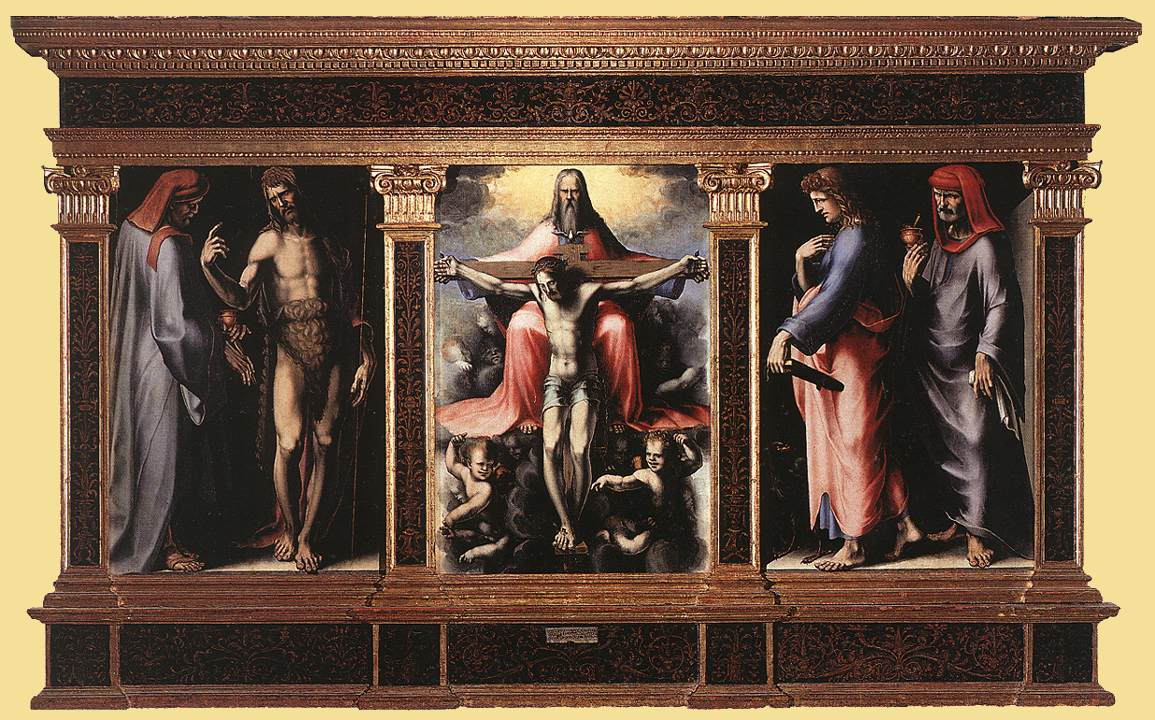
Trinity Triptych (1513) by Domenico Beccafumi

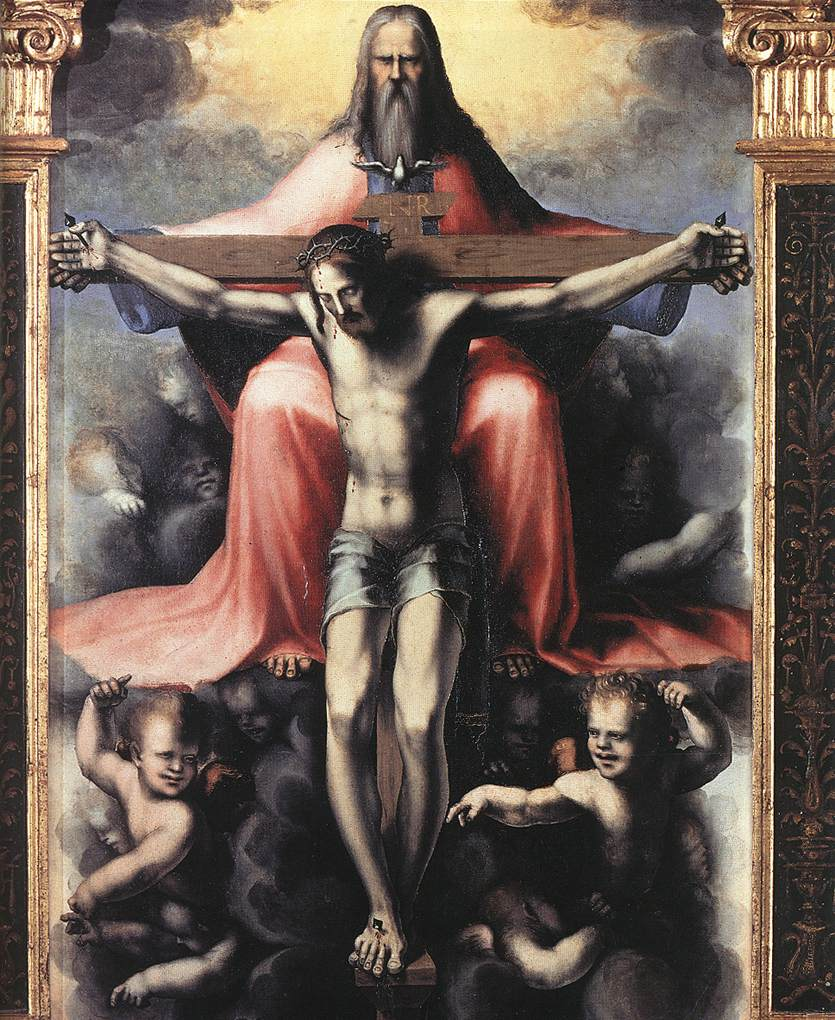
Detail

The Trinity Triptych is a 1513 oil-on-panel painting by the Italian Mannerist painter Domenico Beccafumi, now in the Pinacoteca Nazionale in Siena.

Beccafumi's earliest surviving painting, it was produced as the altarpiece for the Cappella del Manto in the Santa Maria della Scala hospital complex, where it remained until 1818. This influenced the choice of Cosmas and Damian as two of the accompanying saints, flanking John the Baptist and John the Evangelist. The artist also produced a fresco cycle for that chapel, of which only Joachim and Anna Meeting at the Golden Gate survives.

A prestigious work in light of the commissioning institution's importance and wealth, it showed Beccafumi's welcome back to Siena (he had just returned from Rome at the time). A cartouche on the frame records the work was commissioned by Battista d'Antonio da Ceva "for his devotion[s]". As shown in documents rediscovered by Samminiatelli, the work was delivered during February and March 1513 at a fee no greater than 35 florins. Vasari's Lives of the Artists argued the work's main influence was Perugino but in fact that the artist's influence was absent in favour of Sienese and Florentine art of the period, particularly Fra' Bartolomeo's simplification of volume, Sodoma's fluidity and Filippino Lippi's expressive restlessness. The cherubs in cloud recall Raphael's recent Foligno Madonna, which Beccafumi may have seen in Rome as a work in progress, while the restlessly moving and individualised figures and contrasting colours both prefigure Mannerism.
