= Cathedral Road =

Cathedral Road may refer to:

- Cathedral Road, Cardiff, in Wales
- Cathedral Road, Letterkenny, in Ireland

== See also ==
- Cathedral Square (disambiguation)
