= Oratory of the Compagnia di Santa Caterina della Notte =

Church in Siena, Italy

Coordinates: 43°19′6.14″N 11°19′42.57″E

The Oratory of the Compagnia di Santa Caterina della Notte is a highly decorated prayer hall present in the top floor of the medieval Hospital of Santa Maria della Scala (also referred to as the Hospital, Ospedale, and Spedale) in Siena, region of Tuscany, Italy.

== History ==
The oratory was sponsored by the 14th-century lay confraternity of Santa Caterina della Note, originally Confraternity of San Michele Arcangelo, which was dedicated to the care of the sick and dying. The site of the oratory traditionally was where St Catherine of Siena herself would sleep while at work in the hospital. The actual spot is traditionally the wall where under a canopy is a wooden statue of the sleeping saint.

The single nave oratory with rounded arches, and wooden choir stalls, was last refurbished in the 17th century with stucco decoration. It housed oil canvases by Rutilio Manetti and Francesco Rustici. They depict scenes from the Life of Saint Catherine:

- Jesus appears to Catherine as a Poor Beggar
- Catherine drinks the blood of Redemption from the wounded chest of Jesus
- Catherine before the Pope in Avignon
- Decapitation of Niccolò di Tuldo

The oratory also has canvases depicting events of the Gospels, including the Birth of the Virgin, Nativity, Adoration of the Magi, and Death of the Virgin. The main altar has a 14th-century marble statue of the Madonna and Child. The main altars statues of Saints Dominic and Catherine, along with the angels were attributed to Giovanni Antonio Mazzuoli. The sacristy has a gilded gothic-style triptych (1400) depicting the Enthroned Virgin and Child' flanked by a St John the Baptist and St Andrew Apostle, painted by Taddeo di Bartolo. Other paintings in the sacristy depict St Catherine receives the Stigmata, White Hooded Members of the Fraternity show Devotion to Catherine their Protector, Deposition and Resurrection are attributed to Giacomo Pacchiarotti.
