= Piazza del Duomo, Reggio Emilia =

Coordinates: 44°41′52″N 10°37′49″E

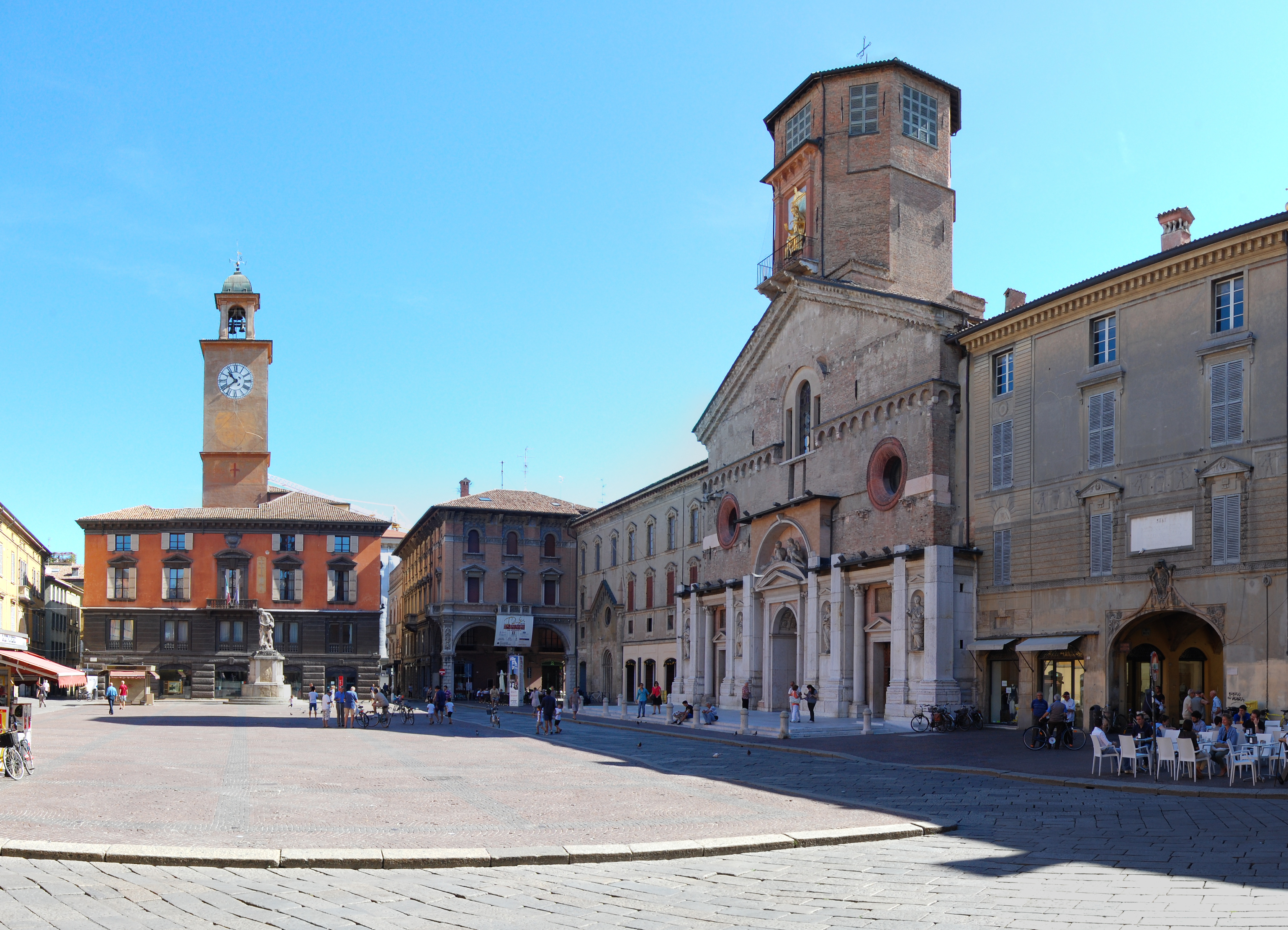
Piazza del Duomo

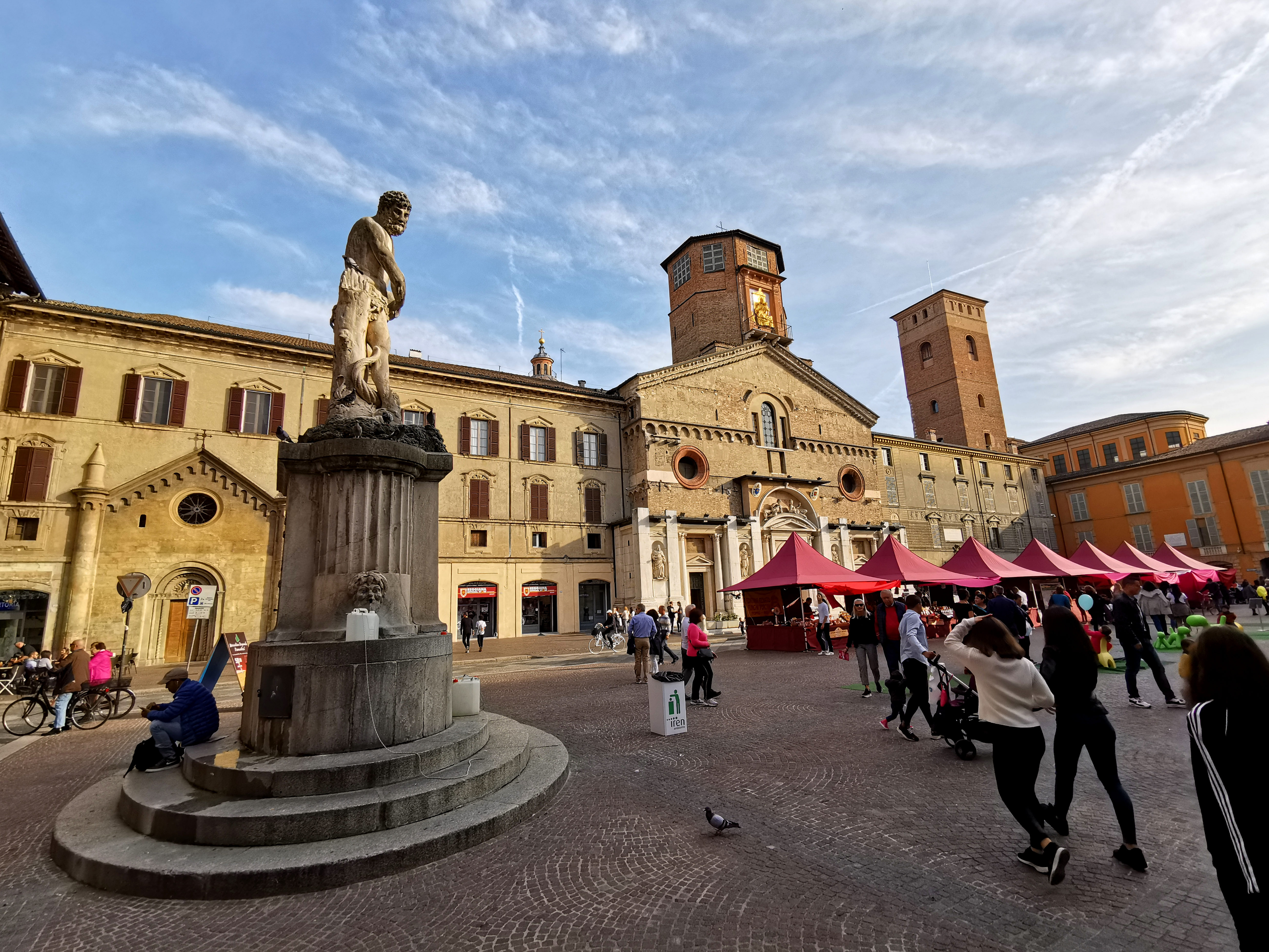
Piazza del Duomo, with the Cathedral and the Crostolo statue

Piazza del Duomo is a city square in Reggio Emilia, Italy.

== Buildings around the square ==
- Reggio Emilia Cathedral
