= Council of Siena =

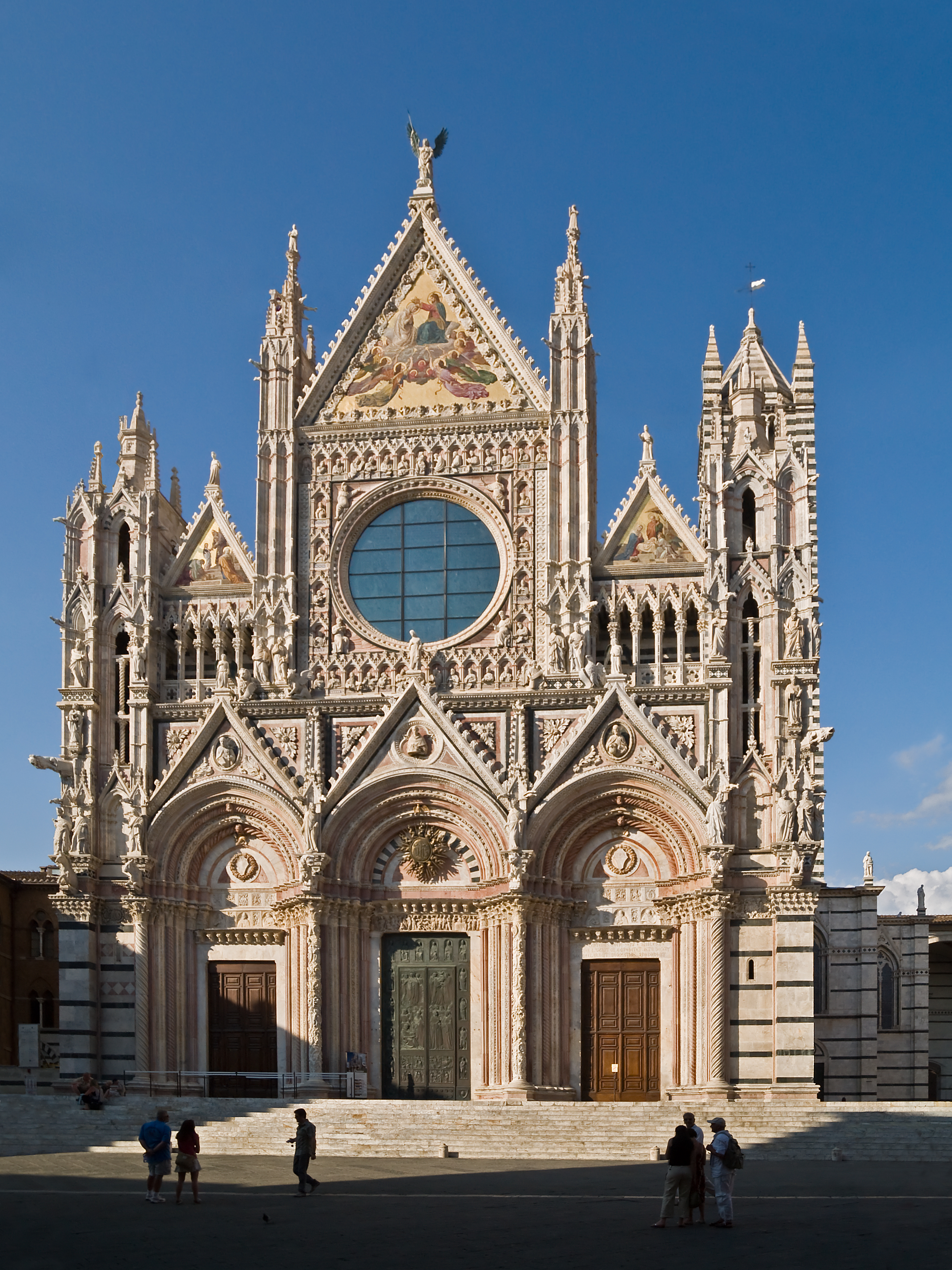
Siena Cathedral

In the Catholic Church, the Council of Siena (1423–1424) marked a somewhat inconclusive stage in the Conciliar movement that was attempting reforms in the Church. If it had continued, it would have qualified as an ecumenical council. In the official List of ecumenical councils, the Council of Siena is no longer listed, as the conciliarism expressed there was later branded as a heresy.

== History ==
According to the terms of the Council of Constance calling for periodic ecumenical councils to discuss church policies, Pope Martin V convened a council at Pavia, which was hardly inaugurated on 23 April 1423, when plague broke out at Pavia and the council was hastily adjourned to Siena.

At Siena, the procedure of the Council followed that established at Constance. Right at the start, certain formalities of the safe conducts issued by the city for the members of the Council were the cause of jurisdictional friction with papal prerogatives. Attendance to the Council was sparse, specially for high ranking prelates from transalpine regions; at the opening session of November 6, the Council only counted with two cardinals and twenty-five mitred prelates (bishops), as representatives of the higher clergy. Nevertheless, on the eighth of November four decrees were published, all of them directed against easy targets: against the followers of the heretical reformers, Jan Hus, recently burnt at the stake at the Council of Constance despite a promise of safe conduct, and against the English followers of John Wycliffe, who claimed that the highest authority was the Bible; against the followers of the schismatic Antipope Benedict XIII; a decree postponing the negotiations with the Greeks and other Eastern Orthodox churches (which were later worked into acceptable compromises in the long working sessions of the Council of Florence, 1438 to 1445); and a decree advising greater vigilance against heresy, the easiest target of all.

The formal proceedings of the council were held in the Cathedral of Siena, while the sessions that did not require a liturgical celebration were held in its sacristy.

Proposals for genuine institutional reform within the Catholic Church hung fire ominously. French proposals for more local control ("Gallican" proposals, generally speaking) produced resistance from the loyalists of the Papal Curia. Nothing was accomplished at Siena in that area.

On 19 February 1424, Basel was selected as the place of the next Council and the Council dissolved itself the following day (the decree published 7 March). The French members would have preferred to continue the Council until a thorough reform of the church had been accomplished, both "in capite et in membris" ("in its head and its members"), but whether in order to avoid a new schism, or whether on account of fear of the Pope (since Siena in southern Tuscany was near the Papal States), they departed. The selection of the venue for the next council, far from the armed temporal authority of the Papacy, is significant.

The magistrates of Siena took care not to let anyone depart until he had paid his debts.
