= Piazza del Duomo, Siena =

City square in Siena, Italy

Piazza del Duomo
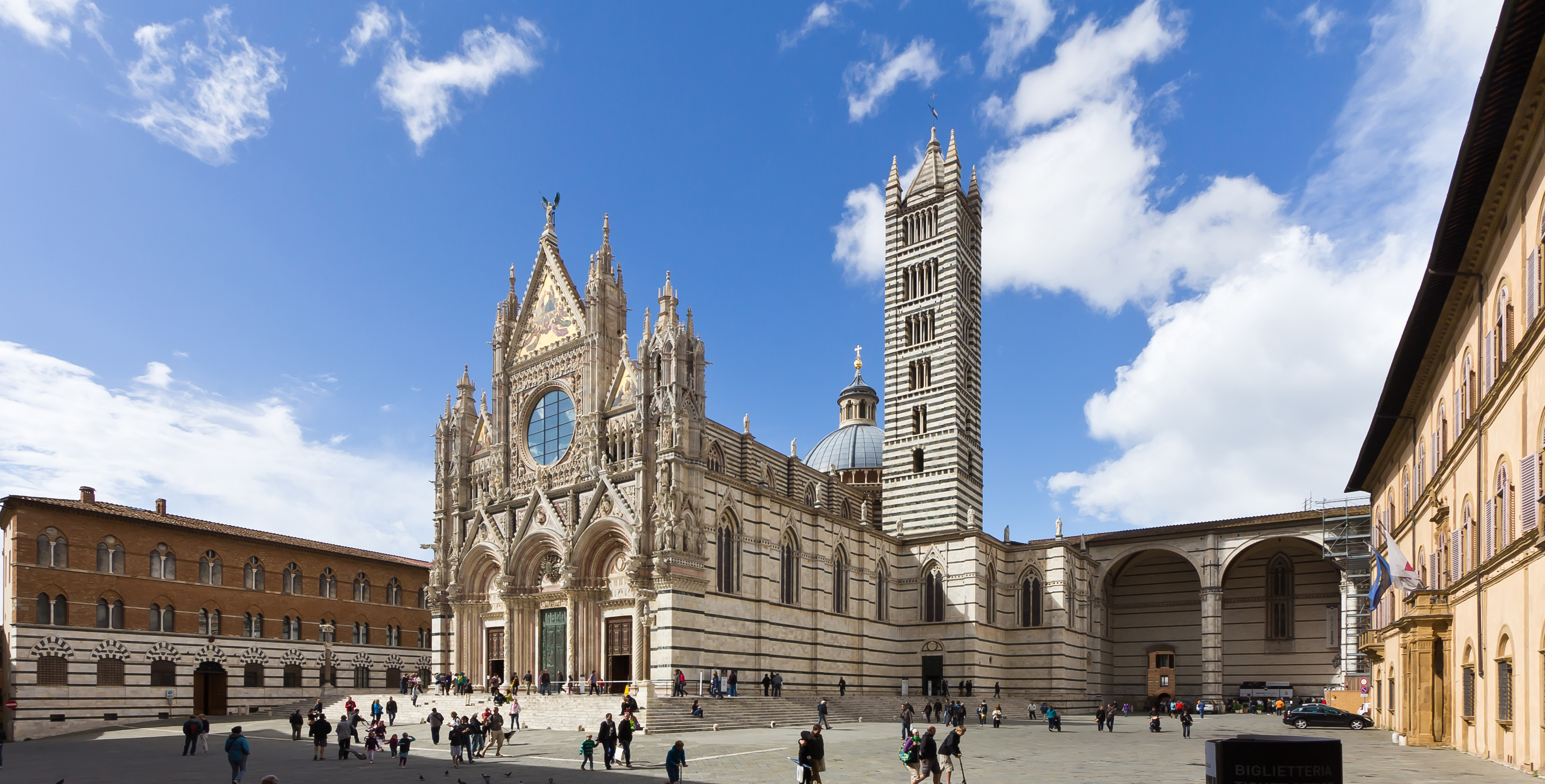

- Location within Tuscany
- Location: Siena, Tuscany, Italy
- Coordinates: 43°19′02″N 11°19′44″E

Piazza del Duomo is a city square in Siena, Italy.

== Buildings ==
- Santa Maria della Scala
- Siena Cathedral
- Palazzo Reale
