= Charles Ilfeld Memorial Chapel =

- U.S. National Register of Historic Places
- Location within New Mexico
- Location: Masonic Cemetery, at Colonias & Romero, Las Vegas, New Mexico
- Coordinates: 35°35′48″N 105°14′16″W
- Area: less than one acre
- Built: 1912
- Architectural style: Tudor Revival
- MPS: Las Vegas New Mexico MRA
- NRHP reference No.: 85002657
- Added to NRHP: September 26, 1985

The Charles Ilfeld Memorial Chapel, located in the Masonic Cemetery at Colonias & Romero in Las Vegas, New Mexico, was built in 1912. It was listed on the National Register of Historic Places in 1985.

The building serves as a chapel and as home for the Masonic Cemetery's caretaker. It is an L-shaped Tudor Revival-style building with buttresses at ends and midway. It is constructed of rusticated random ashlar sandstone, light brown in color, with reddish mortar. It has a dark brown wood shingle roof, half-timbering in its gable, bargeboards, and exposed rafters.

It was deemed significant as "one of the most richly finished Tudor Revival buildings in New Mexico". It was funded in 1912 by Charles Ilfeld "the State's leading nineteenth-century merchant", who later would fund completion of the larger Adele Ilfeld Auditorium.

== See also ==
- Adele Ilfeld Auditorium, also NRHP-listed in Las Vegas, New Mexico
