= List of railway roundhouses =

This is a list of railway roundhouses. A roundhouse is a building used for servicing locomotives, large, circular or semicircular structures often located adjacent to or surrounding turntables.

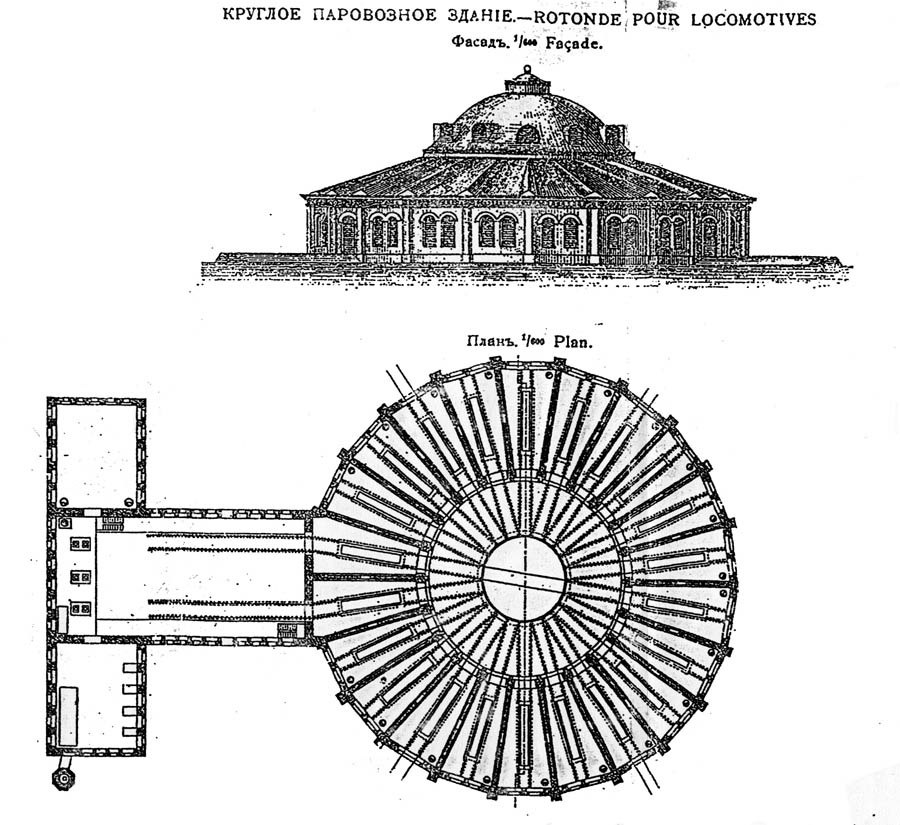
1850s drawing of facade and plan of the roundhouse for Moscow – Saint Petersburg Railway

== Australia ==
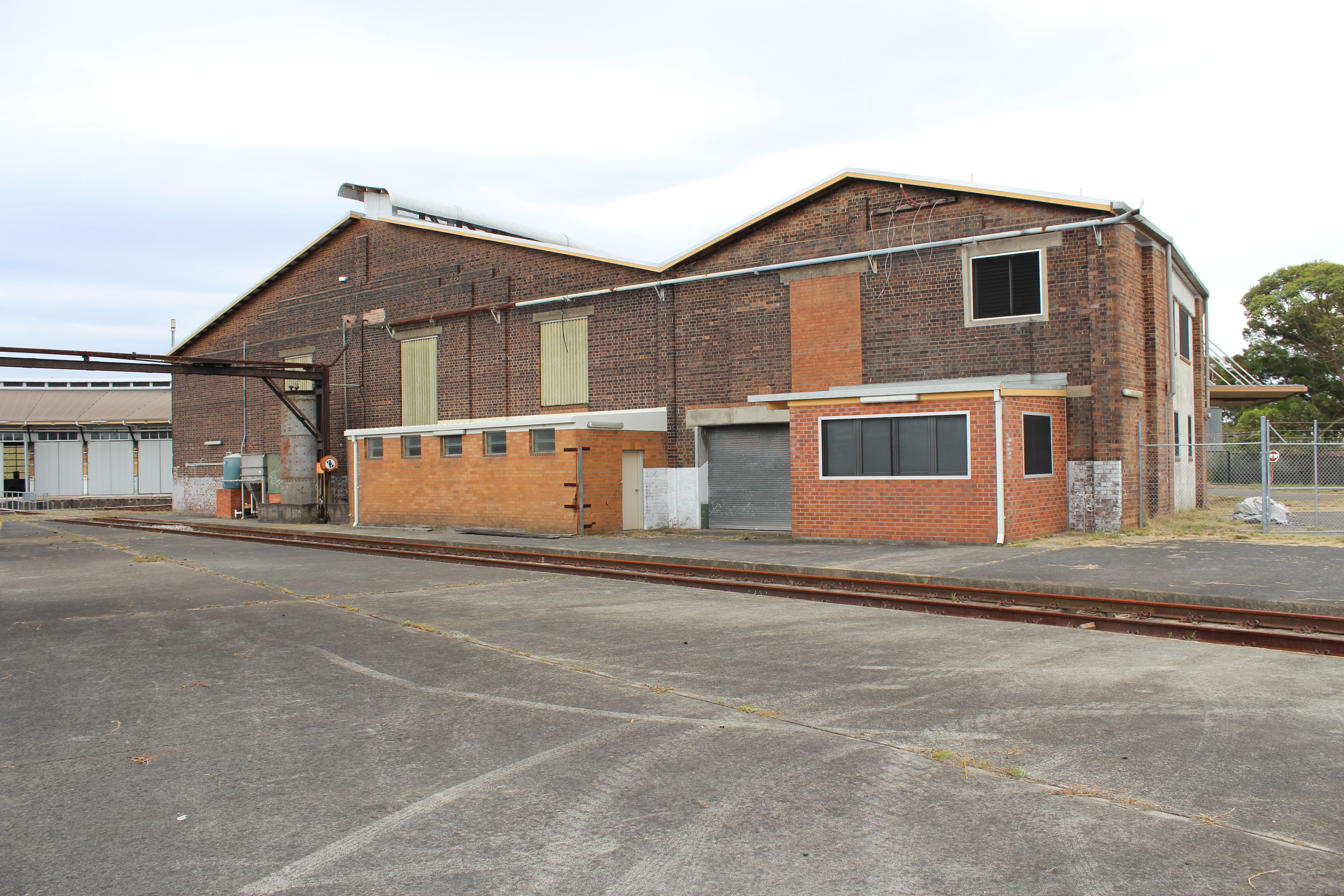
Exterior of the 'Garratt Shed' end of No. 2 Roundhouse at Broadmeadow Locomotive Depot

- Goulburn Rail Heritage Centre located, Goulburn, features the largest heritage based operating roundhouse in NSW and displays the historic transition from steam to diesel operations
- The Junee roundhouse, built in 1947, is being shared between the Junee Roundhouse Railway Museum, and the Junee Railway Workshop, the latter actively rebuilding, and servicing locomotives
- Steamtown Peterborough Railway Preservation Society, a railway museum, Peterborough, South Australia, includes a roundhouse
- Valley Heights Rail Museum, Valley Heights, 75 km west of Sydney, contains the oldest surviving roundhouse in Australia
- Broadmeadow Locomotive Depot, Broadmeadow, the 1948 vintage No. 2 roundhouse survives, a second roundhouse dating from 1924 was also on the site but it was demolished in 1990
- The Collie Roundhouse in Collie, Western Australia is rundown and not in use
- The Lachlan Valley Railway is based at Cowra roundhouse
- Pacific National use the remains of the roundhouse at Werris Creek
- Gemco Rail use the roundhouse at Parkes, New South Wales
- The roundhouse at Casino, New South Wales still stands although currently out of use
- Rockhampton Railway Roundhouse, built in 1915 is the only full circle roundhouse built in Queensland, and remains intact but out of use with stalls for 52 locomotives.

== Belgium ==
- Mariembourg roundhouse, small roundhouse with 5 stalls, no turntable. Houses the locomotives of the Chemin de fer à vapeur des Trois Vallées. It is the last in use roundhouse in Belgium.
- Florennes roundhouse, small roundhouse, not connected by rail anymore, overgrown. (coordinates: 50.252754,4.614074)

== Canada ==
=== Alberta ===
- Hanna, Alberta Roundhouse was designated a Provincial Historic Resource in August 2015, Hanna Roundhouse Society purchased the roundhouse, exterior turntable, and 9.97 acres in September 2013
- Heritage Park Roundhouse, Calgary, Alberta. Built to store the park's collection of railway equipment.
- Strathcona Roundhouse, Edmonton, Alberta. Built and used by the Canadian Pacific Railway, it is the last roundhouse in Alberta still in use. Once part of a much larger structure, only one stall remains. No turntable.
- Roundhouse, Big Valley, Alberta - preserved roundhouse and turntable ruins

=== British Columbia ===
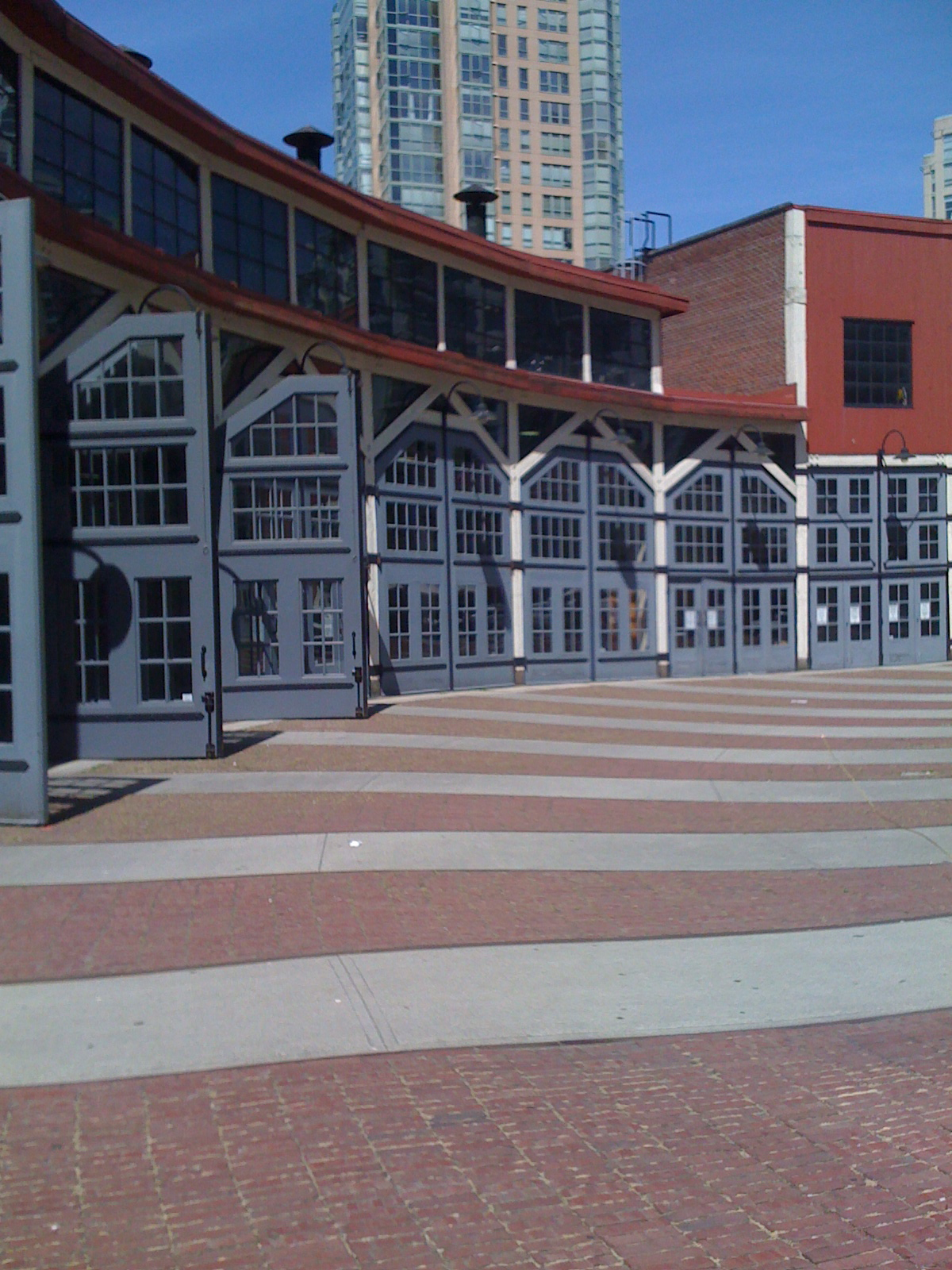
Vancouver Roundhouse Community Arts and Recreation Centre

- Vancouver Roundhouse, now the Roundhouse Community Arts and Recreation Centre, Vancouver, British Columbia
- CN Roundhouse & Conference Centre, Squamish, British Columbia. Reproduction railway museum roundhouse and event centre.
- The Esquimalt and Nanaimo Railway Roundhouse in Victoria, British Columbia

→

=== Ontario ===
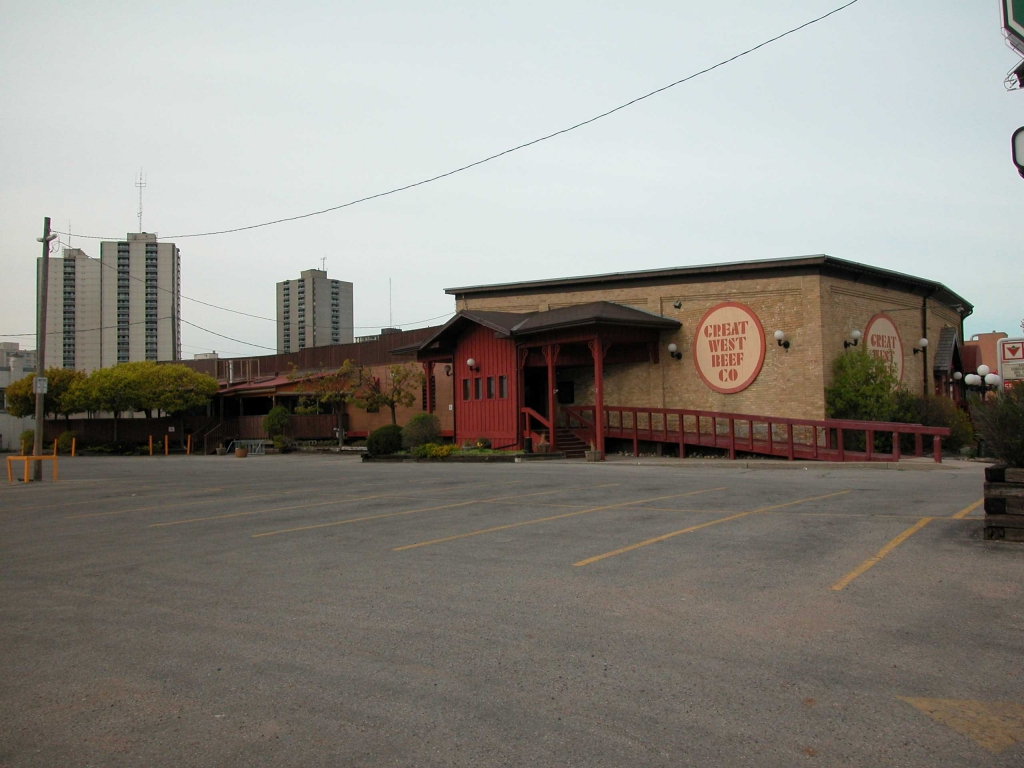
The Great Western Railway Roundhouse in London, Ontario, Canada

- John Street Roundhouse, Toronto, Ontario, which is now the Steam Whistle Brewing, was formerly a Canadian Pacific Railway steam locomotive repair facility
- CNR Spadina Roundhouse was also in Toronto until it was demolished in 1986.
- Michigan Central Railroad Roundhouse, 240 Waterloo Street, London, Ontario, constructed in 1887 to service steam locomotives and ceased operations in the late 1890s, restored as a digital media centre
- Roundhouse in Hornepayne, Ontario made by the Canadian National Railway
- Roundhouse, Capreol, Ontario - roundhouse structure remains but turntable removed
- Roundhouse, Chapleau, Ontario - turntable and roundhouse ruins

=== Quebec ===
- Roundhouse, Charny, Quebec - intact 39 stall Joffre Roundhouse and turntable, 2250 de la Rotonde Avenue, Charny, Quebec

=== Saskatchewan ===
- Biggar Roundhouse, built by the Grand Trunk Pacific Railway in 1909, demolished in 2015.

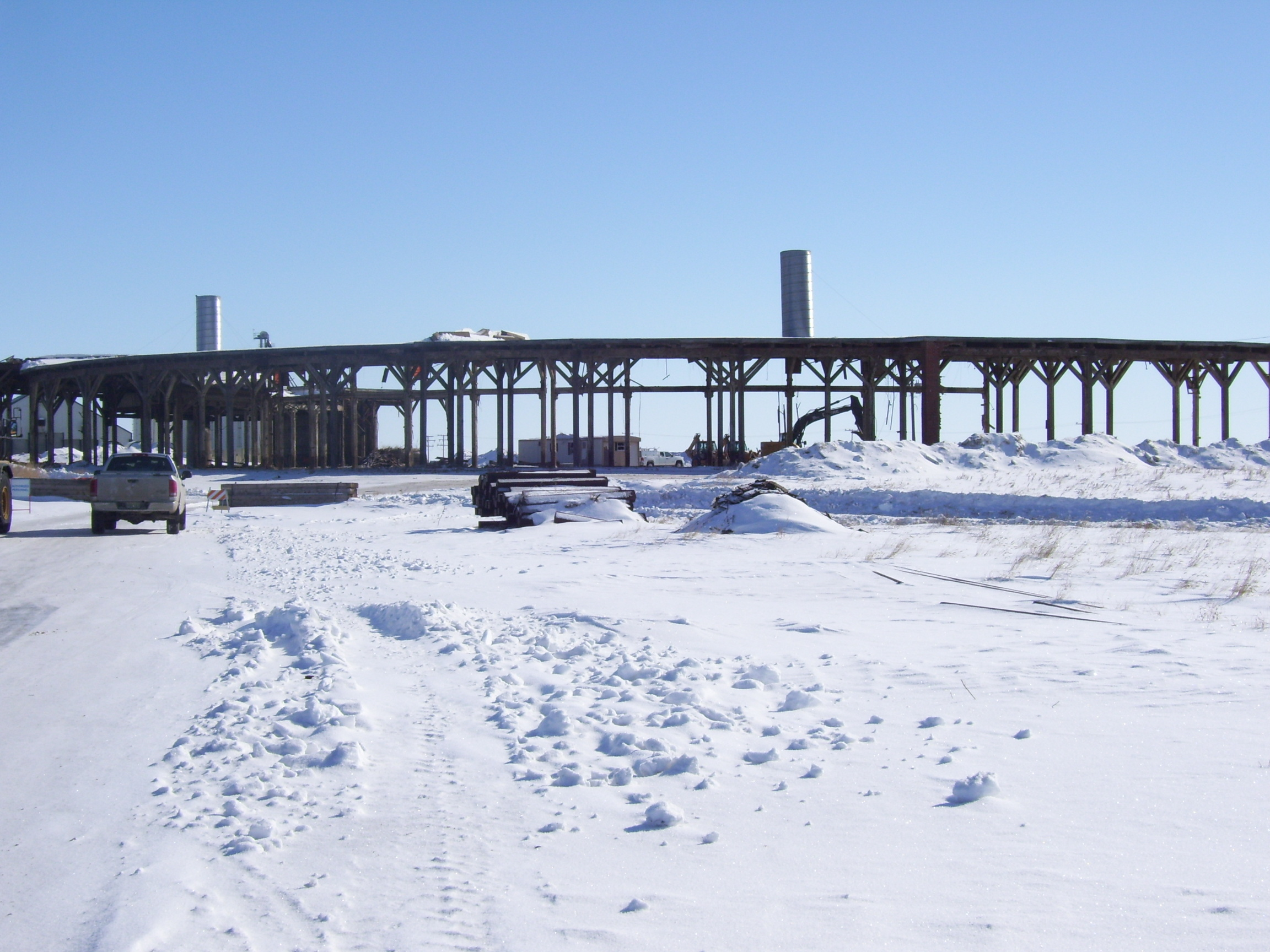
The Biggar, Saskatchewan Roundhouse being demolished

- Roundhouse, Prince Albert, Saskatchewan - ten stall roundhouse and turntable, 1550-5 Avenue East. Built by the Canadian Northern Railway, it is still in use by the Carlton Trail Railway.

== Chile ==
- Baquedano semi-circular roundhouse for 16 locos with turntable. Abandoned building claiming to be a museum, but unattended. Has 5 preserved (not restored) steam locomotives in and around the roundhouse, as well as old carriages and wagons. Is in the centre of a working railway yard - Baquedano Station. Site was used in the James Bond movie Quantum of Solace.

== France ==
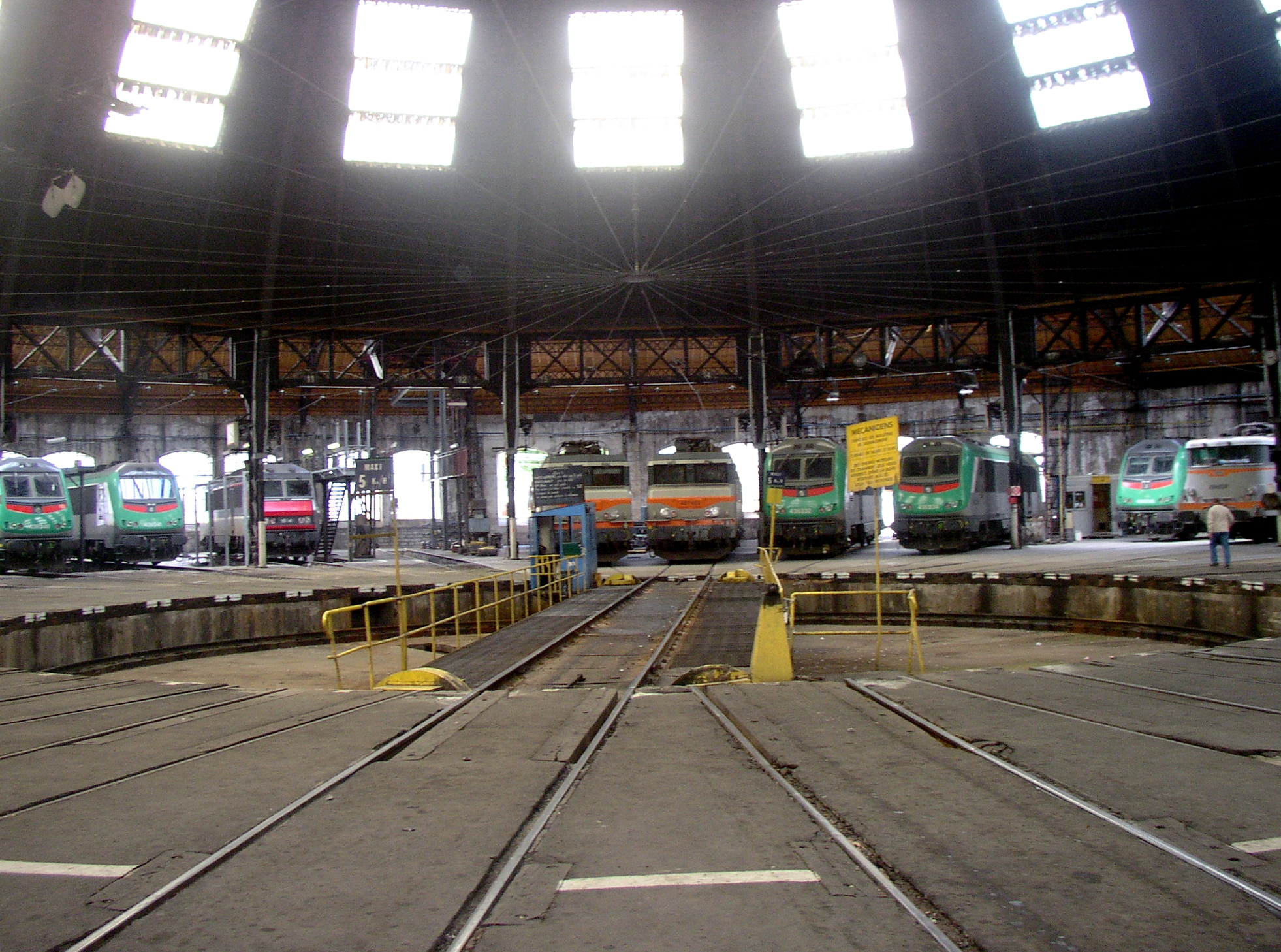
The Chambéry roundhouse in Chambéry, France

- Annemasse roundhouse (built in 1880, destroyed in 2017)
- Aubagne roundhouse
- Avignon roundhouses (two side-by-side)
- Bayonne roundhouse
- Bénestroff roundhouse
- Bizanos roundhouse
- Bordeaux roundhouse
- Castelnaudary roundhouse
- Chalindrey roundhouse
- Chambéry roundhouses (two side-by-side), built between 1906 and 1910, Chambéry
- Charleville-Mézières Mohon roundhouses (two side-by-side)
- Châtenoy-le-Royal roundhouses (two side-by-side)
- Clermont-Ferrand roundhouse
- Colmar roundhouse
- Damelevieres roundhouse
- Delémont roundhouse (two side-by-side), built between 1906 and 1910, Chambéry
- Dijon roundhouse
- Grigny roundhouse
- Longueau roundhouse
- Longueville roundhouse, Longueville, now the "Musée vivant du chemin de fer"
- Lyon roundhouses (three)
- Marseille roundhouses (three)
- Miramas roundhouse
- Modane
- Montabon roundhouse
- Montauban roundhouse
- Montluçon roundhouse
- Moulins roundhouse
- Mulhouse roundhouse
- Nevers roundhouse
- Nogent-Vincennes roundhouse, built in 1849 in Paris-la Villette depot where it was used until it was disassembled in 1859 and then rebuilt at Nogent-Vincennes depot
- Paris roundhouse
- Perthuis roundhouse (destroyed)
- Saint-Étienne roundhouse
- Strasbourg-Hausbergen roundhouses
- Sarrebourg roundhouse
- Thionville roundhouse
- Toulon roundhouse
- Valence roundhouse
- Valenton roundhouse

== Germany ==
- Augsburg, museum
- Bamberg: 2 (both half-demolished and in ruins)
- Berlin-Pankow-Heinersdorf
- Berlin-Rummelsburg
- Dresden: 2 (Plauen, Südvorstadt)
- Halle (Saale), originally 4, 3 left as one is destroyed in 2017. The one in best condition is now part of the DB Eisenbahn Museum.
- Hannover still occasionally used
- Neustrelitz
- Nürnberg (Bärenschanze): demolished
- Ottbergen, no longer rail connected
- Rostock
- Staßfurt
- Wittenberge, ruin

== Hungary ==
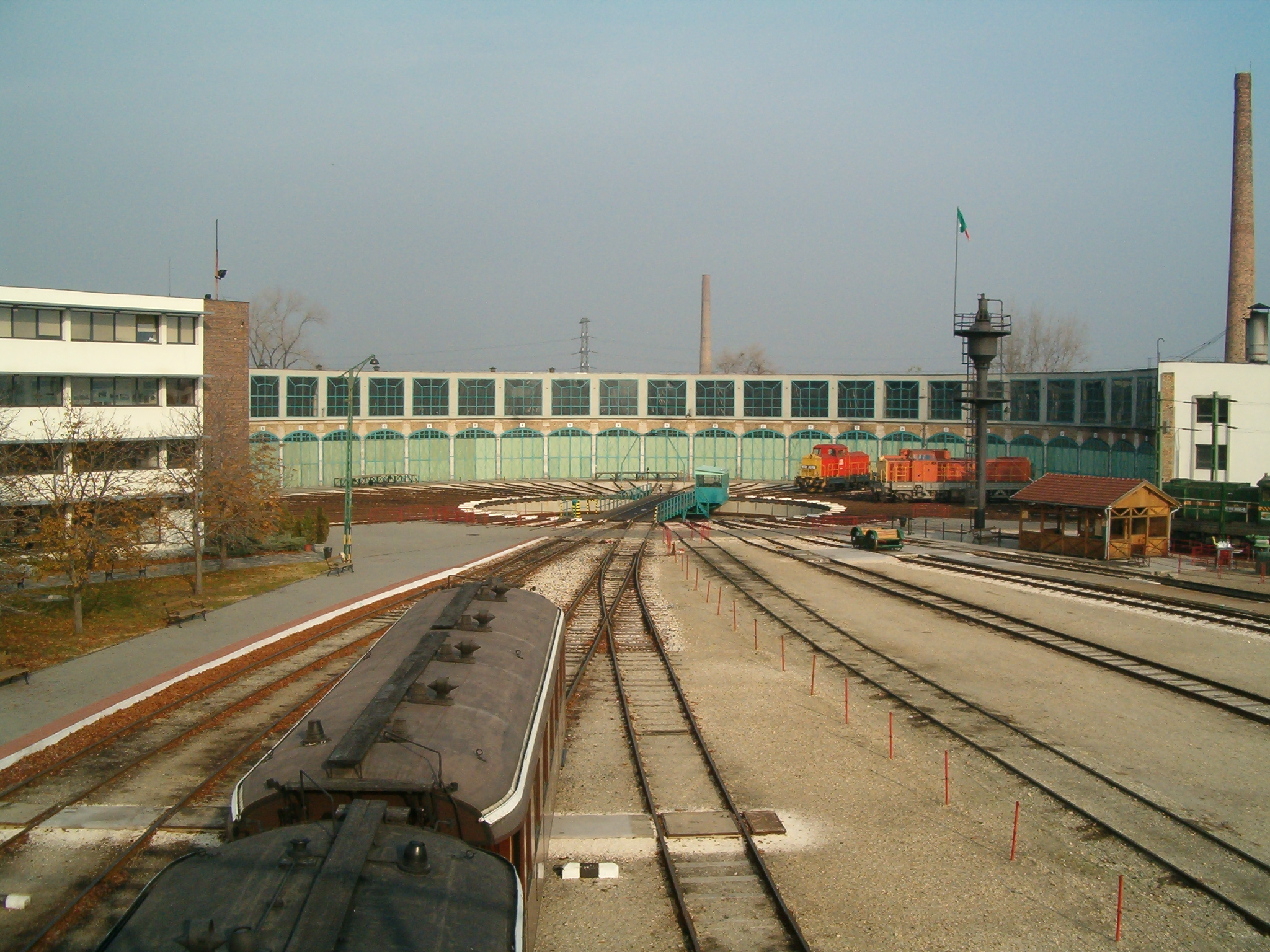
Budapest North Depot with turntable

- Budapest North Depot (now the Hungarian Railway Museum, 2 turntables)
- Székesfehérvár (operated by MÁV Hungarian State Railway),
- Dombóvár (operated by MÁV Hungarian State Railway),
- Szeged Marshalling Yard (operated by MÁV Hungarian State Railway),
- Pécs (operated by MÁV Hungarian State Railway),
- Ferencváros (operated by MÁV Hungarian State Railway, turntable with square engine shops),
- Miskolc Marshalling Yard (operated by MÁV Hungarian State Railway),
- ...

== Indonesia ==
- Indonesian Railway Company have 2 surviving roundhouses as in 2019: the one near Lempuyangan railway station in Yogyakarta and next to Tebing Tinggi station in North Sumatra. Although both no longer functioning as locomotive shed.
- Jatibarang Brebes Sugar Mill has a historic roundhouse for their fleet of 600mm locomotives.

== Italy ==
- Turin, near Porta Nouva terminal, 2 large roundhouses, one still currently in use by the FS electric locomotive fleet, the other is used as storage for historical equipment, neither accessible to public.
- Milan, Milano Smistamento roundhouse, used by Mercitalia Rail to store electric locomotives, historical equipment is also stored at the depot and various open-days were organised in the past during which historical locomotives would be parked in the roundhouse.

== Japan ==
- Umekoji Steam Locomotive Museum, Kyoto
- Tsuyama Roundhouse, Tsuyama

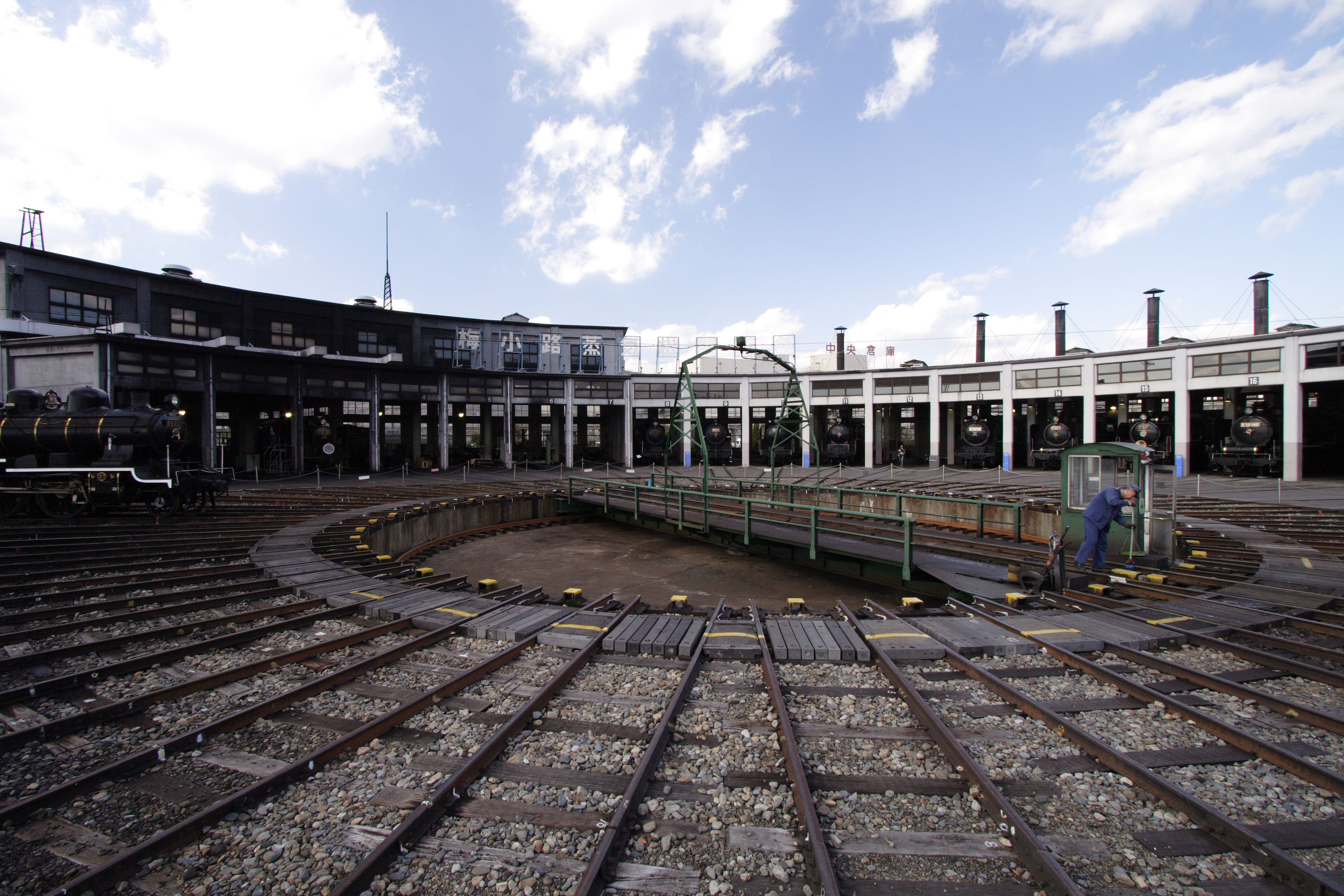
A roundhouse at Umekoji Steam Locomotive Museum in Japan

== Mexico ==
- Ferrocarriles Mexicanos yards southwest of downtown, Guadalajara
- Ferrocarriles Mexicanos yards, San Luis Potosi
- Ferrosur, Veracruz

== Poland ==
There are several dozen round houses still in operational use in Poland (albeit for diesel or electric locomotives) each with electric powered turntables. Many also remain extant but unused such as Gnieszno and Bydgoszcz. Below are ones associated with steam preservation.

- Roundhouse, Wolsztyn and Leszno, used daily in conjunction with scheduled PKP steam
- Okrąglak roundhouse in Piła
- Roundhouse Skierniewice
- Roundhouse Jaworzna Slaska
- Roundhouse Tczew
- Roundhouse in Czechowice Dziedzice (PKP Cargo)
- Roundhouse Bydgoszcz

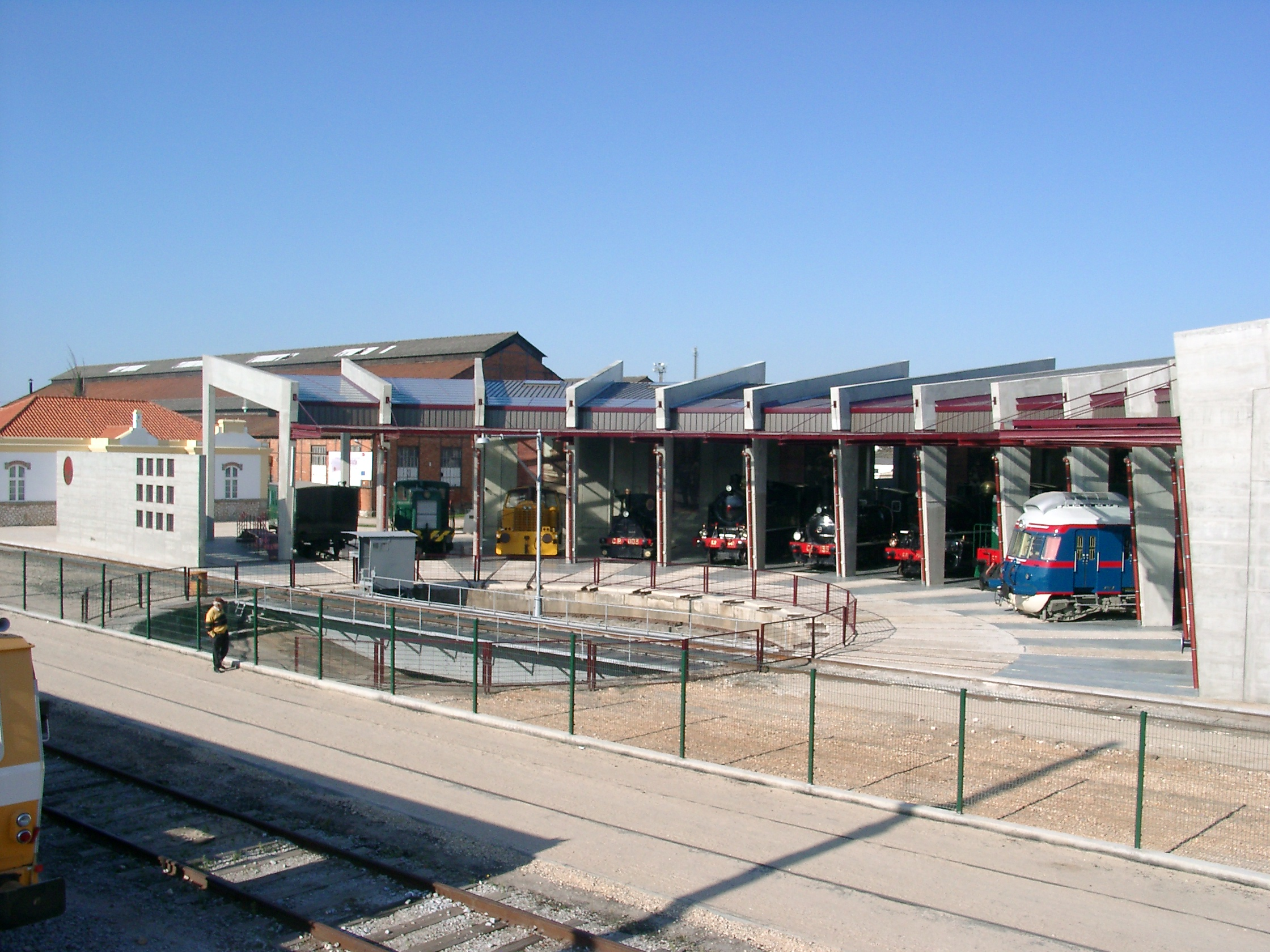
The roundhouse at the National Railway Museum Entroncamento in Entroncamento, Portugal

== Portugal ==
- Entroncamento Municipality Portuguese National Railway Museum
- Barreiro "Rotunda das Locomotivas" (Locomotive Roundabout) at the terminal railyard of the Alentejo Railway
- Castelo Branco "Rotunda das Locomotivas" (Locomotive Roundabout) at the terminal railyard of the Alentejo Railway

== Switzerland ==
- Brig roundhouse
- Erstfeld roundhouse
- Payerne roundhouse
- St-Maurice roundhouse
- The lok remise at Uster station, Ulster, canton of Zurich

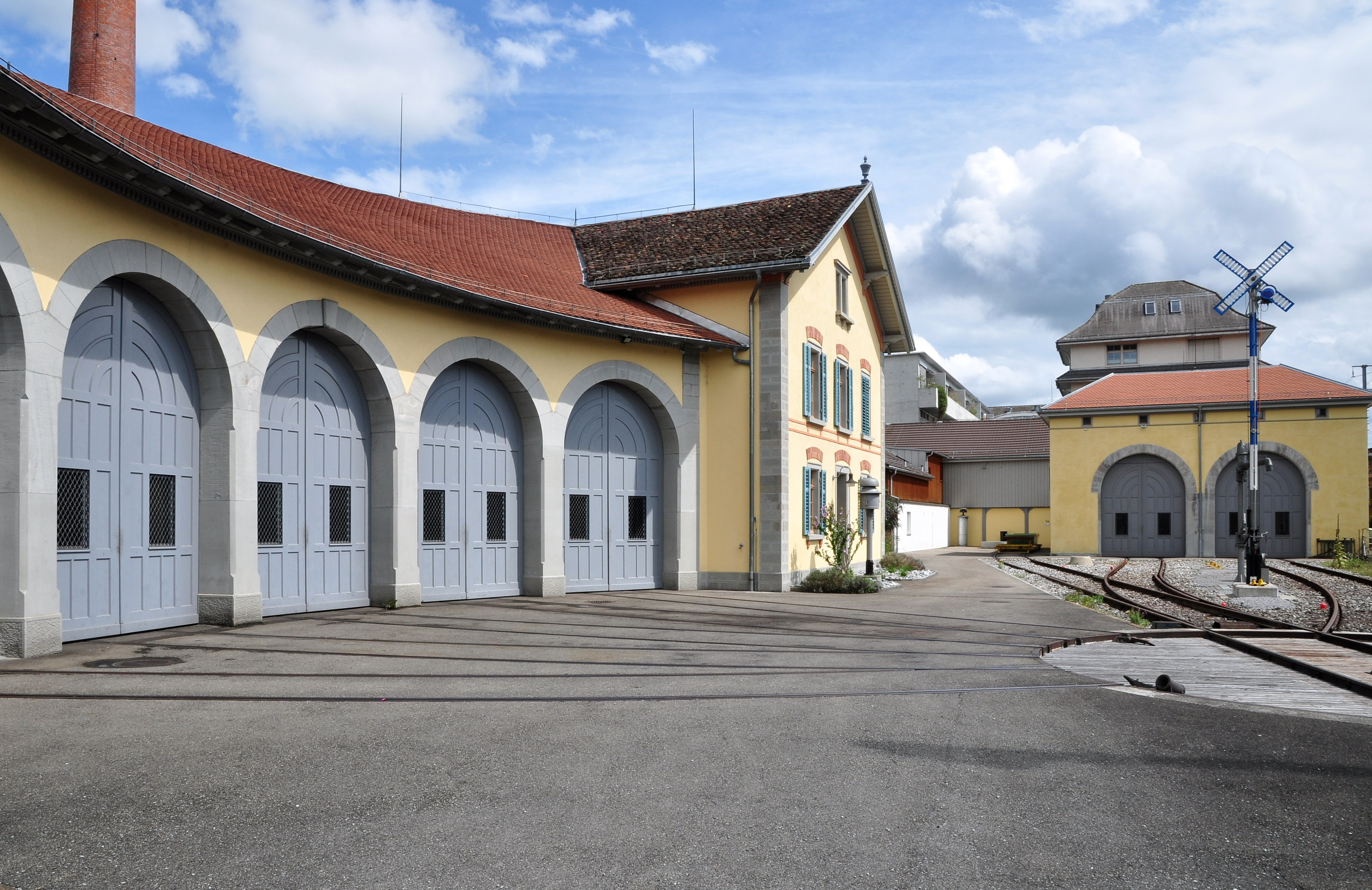
The restored roundhouse in Uster, Switzerland

== Sri Lanka ==
- Galle Railway Station
- Badulla Railway Station

== Taiwan ==
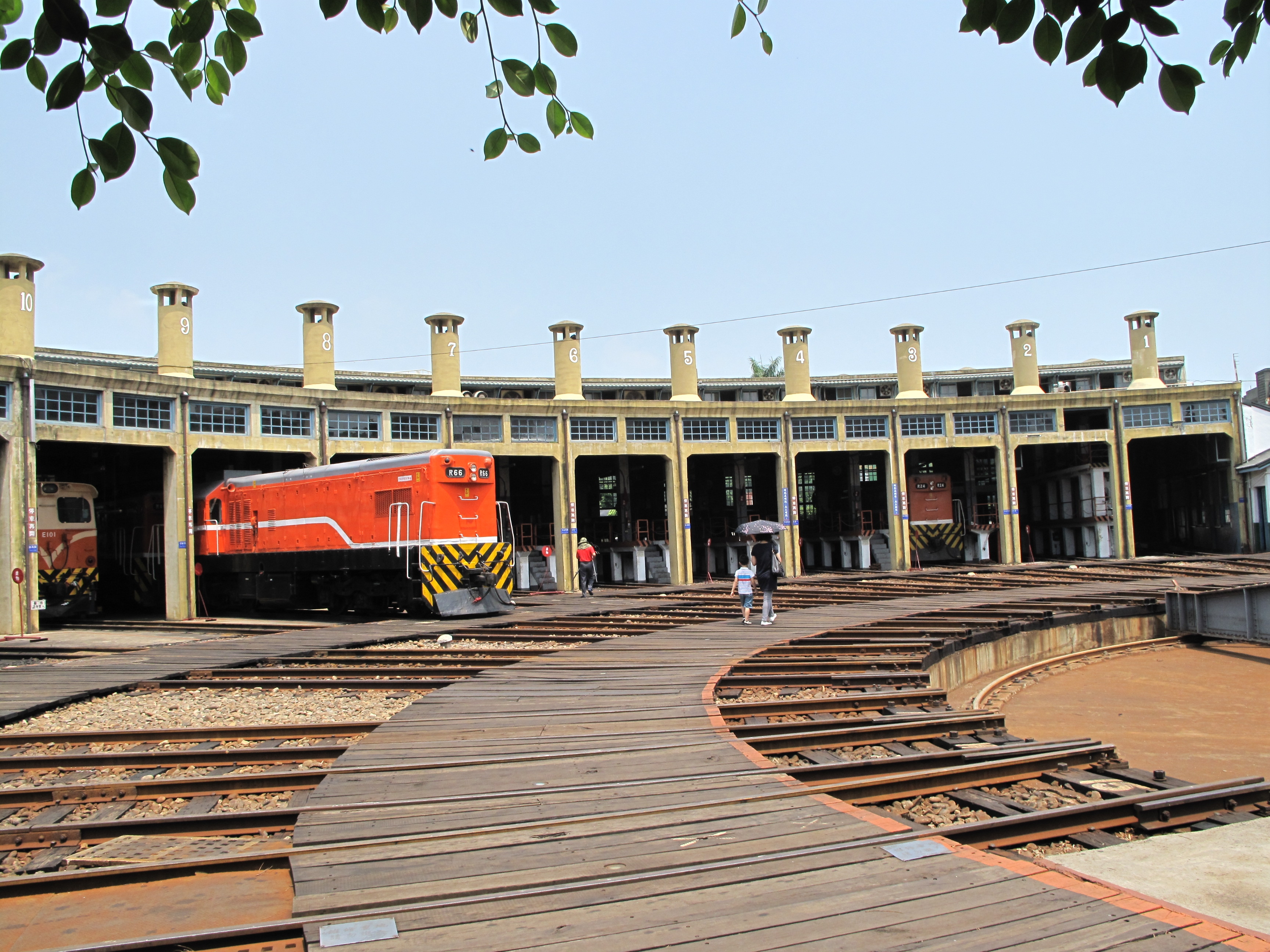
The Changhua Fan-Shaped Depot in Changhua City, Taiwan

- Changhua Roundhouse

== United Kingdom ==
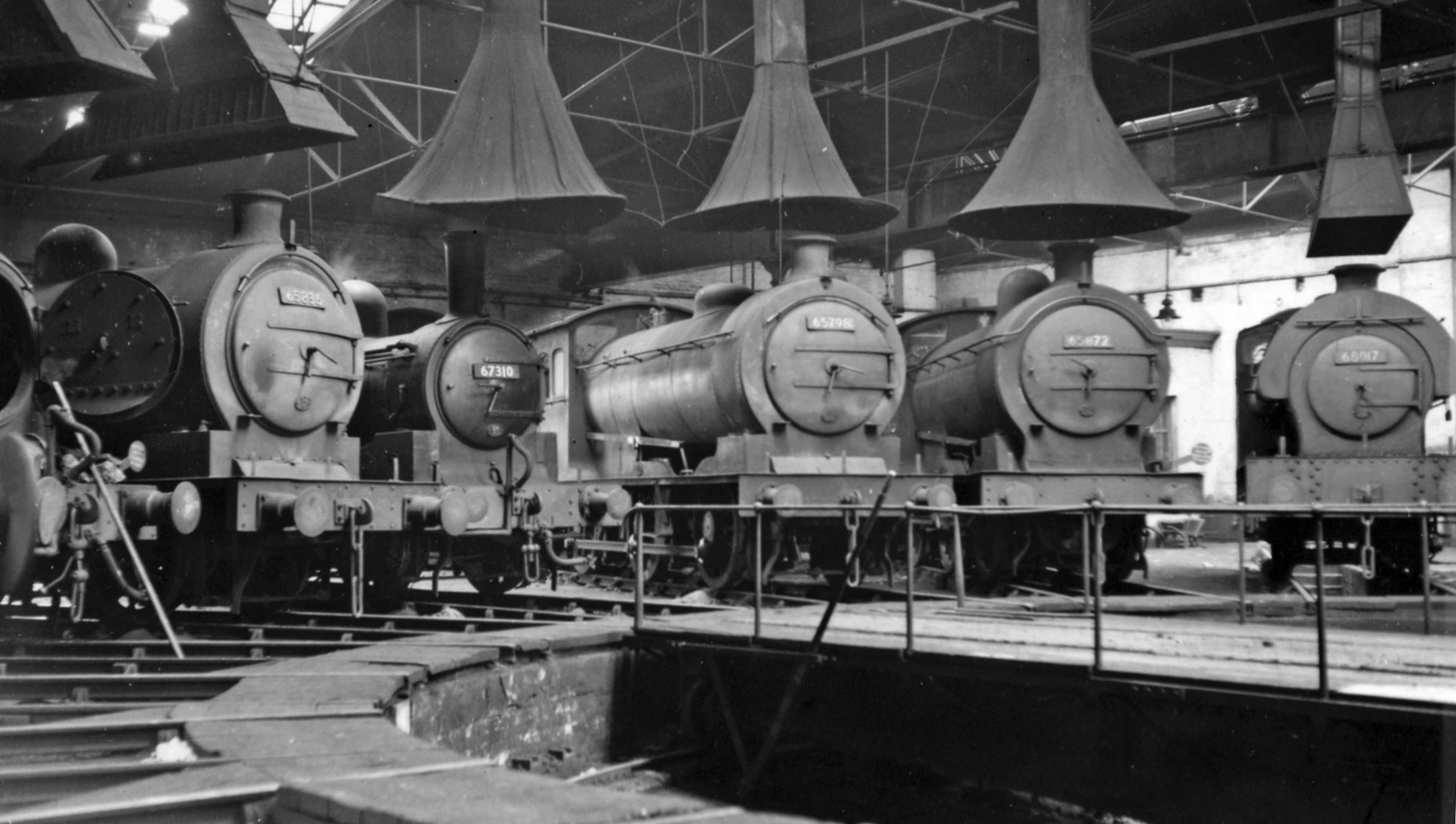
Sunderland South Dock locomotive depot

- Barrow Hill Engine Shed roundhouse, Derbyshire
- North Midland Railway roundhouse, listed building built in 1839, Derby, England
- The Roundhouse, Chalk Farm, London, England. Built in 1847, it was too small for its function within 20 years; it now houses an arts centre.
- Horsham Motive Power Depot
- Roundhouse and half-roundhouse, Wellington Road/Graingers Way, Leeds. Both structures were built in approximately 1847 and are listed buildings; the much larger roundhouse is occupied by a commercial vehicle hire company while the half-roundhouse is currently (May 2021) unoccupied.
- St. Blazey engine shed in Cornwall, now on Historic England's Heritage at Risk Register
- Statfold Barn Railway a narrow gauge round house aka the Grain Store.
- Sunderland South Dock locomotive depot

== United States ==
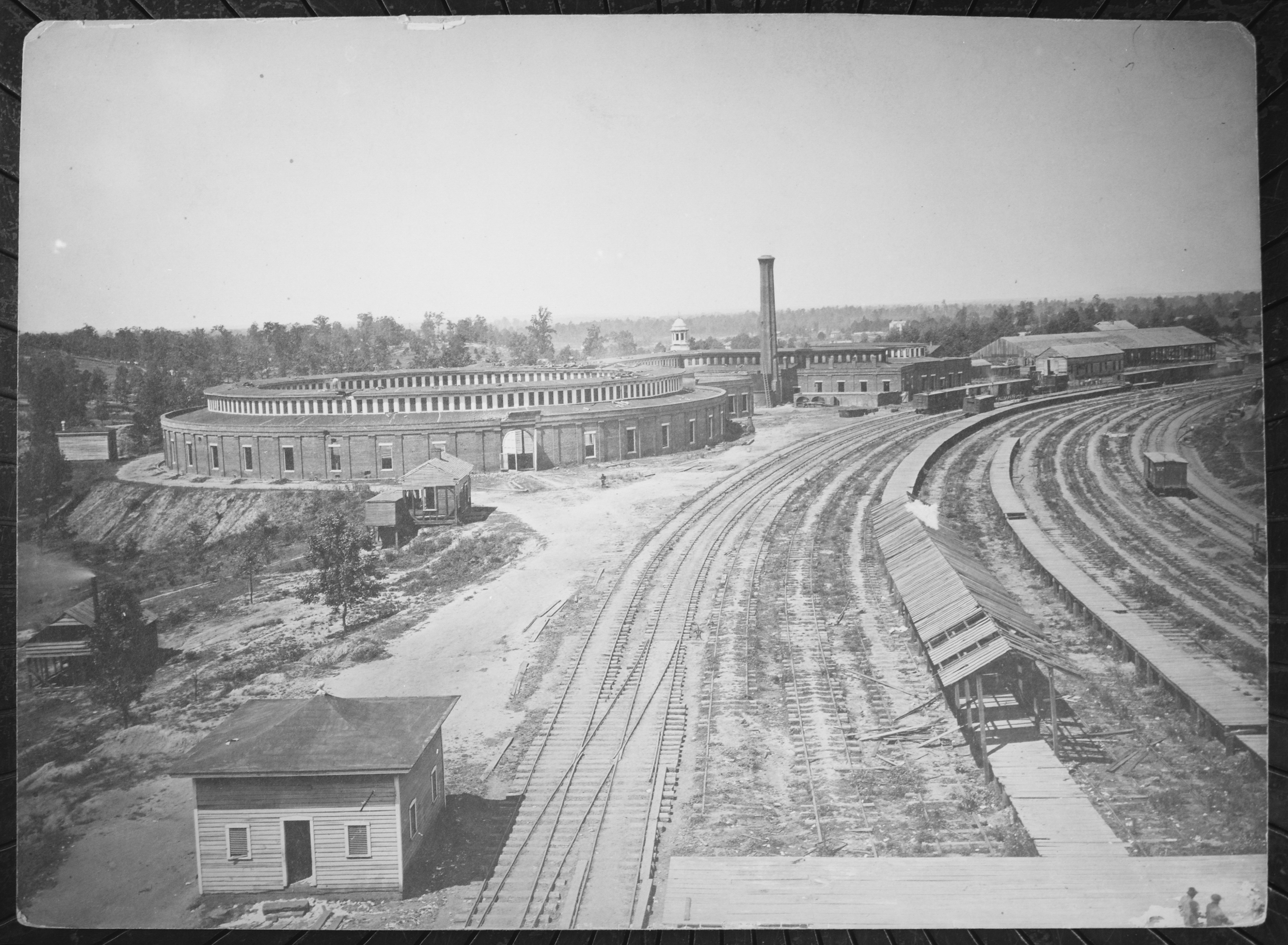
The roundhouse at Chattanooga Railroad in Atlanta, Georgia

Several of the historic roundhouses in the United States are listed on the National Register of Historic Places (NRHP).

=== Alabama ===
- Alabama Great Southern Railroad Finley Roundhouse, Birmingham, Alabama
- Louisville and Nashville Railroad roundhouse, Tarrant, Alabama
- Roundhouse, Tuscumbia, Alabama Building and turntable intact in May 2022.

=== Arizona ===
- Verde Tunnel & Smelter Railroad roundhouse, Clarkdale, Arizona
- El Paso and Southwestern Railroad roundhouse, Tucson, Arizona

=== Arkansas ===
- Hot Springs Railroad Roundhouse, Malvern, listed on the National Register of Historic Places
- St. Louis Southwestern Railway roundhouse, Jonesboro, Arkansas
- Arkansas Midland roundhouse, Malvern, AR, disconnected used for business

=== California ===
- Southern Pacific Railroad Bayshore roundhouse, Brisbane, California
- Railtown 1897 State Historic Park, Jamestown, California, includes a roundhouse
- California State Railroad Museum, Sacramento
- Timber Heritage Association is leasing the historic roundhouse and shops built back in the 1890s, Samoa, Humboldt County, California
- San Francisco Belt Railroad roundhouse, the Belt Railroad Engine House and Sandhouse, San Francisco, CA, NRHP-listed
- Lenzen Roundhouse, originally located in San Jose, California, currently disassembled while the California Trolley and Railroad Corporation searches for new site

=== Colorado ===
- Midland Terminal Railroad Roundhouse, Colorado Springs, Colorado, NRHP-listed. Now a retail mail.
- Chicago, Rock Island and Pacific Railroad roundhouse, Colorado Springs, Colorado
- Como Roundhouse, Railroad Depot and Hotel Complex, Como, Colorado, NRHP-listed
- Burlington Route roundhouse portion, Denver, Colorado, 2 stalls left of old CB&Q roundhouse included as part of current shop building
- Durango and Silverton Narrow Gauge Railroad roundhouse, Durango, Colorado
- Colorado Railroad Museum roundhouse, Golden, Colorado
- Union Pacific roundhouse, Hugo, Colorado
- Denver and Rio Grande Western roundhouse, Leadville, CO
- Tiny Town RR roundhouse & turntable, Morrison, CO 15" gauge tourist RR

=== Connecticut ===
- Connecticut Valley Railroad Roundhouse and Turntable Site, Old Saybrook, Connecticut, NRHP-listed
- Columbia Junction Roundhouse, Connecticut Eastern RR Museum, Built 11/1892, Razed ~1934, Rebuilt 9/2000, www.cteastrrmuseum.org, Willimantic, Connecticut

=== Georgia ===
- Southern Railway (U.S.) roundhouse, Peagram Yard, Atlanta, Georgia
- Roundhouse at the Georgia State Railroad Museum, formerly the Roundhouse Railroad Museum, Savannah, Georgia, NRHP-listed

=== Hawaii ===
- Roundhouse of the Hawaii Consolidated Railway, Hilo, listed in 2005 among most endangered historic sites in Hawaii
- Roundhouse of the Kahului Railroad, Kahului, Maui, located at 140 Hobron Ave

=== Illinois ===
- Chicago, Burlington, & Quincy Roundhouse and Locomotive Shop, also known as Two Brothers Roundhose, Aurora, Illinois, NRHP-listed
- Chicago, Burlington and Quincy Railroad roundhouse, Beardstown, Illinois
- Roundhouse, Centralia, Illinois (as of 10/10/21 only foundations are left based on google earth)
- Chicago and North Western roundhouse, Chicago, Illinois
- Roundhouse, South Deering, Illinois (as of 17/05/23 only a 2 stalls and a part of the shops remain based on google earth)
- roundhouse, Missouri Pacific Villa Grove, IL, torn down to make room for solar panels October, 2022.

=== Indiana ===
- Roundhouse, Frankfort, Indiana
- Roundhouse, Gary, Indiana
- Indiana Harbor Belt Railroad, Gibson Roundhouse, Hammond, Indiana
- Southern Railway (U.S.) roundhouse, Princeton, Indiana down to a 1/4 when abandoned in 1958, mostly rotted away by 2/18
- roundhouse, Evansville, IN

=== Iowa ===
- Chicago and North Western Transportation Company roundhouse, Council Bluffs, Iowa
- Burlington, Cedar Rapids and Northern Railway roundhouse, Iowa City, Iowa
- Chicago, Rock Island and Pacific Railroad roundhouse, Manly, Iowa
- Chicago, Milwaukee, St. Paul and Pacific Railroad roundhouse, Nahant, Iowa
- Chicago, Milwaukee, St. Paul and Pacific Railroad roundhouse, North Sioux City, Iowa, now Siouxland Historical Railroad Museum
- Illinois Central Railroad roundhouse, Waterloo, Iowa
- Chicago and North Western roundhouse (small portion), Cedar Rapids

=== Kansas ===
- Chicago, Rock Island and Pacific Railroad roundhouse, Phillipsburg, Kansas, now Kyle Railroad

=== Kentucky ===
- Roundhouse, Covington, Kentucky
- Kentucky & Indiana Bridge Company roundhouse, Louisville, Kentucky

=== Louisiana ===
- Southern Pacific Railroad Roundhouse and Yard, Lafayette, Louisiana
- New Orleans Public Belt Railroad Roundhouse, New Orleans, Louisiana

=== Maine ===
- Maine Central Railroad Company roundhouse, Calais, Maine
- Roundhouse, Derby, Maine
- Bangor and Aroostook Railroad roundhouse, Caribou, Maine
- Grand Trunk Railway roundhouse, East Deering, Maine
- Bangor and Aroostook Railroad roundhouse, Millinocket, Maine
- Roundhouse, Northern Maine Junction, Maine
- Sandy River and Rangeley Lakes Railroad roundhouse, Phillips, Maine
- Rockland Turntable and Engine House, a roundhouse of the Maine Central Railroad Company, Rockland, ME, NRHP-listed
- Maine Central Railroad Company roundhouse, Rumford, Maine
- Roundhouse ruins at Conway Junction Railroad Turntable Site, South Berwick, ME, NRHP-listed
- Maine Central Railroad Company roundhouse, Waterville, Maine

=== Maryland ===
- Mt Clare Roundhouse, Baltimore, Maryland, which contains the B&O Railroad Museum
- Baltimore and Ohio Railroad Cumberland Roundhouse, Cumberland, Maryland, still in use by CSX as a locomotive shop
- Maryland and Pennsylvania roundhouse, E of Druid Lake, Baltimore, MD

=== Massachusetts ===
- Roundhouse, Athol, Massachusetts
- Roundhouse, Hyannis, Massachusetts
- Roundhouse, East Deerfield, Massachusetts damaged by windstorm in 2020, demolished after deemed structurally unsound, turntable remains.
- Roundhouse, N. of Chester, MA
- Roundhouse, Revere, MA

=== Michigan ===
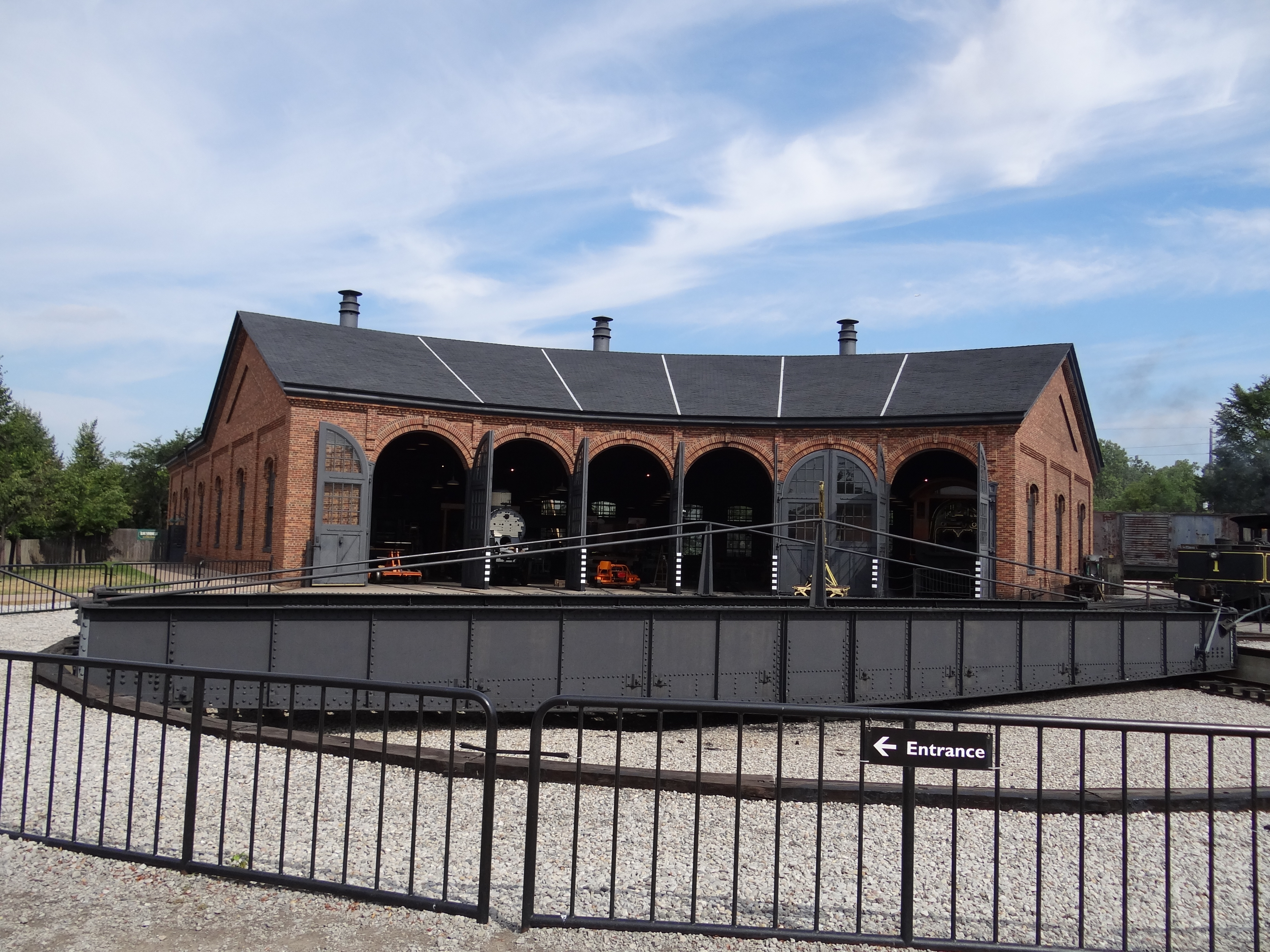
Detroit, Toledo & Milwaukee Roundhouse

- Lake Shore and Michigan Southern Roundhouse, Adrian, Michigan
- Detroit and Mackinac Roundhouse, Alpena, Michigan
- Calumet and Hecla Roundhouse, Calumet Michigan
- Detroit, Toledo & Milwaukee Roundhouse, a 2000 replica of an 1884 roundhouse at Greenfield Village, Dearborn, Michigan, which in 2000 was one of only seven working roundhouses open to the public in the U.S.
- Quincy and Torch Lake, Hancock Michigan
- Pere Marquette Roundhouse, New Buffalo, Michigan
- Michigan Central Railroad Roundhouse, Niles, Michigan
- Pere Marquette Roundhouse, Saginaw, Michigan

=== Minnesota ===
- Great Northern Railway roundhouse, Breckenridge, Minnesota
- Minneapolis, St. Paul and Sault Ste. Marie Railroad roundhouse, Minneapolis, Minnesota
- Duluth Missabe & Northern Railway roundhouse, Proctor, Minnesota
- Duluth, Missabe and Iron Range Railway roundhouse, Proctor, Minnesota
- Jackson Street Roundhouse, Saint Paul, Minnesota
- Roundhouse, Minnesota Commercial Railway, St. Paul, Minnesota
- Minneapolis, St. Paul and Sault Ste. Marie Railroad roundhouse, Thief River Falls, Minnesota
- Chicago, Milwaukee, St. Paul and Pacific Railroad roundhouse, Wabasha, Minnesota
- Roundhouse, Chicago, Milwaukee, St. Paul and Pacific Railroad (Pigs Eye yard, St. Paul, Minnesota)
- Soo Line roundhouse, 5 stall, Rollag, MN

=== Mississippi ===
- Columbus and Greenville Railway roundhouse, Columbus, Mississippi
- Illinois Central Railroad roundhouse, Jackson, Mississippi

=== Missouri ===
- Roundhouse, Joplin, Missouri
- Kansas City Terminal Railway Company Roundhouse Historic District, Kansas City, MO, NRHP-listed
- Roundhouse, Steelville, Missouri

=== Montana ===
- Butte, Anaconda and Pacific Railway roundhouse, Anaconda, Montana
- Great Northern Railway (U.S.) roundhouse, Butte, Montana
- Roundhouse, Glendive, Montana
- Chicago, Milwaukee, St. Paul and Pacific Railroad roundhouse, Harlowton, Montana
- Great Northern Railway (U.S.) roundhouse, Whitefish, Montana

=== Nebraska ===
- Roundhouse BNSF McCook, Nebraska; turntable demolished
- Roundhouse (portion) BNSF, Holdredge, NE; no turntable
- Roundhouse (portion) BNSF, W. Lincoln, NE
- Roundhouse (split 1/2 circle), BNSF, Chadron, NE

=== New Hampshire ===
- Conway Scenic Railroad roundhouse, North Conway, New Hampshire
- Boston and Maine Corporation roundhouse, Dover, New Hampshire
- Boston and Maine Corporation roundhouse, North Walpole, New Hampshire
- Bartlett Roundhouse, Bartlett, NH, NRHP-listed, a Portland and Ogdensburg RR roundhouse
- Boston & Maine 2 stalls of original roundhouse Nashua, NH
- Boston & Maine full Roundhouse saved and incorporated into retail complex Keene, NH

=== New Jersey ===
- Central Railroad of New Jersey roundhouse, Cranford, New Jersey
- New York, Susquehanna and Western Railway roundhouse, Hawthorne, New Jersey
- Lehigh Valley roundhouse and turntable, Newark, New Jersey

=== New Mexico ===
- Roundhouse at Santa Fe Railway Shops (Albuquerque): at least there once was a roundhouse there (current status unclear). Edit 8/19/2019 According to the latest Google map, the turntable exists but the building is gone.
- Atchison, Topeka and Santa Fe Railway roundhouse, the AT & SF Roundhouse, Las Vegas, New Mexico, NRHP-listed
- Cumbres and Toltec roundhouse, two stalls of original

=== New York ===
- Roundhouse, Batavia, New York
- Roundhouse, Binghamton, New York
- NY Central Railroad Roundhouse, Buffalo, New York
- Roundhouse, Manchester, New York
- Roundhouse, Richmond Hill, New York
- Pennsylvania Railroad Shops & Roundhouse, West Seneca, New York
- New York Central System roundhouse, Rouses Point, NY
- New York Central System roundhouse, Utica, NY
- Delaware, Lackawanna and Western Railroad roundhouse Utica, NY
- New York, Ontario and Western Railway roundhouse Utica, NY
- roundhouse, Woodlawn, NY (Buffalo area)
- roundhouse, Sloan, NY (Buffalo area)
- roundhouse, Retsof, NY 4/16 aerial shows working
- roundhouse, Rochester, NY B&O/NYC, disconnected but goes back to 1800s
- roundhouse, Auburn, NY Lehigh Valley RR
- roundhouse, Olean, NY Erie RR, disconnected 1/4 circle

=== North Carolina ===
- Norfolk Southern Roundhouse, Asheville, NC, demolished due to unsafe conditions
- Raleigh - Gaston Roundhouse, Raleigh, NC; building demolished, but turntable remains
- Spencer Shops Roundhouse at North Carolina Transportation Museum

=== North Dakota ===
- Great Northern Railway (U.S.) roundhouse, Grand Forks, North Dakota: once full circle, most stalls demolished (foundations remain). Turntable and some stalls still in use.
- Great Northern Railway (U.S.) roundhouse, Fargo, North Dakota; semi-circular roundhouse building & turntable demolished, but turntable & roundhouse foundation remains visible

=== Ohio ===
- Pennsylvania Railroad roundhouse, Ashtabula, Ohio
- Pennsylvania Railroad roundhouse, Crestline, Ohio; Roundhouse and turntable demolished, but foundations and backshops remain
- Roundhouse, Bellevue, Ohio
- Midwest Railway Preservation Society roundhouse, Cleveland, Ohio, former Baltimore and Ohio Railroad facility
- Chesapeake and Ohio Railway roundhouse, Parsons Yard, Columbus, Ohio
- Age of Steam Roundhouse, Sugarcreek, Ohio

=== Pennsylvania ===
- East Altoona Roundhouse, Altoona, Pennsylvania largest locomotive servicing roundhouse in the world in 1904; demolished in two phases in the 1960s
- Roundhouse, Chambersburg, Pennsylvania
- Roundhouse, Enola Yard, Enola, Pennsylvania
- Roundhouse, Hazelwood, Pennsylvania
- Roundhouse, now used by Waste Management, Pen Argyl, Pennsylvania
- East Broad Top Railroad roundhouse, Rockhill, Pennsylvania
- Steamtown National Historic Site, the former Scranton, Pennsylvania yards of the Delaware, Lackawanna and Western Railroad
- Roundhouse, North Bessemer, Pennsylvania
- Roundhouse, Hall, Pennsylvania
- Roundhouse, Greenville, Pennsylvania
- Roundhouse, New Castle, Pennsylvania
- Roundhouse, McKeesport, PA Roundhouse (no turntable) and machine shop
- Roundhouse, Mahoningtown, PA small roundhouse used for commercial business
- Roundhouse, North Pittston, PA Roundhouse remains

=== Rhode Island ===
- Narragansett Pier Railroad roundhouse, Peace Dale, Rhode Island

=== South Dakota ===
- Chicago, Milwaukee, St. Paul and Pacific Railroad roundhouse, Aberdeen, South Dakota; Currently 7 stalls, 22 stalls demolished (foundations visible), turntable demolished.
- Chicago and North Western Roundhouse, Huron, SD, NRHP-listed, now belonging to Rapid City, Pierre and Eastern Railroad; Once full circle, 15 stalls and the turntable remain.
- Black Hills and Fort Pierre Railroad roundhouse, Lead, South Dakota; Converted into restaurant.
- Prairie Village Museum roundhouse, Madison, South Dakota
- Roundhouse, Rapid City, South Dakota; 4 Stalls, no turntable

=== Tennessee ===
- Roundhouse, Bruceton, Tennessee
- Southern Railway Roundhouse, Knoxville, Tennessee
- CSX (ex L&N) Radnor Yard, Nashville, Tennessee

=== Texas ===
- San Antonio, Texas, turntable without roundhouse remains southwest of Duval & Hackberry Streets
- Cotton Belt Roundhouse, Texarkana, Texas in private hands, turntable gone
- CB&Q roundhouse, Amarillo, TX disconnected in the 1960s, now commercial property
- Mineola Texas roundhouse

=== Vermont ===
- Vermont Railway Headquarters, located in the former Rutland Railroad's roundhouse, Burlington, Vermont
- Central Vermont Railway roundhouse, Saint Albans, Vermont
- Central Vermont Railway roundhouse, White River Junction, Vermont a replica of the former roundhouse, now serving as a metallurgy business.
- Central Vermont Railway roundhouse, Newport, Vermont

=== Virginia ===
- Louisville and Nashville 8 stall roundhouse, Bristol, VA disconnected, used for commercial business
- Norfolk Southern 2 standing roundhouses, Roanoke, VA
- CSX roundhouse, Norfolk, VA

=== Washington ===
- BNSF Railway Interbay Roundhouse, at Balmer Yard, Seattle, Washington
- Simpson Lumber Railroad Roundhouse, now a Sierra Pacific Industries Maintenance Shop, Shelton, Washington

=== West Virginia ===
- B&O Martinsburg West Roundhouse, the oldest covered turntable in the U.S., included in Baltimore and Ohio Railroad Martinsburg Shops, Martinsburg, WV, NRHP-listed
- Norfolk and Western Railroad Williamson Roundhouse, a 21-stall roundhouse, Williamson, West Virginia, owned by Norfolk Southern Railway and used as a car shop

=== Wisconsin ===
- Wisconsin and Southern Railroad roundhouse, Janesville, Wisconsin
- Chicago and North Western Railroad roundhouse, Madison, Wisconsin
- Roundhouse, North Fond du Lac, Wisconsin
- Roundhouse, Spooner, Wisconsin
- Roundhouse, Superior, Wisconsin
- Roundhouse, Wisconsin Rapids, Wisconsin

=== Wyoming ===
- Union Pacific Roundhouse, Turntable and Machine Shop, Cheyenne, Wyoming, NRHP-listed, now part of the Wyoming Transportation Museum
- Roundhouse (1912) with 28 stalls, at Union Pacific Railroad Complex, Evanston, Wyoming, NRHP-listed
- Chicago and North Western Transportation Company roundhouse, Lusk, Wyoming
