= Rockland Turntable and Engine House =

- U.S. National Register of Historic Places
- U.S. Historic district
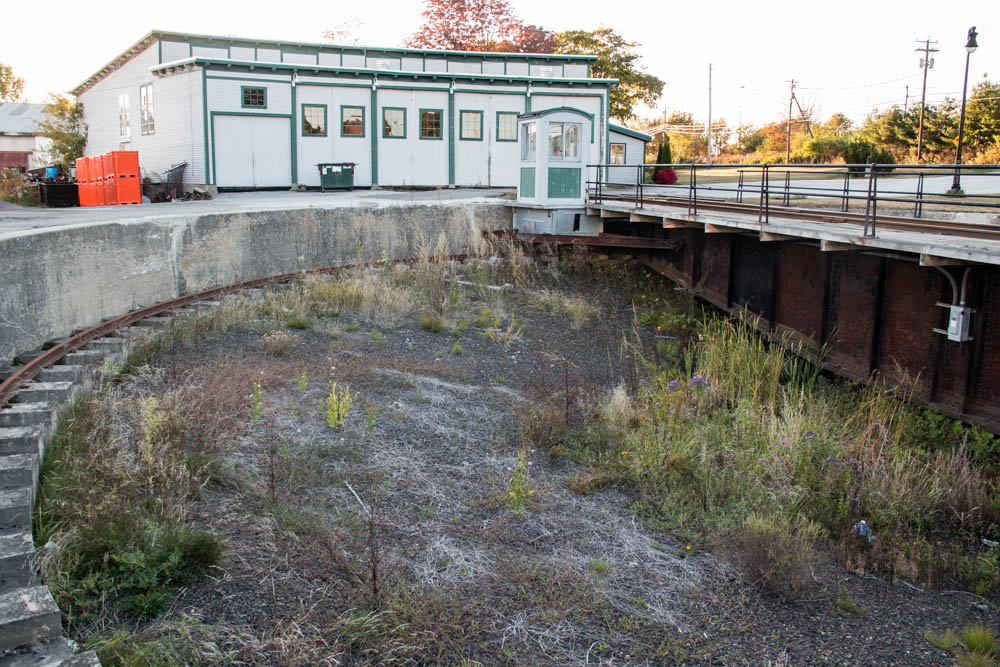

- Location within Maine Location within the United States
- Location: Park Street west of Rockland Railroad Station, Rockland, Maine
- Coordinates: 44°6′4″N 69°7′23″W
- Area: 2 acres (0.81 ha)
- Built: 1921
- NRHP reference No.: 90001953
- Added to NRHP: June 24, 1993

The Rockland Turntable and Engine House are a historic railroad maintenance facility in Rockland, Maine. The turntable and engine house were built in 1921, and are a significant reminder of the railroad's historic importance to the development of the city. The facilities were listed on the National Register of Historic Places on June 24, 1993.

== Description and history ==
The Rockland Turntable and Engine House are located about 0.5 miles (0.80 km) west of the city's downtown, in the former rail yard sandwiched between Park Street (United States Route 1) and New Country Road. The engine house is a wedge-shaped wood frame building, two stories in height, with a flat roof, clapboard siding, and a concrete foundation. on the inner (east-facing) side of the wedge there are five entry bays, four of which retain track-mounted doors. The front portion of the building is only one story, with the rear having an elevated roof with monitor-style windows overlooking the front.

The turntable is about 100 feet (30 m) east of the engine house. It is 50 feet (15 m) in diameter, consisting of a steel deck mounted on a central pier and topped by wooden decking. The outer portion of the turntable rests on a rail attached to the concrete retaining wall that encircles the structure. A small operator's shed stands at the western edge of the turntable.

These facilities were built in 1921, as a replacement for older structures. Because Rockland was at the end of the line, a turntable was built here in 1871, not long after service began on the line. The present turntable and engine house are the only known structures in the state to survive in this state of preservation.

== Gallery ==
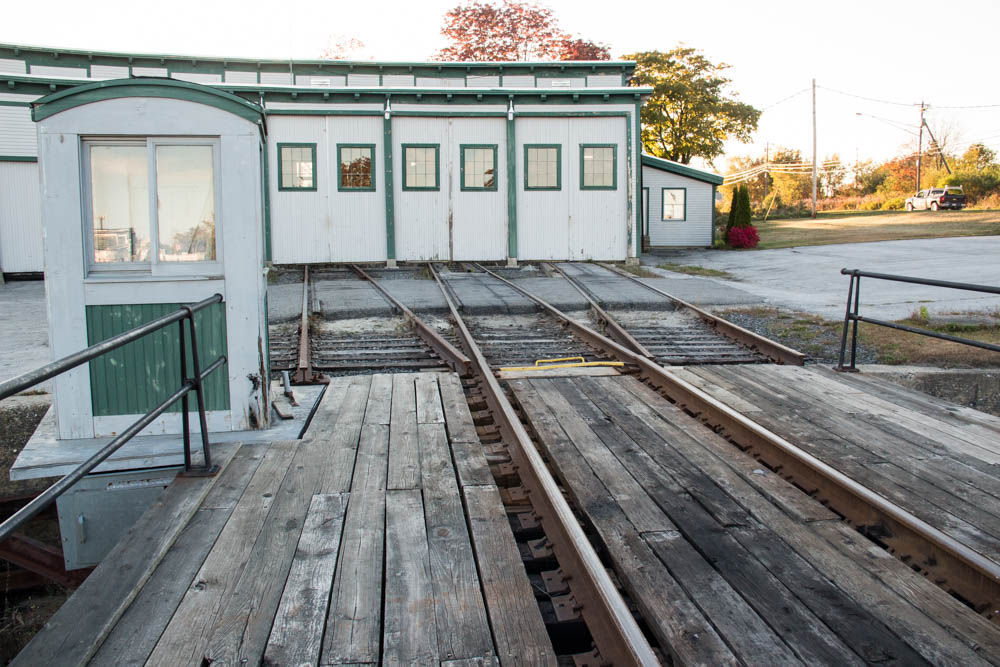
Closer view of the engine house

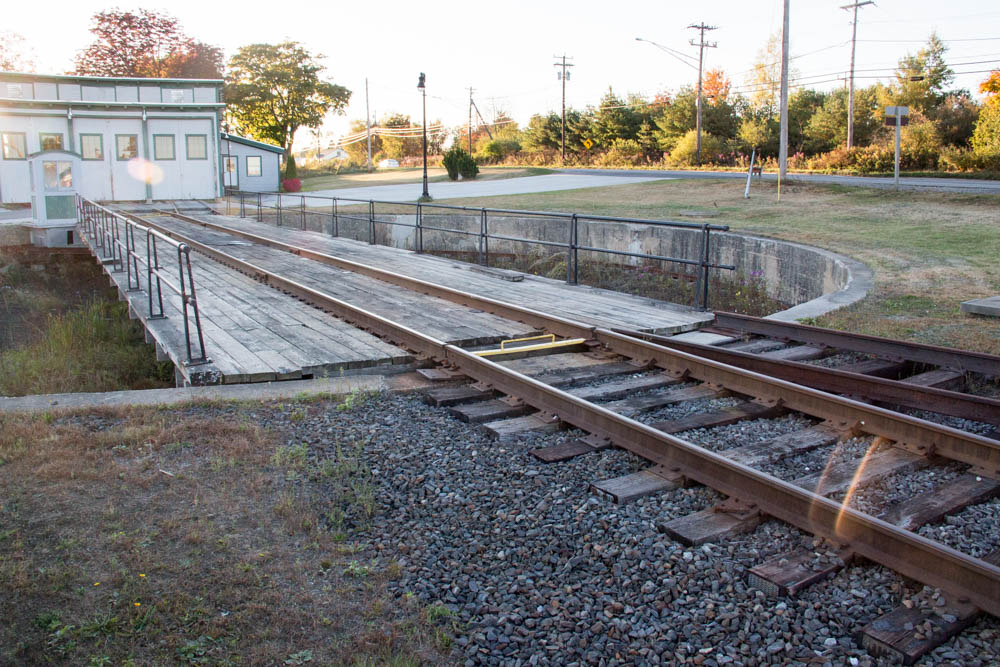
Closer view of the turntable

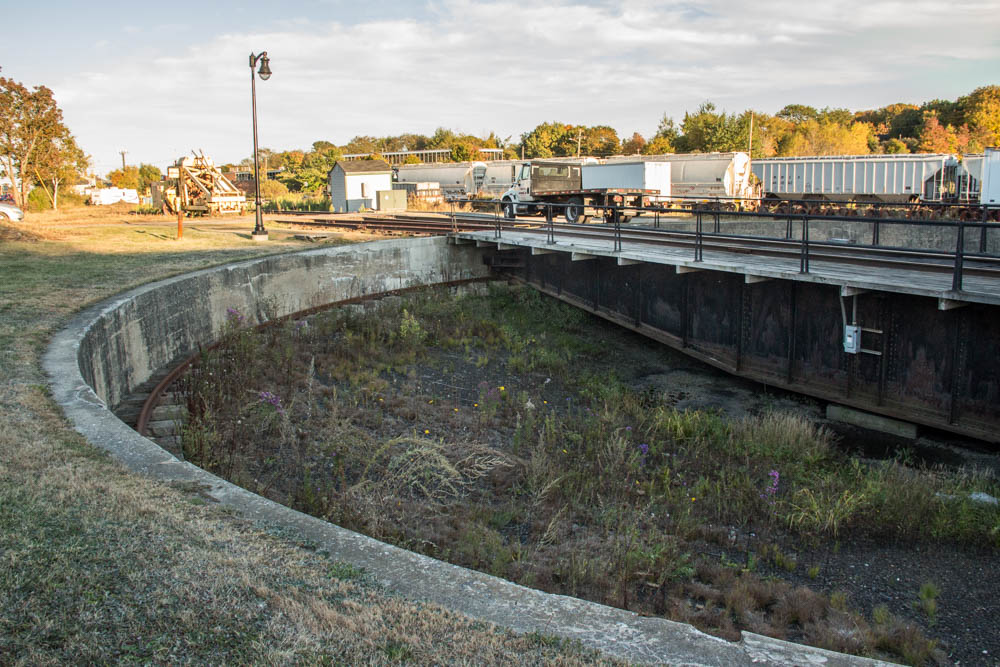
Another view of the turntable

== See also ==
- Conway Junction Railroad Turntable Site, where only foundations survive
- National Register of Historic Places listings in Knox County, Maine
