= Baltimore and Ohio Railroad Martinsburg Shops =

- U.S. National Register of Historic Places
- U.S. National Historic Landmark
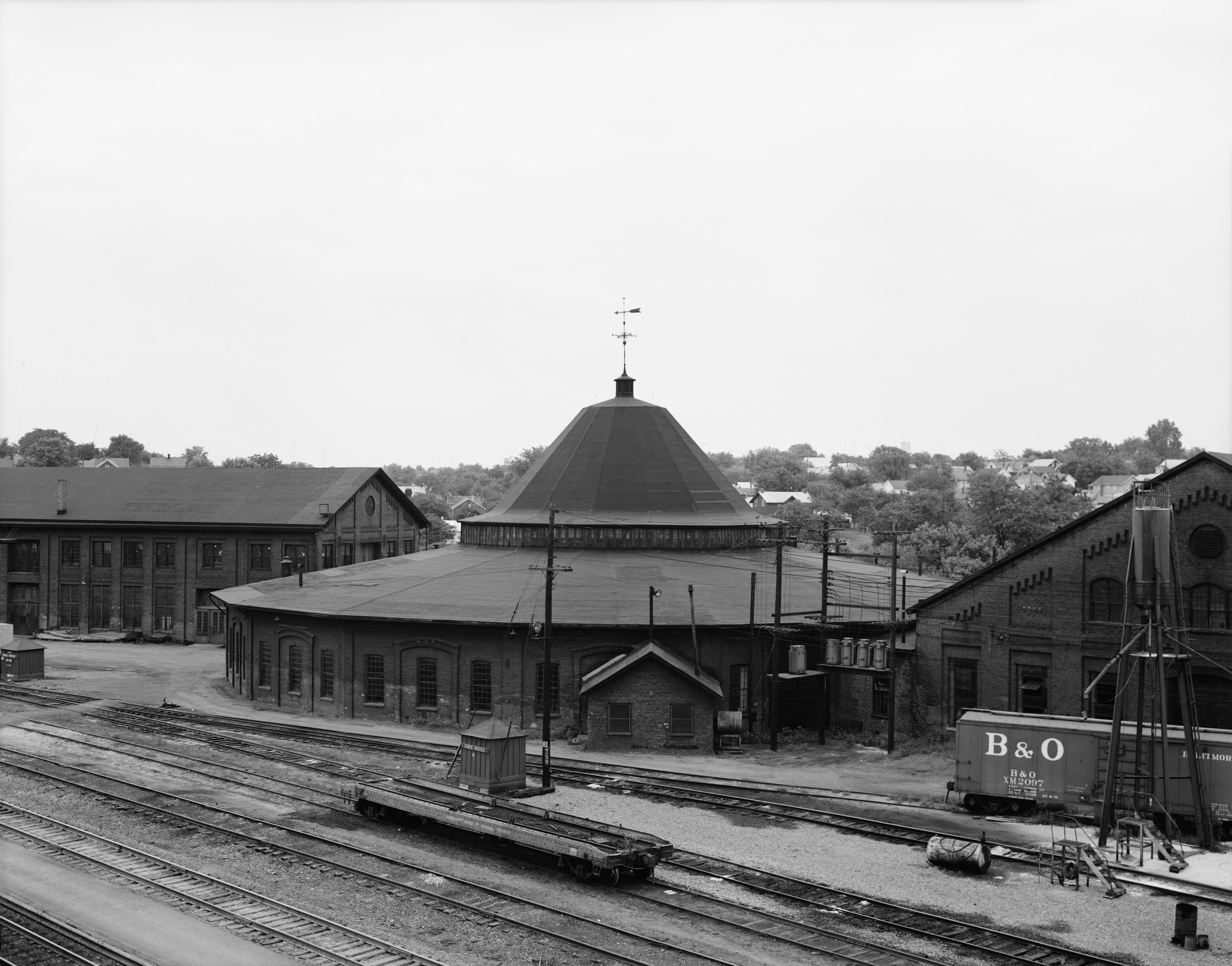
- B&O Martinsburg West Roundhouse

- Location within West Virginia Location within the United States
- Location: 300 East Martin Street, Martinsburg, West Virginia
- Coordinates: 39°27′33″N 77°57′36″W
- Area: 3 acres (1.2 ha)
- Built: 1866
- Architect: Albert Fink; Johann Niernsee
- NRHP reference No.: 03001045

Significant dates
- Added to NRHP: July 31, 2003
- Designated NHL: July 31, 2003

Baltimore and Ohio Railroad Martinsburg Shops is a historic industrial district in Martinsburg, West Virginia. It is significant both for its railroading architecture by Albert Fink and John Rudolph Niernsee and for its role in the Great Railroad Strike of 1877. It consists of three contributing buildings, one of which is the oldest covered roundhouse in the United States. The presence of the Baltimore and Ohio Railroad Company in Martinsburg dates back to the late 1840s, when the first engine and machine shops were erected for the expanding company.

The shops were designated a National Historic Landmark and placed on the National Register of Historic Places in 2003. They are now managed by a local authority as an event venue.

== Antebellum history ==
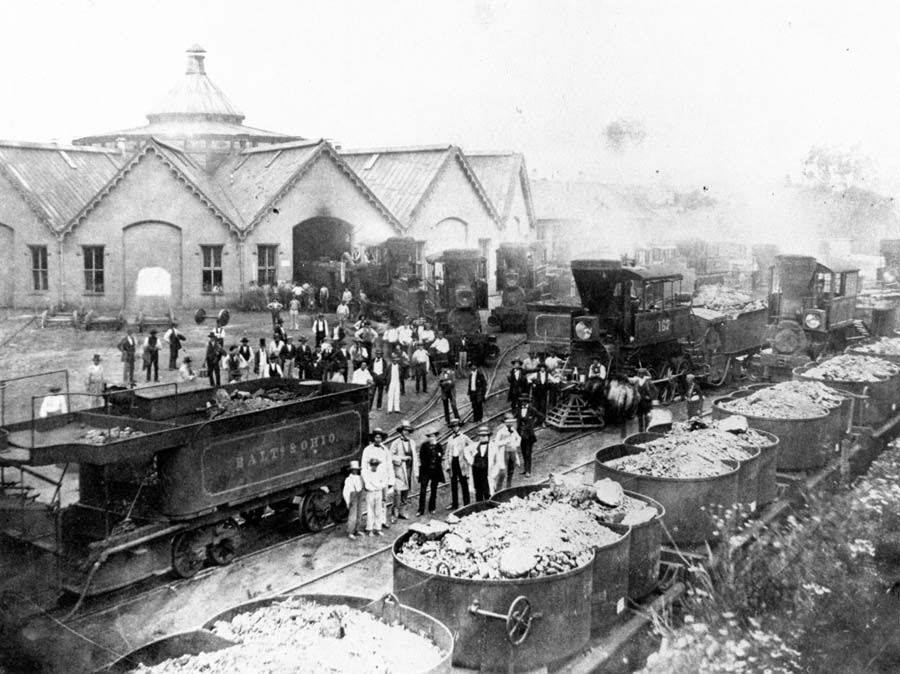
B&O's Martinsburg Shops, circa 1858

The Baltimore and Ohio Railroad (B&O) was founded on February 28, 1827. On May 21, 1842, the first steam locomotive arrived in Martinsburg and, later that same year, November 10, the first passenger train. The first roundhouse complex was constructed during 1848–1850.

== Civil War history ==
When Virginia seceded from the Union in 1861, the region's social and government institutions were thrown in turmoil. The Civil War decimated both the region and Martinsburg, specifically because of the railroad yards. On May 22, 1861, Thomas "Stonewall" Jackson's troops stopped all trains going east at Martinsburg and Point of Rocks during the Great Train Raid of 1861. Once he determined that all of the trains that could be caught were in his trap, he blew up the bridges to the west and blew down rocks onto the tracks to the east, and pirating of the B&O equipment began. In total, 42 locomotives and 386 cars were stolen and destroyed, while 36 1/2 miles of track, 17 bridges, 102 miles of telegraph wire, the "Colonnade" Bridge and the B&O roundhouse and machine shops were also destroyed.

On October 19, 1862, the roundhouse complex was burned by Confederate troops under Colonel Jackson.

== Postbellum history ==
In 1866, the B&O began reconstruction of the site. From 1866 to 1872, the present roundhouse complex was re-built. Other major buildings that were built at this time were the West Roundhouse, East Roundhouse, Bridge & Machine Shop, and the Frog & Switch Shop.

On July 16, 1877, the first nationwide strike, the Great Railroad Strike of 1877, began when rail workers at Martinsburg started an action to protest pay cuts. After several unsuccessful attempts to quell the protests, Governor Henry M. Mathews called for federal troops. By the time these troops had restored order, the protest of the rail company had spread across the country.

== Modern history ==
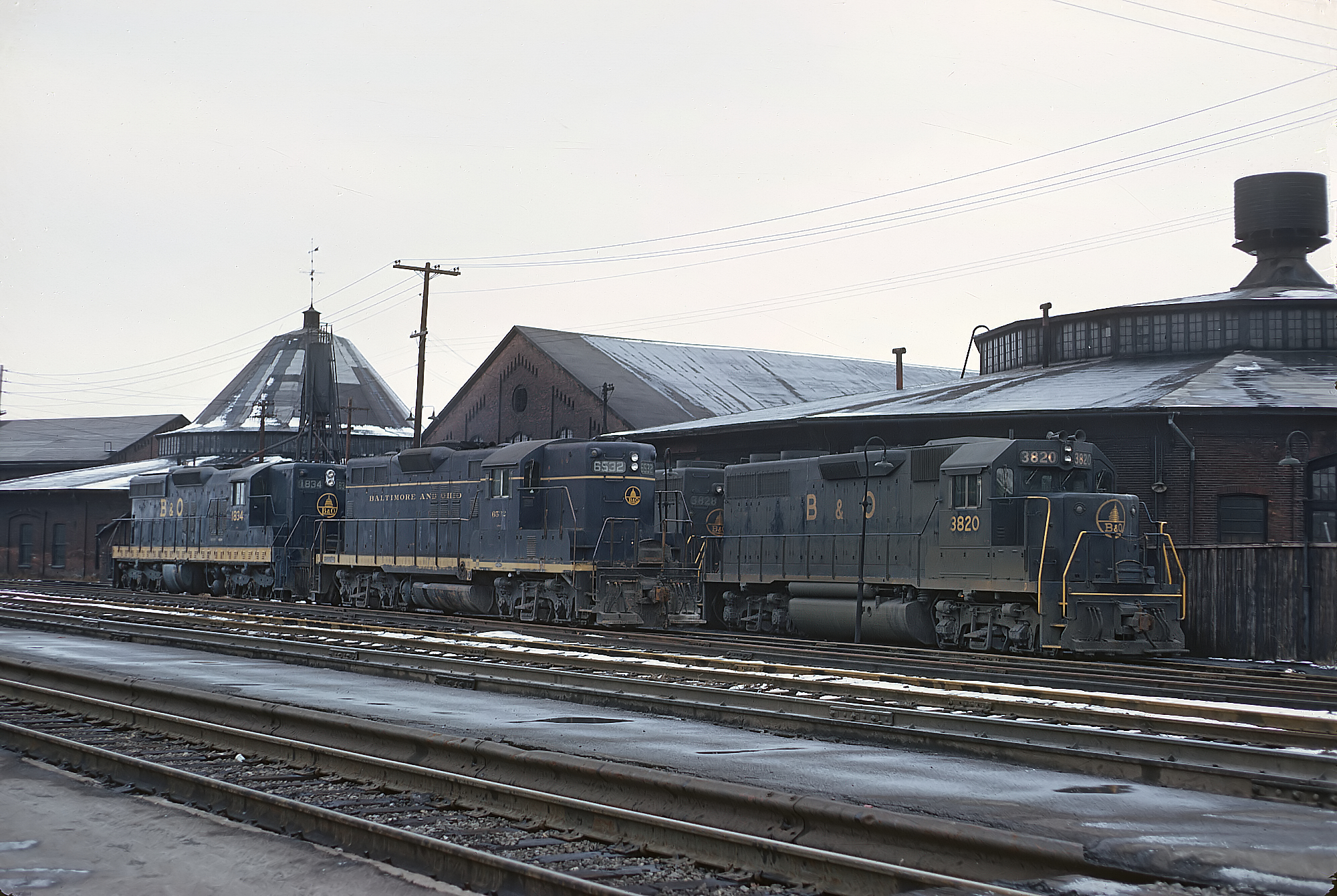
B&O engines alongside the shops in Martinsburg, W.Va. on March 2, 1969

The Martinsburg shops were used until March 14, 1988 (a year after the B&O folded into CSX), when all local operations were transferred to other locations. On May 14, 1990, vandals set fire to wooden pallets in the East Roundhouse, nearly destroying the building. Only portions of the outer walls remain standing.

The Berkeley County Commission purchased the historic railroad property in February 1999 for $150,000 from CSX Transportation Inc. The property was transferred to the Berkeley County Roundhouse Authority in April 2000. The roundhouse authority, a public, nonprofit corporation was established by an act of the West Virginia Legislature in 1999. Efforts to preserve and redevelop the historic railroad site, which dates to the 1840s, is ongoing, but the buildings are open for public tours and can be rented for special events.

In 2001, the shop complex was designated as a National Historic Civil Engineering Landmark by the American Society of Civil Engineers. On July 31, 2003, the B&O Roundhouse was designated a National Historic Landmark and was placed on the National Register of Historic Places.

== See also ==
- List of National Historic Landmarks in West Virginia
- List of railway roundhouses
- National Register of Historic Places listings in Berkeley County, West Virginia
