= AT & SF Roundhouse =

- U.S. National Register of Historic Places
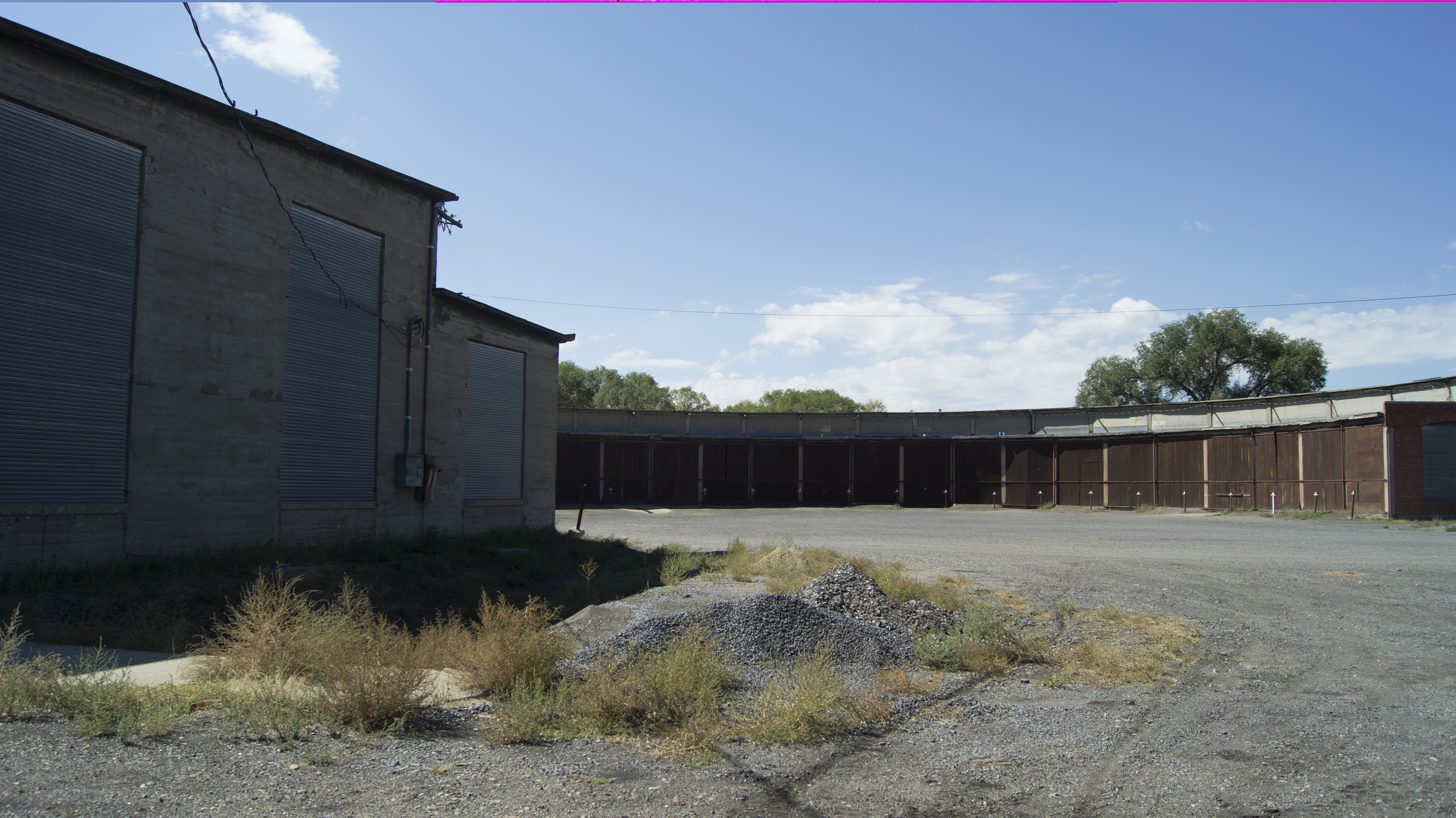

- Location within New Mexico
- Location: NE of Grand Ave., Las Vegas, New Mexico
- Coordinates: 35°35′12″N 105°12′53″W
- Area: 2 acres (0.81 ha)
- Built: 1917
- MPS: Las Vegas New Mexico MRA
- NRHP reference No.: 85002621
- Added to NRHP: September 26, 1985

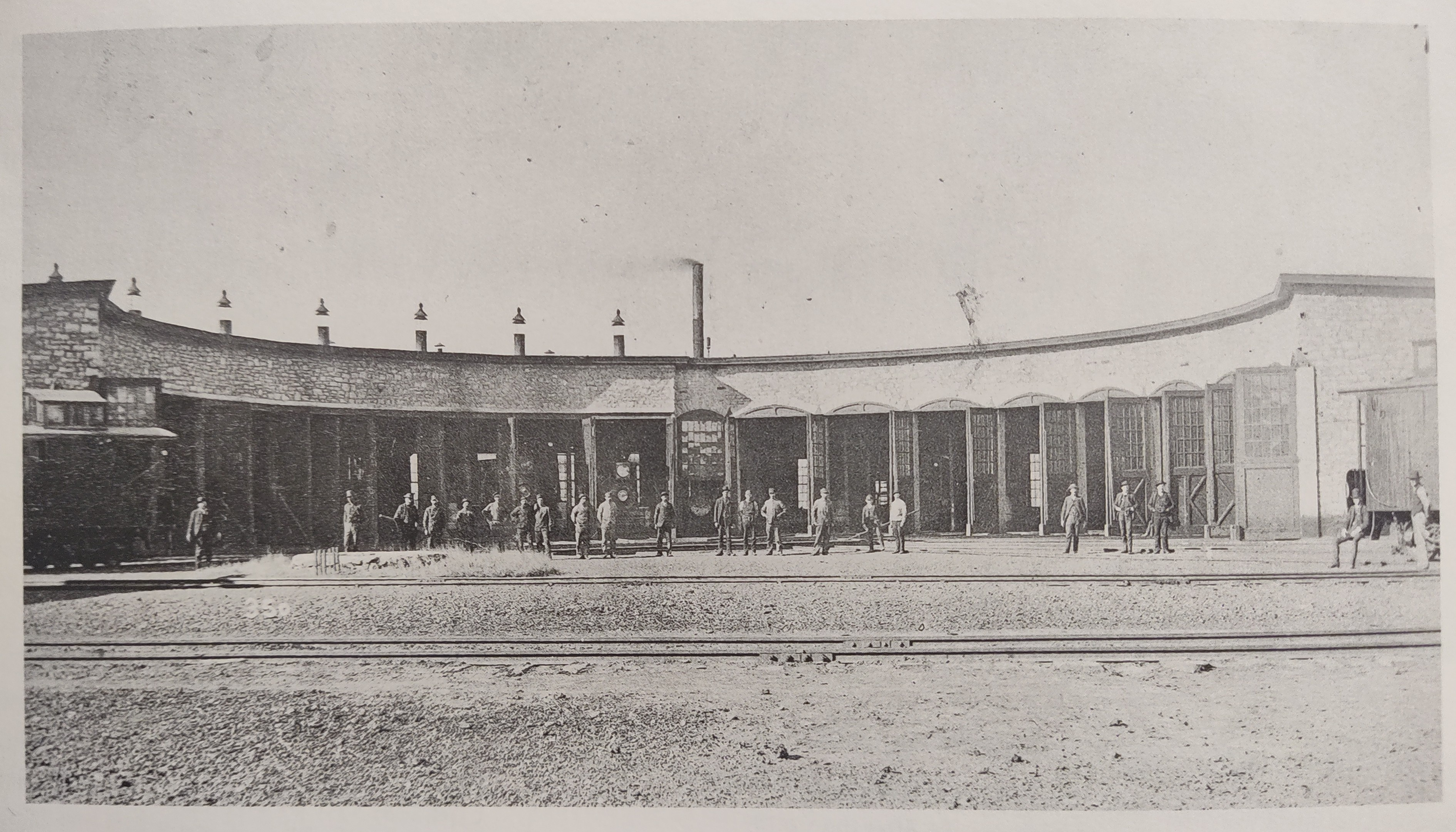

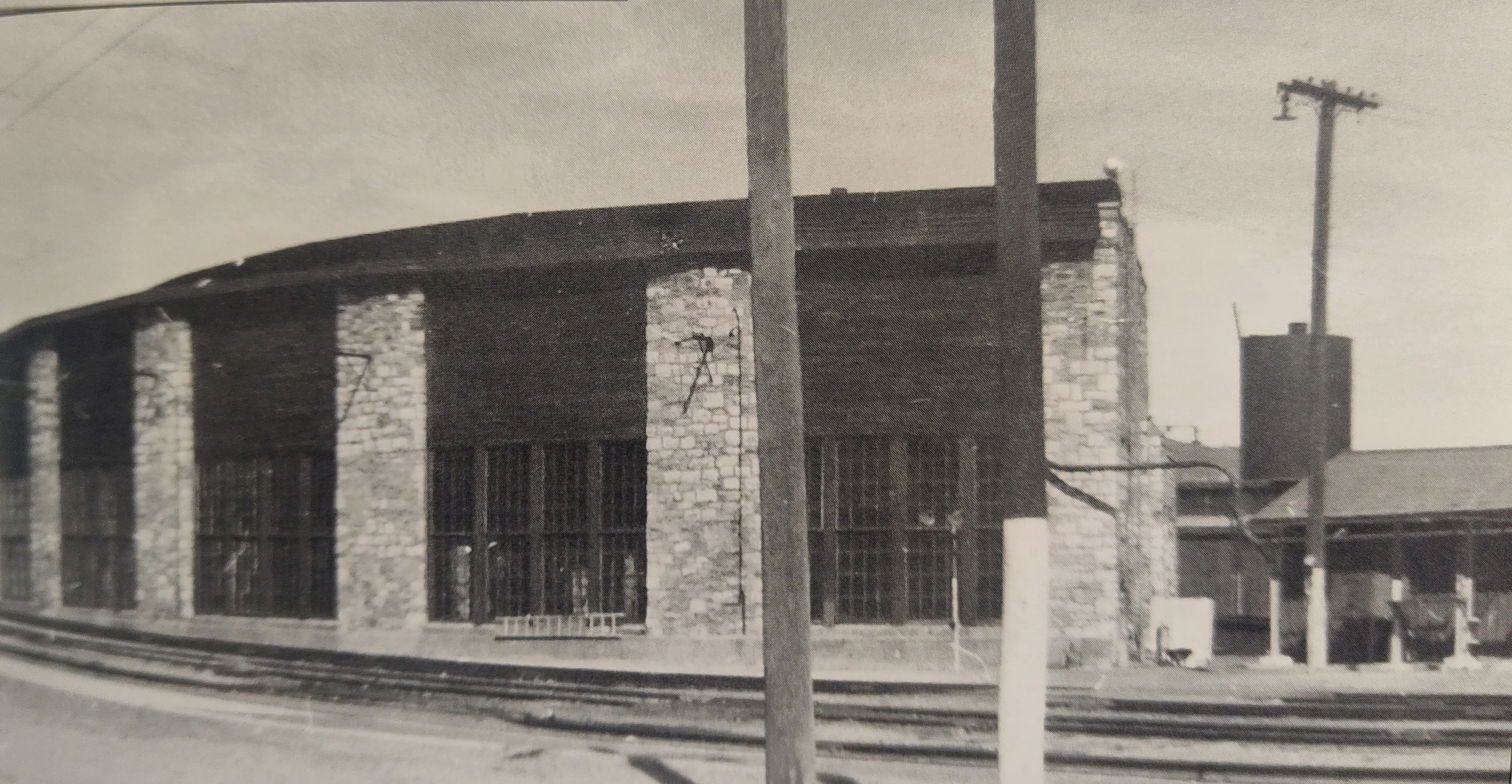

The A.T. & S.F. Roundhouse in Las Vegas, New Mexico, located at the corner of Grande ave. and Prince st. was built in 1917. It was listed on the National Register of Historic Places in 1985.

The First Las Vegas roundhouse would begin construction in August 1879, and finish just one year after the A.T.& S.F. connected to the Las Vegas Terminal. The building, which had a low-style roundhouse design would begin its life with accommodations for at least seven engines in total for storage and general maintenance. In September 1881 just one year after its installation, four additional stalls were added to the roundhouse for carpentry and rolling stock repair. A new 54' turntable was installed. An additional wing on the roundhouse was built large enough to contain nine more engines and between 1897 and 1899, a 60-foot turntable was installed. The roundhouse would ultimately end its days at twenty stalls in total.

Due to the increased size of locomotives, it became necessary for the A.T.& S.F. to rebuild the turntable to 85' in March 1904. Demand for better infrastructure and presumed work increase, the railroad would demolish the original roundhouse in favor of larger work space. The building was destroyed by fire on August 6, 1917, and replaced with a 34 Stall roundhouse with a reinforced concrete structure. This new and improved roundhouse would bill a whopping $200,000 in improvement costs to the Atchison, Topeka, and Santa Fe railroad. Calculated with inflation in 2023, the improvement would cost 5.6 million dollars. The original turntable would remain but would shortly after be upgraded to 100' for even larger engines. This still was not enough, so the WYE track for the Hot Springs lead was used to turn engines around instead, creating a bottleneck for the use of the roundhouse.

It would not be long before news of layoffs and job cuts littered the Las Vegas Optics. Only four years after the 34 Stall roundhouse was built, in 1921, many families who relied on the railroad, would be short of income and seeking other opportunity. At its peak, the roundhouse would have over 380 trainmen working three shifts from boilermakers, car repair, welders, and fabricators. A recent survey done in 2019 by the NRHS states that the building is in a "deteriorated" condition. The building since has offered storage opportunities from alleged turkey farms, wool companies, truck storage, and other agricultural ventures.
