= Kansas City Terminal Railway Company Roundhouse Historic District =

- U.S. National Register of Historic Places
- U.S. Historic district
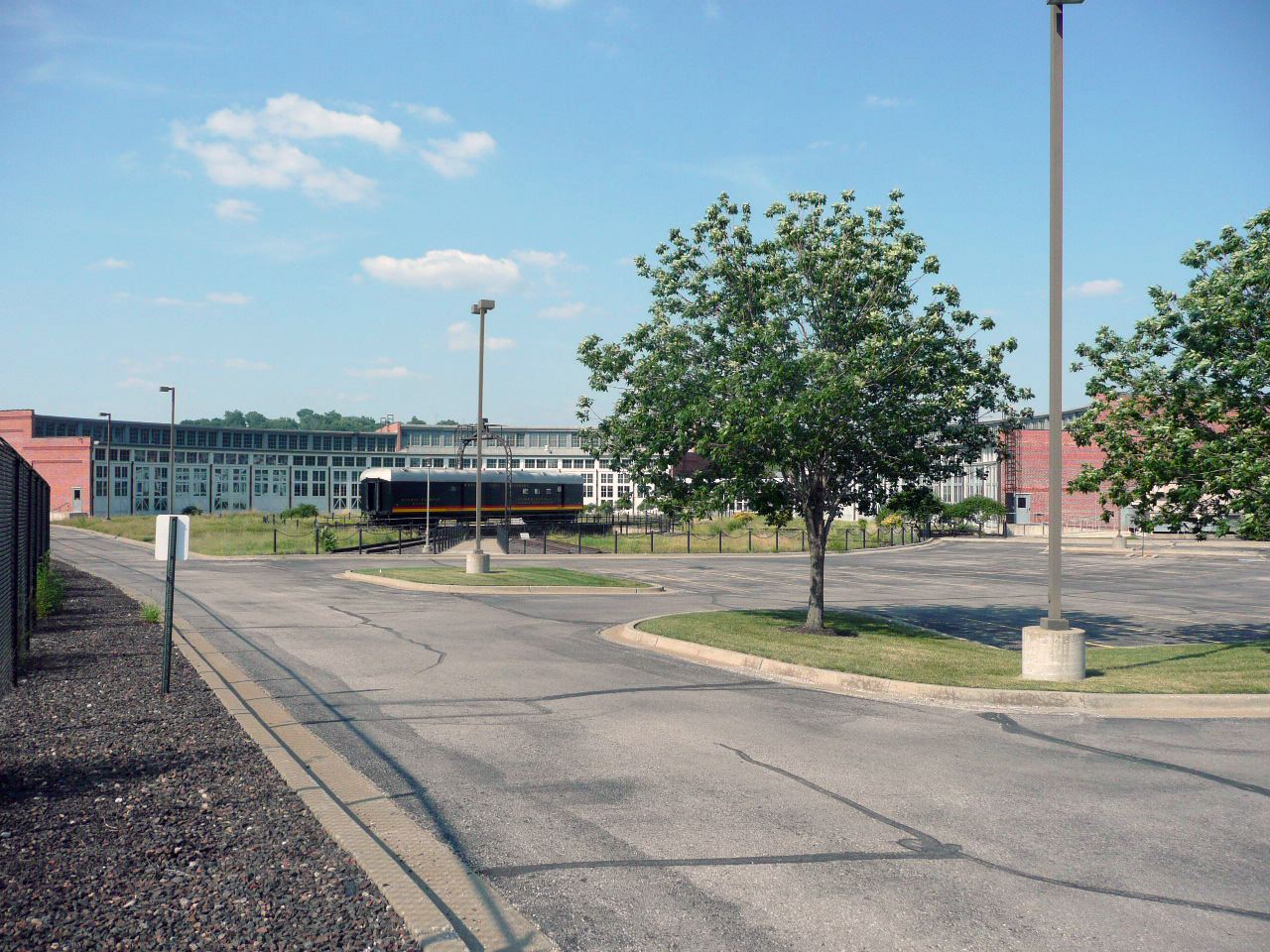

- Location within Missouri Location within the United States
- Location: Jct. of 27th St. and Southwest Blvd., Kansas City, Missouri
- Coordinates: 39°04′46″N 94°36′04″W
- Area: 22 acres (8.9 ha)
- Built: 1914
- Architect: Hanna, John
- Architectural style: Railroad design
- NRHP reference No.: 00001682
- Added to NRHP: January 26, 2001

The Kansas City Terminal Railway Company Roundhouse Historic District, in Kansas City, Missouri, is a historic district which was listed on the National Register of Historic Places in 2001. The listing included four contributing buildings, two contributing structures, and a contributing sites.

It is a 22 acres (8.9 ha) complex.
