= Okrąglak roundhouse in Piła =

Coordinates: 53°08′33″N 16°45′08″E

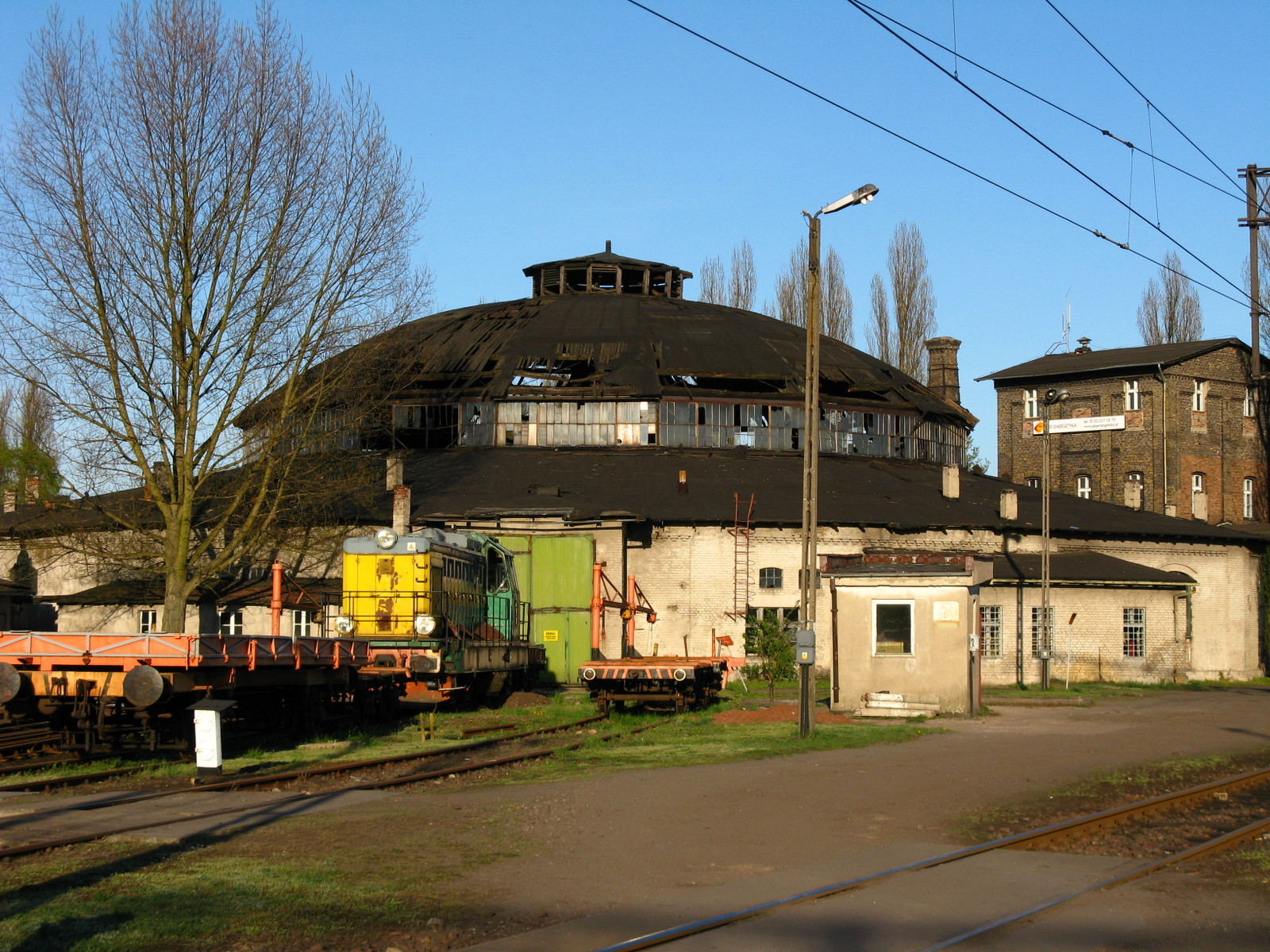
Okrąglak roundhouse in Piła

The Okrąglak roundhouse in Piła, Poland, dates from the period 1870–1874, and is related to intensive development of railways in Prussia. This particular roundhouse became standard for buildings of the same type in Europe thanks to application of atypical architectural solutions. It went out of regular use in the 1990s.

== Restoration ==
A group of citizens of Piła undertook the task to rescue the roundhouse. They intend to make it a tourist showplace through the restoration of railway functions. They also created the concept of utilization of roundhouse in Pila. The group society encourages private and public entities to cooperate in that matter to preserve the roundhouse for future generations.
