= Conway Junction Railroad Turntable Site =

- U.S. National Register of Historic Places
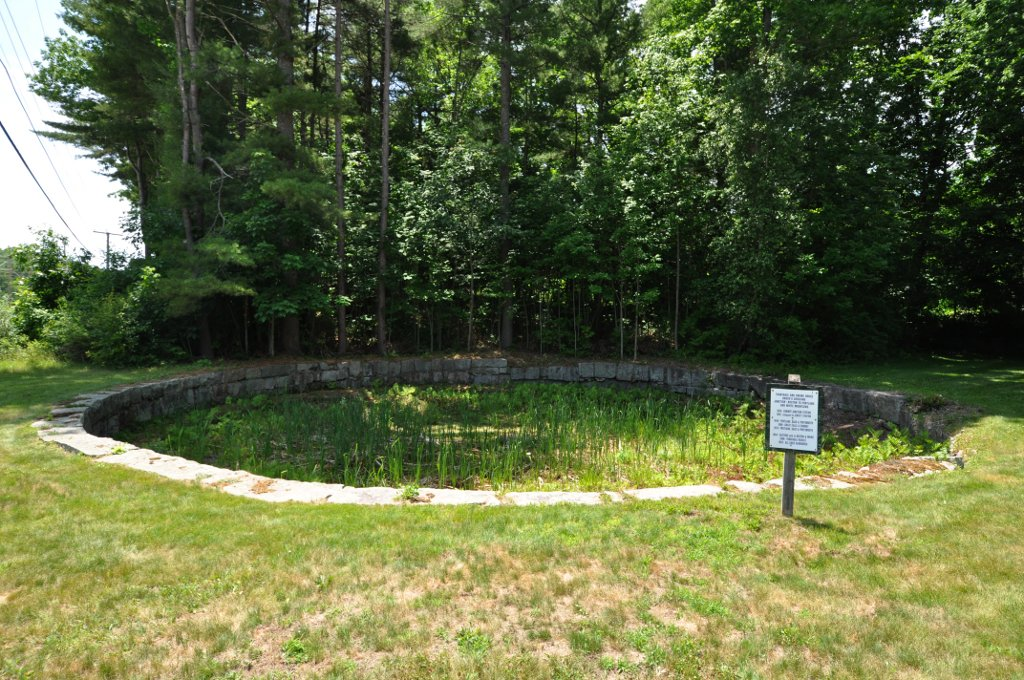

- Location within Maine Location within the United States
- Nearest city: South Berwick, Maine
- Coordinates: 43°12′33″N 70°47′22″W
- Area: less than one acre
- Built: 1855
- Architectural style: Railroad Turntable
- NRHP reference No.: 88003001
- Added to NRHP: January 5, 1989

The Conway Junction Railroad Turntable Site is the foundational remnants of what was once a major railroad junction in South Berwick, Maine. Consisting of a circular granite railroad turntable foundation and an engine house foundation, it is the only major surviving reminder of Great Falls and South Berwick Railroad. The site was listed on the National Register of Historic Places in 1989.

== Description and history ==
The turntable site is located at the southwest corner of Fife's Lane and Maine State Route 236, south of the village center of South Berwick. The turntable foundation is a circular structure about 60 feet (18 m) in diameter with an interior depth of about 2 feet (0.61 m) below grade. At the center is a granite pier, capped with concrete, on which the turntable was originally mounted. To the west of this structure is a three-sided granite foundation, which once supported a wedge-shaped engine house (a roundhouse). The turntable is believed to date to 1855.

The first railroad that came to South Berwick was the Portland, Saco and Portsmouth Railroad (PS&P), in 1842. The Boston and Maine Railroad (B&M) extended its line eastward from Exeter, New Hampshire in 1843, meeting the PS&P in South Berwick village. The Great Falls and South Berwick Railroad in about 1855 built a 3.0-mile (4.8 km) spur line from the PS&P at this point to join with the B&M at Great Falls, and established its headquarters here, which became known as Conway Junction because the Great Falls and South Berwick connected near here to the Portsmouth, Great Falls and Conway Railroad with service to Conway, New Hampshire. The rail lines in this area were used until 1936, and abandoned in 1941. Route 236 was built over the PS&P right of way in the 1940s, around which time the turntable and engine house were dismantled, and the Great Falls and South Berwick right of way was also built over. The foundations here are the only tangible remnants of this history.

== See also ==
- National Register of Historic Places listings in York County, Maine
