= Charles Stanley (Wisconsin politician) =

19th century American politician

Charles A. Stanley

Member of the Wisconsin State Assembly from the Chippewa 1st district
- In office January 7, 1895 – January 2, 1899
- Preceded by: John Harmon
- Succeeded by: Lycurgus J. Rusk

24th Mayor of Chippewa Falls, Wisconsin
- In office April 1895 – April 1896
- Preceded by: Owen E. Lappin
- Succeeded by: Philo H. Lindley

Personal details
- Born: May 3, 1849 Baraboo, Wisconsin, U.S.
- Died: June 2, 1908 (aged 59) Boyd, Wisconsin, U.S.
- Party: Republican
- Spouse: Georgia Anna Mann (m. 1870–1908)
- Children: 9

Charles Augusta Stanley (May 3, 1849 – June 2, 1908) was an American businessman and Republican politician from Chippewa Falls, Wisconsin. He was the 24th mayor of Chippewa Falls, and served two terms in the Wisconsin State Assembly (1895–1899).

== Biography ==
Charles Stanley was born in Baraboo, Wisconsin, in 1849. He was educated in the common schools at Baraboo and attended the University of Wisconsin.

He came to Chippewa County, Wisconsin, with his father in 1870, where they operated a saw mill. He made his permanent home at Chippewa Falls, Wisconsin, in 1883. Shortly after settling in Chippewa Falls, he and his father purchased a small sash and door factory, which he developed into a major employer in the city, under the firm name F. G. & C. A. Stanley.

He was elected to the Chippewa Falls city council in 1885 and was re-elected in 1886 and 1887, also serving on the county board those years. In 1888 he was the Republican nominee for mayor of Chippewa Falls, but narrowly lost the election to the incumbent mayor Alexander B. McDonnell.

He was appointed president of the Chippewa Falls board of bonding commissioners in 1892 and was reappointed for a four-year term in 1894. Later that year, he made his first run for Wisconsin State Assembly. He won the general election with 42% of the vote, defeating Democrat James Andrew Taylor and populist George B. Horwood. The next year, he ran again for mayor as an incumbent state representative. Facing Alexander B. McDonnell again in the general election, this time Stanley prevailed by about 100 votes. He did not run for re-election as mayor in the spring of 1896, but won another term in the State Assembly in the fall, receiving 52% of the vote. He did not run for a third term in 1898.

On June 2, 1908, he took his wife and two daughters on an automobile ride in the county. After arriving at Boyd, Wisconsin, he complained of not feeling well and went to his hotel room at the Commercial Hotel. Medical help was soon summoned, but he died before the doctor arrived.

Wisconsin State Assembly
Preceded by John Harmon	Member of the Wisconsin State Assembly from the Chippewa 1st district January 7, 1895 – January 2, 1899	Succeeded by Lycurgus J. Rusk
Political offices
Preceded by Owen E. Lappin	Mayor of Chippewa Falls, Wisconsin; April 1895 – April 1896	Succeeded by Philo H. Lindley
