= Bridge Street Historic District =

Bridge Street Historic District can refer to:

- Bridge Street Historic District (Westport, Connecticut), listed on the NRHP in Connecticut
- Bridge Street Historic District (Las Vegas, New Mexico), listed on the National Register of Historic Places (NRHP) in New Mexico
- Bridge Street Historic District (Montgomery, New York), listed on the NRHP in New York
- Bridge Street Commercial Historic District, Chippewa Falls, Wisconsin, listed on the NRHP in Wisconsin
