= Thomas Cunningham (Wisconsin politician) =

American politician (1852–1941)

Thomas J. Cunningham
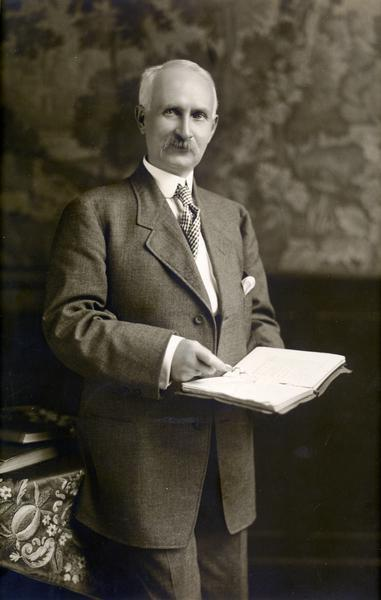

14th Secretary of State of Wisconsin
- In office January 5, 1891 – January 7, 1895
- Governor: George Wilbur Peck
- Preceded by: Ernst Timme
- Succeeded by: Henry Casson

15th and 28th Mayor of Chippewa Falls, Wisconsin
- In office April 1899 – April 1901
- Preceded by: J. A. Anderson
- Succeeded by: L. A. Fletcher
- In office April 1885 – April 1886
- Preceded by: Jacob Leinenkugel
- Succeeded by: Hector McRae

Member of the Wisconsin State Assembly from the Chippewa district
- In office January 3, 1887 – January 7, 1889
- Preceded by: Henry J. Goddard
- Succeeded by: Benjamin Franklin Millard

Personal details
- Born: March 17, 1852 Brooklyn, New York, U.S.
- Died: April 28, 1941 (aged 89) Rochester, Minnesota, U.S.
- Resting place: Forest Hill Cemetery, Chippewa Falls, Wisconsin
- Party: Democratic
- Children: Mrs. John Parks; Mrs. A. J. Lobb; Carl J. Cunningham; ^{born 1888; died 1920}

Thomas Jefferson Cunningham (March 17, 1852 – April 28, 1941) was an American newspaper publisher, historian, and politician. He was the 14th Secretary of State of Wisconsin, and served three years as mayor of Chippewa Falls, Wisconsin. He was a prominent member of the Democratic Party of Wisconsin and was a delegate to every Democratic National Convention from 1880 and 1940. In his role as Secretary of State, he was the namesake for a set of Wisconsin Supreme Court decisions, known as the "Cunningham cases", which set legal standards in the state for redistricting.

== Biography ==
Born in Brooklyn, New York, as a child he moved with his parents to New Haven, Connecticut, where he was educated in the common schools. He was orphaned at a young age; he came to Wisconsin in 1869 and settled at Stoughton, in Dane County. Shortly after arriving, he worked at the Black Earth Advertiser, and then moved to Madison to work for the Wisconsin Democrat. Through his association with the paper, he became acquainted with many of the prominent Democratic leaders in the state.

From 1873 to 1875, he was employed as a clerk in the office of the Secretary of State of Wisconsin. But in 1875, he moved north to Chippewa Falls, Wisconsin, where he returned to journalism. He started a Democratic partisan paper in the county, which was—at that time—a Republican stronghold. Cunningham was the co-owner and editor of the Chippewa Times and its successor, the daily Independent, through at least 1919—except for the years he served as Secretary of State. It was remarked that his paper was the first Democratic paper to endure in this county.

Cunningham was elected to three terms as Mayor of Chippewa Falls, in 1885, 1899, and 1900. And in 1886 was elected to represent all of Chippewa County in the Wisconsin State Assembly. Cunningham became an influential member of the Democratic Party of Wisconsin representing the Democrats of the "up north" counties, and was elected as a state delegate to every Democratic National Convention from 1880 through 1940.

In 1890, Cunningham was chosen by the State Democratic Convention as the party's nominee for Secretary of State in the fall election. Cunningham was chosen on the second ballot, as the convention crowd chanted his name. In the general election, Cunningham defeated Republican candidate Edwin D. Coe with 53% of the vote. Cunningham was subsequently re-elected in 1892, but defeated seeking a third term in 1894. He was succeeded by Republican Henry Casson.

After leaving office, Cunningham returned to his newspaper, working until at least 1919. In his later years, he served on several appointed state commissions, including the Civil Service Commission, the State Forestry Commission, and the State Oil Commission. He also became active in works of history; he was a co-author of West Central Wisconsin: A History, and became a curator at the Wisconsin Historical Society.

He attended his last Democratic Convention in 1940, voting for the renomination of Franklin D. Roosevelt for a third term as President. He died less than a year later.

== Cunningham redistricting cases ==
Cunningham was part of a Democratic sweep of all the statewide elected offices in the 1890 elections, which also saw Democrats gain full control of the state legislature. This was the first time the Democrats held such power in the state since before the American Civil War, and it occurred in a redistricting year. What followed was one of Wisconsin's first major redistricting controversies, to which Cunningham's name is closely associated.

In May 1891, Governor Peck signed the Democratic redistricting plans, 1891 Wisc. Act 482 and 1891 Wisc. Act 483. Throughout the legislative process of developing the maps, Republicans expressed outrage at what they saw as a partisan gerrymander. As Secretary of State, Cunningham was legally responsible for implementing the new maps, but, in February 1892, a suit was related to the Wisconsin Supreme Court to bar Cunningham from acting on the maps and to strike down the legislation. The Court published its opinion on March 22, 1892, agreeing with the Republican position and striking down the redistricting act. Justice Harlow S. Orton wrote for the majority that: (1) the maps did not properly account for the population of non-taxed Native Americans and members of the Army and Navy who were not currently located in the state; (2) the districts did not closely adhere to county lines; and that districts were not properly (3) contiguous, (4) compact, and (5) convenient. The court also found that the districts varied too widely in population, with the most populous Senate district being nearly twice the population of the smallest.

The Legislature subsequently made another attempt at redistricting, which was also struck down by the Wisconsin Supreme Court. A third and final version was passed only 12 days before the 1892 election.

The principles articulated by the Wisconsin Supreme Court in these cases—adherence to county lines; contiguity; compactness; convenience; striving for population uniformity—collectively became known in the state as the "Cunningham Principles" for redistricting, and were closely considered for decades of subsequent redistricting measures.

== Personal life and family ==
Cunningham was popular and well-liked among the public and the political class in Wisconsin. He was a personal friend of U.S. Senator Robert M. "Fighting Bob" La Follette, leader of the Progressive Republicans.

Cunningham and his wife had three children, though their son, Carl, died at about 32 years of age. He was survived by two daughters.

After his death, William J. O'Neil, the son of a friend—William O'Neil—composed a poem about him.

== Electoral history ==
=== Wisconsin Assembly (1884, 1886) ===
Wisconsin Assembly, Chippewa District Election, 1884
Party	Candidate	Votes	%	±%
General Election, November 4, 1884
Republican	Henry J. Goddard	2,639	51.46%	+33.36%
Democratic	Thomas J. Cunningham	2,489	48.54%	+5.72%
Plurality		150	2.93%	-0.81%
Total votes		5,128	100.0%	+70.99%
Republican gain from Democratic				

Wisconsin Assembly, Chippewa District Election, 1886
Party	Candidate	Votes	%	±%
General Election, November 2, 1886
Democratic	Thomas J. Cunningham	2,506	54.31%	+5.78%
Republican	W. W. Potter	1,780	38.58%	−12.88%
Prohibition	Perry Hopkins	328	7.11%	
Plurality		726	15.73%	+12.81%
Total votes		4,614	100.0%	-10.02%
Democratic gain from Republican				

=== Wisconsin Secretary of State (1890, 1892, 1894) ===
Wisconsin Secretary of State Election, 1890
Party	Candidate	Votes	%	±%
General Election, November 4, 1890
Democratic	Thomas J. Cunningham	160,493	52.77%	+9.37%
Republican	Edwin D. Coe	124,764	41.02%	−9.02%
Prohibition	George McKerrow	11,635	3.83%	−0.27%
Labor	William N. Lockwood	7,115	2.34%	−0.12%
	Scattering	153	0.05%	
Plurality		35,729	11.75%	+5.10%
Total votes		304,160	100.0%	-14.24%
Democratic gain from Republican				

Wisconsin Secretary of State Election, 1892
Party	Candidate	Votes	%	±%
General Election, November 8, 1892
Democratic	Thomas J. Cunningham (incumbent)	177,052	47.90%	−4.86%
Republican	Robert W. Jackson	169,718	45.92%	+4.90%
Prohibition	E. Fred Russell	13,172	3.56%	−0.26%
Populist	Aaron Broughton	9,670	2.62%	
Plurality		7,334	1.98%	-9.76%
Total votes		369,612	100.0%	+21.52%
Democratic hold				

Wisconsin Secretary of State Election, 1894
Party	Candidate	Votes	%	±%
General Election, November 6, 1894
Republican	Henry Casson	197,710	53.33%	+7.41%
Democratic	Thomas J. Cunningham (incumbent)	137,585	37.11%	−10.79%
Populist	William N. Lockwood	24,452	6.60%	+3.98%
Prohibition	George McKerrow	10,969	2.96%	−0.60%
Plurality		60,125	16.22%	+14.23%
Total votes		370,716	100.0%	+0.30%
Republican gain from Democratic				

== Works ==
- Cunningham, Thomas J., ed. (1891). The Blue Book of the State of Wisconsin (Report). State of Wisconsin.
- Cunningham, Thomas J., ed. (1893). The Blue Book of the State of Wisconsin (Report). State of Wisconsin.
- Gregory, John Goadby; Cunningham, Thomas Jefferson, eds. (1933). West Central Wisconsin: A History. S. J. Clarke Publishing Co.

Party political offices
Preceded by August C. Larson	Democratic nominee for Secretary of State of Wisconsin; 1890, 1892, 1894	Succeeded by Cyrus M. Butt
Wisconsin State Assembly
Preceded by Henry J. Goddard	Member of the Wisconsin State Assembly from the Chippewa district January 3, 1887 – January 7, 1889	Succeeded by Benjamin Franklin Millard
Political offices
Preceded by Jacob Leinenkugel	Mayor of Chippewa Falls, Wisconsin; April 1885 – April 1886	Succeeded by Hector McRae
Preceded by Ernst Timme	Secretary of State of Wisconsin; January 5, 1891 – January 7, 1895	Succeeded by Henry Casson
Preceded by J. A. Anderson	Mayor of Chippewa Falls, Wisconsin; April 1899 – April 1901	Succeeded by L. A. Fletcher
