= James Andrew Taylor =

19th century American politician

James A. Taylor

Member of the Wisconsin State Assembly from the Chippewa district
- In office January 5, 1891 – January 2, 1893
- Preceded by: Benjamin Franklin Millard
- Succeeded by: John C. Harmon
- In office January 1, 1883 – January 5, 1885
- Preceded by: William B. Bartlett^{(Chippewa–Price dist.)}
- Succeeded by: Henry J. Goddard

Member of the Wisconsin State Assembly from the Chippewa–Price district
- In office January 3, 1881 – January 2, 1882
- Preceded by: Hector McRae
- Succeeded by: William B. Bartlett

1st Mayor of Chippewa Falls, Wisconsin
- In office April 1870 – April 1871
- Preceded by: Position established
- Succeeded by: J. W. Sheldon

Personal details
- Born: September 8, 1835 Argyle, New York, U.S.
- Died: February 15, 1906 (aged 70) Portland, Oregon, U.S.
- Resting place: Milwaukie Pioneer Cemetery, Milwaukie, Oregon
- Party: Democratic
- Spouse: Mary M. Buzzell (m. 1856)
- Children: Frank A. Taylor^{(b. 1858; died 1931)}; William J. Taylor^{(b. 1860; died 1922)}; Charles Taylor^{(died in infancy)}; John J. Taylor^{(died c.1901)}
- Occupation: Merchant

James Andrew Taylor (September 8, 1835 – February 15, 1906) was an American businessman, Democratic politician, and Wisconsin pioneer. He was the first mayor of Chippewa Falls, Wisconsin, and represented Chippewa County for three terms in the Wisconsin State Assembly.

== Biography ==
James A. Taylor was born September 8, 1835, in the town of Argyle, New York. As a young man, he moved to Lansing, Iowa, then came to Chippewa Falls, Wisconsin, in 1854. He worked for the merchant company H. S. Allen & Co., clerking aboard their steamboat during the summers, and in their stores in the winters. In 1856, he formed a partnership with Fred H. Bussy to open his own general store. He served as village treasurer for two terms in 1858 and 1859.

He constructed the Gravel Island mill in 1864, which he sold to the French Lumbering Company in 1875. Chippewa Falls was incorporated as a city in 1869, and at their first election, in 1870, Taylor was chosen as mayor. In 1883, after a fire in the city destroyed the hotel, he constructed the "Taylor Block" which he operated as a new hotel for four years. The "Taylor Block" still stands today as part of the Bridge Street Commercial Historic District, in the National Register of Historic Places.

Taylor was active and loyal to the Democratic Party. He was elected on the Democratic ticket to the Wisconsin State Assembly in 1880, 1882, and 1890.

In 1902, Taylor moved west to Portland, Oregon. He died there four years later on February 15, 1906.

Wisconsin State Assembly
Preceded by Hector McRae	Member of the Wisconsin State Assembly from the Chippewa–Price district January 3, 1881 – January 2, 1882	Succeeded by William B. Bartlett
Preceded by William B. Bartlett (Chippewa–Price dist.)	Member of the Wisconsin State Assembly from the Chippewa district January 1, 1883 – January 5, 1885	Succeeded by Henry J. Goddard
Preceded by Benjamin Franklin Millard	Member of the Wisconsin State Assembly from the Chippewa district January 5, 1891 – January 2, 1893	Succeeded by John C. Harmon
Political offices
New city incorporated	Mayor of Chippewa Falls, Wisconsin; April 1870 – April 1871	Succeeded by J. W. Sheldon
