= Arthur L. Padrutt =

American politician

Member of the Public Service Commission of Wisconsin
- In office April 13, 1956 – March 1, 1975
- Governor: Walter J. Kohler Jr.; Vernon W. Thomson; Gaylord Nelson; John W. Reynolds Jr.; Warren P. Knowles; Patrick Lucey
- Preceded by: James R. Durfee
- Succeeded by: Matthew Holden

Member of the Wisconsin Senate from the 28th district
- In office January 3, 1949 – April 13, 1956
- Preceded by: George H. Hipke
- Succeeded by: Davis A. Donnelly

Member of the Wisconsin State Assembly from Chippewa County
- In office January 1941 – January 1947
- Preceded by: George H. Hipke
- Succeeded by: Sylvia H. Raihle

Personal details
- Born: Arthur Leonard Padrutt; September 26, 1917 Huron, South Dakota, U.S.
- Died: April 4, 1992 (aged 74) Madison, Wisconsin, U.S.
- Party: Progressive (until 1956); Republican (after 1956)
- Spouse: Lorraine Hickox
- Education: Eau Claire State Teachers College; University of Wisconsin

Arthur Leonard Padrutt (September 26, 1917 – April 4, 1992) was a politician in Wisconsin.

== Biography ==
Padrutt was born on September 26, 1917, in Huron, South Dakota. He later moved to Chippewa Falls, Wisconsin.

== Career ==
Padrutt was a member of the Wisconsin State Assembly from 1943 to 1944. He was elected to the Wisconsin State Senate in 1948 and was re-elected in 1952. In 1953, he was a candidate for the United States House of Representatives from Wisconsin's 9th congressional district in a special election following the death of Merlin Hull. He lost to Lester Johnson. Additionally, Padrutt was a public service commissioner. He was a Republican. He attended the University of Wisconsin-Eau Claire.
