= John Harmon (Wisconsin politician) =

19th century American politician

John C. Harmon

Member of the Wisconsin State Assembly from the Chippewa 1st district
- In office January 2, 1893 – January 7, 1895
- Preceded by: James Andrew Taylor (whole county)
- Succeeded by: Charles A. Stanley

Personal details
- Born: June 16, 1845 Wooster, Ohio, U.S.
- Died: January 22, 1921 (aged 75) Puyallup, Washington, U.S.
- Resting place: Forest Hill Cemetery, Chippewa Falls, Wisconsin
- Party: Democratic
- Spouses: Bertha Rades (died 1881); Anna Knapp (died 1895)
- Children: Cora Harmon; Frank L. Harmon; George W. Harmon; John H. Harmon

John C. Harmon (June 16, 1845 – January 22, 1921) was an American lumberman and pioneer of Wisconsin and Washington. He was a member of the Wisconsin State Assembly, representing Chippewa County during the 1893 sessions.

== Biography ==
John C. Harmon was born in June 1845 in Wooster, Ohio. As a child, he came with his parents to the Wisconsin Territory, settling in Beaver Dam in 1847. He was educated there and went to work in Chippewa County, Wisconsin, in the lumber business. He was justice of the peace and county supervisor in Chippewa County, and was elected town treasurer of the town of Big Bend in 1881 and 1882.

He then moved into the city of Chippewa Falls, Wisconsin, where he was again elected county supervisor and member of the city council. He was elected to the Wisconsin State Assembly in 1892, running on the Democratic Party ticket. He represented Chippewa County's first Assembly district, which then comprised the southwest corner of the county. He was part of a brief Democratic majority in the Legislature. His most notable contribution was likely authoring the first law to make Labor Day a holiday in Wisconsin. He was not a candidate for re-election in 1894.

He moved to Puyallup, Washington, about 1908 and resided there until his death in 1921. His body was interred at Chippewa Falls' historic Forest Hill Cemetery.

== Electoral history ==
=== Wisconsin Assembly (1892) ===
Wisconsin Assembly, Chippewa 1st District Election, 1892
Party	Candidate	Votes	%	±%
General Election, November 8, 1892
Democratic	John C. Harmon	1,257	53.26%	
Republican	C. P. Barker	821	34.79%	
Populist	Mellen Larabee	184	7.80%	
Prohibition	F. Sprague	98	4.15%	
Plurality		436	18.47%	
Total votes		2,360	100.0%	
Democratic win (new seat)				

Wisconsin State Assembly
Preceded by James Andrew Taylor (whole county)	Member of the Wisconsin State Assembly from the Chippewa 1st district January 2, 1893 – January 7, 1895	Succeeded by Charles A. Stanley
