= Benjamin Franklin Millard =

19th century American politician

Benjamin F. Millard

21st Mayor of Chippewa Falls, Wisconsin
- In office April 1892 – April 1893
- Preceded by: Jacob Leinenkugel
- Succeeded by: W. H. Stafford

Member of the Wisconsin State Assembly from the Chippewa district
- In office January 7, 1889 – January 5, 1891
- Preceded by: Thomas J. Cunningham
- Succeeded by: James Andrew Taylor

Personal details
- Born: May 5, 1850 Baraboo, Wisconsin, U.S.
- Died: January 27, 1926 (aged 75) Seattle, Washington, U.S.
- Resting place: Cremated
- Party: Republican
- Spouses: Eva Buzzell (divorced); Ruth Butterfield; two earlier wives
- Parent: Franklin Millard (father)
- Occupation: Lumberman, florist, mine operator

Benjamin Franklin Millard (May 5, 1850 – January 27, 1926) was an American businessman, politician, and pioneer of Alaska and Washington. He was the 21st mayor of Chippewa Falls, Wisconsin, and represented Chippewa County in the Wisconsin State Assembly during the 1889 session.

== Biography ==
Benjamin F. Millard was born on May 5, 1850, in Baraboo, Wisconsin. As a child, he moved with his father to Minnesota, then to Menomonie, Wisconsin, in 1858, before finally settling at Chippewa Falls, Wisconsin, in 1861. He came from an impoverished background and went to work in the logging camps around Chippewa Falls.

He was able to become a majority owner of the Chippewa Falls Woolen and Linen Mills, and owned a number of greenhouses. He was active with the Republican Party of Wisconsin, and was elected to the Chippewa Falls city council and the Chippewa County board of supervisors. In 1888, he was elected to the Wisconsin State Assembly and served in the 1889 session of the Legislature. He was defeated running for re-election 1890. In 1892, however, he was elected mayor of Chippewa Falls, and served a one-year term.

In 1898, he moved to the District of Alaska. There, he organized the Galena Bay Mining Company and purchased a stake in the Bonanza Copper Mine of Alaska. He also owned or part-owned several other mining companies, including the Cliff and Granite Gold Mines.

Later in life, he relocated to Seattle, Washington, where he died in 1926.

== Personal life and family ==
Millard married four times. He was survived by two children and his fourth wife.

== Electoral history ==
=== Wisconsin Assembly (1888, 1890) ===
Wisconsin Assembly, Chippewa District Election, 1888
Party	Candidate	Votes	%	±%
General Election, November 6, 1888
Republican	Benjamin F. Millard	2,662	48.81%	+10.23%
Democratic	Robert Patten	2,538	46.53%	−7.78%
Prohibition	John Bates	254	4.66%	−2.45%
Plurality		124	2.27%	-13.46%
Total votes		5,454	100.0%	+18.21%
Republican gain from Democratic				

Wisconsin Assembly, Chippewa District Election, 1890
Party	Candidate	Votes	%	±%
General Election, November 4, 1890
Democratic	James Andrew Taylor	1,562	47.96%	+1.42%
Republican	Benjamin F. Millard (incumbent)	1,518	46.61%	−2.20%
Prohibition	Joseph Burrington	177	5.43%	+0.78%
Plurality		44	1.35%	-0.92%
Total votes		3,257	100.0%	-40.28%
Democratic gain from Republican				

Wisconsin State Assembly
Preceded by Thomas J. Cunningham	Member of the Wisconsin State Assembly from the Chippewa district January 7, 1889 – January 5, 1891	Succeeded by James Andrew Taylor
Political offices
Preceded by Jacob Leinenkugel	Mayor of Chippewa Falls, Wisconsin; April 1892 – April 1893	Succeeded by W. H. Stafford
