= John Harmon =

John Harmon may refer to:

- John Harmon (actor) (1905–1985), American actor
- John Harmon (attorney) (born 1944), United States Assistant Attorney General under President Jimmy Carter
- John Harmon (coach), Boston University basketball and football coach
- John Harmon (character), a character in Our Mutual Friend
- John Harmon (Wisconsin politician) (1845–1921), American lumberman and politician.
- John H. Harmon (1819–1888), mayor of Detroit and publisher of the Detroit Free Press
- John T. W. Harmon, Liberian-American bishop of the Episcopal Diocese of Arkansas
