= Hotel Chippewa =

- U.S. National Register of Historic Places
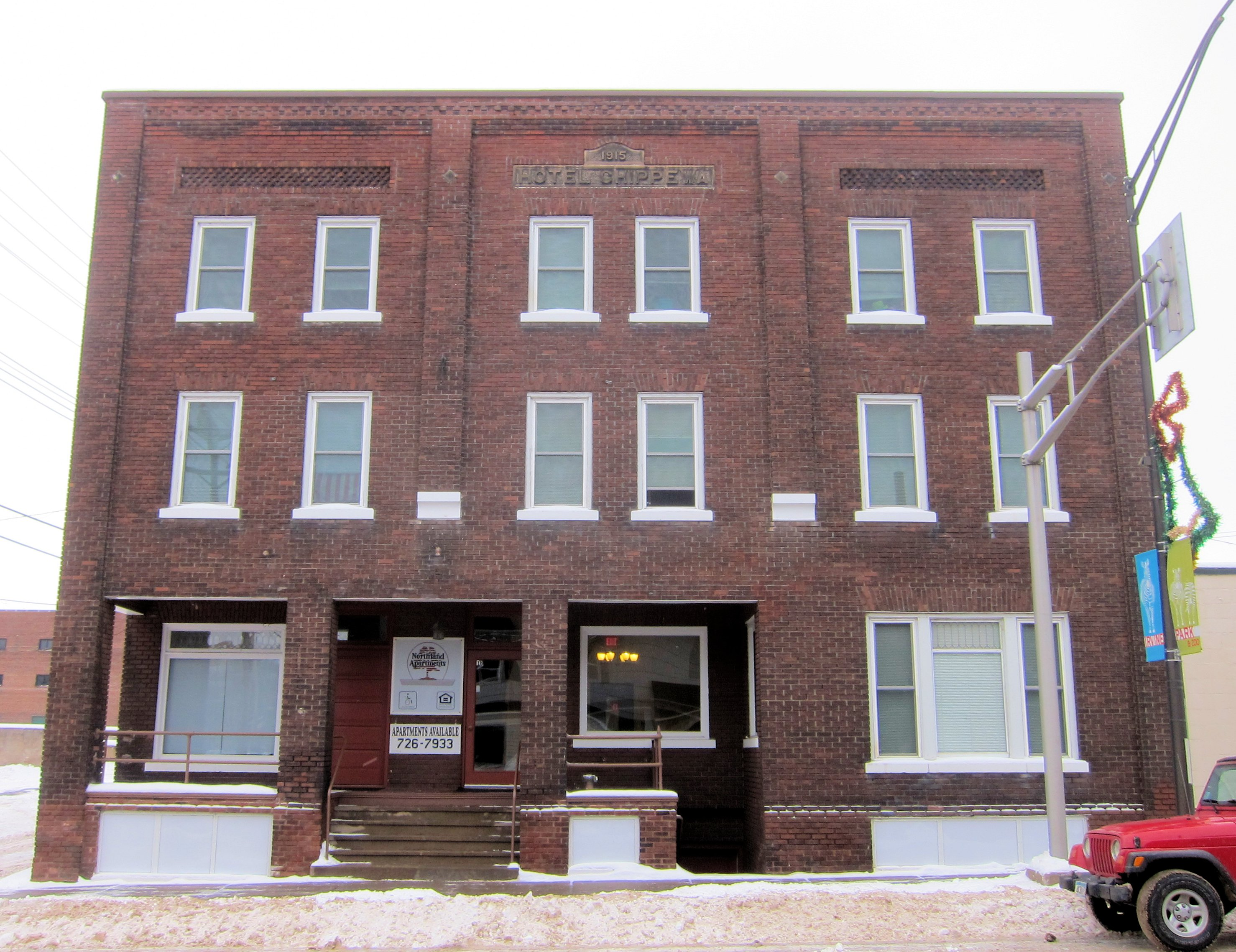
- Hotel Chippewa
- Location: 16-18 N. Bay St., Chippewa Falls, Wisconsin
- Coordinates: 44°56′04″N 91°23′33″W
- Area: less than one acre
- Built: 1915
- Architect: Carl Rockstead
- Architectural style: Late 19th And Early 20th Century American Movements
- NRHP reference No.: 94000598
- Added to NRHP: June 30, 1994

Hotel Chippewa is located in Chippewa Falls, Wisconsin.

== History ==
Located near a railroad, the hotel featured telephones in every room and fire escapes, both of which were groundbreaking at the time. The building has since been converted into apartments.
