= Henry Casson =

20th Sergeant-at-Arms of the U.S. House of Representatives

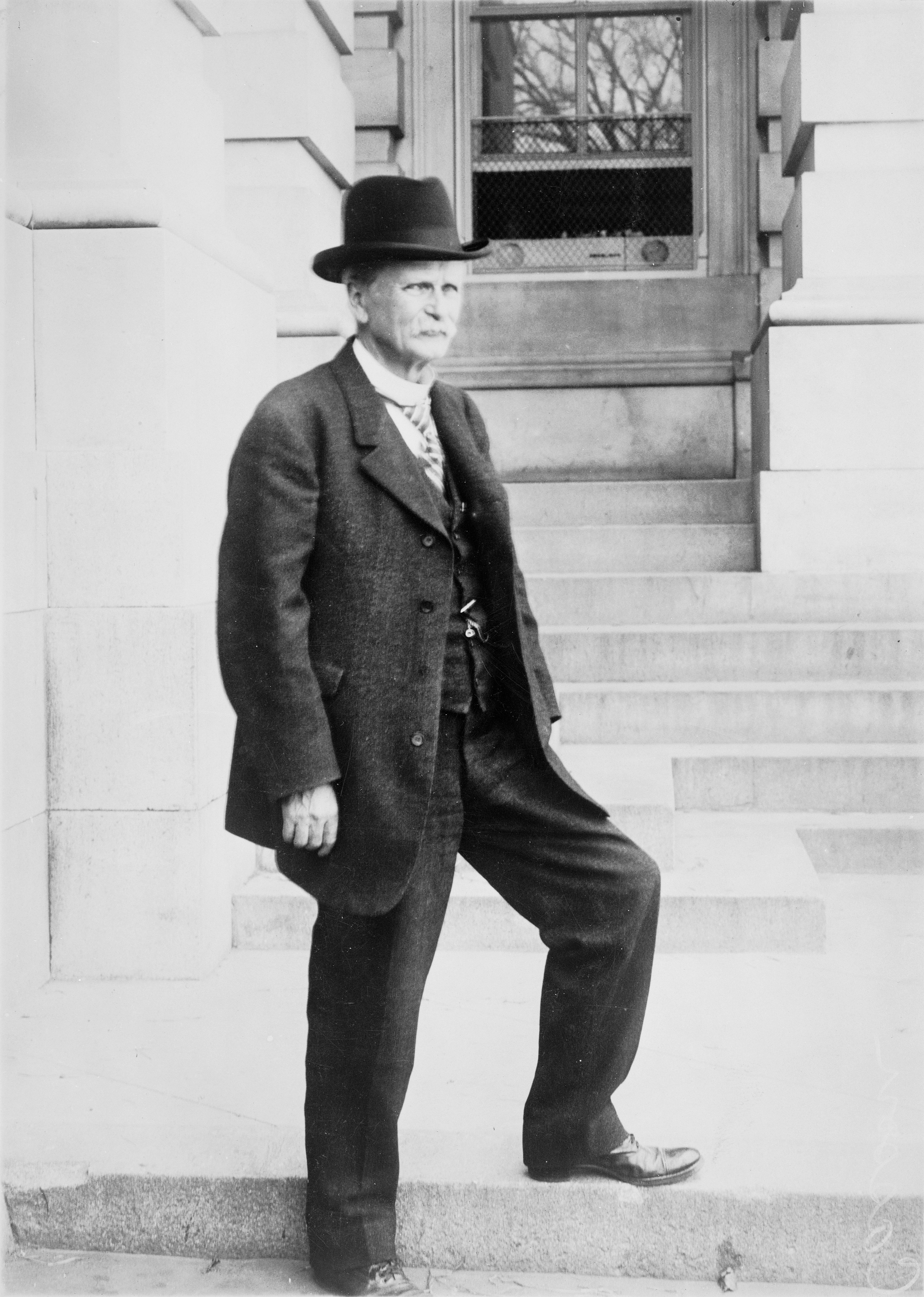

20th Sergeant at Arms of the United States House of Representatives
- In office December 4, 1899 – April 4, 1911
- Leader: David B. Henderson; Joseph Gurney Cannon
- Preceded by: Benjamin F. Russell
- Succeeded by: Uriah S. Jackson

15th Secretary of State of Wisconsin
- In office January 7, 1895 – January 2, 1899
- Governor: William H. Upham; Edward Scofield
- Preceded by: Thomas Cunningham
- Succeeded by: William Froehlich

Personal details
- Born: December 13, 1843 Brownsville, Pennsylvania, U.S.
- Died: September 25, 1912 (aged 68) Madison, Wisconsin, U.S.
- Cause of death: Appendicitis
- Resting place: Forest Hill Cemetery, Madison, Wisconsin
- Party: Republican
- Children: Henry Casson, Jr.; (born 1877; died 1929)

Military service
- Allegiance: United States
- Branch/service: Wisconsin National Guard
- Rank: Colonel

Henry Casson (December 13, 1843 – September 25, 1912) was an American newspaper publisher and public administrator. He was the 20th Sergeant at Arms of the United States House of Representatives, serving from 1899 through 1911, and was the 15th Secretary of State of Wisconsin (1895–1899).

== Biography ==
Born in Brownsville, Pennsylvania, as a child, he moved with his family to Illinois, where he received a common school education. He moved to Wisconsin in 1873, settling at Viroqua, in Vernon County. He became the owner of the Vernon County Censor in 1875, and was printer, publisher, and editor of the paper until 1885.

That year, he was employed by Governor Jeremiah McLain Rusk as the Governor's private secretary. Rusk also appointed him a colonel in the Wisconsin National Guard as aide-de-camp and military secretary, and he was often referred to as "Colonel Casson" for the remainder of his life. When Governor Rusk left office, Casson continued to work as private secretary to the new governor, William D. Hoard, ultimately serving from 1885 to 1891.

In 1891, he was summoned to Washington, D.C., to serve Governor Rusk again in his new role as United States Secretary of Agriculture. Casson worked for Rusk until his death, and was appointed Chief Clerk of the United States Department of Agriculture. After Rusk's death, Casson went to work as private secretary to freshman congressman Joseph W. Babcock, until August 1894.

That fall, Casson was the Republican nominee for Secretary of State of Wisconsin, and defeated incumbent Democratic Secretary of State Thomas J. Cunningham. He was subsequently reelected in 1896, serving from 1895 through 1899. He did not seek a third term in 1898.

With a Republican returning to the White House in 1899, Casson sought a new federal appointment from President William McKinley. First, pursuing appointment as Chief of the Bureau of Engraving and Printing, and then Director for the 1900 United States census. Receiving neither office, he was temporarily installed as federal post office inspector for rural delivery.

During the first fall recess of the 56th Congress, Casson's legion of friends and political allies, including the entire Wisconsin congressional delegation, lobbied for his selection as Sergeant at Arms of the United States House of Representatives. In December of that year, their efforts were rewarded when the majority Republican caucus elected Casson to that office. He would continue to serve as Sergeant-at-Arms under the Republican majority for the next eleven years until Democrats regained the majority in 1911. He officially stood down from the role on April 4, 1911.

== Personal life ==
Casson's father was also named Henry Casson, and in his younger years he was referred to as Henry Casson, Jr. Later, however, he was referred to as Henry Casson, Sr., after his own son was born and also named Henry Casson. His son became a prominent lawyer in Madison, and held several local offices, but died of pneumonia at age 52. Casson was said to have been a very close friend of Governor Jeremiah McLain Rusk, who he served for several years.

Casson died on September 25, 1912, at St. Mary's Hospital in Madison, Wisconsin, after surgery for Appendicitis and stomach ulcer. At the time of his death, his wife and son were still alive. He was interred at Madison's historic Forest Hill Cemetery.

Party political offices
Preceded by Robert Wallace Jackson	Republican nominee for Secretary of State of Wisconsin; 1894, 1896	Succeeded by William Froehlich
Political offices
Preceded by Thomas Cunningham	Secretary of State of Wisconsin; 1895 – 1899	Succeeded by William Froehlich
U.S. House of Representatives
Preceded by Benjamin F. Russell	Sergeant at Arms of the United States House of Representatives; 1899–1911	Succeeded by Uriah Stokes Jackson
