= Heyde Center for the Arts =

Coordinates: 44.93641°N 91.38788°W

The Heyde Center for the Arts is an art center located in Chippewa Falls, Wisconsin. Constructed in 1907 in the Neoclassical architecture style, it is the original site of McDonell Central Catholic High School. The center is owned and operated by the Chippewa Valley Cultural Association (CVCA). It is listed on the National Register of Historic Places.

== History ==
The McDonell Memorial High School building was constructed in 1907 by Alexander McDonell, a lumberman, in memory of his wife and four children who had died before him. It was closed in 1964 when a new high school was built on the other side of town. For ten years after it was closed, the building was allowed to deteriorate. The founding members of the CVCA saw the beauty and potential in the building and organized in 1976 to prevent the demolition of the building.

The project was halted by a lack of money, then was taken up again in the 1980s when a feasibility study was conducted on restoring the building. Although the study was pessimistic, the members were undeterred. It was not until the 1990s when the CVCA reached a critical mass of people and resources that pushed them through the restoration and improvement of the building.

During the fundraising, renovation, and restoration of the building, the Association organized performances in many borrowed spaces around the city. This raised community awareness of the goals of the Association and a sample of the performances and entertainment it would provide in the future. Skilled and unskilled laborers provided volunteer labor. The most current appraisal puts the value of the building at $1.3 million, and the CVCA is essentially debt-free.

More than 100,000 people a year take part in seasonal art shows and workshops, poetry readings, dance recitals, concerts and theater performances. A 17-member CVCA volunteer board manages the facility and the association has more than 350 members. The CVCA maintains a database of actors, musicians and visual artists from west-central Wisconsin. It collaborates with local and state agencies and organizations to provide arts opportunities for youth and adults needing special services.
