= Matthew Holden =

American political scientist (1931–2025)

Member of the Federal Energy Regulatory Commission
- In office October 28, 1977 – August 31, 1981
- President: Jimmy Carter; Ronald Reagan
- Succeeded by: Oliver G. Richard III

Member of the Public Service Commission of Wisconsin
- In office May 5, 1975 – October 28, 1977
- Governor: Patrick Lucey; Martin J. Schreiber
- Preceded by: Arthur L. Padrutt
- Succeeded by: Edward Parsons Jr.

Personal details
- Born: September 12, 1931 Mound Bayou, Mississippi, U.S.
- Died: January 26, 2025 (aged 93)
- Education: Roosevelt College (BA); Northwestern University (MA, PhD)
- Occupation: Political scientist; educator; author; government official

Military service
- Branch/service: United States Army
- Years of service: 1955–1957

Matthew Holden Jr. (September 12, 1931 – January 26, 2025) was an American political scientist.

== Life and career ==
Holden was born in Mound Bayou, Mississippi on September 12, 1931. He attended public school in Mississippi and Chicago, Illinois. Holden graduated from the University of Chicago in 1950 and received a B.A. degree in political science from Roosevelt University in 1954. He received an M.A. from Northwestern University in 1956 and his Ph.D. in 1961. Holden served in the Korean War from 1955 to 1957.

Holden taught political science at the University of Illinois, Wayne State University, and the University of Pittsburgh. He was a professor of Political Science/Public Policy Administration at the University of Wisconsin–Madison from 1969 to 1981. He joined the University of Virginia faculty in 1981 and became the Henry L. and Grace M. Doherty Professor Emeritus of Politics.

He served on the Public Service Commission of Wisconsin from 1975 to 1977 and on the Federal Energy Regulatory Commission from 1977 to 1981. Later in 1977, Holden was elected as a fellow of the National Academy of Public Administration. According to his University of Virginia Department of Politics biography, he published articles in political science and other journals including the Journal of Politics and the American Political Science Review. Holden became President of the American Political Science Association in 1989. He retired in 2002.

Holden died on January 26, 2025, at the age of 93.
