= Leo Macdonell =

American sportswriter (1888–1957)

- Born: August 17, 1888; Chippewa Falls, Wisconsin
- Died: October 6, 1957 (aged 69); Northridge, Los Angeles, California
- Occupation: Sportswriter
- Employer: Detroit Times (1924-1957)
- Known for: President, Baseball Writers' Association of America, 1946
- Spouse: Mary (Schibret) Macdonell

Leo Abbott Macdonell (August 17, 1888 – October 6, 1957) was an American sportswriter at the Detroit Times for 33 years from 1924 to 1957. He served as the president of the Baseball Writers' Association of America in 1946.

== Early years ==
Macdonell was born in Chippewa Falls, Wisconsin in August 1888. He was the son of Donald Macdonell (1861–1948) and Mary Harrett (Ermatinger) Macdonell (1868–1925). By 1900, the family had moved to Superior, Wisconsin, where Macdonell's father was employed as a storekeeper, and later in the life insurance business, and as a bookkeeper in a coal office.

== Reporter in Wisconsin ==
By 1910, Macdonell was employed as a reporter for a newspaper in Superior, Wisconsin. At the time of World War I, Macdonnella was a newspaper reporter for the Superior Telegram. At the time of the 1920 United States census, Macdonell was living in Superior, working as a journalist. He became the managing editor of the Superior Times and also worked as a boxing promoter.

== Detroit Times ==
Macdonell came to Detroit, Michigan as a sportswriter for the Detroit Times, a position he held for 33 years. While with the Times, Macdonell covered the Detroit Tigers, Detroit Red Wings, and Michigan Wolverines. At the time of the 1930 United States census, Macdonell was living at 3781 West Philadelphia Street in Detroit. He was employed as a newspaper reporter.

Macdonell was the Detroit Times hockey and golf reporter in the early 1930s, but he was recruited to cover the Detroit Tigers for the 1934 World Series. In March 1937, Macdonell gave up the hockey beat at the Detroit Times to cover the Tigers on a full-time basis. By the late 1930s, he was also the sports editor at the Detroit Times.

In 1939, Macdonell was added to the committee of 24 baseball writers responsible for selecting the American League's Most Valuable Player.

The Detroit Times was part of the Hearst newspaper syndicate, and Macdonell's baseball writing was often published in other Hearst newspapers through the International News Service, Hearst's wire service. In July 1945, Macdonell's story about Hank Greenberg hitting a home run in his first game after returning from wartime military service was published in Hearst newspapers across the country and for military personnel in Stars and Stripes.

In October 1945, Macdonell was elected as the vice president of the Baseball Writers' Association of America. He became the president of the Baseball Writers' Association of America in 1946. He was also selected to serve on the Association's board of directors in October 1947.

Macdonell also served as official scorer at the 1946 World Series between the St. Louis Cardinals and Boston Red Sox.

Macdonell insisted to his fellow reporters that "the toughest decision for a sports writer to make was the one that would take him off his beat." Explaining his love for sports writing, Macdonell once asked and answered this question while interviewing Hank Greenberg: "When millionaires retire what do they do? They go to big golf tournaments, visit Florida baseball camps, attend big prize fights and watch Davis Cup matches at Forest Hills. It is their idea of paradise, the ideal existence. A sports writer is even closer to the fun than an ordinary spectator. Why should he give up all that if his health is OK?"

== Later years and death ==
Macdonell was married to Mary (Schibret) Macdonell. They had two sons Robert (1921–1994) and Donald (1924–1956) and a daughter, Mrs. Daniel Sheahan.

Macdonell suffered from Parkinson's disease during the last several years of his life. He retired in the summer of 1957 and moved to Northridge, Los Angeles, California. He died there in October 1957 at age 69.

After Macdonell died, the Baseball Writers' Association of America established the Leon Macdonell Trophy for the "most co-operative American League player to the press." Tigers' shortstop Harvey Kuenn was the first recipient of the trophy.

== Selected articles by Macdonell ==
- "Grimm Fears Slugging Trio" (1935 World Series), Detroit Times, September 29, 1935
- "Must Beat a Very Good Ball Club" (1935 World Series), Detroit Times, October 1, 1935
- "Cochrane Needs Another Pitcher To Put Tigers in Pennant Race" (Mickey Cochrane), International News Service story, March 25, 1937
- "A German Tiger" (Les Mueller), International News Service story, February 2, 1938
- "Baker Sharpens Tigers' Claws (Del Baker), International News Service story, April 2, 1942
- "Sunday Homer Greatest Thrill for Greenberg" (Hank Greenberg), Stars and Stripes, July 4, 1945
- "Greenberg Homers in New Uniform" (Hank Greenberg), Stars and Stripes, July 5, 1945
- Series a Dream To Hack Miller (1945 World Series), The Sporting News, October 18, 1945, page 5
- He Plays First and Sousaphone (George Vico), Baseball Digest, July 1948
