= Thomas Eugene Grady =

American judge

- Born: November 19, 1880; Chippewa Falls, Wisconsin, U.S.
- Died: April 5, 1974 (aged 93)
- Occupation: Judge
- Known for: Justice of the Washington Supreme Court
- Political party: Republican

Thomas Eugene Grady (November 19, 1880 – April 5, 1974) was a justice of the Washington Supreme Court.

== Biography ==
Grady was born on November 19, 1880, in Chippewa Falls, Wisconsin. He attended Chippewa Falls High School and the University of Minnesota Law School. In 1905, Grady moved to Yakima, Washington. On June 3, 1908, he married Alice M. Beane. They had three children.

== Career ==
Grady was appointed a superior court judge in 1911 and served until 1917. In 1917, he became City Attorney of Yakima, where he was also a member of the City Council. He went on to be a member of the Supreme Court twice. First, from 1942 to 1945 and second, from 1949 to 1955. He was a Republican.
