= Bridge Street Historic District (Las Vegas, New Mexico) =

Historic district in New Mexico, United States

- U.S. National Register of Historic Places
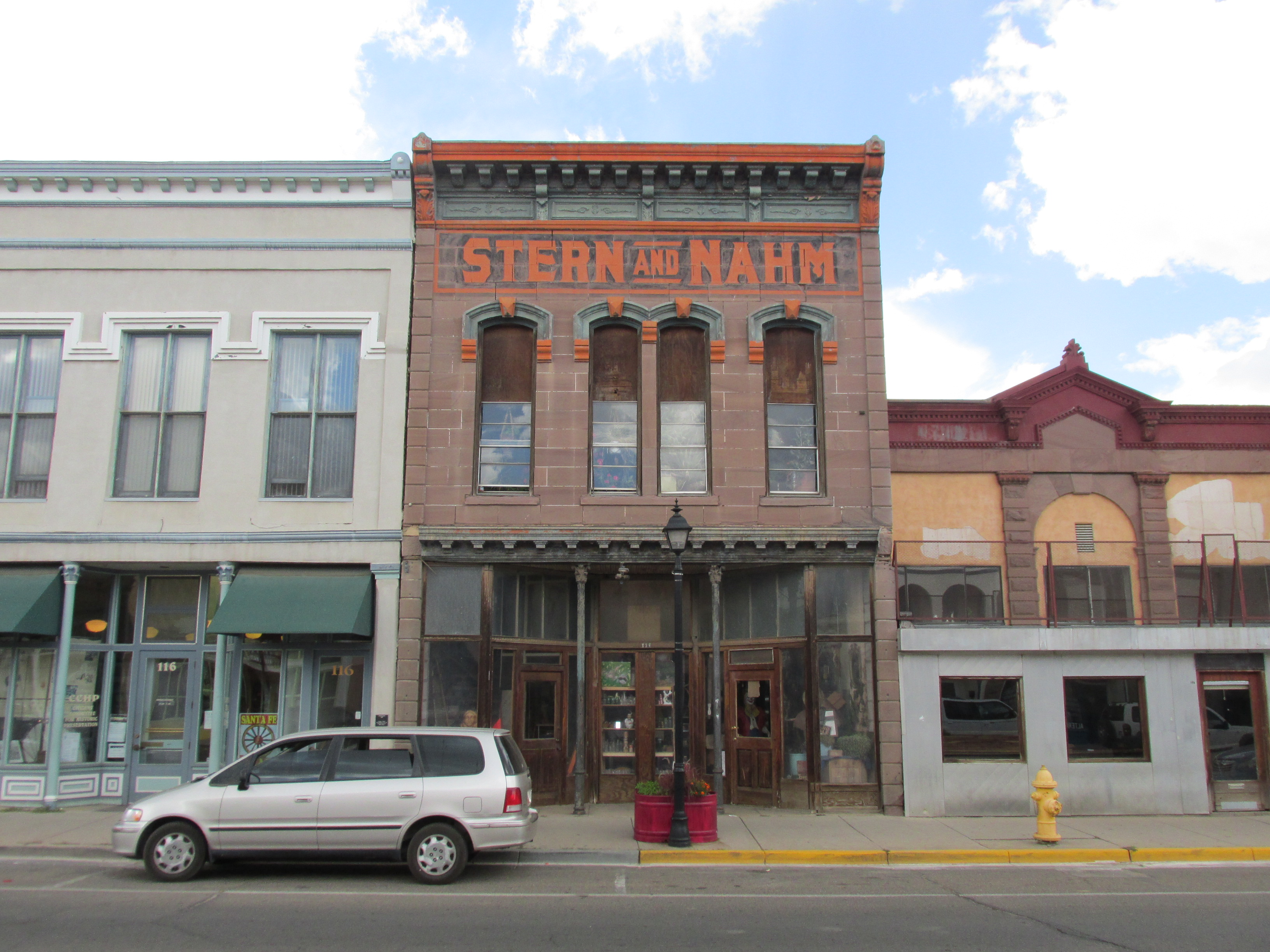

- Location within New Mexico
- Location: 100 block of Bridge St., Las Vegas, New Mexico
- Coordinates: 35°35′36″N 105°13′27″W
- Area: 7 acres (2.8 ha)
- Architectural style: Italianate
- MPS: Las Vegas New Mexico MRA (AD)
- NRHP reference No.: 78001824
- Added to NRHP: July 26, 1978

The Bridge Street Historic District in Las Vegas, New Mexico was listed on the National Register of Historic Places in 1978. The listing included 28 contributing buildings and a contributing structure.

It includes the Gallinas River Bridge and the 100 block of Bridge St., which was a wagon road before 1879.

It abuts the Las Vegas Plaza historic district, which also is listed on the National Register.
