= Bridge Street Commercial Historic District =

Historic district in Wisconsin, United States

- U.S. National Register of Historic Places
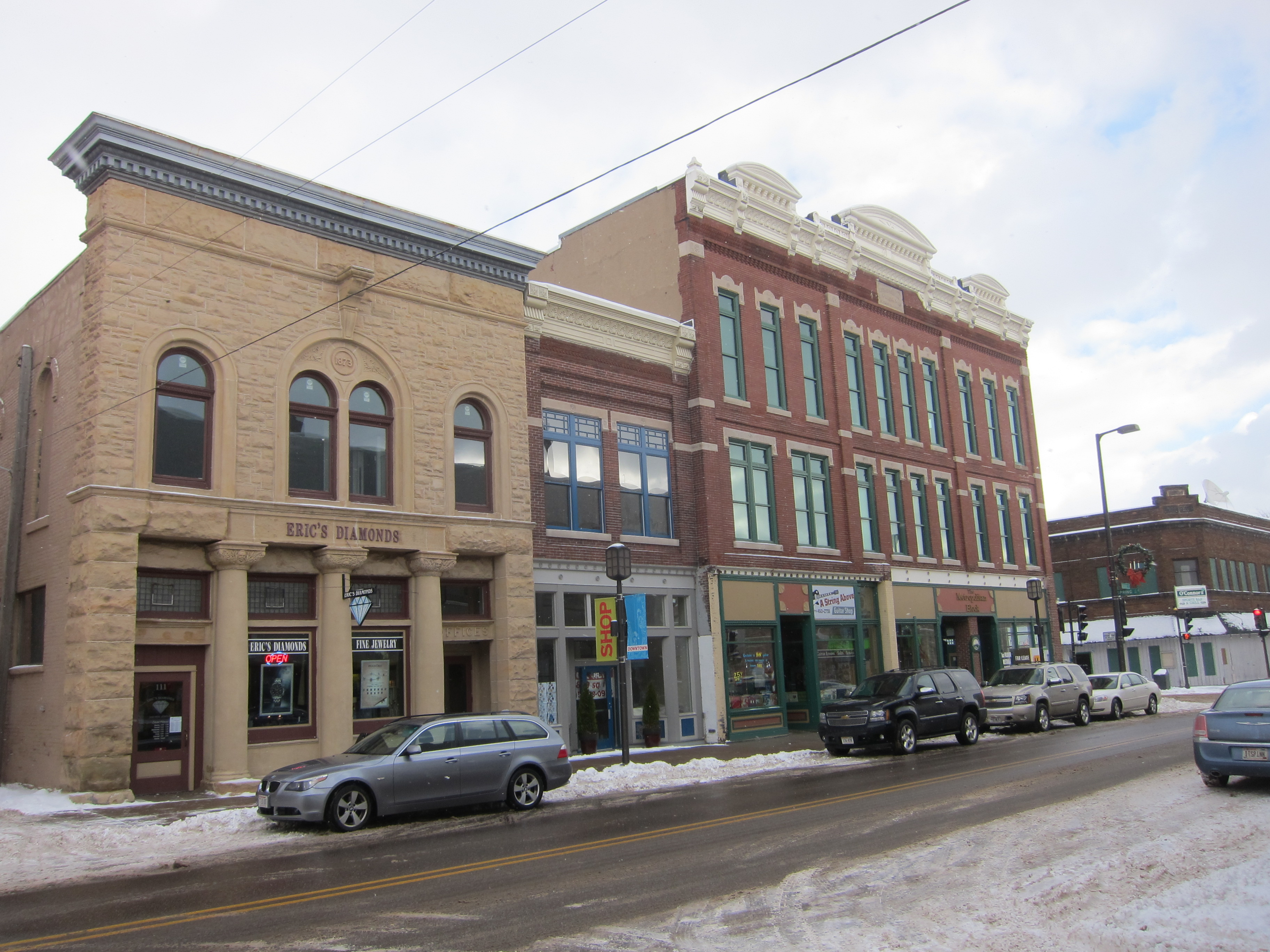
- A portion of the district.
- Location: Roughly Bridge St. from Columbia to Spring Sts. Chippewa Falls, Wisconsin
- NRHP reference No.: 94000648
- Added to NRHP: June 24, 1994

The Bridge Street Commercial Historic District is located in Chippewa Falls, Wisconsin.

== Description ==
The district includes 33 contributing properties built from 1873 to 1943, including the Romanesque Revival First National Bank built in 1873, several Italianate buildings from the 1880s, the 1890 Caesar Harness Shop, the 1908 Neoclassical-styled Federal Building, and the 1919 Neoclassical Hotel Northern.

The district was added to the State and the National Register of Historic Places in 1994.
