= Paul H. Raihle =

American politician

Paul H. Raihle (May 13, 1892 in Melrose, Minnesota – June 6, 1963) was a member of the Wisconsin State Assembly. He served in the military during World War I and attended the University of Paris. His wife, Sylvia Havre Raihle, would also be a member of the Assembly. They had five children.

== Political career ==
Raihle was elected to the Assembly in 1924. He was a Republican.
