= Sylvia H. Raihle =

American politician

Sylvia Havre Raihle (January 12, 1892 – March 2, 1972) was elected as a Republican to the Wisconsin State Assembly in 1948. She lived in Chippewa Falls, Wisconsin.

Raihle went to St. Cloud State University, University of Minnesota, and University of Minnesota Law School. She taught school and worked for the Veterans Administration at Fort Snelling and Washington, D.C. as a hospital contact worker. Before securing the nomination in 1948 despite Republican opposition, she had been an unsuccessful candidate in 1942. Her husband Paul H. Raihle also served in the Wisconsin State Assembly. She was a member of the American Legion Auxiliary. She died on March 2, 1972.
