= William B. Bartlett =

American politician (1830–1911)

William Buckley Bartlett (October 8, 1830 – March 24, 1911) was an American politician, businessman, and farmer.

Born in Dorset, Vermont, W. B. Bartlett moved from Vermont to Ohio. Through his birth mother, Salome Manley, he was a direct descendant of the Pilgrim Elder, William Brewster. He went to public school. In 1861, Bartlett settled in Eagle Point, Wisconsin. He was a farmer and was involved with the Eagle Point Fire Insurance Company. In 1882 and 1903, Bartlett served in the Wisconsin State Assembly as a Republican. He also served on the town board as chairman, the school board as treasurer, and the Chippewa County, Wisconsin Board of Supervisors as chairman. Bartlett School in Eagle Point Township was named in his honor. W. B. Bartlett died in St. Joseph's Hospital in Chippewa Falls, Wisconsin as a result of complications from surgery. He is buried in Forest Hill Cemetery in Chippewa Falls, Wisconsin.
