= Hector McRae =

American politician

Hector McRae (March 21, 1837 – August 12, 1920) was a member of the Wisconsin State Assembly.

== Biography ==
McRae was born on March 21, 1837, in Stormont County, Upper Canada. He moved to Chippewa Falls, Wisconsin, in 1868. He died of stomach cancer in Chippewa Falls on August 12, 1920.

== Career ==
McRae was elected to the Assembly in 1879. Previously, he served four terms as Treasurer of Chippewa County, Wisconsin. He was a Republican.
