= Chippewa Falls, Wisconsin =

- City
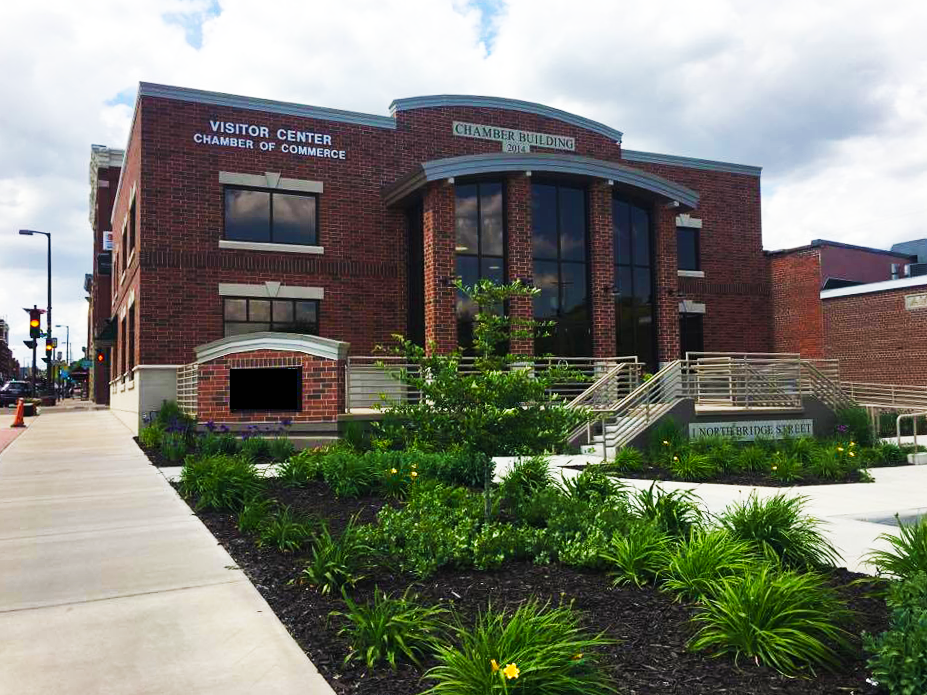
- Chippewa Falls Chamber Building Downtown

- Chippewa Falls logo

- Location of Chippewa Falls in Chippewa County, Wisconsin.

- Location within Wisconsin Location within the United States
- Coordinates: 44°56′N 91°24′W
- Country: United States
- State: Wisconsin
- County: Chippewa

Government
  - Mayor: Jason R. Hiess

Area
  - Total: 11.86 sq mi (30.72 km^{2})
  - Land: 11.32 sq mi (29.31 km^{2})
  - Water: 0.54 sq mi (1.41 km^{2})
- Elevation: 820 ft (250 m)

Population (2020 census)
  - Total: 14,731
  - Density: 1,301.7/sq mi (502.6/km^{2})
- Time zone: UTC-6 (Central (CST))
  - Summer (DST): UTC-5 (CDT)
- Zip code: 54729, 54774 (companies/organisations)
- Area codes: 715 & 534
- FIPS code: 55-14575
- GNIS feature ID: 1563041
- Website: chippewafalls-wi.gov

Chippewa Falls (/ˌtʃɪpəwə ˈfɔːlz/) is a city located on the Chippewa River in Chippewa County, Wisconsin, United States. The population was 14,731 in the 2020 census. Incorporated as a city in 1869, it is the county seat of Chippewa County. The city's name originated from its location on the Chippewa River, which is named after the Ojibwe. It is a principal city of the Eau Claire–Chippewa Falls metropolitan area.

Chippewa Falls is the birthplace of Seymour Cray, known as the "father of supercomputing", and the headquarters for the original Cray Research. It is also the home of the Jacob Leinenkugel Brewing Company, the Heyde Center for the Arts, a showcase venue for artists and performers; Irvine Park, and the annual Northern Wisconsin State Fair. Chippewa Falls is 15 miles (24 km) from the annual four-day music festivals Hoofbeat and Rock Fest.

== History ==
For thousands of years the Chippewa River was a water highway through a wilderness of forests and swamps, travelled by Ojibwe people, Dakota and others. More recently, Native Americans guided European explorers up the river and around the Falls. Pierre LeSueur "discovered" the Chippewa Spring in 1700 when this area was part of New France. Jonathan Carver traveled up the river with his party in 1768 when the area was claimed by Britain.

White settlement of the Chippewa Falls area began in 1838, when Lyman Warren and his mostly-Chippewa wife started a farm and blacksmith shop five miles above the Falls. As agreed at the 1825 treaty of Prairie du Chien, Warren was to act as a sub-agent for the U.S. government to the Chippewas. Intertwined with that, Warren's farm served as a trading post for the American Fur Company.

The Chippewa River's watershed held a huge amount of valuable timber — more than the Wisconsin River - and before railroad and roads, the only way to transport much of it out was down the river, through what would become Chippewa Falls. When the 1837 Treaty of St. Peters opened this part of northern Wisconsin to logging, Jean Brunett led a team up the Chippewa River to build a sawmill at the Falls. With great effort and expense, they managed to build the first mill there. It survived until June 1846, when a storm flooded the river and destroyed most of the millworks. The mill was rebuilt quickly and sawing resumed. The company's logging crews cut trees on their lands upstream in winter and drove logs down to the sawmill at The Falls each spring and summer, then other crews floated rafts of sawed lumber downstream to markets as far as St. Louis.

A settlement grew around the sawmill at the Falls, and in 1854 Chippewa Falls was chosen to be the seat of Chippewa County. A school, a post office, a mercantile store, the first churches, and the first newspaper had all opened by 1857. The city incorporated in 1869 with about 2,500 people. In the 1870s boardwalks were added along Bridge Street, gas streetlights were installed, and a telephone line was run up from Eau Claire.

Railroads also arrived in the 1870s. In 1870, the West Wisconsin Railway had built a line from St. Paul, Minnesota, to Milwaukee, running ten miles to the south through Eau Claire. In 1875 the Eau Claire and Chippewa Falls Railway connected that line from Eau Claire to Chippewa Falls. In 1880, the CF&W was joined by the Wisconsin and Minnesota Railway pushing its way west from Abbotsford. This was followed in 1881 by the Chippewa Falls & Northern Railroad, which built a line north from Chippewa Falls to Bloomer, eventually extending it to Superior.

Lumber-making had its ups and downs. Chippewa Falls was dominated by one big sawmill owned by one big lumber company, unlike Eau Claire, which had many. As mentioned above, Chippewa's first functioning mill was swept away by a flood of the river in 1846 or 1847. With that, the company was reorganized as the Chippewa Falls Lumber Company and rebuilt its mill in 1848, modernizing it to include two circular saws. In 1855 another flood took out part of the sawmill and millions of board feet of sawed lumber. The mill struggled financially through the Panic of 1857 and changed owners repeatedly. In 1869 it was reorganized as the Union Lumbering Company, which brought in new investors and expanded the mill. That company went bankrupt in 1875, failed again in 1877, and shut down the following year. In 1879 it was reorganized again as Chippewa Lumber & Boom Company. In 1881 the mill and its timber lands were bought by Frederick Weyerhaeuser's Mississippi River Logging Company. In 1886 the mill was struck by lightning and burned, then was rebuilt again. By the 1880s the Chippewa valley held the best remaining stand of white pine left in the Midwest. The company employed 400 people and the mill at Chippewa was said to be "the largest sawmill under one roof in the world." The sawmill continued operation until 1911, when the company had exhausted most of its timber holdings.

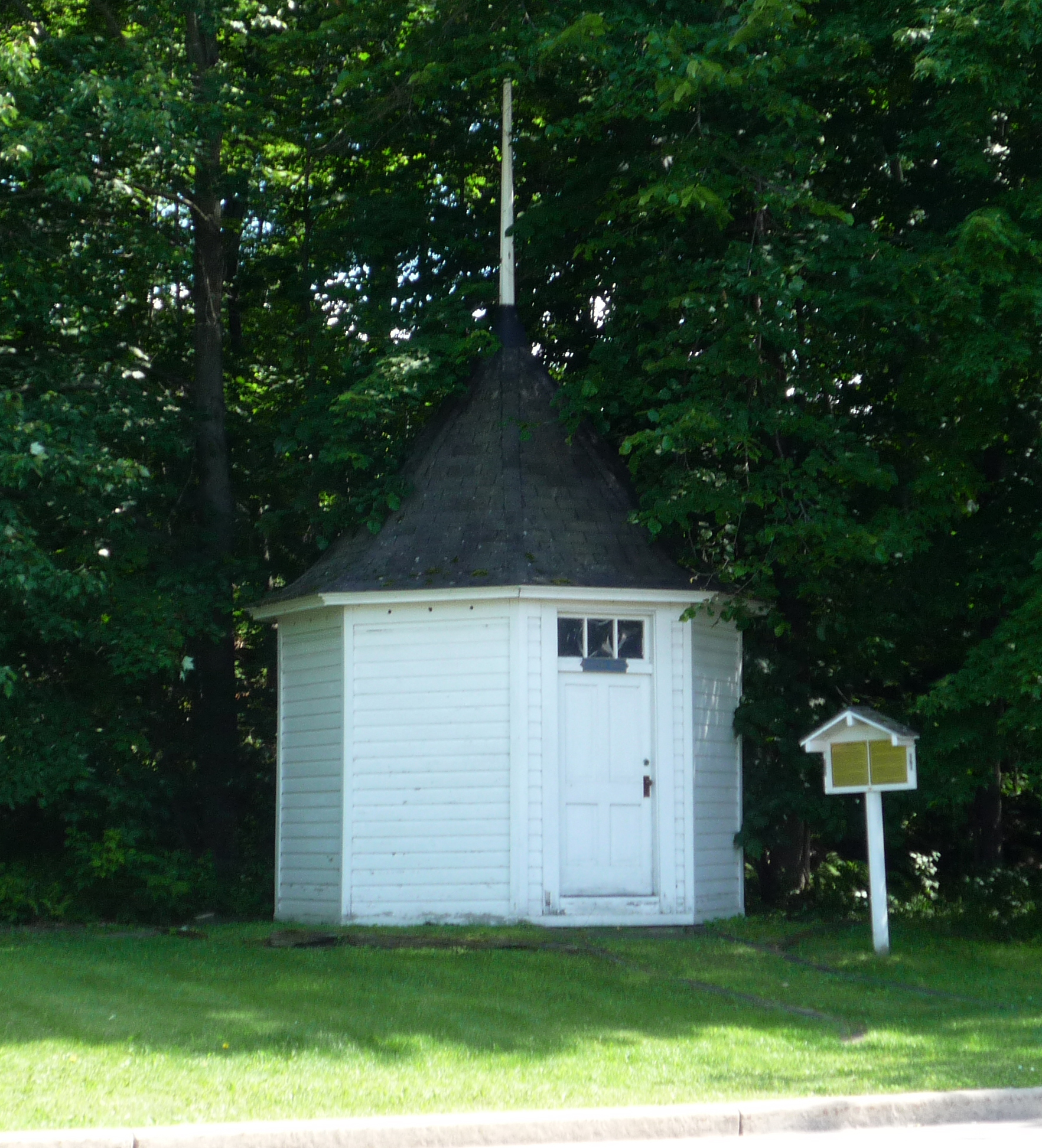
The original Chippewa Springs Company Spring House was built in 1893.

The Chippewa Spring gained renewed attention in 1887 when politician Thaddeus C. Pound founded the Chippewa Springs Health Club, and at one point oversaw the company that bottled the spring water for sale. A Spring House was built over the original spring in 1893. It remains today, across from the modern water bottling plant on Park Ave.

Other industries started in the 1880s and 1890s: flour mills, a brewery, a woolen mill, cigar factories, a shoe factory, and a broom factory. By 1902 it had become clear that the pineries were not as inexhaustible as many had thought, and a group of business leaders began to promote more diverse industries. They succeeded in starting more shoe factories, a sugar beet factory, and a glove factory. The big sawmill closed in 1911, but the other industries kept the community going. By 1920 the city had fifty manufacturers who employed 3,000 workers.

In 1962, computer scientist Seymour Cray moved his engineering team to Chippewa Falls from Control Data Corporation's downtown Minneapolis headquarters, to escape the timesink of managment interference. There he completed the CDC 6600, later termed the first supercomputer, which was the world's fastest computer until overtaken by the CDC 7600, another Cray design. In 1972, Cray founded Cray Research in Chippewa Falls, notable for the Cray-1 supercomputer.

== Geography ==
Chippewa Falls is located along the north bank of the Chippewa River approximately three miles west of Lake Wissota.

According to the United States Census Bureau, the city has a total area of 11.86 square miles (30.7 km^{2}), of which 11.32 square miles (29.3 km^{2}) is land and 0.54 square miles (1.4 km^{2}) is water.

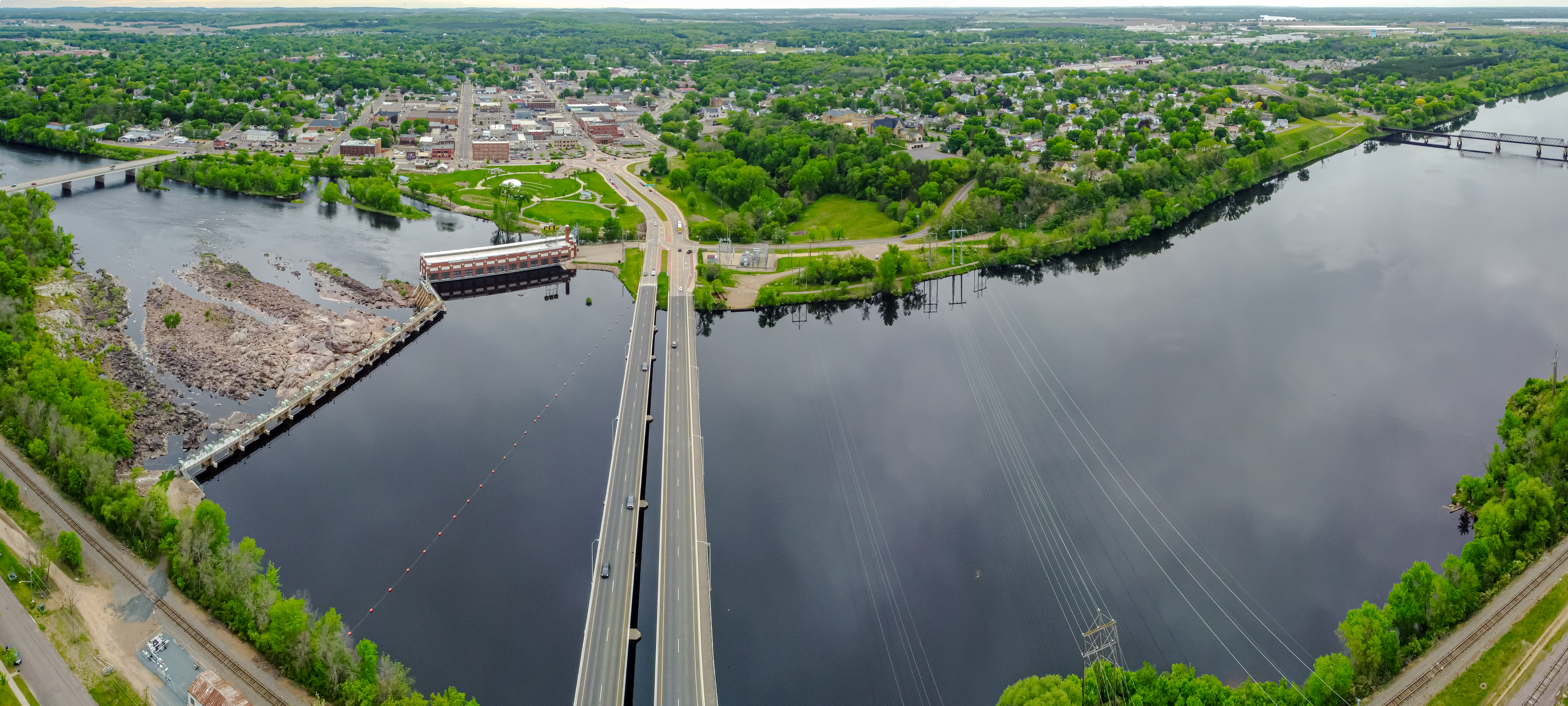
Business loop of US-53 crossing over the Chippewa River

== Climate ==
Chippewa Falls

Climate chart (precipitation, max. and min. temperature)
J	F	M	A	M	J	J	A	S	O	N	D
39 −11 −16	58 −6 −15	62 1 −8	133 17 2	180 22 8	189 26 14	63 27 17	101 25 17	78 21 13	111 14 4	47 7 −2	46 −9 −13
- █ Average max. and min. temperatures in °C
- █ Precipitation totals in mm
Imperial conversion
J	F	M	A	M	J	J	A	S	O	N	D
1.5 12 3	2.3 21 5	2.4 34 18	5.2 63 36	7.1 72 46	7.4 79 57	2.5 81 63	4 77 63	3.1 70 55	4.4 57 39	1.9 45 28	1.8 16 9
- █ Average max. and min. temperatures in °F
- █ Precipitation totals in inches

== Demographics ==
Historical population
Census	Pop.	Note	%±
1870	2,507		—
1880	3,982		58.8%
1890	8,670		117.7%
1900	8,094		−6.6%
1910	8,893		9.9%
1920	9,130		2.7%
1930	9,539		4.5%
1940	10,368		8.7%
1950	11,088		6.9%
1960	11,708		5.6%
1970	12,351		5.5%
1980	12,270		−0.7%
1990	12,727		3.7%
2000	12,925		1.6%
2010	13,661		5.7%
2020	14,731		7.8%
WI Counties 1900-1990

=== 2020 census ===
As of the 2020 census, Chippewa Falls had a population of 14,731. The population density was 1,301.7 inhabitants per square mile (502.6/km^{2}). The median age was 39.4 years. 21.2% of residents were under the age of 18 and 19.6% were 65 years of age or older. For every 100 females, there were 99.1 males, and for every 100 females age 18 and over, there were 99.2 males.

97.6% of residents lived in urban areas, while 2.4% lived in rural areas.

There were 6,482 households in Chippewa Falls, of which 24.9% had children under the age of 18 living in them. Of all households, 35.4% were married-couple households, 22.5% were households with a male householder and no spouse or partner present, and 33.1% were households with a female householder and no spouse or partner present. About 40.8% of all households were made up of individuals and 17.6% had someone living alone who was 65 years of age or older.

There were 6,772 housing units, of which 4.3% were vacant. The average housing unit density was 598.4 per square mile (231.0/km^{2}). The homeowner vacancy rate was 0.9% and the rental vacancy rate was 3.6%.

Racial composition as of the 2020 census
Race	Number	Percent
White	13,271	90.1%
Black or African American	285	1.9%
American Indian and Alaska Native	101	0.7%
Asian	197	1.3%
Native Hawaiian and Other Pacific Islander	4	0.0%
Some other race	104	0.7%
Two or more races	769	5.2%
Hispanic or Latino (of any race)	368	2.5%

=== 2010 census ===
As of the census of 2010, there were 13,661 people, 5,896 households, and 3,275 families living in the city. The population density was 1,201.5 inhabitants per square mile (463.9/km^{2}). There were 6,304 housing units at an average density of 554.4 per square mile (214.1/km^{2}). The racial makeup of the city was 95.1% White, 1.7% African American, 0.7% Native American, 0.9% Asian, 0.2% from other races, and 1.4% from two or more races. Hispanic or Latino of any race were 1.6% of the population.

There were 5,896 households, of which 29.1% had children under the age of 18 living with them, 37.7% were married couples living together, 13.0% had a female householder with no husband present, 4.9% had a male householder with no wife present, and 44.5% were non-families. 37.6% of all households were made up of individuals, and 16.7% had someone living alone who was 65 years of age or older. The average household size was 2.18 and the average family size was 2.86.

The median age in the city was 38 years. 22.9% of residents were under the age of 18; 9.1% were between the ages of 18 and 24; 27.1% were from 25 to 44; 24.6% were from 45 to 64; and 16.4% were 65 years of age or older. The gender makeup of the city was 50.7% male and 49.3% female.

=== 2000 census ===
At the 2000 census, there were 12,925 people, 5,638 households and 3,247 families living in the city. The population density was 1,191.2 per square mile (459.9/km^{2}). There were 5,905 housing units at an average density of 544.2 per square mile (210.1/km^{2}). The racial makeup of the city was 97.62% White, 0.30% African American, 0.46% Native American, 0.67% Asian, 0.01% Pacific Islander, 0.16% from other races, and 0.77% from two or more races. Hispanic or Latino of any race were 0.63% of the population.

There were 5,638 households, of which 28.8% had children under the age of 18 living with them, 42.4% were married couples living together, 11.3% had a female householder with no husband present, and 42.4% were non-families. 36.5% of all households were made up of individuals, and 16.4% had someone living alone who was 65 years of age or older. The average household size was 2.20 and the average family size was 2.89.

Age distribution was 24.2% under the age of 18, 9.4% from 18 to 24, 28.2% from 25 to 44, 20.3% from 45 to 64, and 17.9% who were 65 years of age or older. The median age was 37 years. For every 100 females, there were 89.5 males. For every 100 females age 18 and over, there were 85.2 males.

The median household income was $32,744, and the median family income was $43,519. Males had a median income of $32,016 versus $22,655 for females. The per capita income for the city was $18,366. About 8.7% of families and 10.3% of the population were below the poverty line, including 15.5% of those under age 18 and 5.8% of those age 65 or over.

== Government ==
Presidential elections results

Presidential elections results
Year	Republican	Democratic	Third parties
2020	48.1% 3,495	48.9% 3,553	3.0% 218
2016	46.6% 2,979	45.9% 2,934	7.5% 479
2012	42.5% 2,665	56.3% 3,530	1.2% 116

== Economy ==
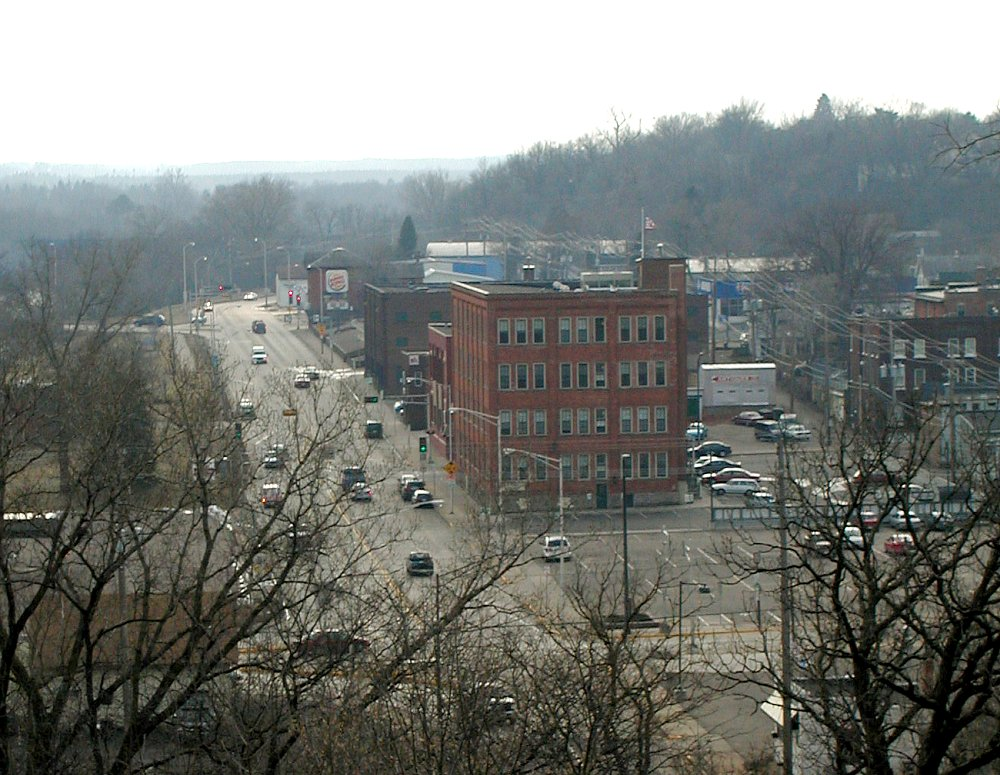
Renovated Chippewa Shoe Factory facing the Chippewa River in Chippewa Falls

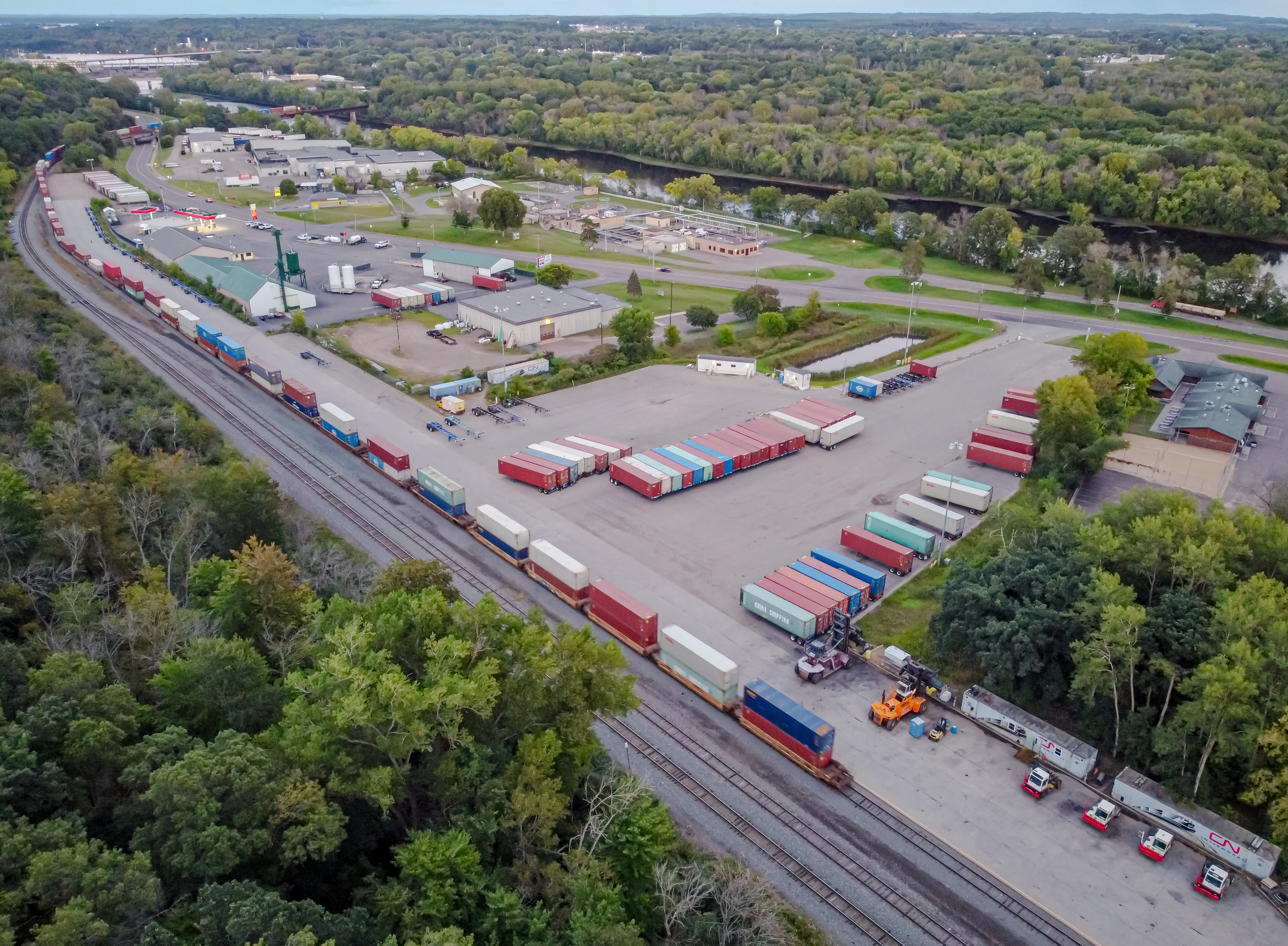
Small intermodal terminal in Chippewa Falls on the Canadian National line

As of 2011, the largest employers in the city were:

1	TTM Advanced Circuits
2	Chippewa Falls Public Schools
3	Saint Joseph's Hospital
4	Wal-Mart
5	Mason Companies Inc
6	Chippewa County
7	Silicon Graphics International
8	Cooperative Educational Service Agency #10
9	Cray Inc
10	Wissota Healthcare Regional Vent CT

== Infrastructure ==
Chippewa Falls is situated along U.S. Highway 53, Wisconsin Highways 124 and 178, and Bus. WIS 29. Other routes include Wisconsin Highway 29; and County Highways J, Q, S, and X. Public transit is demand responsive public transport and is operated by Running Inc.

== Education ==
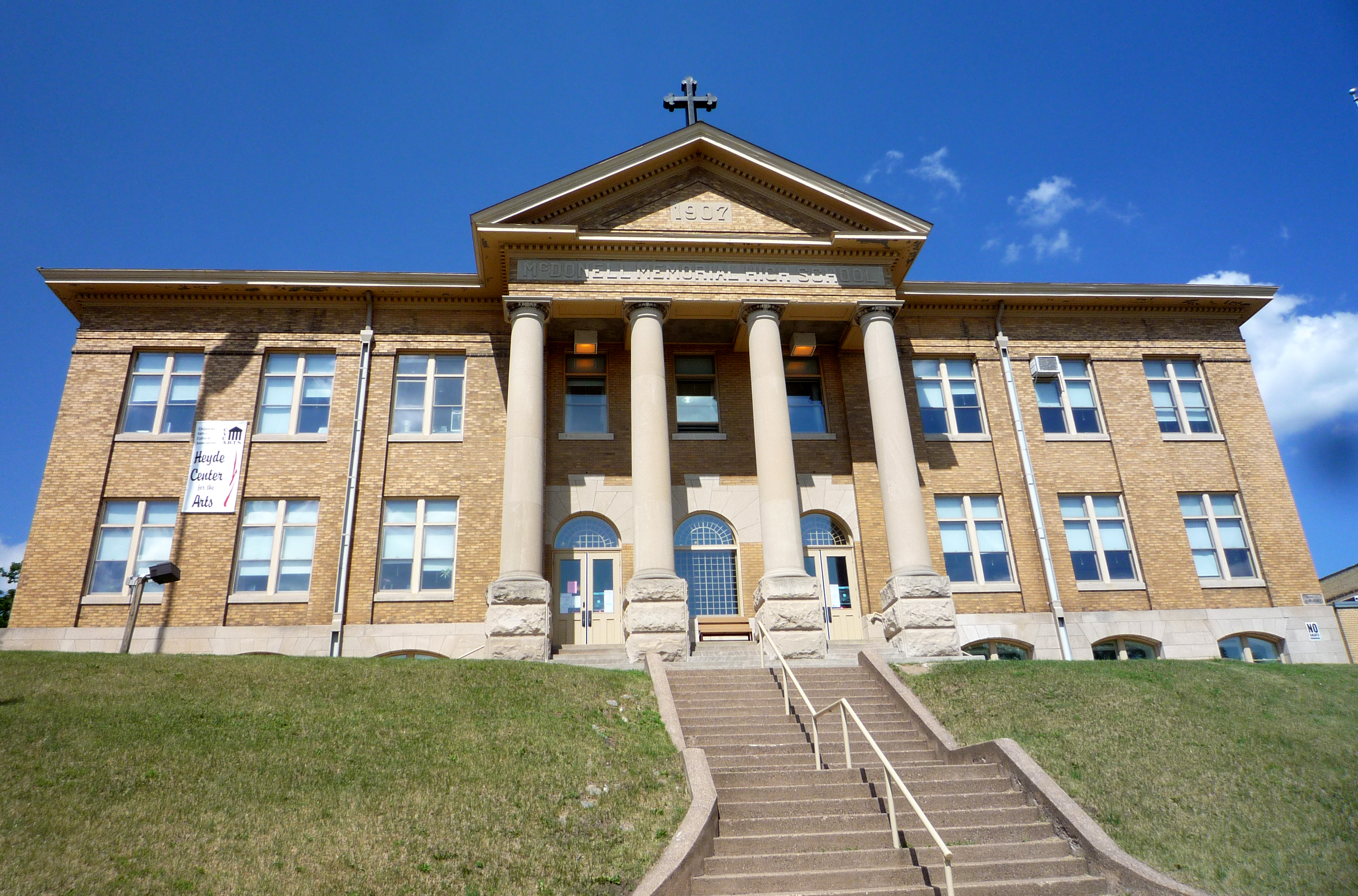
The original McDonell High School is now a public arts center.

The Chippewa Falls Area School District (CFSD) serves the city of Chippewa Falls. It has two high schools: Chippewa Falls Senior High and Chippewa Falls Alternate High School; two middle schools: Chippewa Falls Middle School, and Chippewa Falls Alternate Middle School; and six elementary schools: Parkview, Hillcrest, Southview, Stillson, Halmstad, and Jim Falls Elementary.

In addition there are several parochial schools: McDonell Central Catholic High School, Notre Dame Middle School, Holy Ghost, St. Charles, and St. Peter Elementary Schools, all of which are part of the McDonell Area Catholic Schools (MACS).

The original McDonell High School building, constructed at a prominent location above downtown Chippewa Falls, is listed on the State and National Register of Historic Places. The structure was built in 1907. After the high school was relocated to a new building in a more suburban location, this structure was vacant for several years. It was taken over by the Chippewa Valley Cultural Association and converted into the Heyde Center for the Arts in 2000.

== Notable people ==
=== Politicians ===
- Edward Ackley, member of the Wisconsin State Senate
- William B. Bartlett, member of the Wisconsin State Assembly
- Howard W. Cameron, member of the Wisconsin State Senate
- Wilder W. Crane, Jr., member of the Wisconsin State Assembly
- Gary Grant, member of the Washington House of Representatives
- Leo Richard Hamilton, member of the Wisconsin State Assembly
- Thomas S. Hogan, Montana Secretary of State
- John J. Jenkins, U.S. Representative
- Henry Laycock, member of the Wisconsin State Assembly
- Dick Leinenkugel, a politician and businessman with Leinenkugels. Served as the Wisconsin Secretary of Commerce under governor Jim Doyle
- Hector McRae, member of the Wisconsin State Assembly
- Charles F. Morris, member of the Wisconsin State Assembly
- Terry Moulton, a politician and member of the Wisconsin State Senate
- Arthur L. Padrutt, member of the Wisconsin State Senate
- Bruce Peloquin, member of the Wisconsin State Senate
- Bradley Phillips, member of the Wisconsin State Assembly
- Thaddeus C. Pound, U.S. Representative, grandfather of poet Ezra Pound
- Ingolf E. Rasmus, lawyer and member of the Wisconsin State Assembly
- Paul H. Raihle, author, lawyer, and member of the Wisconsin State Assembly
- Sylvia H. Raihle, homesteader and member of the Wisconsin State Assembly
- Marvin J. Roshell, member of the Wisconsin State Senate
- Lycurgus J. Rusk, member of the Wisconsin State Assembly
- Chuck Schafer, member of the Wisconsin State Assembly
- Tom Sykora, elected to Wisconsin State Assembly in 1994 and served until retirement in 2003
- John W. Thomas, member of the Wisconsin State Assembly
- Alexander Wiley, served four terms in the United States Senate for the state of Wisconsin from 1939 to 1963
- Terry A. Willkom, member of the Wisconsin State Assembly
- Cadwallader Jackson Wiltse, member of the Wisconsin State Assembly

=== Military ===
- Irving J. Carr, U.S. Army Major General
- Richard H. Cosgriff, Medal of Honor recipient
- Horace Ellis, Medal of Honor recipient
- George Clay Ginty, Union Army general
- James J. LeCleir, U.S. Air Force Major General
- Charles E. Mower, United States Army soldier and Medal of Honor recipient in World War II
- Dennis B. Sullivan, U.S. Air Force Brigadier General

=== Sports ===
- Leo Macdonell, sportswriter at the Detroit Times
- Moose Baxter, John Morris Baxter, former Major League Baseball player
- Chad Cascadden, National Football League linebacker for New York Jets and New England Patriots 1995–99
- Art Crews, professional wrestler, former Jail Captain with Chippewa County Sheriff's Department
- Nate DeLong, National Basketball Association player
- Charles E. "Gus" Dorais (1891–1954), quarterback and kicker for the University of Notre Dame; inducted in College Football Hall of Fame as a coach in 1954; head coach of Detroit Lions from 1943 to 1947
- Gene Ellenson, professional football player in 1946
- Joe Vavra, player for Los Angeles Dodgers, coach for Minnesota Twins; enshrined in Chi-Hi Athletic Hall of Fame on August 27, 2010

=== Law ===
- Russell G. Cleary, businessman and lawyer
- Thomas Eugene Grady, Justice of the Washington Supreme Court
- Donald F. Turner, lawyer and economist, Assistant Attorney General in charge of USDOJ's Antitrust Division under President Lyndon Baines Johnson

=== Other ===
- Andrew S. Cray, LGBT Rights Activist
- Seymour Cray (1925–1996), electrical engineer and supercomputer architect who founded Cray Research
- Wayne A. Grudem (born 1948), New Testament scholar, theologian, seminary professor, and author.
- Judy Henske, singer and songwriter, "Queen of the Beatniks"; songs about Chippewa roots include "The Ballad of Seymour Cray"
- William F. Kirk (1877–1927), nationally syndicated columnist, poet, songwriter, humorist and baseball writer
- Howard "Guitar" Luedtke, blues guitarist, singer, songwriter and musician who tours with his band, Howard "Guitar" Luedtke & Blue Max
- Grace Reiter, (born 2001), actress, comedian, writer, director, and content creator.
- Eddy Waller (1889–1977), actor who appeared in over 200 films between 1929 and 1963

== In popular culture ==
- In the 1977 film Annie Hall, Chippewa Falls is mentioned as being the hometown of Annie Hall (played by Diane Keaton).
- In the 1997 film Titanic, Chippewa Falls is mentioned as being the hometown of Jack Dawson (played by Leonardo DiCaprio).
- In the 2007 mockumentary comedy film Cook Off!, starring Melissa McCarthy and Wendi McLendon-Covey, a character mentions buying a house in Chippewa Falls.
- In the 1995 Film "Tommy Boy" a road sign for Chippewa Falls is seen during a roadside fight.

== Important structures ==
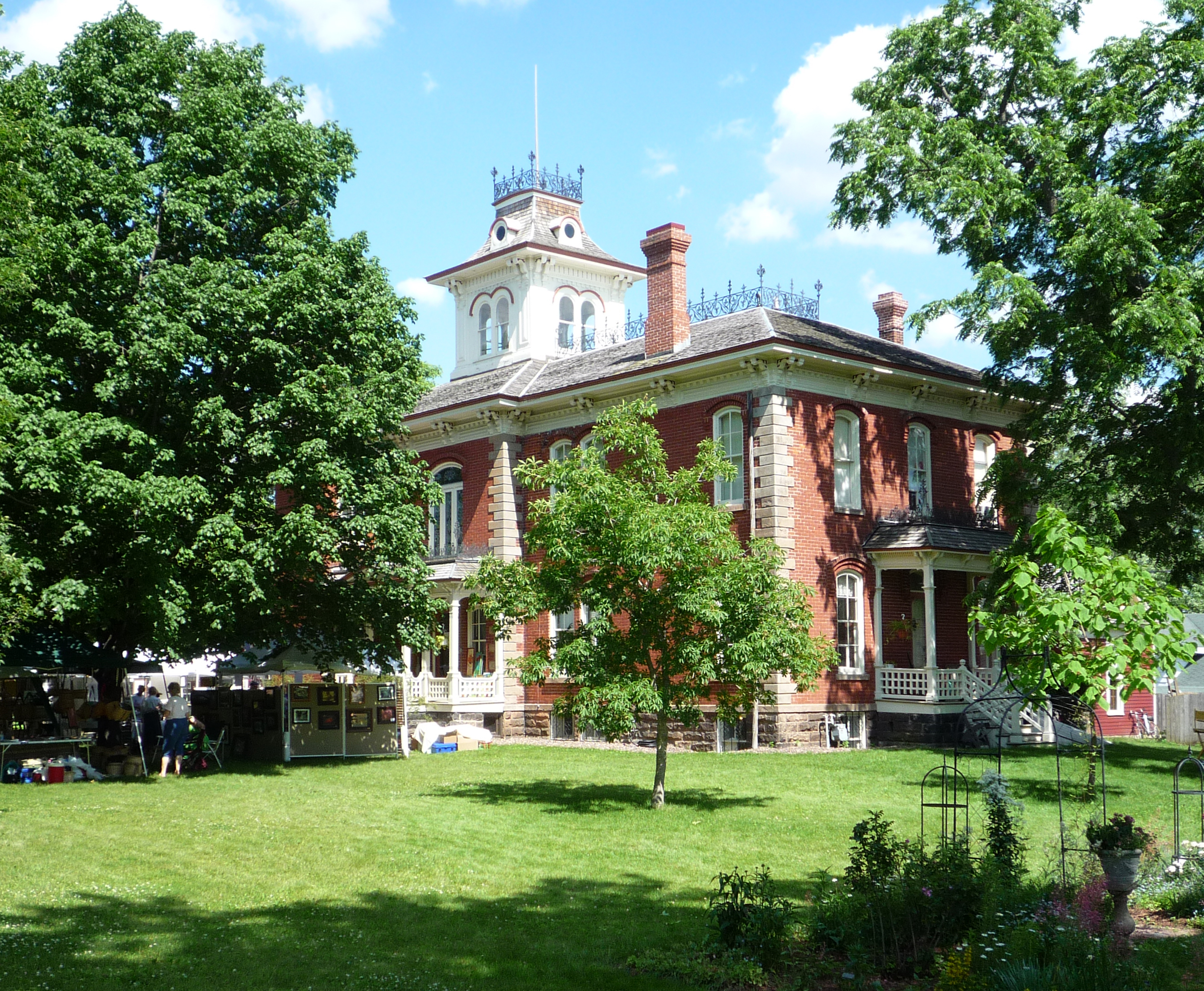
The Cook-Rutledge House is on the National Register of Historic Places.

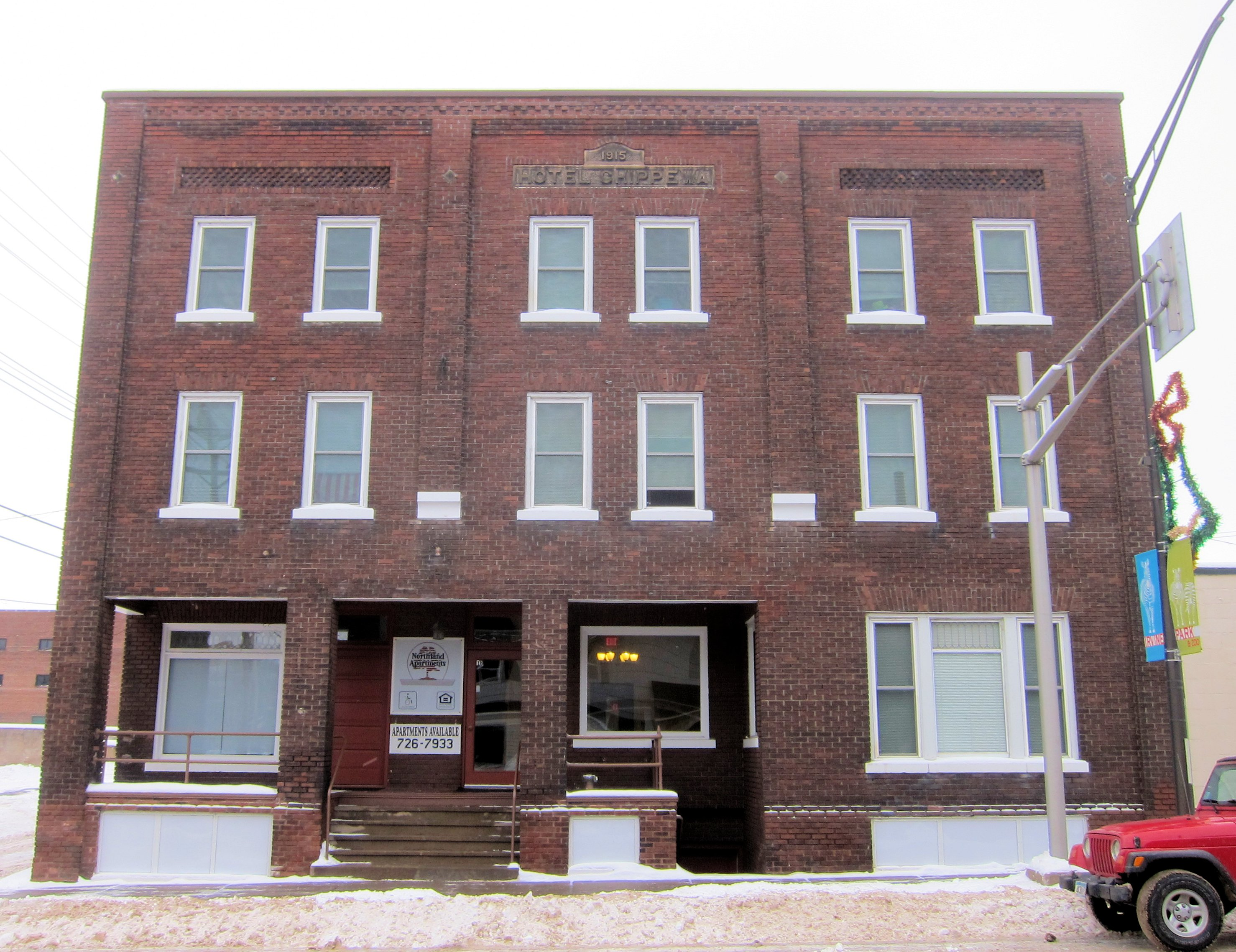
Hotel Chippewa is on the National Register of Historic Places.

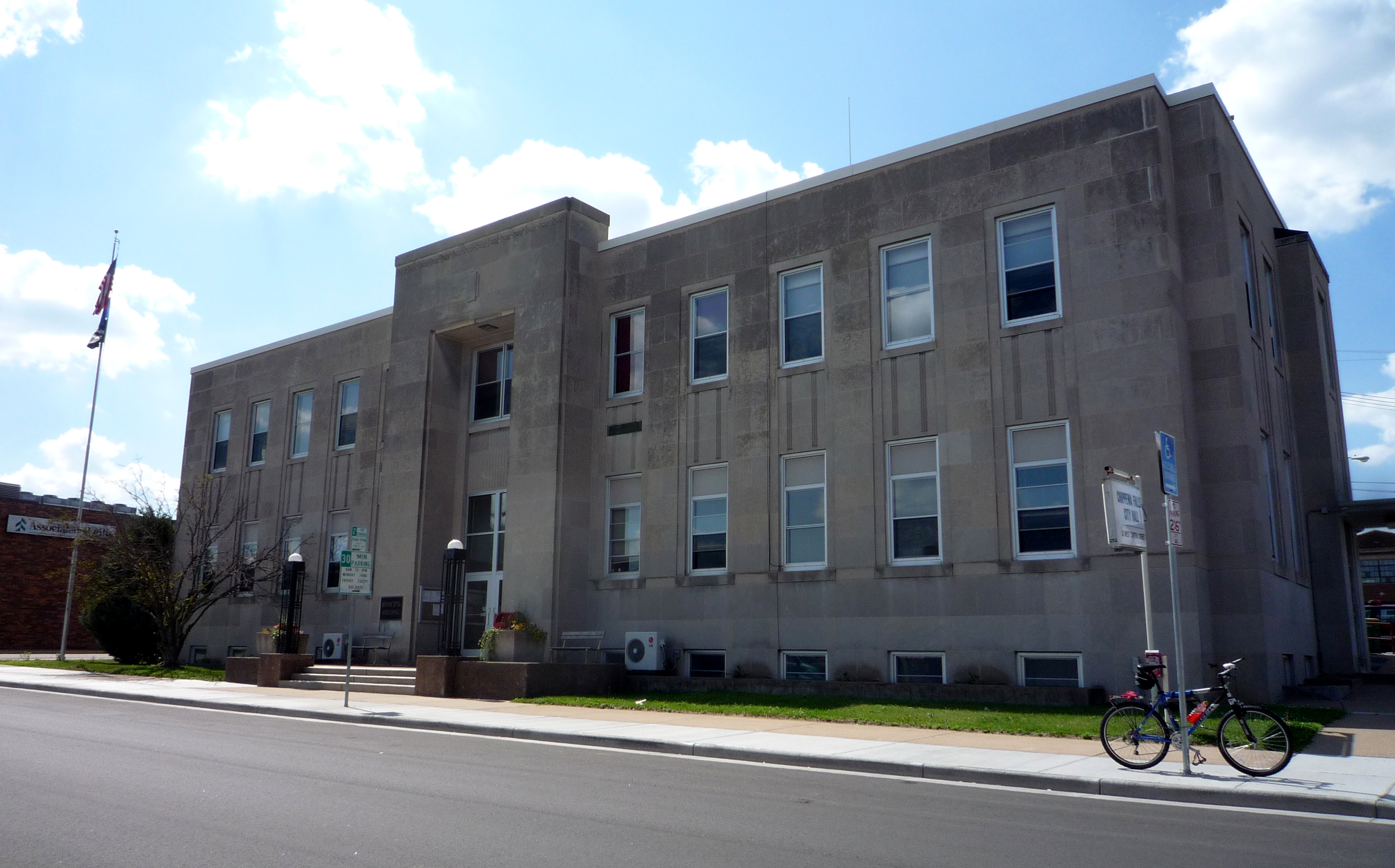
Municipal Building

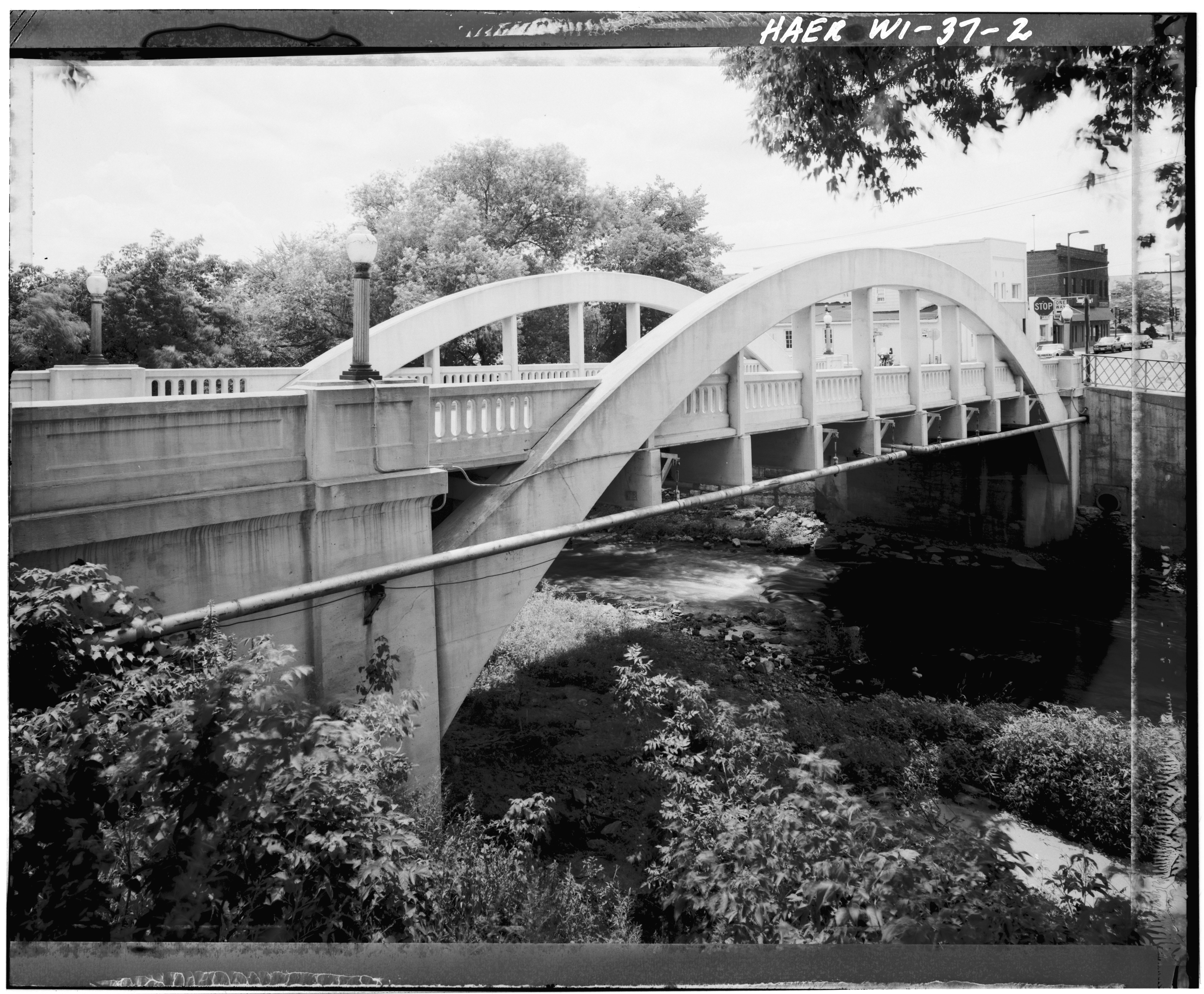
Spring Street Bridge Chippewa Falls, WI

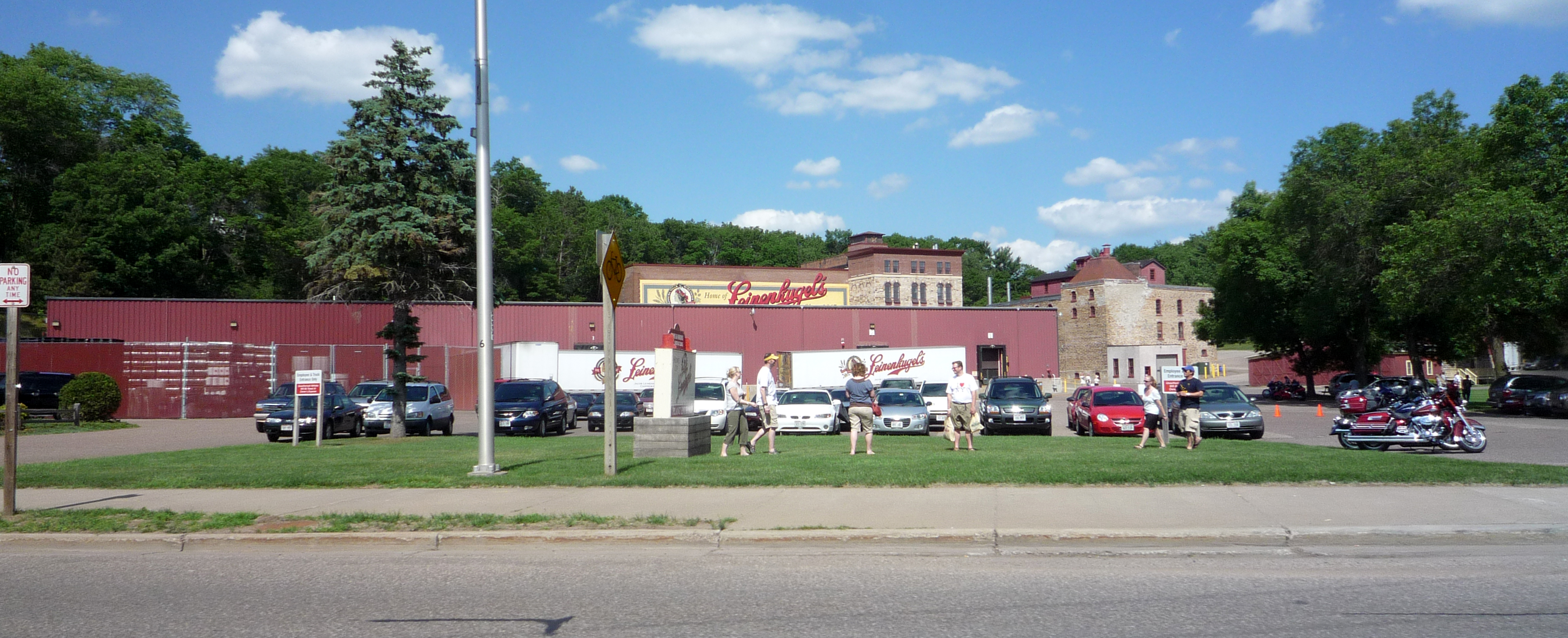
Jacob Leinenkugel Brewing Company brewery.

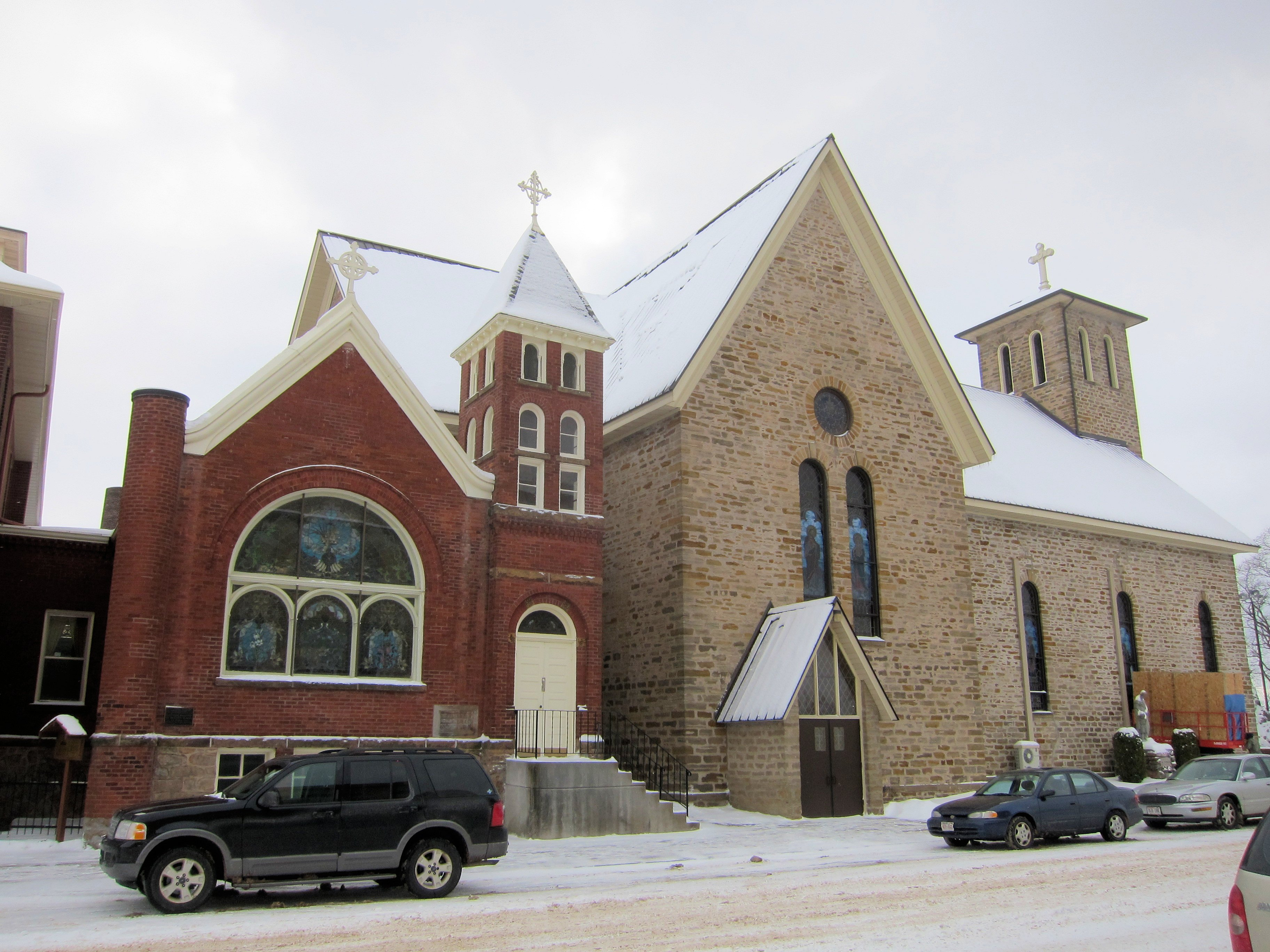
Notre Dame Church and Goldsmith Memorial Chapel is on the National Register of Historic Places.
