= House at 913 2nd =

- U.S. National Register of Historic Places
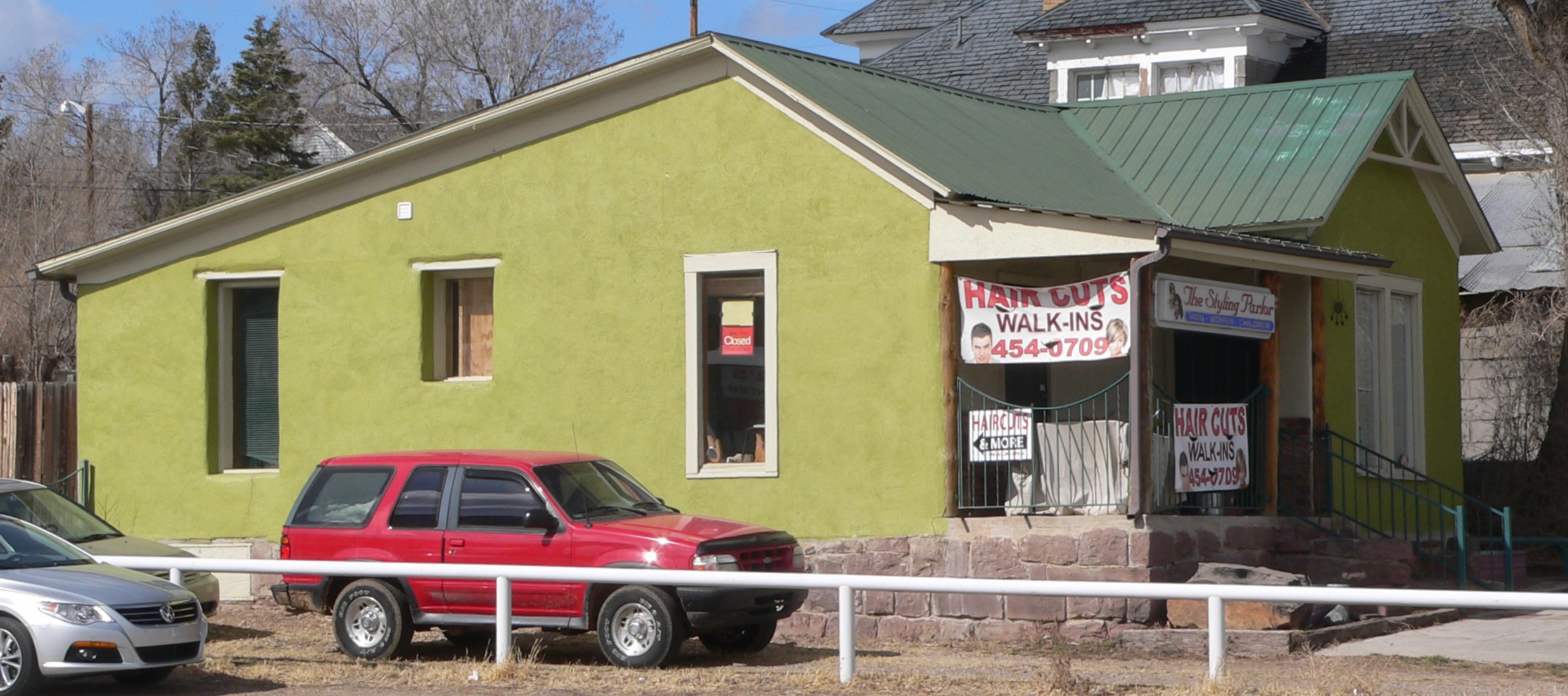

- Location within New Mexico
- Location: 913 2nd, Las Vegas, New Mexico
- Coordinates: 35.600405°N 105.213114°W
- Area: less than one acre
- Built: c.1885
- Architectural style: Wood Vernacular
- MPS: Las Vegas New Mexico MRA
- NRHP reference No.: 85002597
- Added to NRHP: September 26, 1985

The House at 913 2nd, in Las Vegas, New Mexico, was built around 1885. It was listed on the National Register of Historic Places in 1985.

It is a wood frame and adobe house with a stucco exterior, built upon a random ashlar sandstone foundation. It has lathe-turned porch columns and railing, and stickwork in its gable. The front portion, built around 1885, "is a very good, unaltered example of the L-shape variety of the Wood Vernacular house type"; the rear portion of adobe was added soon after.

This is one of three adjacent houses, with House at 915 2nd and House at 919 2nd, listed together on the New Mexico state historic register and on the National Register, which all face upon the Second Street Triangle Park (listed on the state register, which is a triangular park), and beyond that U.S. Route 85 and some commercial buildings. They are located just northeast of the North New Town Historic District.

Together they "present a still-coherent piece of the historic fabric. They developed as a modest residential park like Library Park before the designation of U.S. 85 turned Grand Avenue into a major thoroughfare."
