= House at 915 2nd =

- U.S. National Register of Historic Places
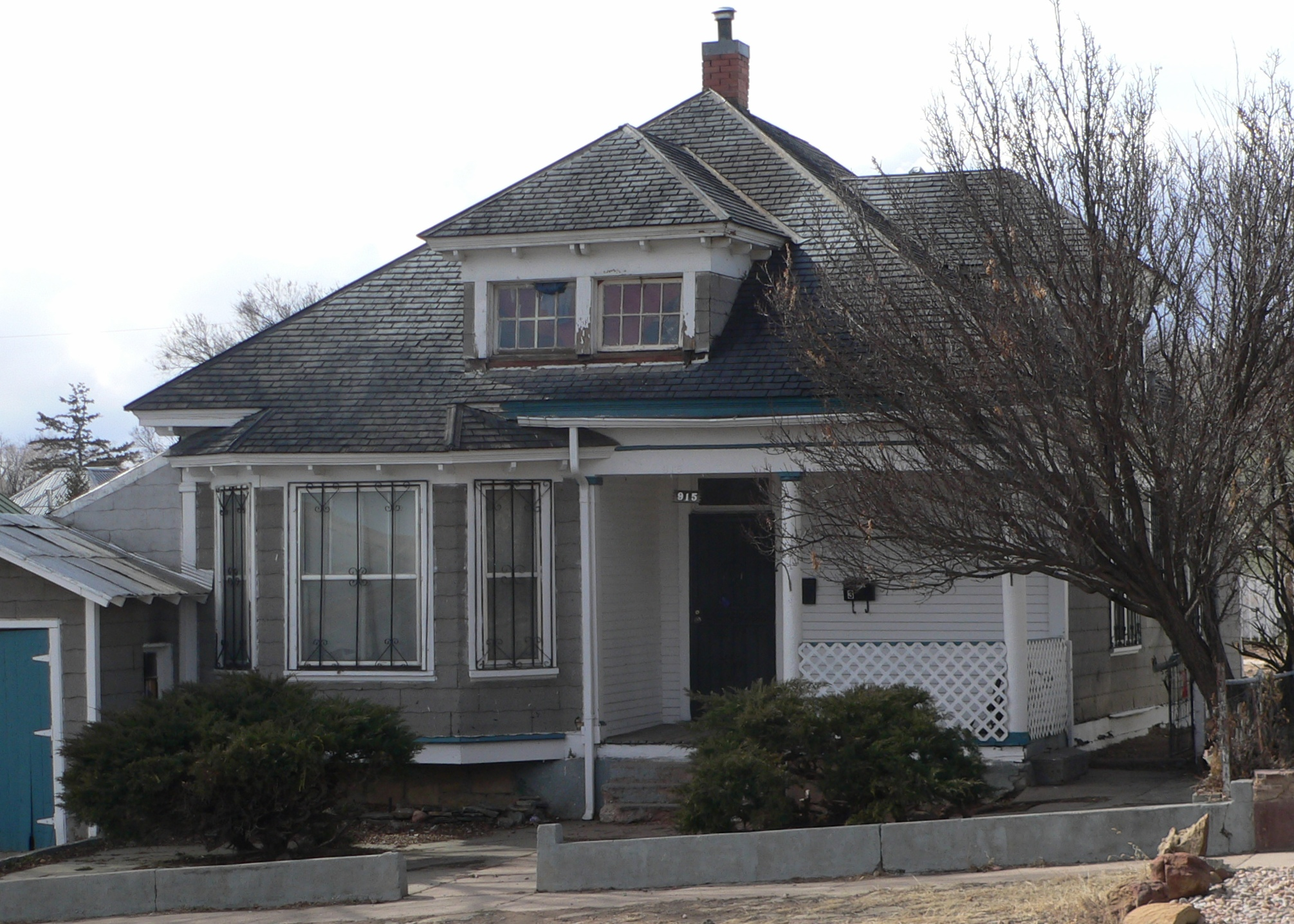

- Location within New Mexico
- Location: 915 2nd, Las Vegas, New Mexico
- Coordinates: 35.600530°N 105.213212°W
- Area: less than one acre
- Built: c.1885
- Architectural style: Free Classic
- MPS: Las Vegas New Mexico MRA
- NRHP reference No.: 85002596
- Added to NRHP: September 26, 1985

The House at 915 2nd, in Las Vegas, New Mexico, was built around 1885. It was listed on the National Register of Historic Places in 1985.

It is a wood-frame house with wood shingles upon a hipped roof and dormers. It has small enclosed eaves with wooden modillions. End boards are treated as pilasters. It has symmetrical hipped roofs which combine with asymmetry from its bay and porch to make it "a modest but well done example of the local Free Classic style."

Its house plan was used for this house, for the House at 919 2nd adjacent to the north, and, in mirror-flipped version, for a North New Town Historic District house (#455).

It is one of three houses, along with House at 913 2nd and House at 919 2nd, which together face a triangular park and were nominated for historic registry listing together.
