= House at 919 2nd =

- U.S. National Register of Historic Places
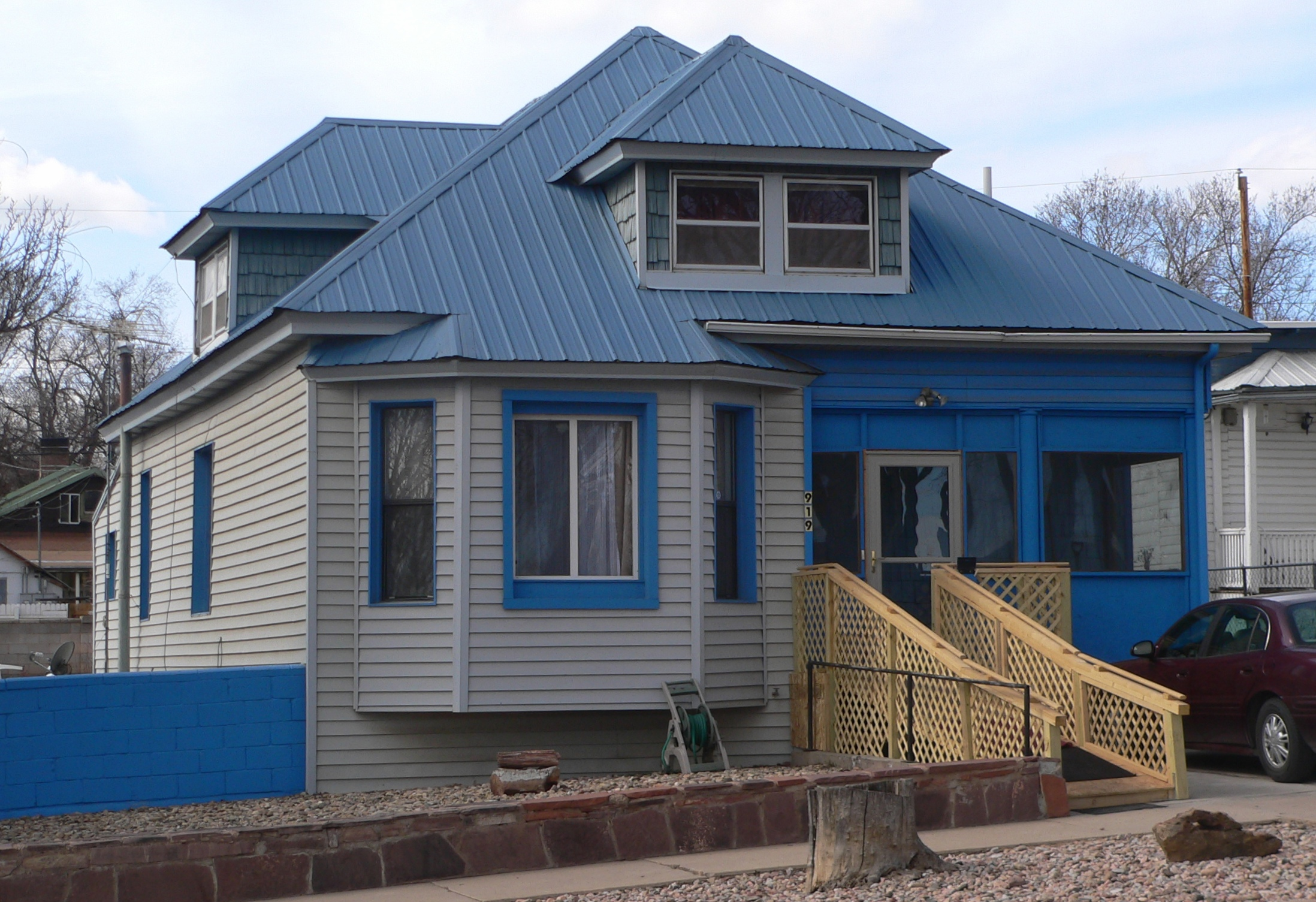

- Location within New Mexico
- Location: 919 2nd, Las Vegas, New Mexico
- Coordinates: 35.600638°N 105.213289°W
- Area: less than one acre
- Built: 1885
- Architectural style: Free Classic
- MPS: Las Vegas New Mexico MRA
- NRHP reference No.: 85002595
- Added to NRHP: September 26, 1985

The House at 919 2nd in Las Vegas, New Mexico was built around 1885. It was listed on the National Register of Historic Places in 1985.

It is a wood-frame house with stucco over original clapboard or other exterior surfaces. It has a hipped roof and small enclosed eaves with some modillion brackets, though some eave brackets have been removed. It has "lumberyard classic columns" and a "folk porch railing".

It is the northernmost of three historic houses (along with House at 913 2nd and House at 915 2nd) facing a triangular park which were together nominated for National Register listing, and its significance is that same as for the nearly identical house next door (Building #294).
