= Library Park Historic District (Las Vegas, New Mexico) =

- U.S. National Register of Historic Places
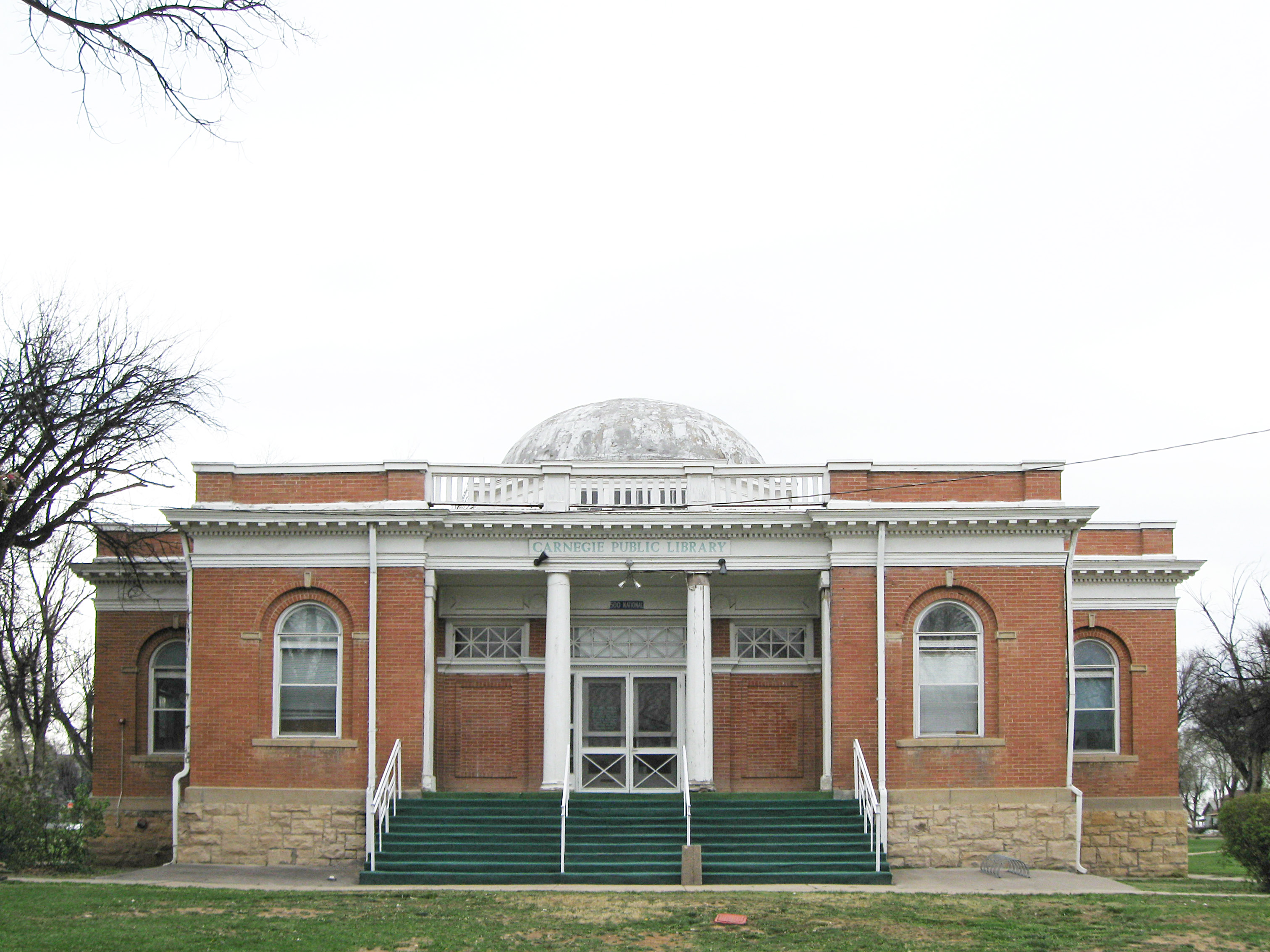

- Location within New Mexico
- Location: Liberty Park and environs, Las Vegas, New Mexico
- Coordinates: 35°35′52″N 105°12′52″W
- Area: 14 acres (5.7 ha)
- Built: 1882
- Architect: Isaac H. Rapp et al.
- Architectural style: Classical Revival, Late Victorian, Mixed (more Than 2 Styles From Different Periods)
- MPS: Las Vegas New Mexico MRA (AD)
- NRHP reference No.: 79001549
- Added to NRHP: March 12, 1979

The Library Park Historic District in Las Vegas, New Mexico, was listed on the National Register of Historic Places in 1979. The listing included 21 contributing buildings and a contributing structure on 14 acres (5.7 ha).

It includes a Carnegie library, the Carnegie Public Library of Las Vegas, which is a cross-plan red brick Classical Revival building with a center dome and a porticoed entrance, designed by architects Isaac H. Rapp and William M. Rapp.

It includes the Immaculate Conception Church (1949), at the southwest corner of the library park, a creme brick Latin cross plan Gothic Revival-style church which was designed by Les J. Wolmagood.

It includes the parish house next door to the church, at 811 6th Street, which is a stuccoed frame house.

It includes 807 N. National, a small gable-front stucco house.

It includes a Gothic cottage at the southwest corner of 6th and National, dating probably to around 1880.
