= North New Town Historic District =

Historic district in New Mexico, United States

- U.S. National Register of Historic Places
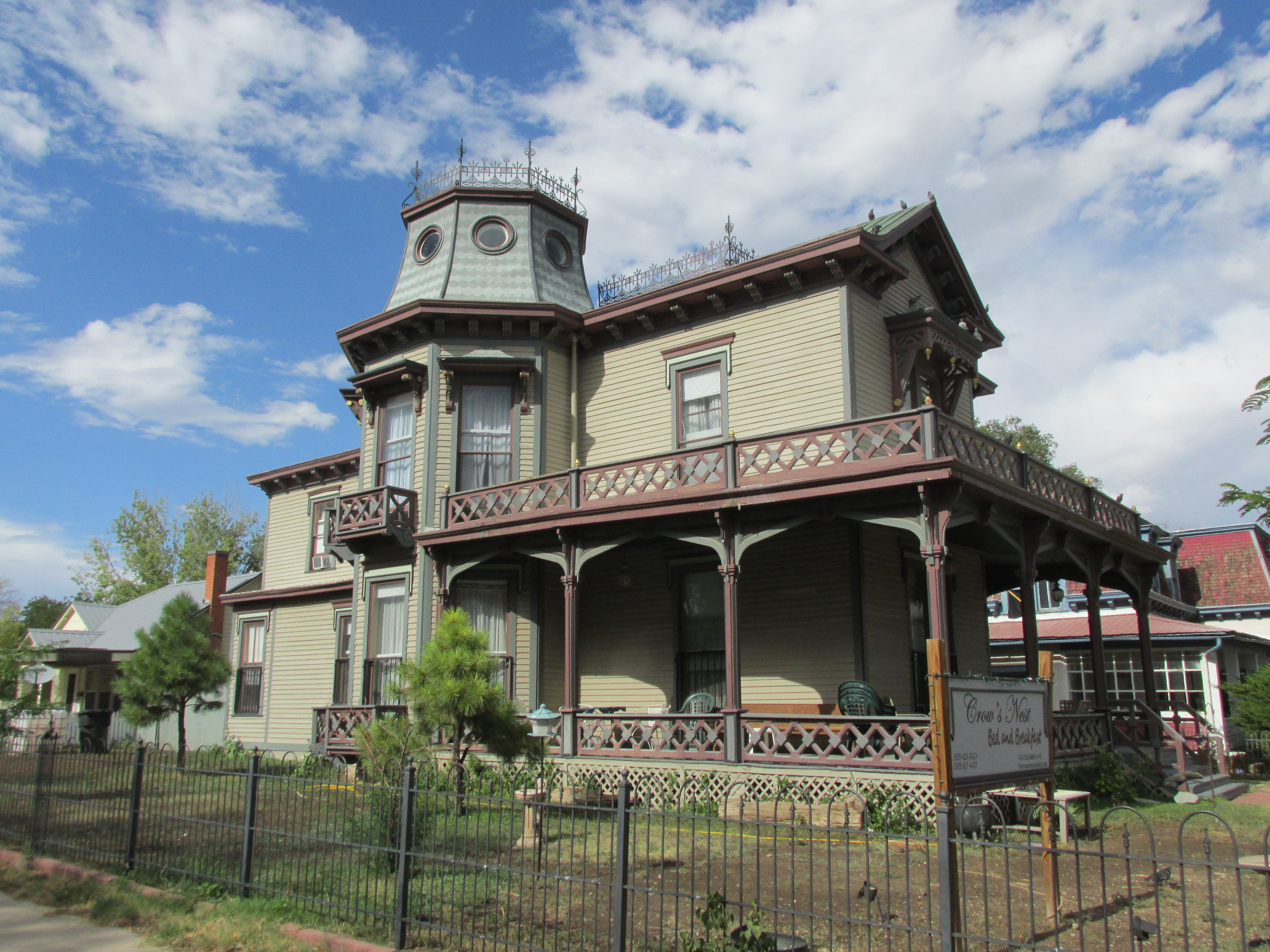

- Location within New Mexico
- Location: Roughly bounded by National, Friedman, 3rd and 8th Sts., Las Vegas, New Mexico
- Coordinates: 35°35′58″N 105°13′05″W
- Area: 80 acres (32 ha)
- Built: 1879
- Architect: Multiple
- Architectural style: Bungalow/craftsman, Late Victorian, Free Classic
- MPS: Las Vegas New Mexico MRA (AD)
- NRHP reference No.: 83001627
- Added to NRHP: August 18, 1983

The North New Town Historic District, in Las Vegas, New Mexico, is a historic district which was listed on the National Register of Historic Places in 1983.

The district included 225 contributing buildings in an 80 acres (32 ha) area, about 15 city blocks. The area runs roughly from National to Friedman, and form the alley between 2nd and 3rd to the alley between 8th and 9th Streets in Las Vegas.

It includes Bungalow/craftsman, Late Victorian, and Free Classic architecture.
