= Paavo Nurmi Marathon =

Annual road running event in Wisconsin, USA

Coordinates: 46°27′00″N 90°11′03″W

- Date: August
- Location: Iron County, Wisconsin
- Event type: marathon
- Established: 1969
- Website: https://www.thepaavo.org/

The Paavo Nurmi Marathon is an annual road running event held each August in Iron County, Wisconsin, in the United States. The course begins in the town of Upson and continues along Highway 77 through the communities of Iron Belt, Pence and Montreal. Near Carey, the race turns down County Highway C, clips past the Gile Flowage and proceeds along U.S. Route 51 into the city of Hurley. The finish line is located on Silver Street in Hurley, where the race finishers are served a traditional Finnish stew called Mojakka.

The Paavo Nurmi was established in 1969 and is considered to be the oldest running marathon in Wisconsin. The 2020 and 2021 runnings of the Paavo Nurmi Marathon were cancelled due to the COVID-19 pandemic.

As of 2023, the record for the event stands at 2:19.10, set by Richard Wilde of England in 1978. The women's record is held by Mary Bange of La Crosse, Wisconsin, in a time of 2:47.49, set in 1979.

Another marathon bearing the same name has been held since 1991 in Paavo Nurmi's birth city of Turku, Finland.
