= U.S. Route 2 in Wisconsin =

U.S. Highway in Wisconsin

U.S. Highway 2
- Major Richard I. Bong Memorial Highway
- US 2 highlighted in red

Route information
- Maintained by WisDOT
- Length: 118.95 mi (191.43 km)
- Existed: November 26, 1926–present
- History: Designated in 1917 as WIS 18 and 34
- Tourist routes: Lake Superior Circle Tour

Western segment
- Length: 104.49 mi (168.16 km)
- West end: US 2 in Superior
- Major intersections: US 53 in Superior; US 53 in Amnicon; US 63 in Moquah; US 51 in Hurley
- East end: US 2 in Hurley

Eastern segment
- Length: 14.46 mi (23.27 km)
- West end: US 2 / US 141 in Florence
- East end: US 2 / US 141 in Spread Eagle

Location
- Country: United States
- State: Wisconsin
- Counties: Douglas, Bayfield, Ashland, Iron; Florence

Highway system
- United States Numbered Highway System; List; Special; Divided; Wisconsin State Trunk Highway System; Interstate; US; State; Scenic; Rustic
← I-894	→ US 8

US Highway 2 (US 2) is a part of the United States Numbered Highway System that runs from Everett, Washington, to St. Ignace, Michigan. In Wisconsin, the highway enters runs east–west across the northwestern part of the state and re-enters the state in the northeast part. It runs from the Richard I. Bong Memorial Bridge over the Saint Louis Bay at Superior, where it enters from Minnesota, east to the Michigan state line near Hurley. Further east, US 2 re-enters Wisconsin from Michigan in Florence County and briefly traverses that county before re-entering Michigan. US 2 is a Wisconsin Corridors 2020 Connecting route east of its concurrency with US 53. The section concurrent with US 53 is a Wisconsin Corridors 2020 Backbone route.

== Route description ==
=== Western segment ===
US 2 enters the state from Minnesota at the city of Superior on the Bong Memorial Bridge. US 2 then follows Belknap Street eastbound, passing through downtown Superior, where it has an intersection with Wisconsin Highway 35 (WIS 35). US 2 then continues east for 1.7 miles (2.7 km) to its intersection with US 53. At this point, the two highways then run concurrently southeasterly on a four-lane surface street (East 2nd Street) for 5 miles (8.0 km). After the intersection with Moccasin Mike Road, a seven-mile (11 km) freeway segment begins for US 2/US 53 as the highway leaves the city of Superior together. US 2/US 53 has an interchange with WIS 13 near Parkland; WIS 13 begins its course around the Lake Superior shoreline at this point. US 2 and US 53 split in South Range at an unusual interchange at which westbound US 2 traffic must cross over the freeway to the eastbound lanes to access US 53 south. US 2 then continues independently again as a two-lane road, passing through Wentworth, Poplar, and Maple as it heads east to the Douglas–Bayfield county line at Brule. Just west of Brule, US 2 crosses the Brule River State Forest.

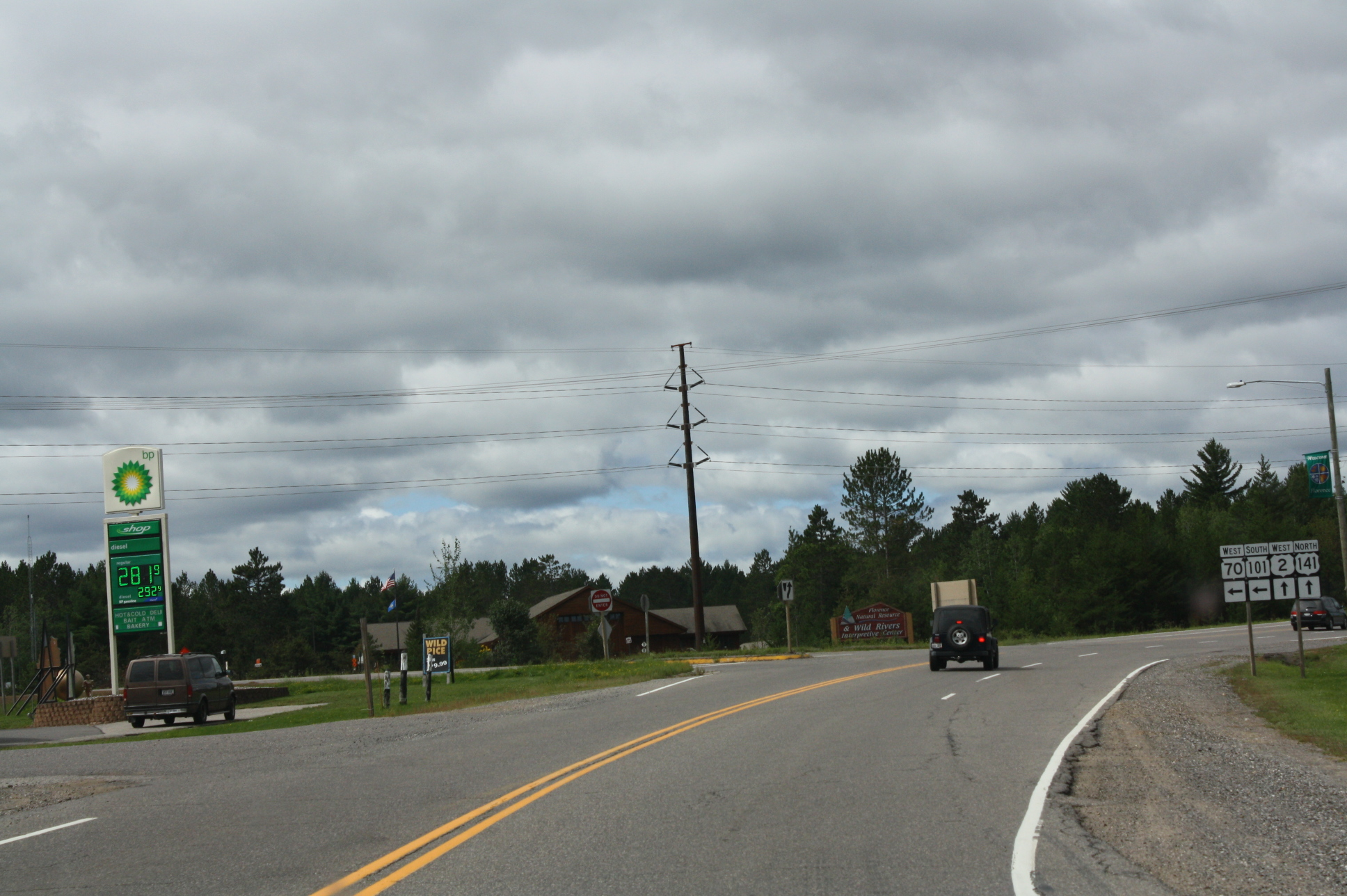
US 2 at the eastern terminus of Wisconsin Highway 70 in Florence

In Bayfield County, US 2 passes through Iron River then proceeds east-southeasterly through the Chequamegon National Forest and to Ino where it turns east and meets US 63's northern terminus at about six miles (9.7 km) east of Ino. US 2 turns northeastward and meets WIS 13, which joins it eastbound as they follow the Lake Superior shoreline closely to the Ashland County line and the City of Ashland. WIS 13 turns south in downtown Ashland while US 2 follows the lakeshore northeastward and turns east at the city limit and proceeds to Odanah and turns southeastward to the Iron County line. the highway junctions with WIS 169 two miles (3.2 km) east of the county line then turns eastward to Saxon where it crosses WIS 122. US 2 then continues east, then southeast toward Hurley where it meets US 51 at its northern terminus and immediately enters Michigan, continuing for 109.18 miles (175.71 km)

=== Eastern segment ===
US 2 re-enters Wisconsin from Iron County, Michigan concurrently with US 141 and turns southeastward to Florence and intersects WIS 70/WIS 101 at their shared terminus. After a short trek through Florence via Central Avenue, Furnace Street and Florence Avenue, the highway turns south and passes by Commonwealth then turns east and passes through the community of Spread Eagle. The highway returns into Michigan three miles (4.8 km) east of Spread Eagle.

== History ==
In 1918, the western segment of US 2 was old WIS 10 with the exception of the short segment between US 51 and the Michigan state line, which was not a part of the state highway system until Michigan signed their trunkline system a year later. The entire eastern segment was designated as old WIS 69 in 1918. One business route existed for US 2 until 2002. Business US 2 began at the US 51 terminus and headed southeast to WIS 77 in downtown Hurley where it turned east into Michigan. Although Michigan still has the route signed, Wisconsin removed its signs. The street in Hurley that runs from WIS 77 to the border is still a state trunkline despite not having a numbered designation.

In the 2020s, the entire US 2 corridor was designated as an Alternative Fuel Corridor for electric vehicles.

== Major intersections ==
County	Location	mi	km	Destinations	Notes
Douglas	Superior	0.00	0.00	US 2 west / LSCT (Bong Bridge) – Duluth	Continuation into Minnesota
Douglas	Superior			Truck US 2 east (Garfield Avenue)	Western end of Truck US 2
Douglas	Superior	2.24	3.60	WIS 35 (Tower Avenue)	
Douglas	Superior	3.95	6.36	US 53 north (2nd Street) / Truck US 2 west	Northern end of US 53 concurrency
Douglas	Superior	8.70	14.00	Northern end of freeway	
Douglas	Town of Parkland	10.58	17.03	WIS 13 south / LSCT east – Port Wing, Bayfield	Eastern end of LSCT concurrency
Douglas	Town of Amnicon	15.30	24.62	US 53 south – Spooner, Eau Claire	Southern end of US 53 concurrency; southern end of freeway along US 2
Douglas	Community of Brule	32.47	52.26	WIS 27 south – Hayward	
Bayfield	Keystone–Eileen town line	58.31	93.84	US 63 south – Hayward	
Bayfield	Town of Eileen	61.37	98.77	WIS 137 east / Alt. US 2 east / Alt. WIS 13 south – Ashland	
Bayfield	Town of Barksdale	64.12	103.19	WIS 13 north / LSCT west – Washburn, Bayfield	Western end of WIS 13/LSCT concurrency
Ashland	Ashland			WIS 112 / Alt. US 2 west – Sanborn	
Ashland	Ashland	67.75	109.03	WIS 13 south – Mellen	Eastern end of WIS 13 concurrency
Iron	Town of Gurney	88.68	142.72	WIS 169 south – Mellen	
Iron	Town of Saxon	93.33	150.20	WIS 122 – Upson	
Iron	Hurley	104.33	167.90	US 51 south – Hurley	Northern terminus of US 51
Iron	Hurley	104.49	168.16	US 2 east / LSCT east – Ironwood	US 2 enters Michigan
US 2 enters Michigan for 109.177 miles (175.703 km)
Florence	Town of Florence	104.59	168.32	US 2 west / US 141 north – Crystal Falls	
Florence	Community of Florence	108.40	174.45	WIS 70 west / WIS 101 south – Armstrong Creek, Eagle River	
Florence	Town of Florence	118.95	191.43	US 2 east / US 141 south – Iron Mountain	Continuation into Michigan
1.000 mi = 1.609 km; 1.000 km = 0.621 mi: Concurrency terminus

== See also ==
U.S. Route 2
Previous state: Minnesota	Wisconsin	Next state: Michigan
Previous state: Michigan	Wisconsin	Next state: Michigan
