= Wisconsin Highway 122 =

State highway in Iron County, Wisconsin,, United States

State Trunk Highway 122
- WIS 122 highlighted in red

Route information
- Maintained by WisDOT
- Length: 14.69 mi (23.64 km)

Major junctions
- South end: WIS 77 in Upson
- US 2 / LSCT in Saxon
- North end: CR 505 in Saxon

Location
- Country: United States
- State: Wisconsin
- Counties: Iron

Highway system
- Wisconsin State Trunk Highway System; Interstate; US; State; Scenic; Rustic
← WIS 121	→ WIS 123

State Trunk Highway 122 (often called Highway 122, STH-122 or WIS 122) is a 14.69-mile-long (23.64 km) state highway in the US state of Wisconsin. It runs north–south from WIS 77 in Upson to the Michigan border near Saxon; the route is located entirely within Iron County. WIS 122 is maintained by the Wisconsin Department of Transportation (WisDOT).

== Route description ==
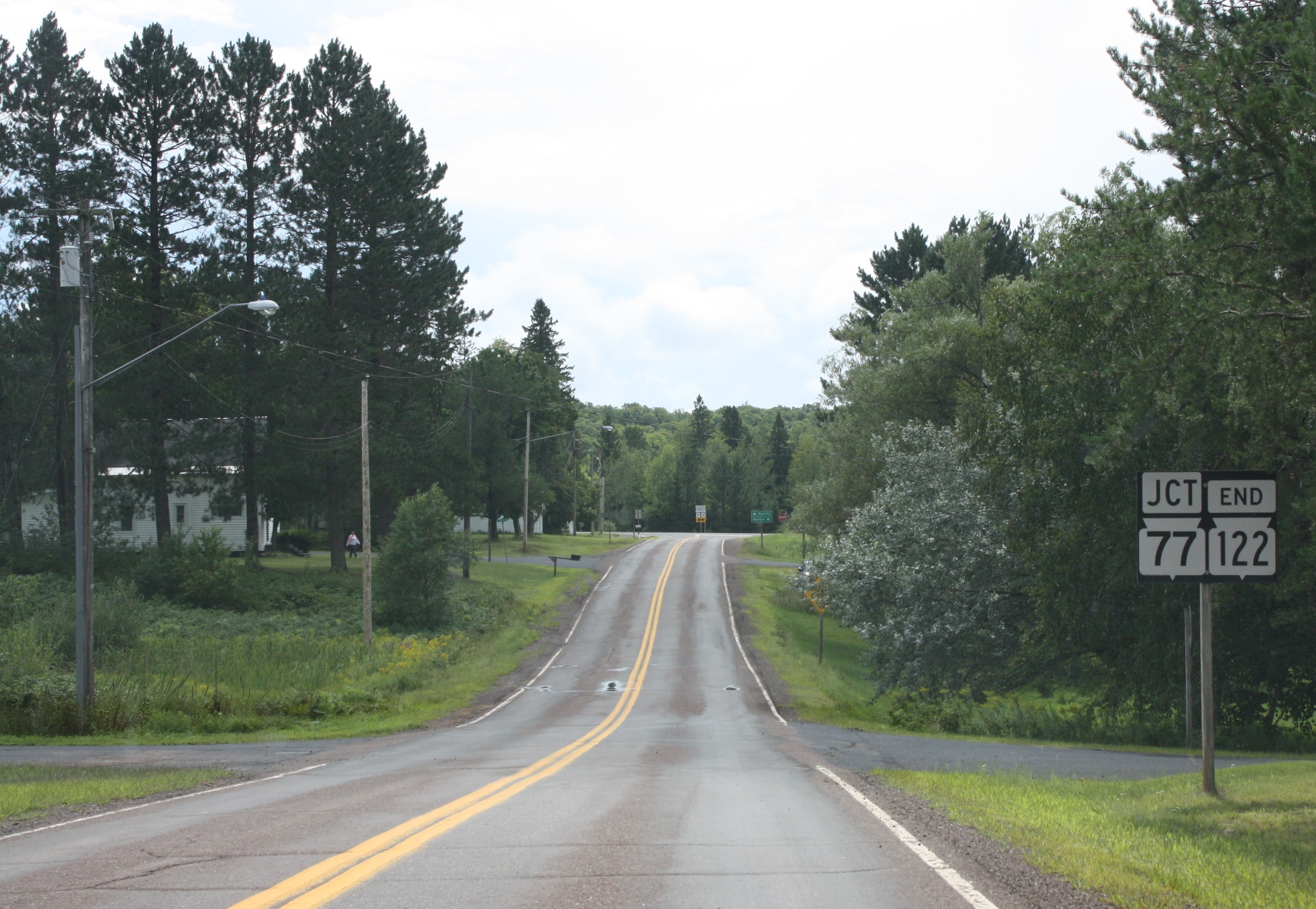
Southern terminus in Upson

WIS 122 begins at a junction with WIS 77 in the unincorporated community of Upson, Wisconsin. The highway heads northward through the town of Anderson. The route passes through a forested area and intersects County Trunk Highway E (CTH-E) before curving around Weber Lake.

After passing the lake to the north, WIS 122 enters the Town of Saxon. It continues northward through the community of Saxon, meeting CTH-B and crossing a Canadian National railroad line within the community. The roadway intersects US Highway 2 (US 2) north of the community and continues northward to another intersection with CTH-B. At this point, WIS 122 briefly turns to the northwest before heading north to a junction with CTH-A. The route then turns to the northeast and ends at the Montreal River, which marks the Michigan state line. WIS 122 is one of two Wisconsin state highways, along with WIS 17, which terminate at the Michigan state line and are not continued as state highways in Michigan.

== History ==
The first highway designated as WIS 122 connected WIS 18 (now WIS 96) west of Appleton to WIS 15 in Greenville; CTH-GV and WIS 15 now run along this route. In 1923, WIS 122 moved to its current alignment between Upson and US 2; it was extended to the Michigan state line in 1928 or 1929.

== Major intersections ==
The entire highway is in Iron County.

Location	mi	km	Destinations	Notes
Upson	0.00	0.00	WIS 77 – Mellen, Hurley	
Community of Saxon	10.40	16.74	US 2 / LSCT – Ashland, Ironwood	
Town of Saxon	14.69	23.64	CR 505 (Lake Road)	Michigan state line
1.000 mi = 1.609 km; 1.000 km = 0.621 mi
