= National Register of Historic Places listings in Iron County, Wisconsin =

Location of Iron County in Wisconsin

This is a list of the National Register of Historic Places listings in Iron County, Wisconsin. It is intended to provide a comprehensive listing of entries in the National Register of Historic Places that are located in Iron County, Wisconsin. The locations of National Register properties for which the latitude and longitude coordinates are included below may be seen in a map.

There are 5 properties and districts listed on the National Register in the county.

This National Park Service list is complete through NPS recent listings posted March 21, 2025.

== Current listings ==
	Name on the Register	Image	Date listed	Location	City or town	Description
1	Annala Round Barn	Annala Round Barn	August 27, 1979 (#79000085)	S of Hurley; 46°25′05″N 90°09′41″W	Hurley	Round barn and round milkhouse built of fieldstones in 1917 by Finnish stonemason Matt Annala.
2	Montreal Company Location Historic District	Montreal Company Location Historic District	May 23, 1980 (#80000141)	WI 77; 46°25′35″N 90°13′50″W	Montreal	The Montreal Mining Company built a planned community for employees in the first few decades of the 20th century, including arrays of homes for workers, the mine's machine shop, the Hamilton Club, the Roosevelt school, community gardens, and Sacred Heart of Jesus Catholic Church.
3	Old Iron County Courthouse	Old Iron County Courthouse	July 26, 1977 (#77000031)	303 Iron St. 46°26′52″N 90°10′59″W	Hurley	1893 courthouse with a 1922 Seth Thomas clockworks.
4	Plummer Mine Headframe	Plummer Mine Headframe	September 24, 1997 (#97001141)	0.25 mi (0.40 km). W of jct. of Plummer Mine Rd. and WI 77; 46°24′25″N 90°17′31″W	Pence	Headframe from which miners were lowered into a 2367 foot iron mine that operated from 1904 to 1924. Now the last headframe standing in Wisconsin.
5	Springstead	Springstead	April 17, 1997 (#97000326)	Jct. of Old Springfield Tote Rd. and WI 182; 46°01′17″N 90°07′26″W	Sherman	Habitation on Stone Lake, where Chippewas once made maple sugar and where French Canadians settled around 1868. Later used as a northwoods resort.

== See also ==
- List of National Historic Landmarks in Wisconsin
- National Register of Historic Places listings in Wisconsin
- Listings in neighboring counties: Ashland, Gogebic (MI), Price, Vilas
