= Montreal River (Wisconsin–Michigan) =

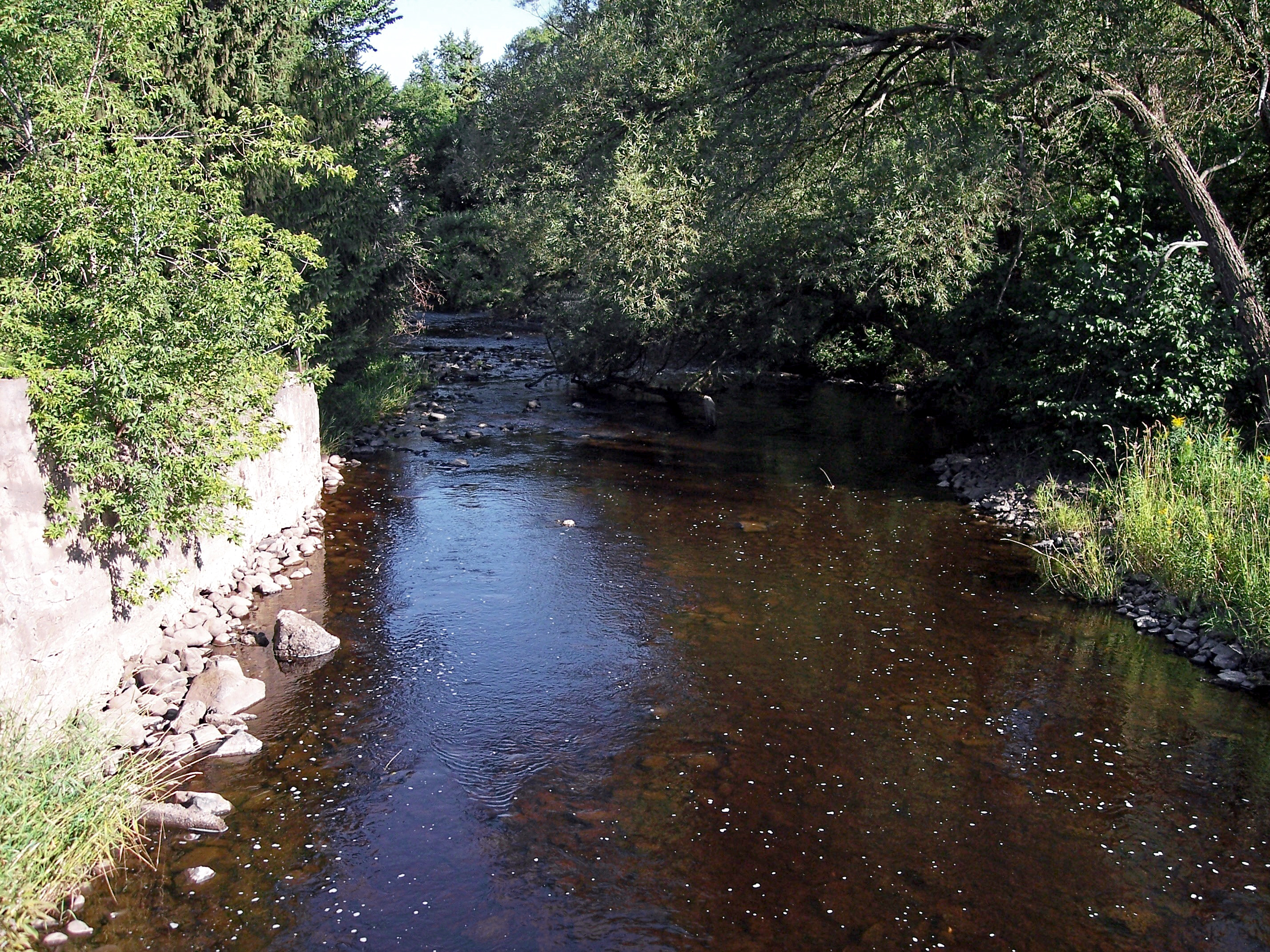
- The Montreal River in Ironwood-Hurley in 2006. Wisconsin is at left; Michigan is at right.

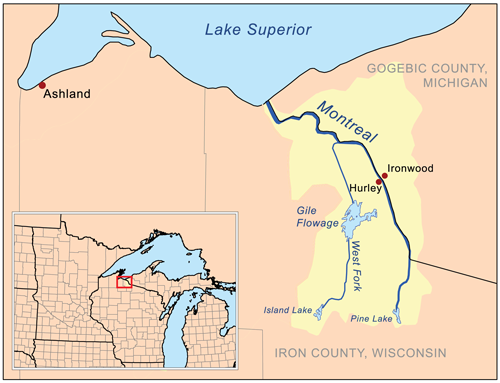

Location
- Country: United States
- State: Michigan, Wisconsin

Physical characteristics
- Source: Pine Lake
  - location: Oma, Wisconsin
  - coordinates: 46°16′11″N 90°08′51″W
  - elevation: 1,611 ft (491 m)
- Mouth: Lake Superior
  - location: Oronto Bay
  - coordinates: 46°33′56″N 90°25′00″W
  - elevation: 610 ft (190 m)
- Length: 47.8 mi (76.9 km)
- Basin size: 270 sq mi (700 km^{2})approx.
- Discharge
  - location: Saxon, Wisconsin(2006)
  - average: 295.2 cu ft/s (8.36 m^{3}/s)(2006)

Basin features
- Tributaries
  - left: West Fork Montreal River

The Montreal River (/ˌmɒntʃriˈɔːl/ mahn-tree-AWL) is a river flowing to Lake Superior in northern Wisconsin and the Upper Peninsula of Michigan in the United States. It is 47.8 miles (76.9 km) long and drains approximately 270 square miles (700 km^{2}) in a forested region. For most of its length, the river's course defines a portion of the Wisconsin–Michigan border. The Ojibwe name for the river is Gaa-waasijiwaang, meaning "where there is whitewater".

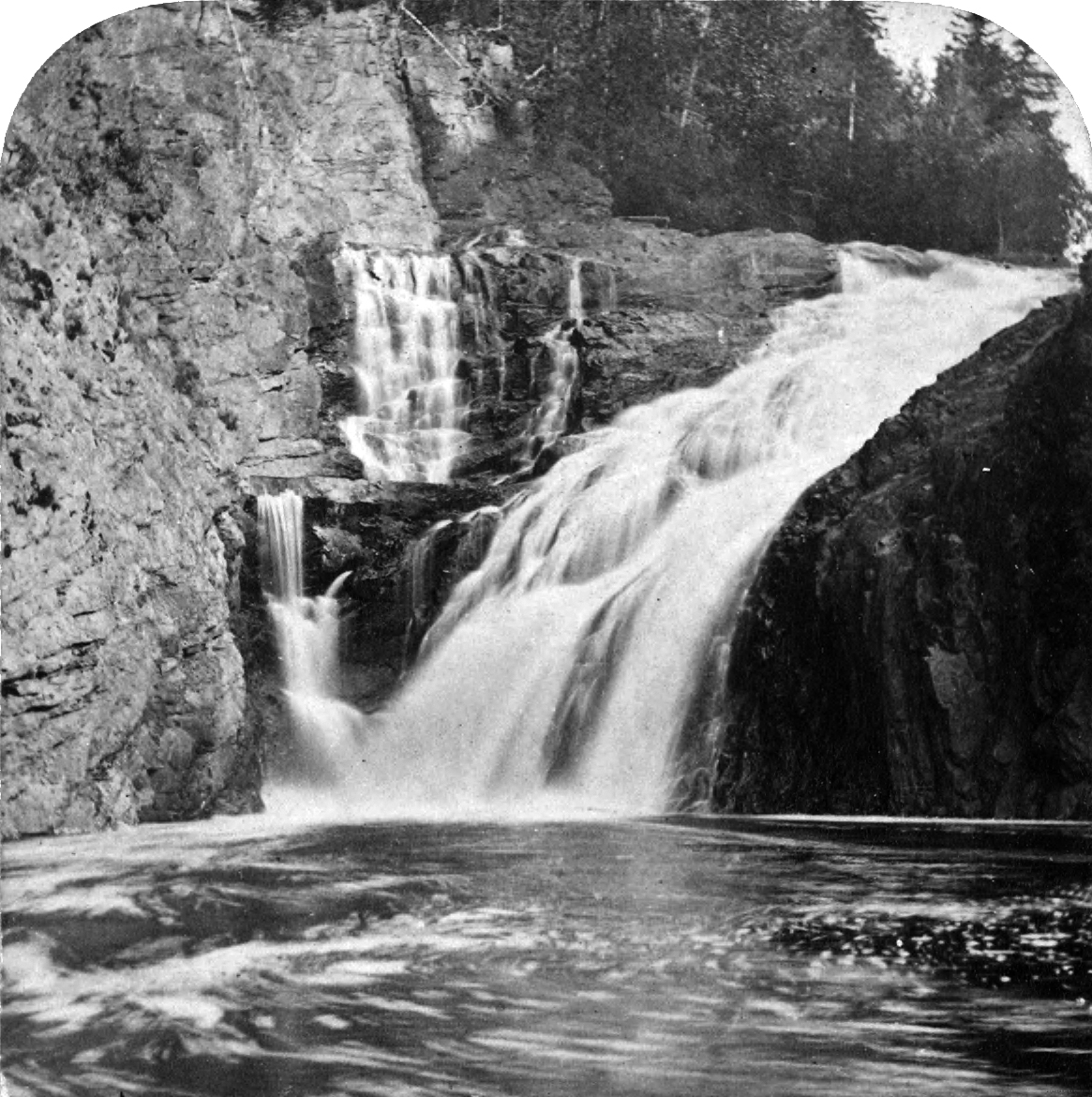
View on the Montreal River, 1870s

The Montreal River issues from Pine Lake in the town of Oma in eastern Iron County in northern Wisconsin. It flows initially northwardly to the boundary between Iron County and Gogebic County, Michigan, then northwestwardly along the state line, past the 'twin cities' of Hurley, Wisconsin, and Ironwood, Michigan. Downstream of Ironwood and Hurley the Montreal River passes over four named waterfalls. Starting below U.S. Route 2 and going downstream (north), they are Peterson, Interstate, Saxon, and Superior Falls; the last two located just upstream of the river's mouth at Lake Superior. The river enters Oronto Bay on the southwestern shore of Lake Superior approximately 15 miles (24 km) northwest of Ironwood, at Michigan's westernmost point.

The West Fork Montreal River issues from Island Lake in central Iron County and flows 24.7 miles (39.8 km) generally northwardly, roughly in parallel to the Montreal River, past the city of Montreal, Wisconsin. It flows into the Montreal River downstream of Hurley. There are four named waterfalls on the West Fork Montreal River: Kimball Falls, Rock Cut Falls, Gile Falls, and Spring Camp Falls.

Both forks of the Montreal River flow through the Gogebic Range, a range of hills near Hurley and Ironwood. The rivers are located in the Laurentian Mixed Forest Province (north woods) region of the upper midwest.

== See also ==
- List of Michigan rivers
- List of Wisconsin rivers
- River borders of U.S. states
