= Annala =

Annala may refer to:

- Annala (surname), Finnish surname
- Annala (district), in Tampere, Finland
- Annala (village), a district in Kauhava, Finland
- Annala Round Barn, in Hurley, Wisconsin, US
- Anala, alternate name of the Hindu fire got Agni
