= Oronto Bay =

- Location within Michigan
- Location: Iron County, Michigan
- Coordinates: 46°34′09″N 090°26′10″W
- Type: Bay
- Surface elevation: 600 feet (180 m)

Oronto Bay is an arm of Lake Superior between Marble Point in Iron County, Wisconsin and Little Girls Point in Gogebic County, Michigan and includes part of the Bad River Reservation. The Montreal River, which forms the border between the two states, empties into the bay after roaring over Superior Falls. To the west of the Montreal, Saxon Harbor is a harbor of refuge adjacent to Oronto Creek in Wisconsin.
