= Anderson, Wisconsin =

Anderson is the name of some places in the U.S. state of Wisconsin:

- Anderson, Burnett County, Wisconsin, a town
- Anderson, Iron County, Wisconsin, a town
- Anderson, Rock County, Wisconsin, an unincorporated community
