= Saxon Harbor =

Harbor in Iron County, Wisconsin

Coordinates: 46°33′46″N 90°26′04″W

Saxon Harbor is located on Lake Superior's Oronto Bay in Iron County, Wisconsin, United States. The harbor, adjacent to Oronto Creek, is a part of a county park that includes deep sea fishing, camping and a sandy beach stretching for four miles westward. Historically, this was near the beginning of an ancient Native American trade route known as the Flambeau Trail and was the site of a fur trading post operated by John Jacob Astor's American Fur Company from 1808 to 1830.

In 2006, a $2.17 million expansion to the harbor was completed. Primarily funded by a Section 154 grant set up by U.S. Representative Dave Obey, the project added a new harbor basin, shoreline protection, new docks and restroom facilities and American Disability Act-complaint sidewalks.

On the night of July 11, 2016, a major storm destroyed the harbor. Oronto Creek spilled over its banks, washing down trees and brush; its water flowed into the harbor, washing away boats, vehicles, asphalt, concrete, and trailers at the campground. One fatality occurred at the harbor. It has since been rebuilt.
