= Superior Falls =

Coordinates: 46°33′45″N 90°24′57″W

Superior Falls near the Wisconsin-Michigan border

Superior Falls is a waterfall situated on the Montreal River, which forms the border between Iron County, Wisconsin and Gogebic County, Michigan, United States. The falls drop 90 feet (27 m) before the Montreal River empties into Lake Superior at Oronto Bay.

In the spring of 2006, extreme kayak competitor, Tao Berman launched himself out of a helicopter and kayaked over the chaotic currents. His efforts were showcased on an August episode of the Discovery Channel's series, Stunt Junkies: Go Big or Go Home, entitled "Kayak Plunge".

== See also ==
- List of waterfalls
