= Hoyt, Wisconsin =

- Ghost town
- Location within Wisconsin Location within the United States
- Coordinates: 46°24′38″N 90°17′59″W
- Country: United States
- State: Wisconsin
- County: Iron
- Town: Knight
- Elevation: 1,575 ft (480 m)
- Time zone: UTC-6 (Central (CST))
  - Summer (DST): UTC-5 (CDT)
- Area codes: 715 & 534
- GNIS feature ID: 1577649

Hoyt is an unpopulated spot located in the town of Knight, Iron County, Wisconsin, United States. Hoyt is 3 miles (4.8 km) west-southwest of Montreal, along Valley Rd north of WIS 77. The community was named for a banker from New York, Colgate Hoyt, who was a trustee of the Wisconsin Central railroad in the 1880s.
