= Van Buskirk, Wisconsin =

- Unincorporated community
- Location within Wisconsin Location within the United States
- Coordinates: 46°23′14″N 90°08′37″W
- Country: United States
- State: Wisconsin
- County: Iron
- Town: Oma
- Elevation: 1,519 ft (463 m)
- Time zone: UTC-6 (Central (CST))
  - Summer (DST): UTC-5 (CDT)
- Area codes: 715 & 534
- GNIS feature ID: 1576032

Van Buskirk is an unincorporated community located in the town of Oma, Iron County, Wisconsin, United States.

== History ==
A post office called Van Buskirk was established in 1890, and remained in operation until it was closed in 1933. The community was named for brothers George and Charles Van Buskirk. The two co-owned the town's sawmill, which operated from 1889 to 1893.

Railroad service existed through the community, on a line which extended north and west to Ashland, and south to Eland and points beyond. It carried passengers until the foundation of Amtrak in 1973. Freight continued to run on the railroad through Van Buskirk until the early 1980s, when the line was abandoned.
