= Brule, Wisconsin =

Town of Brule, Wisconsin
- Town
- Motto: "Home to the River of Presidents"
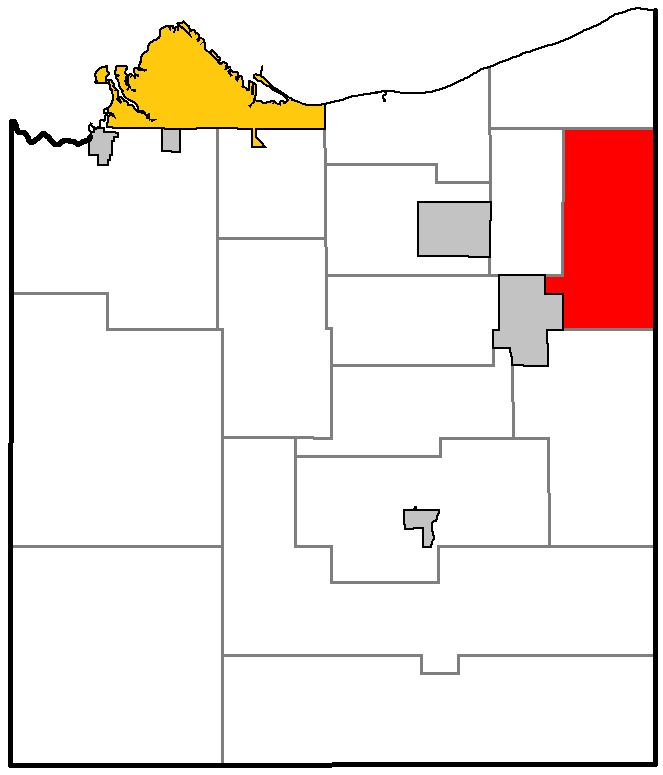
- Location of the Town of Brule, within Douglas County
- Coordinates: 46°33′58″N 91°35′39″W
- Country: United States
- State: Wisconsin
- County: Douglas

Area
  - Total: 55.9 sq mi (144.7 km^{2})
  - Land: 55.7 sq mi (144.3 km^{2})
  - Water: 0.19 sq mi (0.5 km^{2})
- Elevation: 1,093 ft (333 m)

Population (2020)
  - Total: 607
  - Density: 10.9/sq mi (4.21/km^{2})
- Time zone: UTC-6 (Central (CST))
  - Summer (DST): UTC-5 (CDT)
- ZIP code: 54820
- Area codes: 715 and 534
- FIPS code: 55-10575
- GNIS feature ID: 1582879
- Website: Town of Brule Wisconsin

Brule is a town in Douglas County, Wisconsin, United States. The population was 607 at the 2020 census. The town takes its name from the nearby Bois Brule River, which flows north into Lake Superior. The census-designated place of Brule and unincorporated communities of Bellwood, Waino, and Winneboujou are located in the town of Brule.

== History ==
The Town of Brule was founded on November 13, 1886.

The Brule River is one of the preeminent trout streams in North America, with abundant native and migratory steelhead, brown, and brook trout. Located near the primary trout spawning bed for western Lake Superior, Brule is a destination for serious fly fishermen from the around the world.

Four United States presidents, Calvin Coolidge, Herbert Hoover, Harry Truman, and Dwight Eisenhower, have summered near Brule in some of the many Adirondack-style lodges erected by prominent families from Minneapolis and Milwaukee.

In 1899, Professor Ulysses Sherman Grant, of Northwestern University, inspected the Brule, Wisconsin area for ancient copper deposits. CIA chief of counterintelligence James Jesus Angleton had a home on the river.

== Geography ==
According to the United States Census Bureau, the town has a total area of 55.9 square miles (144.7 km^{2}), of which 55.7 square miles (144.3 km^{2}) is land and 0.2 square mile (0.5 km^{2}) (0.32%) is water.

== Climate ==
According to the Köppen Climate Classification system, Brule has a warm-summer humid continental climate, abbreviated "Dfb" on climate maps. The hottest temperature recorded in Brule was 105 °F (40.6 °C) on July 11 and July 13, 1936, while the coldest temperature recorded was −43 °F (−41.7 °C) on February 21, 1939.

Climate data for Brule, Wisconsin, 1991–2020 normals, extremes 1928–present
Month	Jan	Feb	Mar	Apr	May	Jun	Jul	Aug	Sep	Oct	Nov	Dec	Year
Record high °F (°C)	52 (11)	56 (13)	80 (27)	86 (30)	97 (36)	101 (38)	105 (41)	99 (37)	98 (37)	83 (28)	76 (24)	56 (13)	105 (41)
Mean maximum °F (°C)	40.3 (4.6)	45.3 (7.4)	61.1 (16.2)	75.8 (24.3)	85.8 (29.9)	88.3 (31.3)	90.5 (32.5)	87.7 (30.9)	84.2 (29.0)	74.5 (23.6)	60.3 (15.7)	42.8 (6.0)	92.4 (33.6)
Mean daily maximum °F (°C)	20.2 (−6.6)	25.7 (−3.5)	37.3 (2.9)	50.2 (10.1)	64.3 (17.9)	73.3 (22.9)	77.6 (25.3)	75.2 (24.0)	66.7 (19.3)	52.9 (11.6)	37.7 (3.2)	25.2 (−3.8)	50.5 (10.3)
Daily mean °F (°C)	11.0 (−11.7)	15.5 (−9.2)	27.5 (−2.5)	39.6 (4.2)	52.1 (11.2)	61.5 (16.4)	66.5 (19.2)	64.6 (18.1)	56.5 (13.6)	43.9 (6.6)	30.6 (−0.8)	17.7 (−7.9)	40.6 (4.8)
Mean daily minimum °F (°C)	1.8 (−16.8)	5.3 (−14.8)	17.6 (−8.0)	29.0 (−1.7)	39.9 (4.4)	49.7 (9.8)	55.4 (13.0)	53.9 (12.2)	46.3 (7.9)	34.9 (1.6)	23.4 (−4.8)	10.2 (−12.1)	30.6 (−0.8)
Mean minimum °F (°C)	−23.6 (−30.9)	−19.7 (−28.7)	−11.0 (−23.9)	13.7 (−10.2)	25.1 (−3.8)	34.2 (1.2)	42.8 (6.0)	39.8 (4.3)	28.9 (−1.7)	20.1 (−6.6)	3.0 (−16.1)	−16.2 (−26.8)	−27.2 (−32.9)
Record low °F (°C)	−39 (−39)	−43 (−42)	−33 (−36)	−1 (−18)	17 (−8)	21 (−6)	30 (−1)	28 (−2)	17 (−8)	3 (−16)	−11 (−24)	−41 (−41)	−43 (−42)
Average precipitation inches (mm)	1.06 (27)	1.04 (26)	1.63 (41)	2.75 (70)	3.66 (93)	4.11 (104)	4.38 (111)	4.47 (114)	3.57 (91)	3.28 (83)	2.05 (52)	1.44 (37)	33.44 (849)
Average snowfall inches (cm)	16.1 (41)	13.3 (34)	9.5 (24)	6.7 (17)	1.0 (2.5)	0.0 (0.0)	0.0 (0.0)	0.0 (0.0)	0.0 (0.0)	1.1 (2.8)	12.7 (32)	16.9 (43)	77.3 (196.3)
Average precipitation days (≥ 0.01 in)	7.6	6.1	6.1	8.1	9.9	9.1	9.8	8.6	10.5	10.5	7.1	8.2	101.6
Average snowy days (≥ 0.1 in)	8.2	5.8	3.5	1.9	0.3	0.0	0.0	0.0	0.0	0.7	4.2	6.8	31.4
Source 1: NOAA
Source 2: National Weather Service

== Demographics ==
As of the census of 2000, there were 591 people, 244 households, and 165 families residing in the town. The population density was 10.6 people per square mile (4.1/km^{2}). There were 270 housing units at an average density of 4.8 per square mile (1.9/km^{2}). The racial makeup of the town was 98.14% White, 1.18% Native American, and 0.68% from two or more races. Hispanic or Latino of any race were 1.02% of the population.

There were 244 households, out of which 30.3% had children under the age of 18 living with them, 56.1% were married couples living together, 7.4% had a female householder with no husband present, and 32.0% were non-families. 28.7% of all households were made up of individuals, and 12.7% had someone living alone who was 65 years of age or older. The average household size was 2.42 and the average family size was 2.97.

In the town, the population was spread out, with 27.1% under the age of 18, 4.1% from 18 to 24, 28.1% from 25 to 44, 26.4% from 45 to 64, and 14.4% who were 65 years of age or older. The median age was 39 years. For every 100 females, there were 105.2 males. For every 100 females age 18 and over, there were 105.2 males.

The median income for a household in the town was $35,972, and the median income for a family was $40,078. Males had a median income of $32,250 versus $20,000 for females. The per capita income for the town was $14,620. About 8.1% of families and 12.4% of the population were below the poverty line, including 20.7% of those under age 18 and none of those age 65 or over.

== Education ==
Brule Public Schools belong to the Maple School District. There are two elementary schools, a middle school and a high school in the district. Students attend Northwestern High School.

== Infrastructure ==
=== Transportation ===
Main routes in the town of Brule include U.S. Highway 2 and Wisconsin Highway 27, and County Roads B, FF, H, and O.

The town is located between Superior and Ashland along U.S. Highway 2.

== Notable people ==
- Dean Nyquist, Minnesota state senator and lawyer, was born in Brule
