= Saxon (CDP), Wisconsin =

Census-designated place in Wisconsin, United States

Saxon, Wisconsin
- Census-designated place
- Location in Iron County and the state of Wisconsin.
- Coordinates: 46°29′36″N 90°24′52″W
- Country: United States
- State: Wisconsin
- County: Iron
- Town: Saxon

Area
  - Total: 1.215 sq mi (3.15 km^{2})
  - Land: 1.215 sq mi (3.15 km^{2})
  - Water: 0 sq mi (0 km^{2})
- Elevation: 1,119 ft (341 m)

Population (2010)
  - Total: 90
  - Density: 74/sq mi (29/km^{2})
- Time zone: UTC-6 (Central (CST))
  - Summer (DST): UTC-5 (CDT)
- ZIP Code: 54559
- Area codes: 715 & 534
- GNIS feature ID: 1573758

Saxon is an unincorporated census-designated place located in the town of Saxon, Iron County, Wisconsin, United States. Saxon is located on Wisconsin Highway 122, 11 miles (18 km) west-northwest of Hurley. Saxon has a post office with ZIP Code 54559. As of the 2010 census, its population is 90.

== History ==
A post office called Saxon has been in operation since 1887. The community was named after the Saxons, the ancient German people. Joseph J. Defer (1866–1929) served as postmaster of Saxon from 1904 to 1914 and as sheriff of Iron County. He owned a general store and sawmill. Defer served in the Wisconsin Assembly in 1919 and 1920.
