= Pence (CDP), Wisconsin =

Census-designated place in Wisconsin, United States

Pence, Wisconsin
- Census-designated place
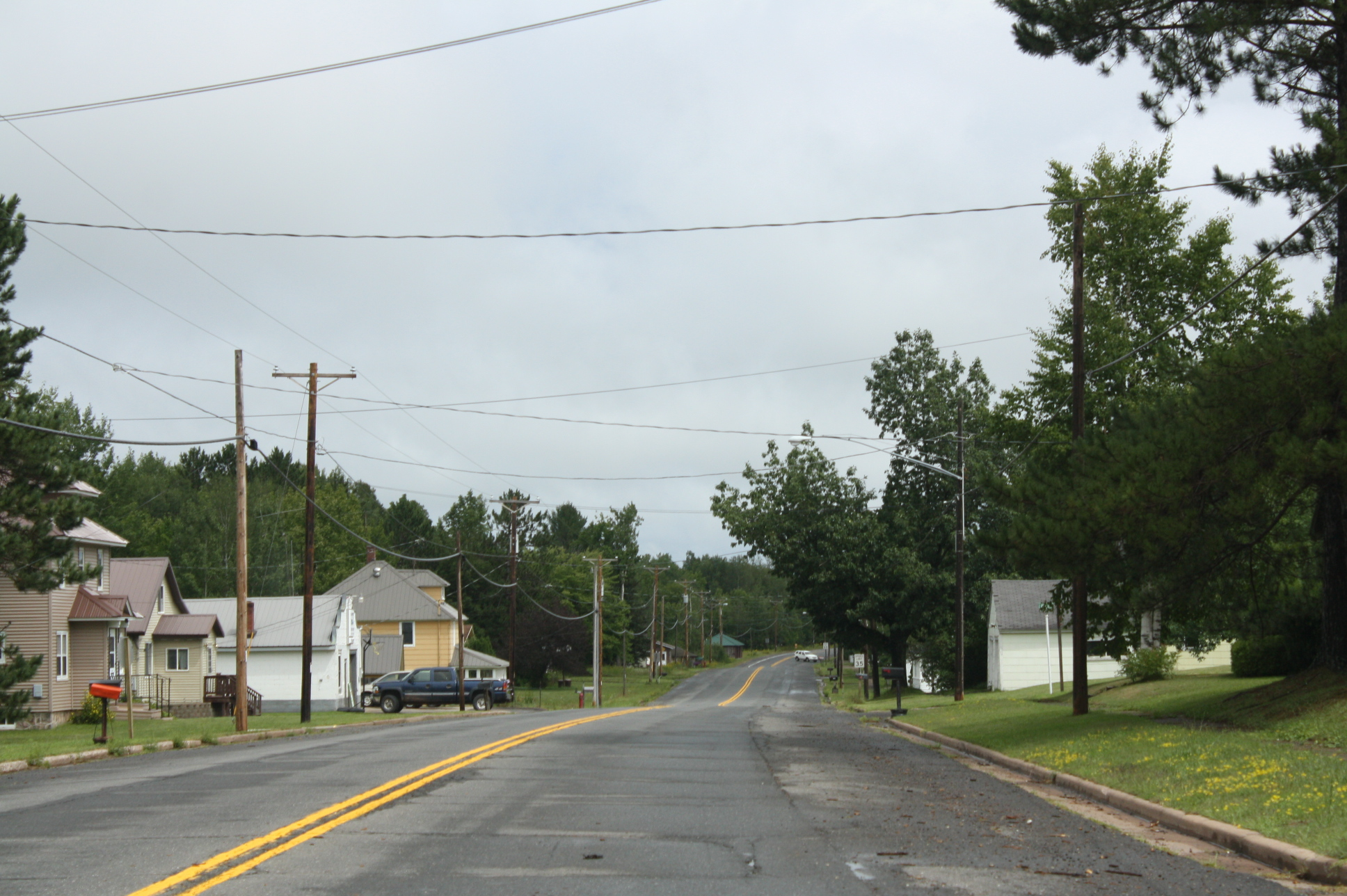
- Looking east in downtown Pence

- Location in Iron County and the state of Wisconsin.
- Coordinates: 46°24′55″N 90°16′18″W
- Country: United States
- State: Wisconsin
- County: Iron
- Town: Pence

Area
  - Total: 1.068 sq mi (2.77 km^{2})
  - Land: 1.068 sq mi (2.77 km^{2})
  - Water: 0 sq mi (0 km^{2})
- Elevation: 1,631 ft (497 m)

Population (2010)
  - Total: 131
  - Density: 123/sq mi (47.4/km^{2})
- Time zone: UTC-6 (Central (CST))
  - Summer (DST): UTC-5 (CDT)
- Area codes: 715 & 534
- GNIS feature ID: 1571168

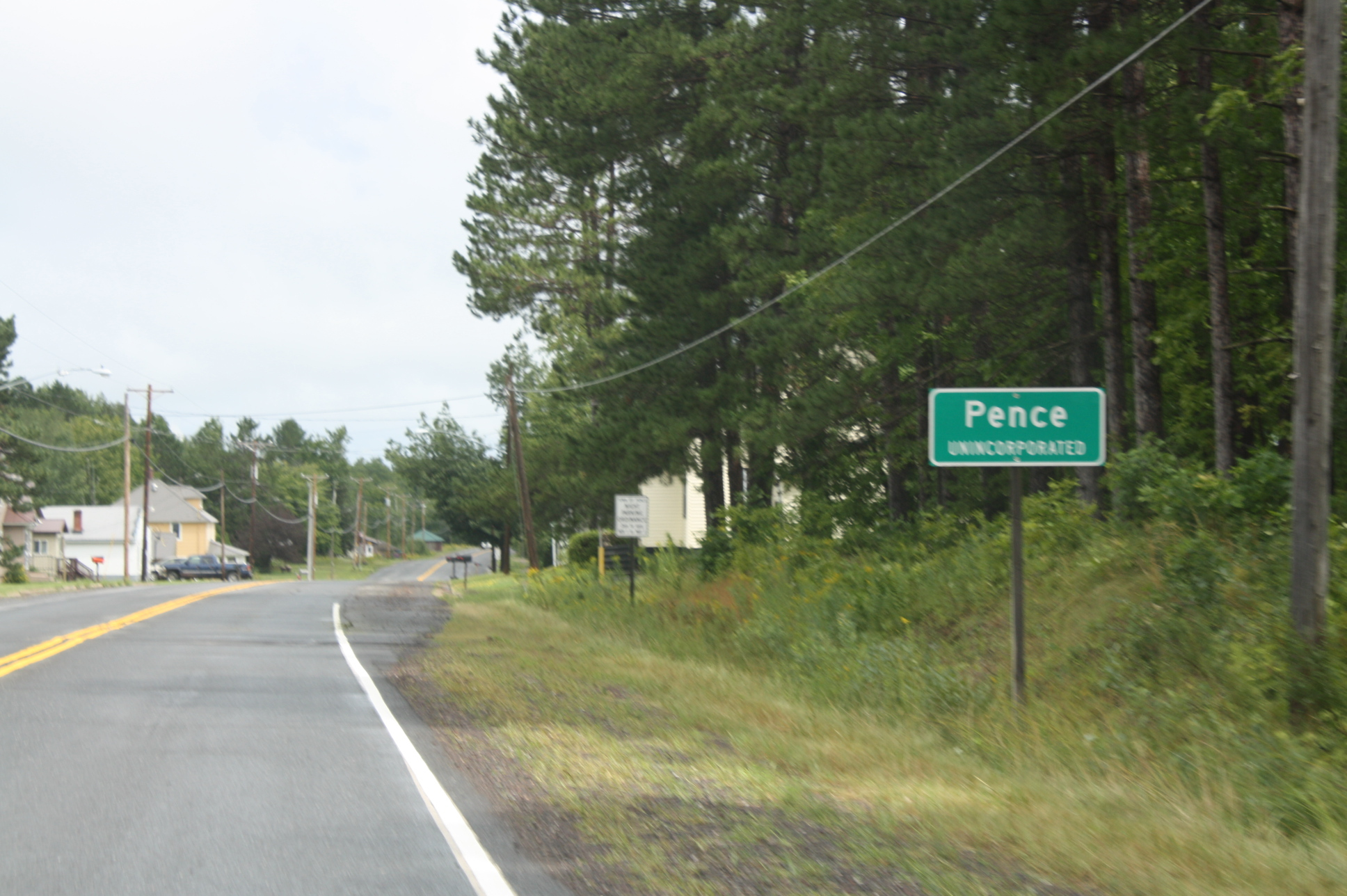
Sign for Pence on WIS77

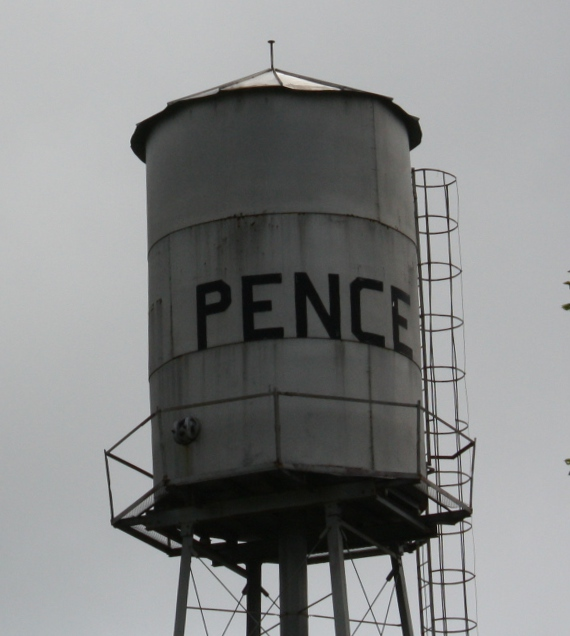
Water tower

Pence is an unincorporated census-designated place in Pence, Iron County, Wisconsin, United States. Pence is located on Wisconsin Highway 77, 1.5 miles (2.4 km) southwest of Montreal. As of the 2010 census, its population is 131.
