= Joseph J. Defer =

American businessman and politician

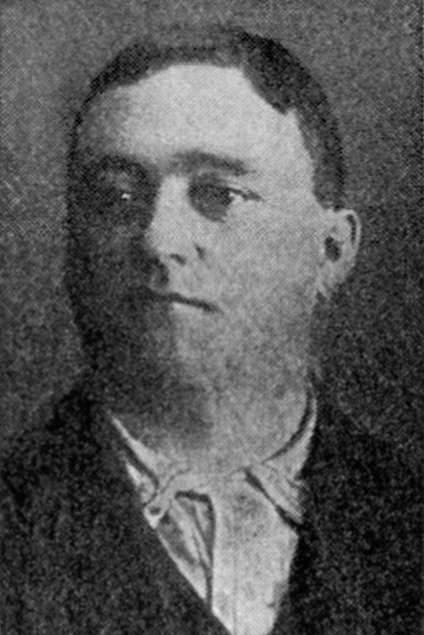

Member of the Wisconsin State Assembly
- In office 1919–1920

Personal details
- Born: October 21, 1866 Detroit, Michigan, US
- Died: April 14, 1929 (aged 62) Saxon, Wisconsin, US
- Party: Republican
- Occupation: Businessman, politician

Joseph John Defer (October 21, 1866 – April 14, 1929) was an American businessman and politician.

== Biography ==
Defer was born in Detroit, Michigan and went to the Detroit public schools. Defer moved to the town of Saxon, Iron County, Wisconsin, in 1886, where he owned a general store and saw mill. Defer served as the postmaster for Saxon. He served on the Iron County Board of Supervisors and was chairman of the county board. From 1905 to 1907, Defer served as sheriff of Iron County and was a Republican. Defer served on the school board and was president of the school board. In 1919 and 1920, Defer served in the Wisconsin Assembly. Defer died at his home in Saxon, Wisconsin from a heart attack.
