= Kimball, Wisconsin =

- Town
- Location in Iron County and the state of Wisconsin.
- Coordinates: 46°28′52″N 90°15′38″W
- Country: United States
- State: Wisconsin
- County: Iron

Area
  - Total: 37.1 sq mi (96.1 km^{2})
  - Land: 37.1 sq mi (96.1 km^{2})
  - Water: 0.039 sq mi (0.1 km^{2})
- Elevation: 1,539 ft (469 m)

Population (2020)
  - Total: 490
  - Density: 13/sq mi (5.1/km^{2})
- Time zone: UTC-6 (Central (CST))
  - Summer (DST): UTC-5 (CDT)
- Area codes: 715 & 534
- FIPS code: 55-39625
- GNIS feature ID: 1583480
- Website: https://kimballwi.gov/

Kimball is a town in Iron County, Wisconsin, United States. The population was 490 at the 2020 census. The unincorporated communities of Kimball and Orva are located in the town.

== History ==
The town was named for Congressman Alanson M. Kimball. Charles R. Clark was the first postmaster when the post office opened in June 1889.

== Geography ==
According to the United States Census Bureau, the town has a total area of 37.1 square miles (96.1 km^{2}), of which 37.1 square miles (96.1 km^{2}) is land and 0.04 square mile (0.1 km^{2}) (0.05%) is water.

== Demographics ==
As of the census of 2000, there were 540 people, 216 households, and 157 families residing in the town. The population density was 14.6 people per square mile (5.6/km^{2}). There were 273 housing units at an average density of 7.4 per square mile (2.8/km^{2}). The racial makeup of the town was 98.33% White, 0.19% African American, 0.19% Native American, 0.19% Asian, and 1.11% from two or more races. Hispanic or Latino of any race were 0.56% of the population.

There were 216 households, out of which 29.6% had children under the age of 18 living with them, 62.0% were married couples living together, 8.3% had a female householder with no husband present, and 26.9% were non-families. 23.6% of all households were made up of individuals, and 11.1% had someone living alone who was 65 years of age or older. The average household size was 2.50 and the average family size was 2.96.

In the town, the population was spread out, with 22.4% under the age of 18, 7.6% from 18 to 24, 23.3% from 25 to 44, 31.1% from 45 to 64, and 15.6% who were 65 years of age or older. The median age was 44 years. For every 100 females, there were 102.2 males. For every 100 females age 18 and over, there were 106.4 males.

The median income for a household in the town was $33,750, and the median income for a family was $42,031. Males had a median income of $37,500 versus $21,563 for females. The per capita income for the town was $19,100. About 5.9% of families and 8.1% of the population were below the poverty line, including 4.3% of those under age 18 and 15.3% of those age 65 or over.
