= Knight, Wisconsin =

- Town
- Location in Iron County and the state of Wisconsin.
- Coordinates: 46°16′29″N 90°20′39″W
- Country: United States
- State: Wisconsin
- County: Iron

Area
  - Total: 95.1 sq mi (246.3 km^{2})
  - Land: 94.1 sq mi (243.7 km^{2})
  - Water: 1.0 sq mi (2.6 km^{2})
- Elevation: 1,762 ft (537 m)

Population (2020)
  - Total: 212
  - Density: 2.25/sq mi (0.870/km^{2})
- Time zone: UTC-6 (Central (CST))
  - Summer (DST): UTC-5 (CDT)
- Area codes: 715 & 534
- FIPS code: 55-40075
- GNIS feature ID: 1583489
- Website: https://townofknightwi.org/

Knight is a town in Iron County, Wisconsin, United States. The population was 212 at the 2020 census. The unincorporated communities of Hoyt and Iron Belt are located in the town.

== Geography ==
According to the United States Census Bureau, the town has a total area of 95.1 square miles (246.3 km^{2}), of which 94.1 square miles (243.7 km^{2}) is land and 1.0 square mile (2.6 km^{2}) (1.05%) is water.

== Demographics ==
As of the census of 2000, there were 284 people, 122 households, and 81 families residing in the town. The population density was 3.0 people per square mile (1.2/km^{2}). There were 235 housing units at an average density of 2.5 per square mile (1.0/km^{2}). The racial makeup of the town was 98.94% White, 0.70% Native American, and 0.35% from two or more races. Hispanic or Latino of any race were 0.35% of the population.

There were 122 households, out of which 23.0% had children under the age of 18 living with them, 48.4% were married couples living together, 11.5% had a female householder with no husband present, and 33.6% were non-families. 29.5% of all households were made up of individuals, and 18.0% had someone living alone who was 65 years of age or older. The average household size was 2.33 and the average family size was 2.86.

In the town, the population was spread out, with 21.5% under the age of 18, 8.1% from 18 to 24, 24.6% from 25 to 44, 26.4% from 45 to 64, and 19.4% who were 65 years of age or older. The median age was 43 years. For every 100 females, there were 100.0 males. For every 100 females age 18 and over, there were 97.3 males.

The median income for a household in the town was $32,969, and the median income for a family was $37,857. Males had a median income of $22,292 versus $26,875 for females. The per capita income for the town was $15,278. About 2.6% of families and 7.3% of the population were below the poverty line, including 10.4% of those under the age of eighteen and 7.1% of those 65 or over.
