= Wisconsin Highway 77 =

State highway in Wisconsin, United States

State Trunk Highway 77
- WIS 77 highlighted in red

Route information
- Maintained by WisDOT
- Length: 139.94 mi (225.21 km)

Major junctions
- West end: MN 48 in Danbury
- WIS 35 in Danbury; US 53 in Minong; US 63 / WIS 27 in Hayward; WIS 13 in Mellen; WIS 122 in Upson
- East end: US 51 in Hurley

Location
- Country: United States
- State: Wisconsin
- Counties: Burnett, Washburn, Sawyer, Ashland, Iron

Highway system
- Wisconsin State Trunk Highway System; Interstate; US; State; Scenic; Rustic
← WIS 76	→ WIS 78

State Trunk Highway 77 (often called Highway 77, STH-77 or WIS 77) is a state highway in the U.S. state of Wisconsin. It runs east–west in northwest Wisconsin from the Minnesota border near Danbury to just west of the Michigan border in Hurley. The highway was first designated in 1920 and was extended to the current routing sometime between 1948 and 1956.

== Route description ==
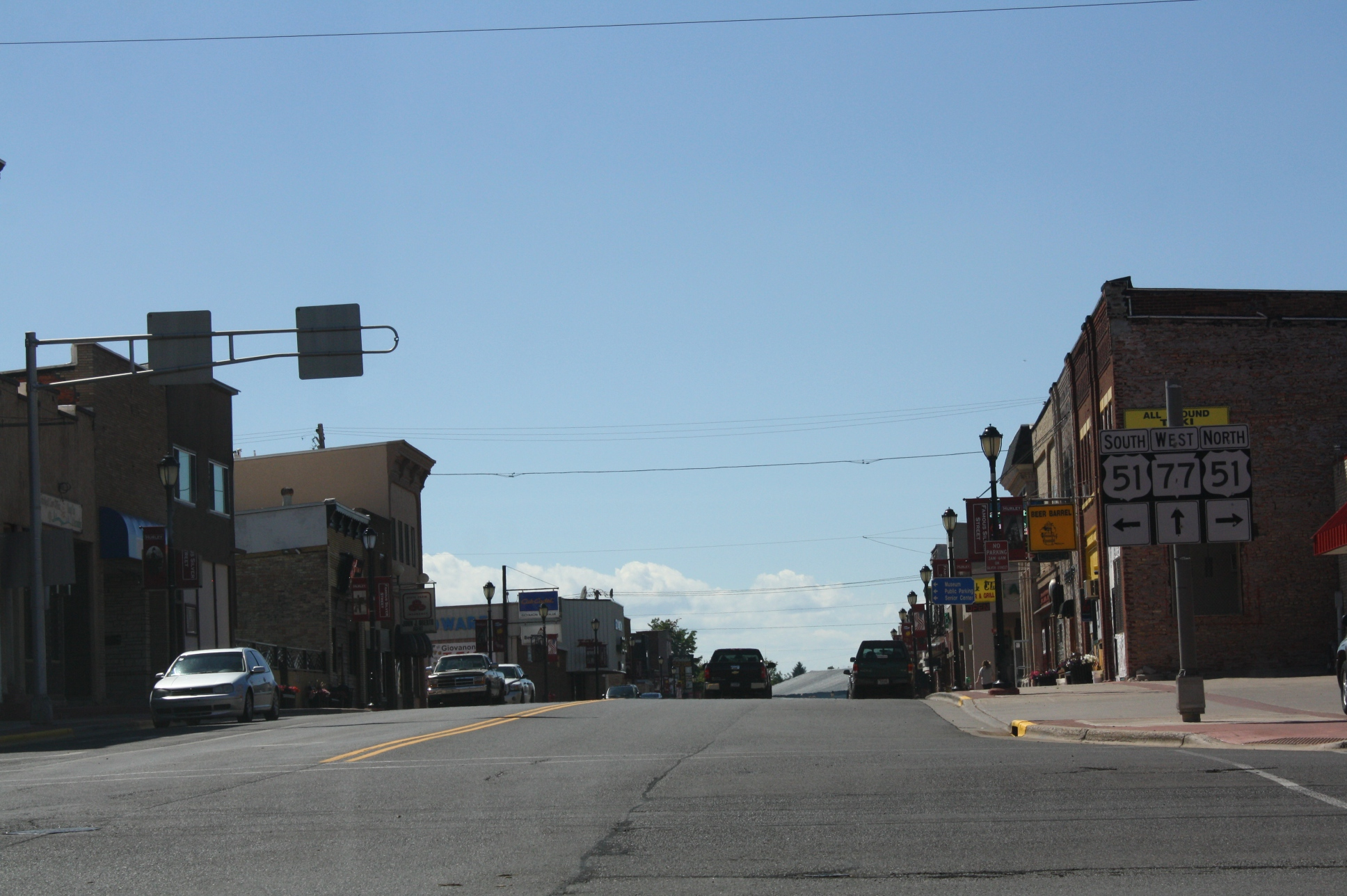
Eastern terminus in Hurley

The highway begins at the Minnesota state line along the St. Croix River as a continuation of MIN 48 and runs east from it. The highway passes by County Trunk Highway (CTH) F in Danbury and begins a concurrency with WIS 35 in the east of Danbury. The concurrency runs northeastward along the St. Croix River until the highway leaves the concurrency and runs eastward from it. The highway passes by a large amount of lakes and then curves to the north, meeting US 53 and its business route in Minong. It then runs east from it, intersecting with CTH-G. Between CTH-G and CTH-M, the highway runs southeast and crosses a railroad. The highway then runs eastward towards a concurrency with WIS 27.

After its concurrency with WIS 27 starts, the highway meets Smith Lake and curves to the south, running towards Hayward. After entering Hayward, it meets US 63 and WIS 27 follows it, ending its concurrency with the highway. After intersecting with US 63, the highway runs north of Hayward Lake. East of Hayward, the highway runs northeastward. It passes to the northwest of Round Lake and runs around the west and north of McClaine Lake, and then runs east from it. The highway then enters the Chequamegon-Nicolet National Forest and passes by more lakes in the National Forest, running northeastward to Clam Lake. In the national forest, WIS 77 is designated as the Great Divide Highway. From there, the highway runs east.

Soon after the highway exits the National Forest, it begins a concurrency with WIS 13 and runs northward towards Mellen, and runs through another section of the National Forest. The highway enters Mellen along Main Street and exits the concurrency, running along Lake Drive before running east from Lake Drive just north of Tannery Town. The highway then runs east-northeast, passing through Upson (where it meets WIS 122), Iron Belt, Pence, and Montreal. The highway continues east into Hurley and terminates at US 51 west of the Michigan state line along the Montreal River.

== History ==
The highway was first designated between Mellen to Hurley in northeast Wisconsin. In 1922, a highway linking Minong and Hayward, to be designated WIS 124, was constructed, and it was open by 1923. In 1924, the highway was extended west to Hayward and the section west of WIS 35 was designated was WIS 152. Sometime between 1948 and 1956, the highway was extended west to the Minnesota state line. The former WIS 124 (by then WIS 27) and WIS 152 were redesignated as parts of the highway. In 1956, the only section that was not part of a concurrency that was paved was near the eastern terminus in Hurley.

== Major intersections ==
County	Location	mi	km	Destinations	Notes
Burnett	Swiss	0.0	0.0	MN 48 west – Hinckley	Minnesota state line
Burnett	Swiss	4.0	6.4	WIS 35 south – Webster, Siren	Southern end of WIS 35 concurrency
Burnett	Swiss	6.2	10.0	WIS 35 north – Superior	Northern end of WIS 35 concurrency
Washburn	Minong	33.1	53.3	US 53 – Superior, Eau Claire	
Washburn	Minong	33.6	54.1	Bus. US 53	
Sawyer	Lenroot	50.5	81.3	WIS 27 north – Brule	Northern end of WIS 27 concurrency
Sawyer	Hayward	54.1	87.1	US 63 / WIS 27 south – Ashland, Spooner	Southern end of WIS 27 concurrency
Ashland	Morse	100.5	161.7	WIS 13 south – Glidden	Southern end of WIS 13 concurrency
Ashland	Mellen	113.6	182.8	WIS 13 north – Ashland	Northern end of WIS 13 concurrency
Iron	Anderson	126.9	204.2	WIS 122 north – Saxon	
Iron	Hurley	139.5	224.5	US 51 – Ashland, Woodruff	
1.000 mi = 1.609 km; 1.000 km = 0.621 mi: Concurrency terminus
