= Kimball (community), Wisconsin =

Kimball, Wisconsin
- Unincorporated community
- Location within Wisconsin Location within the United States
- Coordinates: 46°28′55″N 90°18′22″W
- Country: United States
- State: Wisconsin
- County: Iron
- Town: Kimball
- Elevation: 1,260 ft (380 m)
- Time zone: UTC-6 (Central (CST))
  - Summer (DST): UTC-5 (CDT)
- Area codes: 715 & 534
- GNIS feature ID: 1577677

Kimball is an unincorporated community located in the town of Kimball, Iron County, Wisconsin, United States.

Kimball is located 6 miles (9.7 km) to the west-northwest of Hurley.

== History ==
A post office called Kimball was established in 1889, and remained in operation until it was discontinued in 1942. The community was named for Alanson M. Kimball, member of the U.S. House of Representatives from Wisconsin's 6th district.
