= List of river borders of U.S. states =

Because of its unique history, many of the boundaries of the political divisions of the United States were artificially constructed (rather than permitted to evolve and drawn using natural features of the landscape). Therefore, many U.S. states have straight lines as boundaries, especially in the West. However, there are many partial state boundaries, particularly in the Midwest, Northeast, and South, that are defined by rivers; in fact, only four mainland states (Colorado, Montana, Utah, and Wyoming) completely lack any borders defined by rivers or waterways, as well as Hawaii (whose borders are the islands) and Alaska.

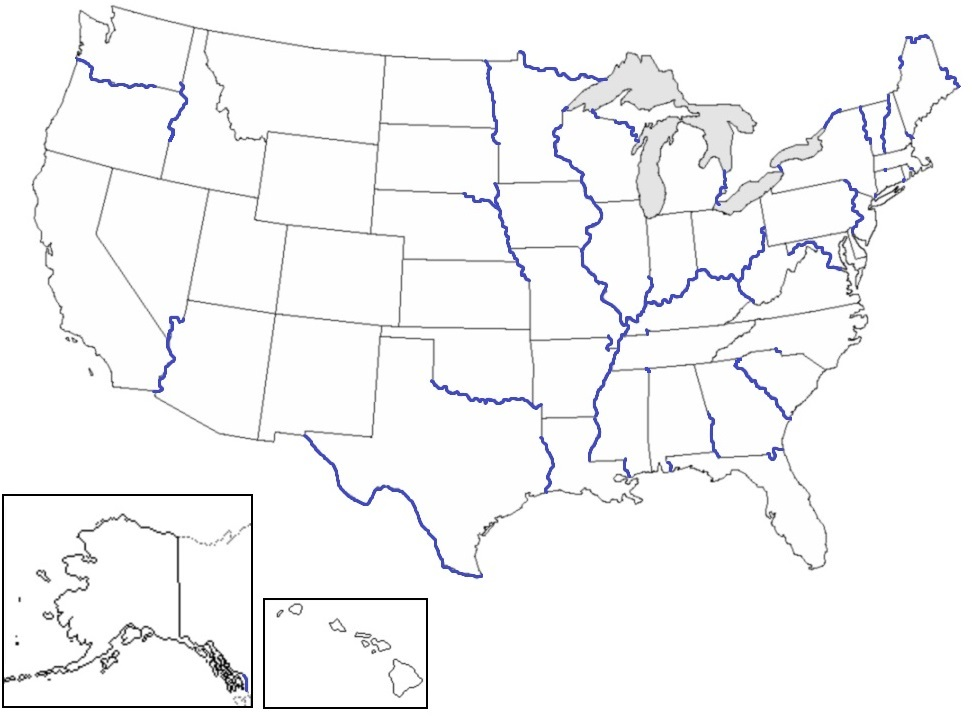
Map of U.S. river/waterway state borders (highlighted)

== The rule of the thread of the channel and its exceptions ==
River boundaries are typically defined by the "thread of the channel" (the river's thalweg, usually in the approximate middle of the river's channel), under a rule that the United States inherited from England, where it applies to boundaries between counties. In the United States, there are at least six exceptions, however, where the boundary is one bank of the river rather than the thread of the channel:

- The boundary between New Hampshire and Vermont is the west bank of the Connecticut River. This was established as the eastern boundary of New York by a grant of King Charles II in 1664. It was disregarded by Governor Benning Wentworth of New Hampshire, who treated the New Hampshire Grants west of the river as a de facto part of New Hampshire during the years 1649–1764, but King George III put an end to that in 1764. In August 1781, the Continental Congress decided it would recognize the then largely unrecognized state of Vermont, which had been organized in defiance of New York, on condition that Vermont would agree to certain boundaries. In 1782, the legislature of Vermont agreed, but nonetheless Vermont was not admitted to the Union until 1791. In 1933, citing the 1782 legislation, the United States Supreme Court denied the petition from the state of Vermont to make the boundary the thread of the channel.
- The boundaries between Kentucky and West Virginia and the three states to their north – Ohio, Indiana, and Illinois – is based on the historical northern bank of the Ohio River. In 1763, Britain defeated France in the Seven Years' War, whose North American theater was called the French and Indian War. At that time, Canada, which had been a French colony, became a British colony, and Parliament made the north bank of the Ohio the southern boundary of Canada. The river was thus included in the district of Kentucky, which was then a part of Virginia. In January 1980, the U.S. Supreme Court ruled in Ohio v. Kentucky that the state line is the low-water mark of the Ohio River's north shore as of Kentucky's admission to the Union in 1792. Because both damming and natural changes have rendered the 1792 shore virtually undetectable in many places, the exact boundary was decided in the 1990s in settlements among the states.
- The boundary between Delaware and New Jersey north of 39° 30' north latitude is the east bank of the Delaware River.
- The boundary between Delaware and New Jersey south of a certain point is the east bank of the Delaware River, rather than the thread of the channel.
- The boundary between Maryland and Virginia is the south bank of the Potomac River. This also applies both to the border between Maryland and West Virginia (from Harper's Ferry to the source of the Potomac near the Fairfax Stone) since the latter was at one point part of Virginia, and to the border between Virginia and Washington, D.C., since the capital was established from a section of Maryland property.
- The boundary between Alabama and Georgia, south of West Point, Georgia, is the west bank of the Chattahoochee River at the mean water mark. This was established in an 1860 Supreme Court ruling, Alabama v. Georgia.
- The course of the Charles River was used to indirectly define the border between Massachusetts and Rhode Island. The Merrimack River defines part of the border between Massachusetts and New Hampshire, which runs parallel to the river, three miles north of it (see Northern boundary of Massachusetts.)

== List of river borders ==
Rivers and lakes in the United States

Bolded states indicate international boundaries:

River	Bordering states
Arthur Kill	New Jersey, New York (tidal strait)
Arkansas River	Colorado, Kansas, Oklahoma, Arkansas
Big Sandy River	Kentucky, West Virginia
Big Sioux River	South Dakota, Iowa
Blackwater River	Virginia, North Carolina
Bois de Sioux River	South Dakota, Minnesota, North Dakota
Brule River	Michigan, Wisconsin
Byram River	Connecticut, New York
Catawba River	North Carolina, South Carolina
Chattahoochee River	Alabama, Florida, Georgia
Chattooga River	Georgia, South Carolina
Colorado River	Arizona, Nevada, California, **Baja California**
Columbia River	Washington, Oregon
Connecticut River	New Hampshire, Vermont
Delaware River	New York, Pennsylvania, New Jersey, Delaware
Des Moines River	Iowa, Missouri
Detroit River	Michigan, **Ontario**
Great Miami River	Ohio, Indiana (mouth only)
Halls Stream	New Hampshire, **Quebec**
Hudson River	New Jersey, New York
Menominee River	Michigan, Wisconsin
Mississippi River	Minnesota, Wisconsin, Iowa, Illinois, Missouri, Kentucky, Tennessee, Arkansas, Mississippi, Louisiana
Missouri River	South Dakota, Nebraska, Iowa, Missouri, Kansas
Montreal River	Michigan, Wisconsin
Niagara River	New York, **Ontario**
Ohio River	Illinois, Indiana, Ohio, Pennsylvania, Kentucky, West Virginia
Palmer River	Rhode Island, Massachusetts
Pawcatuck River	Connecticut, Rhode Island
Pearl River	Mississippi, Louisiana
Perdido River	Florida, Alabama
Pigeon River	Minnesota, **Ontario**
Pine River	Minnesota, **Ontario**
Piscataqua River	Maine, New Hampshire
Pocomoke River	Maryland, Virginia
Poteau River	Arkansas, Oklahoma
Potomac River	Maryland, Virginia, Washington, D.C., West Virginia
Poultney River	Vermont, New York
Rainy River	Minnesota, **Ontario**
Red River of the North	North Dakota, Minnesota
Red River of the South	Texas, Oklahoma, Arkansas
Rio Grande	New Mexico, Texas, **Chihuahua**, **Coahuila**, **Nuevo León**, **Tamaulipas**
Runnins River	Rhode Island, Massachusetts
Sabine River	Texas, Louisiana
St. Clair River	Michigan, **Ontario**
St. Croix River	Maine, **New Brunswick**
St. Croix River	Minnesota, Wisconsin
St. Francis River	Arkansas, Missouri
St. Francis River	Maine, **Quebec**
St. John River	Maine, **New Brunswick**
St. Lawrence River	New York, **Ontario**
St. Louis River	Minnesota, Wisconsin
St. Marys River	Florida, Georgia
St. Marys River	Michigan, **Ontario**
Salmon Falls River	New Hampshire, Maine
Savannah River	South Carolina, Georgia
Snake River	Idaho, Washington, Oregon
Tennessee River	Kentucky, Tennessee, Mississippi, Alabama
Tug Fork River	Kentucky, West Virginia, Virginia
Tugaloo River	Georgia, South Carolina
Wabash River	Illinois, Indiana

== List of U.S. states with river borders ==
Nearly every U.S. state border has some portion that is a river or other water way; 44 in total.

- Alabama
- Arizona
- Arkansas
- California
- Connecticut
- D.C.
- Delaware
- Florida
- Georgia
- Idaho
- Illinois
- Indiana
- Iowa
- Kansas
- Kentucky
- Louisiana
- Maine
- Maryland
- Massachusetts
- Michigan
- Minnesota
- Mississippi
- Missouri
- Nebraska
- Nevada
- New Hampshire
- New Jersey
- New Mexico
- New York
- North Carolina
- North Dakota
- Ohio
- Oklahoma
- Oregon
- Pennsylvania
- Rhode Island
- South Carolina
- South Dakota
- Tennessee
- Texas
- Vermont
- Virginia
- Washington
- West Virginia
- Wisconsin
