= Winneboujou, Wisconsin =

- Unincorporated community
- Location within Wisconsin Location within the United States
- Coordinates: 46°31′03″N 91°36′04″W
- Country: United States
- State: Wisconsin
- County: Douglas
- Town: Brule
- Elevation: 1,027 ft (313 m)
- Time zone: UTC-6 (Central (CST))
  - Summer (DST): UTC-5 (CDT)
- Area codes: 715 and 534
- GNIS feature ID: 1577890

Winneboujou is an unincorporated community, located in the town of Brule, Douglas County, Wisconsin, United States.

The community is located three miles east of Lake Nebagamon; and 33 miles east-southeast of the city of Superior.

Winneboujou is located at the junction of Wisconsin Highway 27 and County Road B.

The community is named after Winneboujou, a character from the Ojibwa traditional stories.
