= Oma, Wisconsin =

- Town
- Location in Iron County and the state of Wisconsin
- Coordinates: 46°16′53″N 90°3′14″W
- Country: United States
- State: Wisconsin
- County: Iron

Area
  - Total: 77.8 sq mi (201.4 km^{2})
  - Land: 74.7 sq mi (193.5 km^{2})
  - Water: 3.1 sq mi (7.9 km^{2})
- Elevation: 1,762 ft (537 m)

Population (2020)
  - Total: 320
  - Density: 4.3/sq mi (1.7/km^{2})
- Time zone: UTC−6 (Central (CST))
  - Summer (DST): UTC−5 (CDT)
- Area codes: 715 & 534
- FIPS code: 55-59850
- GNIS feature ID: 1583858

Oma is a town in Iron County, Wisconsin, United States. The population was 320 at the time of the 2020 census. The unincorporated communities of Pine Lake and Van Buskirk are located within the town.

== Geography ==
According to the United States Census Bureau, the town has a total area of 77.8 square miles (201.4 km^{2}), of which 74.7 square miles (193.5 km^{2}) is land and 3.0 square miles (7.8 km^{2}), or 3.9%, is water.

== Demographics ==
As of the census of 2000, there were 355 people, 156 households, and 109 families residing in the town. The population density was 4.8 people per square mile (1.8/km^{2}). There were 542 housing units at an average density of 7.3 per square mile (2.8/km^{2}). The racial makeup of the town was 98.31% White, 0.56% Native American, 0.28% Asian, and 0.85% from two or more races. Hispanic or Latino of any race were 0.56% of the population.

Of the 156 households, 21.2% had children under the age of 18 living with them, 64.7% were married couples living together, 3.2% had a female householder with no husband present, and 29.5% were non-families. Additionally, 24.4% of all households were made up of individuals, and 9.0% had someone living alone who was 65 years of age or older. The average household size was 2.28, and the average family size was 2.72.

The population was spread out, with 20.6% under the age of 18, 2.8% from 18 to 24, 18.9% from 25 to 44, 38.9% from 45 to 64, and 18.9% who were 65 years of age or older. The median age was 49 years. For every 100 females, there were 95.1 males. For every 100 females age 18 and over, there were 105.8 males.

The median income for a household in the town was $30,917, and the median income for a family was $31,923. Males had a median income of $27,188, versus $21,719 for females. The per capita income for the town was $16,146. About 10.6% of families and 16.1% of the population were below the poverty line, including 34.8% of those under age 18 and 17.9% of those age 65 or over.
