= Carey, Wisconsin =

- Town
- Location in Iron County and the state of Wisconsin.
- Coordinates: 46°20′32″N 90°13′35″W
- Country: United States
- State: Wisconsin
- County: Iron

Area
  - Total: 43.0 sq mi (111.4 km^{2})
  - Land: 41.5 sq mi (107.6 km^{2})
  - Water: 1.5 sq mi (3.8 km^{2})
- Elevation: 1,617 ft (493 m)

Population (2020)
  - Total: 172
  - Density: 4.14/sq mi (1.60/km^{2})
- Time zone: UTC-6 (Central (CST))
  - Summer (DST): UTC-5 (CDT)
- Area codes: 715 & 534
- FIPS code: 55-12525
- GNIS feature ID: 1582916

Carey is a town in Iron County, Wisconsin, United States. The population was 172 at the 2020 census.

== Geography ==
According to the United States Census Bureau, the town has a total area of 43.0 square miles (111.4 km^{2}), of which 41.5 square miles (107.6 km^{2}) is land and 1.5 square miles (3.8 km^{2}) (3.42%) is water.

== Demographics ==
As of the census of 2000, there were 191 people, 75 households, and 54 families residing in the town. The population density was 4.6 people per square mile (1.8/km^{2}). There were 176 housing units at an average density of 4.2 per square mile (1.6/km^{2}). The racial makeup of the town was 98.43% White, and 1.57% from two or more races. Hispanic or Latino of any race were 1.05% of the population.

There were 75 households, out of which 36.0% had children under the age of 18 living with them, 64.0% were married couples living together, 6.7% had a female householder with no husband present, and 26.7% were non-families. 25.3% of all households were made up of individuals, and 13.3% had someone living alone who was 65 years of age or older. The average household size was 2.55 and the average family size was 3.09.

In the town, the population was spread out, with 25.7% under the age of 18, 5.2% from 18 to 24, 27.2% from 25 to 44, 19.9% from 45 to 64, and 22.0% who were 65 years of age or older. The median age was 40 years. For every 100 females, there were 112.2 males. For every 100 females age 18 and over, there were 121.9 males.

The median income for a household in the town was $35,625, and the median income for a family was $38,125. Males had a median income of $45,625 versus $48,125 for females. The per capita income for the town was $24,918. About 3.6% of families and 3.6% of the population were below the poverty line, including none of those under the age of eighteen and 3.8% of those 65 or over.
