= Plummer Mine Headframe =

- U.S. National Register of Historic Places
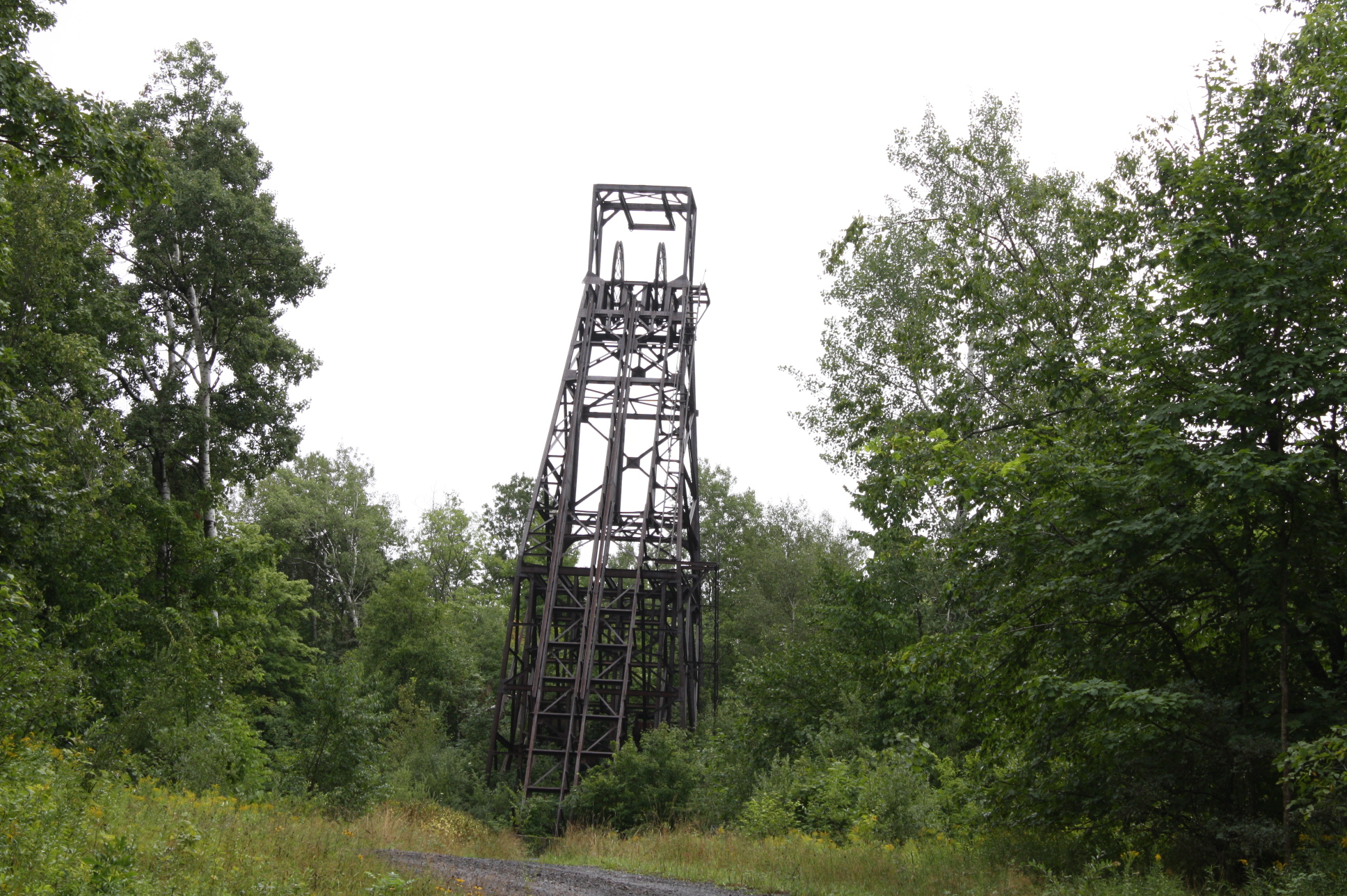
- Plummer Mine Headframe

- Location within Wisconsin Location within the United States
- Location: 0.25 mi. W of jct. of Plummer Mine Rd. and WI 77, Pence, Wisconsin
- Coordinates: 46°24′25″N 90°17′31″W
- Area: 12.6 acres (5.1 ha)
- NRHP reference No.: 97001141
- Added to NRHP: September 24, 1997

The Plummer Mine Headframe is located in Pence, Wisconsin.

== History ==
The headframe was operated from 1904 to 1924. It belonged to an iron mine.
