= Brule (CDP), Wisconsin =

Census-designated place in Wisconsin, United States

Brule, Wisconsin
- Census-designated place
- Location within Wisconsin
- Coordinates: 46°33′11″N 91°34′36″W
- Country: United States
- State: Wisconsin
- County: Douglas
- Town: Brule

Area
  - Total: 2.677 sq mi (6.93 km^{2})
  - Land: 2.677 sq mi (6.93 km^{2})
  - Water: 0 sq mi (0 km^{2})
- Elevation: 988 ft (301 m)

Population (2020)
  - Total: 208
  - Density: 77.7/sq mi (30.0/km^{2})
- Time zone: UTC-6 (Central (CST))
  - Summer (DST): UTC-5 (CDT)
- ZIP code: 54820
- Area codes: 715 and 534
- GNIS feature ID: 1562290

Brule is an unincorporated, census-designated place, located in the town of Brule, Douglas County, Wisconsin, United States. As of the 2020 census, the population was 208, a decline from 254 at the 2010 census.

U.S. Highway 2, Wisconsin Highway 27 and County Road H are the main routes in the community of Brule.

Intercity bus service to the community is provided by Indian Trails.

Brule is located 6.5 miles east-northeast of Lake Nebagamon; 30 miles east of the city of Superior; and 35 miles west of the city of Ashland.

Brule has a post office with ZIP code 54820.
