= Annala (surname) =

Annala is a Finnish and Telugu surname. Notable people with the surname include:

- Valentin Annala (1859–1926), Finnish railway guard, noncommissioned officer and politician
- Vilho Annala (1888–1960), Finnish civil servant, economist and politician
- Marko Annala (born 1972), Finnish heavy metal singer
- Juho Annala (born 1984), Finnish racing driver
