= Iron Belt, Wisconsin =

Census-designated place in Wisconsin, United States

- Census-designated place
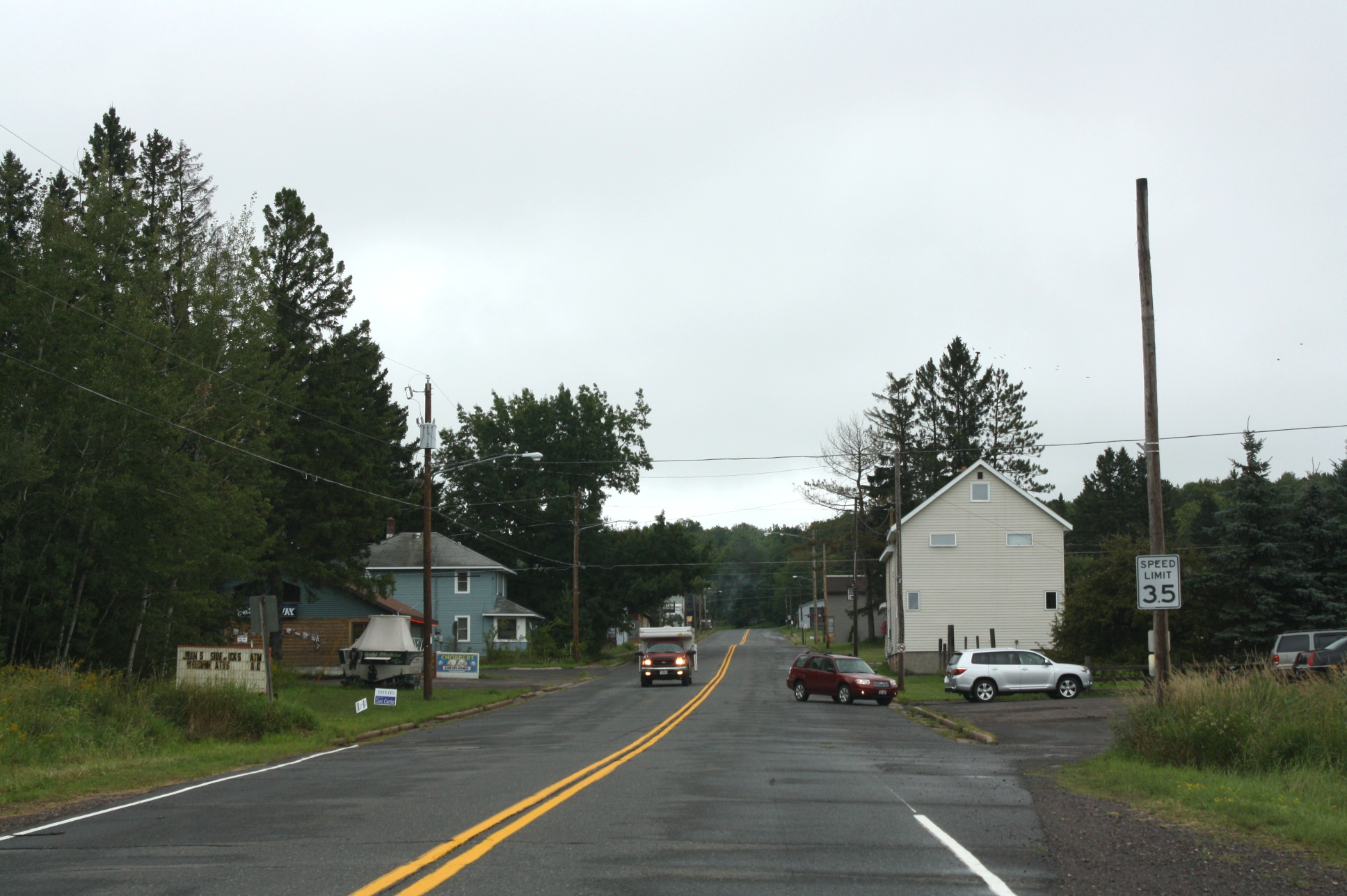
- Looking east at downtown Iron Belt on WIS77

- Location in Iron County and the state of Wisconsin.
- Coordinates: 46°24′02″N 90°19′28″W
- Country: United States
- State: Wisconsin
- County: Iron
- Town: Knight

Area
  - Total: 2.451 sq mi (6.35 km^{2})
  - Land: 2.451 sq mi (6.35 km^{2})
  - Water: 0 sq mi (0 km^{2})
- Elevation: 1,555 ft (474 m)

Population (2020)
  - Total: 158
  - Density: 64.5/sq mi (24.9/km^{2})
- Time zone: UTC-6 (Central (CST))
  - Summer (DST): UTC-5 (CDT)
- ZIP code: 54536
- Area codes: 715 & 534
- GNIS feature ID: 1566963

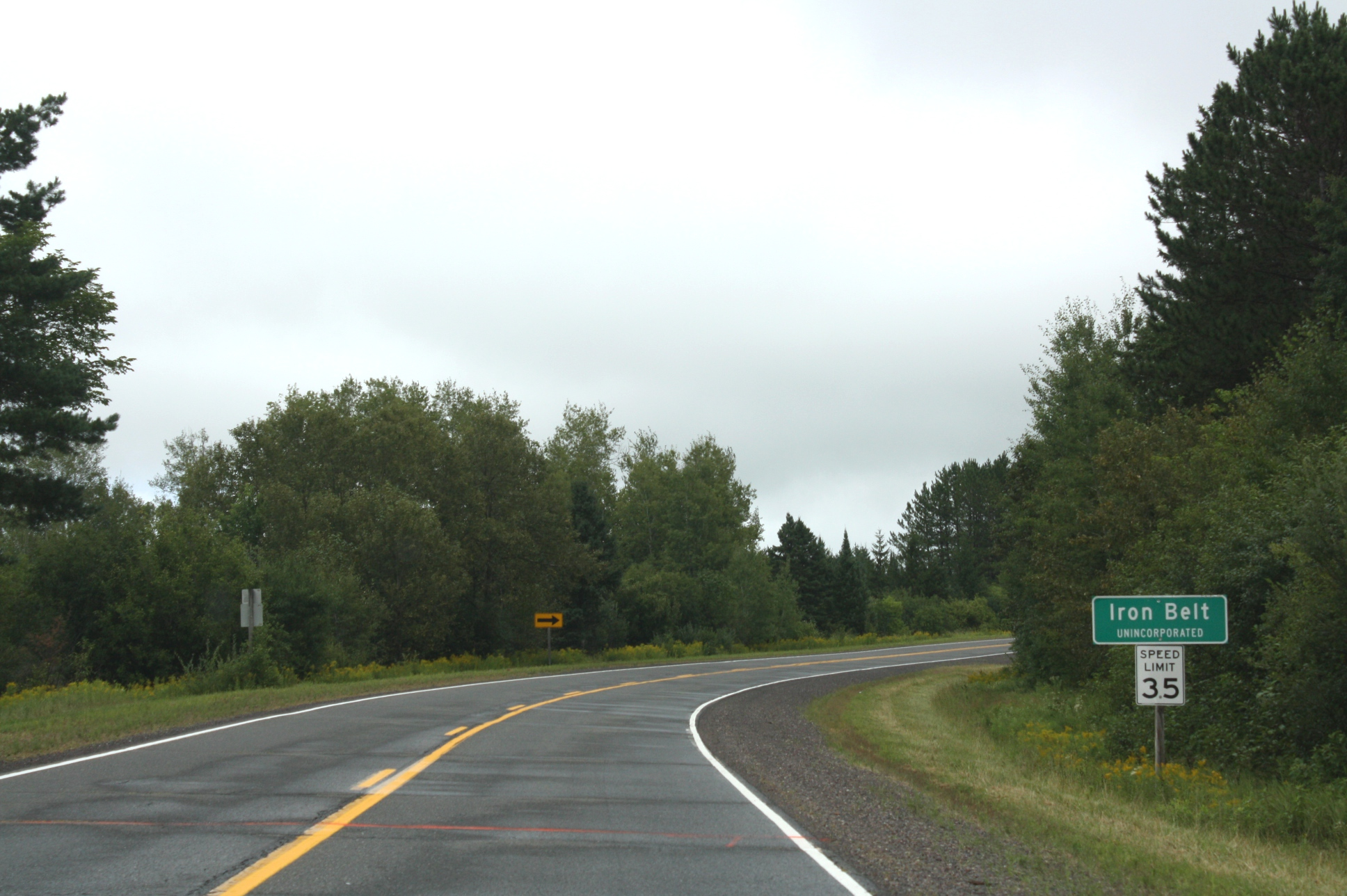
Sign on WIS77

Iron Belt is an unincorporated census-designated place located in Iron County, Wisconsin, United States. Iron Belt is located on Wisconsin Highway 77, southwest of Montreal, in the town of Knight. Iron Belt has a post office with ZIP code 54536. As of the 2020 census, its population was 158.

Iron Belt was the birthplace of Karl Emil Nygard, who was the first and only mayor in U.S. history to be a Communist.
