= Upson, Wisconsin =

- Unincorporated community
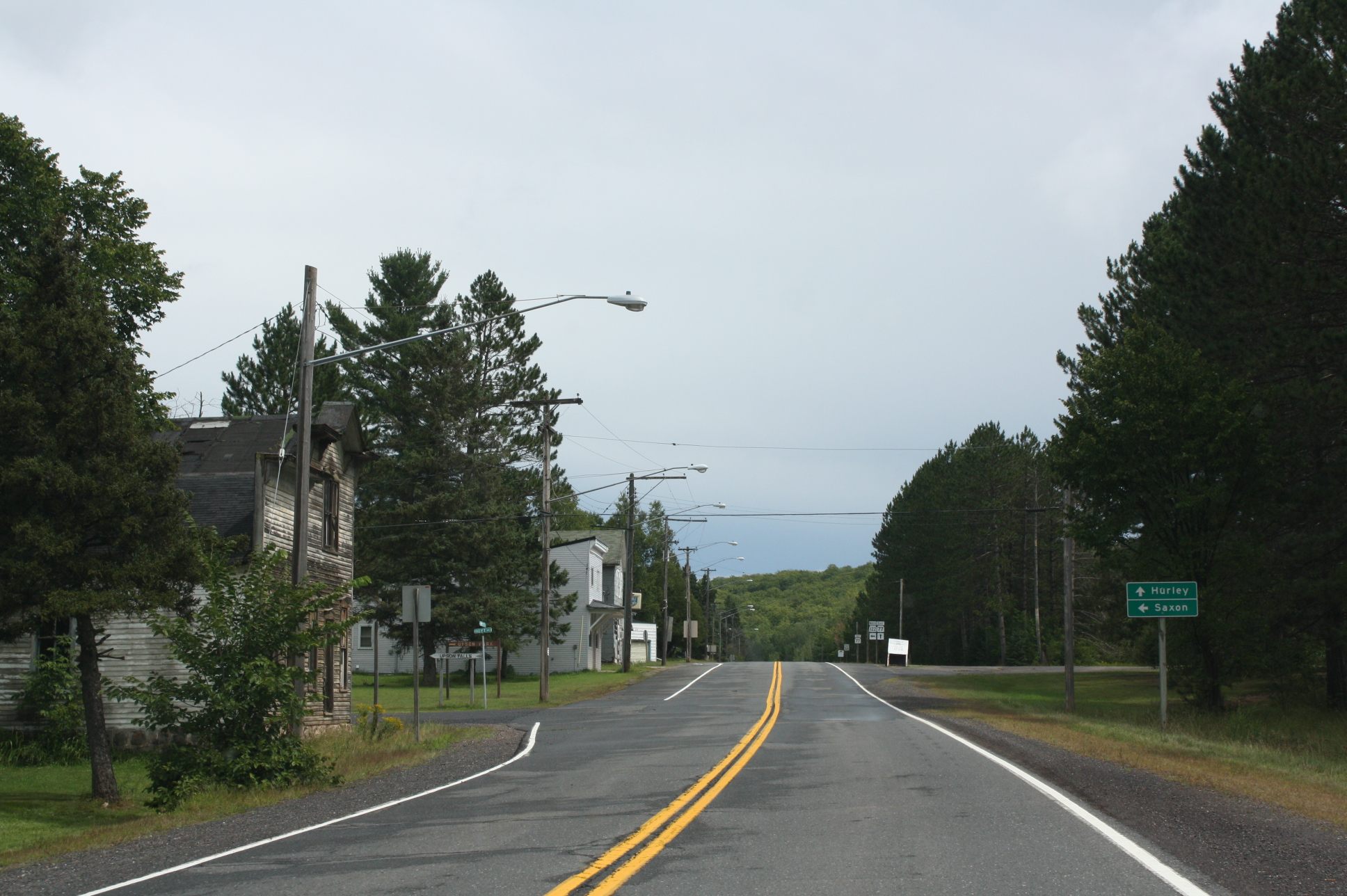
- Looking east in Upson on WIS77

- Location within Wisconsin Location within the United States
- Coordinates: 46°22′09″N 90°24′25″W
- Country: United States
- State: Wisconsin
- County: Iron
- Town: Anderson
- Elevation: 1,489 ft (454 m)
- Time zone: UTC-6 (Central (CST))
  - Summer (DST): UTC-5 (CDT)
- ZIP code: 54565
- Area codes: 715 & 534
- GNIS feature ID: 1576004

Upson is an unincorporated community located in Iron County, Wisconsin, United States. Upson is located at the junction of state highways 77 and 122, 12 miles (19 km) southwest of Hurley, in the town of Anderson. Upson had an Air Defense Command radar station of the Permanent System radar network (P-16B, 46°25′10″N 090°23′06″W) and a post office, which closed on March 16, 1985. One of the three people that surveyed the area was named Upson.

== Images ==
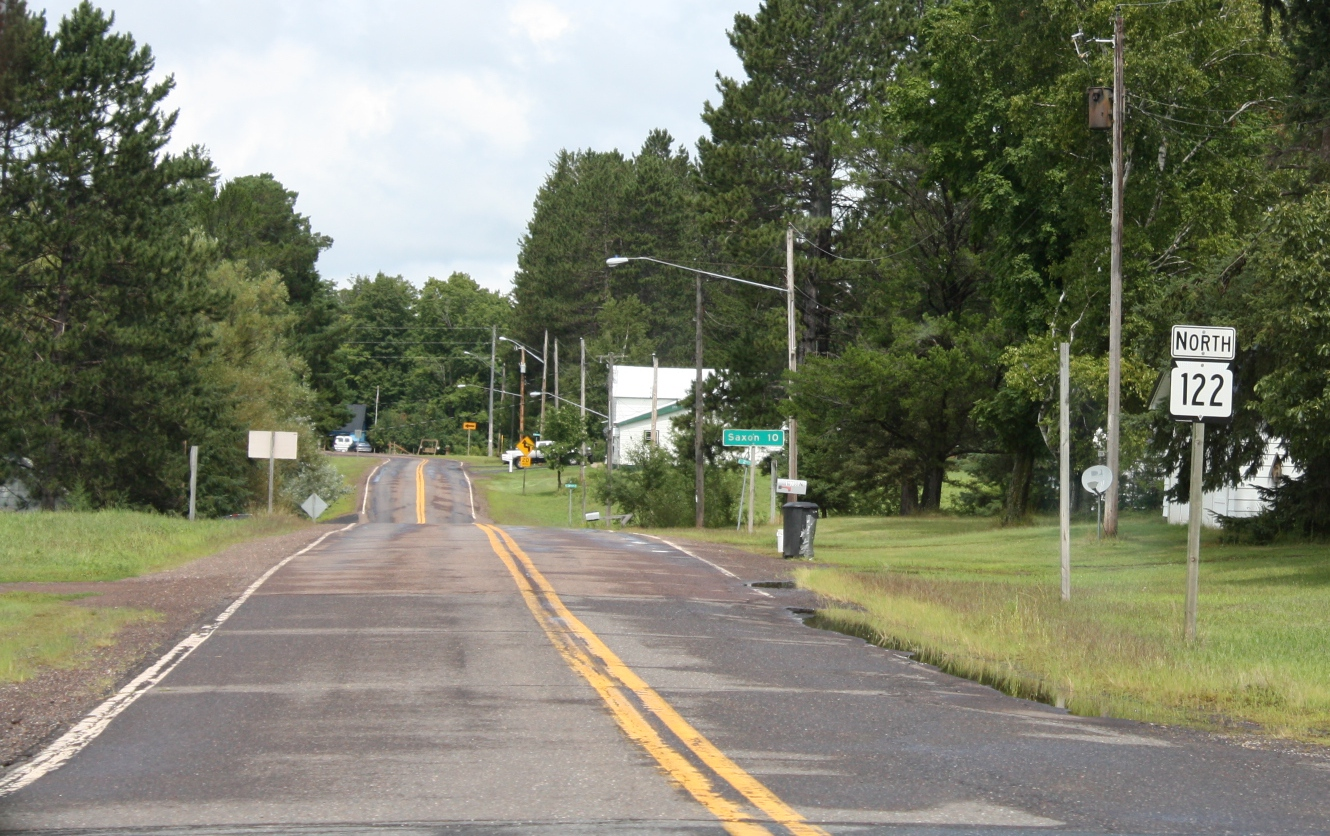
Looking north at Upson from southern terminus of WIS122

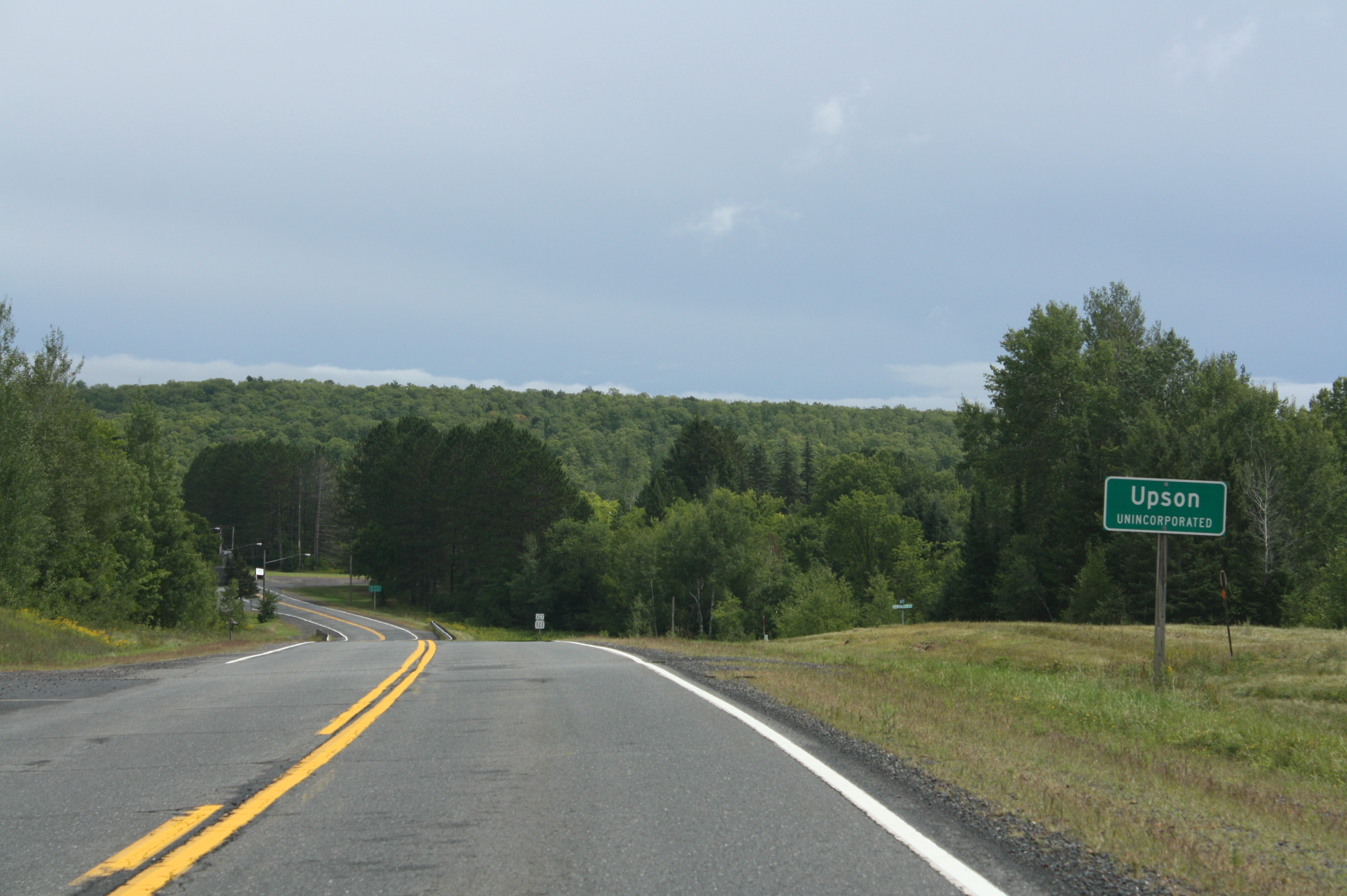
Looking east at the sign for Upson on WIS77

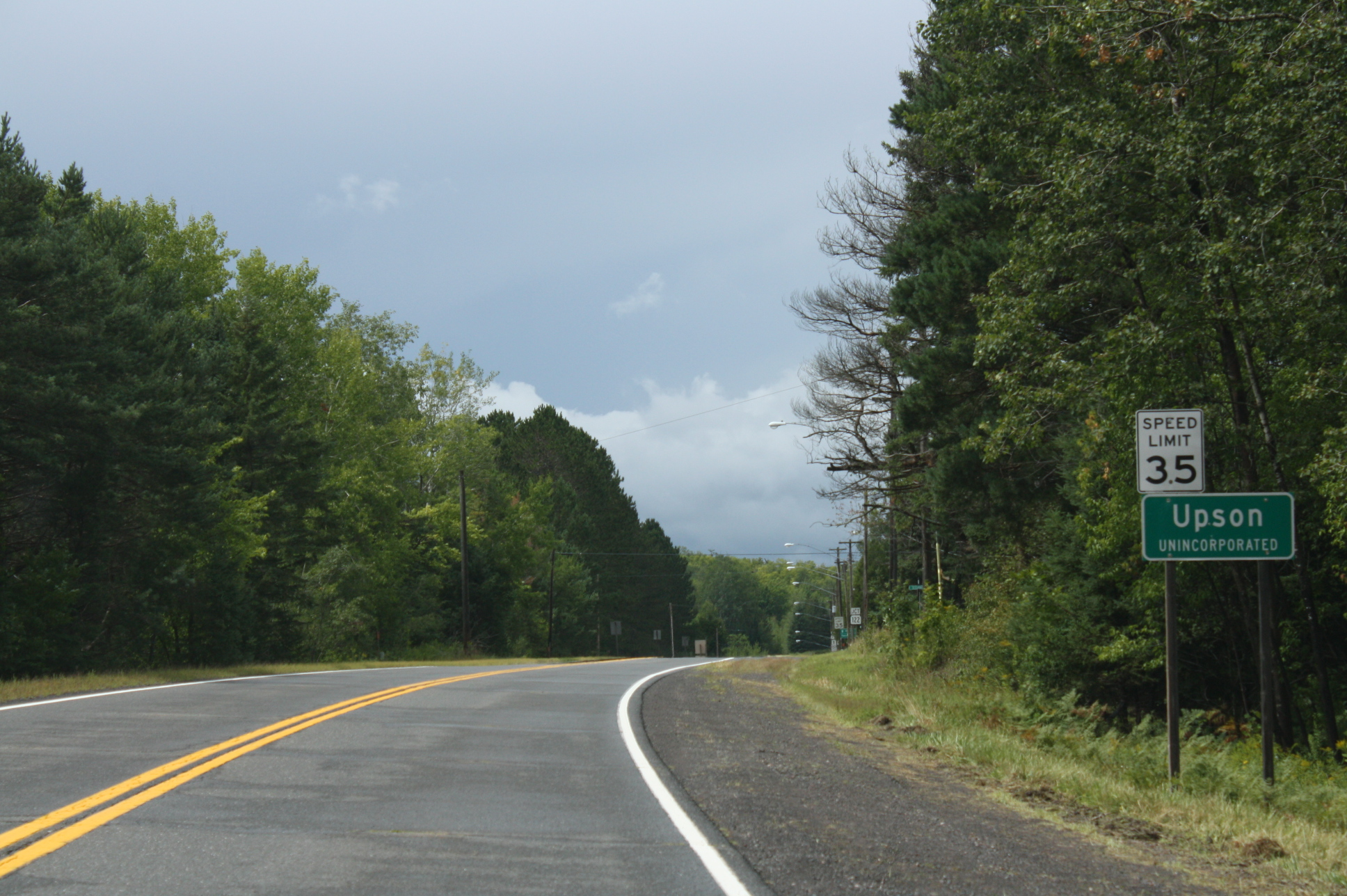
Looking west at the sign for Upson on WIS77
