= Anderson, Iron County, Wisconsin =

Anderson, Wisconsin
- Town
- Location in Iron County and the state of Wisconsin.
- Coordinates: 46°21′55″N 90°26′32″W
- Country: United States
- State: Wisconsin
- County: Iron

Area
  - Total: 83.6 sq mi (216.5 km^{2})
  - Land: 83.2 sq mi (215.4 km^{2})
  - Water: 0.42 sq mi (1.1 km^{2})
- Elevation: 1,726 ft (526 m)

Population (2020)
  - Total: 54
  - Density: 0.65/sq mi (0.25/km^{2})
- Time zone: UTC-6 (Central (CST))
  - Summer (DST): UTC-5 (CDT)
- Area codes: 715 & 534
- FIPS code: 55-01925
- GNIS feature ID: 1582694

Anderson is a town in Iron County, Wisconsin, United States. The population was 54 at the 2020 census. The unincorporated communities of Rouse, Tyler Forks, and Upson are located in the town.

== History ==
It was created from the Town of Knight on March 14, 1900, as the Town of Vogel and renamed in 1903 to honor local pioneer and first Town Chair J.P. Anderson.

== Geography ==
According to the United States Census Bureau, the town has a total area of 83.6 square miles (216.5 km^{2}), of which 83.2 square miles (215.5 km^{2}) is land and 0.4 square mile (1.1 km^{2}) (0.50%) is water.

== Demographics ==
As of the census of 2000, there were 61 people, 28 households, and 16 families residing in the town. The population density was 0.7 people per square mile (0.3/km^{2}). There were 118 housing units at an average density of 1.4 per square mile (0.5/km^{2}). The racial makeup of the town was 98.36% White, and 1.64% from two or more races.

There were 28 households, out of which 25.0% had children under the age of 18 living with them, 60.7% were married couples living together, and 39.3% were non-families. 35.7% of all households were made up of individuals, and 14.3% had someone living alone who was 65 years of age or older. The average household size was 2.18 and the average family size was 2.88.

In the town, the population was spread out, with 21.3% under the age of 18, 3.3% from 18 to 24, 32.8% from 25 to 44, 24.6% from 45 to 64, and 18.0% who were 65 years of age or older. The median age was 43 years. For every 100 females, there were 103.3 males. For every 100 females age 18 and over, there were 100.0 males.

The median income for a household in the town was $15,417, and the median income for a family was $32,500. Males had a median income of $39,375 versus $19,167 for females. The per capita income for the town was $17,611. There were no families and 10.9% of the population living below the poverty line, including no under eighteens and 21.4% of those over 64.
