= Pence, Wisconsin =

- Town
- Location in Iron County and the state of Wisconsin.
- Coordinates: 46°22′41″N 90°15′4″W
- Country: United States
- State: Wisconsin
- County: Iron

Area
  - Total: 36.1 sq mi (93.5 km^{2})
  - Land: 32.2 sq mi (83.3 km^{2})
  - Water: 3.9 sq mi (10.2 km^{2})
- Elevation: 1,617 ft (493 m)

Population (2020)
  - Total: 160
  - Density: 5.0/sq mi (1.9/km^{2})
- Time zone: UTC-6 (Central (CST))
  - Summer (DST): UTC-5 (CDT)
- Area codes: 715 & 534
- FIPS code: 55-61825
- GNIS feature ID: 1583906

Pence is a town in Iron County, Wisconsin, United States. The population was 160 at the 2020 census. The census-designated place of Pence is located in the town. The unincorporated community of Germania is also located in the town.

== History ==
It was created on May 7, 1923, as the Town of Clement.

== Geography ==
According to the United States Census Bureau, the town has a total area of 36.1 square miles (93.5 km^{2}), of which 32.2 square miles (83.3 km^{2}) is land and 3.9 square miles (10.2 km^{2}) (10.91%) is water.

== Demographics ==
As of the census of 2000, there were 198 people, 84 households, and 57 families residing in the town. The population density was 6.2 people per square mile (2.4/km^{2}). There were 136 housing units at an average density of 4.2 per square mile (1.6/km^{2}). The racial makeup of the town was 97.47% White, 0.51% Asian, 0.51% from other races, and 1.52% from two or more races. Hispanic or Latino of any race were 1.52% of the population.

There were 84 households, out of which 27.4% had children under the age of 18 living with them, 57.1% were married couples living together, 6.0% had a female householder with no husband present, and 32.1% were non-families. 25.0% of all households were made up of individuals, and 21.4% had someone living alone who was 65 years of age or older. The average household size was 2.36 and the average family size was 2.79.

In the town, the population was spread out, with 23.2% under the age of 18, 3.5% from 18 to 24, 25.8% from 25 to 44, 21.7% from 45 to 64, and 25.8% who were 65 years of age or older. The median age was 43 years. For every 100 females, there were 85.0 males. For every 100 females age 18 and over, there were 92.4 males.

The median income for a household in the town was $31,250, and the median income for a family was $35,833. Males had a median income of $27,500 versus $19,375 for females. The per capita income for the town was $14,070. None of the families and 2.1% of the population were living below the poverty line, including no under eighteens and 6.7% of those over 64.

== Notable people ==
- Paul Alfonsi, Wisconsin State Assembly
