= Annala Round Barn =

- U.S. National Register of Historic Places
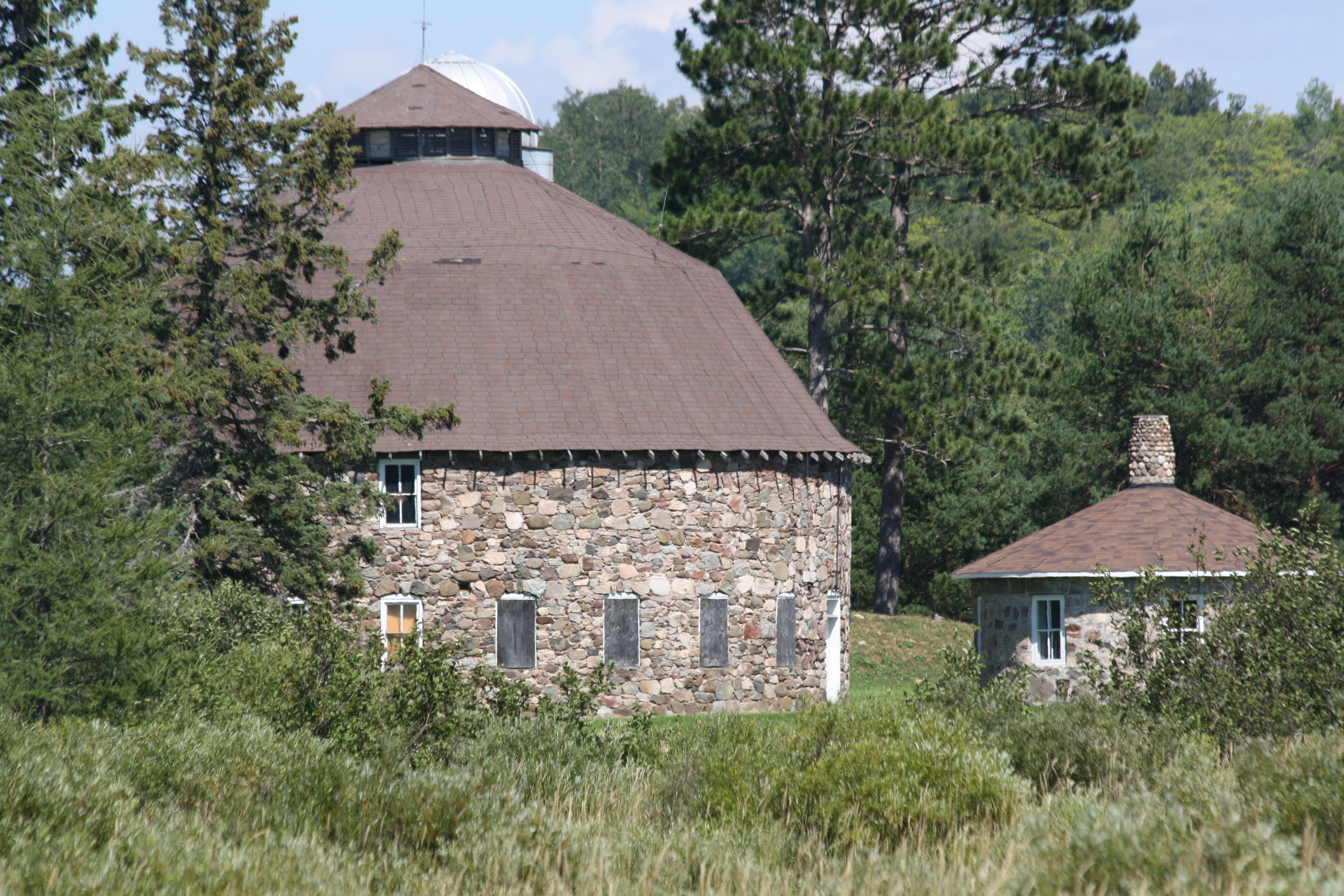
- Contributing buildings

- Location within Wisconsin Location within the United States
- Nearest city: Hurley, Wisconsin
- Coordinates: 46°25′5″N 90°9′41″W
- Area: 0.2 acres (0.081 ha)
- Built: 1921
- Built by: Annala, Matthew
- NRHP reference No.: 79000085
- Added to NRHP: August 27, 1979

The Annala Round Barn near Hurley, Wisconsin, United States, is a round barn that was built in 1921 according to the NRIS database. It was listed on the National Register of Historic Places in 1979. The listing included two contributing buildings.

According to another source, it was built in 1917 by Finnish stonemason Matt Annala.

It is asserted to be the "only barn in Wisconsin entirely made of massive field stones."
