= Saxon, Wisconsin =

- Town
- Location in Iron County and the state of Wisconsin.
- Coordinates: 46°29′52″N 90°25′10″W
- Country: United States
- State: Wisconsin
- County: Iron

Area
  - Total: 66.1 sq mi (171.3 km^{2})
  - Land: 66.1 sq mi (171.1 km^{2})
  - Water: 0.077 sq mi (0.2 km^{2})
- Elevation: 1,135 ft (346 m)

Population (2020)
  - Total: 290
  - Density: 4.4/sq mi (1.7/km^{2})
- Time zone: UTC-6 (Central (CST))
  - Summer (DST): UTC-5 (CDT)
- Area codes: 715 & 534
- FIPS code: 55-71875
- GNIS feature ID: 1584106

Saxon is a town in Iron County, Wisconsin, United States. The population was 290 at the 2020 census. The census-designated place of Saxon is located in the town.

== Culture ==
Each August, Saxon hosts the Iron County Fair.

A small portion of the film, A Simple Plan was filmed near a one lane gravel road and farm house in Saxon.

== Geography ==
According to the United States Census Bureau, the town has a total area of 66.1 square miles (171.3 km^{2}), of which 66.1 square miles (171.1 km^{2}) is land and 0.1 square mile (0.2 km^{2}) (0.09%) is water.

=== Climate ===
Climate data for Saxon 1WSW, Wisconsin, 1991–2020 normals, 1952-2020 extremes: 1165ft (355m)
Month	Jan	Feb	Mar	Apr	May	Jun	Jul	Aug	Sep	Oct	Nov	Dec	Year
Record high °F (°C)	58 (14)	63 (17)	80 (27)	92 (33)	92 (33)	100 (38)	100 (38)	99 (37)	99 (37)	87 (31)	75 (24)	60 (16)	100 (38)
Mean maximum °F (°C)	39.6 (4.2)	45.4 (7.4)	58.6 (14.8)	74.2 (23.4)	83.8 (28.8)	87.5 (30.8)	89.3 (31.8)	88.0 (31.1)	83.8 (28.8)	75.4 (24.1)	57.6 (14.2)	43.5 (6.4)	91.3 (32.9)
Mean daily maximum °F (°C)	21.3 (−5.9)	25.9 (−3.4)	36.7 (2.6)	48.9 (9.4)	63.7 (17.6)	73.0 (22.8)	77.6 (25.3)	75.9 (24.4)	68.3 (20.2)	54.5 (12.5)	38.7 (3.7)	26.7 (−2.9)	50.9 (10.5)
Daily mean °F (°C)	13.0 (−10.6)	16.1 (−8.8)	26.5 (−3.1)	39.0 (3.9)	52.3 (11.3)	61.9 (16.6)	66.9 (19.4)	65.3 (18.5)	58.0 (14.4)	45.2 (7.3)	31.6 (−0.2)	19.5 (−6.9)	41.3 (5.2)
Mean daily minimum °F (°C)	4.7 (−15.2)	6.2 (−14.3)	16.2 (−8.8)	29.0 (−1.7)	40.9 (4.9)	50.7 (10.4)	56.2 (13.4)	54.8 (12.7)	47.7 (8.7)	36.0 (2.2)	24.6 (−4.1)	12.3 (−10.9)	31.6 (−0.2)
Mean minimum °F (°C)	−21.3 (−29.6)	−20.3 (−29.1)	−10.7 (−23.7)	12.3 (−10.9)	25.2 (−3.8)	33.8 (1.0)	42.0 (5.6)	41.0 (5.0)	30.7 (−0.7)	22.6 (−5.2)	3.5 (−15.8)	−12.8 (−24.9)	−24.5 (−31.4)
Record low °F (°C)	−36 (−38)	−37 (−38)	−33 (−36)	−4 (−20)	8 (−13)	20 (−7)	33 (1)	32 (0)	25 (−4)	12 (−11)	−13 (−25)	−30 (−34)	−37 (−38)
Average precipitation inches (mm)	1.69 (43)	1.68 (43)	2.14 (54)	3.19 (81)	3.56 (90)	4.16 (106)	4.33 (110)	3.81 (97)	3.96 (101)	4.06 (103)	2.57 (65)	2.34 (59)	37.49 (952)
Average snowfall inches (cm)	30.90 (78.5)	24.50 (62.2)	17.90 (45.5)	7.90 (20.1)	0.70 (1.8)	0.00 (0.00)	0.00 (0.00)	0.00 (0.00)	0.20 (0.51)	2.00 (5.1)	17.60 (44.7)	32.70 (83.1)	134.4 (341.51)
Source 1: NOAA
Source 2: XMACIS (records & monthly max/mins)

== Demographics ==
As of the census of 2000, there were 350 people, 148 households, and 104 families residing in the town. The population density was 5.3 people per square mile (2.0/km^{2}). There were 221 housing units at an average density of 3.3 per square mile (1.3/km^{2}). The racial makeup of the town was 97.14% White, 0.57% African American, 0.86% Native American, and 1.43% from two or more races.

There were 148 households, out of which 27.0% had children under the age of 18 living with them, 58.8% were married couples living together, 6.1% had a female householder with no husband present, and 29.1% were non-families. 25.7% of all households were made up of individuals, and 12.2% had someone living alone who was 65 years of age or older. The average household size was 2.36 and the average family size was 2.82.

In the town, the population was spread out, with 21.7% under the age of 18, 6.6% from 18 to 24, 28.0% from 25 to 44, 26.0% from 45 to 64, and 17.7% who were 65 years of age or older. The median age was 41 years. For every 100 females, there were 93.4 males. For every 100 females age 18 and over, there were 95.7 males.

The median income for a household in the town was $27,212, and the median income for a family was $36,111. Males had a median income of $31,250 versus $25,000 for females. The per capita income for the town was $16,705. About 6.6% of families and 9.9% of the population were below the poverty line, including 22.2% of those under age 18 and 5.1% of those age 65 or over.
