= Iron County, Wisconsin =

County in Wisconsin, United States

- County
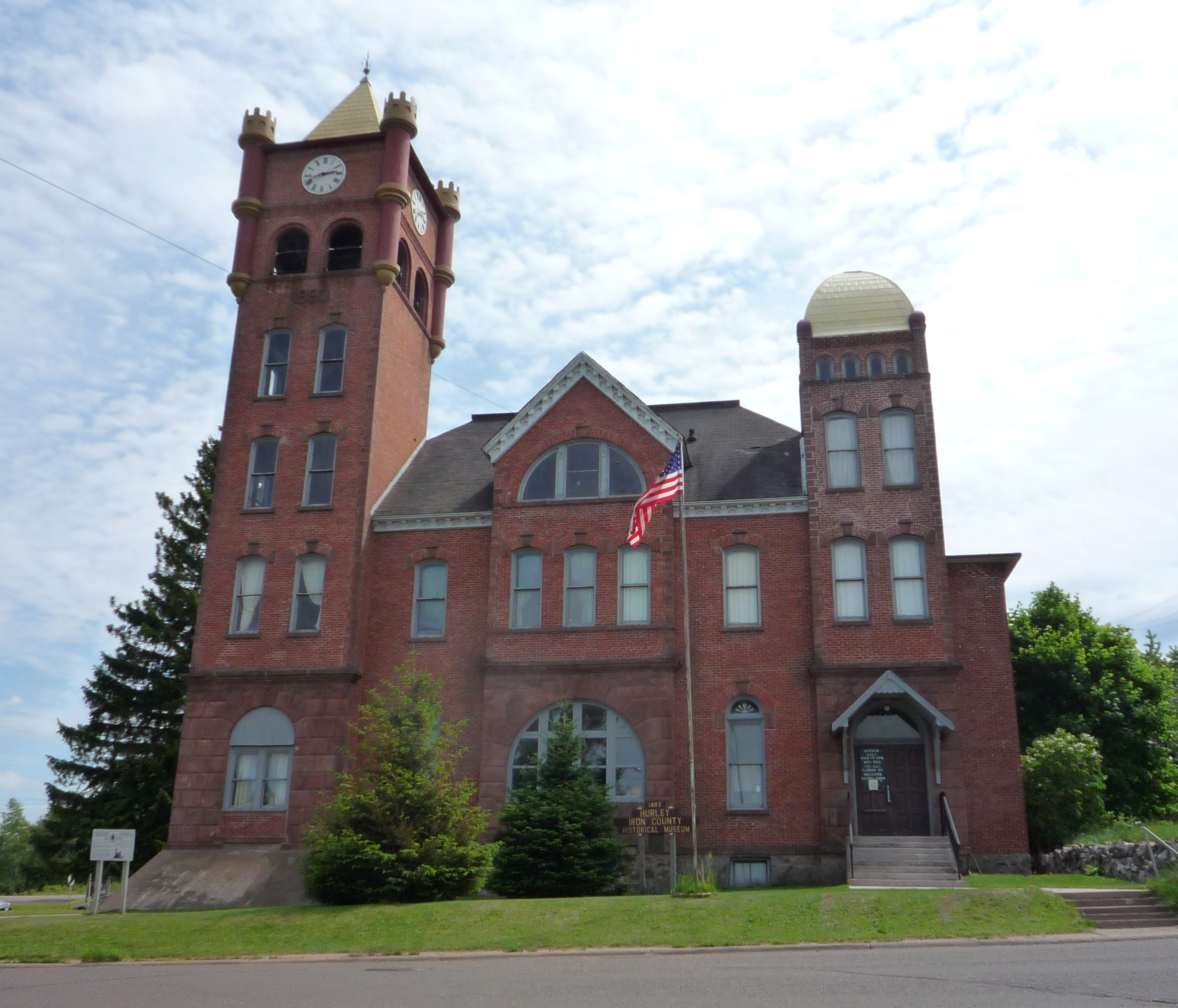
- The Old Iron County Courthouse (now the Iron County Historical Museum) in Hurley, Wisconsin.

- Location within the U.S. state of Wisconsin
- Coordinates: 46°20′N 90°16′W
- Country: United States
- State: Wisconsin
- Founded: 1893
- Named for: Iron ore
- Seat: Hurley
- Largest city: Hurley

Area
  - Total: 919 sq mi (2,380 km^{2})
  - Land: 758 sq mi (1,960 km^{2})
  - Water: 161 sq mi (420 km^{2}) 18%

Population (2020)
  - Total: 6,137
  - Estimate (2025): 6,127 ▼
  - Density: 8.1/sq mi (3.1/km^{2})
- Time zone: UTC−6 (Central)
  - Summer (DST): UTC−5 (CDT)
- Congressional district: 7th
- Website: www.co.iron.wi.gov

Iron County is a county located in the U.S. state of Wisconsin. As of the 2020 census, the population was 6,137, making it the third-least populous county in Wisconsin. Its county seat is Hurley. Lying within the Gogebic Range, it was named for the valuable iron ore found within its borders. The county overlaps with small parts of the Bad River and Lac du Flambeau Indian reservations. The county is considered a high-recreation retirement destination by the U.S. Department of Agriculture.

== Geography ==
According to the U.S. Census Bureau, the county has a total area of 919 square miles (2,380 km^{2}), of which 758 square miles (1,960 km^{2}) is land and 161 square miles (420 km^{2}) (18%) is water.

=== Adjacent counties ===
- Vilas County – east, southeast
- Price County – southwest
- Ashland County – west
- Gogebic County, Michigan – northeast

=== Major highways ===
- U.S. Highway 2
- U.S. Highway 51
- Highway 47 (Wisconsin)
- Highway 77 (Wisconsin)
- Highway 122 (Wisconsin)
- Highway 169 (Wisconsin)
- Highway 182 (Wisconsin)

=== County Highways ===
- CTH-A
- CTH-B
- CTH-C
- CTH-CC
- CTH-D
- CTH-FF
- CTH-G
- CTH-H
- CTH-J

=== Railroads ===
- Watco

=== Airport ===
- KIWD – Gogebic–Iron County Airport – Commercial air service is available.

== Demographics ==
Historical population
Census	Pop.	Note	%±
1900	6,616		—
1910	8,306		25.5%
1920	10,261		23.5%
1930	9,933		−3.2%
1940	10,049		1.2%
1950	8,714		−13.3%
1960	7,830		−10.1%
1970	6,533		−16.6%
1980	6,730		3.0%
1990	6,153		−8.6%
2000	6,861		11.5%
2010	5,916		−13.8%
2020	6,137		3.7%
2025 (est.)	6,127	▼	−0.2%
U.S. Decennial Census; 1790–1960 1900–1990; 1990–2000 2010 2020

=== Racial and ethnic composition ===
Iron County, Wisconsin – Racial and ethnic composition Note: the US Census treats Hispanic/Latino as an ethnic category. This table excludes Latinos from the racial categories and assigns them to a separate category. Hispanics/Latinos may be of any race.
Race / ethnicity	Pop 1980	Pop 1990	Pop 2000	Pop 2010	Pop 2020	% 1980	% 1990	% 2000	% 2010	% 2020
White alone (NH)	6,669	6,117	6,714	5,772	5,809	99.09%	99.41%	97.86%	97.57%	94.66%
Black or African American alone (NH)	19	1	4	3	11	0.28%	0.02%	0.06%	0.05%	0.18%
Native American or Alaska Native alone (NH)	12	25	38	33	63	0.18%	0.41%	0.55%	0.56%	1.03%
Asian alone (NH)	13	2	7	18	13	0.19%	0.03%	0.10%	0.30%	0.21%
Native Hawaiian or Pacific Islander alone (NH)	—N/a	—N/a	3	0	0	—N/a	—N/a	0.04%	0.00%	0.00%
Other race alone (NH)	1	0	0	0	27	0.01%	0.00%	0.00%	0.00%	0.44%
Mixed race or Multiracial (NH)	—N/a	—N/a	50	55	142	—N/a	—N/a	0.73%	0.93%	2.31%
Hispanic or Latino (any race)	16	8	45	35	72	0.24%	0.13%	0.66%	0.59%	1.17%
Total	6,730	6,153	6,861	5,916	6,137	100.00%	100.00%	100.00%	100.00%	100.00%

=== 2020 census ===
As of the 2020 census, the county had a population of 6,137, which resulted in a population density of 8.1 people per square mile (3.1 people/km^{2}). There were 5,523 housing units at an average density of 7.3 units per square mile (2.8 units/km^{2}).

There were 3,035 households in the county, of which 16.4% had children under the age of 18 living in them. Of all households, 44.1% were married-couple households, 25.1% were households with a male householder and no spouse or partner present, and 22.5% were households with a female householder and no spouse or partner present. About 37.0% of all households were made up of individuals and 18.4% had someone living alone who was 65 years of age or older. Among occupied housing units, 81.1% were owner-occupied and 18.9% were renter-occupied. The homeowner vacancy rate was 2.3% and the rental vacancy rate was 11.2%.

The median age was 56.4 years. 14.4% of residents were under the age of 18 and 31.9% of residents were 65 years of age or older. For every 100 females there were 103.7 males, and for every 100 females age 18 and over there were 102.6 males.

The racial makeup of the county was 95.0% White, 0.3% Black or African American, 1.1% American Indian and Alaska Native, 0.2% Asian, <0.1% Native Hawaiian and Pacific Islander, 0.7% from some other race, and 2.8% from two or more races. Hispanic or Latino residents of any race comprised 1.2% of the population.

32.8% of residents lived in urban areas, while 67.2% lived in rural areas.

=== 2010 census ===
As of the 2010 United States census, there were 5,916 people living in the county. 97.9% were White, 0.6% Native American, 0.3% Asian, 0.1% Black or African American, 0.2% of some other race and 0.9% of two or more races. 0.6% were Hispanic or Latino (of any race). 22.9% were of German, 13.7% Italian, 12.6% Finnish, 8.2% Polish, 6.6% American and 5.4% Irish ancestry.

=== 2000 census ===
2000 Census Age Pyramid for Iron County.

As of the census of 2000, there were 6,861 people, 3,083 households, and 1,960 families living in the county. The population density was 9 people per square mile (3.5 people/km^{2}). There were 5,706 housing units at an average density of 8 units per square mile (3.1 units/km^{2}). The racial makeup of the county was 98.28% White, 0.09% Black or African American, 0.60% Native American, 0.13% Asian, 0.04% Pacific Islander, 0.06% from other races, and 0.80% from two or more races. 0.66% of the population were Hispanic or Latino of any race. 20.9% were of German, 18.6% Italian, 15.2% Finnish, 9.3% Polish and 6.4% Irish ancestry. 97.1% spoke English as their first language.

There were 3,083 households, out of which 22.20% had children under the age of 18 living with them, 53.00% were married couples living together, 7.00% had a female householder with no husband present, and 36.40% were non-families. 32.00% of all households were made up of individuals, and 16.30% had someone living alone who was 65 years of age or older. The average household size was 2.19 and the average family size was 2.74.

In the county, the population was spread out, with 19.40% under the age of 18, 5.90% from 18 to 24, 24.70% from 25 to 44, 26.80% from 45 to 64, and 23.20% who were 65 years of age or older. The median age was 45 years. For every 100 females there were 96.10 males. For every 100 females age 18 and over, there were 96.80 males.

In 2017, there were 34 births, giving a general fertility rate of 46.1 births per 1000 women aged 15–44, the 2nd lowest rate out of 72 Wisconsin counties. 13 of the births were to unmarried mothers, 21 were to married mothers. Additionally, there were no reported induced abortions performed on women of Iron County residence in 2017.

== Communities ==
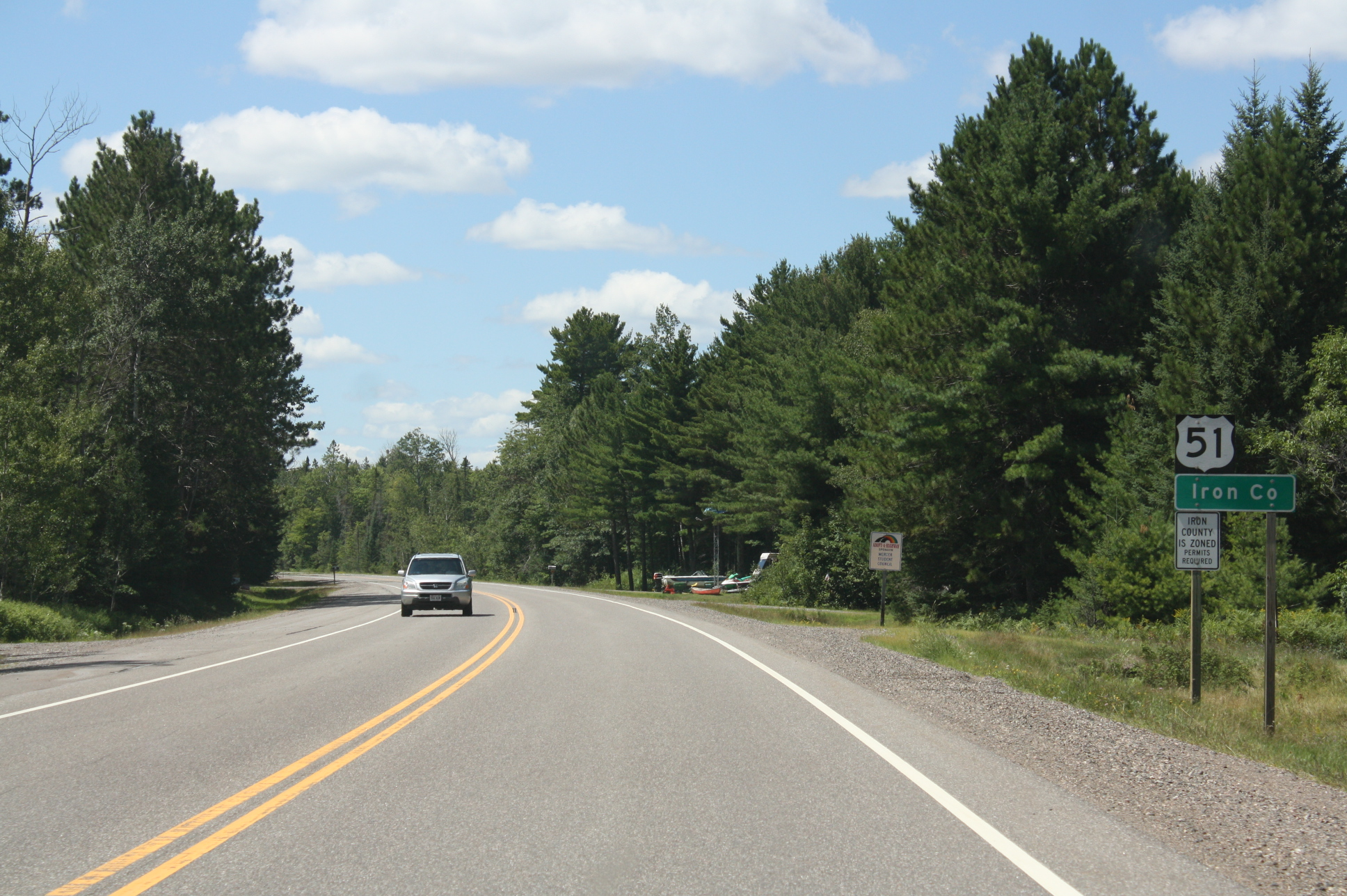
Entrance sign on US 51

=== Cities ===
- Hurley (county seat)
- Montreal

=== Towns ===
- Anderson
- Carey
- Gurney
- Kimball
- Knight
- Mercer
- Oma
- Pence
- Saxon
- Sherman

=== Census-designated places ===
- Iron Belt
- Mercer
- Pence
- Saxon

=== Unincorporated communities ===
- Carter
- Cedar
- Germania
- Gurney
- Hoyt
- Kimball
- Manitowish
- Pine Lake
- Orva
- Powell
- Rouse
- Springstead
- Tyler Forks
- Upson
- Van Buskirk

== Historical sites ==
The National Register of Historic Places lists the following historic sites in Iron County:

Site	Area of significance	Year added
Annala Round Barn	Architecture, agriculture	1979
Montreal Company Location Historic District	Landscape architecture, community planning and development, industry	1980
Old Iron County Courthouse	Politics/government, architecture	1977
Plummer Mine Headframe	Engineering, industry	1997
Springstead	Architecture, exploration/settlement	1997

== Politics ==
United States presidential election results for Iron County, Wisconsin
Year	Republican		Democratic		Third party(ies)	
Year	No.	%	No.	%	No.	%
1896	1,288	72.04%	472	26.40%	28	1.57%
1900	1,318	76.81%	356	20.75%	42	2.45%
1904	1,250	81.12%	246	15.96%	45	2.92%
1908	1,134	73.92%	314	20.47%	86	5.61%
1912	473	39.98%	347	29.33%	363	30.68%
1916	672	54.63%	475	38.62%	83	6.75%
1920	1,714	77.70%	268	12.15%	224	10.15%
1924	1,058	40.17%	84	3.19%	1,492	56.64%
1928	1,274	40.68%	1,724	55.04%	134	4.28%
1932	891	25.29%	2,338	66.36%	294	8.35%
1936	902	20.78%	3,319	76.46%	120	2.76%
1940	1,672	31.73%	3,525	66.90%	72	1.37%
1944	1,345	31.51%	2,894	67.81%	29	0.68%
1948	1,281	30.43%	2,665	63.32%	263	6.25%
1952	1,733	39.24%	2,662	60.28%	21	0.48%
1956	1,930	46.22%	2,226	53.30%	20	0.48%
1960	1,290	30.94%	2,873	68.90%	7	0.17%
1964	963	27.67%	2,514	72.24%	3	0.09%
1968	1,137	34.30%	1,913	57.71%	265	7.99%
1972	1,723	49.93%	1,648	47.75%	80	2.32%
1976	1,340	35.26%	2,399	63.13%	61	1.61%
1980	1,811	45.04%	1,941	48.27%	269	6.69%
1984	1,667	45.63%	1,967	53.85%	19	0.52%
1988	1,599	43.04%	2,090	56.26%	26	0.70%
1992	1,273	32.72%	1,762	45.28%	856	22.00%
1996	1,260	35.68%	1,725	48.85%	546	15.46%
2000	1,734	49.44%	1,620	46.19%	153	4.36%
2004	1,884	48.57%	1,956	50.43%	39	1.01%
2008	1,464	42.66%	1,914	55.77%	54	1.57%
2012	1,790	49.28%	1,784	49.12%	58	1.60%
2016	2,081	59.24%	1,275	36.29%	157	4.47%
2020	2,438	60.80%	1,533	38.23%	39	0.97%
2024	2,557	62.61%	1,487	36.41%	40	0.98%

During the 1930s and 1940s at the state level Iron county was a stronghold for the Wisconsin Progressive Party - National Progressives. voting consistently for Philip La Follette during gubernatorial elections and Robert M. La Follette Jr. for senate. From 1928 to 1996, Iron County voted Democratic in presidential elections, the only exception being Richard Nixon's landslide in 1972. In 2000, George W. Bush became only the second Republican since 1920 to carry Iron County despite narrowly losing the national popular vote, and the county remained a competitive county for the next three elections, narrowly voting for Kerry in 2004 and for Romney in 2012. Recent elections have seen the county trend solidly Republican however; in 2016, Trump won the county with 59.2% (the first time a Republican had won an outright majority in the county since 1920), and in 2020, he increased his vote share to 60.8%, and further expanding it to 62.6% (a difference of 1,070 votes) in 2024.

== See also ==
- National Register of Historic Places listings in Iron County, Wisconsin
