= James H. Carroll =

20th century American politician

Member of the Wisconsin Senate from the 12th district
- In office January 6, 1941 – January 1, 1945
- Preceded by: Joseph E. McDermid
- Succeeded by: Ernest A. Heden
- In office January 5, 1925 – January 2, 1933
- Preceded by: Chester Howell Werden
- Succeeded by: Bernard J. Gehrmann

Personal details
- Born: May 7, 1876 Eaton, Manitowoc County, Wisconsin, U.S.
- Died: October 17, 1950 (aged 74)
- Resting place: Mount Hope Cemetery, Glidden, Wisconsin
- Party: Republican
- Spouse: Mattie N. Nash

James Henry Carroll (May 7, 1876 – October 17, 1950) was an American businessman and Republican politician from Ashland County, Wisconsin. He was a member of the Wisconsin Senate for 12 years, representing Wisconsin's 12th Senate district from 1925 to 1933, and from 1941 to 1945.

== Biography ==
Carroll was primarily engaged in the real estate and insurance businesses, also having worked as a teacher and a banker. In 1938, he was a candidate for the United States House of Representatives from Wisconsin's 10th congressional district. He lost to incumbent Bernard J. Gehrmann. Carroll was a Republican.

Carroll died at the age of 74, due to a heart ailment.

Wisconsin Senate
Preceded by Chester Howell Werden	Member of the Wisconsin Senate from the 12th district January 5, 1925 – January 2, 1933	Succeeded by Bernard J. Gehrmann
Preceded by Joseph E. McDermid	Member of the Wisconsin Senate from the 12th district January 6, 1941 – January 1, 1945	Succeeded by Ernest A. Heden
