= Electoral history of Joseph W. Martin Jr. =

List of elections featuring Joseph W. Martin Jr. as a candidate

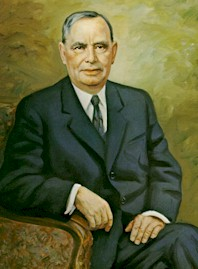
Official Speaker photo of Joseph W. Martin Jr.

Electoral history of Joseph W. Martin Jr., United States Representative for Massachusetts, from the 15th (1925–1933), 14th (1933–1963) and 10th districts (1963–1967), Speaker of the House (1947–1949, 1953–1955).

== U.S. House of Representatives ==
=== 1924 ===
Massachusetts's 15th congressional district primary election, 1924
Primary election
Party	Candidate	Votes	%
Republican	William S. Greene (incumbent) (Note: Greene died on September 22, and was replaced by Robert M. Leach as the Republican nominee for the special election held concurrently with the general election that day.)	13,193	55.45
Republican	Joseph W. Martin Jr.	10,599	44.55
Total votes		23,792	100.00

Massachusetts's 15th congressional district election, 1924
Party	Candidate	Votes	%
Republican	Joseph W. Martin Jr.	33,360	58.4
Democratic	Arthur J.B. Cartier	23,764	41.6
Total votes		57,124	100.00

=== 1926 ===
Massachusetts's 15th congressional district election, 1926
Party	Candidate	Votes	%
Republican	Joseph W. Martin Jr. (incumbent)	33,687	65.22
Democratic	Minerva D. Kepple	17,963	34.78
Total votes		51,650	100.00

=== 1928 ===
Massachusetts's 15th congressional district election, 1928
Party	Candidate	Votes	%
Republican	Joseph W. Martin Jr. (incumbent)	39,905	56.78
Democratic	John F. Trainor	30,373	43.22
Total votes		70,278	100.00

=== 1930 ===
Massachusetts's 15th congressional district election, 1930
Party	Candidate	Votes	%
Republican	Joseph W. Martin Jr. (incumbent)	37,100	64.1
Democratic	William J. Murphy	20,780	35.9
Total votes		57,880	100.00

=== 1932 ===
Massachusetts's 14th congressional district election, 1932
Party	Candidate	Votes	%
Republican	Joseph W. Martin Jr. (incumbent)	51,680	56.83
Democratic	Andrew J. McGraw	39,259	43.17
Total votes		90,939	100.00

=== 1934 ===
Massachusetts's 14th congressional district election, 1934
Party	Candidate	Votes	%
Republican	Joseph W. Martin Jr. (incumbent)	46,411	54.77
Democratic	Arthur A. Seagrave	38,325	45.23
Total votes		84,736	100.00

=== 1936 ===
Massachusetts's 14th congressional district election, 1936
Party	Candidate	Votes	%
Republican	Joseph W. Martin Jr. (incumbent)	58,758	53.3
Democratic	Arthur A. Seagrave	38,609	35.02
Union	Lawrence O. Witter	12,872	11.68
Total votes		110,239	100.00

=== 1938 ===
Massachusetts's 14th congressional district election, 1938
Party	Candidate	Votes	%
Republican	Joseph W. Martin Jr. (incumbent)	63,608	58.7
Democratic	Lawrence J. Bresnahan	43,876	40.49
Progressive	Mortimer A. Sullivan	884	0.82
Total votes		108,368	100.00

=== 1940 ===
Massachusetts's 14th congressional district election, 1940
Party	Candidate	Votes	%
Republican	Joseph W. Martin Jr. (incumbent)	65,780	54.35
Democratic	Harold E. Cole	55,241	45.65
Total votes		121,021	100.00

=== 1942 ===
Massachusetts's 14th congressional district election, 1942
Party	Candidate	Votes	%
Republican	Joseph W. Martin Jr. (incumbent)	54,977	59.39
Democratic	Terrance J. Lomax Jr.	37,598	40.61
Total votes		92,575	100.00

=== 1944 ===
Massachusetts's 14th congressional district election, 1944
Party	Candidate	Votes	%
Republican	Joseph W. Martin Jr. (incumbent)	79,928	62
Democratic	Edmond P. Talbot	48,993	38
Total votes		128,921	100.00

=== 1946 ===
Massachusetts's 14th congressional district election, 1946
Party	Candidate	Votes	%
Republican	Joseph W. Martin Jr. (incumbent)	71,566	63.58
Democratic	Martha Sharp	40,999	36.42
Total votes		112,565	100.00

=== 1948 ===
Massachusetts's 14th congressional district election, 1948
Party	Candidate	Votes	%
Republican	Joseph W. Martin Jr. (incumbent)	87,973	61.37
Democratic	Joseph M. Mendonen	55,369	38.63
Total votes		143,342	100.00

=== 1950 ===
Massachusetts's 14th congressional district election, 1950
Party	Candidate	Votes	%
Republican	Joseph W. Martin Jr. (incumbent)	84,508	64.31
Democratic	Edward P. Grace	46,332	35.26
Prohibition	Paul D. Campbell	568	0.43
Total votes		131,408	100.00

=== 1952 ===
Massachusetts's 14th congressional district election, 1952
Party	Candidate	Votes	%
Republican	Joseph W. Martin Jr. (incumbent)	108,215	63.16
Democratic	Edward F. Doolan	62,554	36.51
Prohibition	Grace F. Luder	554	0.32
Total votes		171,323	100.00

=== 1954 ===
Massachusetts's 14th congressional district election, 1954
Party	Candidate	Votes	%
Republican	Joseph W. Martin Jr. (incumbent)	87,840	62.01
Democratic	Edward F. Doolan	53,818	37.99
Total votes		141,658	100.00

=== 1956 ===
Massachusetts's 14th congressional district election, 1956
Party	Candidate	Votes	%
Republican	Joseph W. Martin Jr. (incumbent)	111,420	62.38
Democratic	Edward F. Doolan	67,183	37.62
Total votes		178,603	100.00

=== 1958 ===
Massachusetts's 14th congressional district election, 1958
Party	Candidate	Votes	%
Republican	Joseph W. Martin Jr. (incumbent)	90,751	61.04
Democratic	Edward F. Doolan	57,920	38.96
Total votes		148,671	100.00

=== 1960 ===
Massachusetts's 14th congressional district election, 1960
Party	Candidate	Votes	%
Republican	Joseph W. Martin Jr. (incumbent)	115,209	60.31
Democratic	Edward F. Doolan	75,815	39.69
Total votes		191,024	100.00

=== 1962 ===
Massachusetts's 10th congressional district election, 1962
Party	Candidate	Votes	%
Republican	Joseph W. Martin Jr. (incumbent)	124,091	65.47
Democratic	Edward F. Doolan	65,443	34.53
Total votes		189,534	100.00

=== 1964 ===
Massachusetts's 10th congressional district election, 1964
Party	Candidate	Votes	%
Republican	Joseph W. Martin Jr. (incumbent)	133,403	62.98
Democratic	Edward F. Doolan	78,415	37.02
Total votes		211,818	100.00

=== 1966 ===
Massachusetts's 10th congressional district primary election, 1966
Primary election
Party	Candidate	Votes	%
Republican	Margaret Heckler	15,441	55.82
Republican	Joseph W. Martin Jr. (incumbent)	12,218	44.17
Total votes		27,659	100.00

== Speaker of the House ==
=== 1939 election ===
1939 election for speaker
Party	Candidate	Votes	%
Democratic	William B. Bankhead (AL 7) (incumbent)	249	59.29
Republican	Joseph W. Martin Jr. (MA 14)	168	40.00
Progressive	Merlin Hull (WI 9)	1	0.24
Progressive	Bernard J. Gehrmann (WI 10)	1	0.24
—	Present	1	0.24
Total votes		420	100
Votes necessary		211	>50

=== 1941 election ===
1941 election for speaker
Party	Candidate	Votes	%
Democratic	Sam Rayburn (TX 4) (incumbent)	247	60.24
Republican	Joseph W. Martin Jr. (MA 14)	159	38.79
Progressive	Merlin Hull (WI 9)	2	0.49
Progressive	Bernard J. Gehrmann (WI 10)	1	0.24
—	Present	1	0.24
Total votes		410	100
Votes necessary		206	>50

=== 1943 election ===
1943 election for speaker
Party	Candidate	Votes	%
Democratic	Sam Rayburn (TX 4) (incumbent)	217	50.93
Republican	Joseph W. Martin Jr. (MA 14)	206	48.35
Progressive	Merlin Hull (WI 9)	1	0.24
Progressive	Harry Sauthoff (WI 2)	1	0.24
—	Present	1	0.24
Total votes		426	100
Votes necessary		214	>50

=== 1945 election ===
1945 election for speaker
Party	Candidate	Votes	%
Democratic	Sam Rayburn (TX 4) (incumbent)	224	56.85
Republican	Joseph W. Martin Jr. (MA 14)	168	42.64
—	Present	2	0.51
Total votes		394	100
Votes necessary		198	>50

=== 1947 election ===
1947 election for speaker
Party	Candidate	Votes	%
Republican	Joseph W. Martin Jr. (MA 14)	244	57.28
Democratic	Sam Rayburn (TX 4) (incumbent)	182	42.72
Total votes		426	100
Votes necessary		214	>50

=== 1949 election ===
1949 election for speaker
Party	Candidate	Votes	%
Democratic	Sam Rayburn (TX 4)	255	61.30
Republican	Joseph W. Martin Jr. (MA 14) (incumbent)	160	38.46
—	Present	1	0.24
Total votes		416	100
Votes necessary		209	>50

=== 1951 election ===
1951 election for speaker
Party	Candidate	Votes	%
Democratic	Sam Rayburn (TX 4) (incumbent)	231	54.23
Republican	Joseph W. Martin Jr. (MA 14)	192	45.07
—	Present	3	0.70
Total votes		426	100
Votes necessary		214	>50

=== 1953 election ===
1953 election for speaker
Party	Candidate	Votes	%
Republican	Joseph W. Martin Jr. (MA 14)	220	51.89
Democratic	Sam Rayburn (TX 4) (incumbent)	201	47.41
—	Present	3	0.70
Total votes		424	100
Votes necessary		213	>50

===1955 election===

1955 election for speaker
Party	Candidate	Votes	%
Democratic	Sam Rayburn (TX 4)	228	53.52
Republican	Joseph W. Martin Jr. (MA 14) (incumbent)	198	46.48
Total votes		426	100
Votes necessary		214	>50

=== 1957 election ===
1957 election for speaker
Party	Candidate	Votes	%
Democratic	Sam Rayburn (TX 4) (incumbent)	227	53.04
Republican	Joseph W. Martin Jr. (MA 14)	199	46.49
—	Present	2	0.47
Total votes		428	100
Votes necessary		215	>50

== Sources ==
- "Congressional Record (Bound Edition)". govinfo.gov. Washington, D.C.: United States Government Publishing Office.
- Heitshusen, Valerie (September 14, 2023). Speakers of the House: Elections, 1913–2023 (Report). Congressional Research Service.
