= Bernard Gehrmann =

Bernard Gehrmann may refer to:

- Bernard J. Gehrmann, U.S. Representative from Wisconsin
- Bernard E. Gehrmann, member of the Wisconsin State Assembly
