= Ernest A. Heden =

American politician

Ernest A. Heden (February 12, 1888 – 1962), was a member of the Wisconsin State Assembly and Wisconsin State Senate. Heden was Lutheran.

== Background ==
Born on Ogema, Wisconsin, Heden graduated from Gustavus Adolphus College. He was in the banking and logging business. His father was August Heden who also served in the Wisconsin Legislature.

== Career ==
In 1934, Heden was a candidate in the Republican primary for the United States House of Representatives from Wisconsin's 10th congressional district. He lost to incumbent Hubert H. Peavey, who then lost to Bernard J. Gehrmann in the general election. From 1939 to 1943, he was a member of the Assembly. He was later a delegate to the Republican National Convention in 1940 and 1944 before serving in the Senate from 1945 to 1947.
