= Wisconsin's 11th congressional district =

Coordinates: 46°10′N 91°35′W

- Obsolete district
- Created: 1900
- Eliminated: 1930
- Years active: 1903-1933

Wisconsin's 11th congressional district is a former congressional district of the United States House of Representatives in Wisconsin. It was created following the 1900 census, and was disbanded after the 1930 census. The district covered the far northern part of the state during its time of existence. All representatives who were ever elected to the seat were members of the Republican Party.

== List of members representing the district ==
Member	Party	Years	Cong ress	Electoral history	Map
District established March 4, 1903
John J. Jenkins (Chippewa Falls)	Republican	March 4, 1903 – March 3, 1909	58th 59th 60th	Redistricted from the 10th district and re-elected in 1902. Re-elected in 1904. Re-elected in 1906. Lost renomination.	1903–1913
Irvine Lenroot (Superior)	Republican	March 4, 1909 – April 17, 1918	61st 62nd 63rd 64th 65th	Elected in 1908. Re-elected in 1910. Re-elected in 1912. Re-elected in 1914. Re-elected in 1916. Resigned when elected U.S. senator.	1903–1913
Irvine Lenroot (Superior)	Republican	March 4, 1909 – April 17, 1918	61st 62nd 63rd 64th 65th	Elected in 1908. Re-elected in 1910. Re-elected in 1912. Re-elected in 1914. Re-elected in 1916. Resigned when elected U.S. senator.	1913–1933
Vacant		April 17, 1918 – November 5, 1918	65th		1913–1933
Adolphus P. Nelson (Grantsburg)	Republican	November 5, 1918 – March 3, 1923	65th 66th 67th	Elected to finish Lenroot's term. Also elected in 1918 to the next term. Re-elected in 1920. Lost re-election.	1913–1933
Hubert H. Peavey (Washburn)	Republican	March 4, 1923 – March 3, 1933	68th 69th 70th 71st 72nd	Elected in 1922. Re-elected in 1924. Re-elected in 1926. Re-elected in 1928. Re-elected in 1930. Redistricted to the 10th district.	1913–1933
District dissolved March 3, 1933
