= Mathiowetz =

Mathiowetz is a surname. Notable people with the surname include:

- Bernard F. Mathiowetz (1902–1997), American politician
- Nancy Mathiowetz, American sociologist and statistician
