= Ogema, Wisconsin =

- Town
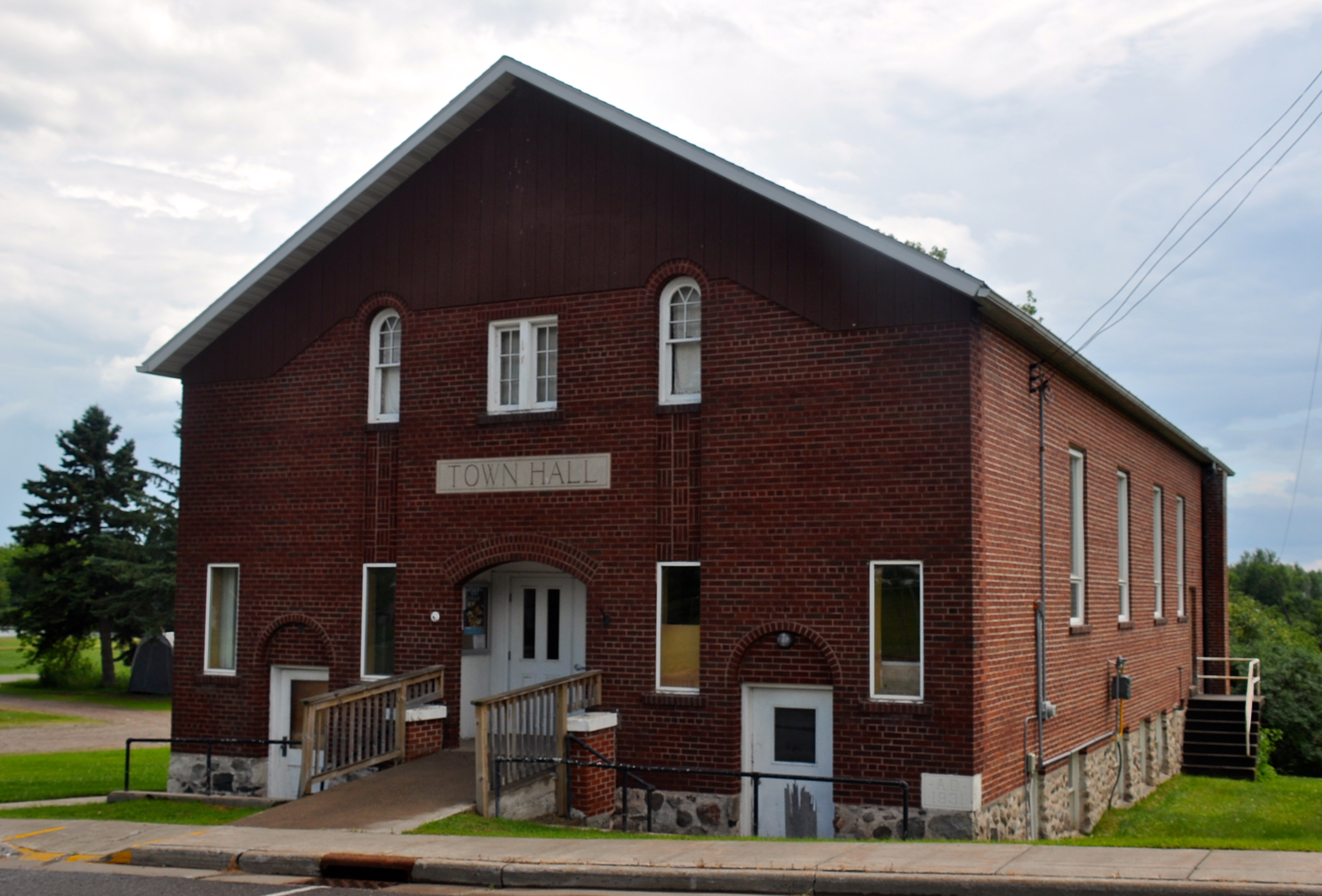
- Ogema Town Hall, July 2014

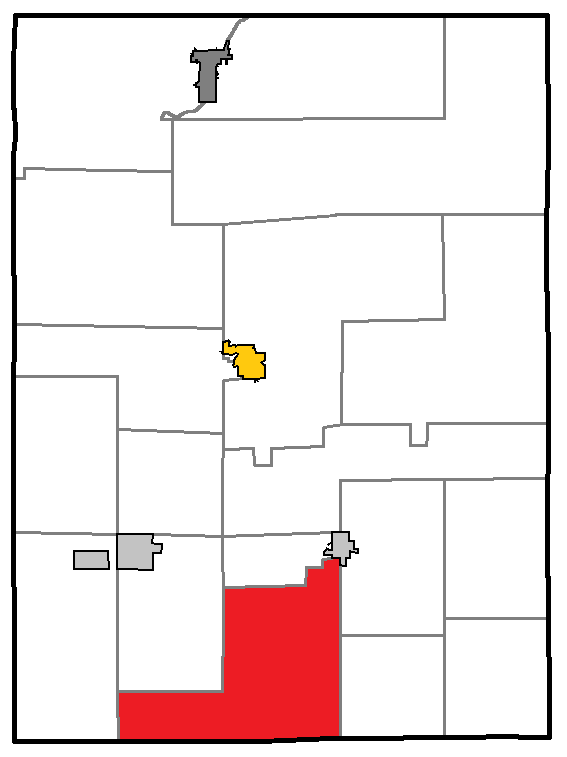
- Location of Ogema, within Price County
- Coordinates: 45°26′50″N 90°20′52″W
- Country: United States
- State: Wisconsin
- County: Price

Area
  - Total: 81.4 sq mi (210.8 km^{2})
  - Land: 81.3 sq mi (210.6 km^{2})
  - Water: 0.077 sq mi (0.2 km^{2})
- Elevation: 1,480 ft (451 m)

Population (2020)
  - Total: 727
  - Density: 8.94/sq mi (3.45/km^{2})
- Time zone: UTC-6 (Central (CST))
  - Summer (DST): UTC-5 (CDT)
- Area codes: 715 & 534
- FIPS code: 55-59525
- GNIS feature ID: 1583855
- Website: https://www.ogemawisconsin.com/

Ogema is a town in Price County, Wisconsin, United States. The population was 727 at the 2020 census. The unincorporated community of Ogema is located in the town.

== Geography ==
According to the United States Census Bureau, the town has a total area of 81.4 square miles (210.8 km^{2}), of which 81.3 square miles (210.6 km^{2}) is land and 0.1 square miles (0.2 km^{2}) (0.09%) is water.

Timms Hill, the highest geographic point in the state of Wisconsin (1,951.5 feet), is located just outside Ogema.

== Demographics ==
As of the census of 2000, there were 882 people, 349 households, and 255 families residing in the town. The population density was 10.8 people per square mile (4.2/km^{2}). There were 417 housing units at an average density of 5.1 per square mile (2.0/km^{2}). The racial makeup of the town was 99.21% White, 0.34% Native American, and 0.45% from two or more races.

There were 349 households, out of which 32.7% had children under the age of 18 living with them, 59.9% were married couples living together, 8.3% had a female householder with no husband present, and 26.9% were non-families. 21.8% of all households were made up of individuals, and 12.6% had someone living alone who was 65 years of age or older. The average household size was 2.53 and the average family size was 2.95.

In the town, the population was spread out, with 26.8% under the age of 18, 8.2% from 18 to 24, 24.9% from 25 to 44, 23.1% from 45 to 64, and 17.0% who were 65 years of age or older. The median age was 39 years. For every 100 females, there were 99.5 males. For every 100 females age 18 and over, there were 100.0 males.

The median income for a household in the town was $29,545, and the median income for a family was $31,625. Males had a median income of $30,125 versus $20,469 for females. The per capita income for the town was $13,664. About 12.6% of families and 14.6% of the population were below the poverty line, including 21.8% of those under age 18 and 12.4% of those age 65 or over.

== Notable people ==
- August Heden, politician
- Ernest A. Heden, politician
- L. S. Shauger, politician
- Pep Simek, businessman, co-founder of Tombstone pizza
