= L. S. Shauger =

American politician

L. S. Shauger was a member of the Wisconsin State Assembly during the 1929 and 1931 sessions. Additionally, he was Chairman (similar to Mayor) of Ogema, Wisconsin and County Chairman of Price County, Wisconsin. He was a Republican. Shauger was born in Outagamie County, Wisconsin in 1878.
