= East Third Street Residential Historic District =

Historic building in Washburn, Wisconsin

- U.S. National Register of Historic Places
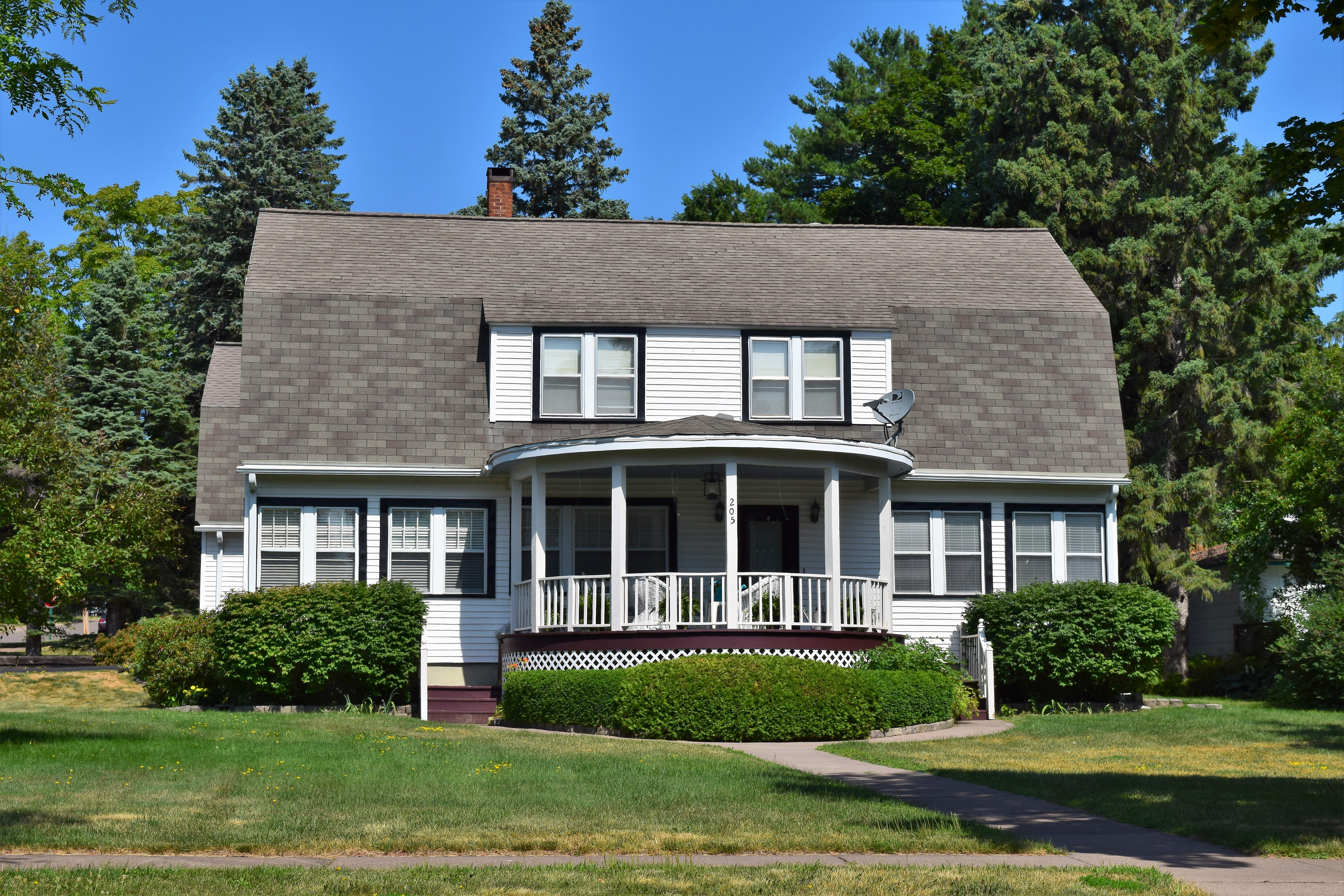
- A house located within the district.
- Location: E. 3rd St. from Central Ave. to 4th Ave. E. Washburn, Wisconsin
- NRHP reference No.: 14000430
- Added to NRHP: July 18, 2014

The East Third District Residential Historic District is located in Washburn, Wisconsin. It comprises 31 contributing homes built from 1885 through 1950 including Colonial Revival style, Queen Anne, Prairie School, and American Craftsman.

== History ==
Several houses in the district were constructed by DuPont for employees of a nearby plant of theirs in Barksdale, Wisconsin. Other structures in the district include a house originally built by the United States Forest Service to be used by the resident forest ranger for Chequamegon-Nicolet National Forest.

The district was added to the State Register of Historic Places in 2013 and to the National Register of Historic Places the following year.
