= John C. Chapple =

American politician (1875–1946)

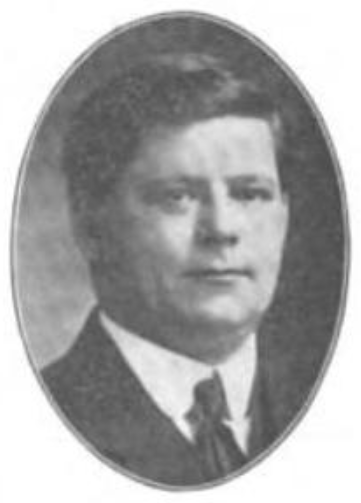

Member of the Wisconsin State Assembly from the Ashland County district
- In office January 4, 1943 – May 1, 1946
- Preceded by: Harry P. Van Guilder
- Succeeded by: Bernard J. Gehrmann
- In office January 1, 1917 – January 3, 1921
- Preceded by: Charles Kleinsteiber
- Succeeded by: Abe L. Biglow
- In office January 4, 1909 – January 2, 1911
- Preceded by: Ove H. Berg
- Succeeded by: Ove H. Berg

Personal details
- Born: John Crockett Chapple; May 27, 1875 La Porte City, Iowa
- Died: May 1, 1946 (aged 70) Ashland, Wisconsin
- Party: Republican
- Education: Northland Academy; Cornell College
- Occupation: Newspaper editor, politician

John Crockett Chapple (May 27, 1875 – May 1, 1946) was an American newspaper editor and politician.

Born in La Porte City, Iowa, Chapple went to Northland Academy (now Northland College) in Ashland, Wisconsin and Cornell College in Mt. Vernon, Iowa. He was the editor of the Ashland Daily Press and was also a columnist and printer. Chapple served on the Ashland Common Council, the Ashland County, Wisconsin Board of Superviors, and was a Republican. He was also the postmaster. Chapple served in the Wisconsin State Assembly in 1909, 1917, and 1919. He was also elected in 1942 and 1944. Chapple died in Ashland, Wisconsin while still in office in 1946.
