= Irvine Lenroot =

American politician and jurist (1869–1949)

The Honorable Irvine Lenroot
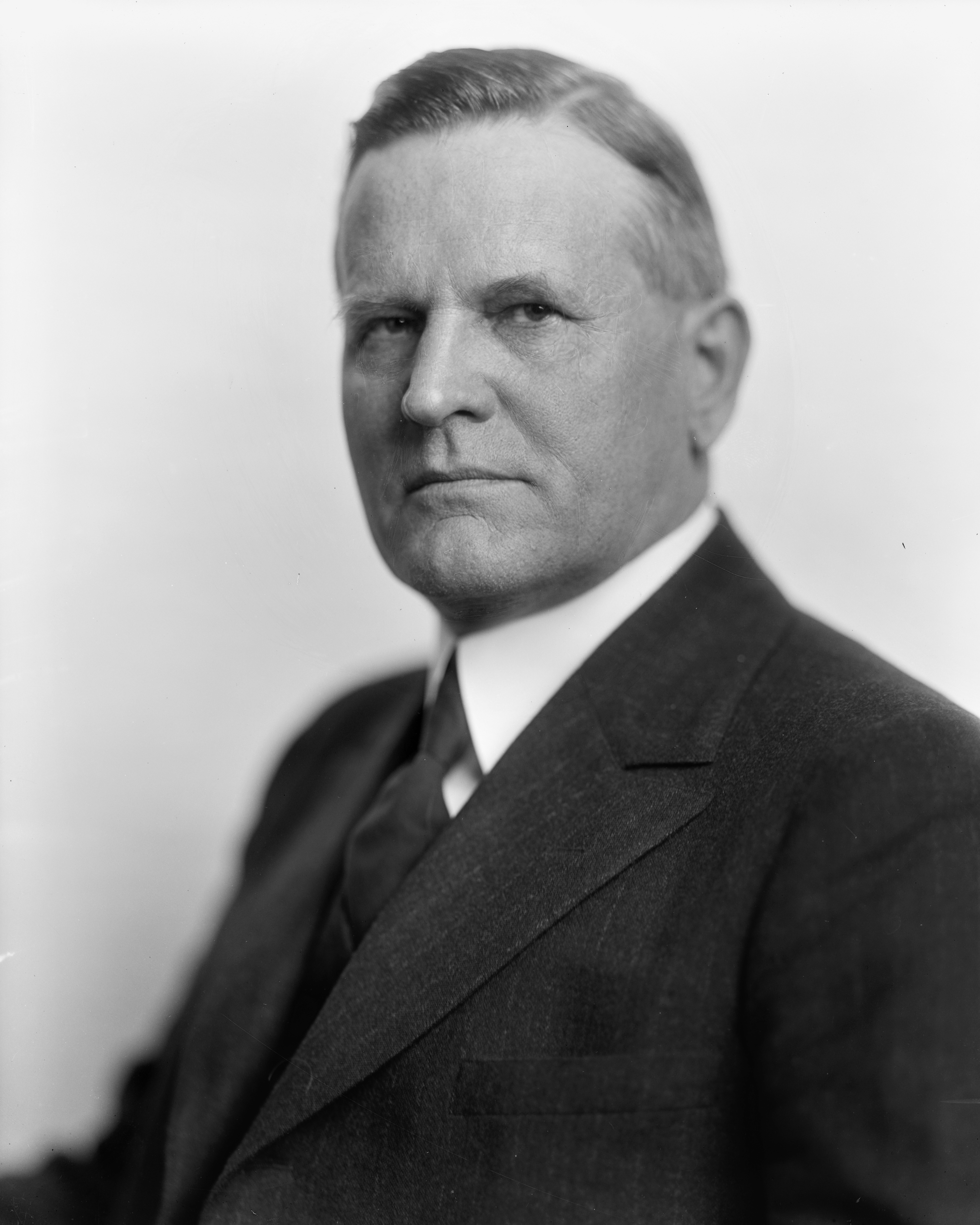
- Lenroot c. 1920s

Associate Judge of the United States Court of Customs and Patent Appeals
- In office May 17, 1929 – April 30, 1944
- Nominated by: Herbert Hoover
- Preceded by: Orion M. Barber
- Succeeded by: Ambrose O'Connell

United States Senator from Wisconsin
- In office April 18, 1918 – March 3, 1927
- Preceded by: Paul O. Husting
- Succeeded by: John J. Blaine

Member of the U.S. House of Representatives from Wisconsin's 11th district
- In office March 4, 1909 – April 17, 1918
- Preceded by: John J. Jenkins
- Succeeded by: Adolphus Peter Nelson

41st Speaker of the Wisconsin State Assembly
- In office January 14, 1903 – January 7, 1907
- Preceded by: George H. Ray
- Succeeded by: Herman Ekern

Personal details
- Born: Irvine Luther Lenroot; January 31, 1869 Superior, Wisconsin, U.S.
- Died: January 26, 1949 (aged 79) Washington, D.C., U.S.
- Resting place: Greenwood Cemetery; Superior, Wisconsin
- Party: Republican
- Education: Parsons Business College read law

Irvine Luther Lenroot (January 31, 1869 – January 26, 1949) was an American attorney, jurist, and Republican Party politician from Wisconsin. He served as Speaker of the Wisconsin State Assembly from 1903 to 1907 and represented the state in the United States Congress from 1909 to 1927, first in the United States House of Representatives until 1918, and then in the United States Senate. After he lost the Republican nomination in 1926, Herbert Hoover nominated him to the United States Court of Customs and Patent Appeals.

== Education and career ==
Born on January 31, 1869, in Superior, Wisconsin, Lenroot attended the common schools, then attended Parsons Business College in Duluth, Minnesota and read law in 1897. He was a logger and reporter for the Douglas County, Wisconsin Superior Court from 1893 to 1906. He was admitted to the bar and entered private practice in Superior in 1898. He was a member of the Wisconsin State Assembly from 1901 to 1907, serving as Speaker from 1903 to 1907.

== Congressional service ==
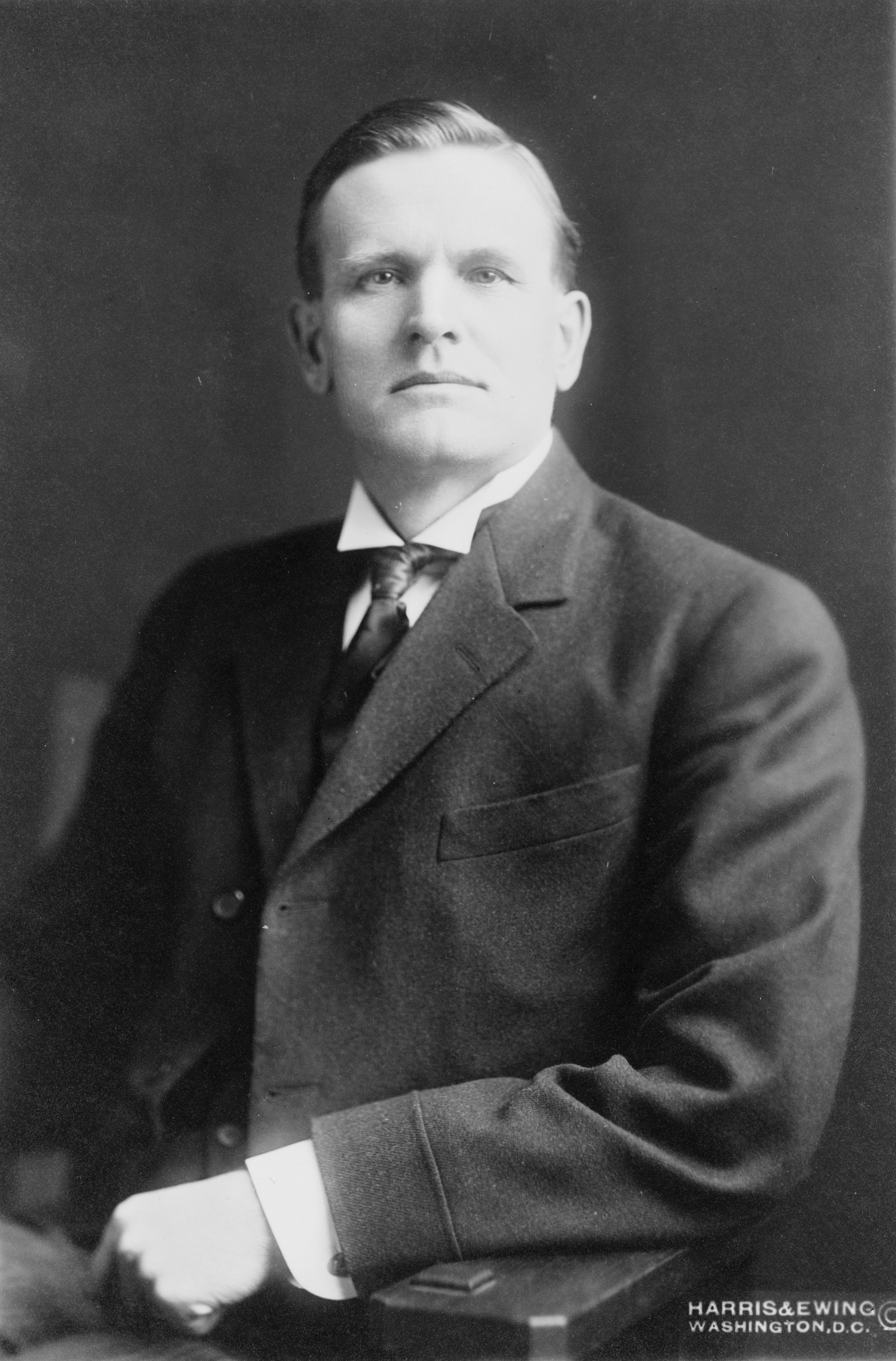
Lenroot, c. 1912

Lenroot was elected as a Republican from the 11th congressional district to the United States House of Representatives of the 61st United States Congress and to the four succeeding Congresses and served from March 4, 1909, until April 17, 1918, when he resigned, having been elected Senator. He was elected as a Republican to the United States Senate on April 2, 1918, to fill the vacancy caused by the death of United States Senator Paul O. Husting. He was reelected in 1920 and served from April 18, 1918, to March 3, 1927. He was an unsuccessful candidate for renomination in 1926. He was Chairman of the Committee on Railroads in the 66th United States Congress, Committee on Public Lands and Surveys in the 68th United States Congress and the Committee on Public Buildings and Grounds in the 69th United States Congress. He resumed the practice of law in Washington, D.C. from 1927 to 1929.

== 1920 Republican Convention ==
Lenroot attended the 1920 Republican National Convention at the Chicago Coliseum, and after the selection of Warren G. Harding of Ohio as the nominee for president, party leaders decided that the progressive Lenroot would be a balance to a ticket with the more conservative Harding. By Saturday night, June 12, many of the delegates had gone home, along with most of the party bosses. After Lenroot's name had been placed in nomination and seconded but before a vote could be taken, an Oregon delegate, Wallace McCamant, nominated Calvin Coolidge of Massachusetts for vice president. Unfettered by party bosses, the delegates weighed in for Coolidge, who received 674 votes to Lenroot's 146 and won on the first ballot.

== Federal judicial service ==
Lenroot was nominated by President Herbert Hoover on April 22, 1929, to an Associate Judge seat on the United States Court of Customs and Patent Appeals vacated by Associate Judge Orion M. Barber. He was confirmed by the United States Senate on May 17, 1929, and received his commission the same day. His service terminated on April 30, 1944, due to his retirement. He died on January 26, 1949, in Washington, D.C. He was interred in Greenwood Cemetery in Superior. The Associated Press report of his death began, "Former Senator Irvine L. Lenroot of Wisconsin, the man who might have been the 30th President of the United States, died Wednesday night."

== Personal life ==
Lenroot married Clara Clough of Superior, who wrote a short memoir of her girlhood in Wisconsin in the 1860s and 1870s. His daughter, Katherine Lenroot, was known for successfully lobbying for the Fair Labor Standards Act and the enforcing of child labor laws.

Lenroot was born to Lars Lönnrot (Lenroot), a Swedish immigrant and farmer for whom Lenroot's Addition in the Smithville area of Duluth, Minnesota, is named.

Wisconsin State Assembly
Preceded by George H. Ray	Speaker of the Wisconsin State Assembly; January 14, 1903 – January 7, 1907	Succeeded by Herman Ekern
U.S. House of Representatives
Preceded by John J. Jenkins	United States Representative from Wisconsin's 11th congressional district 1909–1918	Succeeded by Adolphus Peter Nelson
Party political offices
Preceded by Francis E. McGovern	Republican nominee for United States Senator from Wisconsin (Class 3); 1918, 1920	Succeeded by John J. Blaine
U.S. Senate
Preceded by Paul O. Husting	United States Senator (Class 3) from Wisconsin; 1918–1927; Served alongside: Robert M. La Follette, Robert M. La Follette Jr.	Succeeded by John J. Blaine
Preceded by Peter G. Gerry	Chairman of the United States Senate Committee on Railroads; 1919–1921	Office abolished
Legal offices
Preceded by Orion M. Barber	Associate Judge of the United States Court of Customs and Patent Appeals; 1929–1944	Succeeded by Ambrose O'Connell
