= Walter A. Duffy =

20th century American politician

Commissioner of the Wisconsin Department of Agriculture
- In office March 24, 1927 – September 16, 1929
- Governor: Fred R. Zimmerman
- Preceded by: John D. Jones Jr.
- Succeeded by: O. J. Thompson (as Secretary of Agriculture and Markets)

Member of the Wisconsin State Assembly from the Bayfield County district
- In office January 4, 1915 – January 6, 1919
- Preceded by: Hubert H. Peavey
- Succeeded by: Frank W. Downs

Personal details
- Born: June 17, 1889 Washburn, Wisconsin, U.S.
- Died: August 11, 1961 (aged 72) Portland, Oregon, U.S.
- Resting place: River View Cemetery, Portland
- Party: Republican
- Spouse: Bertha M. Roll (died 1988)
- Children: 2
- Education: University of Wisconsin–Madison
- Occupation: Farmer, government administrator

Walter Aloysies Duffy (June 17, 1889 – August 11, 1961) was an American farmer, government administrator, and Republican politician. He was a member of the Wisconsin State Assembly, representing Bayfield County during the 1915 and 1917 sessions, and was commissioner of the Wisconsin Department of Agriculture during the administration of Governor Fred R. Zimmerman. He later served as a regional director of the Farm Security Administration for the northwestern states, and was state director of the Farmers Home Administration in Portland, Oregon, near the end of his life.

== Biography ==
Walter A. Duffy was born in Washburn, Wisconsin, in 1889. He received his education at the common schools in Washburn, then taught school in the county for four years. In 1911 he established a farm and was a member of the county board of supervisors.

He ran for Wisconsin State Assembly in 1914, seeking the Republican Party nomination in the heavily Republican district. He defeated former state representative Lorenzo Clausen in the Republican primary and went on to win the general election. His district comprised all of Bayfield County. He was re-elected in 1916, but was defeated in the Republican primary in 1918, when he was seeking a third term.

After leaving office, Duffy attended the University of Wisconsin–Madison, graduating in 1920. He was then appointed a state agriculture agent for Barron and Rusk counties, and was then appointed the commissioner of the Wisconsin Department of Agriculture in 1927, under Governor Fred R. Zimmerman. In 1929, the Department of Agriculture was transformed into the Department of Agriculture and Markets, overseen by a new board of commissioners. Duffy's position was abolished during the transition in 1929. He was subsequently appointed to serve again as a state agriculture agent, this time serving several years in Douglas County.

In 1936, he received a federal appointment as regional director of the Resettlement Administration, and moved to Portland, Oregon. His region comprised Oregon, Washington, Idaho, and Alaska. In 1937, the Resettlement Administration became the Farm Security Administration, and Duffy continued in his role as regional director until 1946, when the Farm Security Administration was replaced by the Farmers Home Administration. At that time, Duffy was appointed state director of the Farmers Home Administration for Oregon. He served another 8 years in that role, retiring finally in 1954.

He took one further government job, acting part time as an agriculture agent in Fairbanks, Alaska, during 1955 and 1956. He ultimately retired to Portland, where he died in August 1961.

== Personal life and family ==
Walter Duffy married Bertha M. Roll of Terre Haute, Indiana, in 1919. They met while Duffy was a member of the Assembly and Bertha was an employee in the state legislative reference library. Duffy was survived by his wife and two adult children.

== Electoral history ==
=== Wisconsin Assembly (1914, 1916, 1918) ===
Year	Election	Date	Elected				Defeated				Total	Plurality
1914	Primary	Sep. 1	Walter A. Duffy	Republican	411	53.03%	Lorenzo Clausen	Rep.	364	46.97%	775	47
1914	General	Nov. 3	Walter A. Duffy	Republican	925	57.28%	Winfield E. Tripp	Dem.	367	22.72%	1,615	558
1914	General	Nov. 3	Walter A. Duffy	Republican	925	57.28%	James N. Kinney	Soc.D.	323	20.00%	1,615	558
1916	Primary	Sep. 5	Walter A. Duffy (inc)	Republican			Gilbert W. Deniston	Rep.				~140
1916	General	Nov. 7	Walter A. Duffy (inc)	Republican	1,628	76.83%	John L. Tarrow	Dem.	490	23.12%	2,119	1,138
1918	Primary	Sep. 3	Frank W. Downs	Republican	599	56.14%	Walter A. Duffy (inc)	Rep.	468	43.86%	1,067	131

Wisconsin State Assembly
Preceded by Hubert H. Peavey	Member of the Wisconsin State Assembly from the Bayfield County district January 4, 1915 – January 6, 1919	Succeeded by Frank W. Downs
Government offices
Preceded by John D. Jones Jr.	Commissioner of the Wisconsin Department of Agriculture; March 24, 1927 – September 16, 1929	Succeeded by O. J. Thompson (as Secretary of Agriculture and Markets)
