= Adolphus Peter Nelson =

American politician (1872–1927)

Adolphus P. Nelson
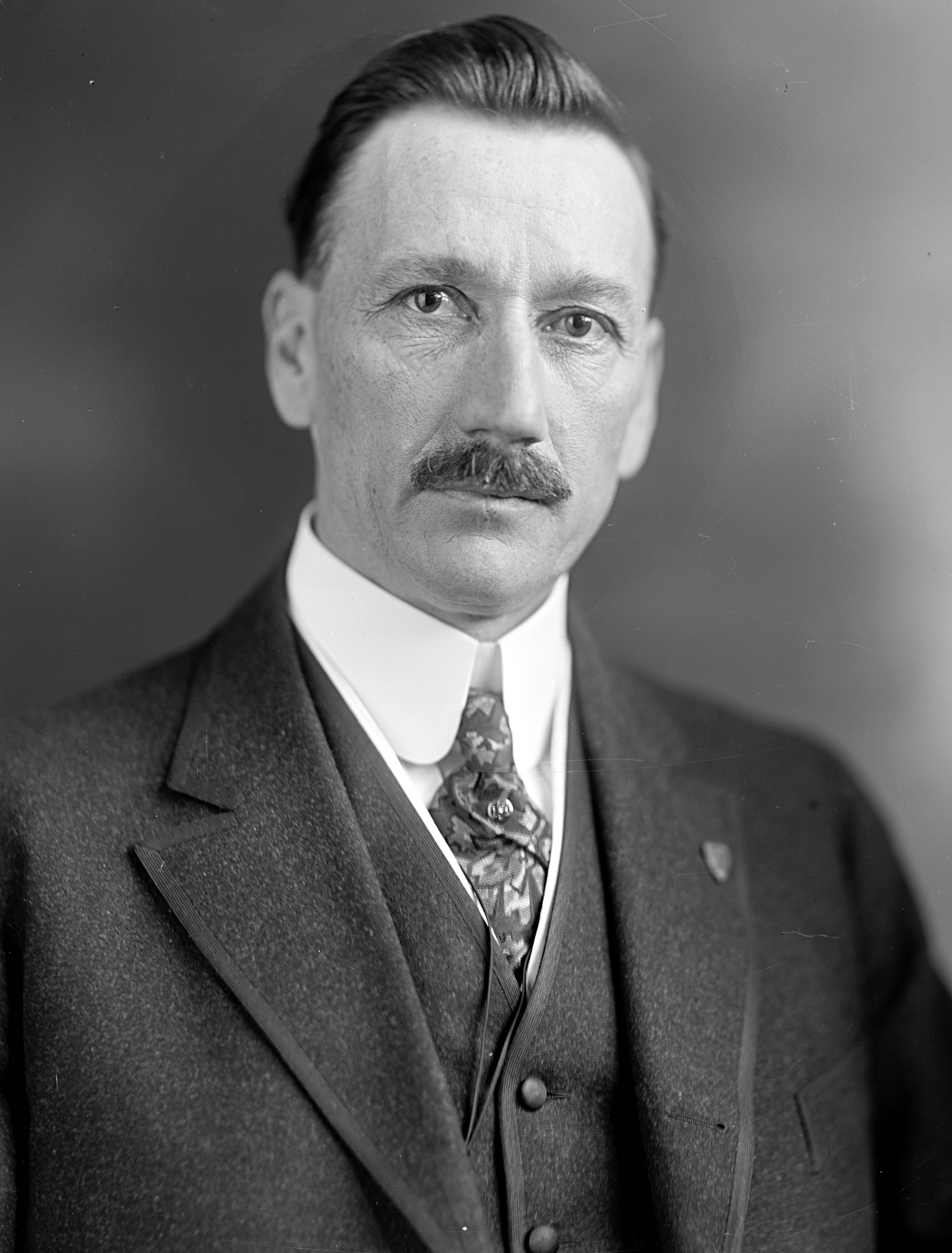

Member of the U.S. House of Representatives from Wisconsin's 11th district
- In office November 5, 1918 – March 3, 1923
- Preceded by: Irvine L. Lenroot
- Succeeded by: Hubert H. Peavey

Personal details
- Born: March 28, 1872 Holmes City Township, Minnesota, U.S.
- Died: August 21, 1927 (aged 55) Grantsburg, Wisconsin, U.S.
- Party: Republican

Adolphus Peter Nelson (March 28, 1872 – August 21, 1927) was a U.S. representative from Wisconsin.

Born in Holmes City Township, Minnesota, Nelson attended the public schools there. He graduated from Hamline University in St. Paul, Minnesota, in 1897, and then moved to Grantsburg, Wisconsin, where he worked in banking.

Nelson became a regent of the University of Wisconsin in 1906, continuing until 1919. From 1916 to 1920 he served as President of the Board of Regents. He was also president of the local school board from 1910 to 1916, mayor of Grantsburg from 1914 to 1916, and vice president of the Board of Trustees of Hamline University from 1914 to 1918. He served as mayor of Grantsburg between 1914 and 1916.

Nelson was first elected to the 65th Congress as a Republican to fill the vacancy caused by the resignation of Irvine L. Lenroot, who resigned after being elected to the U.S. Senate. He was subsequently re-elected twice, serving from November 5, 1918, to March 3, 1923. He was an unsuccessful candidate for re-election in 1922. Following his terms in Congress, he returned to work in banking in Grantsburg, where he died and was buried in Riverside Cemetery.

U.S. House of Representatives
| Preceded by Irvine L. Lenroot | Member of the U.S. House of Representatives from Wisconsin's 11th congressional district November 5, 1918 – March 3, 1923 | Succeeded by Hubert H. Peavey |
