= August Heden =

American politician

August Heden (May 21, 1856 – February 3, 1946) was an American lumberman and politician.

Born in Dalsland, Sweden, Heden emigrated to the United States in 1880 and settle in Pennsylvania and then the Upper Peninsula of Michigan. In 1882, Heden moved to the town of Ogema, Price County, Wisconsin and was involved in the lumber industry. He also owned a farm and a general store. Heden served on the Ogema Town Board and was town assessor; he was also a jury commissioner. In 1913 and 1915, Heden served in the Wisconsin State Assembly and was a Republican. Heden died in Ogema, Wisconsin. His son, Ernest A. Heden, also served in the Wisconsin Legislature.
