= Arthur William McLeod =

American politician

Arthur William McLeod was a member of the Wisconsin State Assembly.

== Biography ==
McLeod was born on September 26, 1872, in Alpena, Michigan. He moved to Eagle River, Wisconsin in 1888. In 1894, he graduated from the University of Wisconsin Law School and settled in Washburn, Wisconsin.

== Career ==
McLeod was a member of the Assembly in 1899. Previously, he had been City Attorney of Washburn from 1895 to 1896 and District Attorney of Bayfield County, Wisconsin from 1897 to 1898. He was a Republican.
