= Alvin O'Konski =

American politician and educator (1904–1987)

Alvin E. O'Konski
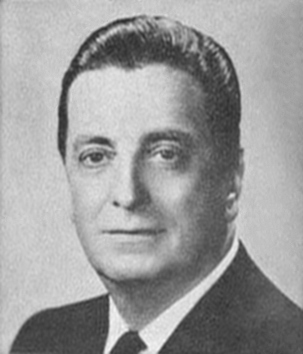
- Alvin E. O'Konski, U.S. Congressman

Member of the U.S. House of Representatives from Wisconsin's 10th district
- In office January 3, 1943 – January 3, 1973
- Preceded by: Bernard J. Gehrmann
- Succeeded by: District abolished

Personal details
- Born: Alvin Edward O'Konski; May 26, 1904 Kewaunee, Wisconsin
- Died: July 8, 1987 (aged 83) Kewaunee, Wisconsin
- Resting place: Saint Hedwig's Cemetery; Kewaunee, Wisconsin
- Party: Republican
- Spouse: Veronica M. Hemming (died 1998)

Alvin Edward O'Konski (May 26, 1904 – July 8, 1987) was an American politician and educator who served 30 years in the United States House of Representatives. A Republican, he represented northwestern Wisconsin from 1943 until 1973.

== Early life and education ==
O'Konski was born on a farm near Kewaunee, Wisconsin to Antonia (née Paska) and Frank O'Konski, on May 26, 1904. He attended the local public schools and the University of Iowa. He graduated from State Teachers College (now University of Wisconsin–Oshkosh) in Oshkosh, Wisconsin in 1927, and from the University of Wisconsin (now University of Wisconsin–Madison) in 1932.

== Career ==
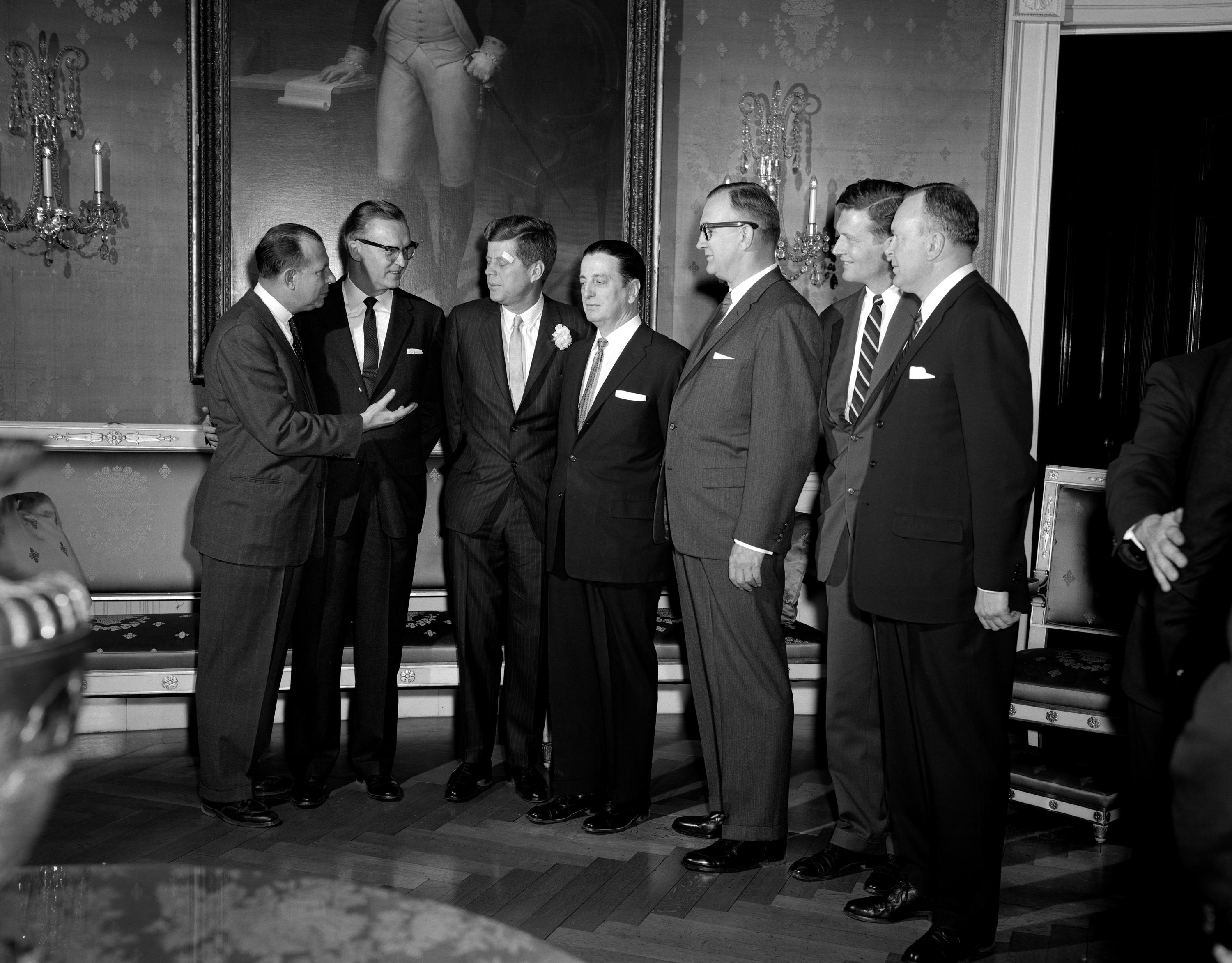
John A. Blatnik; President John F. Kennedy; Alvin E. O’Konski; John P. Saylor; John V. Lindsay. Blue Room, White House

He was a high school teacher in Omro and Oconto from 1926 to 1929, a member of the faculty of Oregon State College at Corvallis, Oregon, from 1929 to 1931, and a faculty member at the University of Detroit from 1936 to 1938. He was superintendent of schools in Pulaski, Wisconsin, from 1932 to 1935 and an instructor at a junior college in Coleraine, Minnesota, in 1936. He was an educator, journalist, lecturer, editor and publisher at Hurley, Wisconsin, from 1940 to 1942.

In 1942, O'Konski was elected as a Republican to the 78th United States Congress. He was then reelected to the fourteen succeeding Congresses serving from January 3, 1943, till January 3, 1973. While in congress, he represented Wisconsin's 10th congressional district. In 1957, he was an unsuccessful candidate in the Republican primary in the special election to replace United States Senator Joseph McCarthy, who had died in office. O'Konski voted in favor of the Civil Rights Acts of 1957, 1960, 1964, and 1968, as well as the 24th Amendment to the U.S. Constitution and the Voting Rights Act of 1965. O’Konski voted for several other progressive measures during the course of his Congressional career such as those related to healthcare, poverty reduction, and minimum wage increases.

O'Konski represented a district that included much of the northwestern part of the state, including Rhinelander and Superior. However, after the 1970 census, Wisconsin lost a district, and most of O'Konski's territory was merged with Wisconsin's 7th congressional district represented by three-term Democratic Party member Dave Obey. O'Konski retained only about 40 percent of his former territory, a disadvantage he was unable to overcome despite his seniority. Even though Richard Nixon carried most of the district in the 1972 election, O'Konski was defeated. A proposed navy project called Project Sanguine which O'Konski supported may have been a factor in his loss.

While still serving in Congress, O'Konski founded WAEO-TV, the NBC affiliate for most of north-central Wisconsin. He sold the station in 1976; it is now WJFW-TV.

== Personal life ==
O'Konski lived in Kewaunee, Wisconsin, until his death in 1987. He is buried at St. Hedwig's Cemetery, a rural church cemetery west of Kewaunee.

U.S. House of Representatives
Preceded by Bernard J. Gehrmann	Member of the U.S. House of Representatives from Wisconsin's 10th congressional district January 3, 1943 – January 3, 1973	District abolished
