= Paul Samuel Reinsch =

American political scientist and diplomat (1869–1923)

Paul S. Reinsch
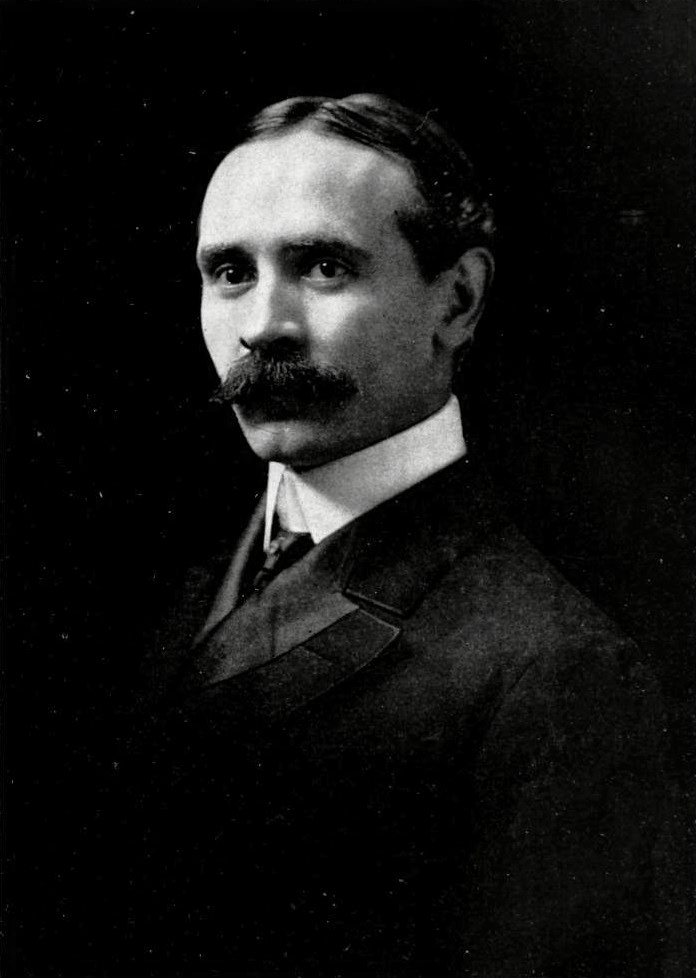
- Portrait of Paul Samuel Reinsch.
- Born: June 10, 1869; Milwaukee, Wisconsin, U.S.
- Died: January 26, 1923 (aged 53); Shanghai, China
- Education: University of Wisconsin–Madison
- Scientific career
- Fields: Political science
- Doctoral advisor: Frederick Jackson Turner

Paul Samuel Reinsch (June 10, 1869 – January 26, 1923), was an American political scientist and diplomat. He played an influential role in developing the field of international relations. He helped form the American Political Science Association and the American Society of International Law.

He was a strong proponent of the Open Door Policy (a system of equal trade and investment and to guarantee the territorial integrity of Qing China) and a critic of imperialism.

== Early life ==
Reinsch was born in Milwaukee, Wisconsin, of German-American parents. He graduated from the University of Wisconsin in 1892, attended the school of law there, and after graduating in 1894, was admitted to the bar and practiced law in Milwaukee for some time.

== Academic career ==
He returned to the University of Wisconsin for additional schooling in 1895, enrolled as a PhD student in history and political science. He earned a Ph.D. in political science under Frederick Jackson Turner in 1898. While Reinsch was at the University of Wisconsin, Richard Ely founded the School of Economics, Political Science and History. Reinsch was a progressive and his fellow student and friend Francis McGovern would go on to become Governor of Wisconsin and implement progressive policies.

He was assistant professor of political science from 1899 to 1901, and full professor from 1901 to 1913. He reportedly established the first course in international politics at the University of Wisconsin in 1899.

In 1900, Reinsch published World Politics at the End of the Nineteenth Century. The book, which focuses on great power disputes over China, German imperialism and American expansionism, has been characterized as an early writing within the field of political science that recognized that international politics were shaped by unique economic, political and intellectual forces. In the book, Reinsch identifies a shift from nationalism to national imperialism where the new desire of European nation-states is to control as much territory as possible.

Reinsch criticizes national imperialism on the basis of its threat to world peace, the subjugation of indigenous peoples and its diversion of focus from domestic reform. However, Reinsch was in favor of expansionism on the grounds of a "white man's burden," although he expressed skepticism that even well-intentioned colonial activities would have its intended effects. He writes,

Experience seems to show that even those institutions which are by us considered the very foundation of good government may have harmful results when introduced into another society. The most striking example of this is found in the experience of Great Britain in India...The system has in general had a most unfortunate effect upon the intelligent life of India, introducing elements entirely alien to Indian culture which have turned the mind of Indian educated men away from the development of their inherited philosophical and literary civilization.

According to Ido Oren, "Reinsch wrote so extensively on the subject matter in which he was implicated as a diplomat and adviser—international diplomacy, international organization, and imperialism—that it becomes nearly impossible to draw a neat line separating scholarship from politics in his career."

== Diplomatic career ==
Reinsch was part of the U.S. delegation to the third and fourth Pan-American conferences in 1906 and 1910, and the first Pan-American Scientific Congress in Santiago in 1909.

In 1913, President Woodrow Wilson appointed Reinsch United States Minister to China, a position he held until 1919 when he became legal advisor to the Chinese government. During his time in China, Reinsch was a strong proponent for greater US aid to China, increased Red Cross activities in China, and an alliance between the US and China in World War I.

Reinsch strongly opposed the Shandong Agreement of the Versailles Treaty, which granted Japan control over Shandong, a former German protectorate. He was a proponent of Chinese sovereignty. He resigned from his position as American minister to China in protest.

== Final years ==
He established a law firm in Washington D.C. in 1920. He ran as the Democratic candidate in the 1920 United States Senate election in Wisconsin, placing third with 13.18% of the vote.

He died in Shanghai in 1923 following complications from bronchial pneumonia.

== Publications ==
- (1899). The Common Law in the Early American Colonies.
- (1900). World Politics at the End of the Nineteenth Century.
- (1902). Colonial Government.
- (1905). Colonial Administration.
- (1907). American Legislatures and Legislative Methods.
- (1909). Readings on American Federal Government.
- (1909). Civil Government.
- (1911). Readings on American State Government.
- (1911). Intellectual and Political Currents in the Far East.
- (1911). Public International Unions.
- (1922). An American Diplomat in China.

=== Selected articles ===
- "A Parliament for China," The Atlantic, December 1, 1909.
- "Intellectual Life in Japan," The Atlantic, October 1910.

He was a contributor to the New International Encyclopedia.

== Notes ==
Party political offices
Preceded by Joseph E. Davies	Democratic nominee for U.S. Senator from Wisconsin (Class 3); 1920	Succeeded by Thomas M. Kearney
