= 1920 United States Senate election in Wisconsin =

- November 2, 1920
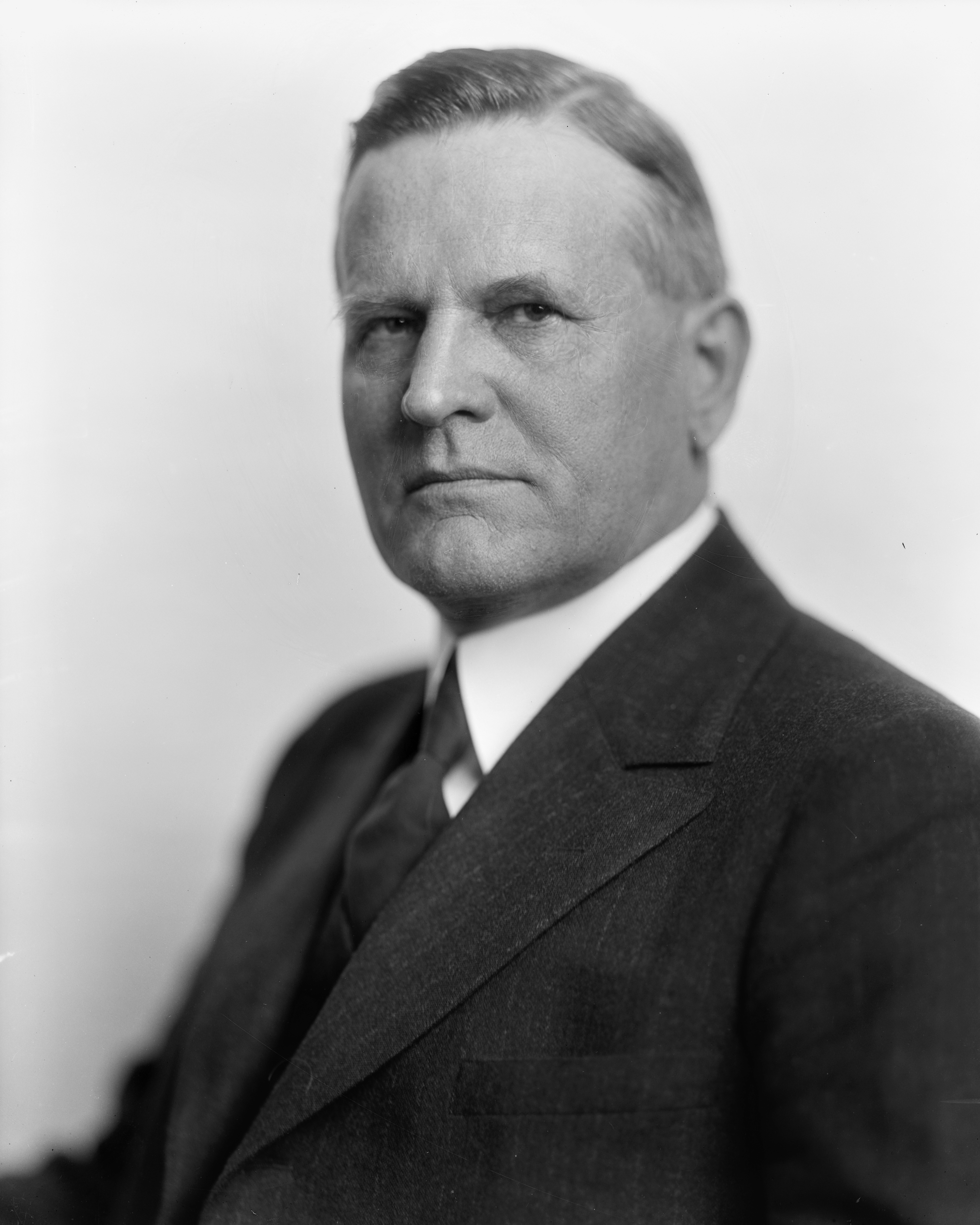

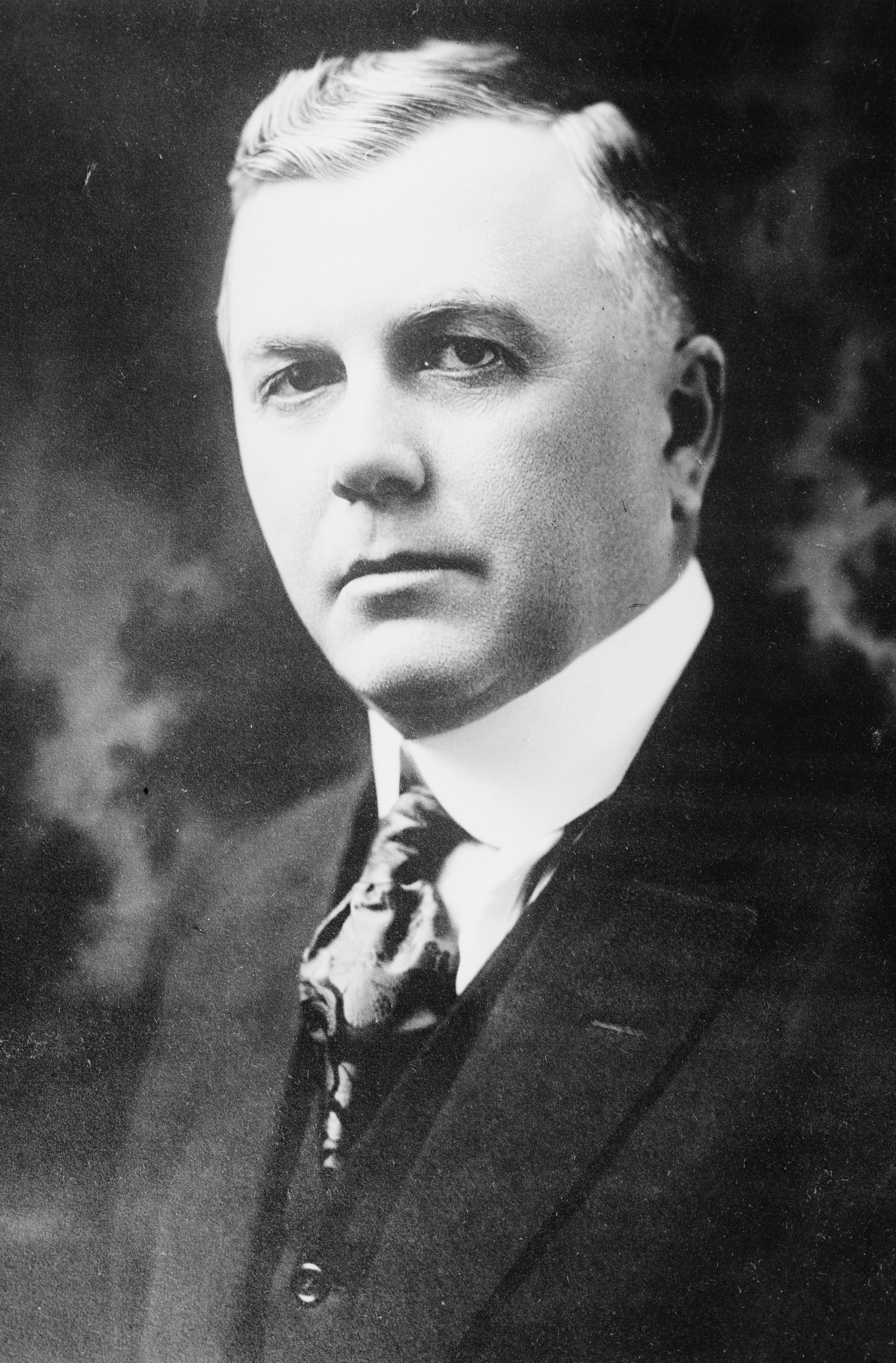

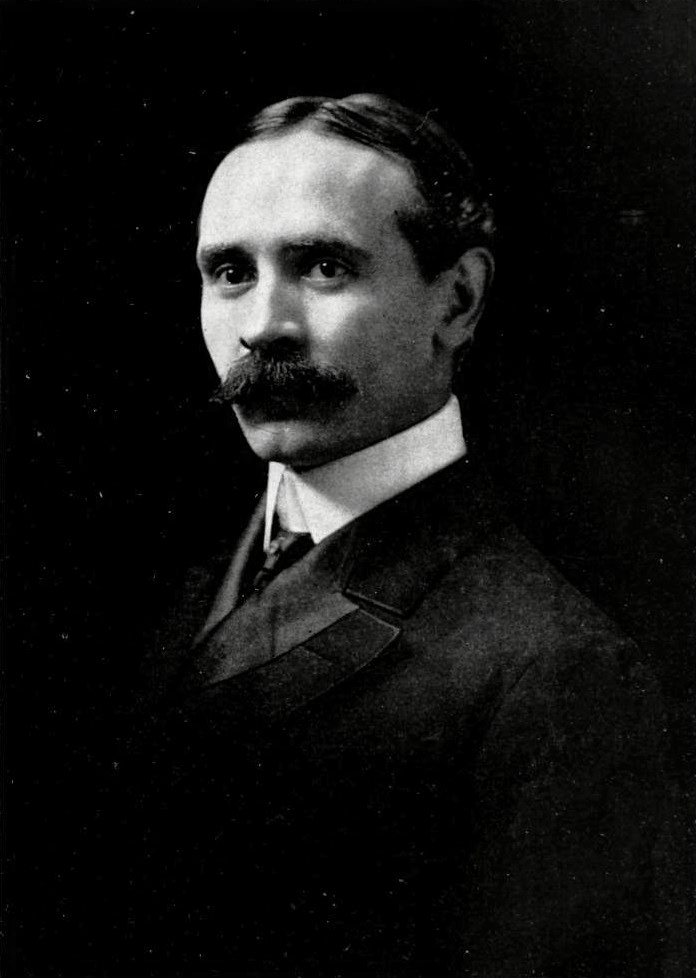

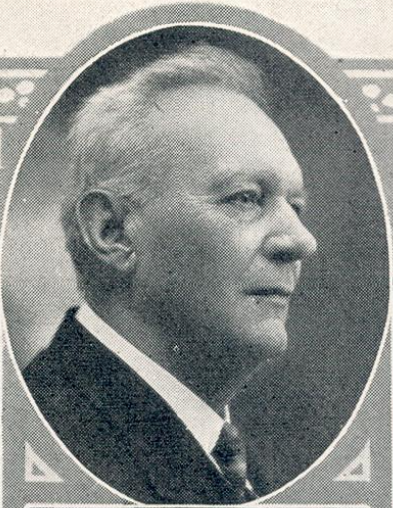
Nominee	Irvine Lenroot	James Thompson
Party	Republican	Independent Republican
Popular vote	281,576	235,029
Percentage	41.58%	34.71%
Nominee	Paul S. Reinsch	Frank J. Weber
Party	Democratic	Social-Democratic
Popular vote	89,265	66,172
Percentage	13.18%	9.77%
- County results Lenroot: 30–40% 40–50% 50–60% 60–70% 70–80% Thompson: 30–40% 40–50% 50–60% 60–70% Weber: 20–30%
U.S. senator before election
Irvine Lenroot
Republican
Elected U.S. Senator
Irvine Lenroot
Republican

The 1920 United States Senate election in Wisconsin was held on November 2, 1920. Incumbent senator Irvine Lenroot, who had been elected to complete the unexpired term of Paul O. Husting, was re-elected to a full term in office.

== Republican primary ==
=== Candidates ===
- Irvine Lenroot, incumbent Senator since 1918
- A.C. McHenry
- James Thompson, former La Crosse County district attorney

=== Results ===
1920 U.S. Senate Republican primary
Party	Candidate	Votes	%
Republican	Irvine Lenroot (incumbent)	169,296	46.92%
Republican	James Thompson	149,442	40.87%
Republican	A.C. McHenry	46,952	12.84%
Total votes		365,690	100.00%

== Other primaries ==
=== Democratic ===
1920 U.S. Senate Democratic primary
Party	Candidate	Votes	%
Democratic	Paul Samuel Reinsch	19,952	100.00%
Total votes		19,952	100.00%

=== Prohibition ===
1920 U.S. Senate Prohibition primary
Party	Candidate	Votes	%
Prohibition	Clyde D. Mead	1,194	50.79%
Prohibition	Buckman	1,157	49.21%
Total votes		2,351	100.00%

=== Social-Democratic ===
1920 U.S. Senate Social-Democratic primary
Party	Candidate	Votes	%
Social-Democratic	Frank J. Weber	32,275	100.00%
Total votes		32,275	100.00%

== General election ==
=== Candidates ===
- Irvine Lenroot, incumbent Senator (Republican)
- Clyde D. Mead (Prohibition)
- Paul Samuel Reinsch, diplomat and professor of political science at the University of Wisconsin (Democratic)
- James Thompson, former La Crosse County district attorney (La Follette Progressive)
- Frank J. Weber, former State Assemblyman from Milwaukee (Social-Democratic)

=== Results ===
1920 U.S. Senate election in Wisconsin
Party	Candidate	Votes	%	±%
Republican	Irvine Lenroot (incumbent)	281,576	41.58%	
Independent Republican	James Thompson	235,029	34.71%	
Democratic	Paul Samuel Reinsch	89,265	13.18%	
Social-Democratic	Frank J. Weber	66,172	9.77%	
Prohibition	Clyde D. Mead	5,107	0.75%	
Write-in		3	0.00%	
Total votes		545,638	100.00%	
Republican hold		Swing		

== See also ==
- 1920 United States Senate elections
