= Pep Simek =

American businessman (1926–2013)

Joseph "Pep" L. Simek
- A photo of Joseph "Pep" L. Simek as seen on his obituary page.
- Born: November 13, 1926; Ogema, Wisconsin, US
- Died: February 18, 2013 (aged 86); Milwaukee, Wisconsin, US
- Spouse: Frances L. Simek (m. 1947)
- Children: 3

Joseph "Pep" Simek Sr. (November 13, 1926 – February 18, 2013) was an American businessman who co-founded, along with his brother Ronald, a widely available American brand of frozen pizza, Tombstone Pizza.

== Biography ==
Simek was born to Josef and Vlasta (née Hrdlicka) Simek on November 13, 1926, in Ogema, Wisconsin, where he was also raised. His father was born in Lány (part of today's Litomyšl, Czech Republic) while his mother was born to ethnic Czech immigrants from Česká Třebová and Németpereg (today Peregu Mare, Romania). Simek served in the U.S. Army during World War II. He worked in a series of jobs and positions during the 1940s and 1950s.

In 1960, Simek and his wife, Frances Simek, moved from Chicago, Illinois, to Medford, Wisconsin. Pep Simek, and his brother, Ronald Simek, were the co-owners and bartenders of the Tombstone Tavern in Medford by 1962. The Tombstone Tavern was located adjacent to a cemetery, leading to the origin of its name. Pep and Ronald set up a side business making pizzas at the Tavern's tiny 6'X6' kitchen in the back of the bar to bring in extra income, effectively founding Tombstone Pizza with three other people, including Ron Simek, in 1962. Pep Simek tinkered with the recipe after breaking his leg, improving the taste of the pizzas in the process. Simek consulted with the owner of a pizza shop in Chicago, who advised him on the spices needed to flavor the Tombstone pizzas. The new pizzas proved popular. Within three years, Simek began selling them throughout Medford at the rate of 2,000 pizza pies per day. Pep Simek and his brother sold the pizzas utilizing the advertising tagline, "What do you want on your Tombstone?" Simek served as CEO and chairman of the board of directors of Tombstone pizza until the business was sold to Kraft Foods in 1986. Tombstone was later acquired by Nestlé in 2010.

Pep Simek opened a second pizzeria, Pep's Pizza, in Medford following Tombstone's sale to Kraft. Simek also pursued other business and philanthropic ventures after Tombstone. He purchased the Enerquip company in Medford. He also entered into the travel and leisure industry, acquiring the Paradise Shores Hotel and Resort in Lake Holcombe, Wisconsin, and Captain Morgan's Retreat in Belize. In 1987, Simek purchased the Embassy Suites and Regency Suites Hotel complex in Green Bay, Wisconsin. He sold his Green Bay hotels in 2007 to the LodgeWorks corporation.

Simek and his wife donated more than one million dollars to Holy Rosary Catholic Church in Medford. The couple also donated $900,000 to fund a new fire station and the Simek Recreation Center. Frances Simek, with the support of her husband, gave one million dollars to construct a new Medford library to halt an ongoing dispute over a source of funding.

Joseph "Pep" Simek died at St. Luke's Medical Center, where he had been hospitalized for two weeks, in Milwaukee, Wisconsin, on February 18, 2013, at the age of 86. His wife, Frances, died in 2010. Simek was survived by three children, Joseph Jr., Richard, and Lauren; and five siblings – Gloria Olmstead, Vlasta Cummings, Bill, and Dan Simek. Ronald Simek, a co-founder of Tombstone Pizza, passed on January 20, 2015.

Joseph "Pep" Simek's interment was at Mount Olive Cemetery in Westboro, Wisconsin.
