= Hubert H. Peavey =

American politician (1881–1937)

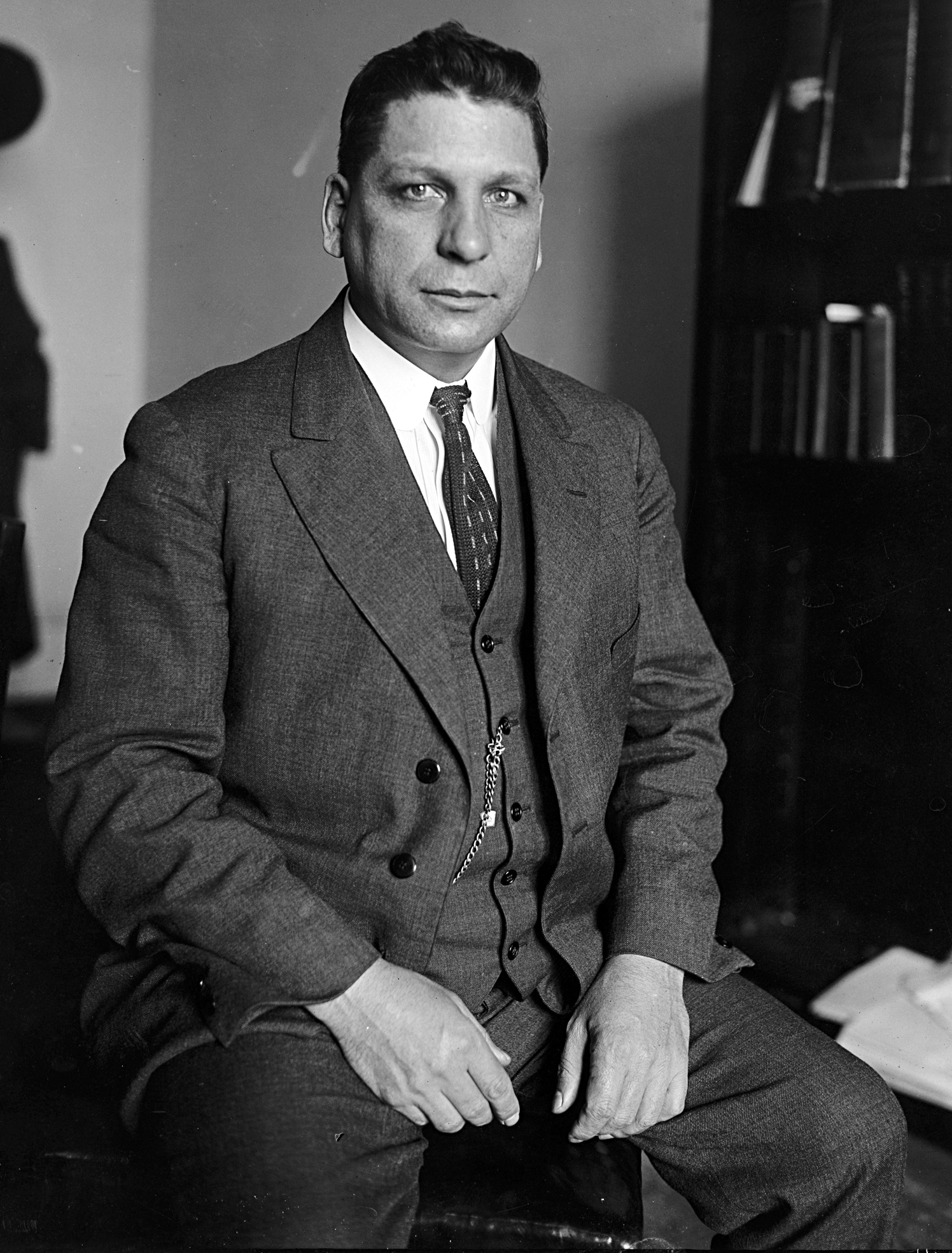

Member of the U.S. House of Representatives from Wisconsin
- In office March 4, 1923 – January 3, 1935
- Preceded by: Adolphus P. Nelson (11th); James A. Frear (10th)
- Succeeded by: District eliminated (11th); Bernard J. Gehrmann (10th)
- Constituency: 11th district (1923-33); 10th district (1933-35)

Member of the Wisconsin State Assembly from the Bayfield County district
- In office January 6, 1913 – January 4, 1915
- Preceded by: District established
- Succeeded by: Walter A. Duffy

Personal details
- Born: January 12, 1881 Adams, Minnesota, U.S.
- Died: November 21, 1937 (aged 56) Washburn, Wisconsin, U.S.
- Party: Republican

Hubert Haskell Peavey (January 12, 1881 – November 21, 1937) was an American politician from Wisconsin. A member of the Republican Party, Peavey served in the United States House of Representatives from 1923 to 1935.

== Background ==
Born in Adams, Minnesota, Peavey moved with his parents to Redwood Falls, Minnesota, in 1886. He attended the public schools, the high school at Redwood Falls, and Pillsbury Academy, in Owatonna, Minnesota. He pursued various activities in Nebraska, Kansas, and Oklahoma from 1900 until 1904, when he moved to South Dakota and engaged in the real estate business. He moved to Washburn, Wisconsin, in 1909 and continued the real estate business.

== Public office ==
He served as alderman in 1911 and as mayor of Washburn in 1912 and from 1920 to 1922. He was elected the member of the Wisconsin State Assembly from the newly created Bayfield County Assembly district in 1912 as a self-described "Progressive Republican" with 1,199 votes to 517 for Democrat Henry Wachsmith and 302 for Social Democrat Gustav Hering; he was not opposed by a regular Republican, and Republican incumbent William Knight was not a candidate. He was the only Assembly member to declare himself a "Progressive Republican" in the Wisconsin Blue Book for 1913. He was not a candidate for re-election in 1914, and was succeeded by Republican Walter A. Duffy.

He became editor and publisher of the Washburn News in 1915.

During the First World War, he joined Company D, Sixth Infantry, Wisconsin National Guard, and served as captain. He was an unsuccessful candidate for the Republican nomination in 1920 to the 67th Congress.

Peavey was elected as a Republican to the 68th Congress and to the five succeeding Congresses. (March 4, 1923 – January 3, 1935) For his first five terms in office he represented Wisconsin's 11th congressional district; however, the district was eliminated in 1933 following the 1930 Census and so Peavey redistricted and was elected to represent Wisconsin's 10th district as part of the 73rd Congress. He was an unsuccessful candidate for reelection in 1934 to the 74th Congress.

== Later life and death ==
He again engaged in the real estate business and also operated a fur ranch.

He died in Washburn, Wisconsin, on November 21, 1937.

He was interred in Woodland Cemetery.

U.S. House of Representatives
Preceded by Adolphus Peter Nelson	Member of the U.S. House of Representatives from Wisconsin's 11th congressional district March 4, 1923 - March 3, 1933	District abolished
Preceded by James A. Frear	Member of the U.S. House of Representatives from Wisconsin's 10th congressional district March 4, 1933 - January 3, 1935	Succeeded by Bernard J. Gehrmann
