= Bernard E. Gehrmann =

American politician (1920–2006)

Member of the Wisconsin State Assembly from the Ashland–Bayfield–Iron district
- In office January 4, 1965 – January 6, 1969
- Preceded by: district established
- Succeeded by: Ernest J. Korpela

Personal details
- Born: November 6, 1920 Mellen, Wisconsin, U.S.
- Died: December 16, 2006 (aged 86) Madison, Wisconsin, U.S.
- Party: Republican
- Spouse: Mary Rose Jellish (m. 1945)
- Children: 5
- Parent: Bernard J. Gehrmann (father)
- Education: University of Wisconsin–Superior
- Occupation: Politician

Military service
- Allegiance: United States
- Branch/service: United States Marine Corps
- Battles/wars: World War II

Bernard E. Gehrmann (November 6, 1920 – December 16, 2006) was an American politician who served as a member of the Wisconsin State Assembly from 1965 to 1968 as a member of the Republican Party.

== Biography ==
Gehrmann was born in Mellen, Wisconsin, on November 6, 1920. He graduated from the University of Wisconsin–Superior and served in the United States Marine Corps during World War II. His father was Bernard J. Gehrmann who served in the Wisconsin Legislature and the United States House of Representatives. In 1945, Gehrmann married Mary Rose Jellish. They had five children. Gehrmann was a sales manager in Ashland and was the president of the Ashland County fair. In 1968, Gehrmann became secretary of the Wisconsin State Highway Department and the family moved to Dane County. Later, Gehrmann served in the Wisconsin State Transportation and Veterans Affairs departments. He died on December 16, 2006, in Madison, Wisconsin.

== Political career ==
Gehrmann was a member of the assembly from 1965 to 1968. Previously, he was a member of the city council of Ashland, Wisconsin and the board of supervisors of Ashland County, Wisconsin. He was a Republican.
