= Chester Howell Werden =

American politician (1857–1930)

Chester Howell Werden (August 10, 1857 – October 31, 1930) was a member of the Wisconsin State Senate.

== Biography ==
Werden was born on August 10, 1857, in Hastings, Ontario. He attended Queen's University. He started his career in lumbering, first in Michigan and later in Wisconsin, where he was active in Merrill and Mason. He moved to Ashland, Wisconsin, in 1920. Werden was seriously injured in a traffic accident in 1925 in which his wife was killed. He died at a hospital in Chicago on October 31, 1930.

== Career ==
Werden was elected to the Senate in 1920. Previously, he was chairman of Mason from 1908 to 1913 and chairman of the Bayfield County, Wisconsin Board from 1911 to 1913. He was a Republican.
