= Tombstone (pizza) =

Brand of frozen pizza

- Product type: Pizza
- Current owner: Nestlé
- Country: United States
- Introduced: 1962; 64 years ago
- Markets: United States
- Website: goodnes.com/tombstone

Tombstone is a brand of frozen pizza. It is available with a variety of toppings, including pepperoni, mushrooms, olives, onions, bell peppers, and sausage. The package design typically includes images of a cactus and the pizza.

== History ==
Tombstone was founded in Medford, Wisconsin, U.S., by Pep Simek, his brother, Ron Simek, and two other individuals in 1962. The name came from The Tombstone Tap, a tavern owned by the Simeks which was located across from a cemetery, hence its name.

In 1988, the Tombstone Pizza Company became a wholly owned but "freestanding" division of Kraft Foods. The employees who worked for Tombstone at the time were allowed to keep their jobs, although Pep and Ron Simek stepped aside from their roles in the business.

On January 5, 2010, Kraft Foods announced it was selling its frozen pizza division to Swiss-based Nestlé Foods as part of a plan to use the proceeds to purchase Cadbury, a maker of dairy milk chocolate. In addition to Tombstone, this included other pizza brands including DiGiorno, Jacks and California Pizza Kitchen's frozen pizza line. The Kraft frozen pizza division is now part of Nestlé D.S.D. (direct store delivery).

== Slogan ==
"What do you want on your Tombstone?" was created by the Chicago office of advertising agency Foote, Cone & Belding, now part of the Interpublic Group of Companies. The slogan was typically used in Western advertising campaigns: a typical television commercial would ostensibly appear to be a public execution, but when the supposed executioner would ask "what do you want on your tombstone?" (i.e. an epitaph), the accused would reply along the lines of "Pepperoni and cheese." A Tombstone pizza would then be summoned.

Another slogan used in 1999 and the early 2000s was "Shoulda had that Tombstone." In one of the television commercials, the growling of a boy's stomach caused him to be caught by his girlfriend's father while hiding in her room.

== See also ==
- List of frozen food brands
