= Bernard J. Gehrmann =

American politician and farmer (1880–1958)

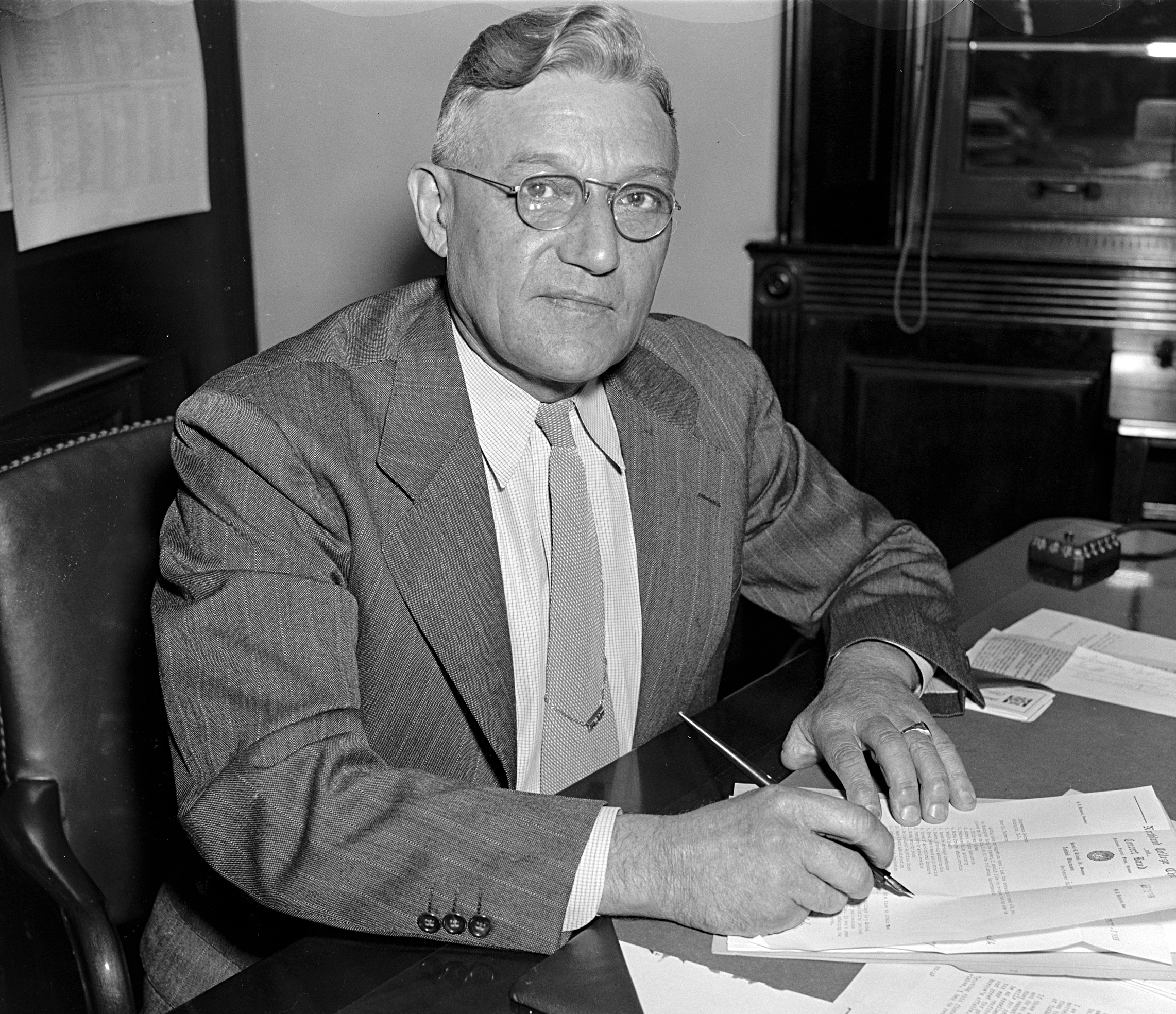

Member of the U.S. House of Representatives from Wisconsin's 10th district
- In office January 3, 1935 – January 3, 1943
- Preceded by: Hubert H. Peavey
- Succeeded by: Alvin O'Konski

Member of the Wisconsin Senate from the 12th district
- In office January 3, 1955 – January 7, 1957
- Preceded by: Paul J. Rogan
- Succeeded by: Clifford Krueger
- In office January 2, 1933 – January 3, 1935
- Preceded by: James H. Carroll
- Succeeded by: Joseph E. McDermid

Member of the Wisconsin State Assembly from the Ashland County district
- In office January 6, 1947 – January 3, 1955
- Preceded by: John C. Chapple
- Succeeded by: district abolished
- In office January 5, 1931 – January 2, 1933
- Preceded by: Lawrence A. Lamoreux
- Succeeded by: Clarence V. Olson
- In office January 3, 1927 – January 7, 1929
- Preceded by: Bernard F. Mathiowetz
- Succeeded by: Lawrence A. Lamoreux

Personal details
- Born: February 13, 1880 Gnesen, East Prussia, Kingdom of Prussia
- Died: July 12, 1958 (aged 78) Mellen, Wisconsin, U.S.
- Resting place: Mellen Union Cemetery, Mellen, Wisconsin
- Party: Progressive (1934–1946); Republican
- Spouse: Mary Ann Miller (m. 1904; died 1957)
- Children: Arthur John Gehrmann^{(b. 1905; died 1990)}; Joseph Edward Gehrmann^{(b. 1906; died 1987)}; Leona M. (Henderson)^{(b. 1907; died 1970)}; Victor Bernard Gehrmann^{(b. 1910; died 1991)}; John Anthony Gehrmann^{(b. 1913; died 1981)}; Lorraine A. (Anderson)^{(b. 1914; died 2009)}; Dorothy Cecelia (Krogerson)^{(b. 1918; died 2014)}; Bernard Eugene Gehrmann^{(b. 1920; died 2006)}; Edward Francis Gehrmann^{(b. 1922; died 2006)}
- Occupation: Farmer

Bernard John Gehrmann (February 13, 1880 – July 12, 1958) was a German American immigrant, farmer, and Progressive Republican politician. He was a member of the United States House of Representatives for four terms, representing Wisconsin's 10th congressional district from 1935 through 1943. He also served four years in the Wisconsin Senate and 12 years in the Wisconsin State Assembly, representing Ashland County.

== Biography ==
Born in Gnesen, near Königsberg, East Prussia, Germany, Gehrmann attended the common schools in Germany. In 1893, Gehrmann immigrated to the United States with his parents, who settled in Chicago, Illinois. He was employed in a packing plant in Chicago, Illinois, and later learned the printing trade on a German-language daily newspaper. He attended night school. He moved to Wisconsin and settled on a farm near Neillsville, in Clark County in 1896 and engaged in agricultural pursuits. He moved to a farm near Mellen, Wisconsin, in Ashland County in 1915.

He served as clerk of the school board 1916–1934, town assessor 1916–1921, and chairman of the town board from 1921 to 1932. Gehrmann conducted farmers' institutes throughout the State for the University of Wisconsin College of Agriculture from 1920 to 1933. He served in the Wisconsin State Assembly from 1927 to 1933. He was a delegate to the Republican National Convention in 1932. He served as member of the Wisconsin State Senate in 1933 and 1934.

Gehrmann was elected as a Progressive to the Seventy-fourth and to the three succeeding Congresses (January 3, 1935 – January 3, 1943). He represented Wisconsin's 10th congressional district. He was an unsuccessful candidate for reelection in 1942 to the Seventy-eighth Congress. He engaged in work for the United States Department of Agriculture from January 1943 to April 1945. Gehrmann was elected to the Wisconsin State Assembly in 1946, 1948, 1950, and 1952. He was elected to the Wisconsin State Senate in 1954 for the term ending in January 1957.

He died of a heart attack in Mellen, Wisconsin, July 12, 1958. He was interred in Mellen Union Cemetery.

His son was Bernard E. Gehrmann, who also served in the Wisconsin State Assembly.

Wisconsin's 10th congressional district (1935-1943)

Wisconsin State Assembly
Preceded by Bernard F. Mathiowetz	Member of the Wisconsin State Assembly from the Ashland County district January 3, 1927 – January 7, 1929	Succeeded by Lawrence A. Lamoreux
Preceded by Lawrence A. Lamoreux	Member of the Wisconsin State Assembly from the Ashland County district January 5, 1931 – January 2, 1933	Succeeded by Clarence V. Olson
Preceded by John C. Chapple	Member of the Wisconsin State Assembly from the Ashland County district January 6, 1947 – January 3, 1955	Succeeded by Vic C. Wallin (Ashland–Bayfield)
Wisconsin Senate
Preceded by James H. Carroll	Member of the Wisconsin Senate from the 12th district January 2, 1933 – January 3, 1935	Succeeded by Joseph E. McDermid
Preceded by Paul J. Rogan	Member of the Wisconsin Senate from the 12th district January 3, 1955 – January 7, 1957	Succeeded by Clifford Krueger
U.S. House of Representatives
Preceded by Hubert H. Peavey	Member of the U.S. House of Representatives from Wisconsin's 10th congressional district January 3, 1935 - January 3, 1943	Succeeded by Alvin O'Konski
