= Bernard F. Mathiowetz =

American politician

Bernard F. Mathiowetz (February 11, 1902 – January 17, 1997) was an American politician.

Born in Sleepy Eye, Minnesota, his family refused to let him go to high school. Mathiowetz left home and worked on the Soo Line Railroad. In 1922, Mathiowetz graduated from Ashland High School in Ashland, Wisconsin while still working for the Soo Line. He then went to Northland College. He financed his own high school and college education, and in 1924 he was elected as the youngest member of the Wisconsin State Assembly to date. He was a Republican. After his term ended, Mathiowetz received his law degree from University of Wisconsin Law School and then practiced law in Milwaukee, Wisconsin. Mathiowetz died in Milwaukee, Wisconsin.
