= Wisconsin's 10th congressional district =

Coordinates: 46°10′N 91°35′W

- Obsolete district
- Created: 1890
- Eliminated: 1970
- Years active: 1893-1973

Wisconsin's 10th congressional district is a former congressional district of the United States House of Representatives in Wisconsin. It was created following the 1890 census, and was abolished after the 1970 census.

Throughout its existence it was located in the northwest or north of Wisconsin. Between the 1900 census and the 1930 census, when Wisconsin had its greatest ever representation of eleven districts, the 10th district covered initially the rural area bordering Michigan, but after redistricting in 1910 it was shifted to the west of the state bordering Minnesota. After 1930, the old 11th district covering the northwest bordering Lake Superior was absorbed into the 10th district for the remainder of its existence.

With the sole exception of Bernard J. Gehrmann, who represented the district as a Progressive from 1935 to 1943, all representatives ever elected to the seat were members of the Republican Party.

== List of members representing the district ==
Member	Party	Years	Cong ress	Electoral history	District
District established March 4, 1893
Nils P. Haugen (River Falls)	Republican	March 4, 1893 – March 3, 1895	53rd	Redistricted from the 8th district and re-elected in 1892. Retired to run for Governor of Wisconsin.	Barron, Bayfield, Burnett, Chippewa, Douglas, Dunn, Pierce, Polk, Sawyer, St. Croix, & Washburn counties (& Gates County, created from Chippewa in 1901)
John J. Jenkins (Chippewa Falls)	Republican	March 4, 1895 – March 3, 1903	54th 55th 56th 57th	Elected in 1894. Re-elected in 1896. Re-elected in 1898. Re-elected in 1900. Redistricted to the 11th district.	Barron, Bayfield, Burnett, Chippewa, Douglas, Dunn, Pierce, Polk, Sawyer, St. Croix, & Washburn counties (& Gates County, created from Chippewa in 1901)
Webster E. Brown (Rhinelander)	Republican	March 4, 1903 – March 3, 1907	58th 59th	Redistricted from the 9th district and re-elected in 1902. Re-elected in 1904. Retired.	Ashland, Florence, Forest, Langlade, Lincoln, Iron, Marathon, Oneida, Price, Shawano, Taylor, Vilas, & Wood counties
Elmer A. Morse (Antigo)	Republican	March 4, 1907 – March 3, 1913	60th 61st 62nd	Elected in 1906. Re-elected in 1908. Re-elected in 1910. Lost re-election.	Ashland, Florence, Forest, Langlade, Lincoln, Iron, Marathon, Oneida, Price, Shawano, Taylor, Vilas, & Wood counties
James A. Frear (Hudson)	Republican	March 4, 1913 – March 3, 1933	63rd 64th 65th 66th 67th 68th 69th 70th 71st 72nd	Elected in 1912. Re-elected in 1914. Re-elected in 1916. Re-elected in 1918. Re-elected in 1920. Re-elected in 1922. Re-elected in 1924. Re-elected in 1926. Re-elected in 1928. Re-elected in 1930. Redistricted to the 9th district.	Barron, Buffalo, Chippewa, Dunn, Eau Claire, Pepin, Pierce, St. Croix, & Trempealeau counties
Hubert H. Peavey (Washburn)	Republican	March 4, 1933 – January 3, 1935	73rd	Redistricted from the 11th district and re-elected in 1932. Lost re-election.	Ashland, Bayfield, Burnett, Douglas, Iron, Lincoln, Oneida, Polk, Price, Rusk, Sawyer, Taylor, Vilas, & Washburn counties
Bernard J. Gehrmann (Mellen)	Progressive	January 3, 1935 – January 3, 1943	74th 75th 76th 77th	Elected in 1934. Re-elected in 1936. Re-elected in 1938. Re-elected in 1940. Lost re-election.	Ashland, Bayfield, Burnett, Douglas, Iron, Lincoln, Oneida, Polk, Price, Rusk, Sawyer, Taylor, Vilas, & Washburn counties
Alvin O'Konski (Mercer)	Republican	January 3, 1943 – January 3, 1973	78th 79th 80th 81st 82nd 83rd 84th 85th 86th 87th 88th 89th 90th 91st 92nd	Elected in 1942. Re-elected in 1944. Re-elected in 1946. Re-elected in 1948. Re-elected in 1950. Re-elected in 1952. Re-elected in 1954. Re-elected in 1956. Re-elected in 1958. Re-elected in 1960. Re-elected in 1962. Re-elected in 1964. Re-elected in 1966. Re-elected in 1968. Re-elected in 1970. Redistricted to the 7th district and lost re-election.	Ashland, Bayfield, Burnett, Douglas, Iron, Lincoln, Oneida, Polk, Price, Rusk, Sawyer, Taylor, Vilas, & Washburn counties
Alvin O'Konski (Mercer)	Republican	January 3, 1943 – January 3, 1973	78th 79th 80th 81st 82nd 83rd 84th 85th 86th 87th 88th 89th 90th 91st 92nd	Elected in 1942. Re-elected in 1944. Re-elected in 1946. Re-elected in 1948. Re-elected in 1950. Re-elected in 1952. Re-elected in 1954. Re-elected in 1956. Re-elected in 1958. Re-elected in 1960. Re-elected in 1962. Re-elected in 1964. Re-elected in 1966. Re-elected in 1968. Re-elected in 1970. Redistricted to the 7th district and lost re-election.	Ashland, Barron, Bayfield, Burnett, Chippewa, Douglas, Dunn, Eau Claire, Iron, Oneida, Polk, Price, Rusk, Sawyer, St. Croix, Vilas, & Washburn counties
District dissolved January 3, 1973
