= Washburn, Wisconsin =

- City
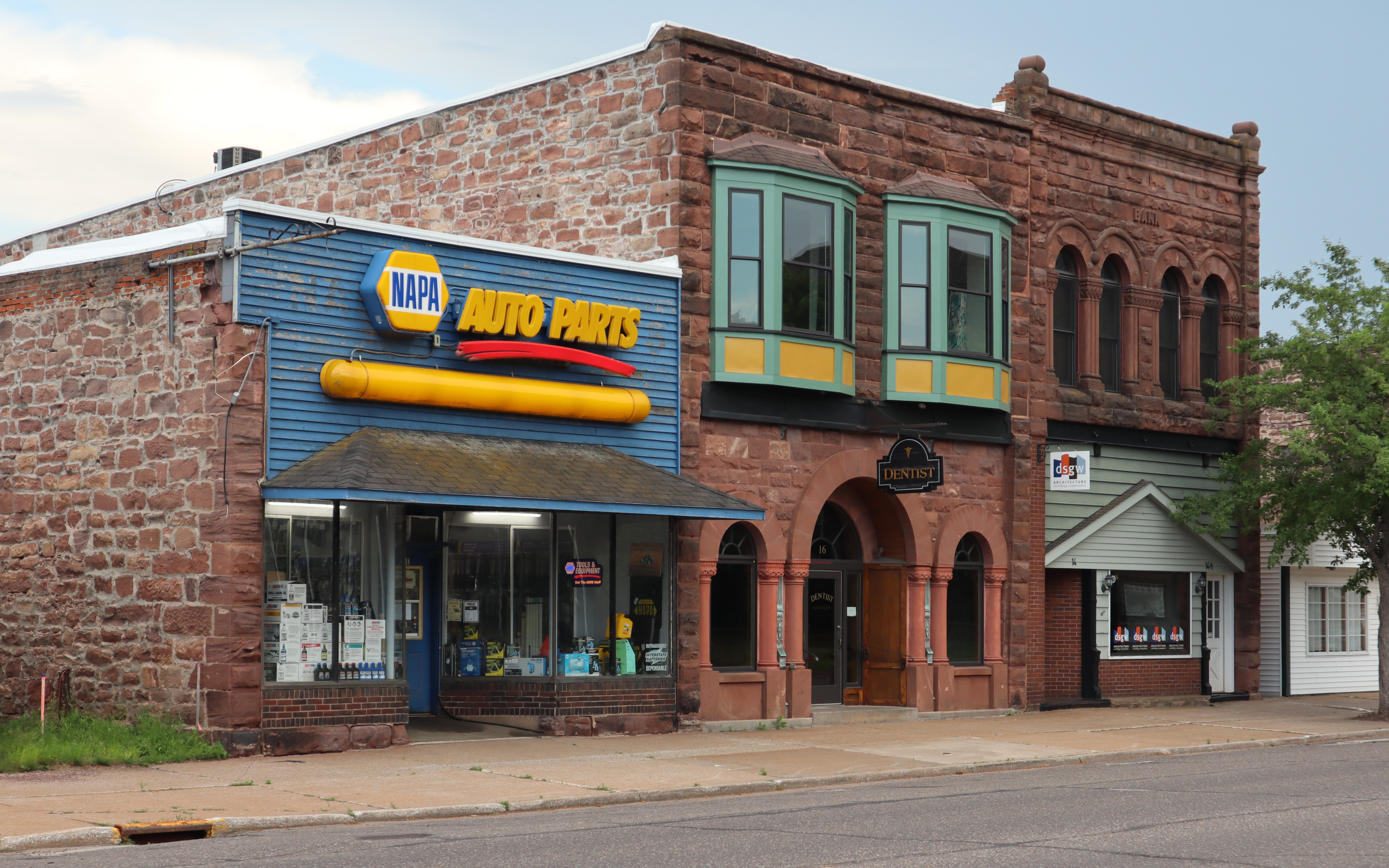
- The main street (Bayfield Street / WIS 13) in downtown Washburn

- Location of Washburn in Bayfield County, Wisconsin.

- Location within Wisconsin Location within the United States
- Coordinates: 46°40′26″N 90°53′52″W
- Country: United States
- State: Wisconsin
- County: Bayfield

Government
  - Type: Mayor–council
  - Mayor: Mary D. Motiff

Area
  - Total: 3.92 sq mi (10.14 km^{2})
  - Land: 3.91 sq mi (10.13 km^{2})
  - Water: 0.0039 sq mi (0.01 km^{2})
- Elevation: 692 ft (211 m)

Population (2020)
  - Total: 2,051
  - Density: 524.2/sq mi (202.4/km^{2})
- Time zone: UTC-6 (Central (CST))
  - Summer (DST): UTC-5 (CDT)
- ZIP Code: 54891
- Area codes: 715 & 534
- FIPS code: 55-83525
- GNIS feature ID: 1576230
- Website: www.cityofwashburnwi.gov

Washburn is a city and the county seat of Bayfield County, Wisconsin, United States. The population was 2,051 at the 2020 census. The city is just east of and adjacent to the Town of Washburn. It is in northern Wisconsin, on the shore of Lake Superior's Chequamegon Bay.

Wisconsin Highway 13 and County Highway C are the main routes in the community.

== History ==
In 1659, the French explorers Radisson and Groseilliers touched here on their trip along the south shore of Lake Superior. In 1665 the Jesuit Claude-Jean Allouez established on the shore of the bay, a short distance south of the present city, the first French mission in Wisconsin. He named it "La Pointe du Saint Esprit," and in 1669 it was placed in charge of Father Jacques Marquette. The place was visited by Daniel Greysolon (Du Luth) in 1681–1682, and here in 1693 Pierre-Charles Le Sueur built a stockaded post. In 1718 a fort was erected and a French garrison placed in it. About 1820–1821 a trading post of the American Fur Company was established in the area.

The city itself was founded in 1883, named for Cadwallader C. Washburn, Republican governor of Wisconsin from 1872 until 1874. It was chartered in 1904.

== Geography ==
According to the United States Census Bureau, the city has a total area of 6.17 square miles (15.98 km^{2}), of which 3.90 square miles (10.10 km^{2}) is land and 2.27 square miles (5.88 km^{2}) is water.

== Demographics ==
Historical population
Census	Pop.	Note	%±
1890	3,039		—
1910	3,830		—
1920	3,707		−3.2%
1930	2,238		−39.6%
1940	2,363		5.6%
1950	2,070		−12.4%
1960	1,896		−8.4%
1970	1,957		3.2%
1980	2,080		6.3%
1990	2,285		9.9%
2000	2,280		−0.2%
2010	2,117		−7.1%
2020	2,051		−3.1%
U.S. Decennial Census

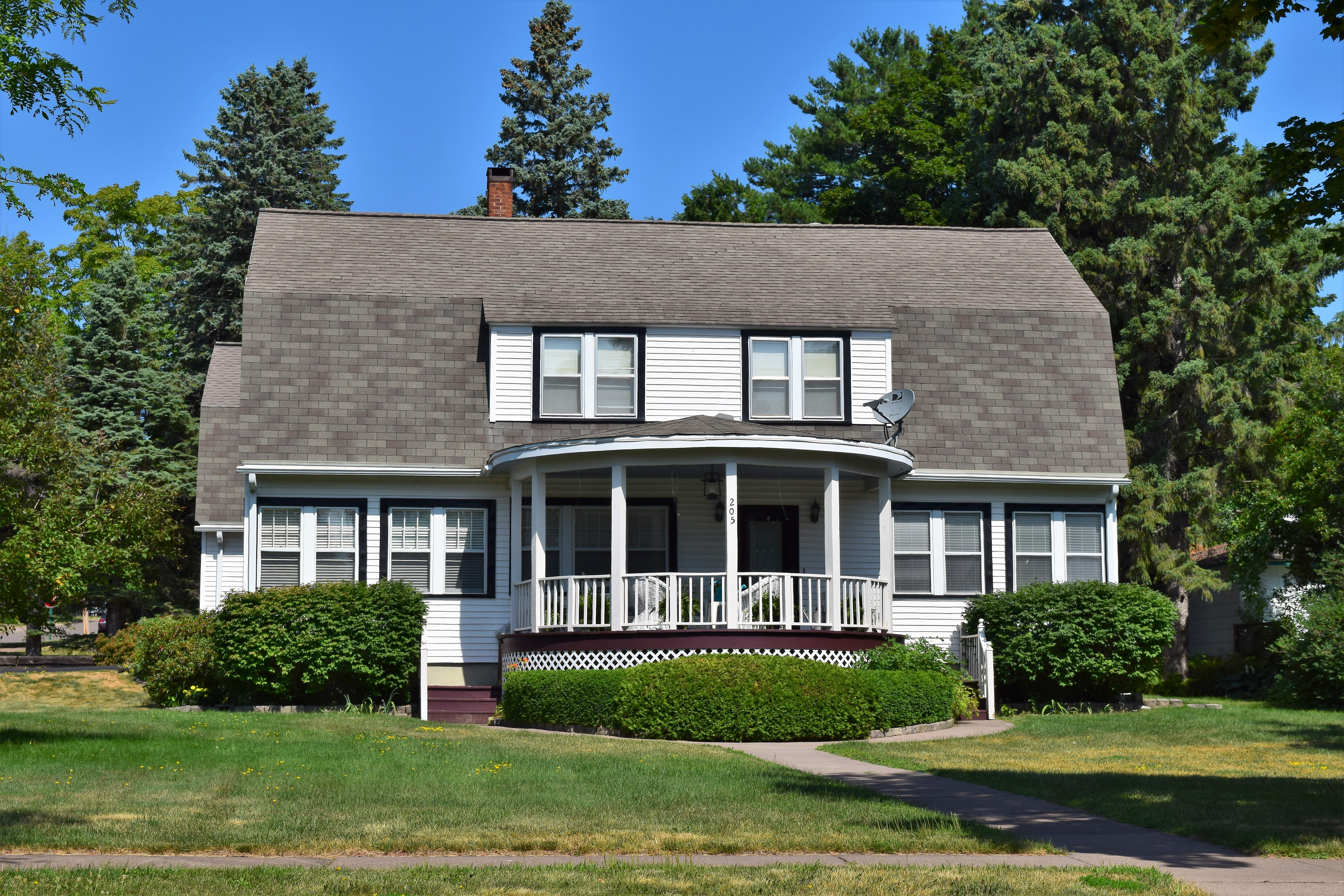
A house in the East Third Street Residential Historic District

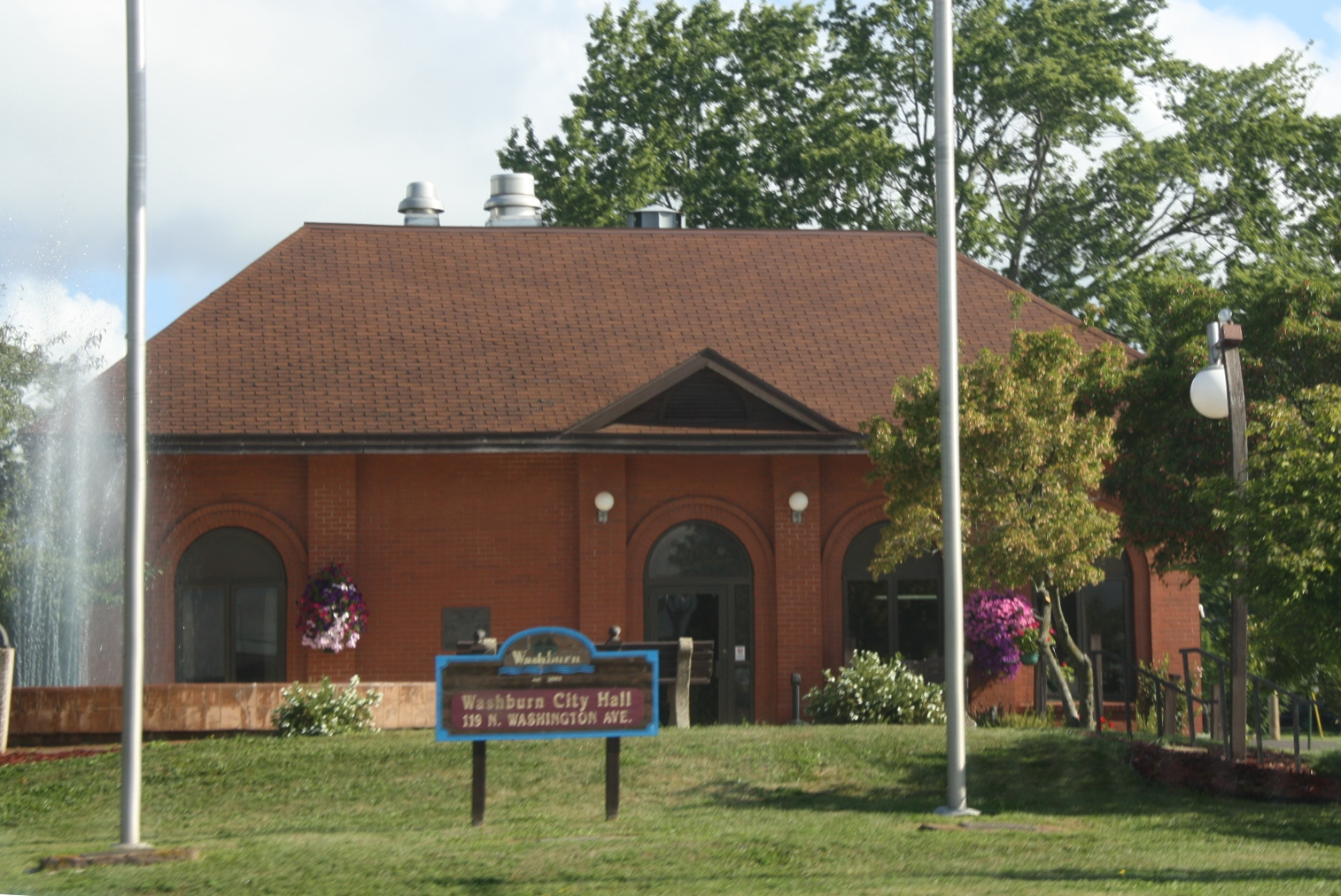
City hall

=== 2020 census ===
As of the census of 2020, the population was 2,051. The population density was 524.2 inhabitants per square mile (202.4/km^{2}). There were 1,059 housing units at an average density of 270.6 per square mile (104.5/km^{2}). The racial makeup of the city was 85.9% White, 5.2% Native American, 0.6% Black or African American, 0.2% Asian, 1.3% from other races, and 6.8% from two or more races. Ethnically, the population was 2.9% Hispanic or Latino of any race.

=== 2010 census ===
As of the census of 2010, there were 2,117 people, 934 households, and 531 families living in the city. The population density was 542.8 inhabitants per square mile (209.6/km^{2}). There were 1,070 housing units at an average density of 274.4 per square mile (105.9/km^{2}). The racial makeup of the city was 88.4% White, 0.8% African American, 5.9% Native American, 0.3% Asian, 0.6% from other races, and 4.1% from two or more races. Hispanic or Latino of any race were 1.6% of the population.

There were 934 households, of which 26.8% had children under the age of 18 living with them, 42.5% were married couples living together, 9.9% had a female householder with no husband present, 4.5% had a male householder with no wife present, and 43.1% were non-families. 38.3% of all households were made up of individuals, and 16.9% had someone living alone who was 65 years of age or older. The average household size was 2.15 and the average family size was 2.82.

The median age in the city was 45.9 years. 21.6% of residents were under the age of 18; 6.3% were between the ages of 18 and 24; 21.1% were from 25 to 44; 32.2% were from 45 to 64; and 18.8% were 65 years of age or older. The gender makeup of the city was 48.7% male and 51.3% female.

=== 2000 census ===
As of the census of 2000, there were 2,280 people, 938 households, and 589 families living in the city. The population density was 581.5 people per square mile (224.6/km^{2}). There were 1,004 housing units at an average density of 256.1 per square mile (98.9/km^{2}). The racial makeup of the city was 92.06% White, 0.18% Black or African American, 5.61% Native American, 0.44% Asian, 0.35% from other races, and 1.36% from two or more races. Hispanic or Latino of any race were 0.66% of the population. 26.8% were of German, 14.2% Norwegian, 7.1% French, 7.1% Polish, 6.7% Irish, 5.6% English and 5.5% Swedish ancestry according to Census 2000.

There were 938 households, out of which 33.0% had children under the age of 18 living with them, 45.0% were married couples living together, 13.1% had a female householder with no husband present, and 37.2% were non-families. 33.2% of all households were made up of individuals, and 13.5% had someone living alone who was 65 years of age or older. The average household size was 2.33 and the average family size was 2.97.

In the city, the population was spread out, with 26.6% under the age of 18, 6.2% from 18 to 24, 25.8% from 25 to 44, 25.2% from 45 to 64, and 16.1% who were 65 years of age or older. The median age was 40 years. For every 100 females, there were 92.2 males. For every 100 females age 18 and over, there were 89.5 males.

The median income for a household in the city was $33,257, and the median income for a family was $40,781. Males had a median income of $31,875 versus $23,235 for females. The per capita income for the city was $15,331. About 7.5% of families and 10.3% of the population were below the poverty line, including 12.3% of those under age 18 and 6.4% of those age 65 or over.

== Economy ==
Initially, the city's economy was based on lumbering, with sawmills lining the busy waterfront. It was also a popular summer resort, being especially well known for its boating and fishing. In 1905, the DuPont company opened an explosives plant just outside town, providing an important source of employment as timber resources were growing scarce. The closing of the DuPont plant in 1971 was a severe blow to the local economy.

Currently, the city's economy focuses on the tourist industry and its position as county seat.

== Government ==
Washburn uses a mayor–council form of government. As of March 2020, the current mayor of Washburn is Mary Motiff.

Presidential elections results

Presidential elections results
Year	Republican	Democratic	Third parties
2024	25.6% 337	72.3% 950	2.0% 27
2020	24.9% 320	73.6% 944	1.5% 19
2016	27.0% 329	65.2% 792	7.7% 94
2012	24.5% 290	74.1% 878	1.4% 17
2008	26.0% 311	72.6% 868	1.4% 17
2004	30.5% 383	67.9% 854	1.6% 20
2000	31.4% 327	59.6% 620	8.9% 93

== Media ==
Washburn receives three radio stations from Ashland; WATW, WBSZ and WJJH. Television stations come from the Duluth–Superior market; KDLH, KBJR, WDSE and WDIO.

== Infrastructure ==
Bus service is provided by Bay Area Rural Transit.

== Notable people ==
- Tom Blake, surfer and inventor
- Ted Buffalo, NFL player
- Walter A. Duffy, Wisconsin state representative
- Morgan Hamm, gymnast
- Paul Hamm, gymnast
- Ernest J. Korpela, Wisconsin state representative
- Arthur William McLeod, Wisconsin state representative
- Robert A. Nixon, Wisconsin state representative
- Hubert H. Peavey, U.S. representative from Wisconsin
- Willard Ryan, head coach of the Green Bay Packers
- Wayne Simoneau, Minnesota state representative
- Vic C. Wallin, Wisconsin state representative
- Charles Watson, Wisconsin state representative
