= Joseph E. McDermid =

American politician (1894–1968)

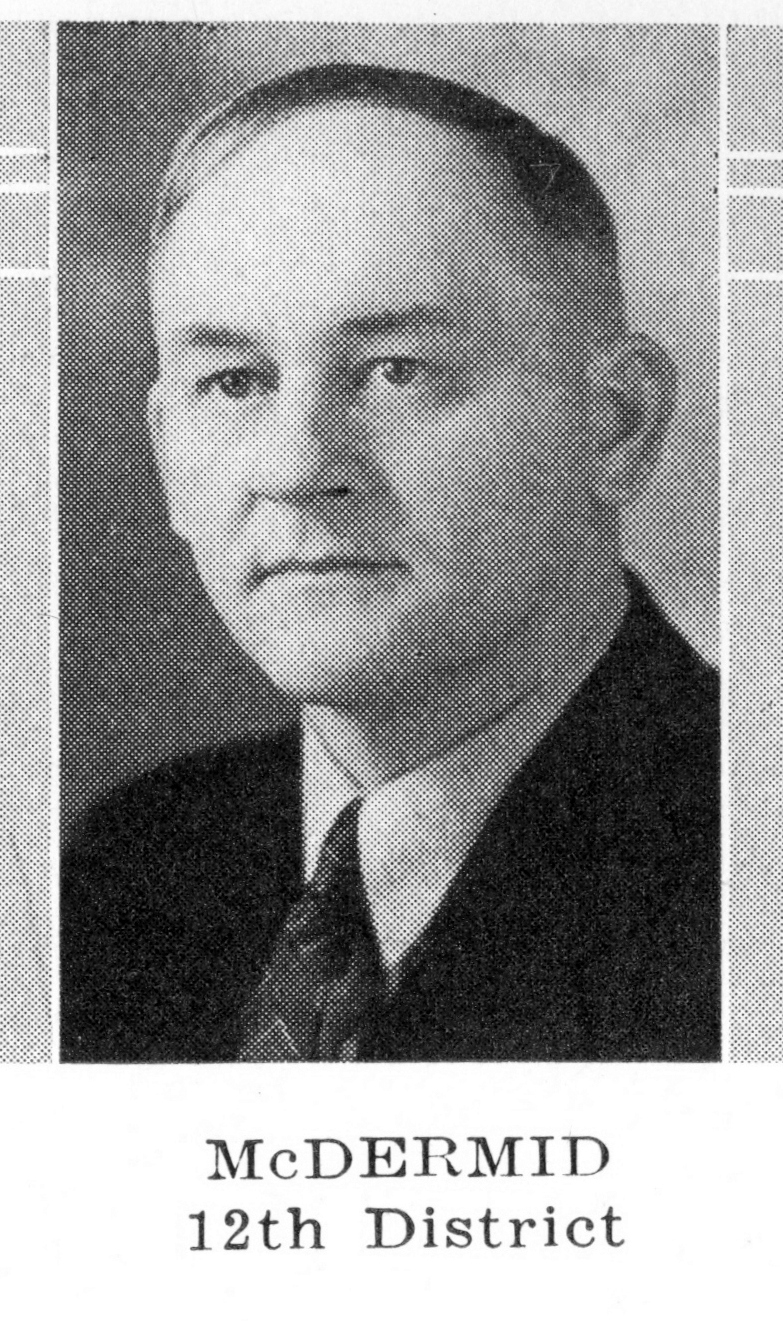
Joseph E. McDermid

Joseph E. McDermid (March 20, 1894 – June 6, 1968) was a member of the Wisconsin State Senate.

== Biography ==
McDermid was born on March 20, 1894, in Minneapolis, Minnesota. During World War I, he served in the United States Army Medical Corps. He was a member of the American Legion.

== Political career ==
McDermid was elected to the Senate in a special election in April 1935. Additionally, he was a member of the Rusk County, Wisconsin Board of Supervisors. He was a member of the Wisconsin Progressive Party.
