= Paul Alfonsi =

20th century American politician

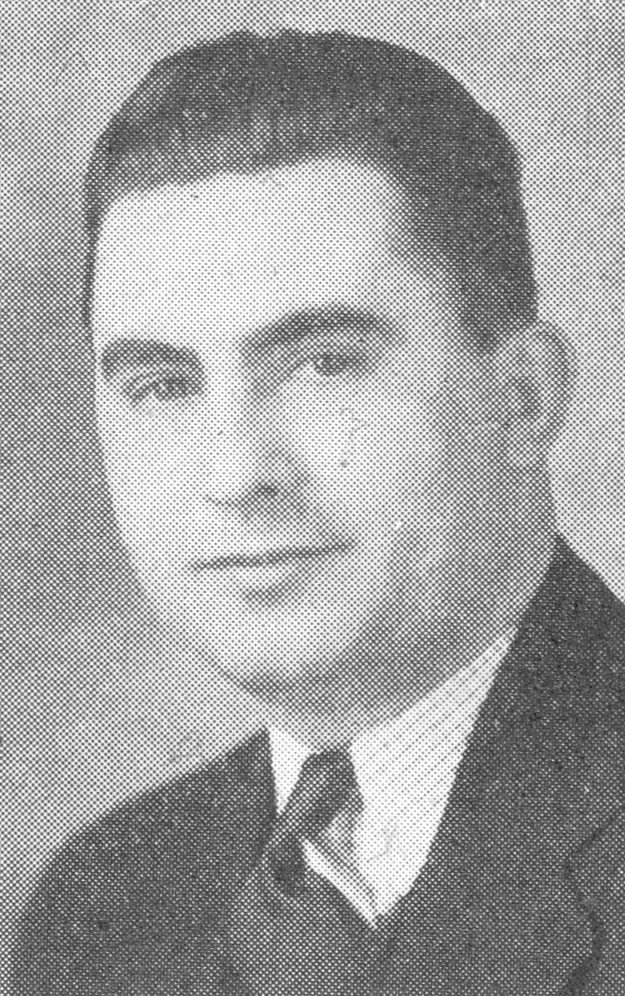
- Alfonsi c. 1940

55th Speaker of the Wisconsin State Assembly
- In office January 4, 1937 – January 2, 1939
- Preceded by: Jorge W. Carow
- Succeeded by: Vernon Wallace Thomson

Majority Leader of the Wisconsin State Assembly
- In office January 6, 1969 – January 4, 1971
- Preceded by: J. Curtis McKay
- Succeeded by: Norman C. Anderson
- In office January 7, 1963 – January 4, 1965
- Preceded by: Robert Haase
- Succeeded by: Frank Nikolay

Minority Leader of the Wisconsin State Assembly
- In office October 4, 1965 – July 8, 1966
- Preceded by: Robert Haase
- Succeeded by: Robert T. Huber

Member of the Wisconsin State Assembly
- In office January 4, 1965 – January 4, 1971
- Preceded by: District created
- Succeeded by: Ellsworth K. Gaulke
- Constituency: Forest–Oneida–Vilas district
- In office January 5, 1959 – January 4, 1965
- Preceded by: Marvin E. Dillman
- Succeeded by: District abolished
- Constituency: Iron–Oneida–Vilas district
- In office January 2, 1933 – January 6, 1941
- Preceded by: John Benson
- Succeeded by: John P. Varda
- Constituency: Iron–Vilas district

Personal details
- Born: February 13, 1908 Pence, Wisconsin, U.S.
- Died: November 22, 1989 (aged 81) Madison, Wisconsin, U.S.
- Resting place: Saint Mary's Cemetery, Hurley, Wisconsin
- Party: Republican; Progressive (1934–1942)
- Spouses: Irene Bresadola (m. 1928; div. 1948); Geraldine Mae Plante (m. 1948–1989)
- Children: 4
- Education: Whitewater State College
- Occupation: Insurance

Military service
- Allegiance: United States
- Branch/service: United States Army
- Years of service: 1943–1946
- Battles/wars: World War II

Paul R. Alfonsi (February 13, 1908 – November 22, 1989) was an American educator, businessman, and Progressive Republican politician from northern Wisconsin. He was the 55th speaker of the Wisconsin State Assembly, and served a total of 20 years in the Assembly, spread over the 1930s, 1950s, and 1960s. Later in his career, he also served two terms as majority leader and half a term as minority leader, when he was convicted of receiving a bribe—that conviction was later reversed by the Wisconsin Supreme Court.

== Early life and education ==
Paul R. Alfonsi was born of Corsican parents in the town of Pence, in Iron County, Wisconsin, on February 13, 1908. He graduated from high school in nearby Hurley, Wisconsin, and went on to earn his bachelor's degree from Whitewater State College (now the University of Wisconsin–Whitewater), in 1928. After graduating, he taught school for several years, and was also employed as a school principal.

== Political career ==
=== Early years in the Progressive party ===
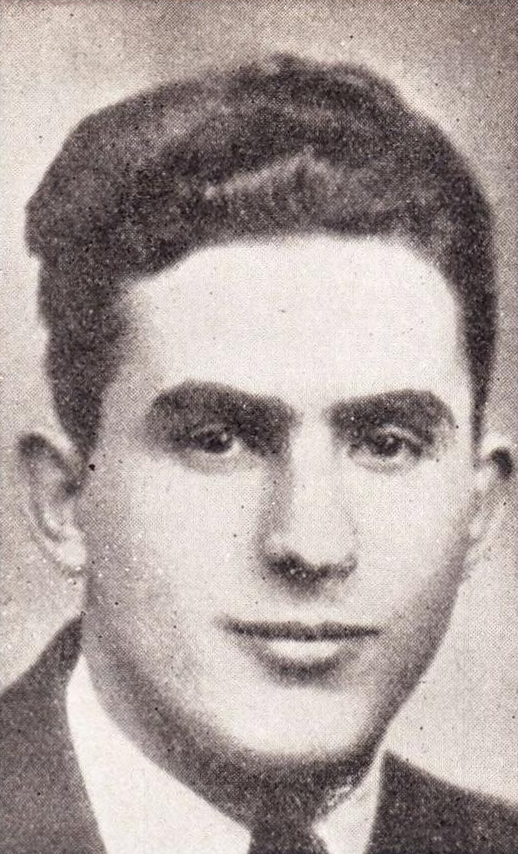
Alfonsi c. 1933

In 1932, Alfonsi made his first run the Wisconsin State Assembly, running on the Republican Party ticket. He prevailed in a five-person Republican primary, running as a member of the progressive faction. He went on to win the general election with 44% of the vote in a three candidate race, with one of his primary opponents running as an independent Republican in the general.

During the 1933 session of the Legislature, the split between the progressive and conservative factions of the Republican Party of Wisconsin finally became a formal schism, with the Wisconsin Progressive Party forming in the spring of 1934. Alfonsi attended the convention which organized the new party and then formed the Iron County Progressive Party, which immediately made him their chairman. He ran for re-election in 1934 on the Wisconsin Progressive ticket and prevailed over Democratic and Republican opponents. Alfonsi was re-elected two more terms as a Progressive in 1936 and 1938, and was chosen as speaker of the Wisconsin State Assembly in the 1937 legislative session.

In 1940, rather than running for a fifth term in the Assembly, Alfonsi decided to seek the Progressive nomination for Governor of Wisconsin in the 1940 Wisconsin gubernatorial election. Alfonsi was ultimately one of five progressives seeking the nomination, and finished a distant fourth in the September primary.

While serving in the Assembly, Alfonsi had also been elected to chairman of the town of Pence and a member of the Iron County board of supervisors, and continued in these offices after leaving the Assembly in 1941. By 1942, Alfonsi had soured on the viability of the Progressive Party as an independent 3rd party and ran for United States House of Representatives in the Republican Party primary. In another five-person primary, Alfonsi came in fourth again.

=== Out of office ===
Less than a year after the 1942 primary, Alfonsi enlisted for service in the United States Army due to the United States entrance into World War II. Over the previous few years, Alfonsi had also studied law at the University of Wisconsin and in the offices of Richard C. Trembath, but did not complete his legal education after his war service. After serving at several domestic bases through 1943 and 1944, he was commissioned a second lieutenant and assigned as a public relations officer at Fort McCoy in Wisconsin in the summer of 1945.

In 1946, as his service in the Army was coming to an end, Alfonsi announced he would run again for state office, seeking the Republican nomination for State Treasurer of Wisconsin. However, Alfonsi arrived half an hour late to file his candidacy paperwork, and was therefore ruled ineligible for the election. Alfonsi attested that he was unaware of the new 5pm deadline—the deadline had previously been midnight. After being disqualified, Alfonsi went to work as campaign manager for the gubernatorial campaign of Ralph M. Immell, who made a surprisingly strong run in the Republican primary against incumbent Governor Walter Samuel Goodland.

After the 1946 elections, Alfonsi was appointed a public relations officer for the Wisconsin Department of Veterans Affairs, and served in that role until the fall of 1947. Subsequently, Alfonsi returned to teaching, residing at Minocqua, Wisconsin, and worked as principal of Minocqua High School.

In 1950, Alfonsi attempted another return to politics, launching a primary challenge against incumbent Republican state representative Clarence W. Gilley in the Florence–Forest–Oneida district. During the primary, Gilley used a 1940s report of the House Un-American Activities Committee to accuse Alfonsi of having associated with communists. At issue was Alfonsi's involvement with the Wisconsin Conference in Social Legislation in the late 1930s and early 1940s. The Wisconsin Conference in Social Legislation was established by labor groups, but was later found to have also received money from communist sources. Alfonsi narrowly lost the primary, receiving 48% of the vote. Alfonsi resumed his teaching career, and remained principal at Minocqua for several more years, resigning ultimately in 1955.

In 1956, he announced his intention to run for Wisconsin Senate in the 12th Senate district, but ultimately did not enter the race.

=== Return to office ===
Alfonsi finally succeeded in returning to office in 1958. He announced his candidacy to run for Assembly again in June 1958. Since the 1954 redistricting, his new home of Minocqua was in the same Assembly district as his native Iron County. He narrowly prevailed in the primary, unseating the incumbent Republican Marvin E. Dillman, and went on to win the general election with 52% of the vote. He defeated Democratic candidate Henry J. Berquist, another former member of the Wisconsin Progressive Party. He was elected to two more terms in this Assembly district before the court-ordered redistricting of 1964, carried out by the Wisconsin Supreme Court.

Following redistricting, Alfonsi won three more terms in his new Assembly district, then comprising Forest, Oneida, and Vilas counties.

He was chosen as majority leader for the 1963–1964 session. After Republicans lost the majority in the 1964 election, the former speaker Robert Haase took over the office of minority leader, but resigned in October 1965 to become state insurance commissioner. The caucus then selected Alfonsi to resume the post as floor leader.

=== Bribery case ===
During the 1965–1966 legislative term, an investigation was initiated in Dane County to look into allegations of violations of the state lobbying law. Ultimately, in June 1966, the investigation resulted in an indictment against Alfonsi and another Republic state representative, Willis J. Hutnik, for receiving bribes. Less than a month later, Alfonsi was convicted by a Dane County jury on charges that he accepted about $100 of travel and lodging expenses associated with official appearances. The Governor, Republican Warren P. Knowles, immediately denounced the verdict, stating that accepting such expenses was common in the Legislature and Congress.

Alfonsi was forced to leave office, but immediately appealed the conviction, ultimately winning a reprieve from the Wisconsin Supreme Court in January 1967, on the grounds that he lacked the corrupt intent required by the statute. In the meantime, Alfonsi was elected to another term while waiting for the Supreme Court decision, but was only allowed to return to office after the conviction was overturned.

Following the Supreme Court decision, Dane County district attorney James Boll initiated another investigation into the Alfonsi case, and announced in July 1967 that he would re-try the bribery case. Republicans in the state generally dismissed the cases as politically-motivated scheme orchestrated by state attorney general Bronson La Follette. The case was eventually transferred to Grant County, where Alfonsi was finally acquitted. La Follette attempted to appeal that verdict to the Wisconsin Supreme Court, on grounds of flawed jury instructions, but was unsuccessful.

Following his acquittal, Alfonsi was elected to his tenth and final term in 1968. He was chosen to serve again as Republican majority leader for the 1969–1970 legislative term. There was speculation in 1970 that he would run for lieutenant governor in 1970, but Alfonsi announced his intention to retire from public office in May of that year.

== Later years ==
After leaving office, Alfonsi served for several years as a lobbyist in Madison, moving his primary residence to the nearby city of Middleton, Wisconsin.

Alfonsi died at the University Hospital in Madison on November 22, 1989.

== Personal life and family ==
Paul Alfonsi was married twice. He married his first wife, Irene Bresadola, in August 1928 in Gogebic County, Michigan. They were married for 20 years before Alfonsi sued for divorce in 1948. At the time, he charged mental cruelty. Almost immediately, Alfonsi married Geraldine Mae Plante in Reno, Nevada. Alfonsi had one daughter with his first wife and three children with his second wife. His second marriage lasted through his death.

His only son, Philip Alfonsi, also became involved in politics and was an aide to state senator Reuben La Fave. He ran for Assembly in 1976, but was not elected.

== Electoral history ==
=== Wisconsin Assembly, Iron–Vilas district (1932–1938) ===
| Year | Election | Date | Elected | | | | Defeated | | | | Total | Plurality |
|---|---|---|---|---|---|---|---|---|---|---|---|---|
| 1932 | Primary | Sep. 20 | Paul R. Alfonsi | Republican | 1,550 | 28.63% | K. Martin Thompson | Rep. | 1,379 | 25.47% | 5,414 | 171 |
| 1932 | Primary | Sep. 20 | Paul R. Alfonsi | Republican | 1,550 | 28.63% | Ed Evenson | Rep. | 1,026 | 18.95% | 5,414 | 171 |
| 1932 | Primary | Sep. 20 | Paul R. Alfonsi | Republican | 1,550 | 28.63% | Arthur Anderson | Rep. | 770 | 14.22% | 5,414 | 171 |
| 1932 | Primary | Sep. 20 | Paul R. Alfonsi | Republican | 1,550 | 28.63% | Charles Lacy | Rep. | 689 | 12.73% | 5,414 | 171 |
| 1932 | General | Nov. 8 | Paul R. Alfonsi | Republican | 2,829 | 44.29% | J. B. Carlin | Dem. | 2,062 | 32.28% | 6,388 | 767 |
| 1932 | General | Nov. 8 | Paul R. Alfonsi | Republican | 2,829 | 44.29% | K. Martin Thompson | Ind.R. | 1,497 | 23.43% | 6,388 | 767 |
| 1934 | General | Nov. 6 | Paul R. Alfonsi (inc) | Progressive | 3,012 | 40.27% | Frank Wierichs | Rep. | 2,246 | 30.03% | 7,480 | 766 |
| 1934 | General | Nov. 6 | Paul R. Alfonsi (inc) | Progressive | 3,012 | 40.27% | William F. Rugee | Dem. | 2,187 | 29.24% | 7,480 | 766 |
| 1934 | General | Nov. 6 | Paul R. Alfonsi (inc) | Progressive | 3,012 | 40.27% | John Christiansen | Ind. | 27 | 0.36% | 7,480 | 766 |
| 1936 | Primary | Sep. 15 | Paul R. Alfonsi (inc) | Progressive | 1,013 | 85.05% | Louis Bertotti | Prog. | 178 | 14.95% | 1,191 | 835 |
| 1936 | General | Nov. 3 | Paul R. Alfonsi (inc) | Progressive | 3,844 | 51.98% | Frank Wierichs | Rep. | 3,551 | 48.02% | 7,395 | 293 |
| 1938 | General | Nov. 8 | Paul R. Alfonsi (inc) | Progressive | 4,368 | 52.79% | William R. Yeschek | Rep. | 3,906 | 47.21% | 8,274 | 462 |

=== Wisconsin Governor (1940) ===
Wisconsin Gubernatorial Election, 1940
| Party | Candidate | Votes | % |
|---|---|---|---|
Progressive Primary, September 17, 1940
| Progressive | Orland Steen Loomis | 50,699 | 33.05% |
| Progressive | Harold E. Stafford | 41,311 | 26.93% |
| Progressive | Philip E. Nelson | 24,485 | 15.96% |
| Progressive | Paul R. Alfonsi | 22,531 | 14.69% |
| Progressive | Henry Gunderson | 14,372 | 9.37% |
| Plurality | | 9,388 | 6.12% |
| Total votes | | 153,398 | 100.0% |

=== U.S. House of Representatives (1942) ===
Wisconsin's 10th Congressional District Election, 1942
| Party | Candidate | Votes | % |
|---|---|---|---|
Republican Primary, September 15, 1942
| Republican | Alvin O'Konski | 10,916 | 41.11% |
| Republican | Andrew Borg | 5,728 | 21.57% |
| Republican | Lyndon Emerich | 5,096 | 19.19% |
| Republican | Paul R. Alfonsi | 3,017 | 11.36% |
| Republican | Dwight Kenyon | 1,795 | 6.76% |
| Plurality | | 5,188 | 19.54% |
| Total votes | | 26,552 | 100.0% |

=== Wisconsin Assembly, Florence–Forest–Oneida District (1950) ===
Wisconsin Assembly, Florence–Forest–Oneida District Election, 1950
| Party | Candidate | Votes | % |
|---|---|---|---|
Republican Primary, September 19, 1950
| Republican | Clarence W. Gilley (incumbent) | 2,410 | 51.67% |
| Republican | Paul R. Alfonsi | 2,254 | 48.33% |
| Plurality | | 156 | 3.34% |
| Total votes | | 4,664 | 100.0% |

=== Wisconsin Assembly, Iron–Oneida–Vilas district (1958–1962) ===
| Year | Election | Date | Elected | | | | Defeated | | | | Total | Plurality |
|---|---|---|---|---|---|---|---|---|---|---|---|---|
| 1958 | Primary | Sep. 9 | Paul R. Alfonsi | Republican | 2,609 | 42.83% | Marvin E. Dillman (inc) | Rep. | 2,540 | 41.69% | 6,092 | 69 |
| 1958 | Primary | Sep. 9 | Paul R. Alfonsi | Republican | 2,609 | 42.83% | Stephen J. Gwidt | Rep. | 943 | 15.48% | 6,092 | 69 |
| 1958 | General | Nov. 4 | Paul R. Alfonsi | Republican | 8,732 | 52.49% | Henry J. Berquist | Dem. | 7,904 | 47.51% | 16,636 | 828 |
| 1960 | Primary | Sep. 13 | Paul R. Alfonsi (inc) | Republican | 3,040 | 76.13% | Stanley J. Gwidt | Rep. | 953 | 23.87% | 3,993 | 2,087 |
| 1960 | General | Nov. 8 | Paul R. Alfonsi (inc) | Republican | 11,366 | 59.34% | Louis Leoni | Dem. | 7,787 | 40.66% | 19,153 | 3,579 |
| 1962 | Primary | Sep. 11 | Paul R. Alfonsi (inc) | Republican | 5,190 | 73.44% | Anthony P. Mutter | Rep. | 1,877 | 26.56% | 7,067 | 3,313 |
| 1962 | General | Nov. 6 | Paul R. Alfonsi (inc) | Republican | 9,658 | 63.21% | Herman F. Jessen | Dem. | 5,621 | 36.79% | 15,279 | 4,037 |

=== Wisconsin Assembly, Forest–Oneida–Vilas district (1964–1968) ===
| Year | Election | Date | Elected | | | | Defeated | | | | Total | Plurality |
|---|---|---|---|---|---|---|---|---|---|---|---|---|
| 1964 | General | Nov. 3 | Paul R. Alfonsi | Republican | 9,939 | 53.29% | Charles J. Marshall | Dem. | 8,713 | 46.71% | 18,652 | 1,226 |
| 1966 | General | Nov. 8 | Paul R. Alfonsi (inc) | Republican | 8,348 | 57.86% | Raymond F. Sloan | Dem. | 6,081 | 42.14% | 14,429 | 2,267 |
| 1968 | General | Nov. 5 | Paul R. Alfonsi (inc) | Republican | 11,123 | 61.56% | John J. Joo | Dem. | 6,946 | 38.44% | 18,069 | 4,177 |

Wisconsin State Assembly
| Preceded by John Benson | Member of the Wisconsin State Assembly from the Iron–Vilas district January 2, 1933 – January 6, 1941 | Succeeded by John P. Varda |
| Preceded by Marvin E. Dillman | Member of the Wisconsin State Assembly from the Iron–Oneida–Vilas district January 5, 1959 – January 4, 1965 | District abolished |
| District created | Member of the Wisconsin State Assembly from the Forest–Oneida–Vilas district January 4, 1965 – January 4, 1971 | Succeeded by Ellsworth K. Gaulke |
| Preceded by Jorge W. Carow | Speaker of the Wisconsin State Assembly; January 4, 1937 – January 2, 1939 | Succeeded by Vernon Wallace Thomson |
| Preceded by Robert Haase | Majority Leader of the Wisconsin State Assembly; January 7, 1963 – January 4, 1965 | Succeeded by Frank Nikolay |
| Preceded by Robert Haase | Minority Leader of the Wisconsin State Assembly; October 4, 1965 – January 2, 1967 | Succeeded by Robert T. Huber |
| Preceded by J. Curtis McKay | Majority Leader of the Wisconsin State Assembly; January 6, 1969 – January 4, 1971 | Succeeded by Norman C. Anderson |
