= Alex J. Raineri =

American judge, Wisconsin Court of Appeals

The Honorable Alex J. Raineri

Wisconsin Circuit Court Judge for the Iron Circuit
- In office August 1, 1978 – 1981
- Preceded by: Position established
- Succeeded by: John P. Varda

District Attorney of Iron County
- In office January 3, 1949 – January 1, 1951
- Preceded by: Joseph C. Raineri
- Succeeded by: George D. Sullivan

Member of the Wisconsin State Assembly from the Iron–Vilas district
- In office January 1, 1945 – January 1, 1949
- Preceded by: Margaret P. Varda
- Succeeded by: William R. Yeschek

Personal details
- Born: September 17, 1918 Hurley, Wisconsin
- Died: October 17, 1994 (aged 76)
- Education: University of Notre Dame; DePaul University
- Profession: lawyer, judge

Alex J. Raineri (September 17, 1918 – October 17, 1994) was an American lawyer, politician, and judge. He was a member of the Wisconsin State Assembly and a Wisconsin Circuit Court Judge.

== Biography ==
Raineri was born on September 17, 1918, in Hurley, Wisconsin. He attended the University of Notre Dame and DePaul University. During World War II, he served in the United States Army Corps of Engineers. He died in Utah on October 17, 1994.

== Political career ==
Raineri was elected to the Assembly in 1944. He was a Republican. He chose not to run again for the Assembly in the 1948 elections.

Legal offices
Preceded by Joseph C. Raineri	District Attorney of Iron County, Wisconsin; 1949 – 1951	Succeeded by George D. Sullivan
Preceded by New circuit	Wisconsin Circuit Court Judge for the Iron Circuit; 1978 – 1981	Succeeded by John P. Varda
