= John E. Burton =

American businessman and financier

John Edgar Burton
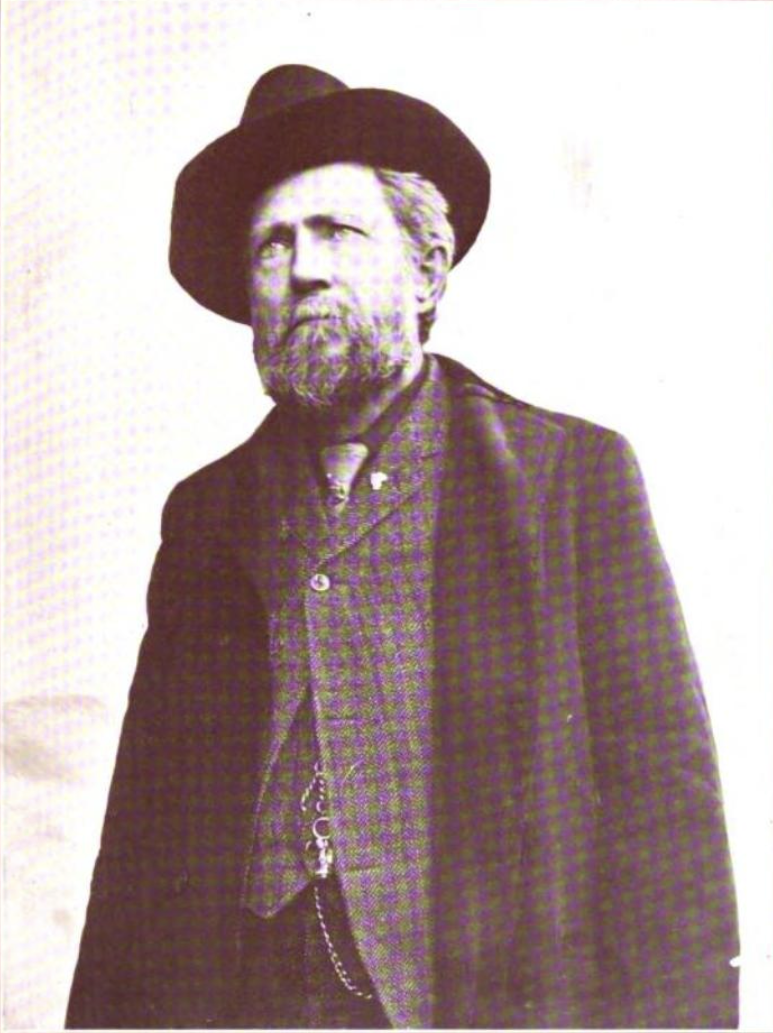
- Born: October 19, 1847; New Hartford, New York, US
- Died: August 13, 1930 (aged 82); Madison, Wisconsin, US
- Occupation: Businessman
- Known for: He operated mines in the United States and invested in real estate
- Spouse: Lucretia Delphine Johnson (m. 1867)
- Children: 4

John Edgar Burton (October 19, 1847 – August 13, 1930) was an American businessman and financier. Burton operated mines in the Gogebic Range of Michigan and Wisconsin, as well as in Alaska's Seward Peninsula, California, Colorado, and Mexico. He also invested in real estate and industry.

== Early life ==
Burton was born on October 19, 1847, in New Hartford, New York, to John Burton Sr. of Comingsby, England and Ruth Janette (Allen) Burton of New Hartford. John Burton Sr. had immigrated in 1829 and worked as a shoemaker. Growing up, John Edgar Burton worked under his father as a shoemaker's apprentice.

Burton graduated from the Whitestown Seminary with high honors in June 1868. He then attended the Cazenovia Seminary, where he won first prize in oratory.

== Career ==
After his schooling, Burton worked as a teacher in Cazenovia and as principal of the public schools in Richmond, Illinois (1868–1870) and Lake Geneva, Wisconsin (1870–1872).

Burton resigned from his teaching post in 1872 to found the Geneva Herald newspaper. Burton published the Herald for four years before selling the paper in 1877.

From 1877 to 1881, Burton invested in real estate and manufacturing in Lake Geneva.

The Equitable Life Assurance Society of New York hired Burton as general agent and manager for Wisconsin in 1881. Burton wrote Wisconsin's first $100,000 insurance policy. He also became general agent and manager for the neighboring states of Michigan and Minnesota. Burton brought in over $6,500,000 in four years.

In 1885, Burton resigned from Equitable Life to speculate in iron and copper mining in Michigan and Wisconsin. Burton became the principal promoter of the Gogebic Range. He built the Burton House, the Iron Exchange Bank, and a foundry in Hurley, which became the capitol of Iron County, Wisconsin. He owned seven mines, employing over 1,000 workers. By 1888, Burton was a millionaire. However, in 1888–1889, Burton's copper mines failed, leading investors to pull their capital.

Following 1889, Burton continued to invest in mining and other industries. He spent $140,000 developing a manufacturing facility in Chicago, situated on the corner of Clinton and Van Buren streets. He also invested in livestock and other Chicago businesses. He expanded his real estate and business holdings in Lake Geneva, which encompassed dozens of buildings (one sixth of the town's property) and companies, including the First National Bank. He invested in the Aguan Navigation and Improvement Company, which sought to construct a canal connecting the Caribbean Sea with the Aguán River of Honduras to benefit mahogany markets. Burton also organized the American Fiber Company, a general fiber producer. He also sought out investment opportunities in Cuba.

In the 1890s, Burton spent five years developing a crystal mine in Calaveras County, California. He also operated the Green Mountain Hydraulic Mine, a gold mine in California, and silver mines in Colorado and Mexico.

Following 1904, Burton developed tin and gold mines in Alaska's Seward Peninsula and consolidated the existing tin mining companies.

== Other interests ==
In 1873, Burton was elected town clerk in Lake Geneva.

Burton was an avid collector. He assembled one of the most comprehensive coin collections in the United States and was a member of the American Numismatic Association. He also assembled a private library of 26,000 volumes, including 3,000 volumes on Abraham Lincoln, which in 1915 formed the largest Lincolniana collection in the world. Burton's collection included a signed copy of the Emancipation Proclamation. In November 1915, Burton sold his collections through Anderson Galleries in New York.

Burton was a Royal Arch Mason and vice president of the Wisconsin Historical Society.

== Personal life ==
Burton married Lucretia Delphine Johnson of Killawag, New York at Lapeer, New York, on December 7, 1869. They had four children. The Burton family lived in Lake Geneva, Wisconsin.

Burton died in Madison, Wisconsin, on August 13, 1930.
