= Richard C. Trembath =

American jurist and politician

Richard Trembath

Judge of Iron County, Wisconsin
- In office January 3, 1938 – January 31, 1960
- Preceded by: J. E. Flandrena
- Succeeded by: George D. Sullivan

District Attorney of Iron County, Wisconsin
- In office January 5, 1931 – January 7, 1935
- Preceded by: Everis H. Reid
- Succeeded by: Joseph C. Raineri Jr.

Member of the Wisconsin State Assembly from the Iron–Vilas district
- In office January 5, 1925 – January 7, 1929
- Preceded by: Hyman M. Mark
- Succeeded by: Charles L. Lacy

Personal details
- Born: January 2, 1896 Montreal, Wisconsin, U.S.
- Died: March 17, 1964 (aged 68) Ironwood, Michigan, U.S.
- Resting place: Hurley Cemetery, Hurley, Wisconsin
- Party: Republican
- Spouse: Ida Cecilia Forsman
- Children: Donald K. Trembath; (b. 1925; died 2012)
- Education: University of Wisconsin (LL.B)
- Profession: Lawyer, judge

Richard C. Trembath Sr. (January 2, 1896 – March 17, 1964) was an American lawyer, judge, and Republican politician from Iron County, Wisconsin. He served two terms in the Wisconsin State Assembly, representing Iron County and neighboring Vilas County during the 1925 and 1927 terms. He later served as district attorney of Iron County, before serving 22 years as county judge.

== Early life ==
Born in Montreal, Wisconsin, Trembath graduated from Hurley High School in 1912, in Hurley, Wisconsin.

== Career ==
Trembath began his career as an educator. From 1917 to 1924, Trembath served as register of deeds for Iron County, Wisconsin as a Republican. In 1925 and 1927, Trembath served in the Wisconsin State Assembly. During his time in the Wisconsin Assembly, Trembath studied law at the University of Wisconsin Law School and was admitted to the Wisconsin bar in 1917. Trembath practiced law in Hurley, Wisconsin. He then served as district attorney for Iron County and on the Iron County Board of Supervisors. From 1938 until 1960, Trembath served as county judge for Iron County.

== Death ==
Trembath died at Grand View Hospital in Ironwood, Michigan. He was buried in Hurley.

== Notes ==
Wisconsin State Assembly
Preceded by Hyman M. Mark	Member of the Wisconsin State Assembly from the Iron–Vilas district January 5, 1925 – January 7, 1929	Succeeded by Charles L. Lacy
Legal offices
Preceded by Everis H. Reid	District Attorney of Iron County, Wisconsin; January 5, 1931 – January 7, 1935	Succeeded by Joseph C. Raineri Jr.
Preceded by J. E. Flandrena	Judge of Iron County, Wisconsin; January 3, 1938 – January 31, 1960	Succeeded by George D. Sullivan
