= William Whiteside =

American politician

William Whiteside (November 5, 1881 – ?), was an American politician. He was a member of the Wisconsin State Assembly.

Whiteside was born in Marquette County, Michigan.

Whiteside later moved to Hurley, Wisconsin and worked as a machinist for U.S. Steel and Cleveland-Cliffs.

Whiteside was elected to the Assembly in 1912 as a Republican. He was previously elected as Treasurer of Iron County, Wisconsin in 1908 and as Sheriff in 1910.
