= Arne H. Wicklund =

American businessman, lawyer, jurist, and legislator

Arne H. Wicklund (March 13, 1926 – October 6, 1990) was an American businessman, lawyer, jurist, and legislator.

Born in Gile, Wisconsin, Wicklund graduated from Lincoln High School in Hurley, Wisconsin. While in high school, Wicklund was a reporter for the Iron County Miner newspaper. Wicklund received his bachelor's degree from University of Wisconsin–Madison and his law degree from University of Wisconsin Law School. He then practiced law in Hurley, Wisconsin and was in the real estate business. During the 1951 and 1953 sessions, Wicklund served in the Wisconsin State Assembly and was a Democrat. He was the right-of-way attorney for the state of Wisconsin and a Wisconsin Highway Supervisor. From 1964 to 1972, Wicklund served as Iron County, Wisconsin judge. Wicklund died at his home in Gile, Wisconsin.
