= Margaret P. Varda =

American politician

Margaret Pinkley Varda (June 30, 1917 – February 13, 2011) was an American lawyer and politician.

Born in Milwaukee, Wisconsin, Varda received her bachelor's degree from what is now the University of Wisconsin–Madison and her law degree from University of Wisconsin Law School. She was one of the first 100 women to earn a law degree from the school. In 1941, she married John P. Varda, whom she meet in law school. They then moved to Eagle River, Wisconsin, where they open a law office: Varda & Varda. John P. Varda ran for and won a seat in the Wisconsin State Assembly on the Wisconsin Progressive Party ticket. John Varda resigned from the Wisconsin Assembly and joined the United States Army during World War II. Margaret Varda then ran for her husband's seat and was elected to the Wisconsin State Assembly.

She did not seek re-election and joined the Women's Army Corps in the United States Army during the war. She was assigned to the European theater and had the good fortune to be located only 50 miles from her husband, who, by the time she arrived, was serving as Deputy Military Governor in Aschaffenburg, Germany. She became pregnant with their first child, John Duncan, and returned to the United States. In 1950, Varda and her husband moved to Madison, Wisconsin and her husband was named general manager of the Wisconsin Motor Carriers Association (WMCA). In 1952, Varda ran in the Republican primary for a Wisconsin Assembly seat and lost the election, mainly for her refusal to endorse the politics of Senator Joseph McCarthy. She turned her focus to raising four sons and remained active as a public member on Joint Legislative Council committees regarding government taxes and operations (1964), educational reorganization (1968), and the Coordinating Committee on Higher Education (1962), which set the ground work for the consolidation of higher educational institutions into the University of Wisconsin system.

In 1981, Varda and her husband moved to Hurley, Wisconsin when John Varda became a Wisconsin Circuit Court judge. In 2003, Varda moved back to Madison, Wisconsin. She lived there until her death in 2011.

Varda had four sons: John Duncan Varda (attorney); Michael Varda (attorney); Anthony Varda (attorney); and Richard Varda (architect).
