= Montreal Company Location Historic District =

- U.S. National Register of Historic Places
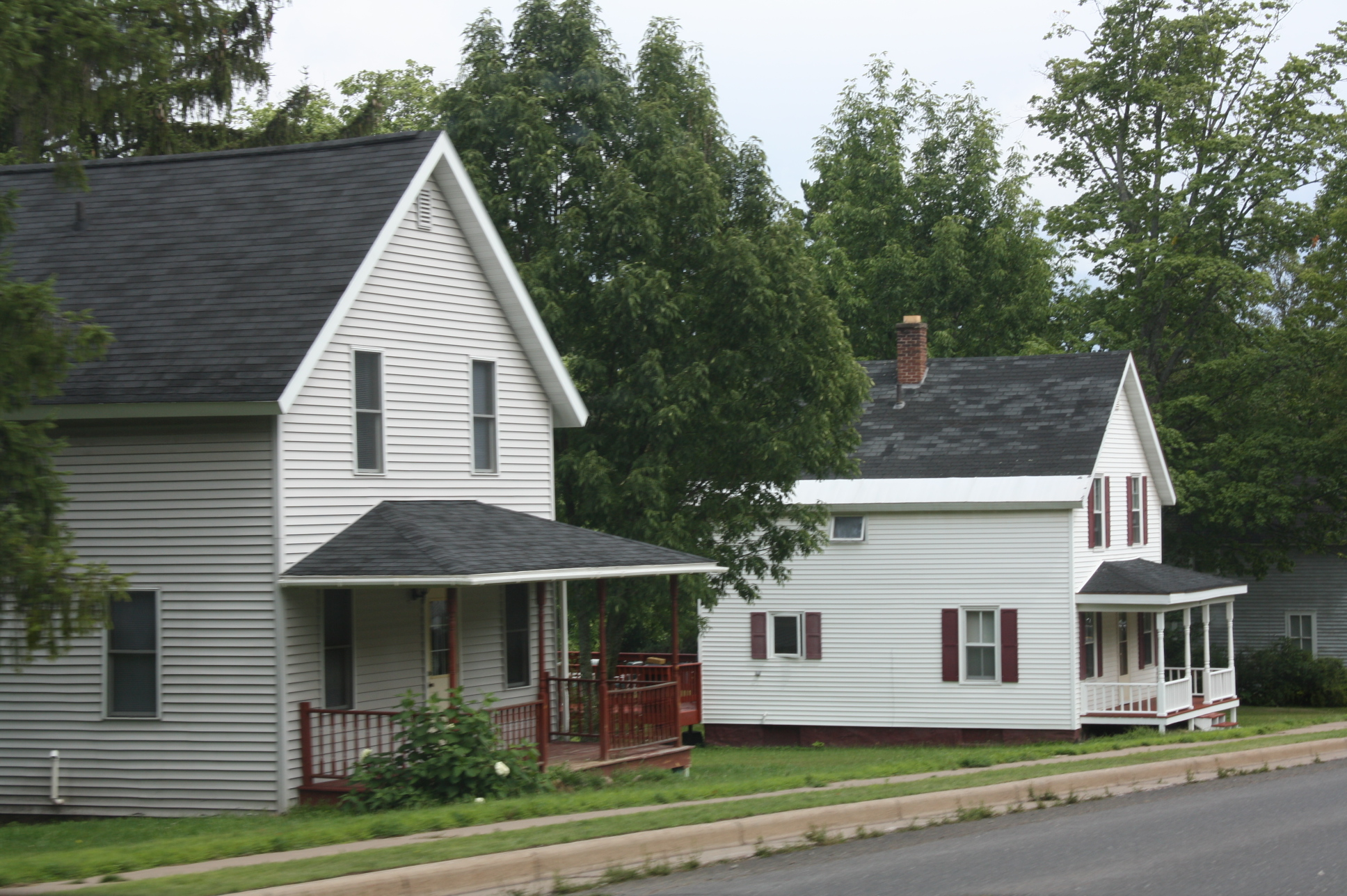
- Two larger-style houses in the district

- Location within Wisconsin Location within the United States
- Location: Montreal, Wisconsin
- Architect: Albert Davis Taylor
- NRHP reference No.: 80000141
- Added to NRHP: May 23, 1980

The Montreal Company Location Historic District is located in Montreal, Wisconsin. It was added to the National Register of Historic Places in 1980.

== History ==
Buildings for the Montreal Mining Company itself and houses for employees of the company were constructed from 1907 to 1927. Much of the area was designed by landscape architect Albert Davis Taylor.

== Images ==
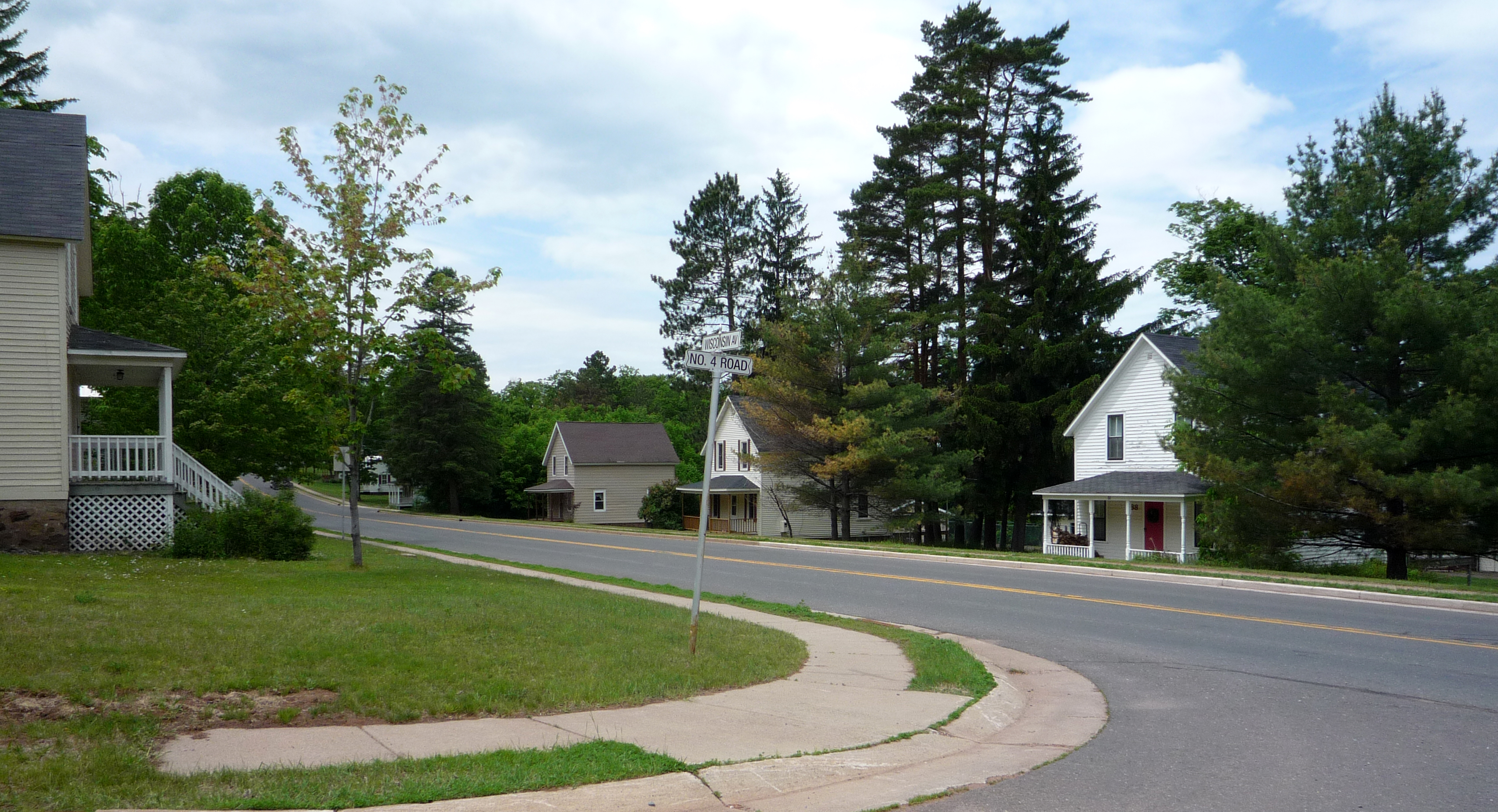
A portion of the district

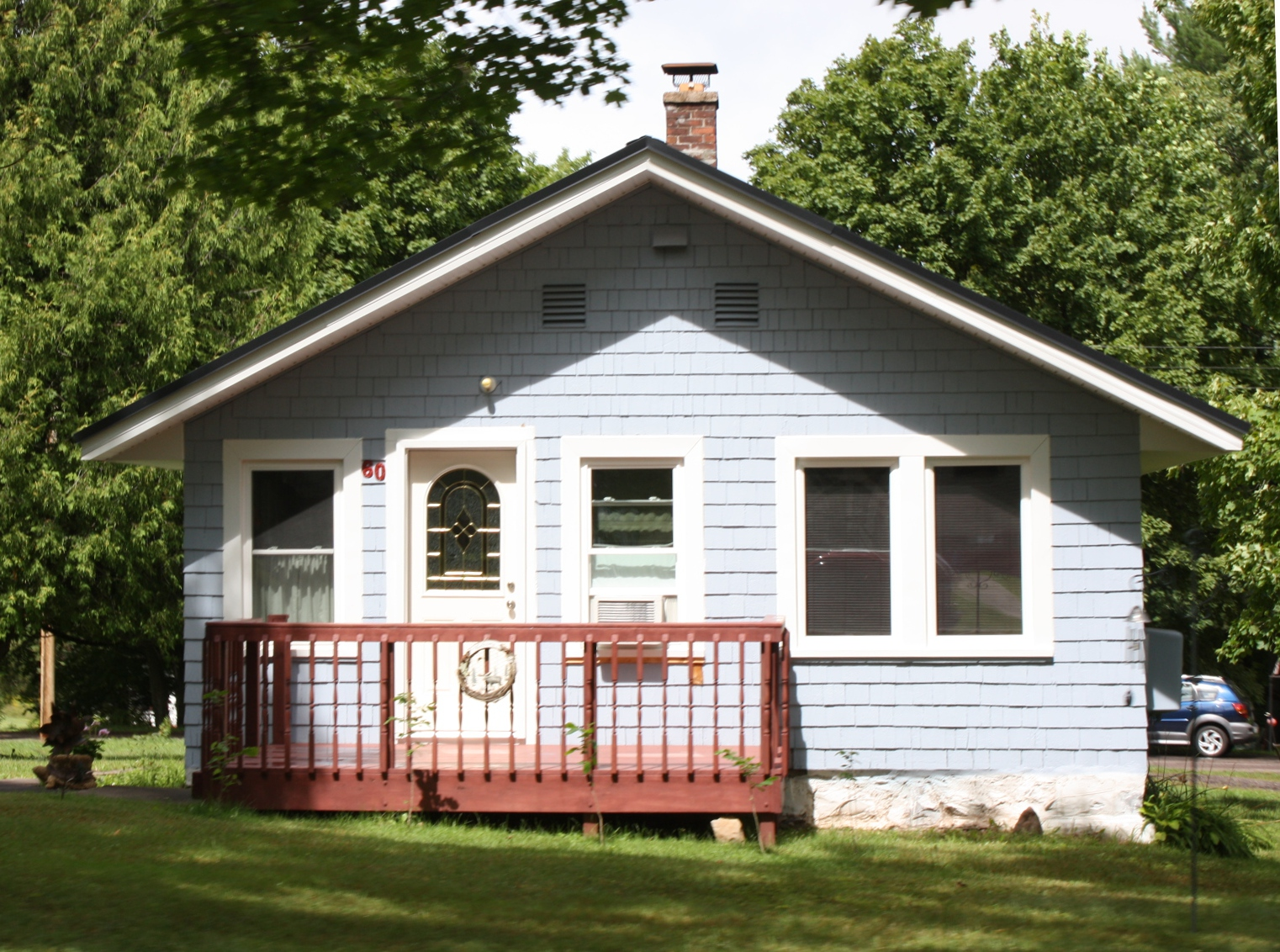
Smaller-style house
