= Ellsworth Gaulke =

American businessman, educator, and politician

Member of the Wisconsin State Assembly from the Forest–Oneida–Vilas district
- In office January 4, 1971 – January 1, 1973
- Preceded by: Paul Alfonsi
- Succeeded by: District abolished

Personal details
- Born: October 6, 1925 Wausau, Wisconsin
- Died: October 1, 1993 (aged 67)
- Party: Democrat

Ellsworth K. Gaulke (October 6, 1925 – August 1, 1993) was an American businessman, educator, and politician.

Born in Wausau, Wisconsin, Gaulke served in the United States Army Air Forces during World War II. He received his bachelor's and master's degrees from what is now Central Michigan University and did graduate work at University of Minnesota Duluth. He was a school principal and restaurant owner in Lac du Flambeau, Wisconsin. He served as town board chairman and on the school board. Gaulke served in the Wisconsin State Assembly as a Democrat in 1971.
