= Joseph Sullivan (FBI agent) =

American security inspector (1917–2002)

- Born: February 17, 1917; Montreal, Wisconsin, U.S.
- Died: August 2, 2002 (aged 85); Manhattan, New York City, U.S.
- Occupation: FBI Major Case Inspector

Joseph Aloysius Sullivan (February 17, 1917 – August 2, 2002) was a Major Case Inspector for the Federal Bureau of Investigation from 1941 to 1977. Born in Montreal, Wisconsin, he grew up in Hurley, Wisconsin and died in Manhattan, New York City. He was involved in a number of highly publicized cases in the sixties and seventies including the assassination of Martin Luther King Jr., the murder of United Mine Workers reformer Joseph "Jock" Yablonski, the Sterling Hall bombing at the University of Wisconsin–Madison, and the Kent State shootings. Despite his involvement in such high-profile cases, Sullivan is best known for his relentless search to track down the killers of three civil rights workers, who were brutally slain in Mississippi in 1964.

== Popular culture ==
The character played by Willem Dafoe (himself, incidentally, also a native Wisconsinite) in the movie Mississippi Burning is loosely based on Sullivan. According to The FBI – A Comprehensive Reference Guide (1998), edited by Athan G. Theoharis, Sullivan was also the model for Inspector Lew Erskine, the lead character played by Efrem Zimbalist, Jr., on the TV series The FBI. Upon Sullivan's death in 2002, author Tom Clancy is quoted as referring to him as "the greatest lawman America ever produced."
