= Chester P. Emunson =

American politician

Chester P. Emunson (August 16, 1886 – May 9, 1956) was a politician in the State of Michigan.

== Biography ==
Emunson was born in Hurley, Wisconsin. He was engaged in the printing business and was a member of the Benevolent and Protective Order of Elks.

== Career ==
Emunson served in the Michigan State House of Representatives from 1933 to 1936. He unsuccessfully ran for the Democratic primary for U.S. Representative in 1936. In 1940 and 1942, he was also defeated when he ran for his former seat in the State House of Representatives.
