= Old Iron County Courthouse =

- U.S. National Register of Historic Places
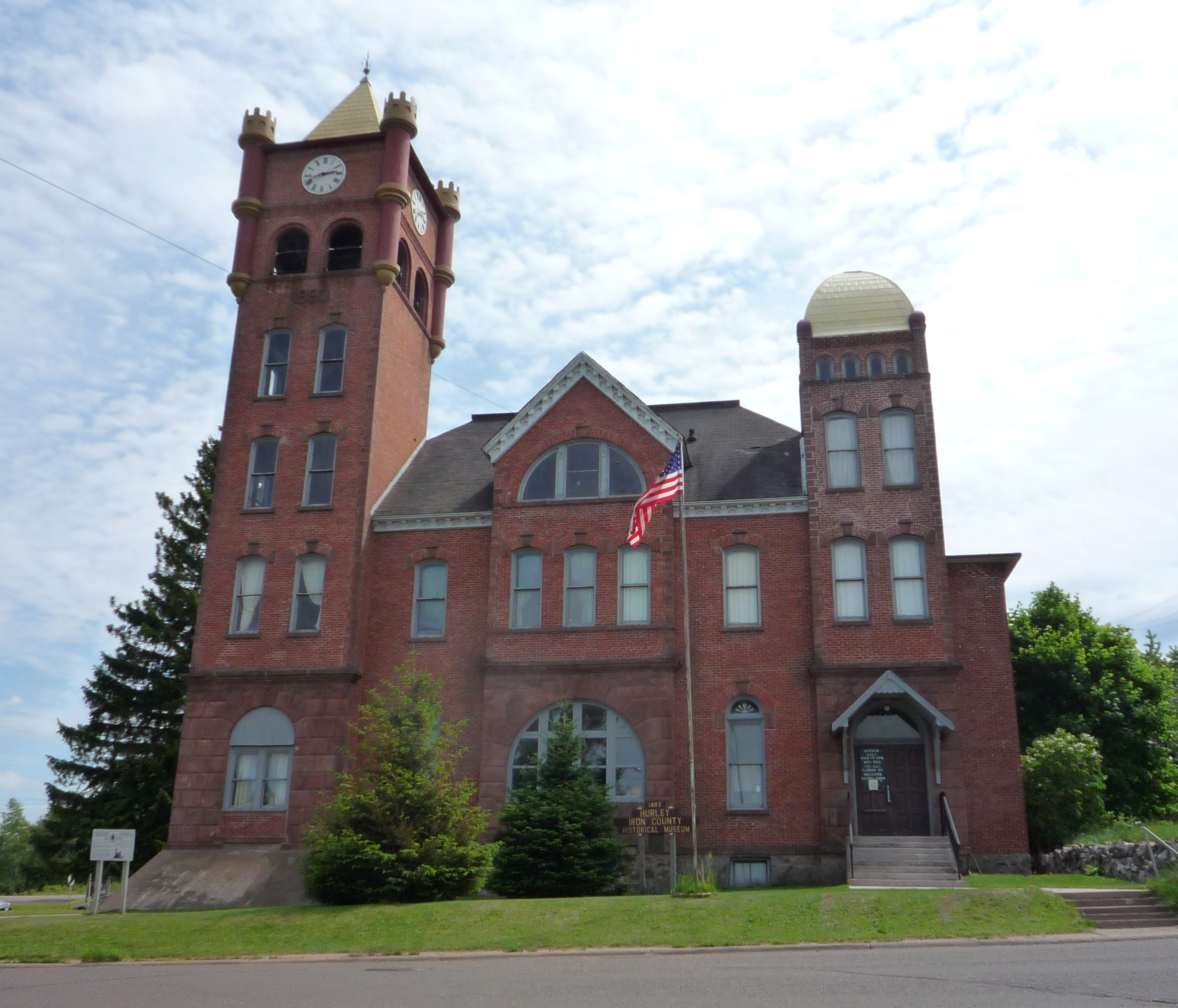

- Location within Wisconsin
- Interactive map showing the location for Old Iron County Courthouse
- Location: 303 Iron St., Hurley, Wisconsin
- Coordinates: 46°26′52″N 90°10′59″W
- Area: 0.5 acres (0.20 ha)
- Built: 1892-93
- Built by: Rinke and Means; Rinke and Carroll.
- Architect: L.H. Ruggles
- NRHP reference No.: 77000031
- Added to NRHP: July 26, 1977

The Old Iron County Courthouse, now the Iron County Historical Museum, at 303 Iron St. in Hurley in Iron County, Wisconsin, was built in 1892–1893. It was listed on the National Register of Historic Places in 1977.

== Building ==
The Old Courthouse is a two-story red pressed brick building with brownstone ornamentation, 83 by 69 feet (25 m × 21 m) in plan, in an eclectic style with Richardsonian Romanesque features and two towers, one a "castellated High Victorian" clock tower, the other capped by a dome. Designed by L.H. Ruggles, it was an unusually large and elaborate public building for Wisconsin at that time.

== History ==
The building was constructed in 1892–1893 as the town hall for the former town of Vaughn, which was then in Ashland County. Before its completion, the majority of the building was leased to the newly formed Iron County, and although under the lease terms the "court room" space was to be used primarily for meetings of the town council, it quickly became the county courthouse. The building originally also included the firehouse for the then village of Hurley; the central arched doorway in the main facade that accommodated fire-fighting equipment has been modified.

The clock tower has clocks on all four sides with a 1922 Seth Thomas clockworks, which replaced the 1893 original after lightning damage; electricity was installed for the purpose.

The Iron County Historical Society acquired the building in 1976 and restored it to house the Iron County Historical Museum.
