= Burton House (Hurley, Wisconsin) =

Former hotel in Hurley, Wisconsin, United States

Coordinates: 46°26′52.7″N 90°11′10.6″W

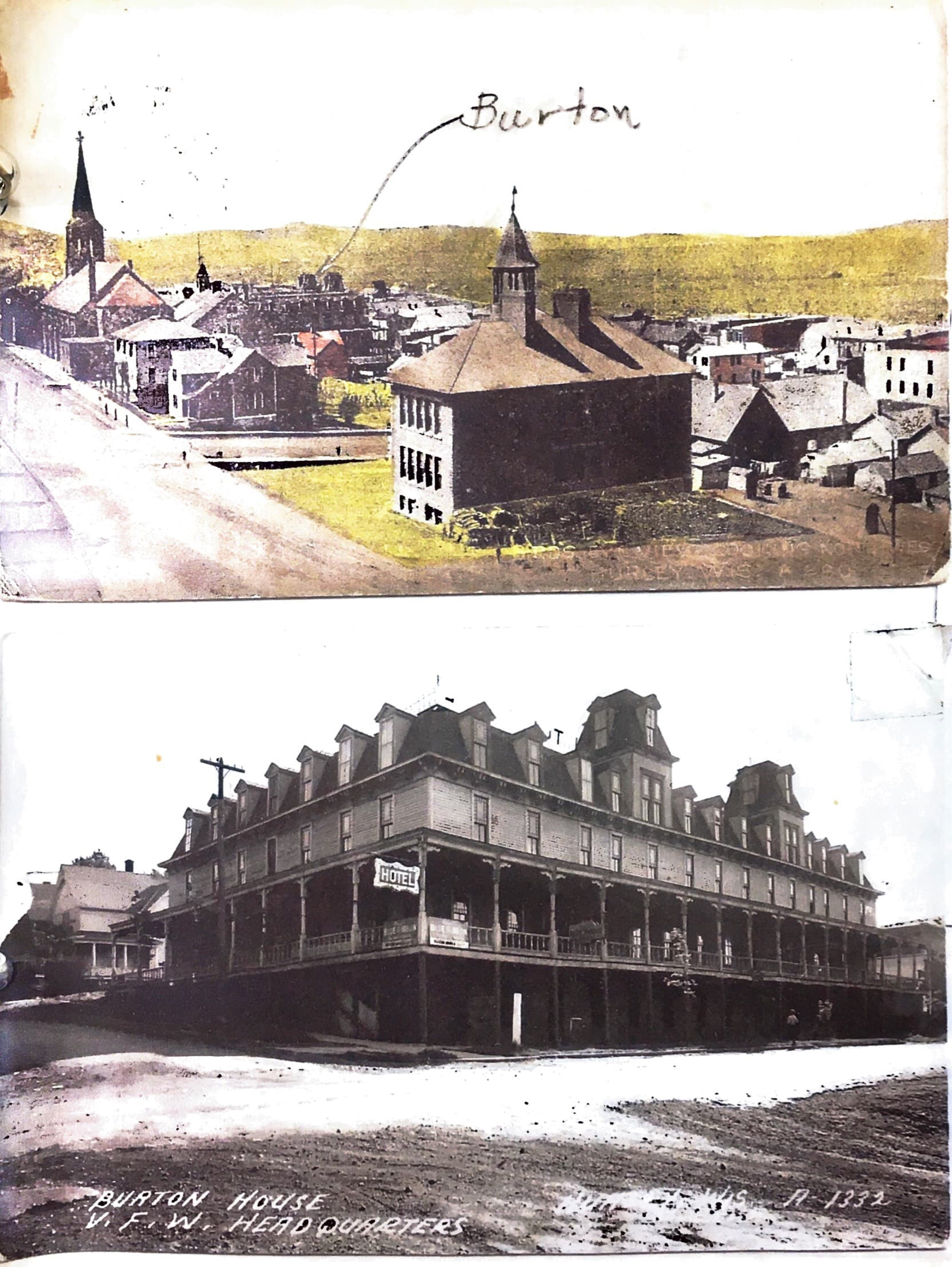

The Burton House was a celebrated hotel located in Hurley, Wisconsin during the city's heyday as a mining and logging community. The building was erected by mining speculator, John E. Burton and opened its doors in September 1886. The hotel was an immaculate structure, with a four-story frame, containing 100 elaborately decorated rooms, dining room, café, clubrooms and a ballroom. One of the Burton Houses's most famous guests was president Grover Cleveland who registered at the hotel on October 5, 1889. After years of decline, the Burton House burned to the ground on Feb. 2, 1947, as a result of an overheated stove in the first floor meeting room of the VFW.
