= John P. Varda =

American politician

John Patrick Varda (October 1, 1916 – February 20, 1993) was an American politician and jurist from the state of Wisconsin.

Varda was born in Hurley, Wisconsin, the son of Italian immigrants from the area of Turin, Italy. He received a bachelor's degree from the University of Wisconsin and a law degree from University of Wisconsin in 1940. John met his wife, Margaret in law school and afterwards they moved to Eagle River, Wisconsin and opened a law firm: Varda & Varda. In 1941, he served in the Wisconsin State Assembly as part of the Wisconsin Progressive Party. He resigned from the Wisconsin Assembly to join the United States Army during World War II. His wife Margaret was elected to the Wisconsin Assembly under the Progressive Party replacing her husband, but did not seek reelection and joined her husband in the military after her term. During and after the war, John served as the Deputy Military Governor in Aschaffenburg, Germany. The Vardas returned home from Europe upon the birth of their first child, John Duncan.

In 1950, the Vardas moved to Madison, Wisconsin where John took a job as general manager of the Wisconsin Motor Carrier Association. Varda became involved in commerce laws there, and eventually him and his sons went on to change laws regarding tractor-trailers and the Dormant Commerce Clause of the United States Constitution.

In 1981, John Patrick became Wisconsin Circuit Court judge for Iron County, Wisconsin and moved back to Hurley, Wisconsin. John remained in Hurley for the rest of his life, dying there in 1993 after suffering a heart attack a year earlier.

Varda had four sons: John Duncan Varda (attorney), Michael Varda (attorney), Anthony Varda (attorney), and Richard Varda (architect).
