= Marvin E. Dillman =

American politician

Marvin E. Dillman was a member of the Wisconsin State Assembly.

== Biography ==
Dillman was born on July 12, 1907, in Revillo, South Dakota. Dillman received his bachelor's degree from University of Illinois at Urbana–Champaign. He was an elementary school principal, worked with the United States Indian Service, and served on the Vilas County School Committee. Dillman owned a summer resort. He lived in Lac du Flambeau, Wisconsin.

== Career ==
Dillman was a member of the Assembly from 1955 to 1958. He was a Republican.
