= Charles L. Lacy =

American businessman and politician

Charles L. Lacy (July 4, 1885 – July 5, 1942) was an American businessman and politician.

Born in Sheffield, Indiana, Lacey was a sportsman and resort owner in Mercer, Wisconsin. He organized the Greater Wisconsin Recreation Association and was interested in conservation. In 1929, Lacey served in the Wisconsin State Assembly and was a Republican. Lacy died in Mercer, Wisconsin.
