= Hyman M. Mark =

American politician (1891–1961)

Hyman Maurice Mark (May 4, 1891 – February 20, 1961) was an American politician and member of the Wisconsin State Assembly from 1921 to 1924 as a Republican. A resident of Hurley, Wisconsin, Mark was Jewish.

Born in Duluth, Minnesota, he was educated in the public schools in Ironwood, Michigan. He was in the clothing and dry goods business and wholesale liquor, laundry, commission merchant, and scrap iron and metal business. Mark died at his home in Hurley after an illness of seven months. He was buried at Sharey Zedek Cemetery in Hurley.
