= Hurley, Wisconsin =

- City
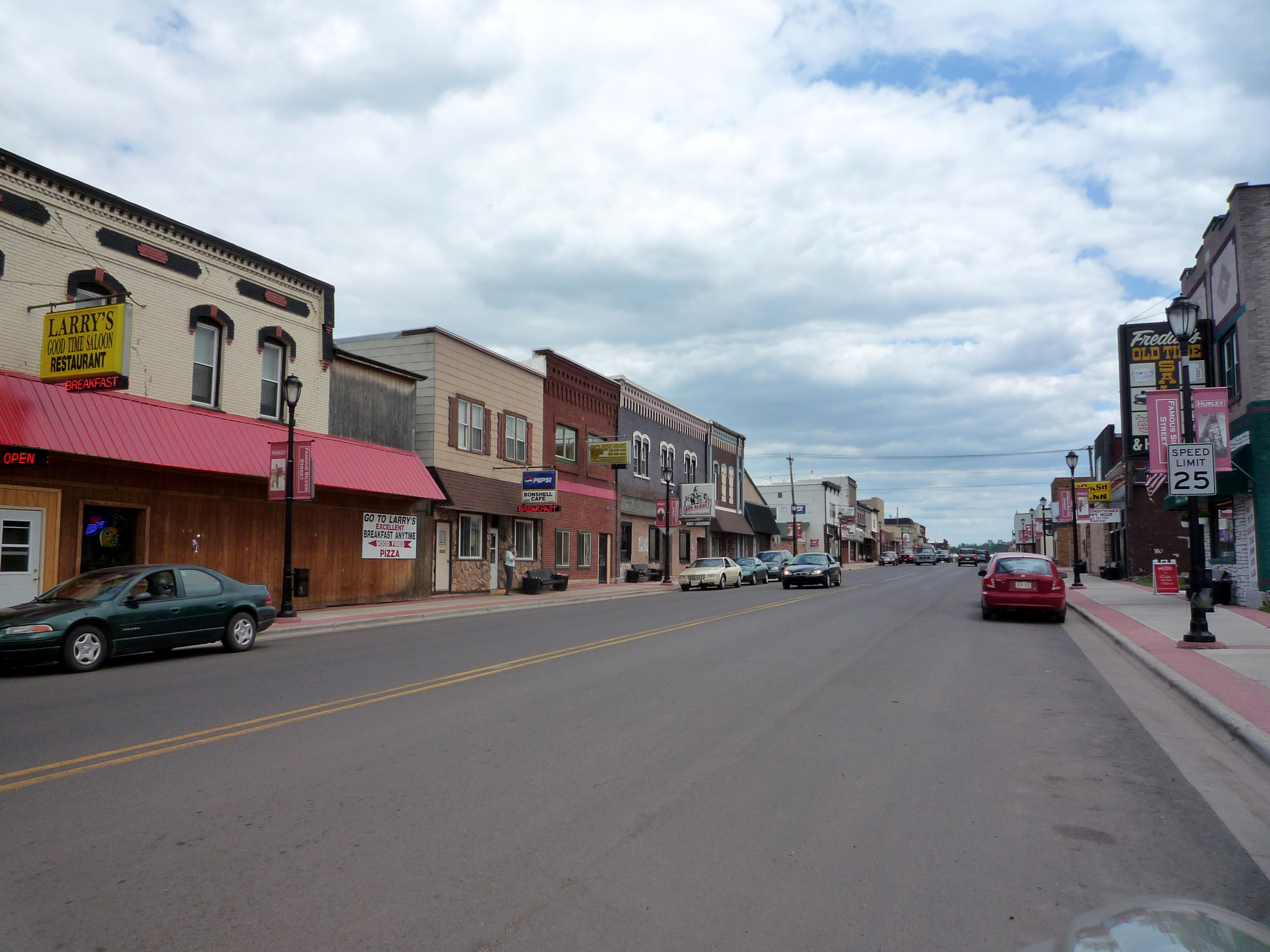
- Downtown Hurley

- Location of Hurley in Iron County, Wisconsin.

- Location within Wisconsin Location within the United States
- Coordinates: 46°27′1″N 90°11′23″W
- Country: United States
- State: Wisconsin
- County: Iron

Area
  - Total: 3.38 sq mi (8.76 km^{2})
  - Land: 3.23 sq mi (8.37 km^{2})
  - Water: 0.15 sq mi (0.39 km^{2})
- Elevation: 1,496 ft (456 m)

Population (2020)
  - Total: 1,558
  - Density: 444.3/sq mi (171.56/km^{2})
- Time zone: UTC-6 (Central (CST))
  - Summer (DST): UTC-5 (CDT)
- Zip Code: 54534
- Area codes: 715 & 534
- FIPS code: 55-36525
- GNIS feature ID: 1566822
- Website: https://cityofhurleywi.org

Hurley is a city in and the county seat of Iron County, Wisconsin, United States. The population was 1,558 at the 2020 census. It is located directly across the Montreal River from Ironwood, Michigan.

== History ==
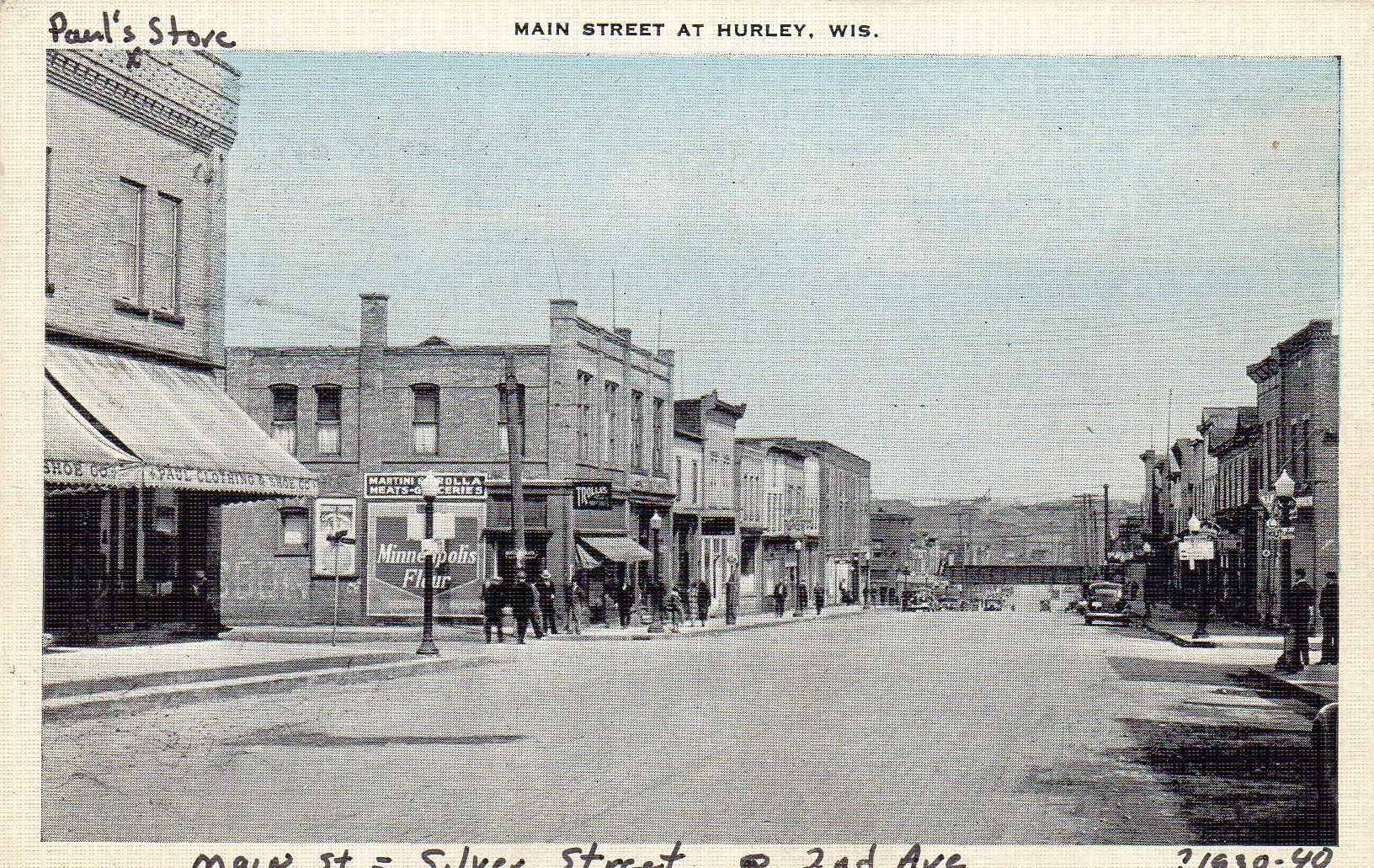
Silver Street at Second Avenue in Hurley c. 1930s

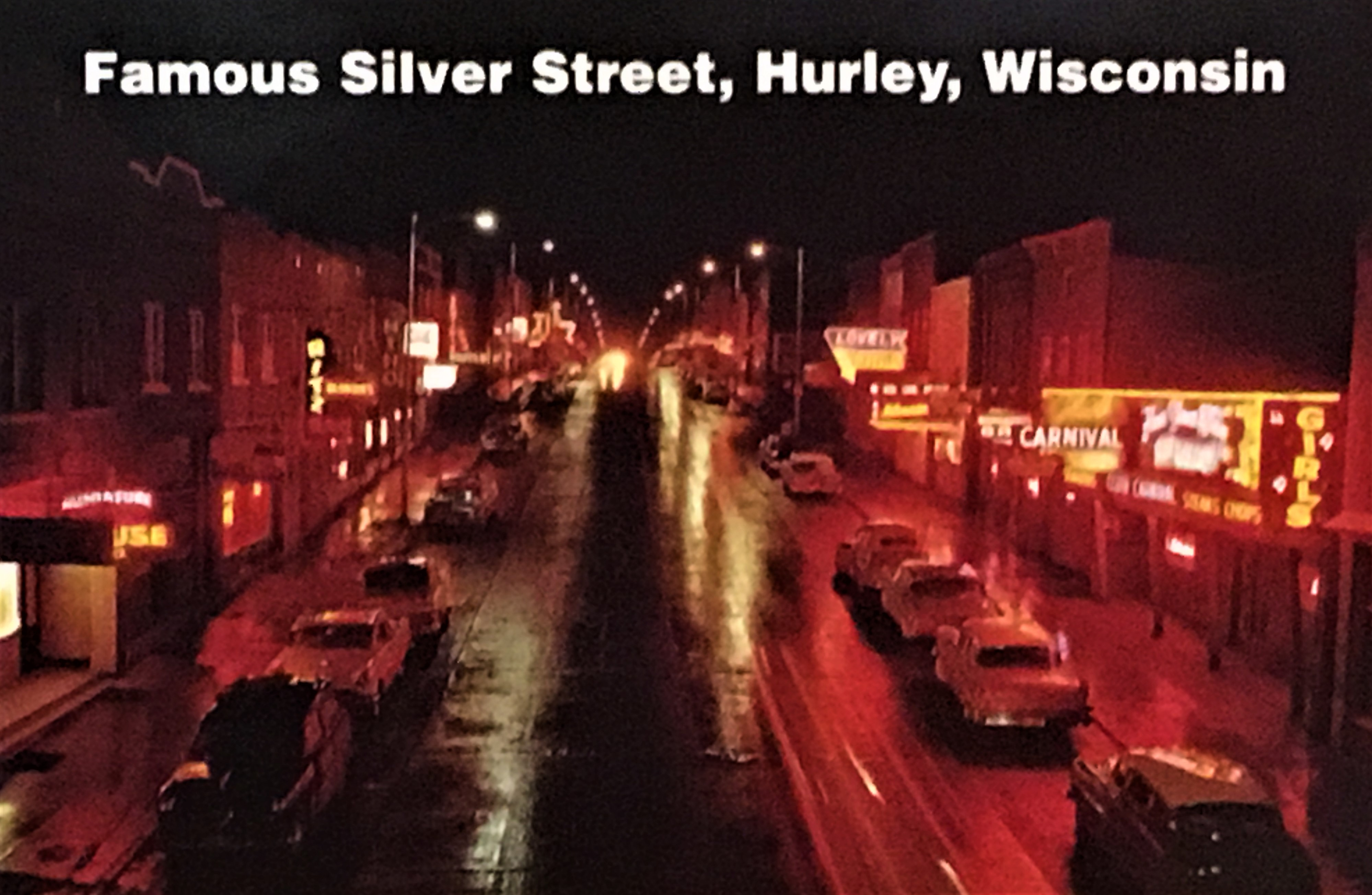
Silver Street on a 1950s postcard

Hurley is located on the Montreal River, the border between Wisconsin and the Upper Peninsula of Michigan. The city is on U.S. Highway 2 (US 2), and is the northern terminus of US 51, and is about 18 miles (29 km) south of Lake Superior. Hurley had its origins in the iron mining and lumbering booms of the 1880s. The city is located, along with adjacent Ironwood, Michigan, at the center of the Gogebic Range. The economy of Hurley, together with the city of Montreal in Wisconsin, and the cities of Ironwood, Bessemer and Wakefield in Michigan, was dependent upon the extraction of iron ore from the Gogebic (a/k/a Penokee) Range during the 19th and 20th centuries.

Hurley took its name from Canadian-born M. A. Hurley, a prominent attorney of Wausau who won a lawsuit for the Northern Chief Iron Company in 1884. The compensation for winning the lawsuit was that he asked for no fee, but only requested that the town involved in the case be named after him. M.A. Hurley held stock in the Northern Chief Iron Company. The full name "Glen Hurley" was used for one year, but in 1885, the first name was dropped and the community became known as Hurley. The first Plat Map of Glen Hurley was recorded in the Ashland County Register of Deeds by C.N. Nutter, surveyor for the Northern Chief Iron Company of Wausau, in December 1884.

Hurley did not become a city until April 1918. Previously, it was the Village of Hurley as part of the Town of Vaughn, one of only three original towns when Iron County was formed in 1893. Vaughn was named for Samuel S. Vaughn, pioneer resident of Ashland, for whom the Vaughn Public Library is named. When the City of Hurley was created, the town of Vaughn was dissolved and divided among the City of Hurley, the Town of Oma (Finnish for "Our Own"), the Town of Carey, and the Town of Kimball.

Henry Meade was the first mayor of Hurley.

John Ankers opened Hurley's first saloon and served as the first clerk for the Town of Vaughn, first Justice of the Peace, and first fire chief.

In early November 1887, ten people were killed in a fire that started in a three-story theater and spread to other structures.

The Gogebic Range Directory of 1888 states: "During the past summer, Hurley was twice visited by terrible fires. The first occurred of June 28 and the second on July 9. These destroyed almost the entire business portion of the city, and at first it was thought that they would prove a crushing blow to its prosperity, but later events have proven that they were blessings in disguise. The wonderful pluck and energy of its businessmen were fully demonstrated when they at once began the erection of fine brick buildings in the place of the wooden ones destroyed. The result has been that the burned portion has been rebuilt with brick and stone, making them nearly fireproof. And Silver Street is one that a much larger city could well be proud of."

Mines

The mines that contributed to the development of the city of Hurley and employed the miners included the ones listed below.

Montreal. The Montreal River Iron Mining Company was formed in Ashland, Wisconsin, in 1882 by several businessmen, to operate on lands leased from the Wisconsin Central Railroad. Captains Nathaniel D. Moore (1847-1898) and Edward Ryan directed the early development of the mine, in Section 33, sinking several test pits in hard hematite ore during the fall of 1882. Captain John R. Wood (1844-1913) was in charge in the fall of 1885. The Montreal mine began as an underground mine in 1887. It originally consisted of eighty acres to the southwest of the village of Montreal, and by the early 20th century it covered an area of almost two square miles. It was one of the deepest iron mines in North America and had shipped over forty-one million tons of iron ore by the time it closed on 10 August 1962.

The No. 5 shaft of the Montreal mine was one of the most impressive structures in Iron County, begun in 1921, and reached a depth of over three thousand feet. The steel headframe atop it was 165 feet tall and was removed soon after the mine closed in 1962.

Ottawa. The Ottawa mine was formed in 1901 from the former Odanah mine. It began in 1886 as the Puggawaugan; new owners took over in the summer of 1886, and the name was changed to Odanah. Three shafts were sunk in the ore and the Odanah became the first mine west of Hurley to make ore shipments. The property included the former Amazon mine, near the west branch of the Montreal River, on the northwest end of the village of Gile. The Ottawa mine is credited with shipments of just over 3,889,000 tons from 1886-1927. It was later included in the Montreal mine.

Odanah. The old Odanah No. 1 shaft dated back to 1886 and was in use at least as late as 1914, reaching a depth of about 1,130 feet.

Cary. To the east of the Ottawa was the Cary mine, which was composed of several old iron mines spread across Sections 26 and 276: the Superior, Bessemer (West Cary), and Kakagon (East Cary), and the Nimikon, which later became the Windsor in 1889. The Cary mine and its constituent parts shipped over eighteen million tons of iron ore between 1886-1965. The Cary "New A Shaft" was built in the early 1940s and reached a depth of close to 3,400 feet.

Germania. This mine was inside the city limits of Hurley and was the first iron ore shipping mine on the Wisconsin side of the Gogebic Iron Range. In 1882 the Hayes brothers, Jay Orley Hayes (1857-1948) and Everis Anson Hayes (1855-1942) had mining equipment moved to Mellen, Wisconsin, and the following year they secured a mining option on the Germania location at Hurley and hauled the machinery to the site. Captains Matt Fitzsimmons (1826-1896) and John Taylor (1830-1913) directed the development in 1885. The first ore shipment was delivered by rail to the new ore dock at Ashland, Wisconsin on 16 July 1885; this ore came from an open pit on the surface. The Germania is credited with shipments of just over 470,000 tons from 1885-1912. It had a high fatality rate compared to the relatively small production and was mined according to the advice of a spiritualist, namely, the mother of the Hayes brothers, Madame Hayes. The Germania was called the Harmony in the early 20th century.

Minnewawa. Samuel P. Snider and John W. Pence were principals of the Minnewawa Iron Mining Company and began work at this location on the west bank of the Montreal River in Hurley in 1886. Ore was struck nine feet beneath the surface on the east side of the property in May of that year, and three shafts were down by June of 1887. The Minnewawa combined with the Germania when the latter reopened in 1899, and shipped ore under the Harmony, Germania, and Ashland names. Shipments that can be directly attributed to the Minnewawa total almost 19,000 tons, some shipped as late as 1915.

=== Boundary dispute ===
Hurley was at the center of a boundary dispute between Michigan and Wisconsin, culminating in a United States Supreme Court case in 1926, confirming Hurley belonging to Wisconsin. The Montreal River was mapped in detail in 1841 by Lieutenant Thomas Jefferson Cram of the United States Land Office Department of Topography. Cram was assigned by Congress to survey the northeast boundary between Michigan and Wisconsin. This boundary had been originally outlined by Congress in 1834 on the basis of the faulty maps of the time which incorrectly showed both the Montreal and Menominee rivers originating from the Lac Vieux Desert in Vilas County. After a detailed survey, Cram located the headwaters of the Montreal 55 miles west of Lac Vieux Desert, and recommended the boundary line be run from the center of the lake to the headwaters of the Montreal. Michigan brought suit against Wisconsin to correct the boundary line between the two states. Michigan's claim included the City of Hurley and its valuable mineral deposits. Michigan's lawsuit, Michigan v. Wisconsin (270 U.S. 295, 1926), was dismissed by the US Supreme Court on the grounds that Wisconsin's long continued possession of the disputed property was acquiesced in by Michigan (P. 270, U.S. 301).

=== Prohibition ===
Hurley was a known gangster resort haven for mobsters in the twenties and thirties. According to an article in The Wisconsin Magazine of History, Hurley was the most infamous town in Wisconsin during Prohibition. "Hurley: a notorious northern Wisconsin city with a long history of vice. Prohibition agents staged massive raids on Hurley, but each time the saloonkeepers paid their fines and went back to their usual business. On December 27, 1926, federal agents padlocked twenty-nine Hurley saloons in a single day. A 1931 raid closed forty-two saloons, resulting in the arrest of sixty people- one out of every forty Hurley residents. In an economy dependent on revenues from drinking, gambling, and prostitution, local officers looked the other way and the city continued its business, with routine harassment by enforcement officials. By 1929, federal officials were afoot in Wisconsin to assess changing conditions. Prohibition investigator Frank Buckley was most aghast at what he found during a visit to Hurley. He commented that Hurley 'has the distinction of being the worst community in the State....Gambling, prostitution, bootlegging, and dope are about the chief occupations of the place. Saloons there function with barmaids who serve the dual capacity of soda dispenser and prostitute.'"

=== Radar Bomb Scoring site ===
In the early 1960s, the US Air Force established a Strategic Air Command (SAC) Radar Bomb Scoring site atop Norrie Hill in neighboring Ironwood, Michigan to track and score high altitude and treetop level simulated bomb runs by B-52s and B-47s on targets in the Hurley area. A monument is erected outside of Hurley to remember six crew members who were killed in two B-47 low level runs in 1961. The Radar Bomb Scoring site was moved to Charlevoix, Michigan in the mid-1960s.

=== Historic locations ===
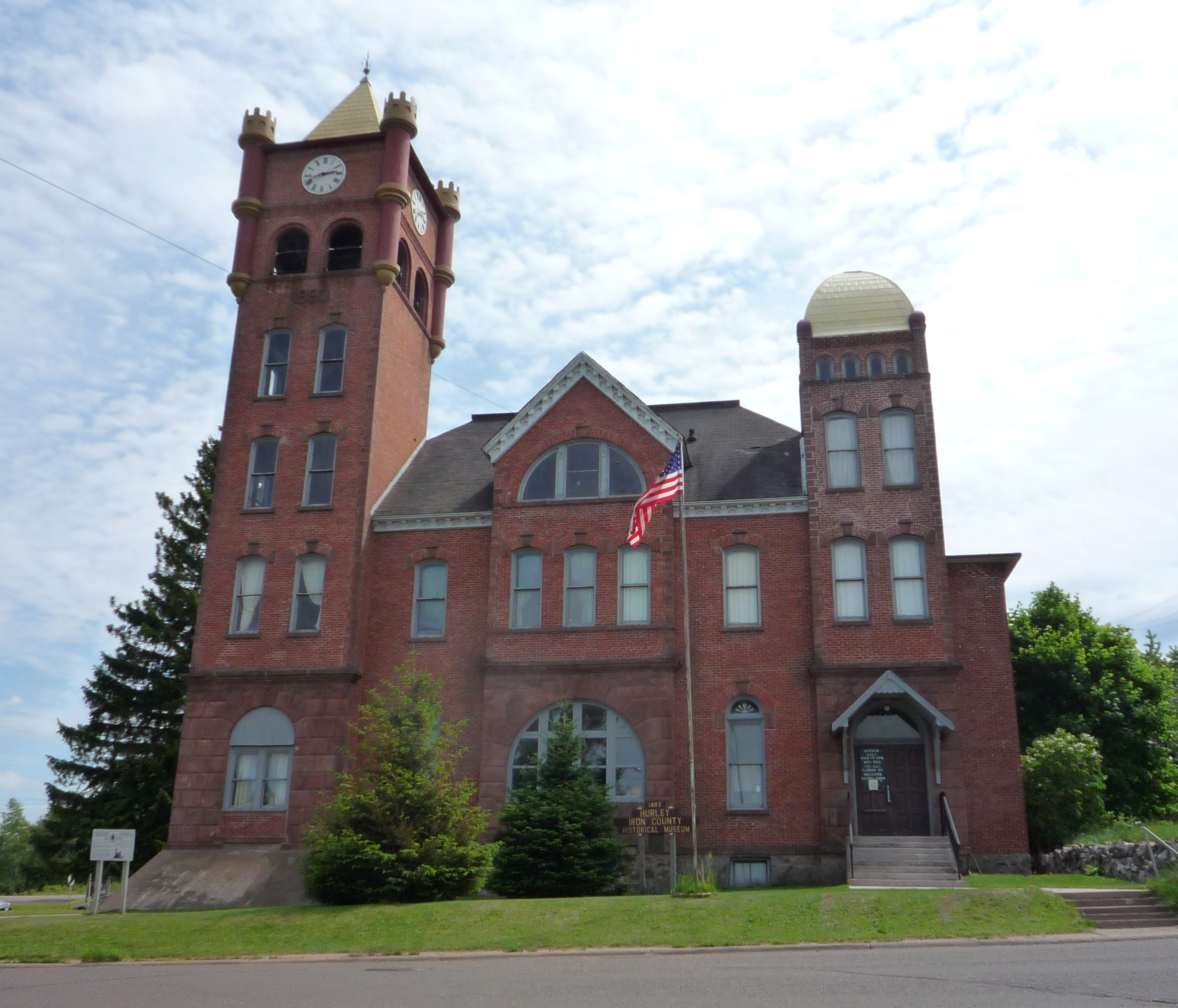
Old Iron County Courthouse

The Old Iron County Courthouse (now the Iron County Historical Museum) was designed in the Richardsonian-Romanesque style by architect L.H. Ruggles.The building was completed in 1893 by contractors Rinkle and Carroll at a cost of $27,303. The original clock in the tower was installed by Chicago jeweler J.J. Neuhavre. Lightning struck the clock tower in June 1922 and set the tower ablaze. The original clock was destroyed and was replaced by an electric Seth Thomas clock at a cost of $1,348. The building served as the county courthouse until 1975. In 1977, it was sold to the Iron County Historical Society for $1. It has been listed on the National Register for Historic Places since 1977. It was considered "architecturally significant in an area where there are few comparable buildings." The building currently houses the Iron County Historical Museum, which features three floors of exhibits and a weaving room where volunteers use looms to make rag rugs.

The Iron Exchange Bank of Hurley, was the oldest bank of the Gogebic Range. It was organized on November 26, 1885. Dr. J.C. Reynolds, the bank's first president, and his brother, W. S. Reynolds, the bank's first cashier, were the prime movers in the organization of the institution. Associated with them in the organization were John E. Burton, Alvin E. Tyler, Edward Ryan, Nathaniel J. Moore, James A. Wood, and Shepherd Homans, all men prominent in the mining industry in the area in the early days.

The first newspaper in Hurley was the Montreal River Miner which was first published on October 8, 1885. After absorbing the Iron County News in 1950 the two papers names were merged to form the Iron County Miner, which is still published as a weekly. La Nostra Terra ("Our Land"), an Italian language newspaper, was published in Hurley from 1904 to 1913, when it merged into the Iron County News.

The first hotel was located at the corner of Second Avenue and Silver Street in a log building, with James Guest as the first landlord.

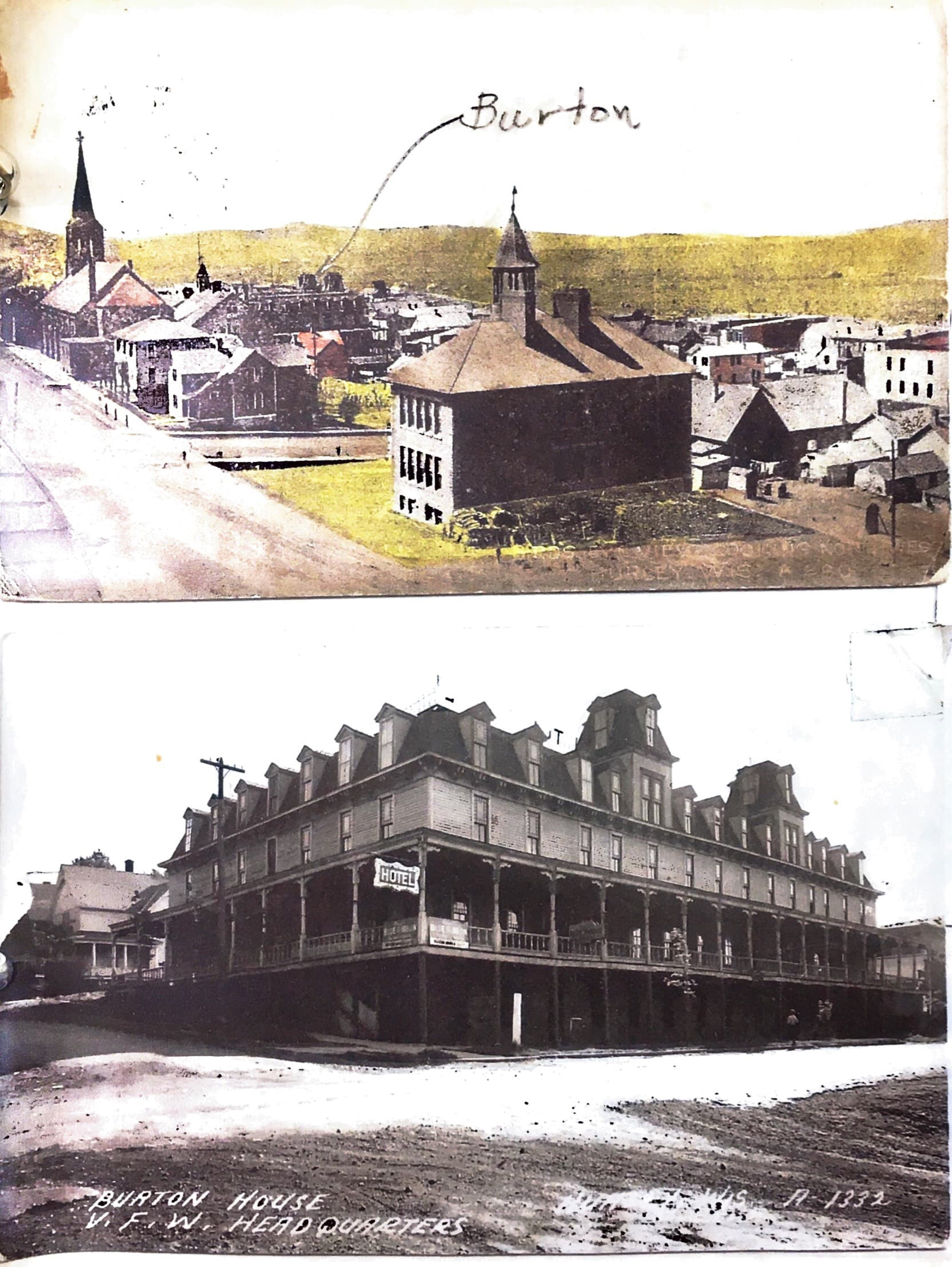
Burton House

The Burton House was an immense four-story frame hostelry, which was a famous gathering place in the latter part of the 19th century. John E. Burton, of Lake Geneva, erected the building in 1886. A mining speculator, his original wealth came from the iron range. Later he established offices in New York City and bought up other vast mining interests in Mexico and South America. The Burton Hotel contained 100 rooms, a ballroom, dining room, café, and clubrooms, all highly decorated and furnished with the best of the woodworkers' art of the time, and equipped with the best furniture. The Burton Hotel cost $35,000 to construct, and the furniture cost Burton $10,000. Many noteworthy people stayed at the Burton House: including Benjamin Harrison, in 1888, during his campaign for president; the actress Sarah Bernhardt, who made at least three appearances in Hurley; the financier Colgate Hoyt, nephew of James Boorman Colgate, son of the British-American industrialist, Charles Colgate; the actor Edwin Booth (brother of John Wilkes Booth); and author and playwright Edna Ferber. Grover Cleveland registered at the Burton House Saturday, October 5, 1889. By that time he had already served one term as president of the United States. In 1889 when he was in Hurley, he was a New York lawyer and businessman. Cleveland was elected to the presidency again in 1892. The Burton House burned to the ground on February 2, 1947, as the result of an over-heated stove on the first floor VFW meeting room.

== Geography ==
Hurley is located at 46°27′1″N 90°11′23″W (46.450361, -90.189802).

According to the United States Census Bureau, the city has a total area of 3.58 square miles (9.27 km^{2}), of which 3.42 square miles (8.86 km^{2}) is land and 0.16 square miles (0.41 km^{2}) is water.

It is across the state border and the Montreal River from Ironwood, Michigan, both cities located on the Gogebic Range.

=== Climate ===
Hurley has a cool humid continental climate (Köppen Dfb), with long, cold winters and short, mild summers. In an average year the temperature drops below 32 °F (0 °C) on 192 days, and below 0 °F (-17.8 °C) on 40 days. Hurley is also one of the snowiest cities in the United States with an average of over 160 inches of snow per year due to lake-effect snow from nearby Lake Superior.

Climate data for Hurley, Wisconsin (1991–2020 normals, extremes 1987–present)
Month	Jan	Feb	Mar	Apr	May	Jun	Jul	Aug	Sep	Oct	Nov	Dec	Year
Record high °F (°C)	50 (10)	59 (15)	78 (26)	84 (29)	93 (34)	97 (36)	98 (37)	97 (36)	92 (33)	87 (31)	72 (22)	59 (15)	98 (37)
Mean maximum °F (°C)	39.6 (4.2)	46.2 (7.9)	58.5 (14.7)	71.7 (22.1)	83.5 (28.6)	88.3 (31.3)	88.5 (31.4)	88.0 (31.1)	83.5 (28.6)	75.5 (24.2)	57.3 (14.1)	43.4 (6.3)	90.9 (32.7)
Mean daily maximum °F (°C)	20.3 (−6.5)	24.9 (−3.9)	36.0 (2.2)	48.8 (9.3)	63.5 (17.5)	73.3 (22.9)	77.1 (25.1)	75.5 (24.2)	67.3 (19.6)	52.9 (11.6)	37.6 (3.1)	25.7 (−3.5)	50.2 (10.1)
Daily mean °F (°C)	11.8 (−11.2)	14.6 (−9.7)	25.4 (−3.7)	38.4 (3.6)	52.3 (11.3)	62.2 (16.8)	66.5 (19.2)	64.8 (18.2)	56.9 (13.8)	43.7 (6.5)	30.2 (−1.0)	18.3 (−7.6)	40.4 (4.7)
Mean daily minimum °F (°C)	3.2 (−16.0)	4.3 (−15.4)	14.8 (−9.6)	28.0 (−2.2)	41.1 (5.1)	51.1 (10.6)	55.9 (13.3)	54.2 (12.3)	46.5 (8.1)	34.4 (1.3)	22.8 (−5.1)	10.9 (−11.7)	30.6 (−0.8)
Mean minimum °F (°C)	−18.7 (−28.2)	−18.6 (−28.1)	−11.7 (−24.3)	10.4 (−12.0)	26.9 (−2.8)	35.2 (1.8)	44.3 (6.8)	41.6 (5.3)	31.8 (−0.1)	21.3 (−5.9)	3.4 (−15.9)	−11.7 (−24.3)	−23.0 (−30.6)
Record low °F (°C)	−31 (−35)	−36 (−38)	−31 (−35)	−12 (−24)	20 (−7)	24 (−4)	35 (2)	33 (1)	26 (−3)	5 (−15)	−10 (−23)	−36 (−38)	−36 (−38)
Average precipitation inches (mm)	2.31 (59)	1.69 (43)	1.96 (50)	2.90 (74)	3.56 (90)	3.81 (97)	4.07 (103)	3.72 (94)	3.76 (96)	3.94 (100)	3.03 (77)	2.61 (66)	37.36 (949)
Average snowfall inches (cm)	38.8 (99)	26.2 (67)	18.2 (46)	9.4 (24)	1.4 (3.6)	0.0 (0.0)	0.0 (0.0)	0.0 (0.0)	0.2 (0.51)	4.6 (12)	21.5 (55)	34.7 (88)	155.0 (394)
Average precipitation days (≥ 0.01 in)	14.0	9.6	8.7	9.8	11.3	11.4	11.1	10.1	12.2	12.9	11.5	13.1	135.7
Average snowy days (≥ 0.1 in)	13.4	8.8	6.2	3.5	0.4	0.0	0.0	0.0	0.0	1.6	7.0	11.2	52.1
Source: NOAA

== Demographics ==
Historical population
Census	Pop.	Note	%±
1900	2,440		—
1910	2,934		20.2%
1920	3,188		8.7%
1930	3,264		2.4%
1940	3,375		3.4%
1950	3,034		−10.1%
1960	2,763		−8.9%
1970	2,418		−12.5%
1980	2,015		−16.7%
1990	1,782		−11.6%
2000	1,818		2.0%
2010	1,547		−14.9%
2020	1,558		0.7%
U.S. Decennial Census

=== 2010 census ===
As of the census of 2010, there were 1,547 people, 771 households, and 360 families residing in the city. The population density was 452.3 inhabitants per square mile (174.6/km^{2}). There were 1,032 housing units at an average density of 301.8 per square mile (116.5/km^{2}). The racial makeup of the city was 97.5% White, 0.1% African American, 0.8% Native American, 0.2% Asian, 0.1% from other races, and 1.2% from two or more races. Hispanic or Latino of any race were 0.8% of the population.

There were 771 households, of which 20.6% had children under the age of 18 living with them, 31.1% were married couples living together, 10.0% had a female householder with no husband present, 5.6% had a male householder with no wife present, and 53.3% were non-families. 47.1% of all households were made up of individuals, and 23.1% had someone living alone who was 65 years of age or older. The average household size was 1.89 and the average family size was 2.66.

The median age in the city was 49 years. 16.2% of residents were under the age of 18; 6.9% were between the ages of 18 and 24; 20.5% were from 25 to 44; 30.3% were from 45 to 64; and 26.1% were 65 years of age or older. The gender makeup of the city was 47.3% male and 52.7% female.

=== 2000 census ===
As of the census of 2000, there were 1,818 people, 830 households, and 458 families residing in the city. The population density was 577.3 people per square mile (222.8/km^{2}). There were 1,025 housing units at an average density of 325.5 per square mile (125.6/km^{2}). The racial makeup of the city was 97.36% Caucasian, 0.06% African American, 1.38% Native American, 0.11% Asian, 0.17% Pacific Islander, and 0.94% from two or more races. Hispanic or Latino of any race were 0.88% of the population. 30.3% were of Italian, 20.4% Finnish, 9.7% German and 9.3% Polish ancestry.

There were 830 households, out of which 20.6% had children under the age of 18 living with them, 41.7% were married couples living together, 9.3% had a female householder with no husband present, and 44.8% were non-families. 39.9% of all households were made up of individuals, and 20.8% had someone living alone who was 65 years of age or older. The average household size was 2.06 and the average family size was 2.72.

In the city, the population was spread out, with 18.2% under the age of 18, 8.6% from 18 to 24, 27.0% from 25 to 44, 19.7% from 45 to 64, and 26.6% who were 65 years of age or older. The median age was 43 years. For every 100 females, there were 90.2 males. For every 100 females age 18 and over, there were 86.2 males.

The median income for a household in the city was $24,821, and the median income for a family was $33,000. Males had a median income of $27,717 versus $17,750 for females. The per capita income for the city was $14,554. About 11.0% of families and 14.7% of the population were below the poverty line, including 18.6% of those under age 18 and 15.1% of those age 65 or over.

== Recreation and tourism ==
The western terminus of the Iron Belle Trail, a non motorized path, begins in Hurley. The trail runs along the former Soo Line Railroad tracks from Hurley to Ramsay, Michigan. Hurley is located near numerous waterfalls. The SISU Cross Country Ski Race is held each January in neighboring Ironwood, Michigan. The Paavo Nurmi Marathon, one of the first US marathons, is held in Hurley the second Saturday of every August.

Hurley commemorates its Italian heritage at the annual Festivale de Italiano, held every Labor Day weekend.

The National Finnish American Festival Cultural Center (NFAF) is located on US 2, near US 51 south. Viola Turpeninen Day, held annually in the summer, commemorates the legendary Finnish-American accordionist and singer. Other events take place on Mothers' day and Juhannus as well as throughout the year. The NFAF museum is open from April through December.

Hurley is also known for its ATV Hurley Rally held on Memorial Day weekend, a Pumpkin ATV rally held the second weekend of October, and the Red Light Snowmobile Rally. Both attract thousands of visitors to the area each year.

Riccelli Park is located in Hurley. The park provides picnic and playground areas, as well as the Nestor Laspa pavilion for gatherings. The Felix Patritto baseball field is located adjacent to Riccelli Park.

== Government ==
Hurley is the county seat of Iron County. The current mayor is Joanne Lundgren Bruneau.

Presidential elections results

Presidential elections results
Year	Republican	Democratic	Third parties
2024	61.3% 497	37.4% 303	1.4% 11
2020	57.3% 468	41.7% 341	1.0% 8
2016	55.9% 396	39.6% 281	4.5% 32
2012	39.3% 286	59.2% 431	1.5% 11
2008	33.3% 252	65.6% 496	1.1% 8
2004	40.6% 362	58.7% 523	0.7% 6
2000	44.9% 367	52.2% 427	2.9% 24

== Education ==
Gogebic Community College, a two-year public community college, is located in adjacent Ironwood, Michigan. It was founded in 1932 and has a student body of approximately 1,000.

The Hurley K-12 School is located just outside of Hurley in the Town of Kimball. It was built in 1991 and serves students from northern Iron County in grades kindergarten through 12. Approximately 550 students are enrolled as of the 2021–2022 school year.

== Media ==
WHRY-AM and WUPM-FM are the two local radio stations, along with stations from Ironwood, Michigan.

== Transportation ==
- US 2 runs west to Ashland, Wisconsin and Duluth, Minnesota, intersecting US 51 at the Michigan–Wisconsin border at Ironwood and then goes east to Iron Mountain.
- US 51 terminates at Hurley. Southbound, US 51 routes to Wausau, Wisconsin; where it intersects with Interstate 39.
- WIS 77 starts just at the state line in Hurley and travels southwest.

Intercity bus service to the city is provided by Indian Trails.

Gogebic-Iron County Airport offers commercial air service.

Hurley was served by the Chicago & North Western Flambeau Line with the Flambeau 400 train between Chicago and Ashland, and the Soo Line Railroad [formerly Minneapolis, St. Paul, and Sault Ste. Marie Railroad] between Minneapolis and Bessemer. The Duluth, South Shore and Atlantic Railway Line (now Canadian National Railway) skirted Hurley a few miles to the north. This line originally ran from Superior to Sault Ste Marie.

== Notable people ==
- Paul Alfonsi, Wisconsin State Representative and Speaker of the Wisconsin State Assembly
- Karen Borca, American avant-garde jazz and free jazz bassoonist
- Len Calligaro, football player
- Ralph Capone, former Public Enemy No. 3 and older brother to gangster Al Capone
- Arthur A. Cirilli, Wisconsin State Senator and Douglas County Circuit Court Judge
- Chester P. Emunson, Michigan State Representative
- C.L. Harrington, Superintendent of Wisconsin State Forests and Parks, nature photographer
- Everis A. Hayes, U.S. Representative from California
- Leon L. Lewis, attorney and co-founder of the Anti-Defamation League
- Sarah McNeel Lockwood, novelist, notable work Fistful of Stars
- Hyman M. Mark, Wisconsin State Representative
- Linton McNeel, pioneer attorney; practiced law in Hurley from 1886 until 1892–1893,
- Lotta Morgan, born Laura Whitley (some variations include Whiting or Whittlesay) Famed Hurley character, mistress, purported escort and unsolved murder victim.
- Alvin O'Konski, U.S. Representative
- Frank Olson, bio-weaponeer who died under suspicious circumstances
- Albert L. Osborn, Wisconsin State Representative
- Nell Ziff Pekarsky, President of Junior Hadassah, 1938–1941; assistant to Rabbi Mordechai Kaplan, founder of the Reconstructionist Movement
- Alex J. Raineri, Wisconsin State Representative and Iron County Circuit Court Judge, 1978–1980
- Hugh Fay [H.F.] Ringo, Montreal Mining Company physician; member, Committee for the Prevention of Silicosis through Medical Control
- Philip Romiti, Dean, DePaul University Law School; Presiding Judge in Black Panther and Lindquist cases, Cook County, Illinois
- Frank Rooney, baseball player
- Robert (Bob) Sohl, Olympic bronze medal-winning swimmer in 1948
- Joseph Sullivan, an FBI major case inspector who led the investigation into the murders of Chaney, Goodman, and Schwerner in 1964, depicted in the movie Mississippi Burning
- Richard C. Trembath, Wisconsin State Representative and Iron County Judge
- John P. Varda, Wisconsin State Representative and Iron County Judge.
- Sherman W. Wade, Wisconsin State Senator
- Earl W. Warren, Wisconsin State Representative
- William Whiteside, Wisconsin State Representative and Iron County Sheriff and Treasurer
- Arne Wicklund, Wisconsin State Representative and Iron County Judge
- Paul Zarzyski, Cowboy poet and educator

== In popular culture ==
A fictionalized version of Hurley as well as the famed character and murder victim Lotta (Lottie) Morgan was the subject of Edna Ferber's 1934 novel Come and Get It. Ferber did most of her research for the novel while staying at Hurley's Burton House hotel.

In 1954, Lewis C. Reimann published the book Hurley - Still No Angel, in which he claimed that crime and corruption were still prevalent in the town.

Ralph Capone, the older brother of Al Capone, died in Hurley in 1974.
