= Montreal, Wisconsin =

- City
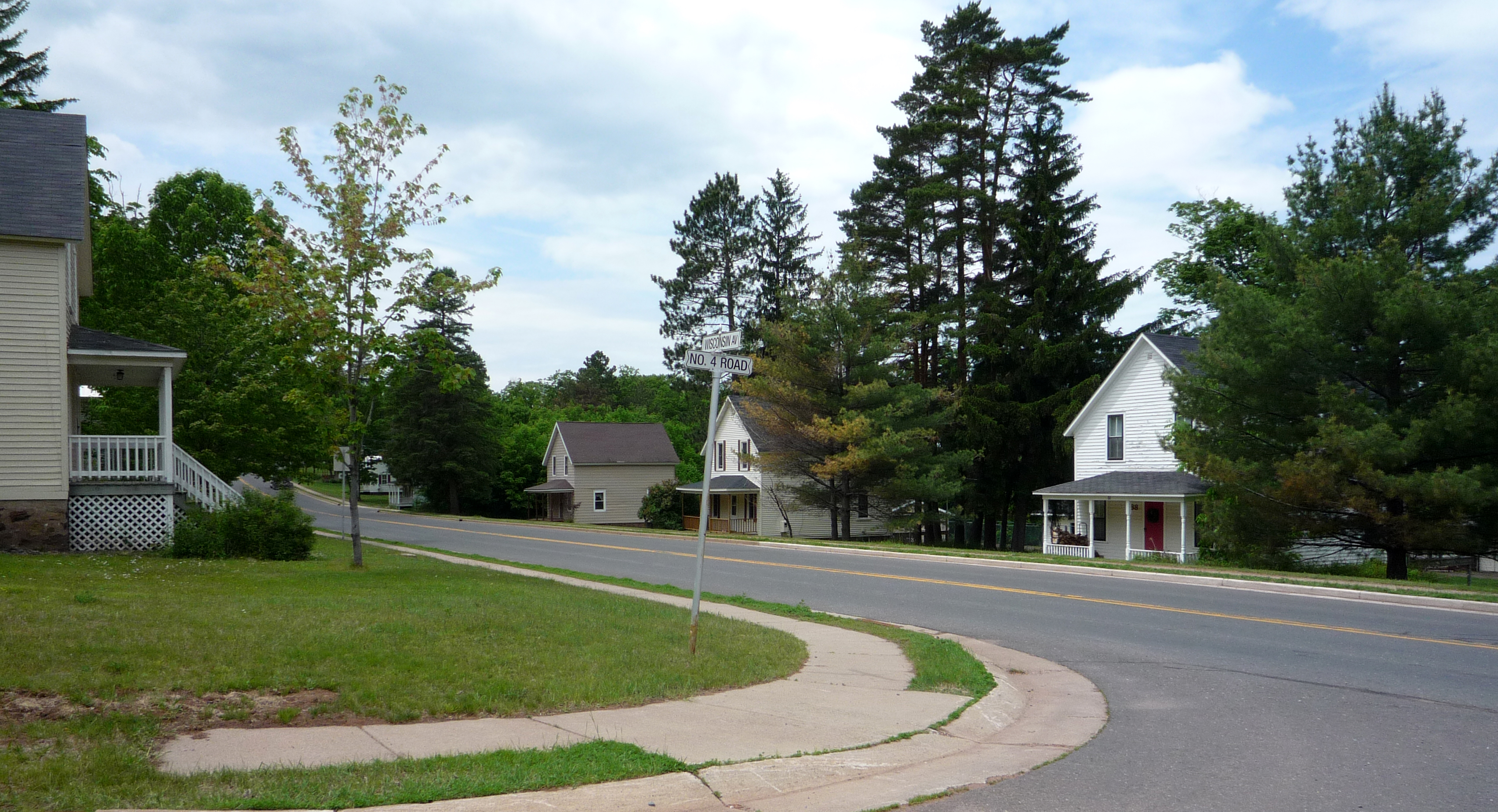
- Montreal Company Location Historic District

- Location of Montreal in Iron County, Wisconsin.

- Location within Wisconsin Location within the United States
- Coordinates: 46°25′45″N 90°14′20″W
- Country: United States
- State: Wisconsin
- County: Iron

Area
  - Total: 2.24 sq mi (5.79 km^{2})
  - Land: 2.22 sq mi (5.75 km^{2})
  - Water: 0.015 sq mi (0.04 km^{2})
- Elevation: 1,598 ft (487 m)

Population (2020)
  - Total: 801
  - Density: 361/sq mi (139/km^{2})
- Time zone: UTC-6 (Central (CST))
  - Summer (DST): UTC-5 (CDT)
- Zipcode: 54550
- Area codes: 715 & 534
- FIPS code: 55-54075
- GNIS feature ID: 1569683
- Website: montrealwis.com

Montreal is a city in Iron County, Wisconsin, United States. The population was 801 at the 2020 census. The neighborhood of Gile is part of the city; however, it still has its own post office and ZIP code: 54550. Like Gile, the former unincorporated community of Germania has also been annexed by the city.

== History ==
Montreal was originally incorporated as the Village of Hamilton, on or about 1917, and was the first village formed in Iron County.

Montreal, as it was named upon its incorporation as a city on April 1, 1924, was named for the Montreal Mining Company, which had several iron ore mines in the area during the late 1800s, itself named for the nearby Montreal River. During the early 1900s, miners settled near the mine shaft and leased the land from the mining company. However, in 1918, in order to retain workers, the company initiated a program that rented pre-fabricated homes to miners. The Montreal Company Location Historic District, which includes several of these company town houses, was added to the National Register of Historic Places in 1980 as a national example of industrial community planning. The ore deposits left from Montreal's mining days can still be seen from Wisconsin Highway 77.

An area iron mine operated by Oglebay Norton Corporation was, at the time of its closing in 1962, the deepest iron mine in the world, with a vertical depth of 4,335 feet (1,321 m).

== Neighborhoods ==
=== Gile ===
Gile is a neighborhood of Montreal which was once its own unincorporated community. It was named for Gordon H. Gile, a local mine owner. The community originally developed as a sawmill village. Even though it is part of Montreal, Gile has its own post office with ZIP code: 54525. Gile is located 0.75 miles (1.21 km) to the east-southeast of Montreal, along the Gile Flowage, a shallow lake formed by a dam on the West Fork of the Montreal River.

=== Germania ===
Germania is another neighborhood of Montreal. At one time, it was its own rail depot/unincorporated community along the railroad line that used to pass through Montreal.

== Geography ==
Montreal is located at 46°25′45″N 90°14′20″W (46.429081, -90.238845).

According to the United States Census Bureau, the city has a total area of 2.24 square miles (5.80 km^{2}), of which 2.23 square miles (5.78 km^{2}) is land and 0.01 square miles (0.03 km^{2}) is water.

== Demographics ==
Historical population
Census	Pop.	Note	%±
1920	1,890		—
1930	1,819		−3.8%
1940	1,700		−6.5%
1950	1,439		−15.4%
1960	1,361		−5.4%
1970	877		−35.6%
1980	887		1.1%
1990	838		−5.5%
2000	838		0.0%
2010	807		−3.7%
2020	801		−0.7%
U.S. Decennial Census

=== 2010 census ===
As of the census of 2010, there were 807 people, 364 households, and 228 families residing in the city. The population density was 361.9 inhabitants per square mile (139.7/km^{2}). There were 479 housing units at an average density of 214.8 per square mile (82.9/km^{2}). The racial makeup of the city was 96.7% White, 1.2% Native American, 0.2% Asian, 1.4% from other races, and 0.5% from two or more races. Hispanic or Latino of any race were 1.6% of the population.

There were 364 households, of which 30.5% had children under the age of 18 living with them, 45.9% were married couples living together, 8.5% had a female householder with no husband present, 8.2% had a male householder with no wife present, and 37.4% were non-families. 30.5% of all households were made up of individuals, and 10.5% had someone living alone who was 65 years of age or older. The average household size was 2.22 and the average family size was 2.77.

The median age in the city was 43.4 years. 23% of residents were under the age of 18; 5.9% were between the ages of 18 and 24; 24% were from 25 to 44; 33.9% were from 45 to 64; and 13.1% were 65 years of age or older. The gender makeup of the city was 50.6% male and 49.4% female.

=== 2000 census ===
As of the census of 2000, there were 838 people, 378 households, and 230 families residing in the city. The population density was 373.9 people per square mile (144.4/km^{2}). There were 487 housing units at an average density of 217.3 per square mile (83.9/km^{2}). The racial makeup of the city was 98.69% White, 0.36% Native American, 0.12% Asian, and 0.84% from two or more races. Hispanic or Latino of any race were 0.72% of the population. 28.3% were of Italian, 16.1% Finnish, 12.4% Polish and 10.8% German ancestry according to Census 2000.

There were 378 households, out of which 28.8% had children under the age of 18 living with them, 49.2% were married couples living together, 8.7% had a female householder with no husband present, and 38.9% were non-families. 34.4% of all households were made up of individuals, and 16.4% had someone living alone who was 65 years of age or older. The average household size was 2.22 and the average family size was 2.86.

In the city, the population was spread out, with 24.6% under the age of 18, 6.1% from 18 to 24, 27.8% from 25 to 44, 23.3% from 45 to 64, and 18.3% who were 65 years of age or older. The median age was 40 years. For every 100 females, there were 87.5 males. For every 100 females age 18 and over, there were 93.3 males.

The median income for a household in the city was $29,219, and the median income for a family was $35,625. Males had a median income of $28,625 versus $19,375 for females. The per capita income for the city was $17,097. About 5.8% of families and 7.6% of the population were below the poverty line, including 11.1% of those under age 18 and 9.0% of those age 65 or over.

== Notable residents ==
- Dom Moselle, NFL player, was born in Gile.
- Joseph Sullivan, FBI agent, was born in Montreal.
- Richard C. Trembath, Wisconsin legislator and jurist, was born in Montreal.
- Arne H. Wicklund, Wisconsin legislator and jurist, was born in Gile.

== Images ==
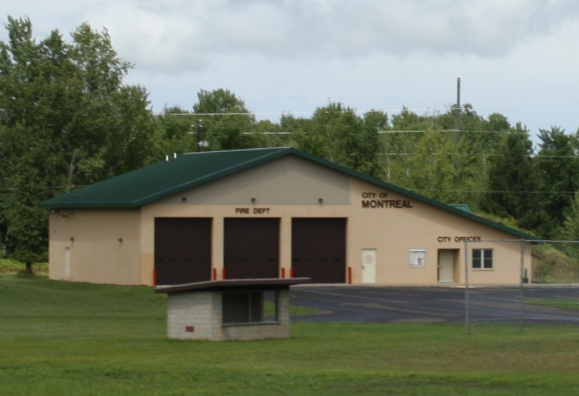
City offices and fire department

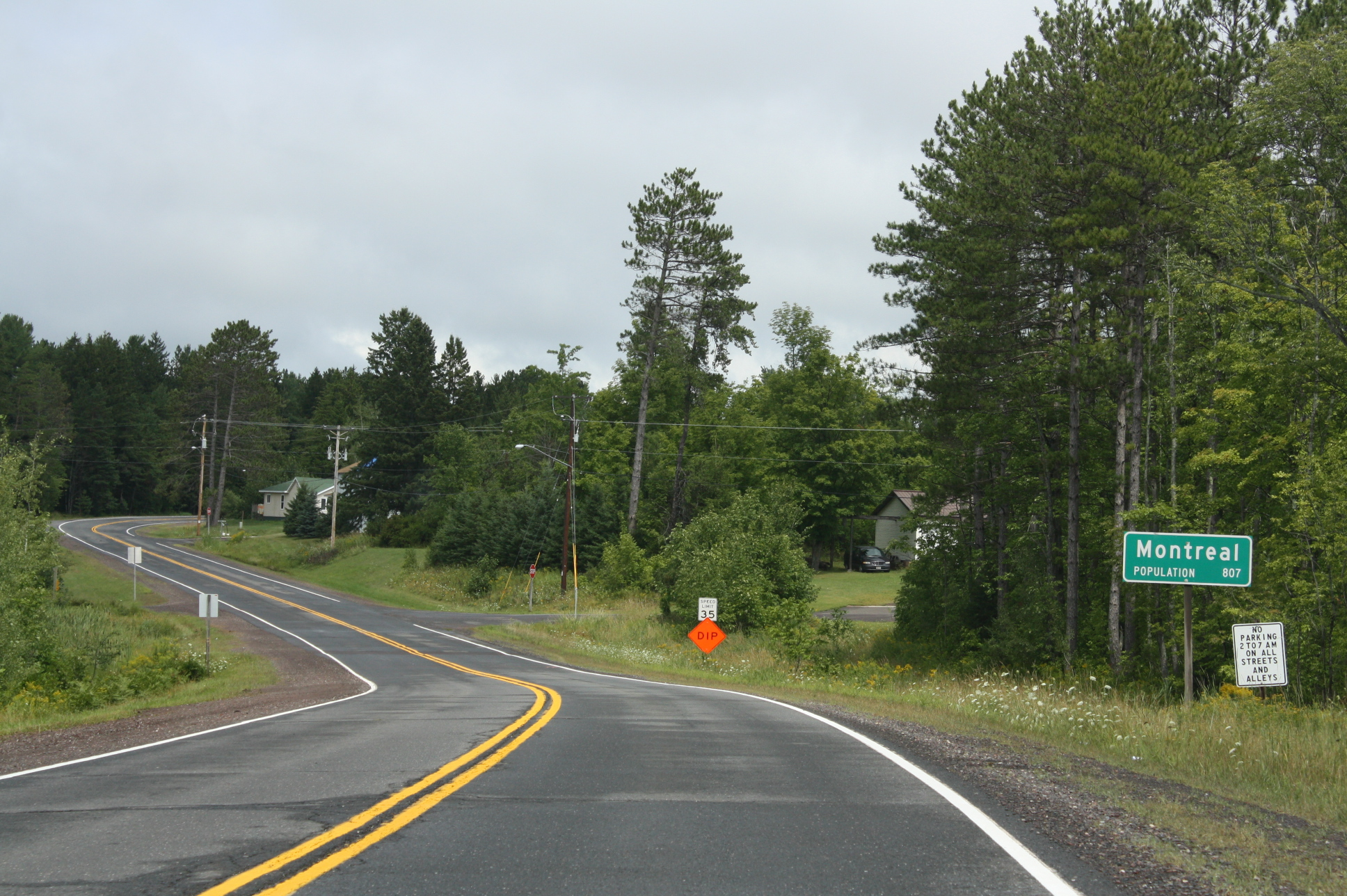
Looking east at the sign for Montreal
