= 63rd Wisconsin Legislature =

Wisconsin legislative term for 1937–1938

←	62nd	64th	→
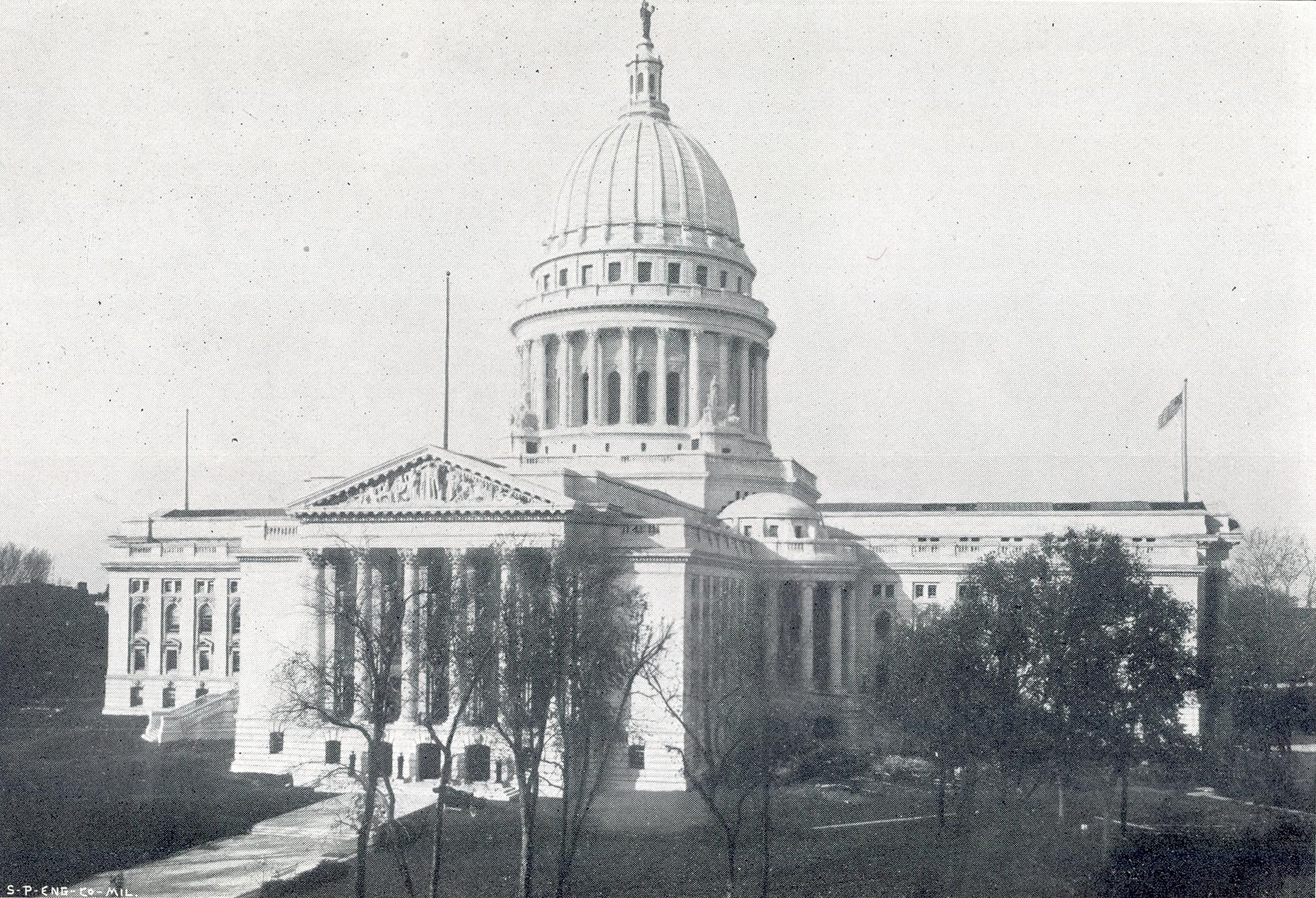
- Wisconsin State Capitol ca.1915

Overview
- Legislative body: Wisconsin Legislature
- Meeting place: Wisconsin State Capitol
- Term: January 4, 1937 – January 2, 1939
- Election: November 3, 1936

Senate
- Members: 33
- Senate President: Henry Gunderson (P) (resigned Oct. 16, 1937); Herman Ekern (P) (from May 16, 1938)
- President pro tempore: Walter J. Rush (P)
- Party control: Progressive

Assembly
- Members: 100
- Assembly Speaker: Paul Alfonsi (P)
- Party control: Progressive

Sessions
- Regular: January 13, 1937 – July 2, 1937

Special sessions
- Sep. 1937 Spec.: September 15, 1937 – October 16, 1937

The Sixty-Third Wisconsin Legislature convened from January 13, 1937, to July 2, 1937, in regular session, and reconvened in a special session from September 15, 1937, to October 16, 1937.

This was the high water mark for the power of the Wisconsin Progressive Party, as they controlled both chambers of the Legislature and the Governor's office.

Senators representing even-numbered districts were newly elected for this session and were serving the first two years of a four-year term. Assembly members were elected to a two-year term. Assembly members and even-numbered senators were elected in the general election of November 3, 1936. Senators representing odd-numbered districts were serving the third and fourth year of a four-year term, having been elected in the general election of November 6, 1934.

The governor of Wisconsin during this entire term was Progressive Philip La Follette, of Dane County, serving his third two-year term, having won re-election in the 1936 Wisconsin gubernatorial election.

== Major events ==
- January 4, 1937: Third inauguration of Philip La Follette as Governor of Wisconsin.
- January 20, 1937: Second inauguration of Franklin D. Roosevelt as President of the United States. The first presidential inauguration to take place on January 20.
- May 6, 1937: The commercial airship LZ 129 Hindenburg was destroyed in an accidental fire while attempting to dock at Naval Air Station Lakehurst, in New Jersey, killing 35 passengers and crew.
- July 7, 1937: The Marco Polo Bridge Incident between forces of the Empire of Japan and the Republic of China, ignited the Second Sino-Japanese War.
- July 22, 1937: The United States Senate rejected U.S. President Franklin Roosevelt's proposal to add seats to the United States Supreme Court.
- October 16, 1937: Wisconsin lieutenant governor Henry Gunderson resigned.
- March 13, 1938: German leader Adolf Hitler declared the annexation of Austria.
- May 16, 1938: Herman Ekern was appointed lieutenant governor of Wisconsin to fill the vacancy caused by the resignation of Henry Gunderson.
- September 29, 1938: The Munich Agreement was signed by German, Italian, French, and British delegates, resolving the Sudetenland crisis by allowing Germany to annex the contested territory from Czechoslovakia.
- November 8, 1938: 1938 United States general election:
  - Julius P. Heil (R) elected Governor of Wisconsin.
  - Alexander Wiley (R) elected United States senator from Wisconsin.
- November 9, 1938: Nazi activists and paramilitaries in Germany engaged in a nationwide pogrom against Jewish businesses and religious spaces, known as Kristallnacht.
- December 17, 1938: Otto Hahn discovered the nuclear fission of Uranium.

== Major legislation ==
- 1937 Act 51: Created the Wisconsin Labor Relations Board.

== Party summary ==
=== Senate summary ===
Senate partisan composition Democratic: 9 seats Progressive: 16 seats Republican: 8 seats

	Party (Shading indicates majority caucus)			Total	
	Dem.	Prog.	Rep.	Total	Vacant
End of previous Legislature	14	13	6	33	0
Start of Reg. Session	9	16	8	33	0
Final voting share	27.27%	48.48%	18.18%		
Beginning of the next Legislature	6	11	16	33	0

=== Assembly summary ===
Assembly partisan composition Democratic: 31 seats Progressive: 48 seats Republican: 21 seats

	Party (Shading indicates majority caucus)				Total	
	Dem.	Soc.	Prog.	Rep.	Total	Vacant
End of previous Legislature	35	3	43	17	98	2
Start of Reg. Session	31	0	48	21	100	0
From May 30, 1937 (Note: Republican Nels Larson (Winnebago County) died.)	31	0	48	20	99	1
Final voting share	31.31%		48.48%	20.2%		
Beginning of the next Legislature	15	0	32	53	100	0

== Sessions ==
- Regular session: January 13, 1937 – July 2, 1937
- September 1937 special session: September 15, 1937 – October 16, 1937

== Leaders ==
=== Senate leadership ===
- President of the Senate: Henry Gunderson (P) (resigned Oct. 16, 1937)
  - Herman Ekern (P) (appointed May 16, 1938)
- President pro tempore: Walter J. Rush (P–Neillsville)

=== Assembly leadership ===
- Speaker of the Assembly: Paul Alfonsi (P–Pence)

== Members ==
=== Members of the Senate ===
Members of the Senate for the Sixty-Third Wisconsin Legislature:

Senate partisan representation Democratic: 9 seats Progressive: 16 seats Republican: 8 seats

Dist.	Counties	Senator	Residence	Party
01	Door, Kewaunee, & Manitowoc	John E. Cashman	Denmark	Prog.
02	Brown & Oconto	Michael F. Kresky Jr.	Green Bay	Prog.
03	Milwaukee (South City)	Arthur L. Zimny	Milwaukee	Dem.
04	Milwaukee (Northeast County & Northeast City)	Oscar Morris	Milwaukee	Rep.
05	Milwaukee (Northwest City)	Harold V. Schoenecker	Milwaukee	Dem.
06	Milwaukee (North-Central City)	George Hampel	Milwaukee	Prog.
07	Milwaukee (Southeast County & Southeast City)	Max Galasinski	Milwaukee	Dem.
08	Milwaukee (Western County)	Allen Busby	West Milwaukee	Prog.
09	Milwaukee (City Downtown)	James L. Callan	Milwaukee	Dem.
10	Buffalo, Pepin, Pierce, & St. Croix	Kenneth S. White	River Falls	Rep.
11	Bayfield, Burnett, Douglas, & Washburn	Philip E. Nelson	Maple	Rep.
12	Ashland, Iron, Price, Rusk, Sawyer, & Vilas	Joseph E. McDermid	Ladysmith	Prog.
13	Dodge & Washington	Frank E. Panzer	Oakfield	Prog.
14	Outagamie & Shawano	Mike Mack	Shiocton	Rep.
15	Rock	Maurice Coakley	Beloit	Rep.
16	Crawford, Grant, & Vernon	Edward J. Roethe	Fennimore	Rep.
17	Green, Iowa, & Lafayette	George Engebretson	South Wayne	Prog.
18	Fond du Lac, Green Lake & Waushara	Morvin Duel	Fond du Lac	Rep.
19	Calumet & Winnebago	Pierce A. Morrissey	Rush Lake	Dem.
20	Ozaukee & Sheboygan	Harry W. Bolens	Port Washington	Dem.
21	Racine	Joseph Clancy	Racine	Dem.
22	Kenosha & Walworth	Conrad Shearer	Kenosha	Rep.
23	Portage & Waupaca	Herman J. Severson	Iola	Prog.
24	Clark, Taylor, & Wood	Walter J. Rush	Neillsville	Prog.
25	Lincoln & Marathon	Roland E. Kannenberg	Wausau	Prog.
26	Dane	Fred Risser	Madison	Prog.
27	Columbia, Richland, & Sauk	E. Myrwyn Rowlands	Cambria	Prog.
28	Chippewa & Eau Claire	G. Erle Ingram	Eau Claire	Prog.
29	Barron, Dunn, & Polk	John A. Anderson	Barron	Prog.
30	Florence, Forest, Langlade, Marinette, & Oneida	Ernest Sauld	Pembine	Dem.
31	Adams, Juneau, Monroe, & Marquette	J. Earl Leverich	Sparta	Prog.
32	Jackson, La Crosse, & Trempealeau	Oscar S. Paulson	La Crosse	Prog.
33	Jefferson & Waukesha	Chester Dempsey	Merton	Dem.

=== Members of the Assembly ===
Members of the Assembly for the Sixty-Third Wisconsin Legislature:

Assembly partisan composition Democratic: 31 seats Progressive: 48 seats Republican: 21 seats

Milwaukee County districts

Senate Dist.	County	Dist.	Representative	Party	Residence
31	Adams & Marquette		Edwin W. Blomquist	Prog.	Adams
12	Ashland		Harry P. Van Guilder	Prog.	Ashland
29	Barron		Charles A. Beggs	Prog.	Rice Lake
11	Bayfield		Laurie E. Carlson	Prog.	Bayfield
02	Brown	1	Harold A. Lytie	Dem.	Green Bay
02	Brown	2	William J. Sweeney	Dem.	De Pere
10	Buffalo & Pepin		Arthur A. Hitt	Prog.	Alma
11	Burnett & Washburn		Harry Bergren	Prog.	Siren
19	Calumet		Henry W. Hupfauf	Dem.	Harrison
28	Chippewa		George H. Hipke	Rep.	Stanley
24	Clark		Victor Nehs	Prog.	Neillsville
27	Columbia		Robert H. Roche	Dem.	Portage
16	Crawford		Donald C. McDowell	Rep.	Soldiers Grove
26	Dane	1	Herbert C. Schenk	Prog.	Madison
26	Dane	2	James C. Hanson	Prog.	Deerfield
26	Dane	3	Albert J. Baker	Prog.	Mount Horeb
13	Dodge	1	Elmer L. Genzmer	Dem.	Mayville
13	Dodge	2	Henry E. Krueger	Dem.	Beaver Dam
01	Door		Frank N. Graass	Rep.	Sturgeon Bay
11	Douglas	1	Michael H. Hall	Prog.	Superior
11	Douglas	2	Elmer Peterson	Prog.	Poplar
29	Dunn		James D. Millar	Prog.	Menomonie
28	Eau Claire		John T. Pritchard	Prog.	Eau Claire
30	Florence, Forest, & Oneida		Henry J. Berquist	Prog.	Rhinelander
18	Fond du Lac	1	Maurice J. Fitzsimons Jr.	Dem.	Fond du Lac
18	Fond du Lac	2	Arthur F. Hinz	Rep.	Ripon
16	Grant	1	William H. Goldthorpe	Rep.	Cuba City
16	Grant	2	P. Bradley McIntyre	Rep.	Lancaster
17	Green		Ernst J. Hoesly	Prog.	New Glarus
18	Green Lake & Waushara		Reuben W. Peterson	Rep.	Berlin
17	Iowa		John S. Jackson	Prog.	Mineral Point
12	Iron & Vilas		Paul Alfonsi	Prog.	Pence
32	Jackson		Peter A. Hemmy	Prog.	Humbird
33	Jefferson		Palmer F. Daugs	Dem.	Fort Atkinson
31	Juneau		William H. Barnes	Prog.	New Lisbon
22	Kenosha	1	Alfred C. Grosvenor	Dem.	Kenosha
22	Kenosha	2	Emil Costello	Prog.	Kenosha
01	Kewaunee		Albert D. Shimek	Dem.	Algoma
32	La Crosse	1	Oliver H. Fritz	Prog.	La Crosse
32	La Crosse	2	Harry W. Schilling	Prog.	Onalaska
17	Lafayette		Henry Youngblood	Rep.	Wiota
30	Langlade		James T. Cavanaugh	Dem.	Antigo
25	Lincoln		Reno W. Trego	Prog.	Merrill
01	Manitowoc	1	Francis A. Yindra	Dem.	Manitowoc
01	Manitowoc	2	David Sigman	Prog.	Two Rivers
25	Marathon	1	Joseph L. Barber	Prog.	Marathon
25	Marathon	2	Rudolph Meisner	Dem.	Wausau
30	Marinette		Charles A. Budlong	Rep.	Marinette
09	Milwaukee	1	Cornelius T. Young	Dem.	Milwaukee
06	Milwaukee	2	Andrew Biemiller	Prog.	Milwaukee
08	Milwaukee	3	Arthur J. Balzer	Prog.Dem.	Milwaukee
09	Milwaukee	4	Robert E. Tehan	Dem.	Milwaukee
03	Milwaukee	5	Mary O. Kryszak	Dem.	Milwaukee
09	Milwaukee	6	Ben Rubin	Prog.	Milwaukee
06	Milwaukee	7	Arthur Koegel	Prog.	Milwaukee
08	Milwaukee	8	Donald P. Ryan	Dem.	Milwaukee
05	Milwaukee	9	Joseph F. Mueller	Prog.	Milwaukee
07	Milwaukee	10	John W. Grobschmidt	Prog.	South Milwaukee
03	Milwaukee	11	Martin Franzkowiak	Dem.	Milwaukee
07	Milwaukee	12	Peter Pyszczynski	Dem.	Milwaukee
04	Milwaukee	13	Bernard B. Kroenke	Dem.	Milwaukee
04	Milwaukee	14	Milton T. Murray	Rep.	Milwaukee
05	Milwaukee	15	Francis T. Murphy	Dem.	Milwaukee
06	Milwaukee	16	Herman B. Wegner	Prog.	Milwaukee
07	Milwaukee	17	Martin F. Howard	Dem.	Milwaukee
06	Milwaukee	18	Edward H. Kiefer	Prog.	Milwaukee
05	Milwaukee	19	Joseph L. Garvens	Dem.	West Milwaukee
08	Milwaukee	20	Charles B. Perry	Rep.	Wauwatosa
31	Monroe		Earl D. Hall	Prog.	Greenfield
02	Oconto		Frank J. Lingelbach	Dem.	Oconto
14	Outagamie	1	Mark Catlin Jr.	Rep.	Appleton
14	Outagamie	2	William M. Rohan	Dem.	Kaukauna
20	Ozaukee		Nicholas J. Bichler	Dem.	Belgium
10	Pierce		Theodore Swanson	Prog.	Ellsworth
29	Polk		Dougald D. Kennedy	Prog.	Amery
23	Portage		John Kostuck	Prog.	Stevens Point
12	Price		Felix A. Kremer	Prog.	Phillips
21	Racine	1	John L. Sieb	Prog.	Racine
21	Racine	2	Jack Harvey	Prog.	Racine
21	Racine	3	Edward F. Rakow	Dem.	Burlington
27	Richland		Vernon W. Thomson	Rep.	Richland Center
15	Rock	1	Edward Grassman	Rep.	Edgerton
15	Rock	2	Burger M. Engebretson	Rep.	Beloit
12	Rusk & Sawyer		Carl R. Nyman	Prog.	Hayward
27	Sauk		George J. Woerth	Prog.	Sauk City
14	Shawano		Paul T. Fuhrman	Prog.	Bowler
20	Sheboygan	1	Joseph M. Theisen	Dem.	Sheboygan
20	Sheboygan	2	Charles A. Laack	Dem.	Plymouth
10	St. Croix		Arthur D. Kelly	Prog.	Hudson
24	Taylor		Carl M. Nelson	Rep.	Medford
32	Trempealeau		Tom Lomsdahl	Prog.	Osseo
16	Vernon		Hjalmer S. Halvorsen	Prog.	Westby
22	Walworth		Ora R. Rice	Rep.	Delavan
13	Washington		Henry O. Schowalter	Dem.	West Bend
33	Waukesha	1	Lyle E. Douglass	Rep.	Waukesha
33	Waukesha	2	Alfred R. Ludvigsen	Rep.	Pewaukee
23	Waupaca		Alvin A. Handrich	Prog.	Manawa
19	Winnebago	1	Leo T. Niemuth	Rep.	Oshkosh
19	Winnebago	2	Nels Larson	Rep.	Neenah
24	Wood		Byrde M. Vaughan	Prog.	Wisconsin Rapids

== Committees ==
=== Senate committees ===
- Senate Standing Committee on Agriculture and Labor – J. E. Leverich, chair
- Senate Standing Committee on Committees – E. M. Rowlands, chair
- Senate Standing Committee on Contingent Expenditures – R. E. Kannenberg, chair
- Senate Standing Committee on Corporations and Taxation – W. J. Rush, chair
- Senate Standing Committee on Education and Public Welfare – P. E. Nelson, chair
- Senate Standing Committee on Highways – F. E. Panzer, chair
- Senate Standing Committee on the Judiciary – H. J. Severson, chair
- Senate Standing Committee on Legislative Procedure – W. J. Rush, chair
- Senate Standing Committee on State and Local Government – A. L. Zimny, chair

=== Assembly committees ===
- Assembly Standing Committee on Agriculture – H. W. Schilling, chair
- Assembly Standing Committee on Commerce and Manufactures – E. W. Blomquist, chair
- Assembly Standing Committee on Conservation – P. A. Hemmy, chair
- Assembly Standing Committee on Contingent Expenditures – J. L. Sieb, chair
- Assembly Standing Committee on Education – A. A. Hitt, chair
- Assembly Standing Committee on Elections – A. D. Kelly, chair
- Assembly Standing Committee on Engrossed Bills – B. B. Kroenke, chair
- Assembly Standing Committee on Enrolled Bills – M. Franzkowiak, chair
- Assembly Standing Committee on Excise and Fees – A. J. Balzer, chair
- Assembly Standing Committee on Highways – E. D. Hall, chair
- Assembly Standing Committee on Insurance and Banking – J. W. Grobschmidt, chair
- Assembly Standing Committee on the Judiciary – B. M. Vaughan, chair
- Assembly Standing Committee on Labor – D. Sigman, chair
- Assembly Standing Committee on Municipalities – M. H. Hall, chair
- Assembly Standing Committee on Printing – T. Swanson, chair
- Assembly Standing Committee on Public Welfare – E. H. Kiefer, chair
- Assembly Standing Committee on Revision – J. L. Barber, chair
- Assembly Standing Committee on Rules – H. B. Wegner, chair
- Assembly Standing Committee on State Affairs – J. D. Millar, chair
- Assembly Standing Committee on Taxation – H. S. Halvorsen, chair
- Assembly Standing Committee on Third Reading – M. O. Kryszak, chair
- Assembly Standing Committee on Transportation – J. T. Pritchard, chair

=== Joint committees ===
- Joint Standing Committee on Finance – E. M. Rowlands (Sen.) & E. J. Hoesly (Asm.), co-chairs

== Employees ==
=== Senate employees ===
- Chief Clerk: Lawrence R. Larsen
  - Assistant Chief Clerk: Arno C. Handel
- Sergeant-at-Arms: Emil A. Hartman
  - Assistant Sergeant-at-Arms: Albert E. Daley

=== Assembly employees ===
- Chief Clerk: Lester R. Johnson
- Sergeant-at-Arms: Gustave Rheingans
  - Assistant Sergeant-at-Arms: Phillip K. Lalor
