= Senator Rusch =

Senator Rusch may refer to:

- Arthur Rusch (born 1946), South Dakota State Senate
- Nicholas J. Rusch (1822–1864), Iowa State Senate
- Walter J. Rush (1871–1961), Wisconsin State Senate
