= Pemebonwon River =

River in the U.S. state of Wisconsin

Coordinates: 45°37′37″N 87°48′11″W

The Pemebonwon River is a 6.1-mile-long (9.8 km) river in the U.S. state of Wisconsin.

It is a tributary of the Menominee River and flows through Marinette County. It is formed by the confluence of its North and South branches. The North Branch contains a waterfall known as Long Slide Falls. The Pemebonwon River empties into the Menominee River 10 miles (16 km) east of Pembine, Wisconsin.
