= Pembine (CDP), Wisconsin =

Census-designated place in Wisconsin, United States

Pembine, Wisconsin
- Census-designated place
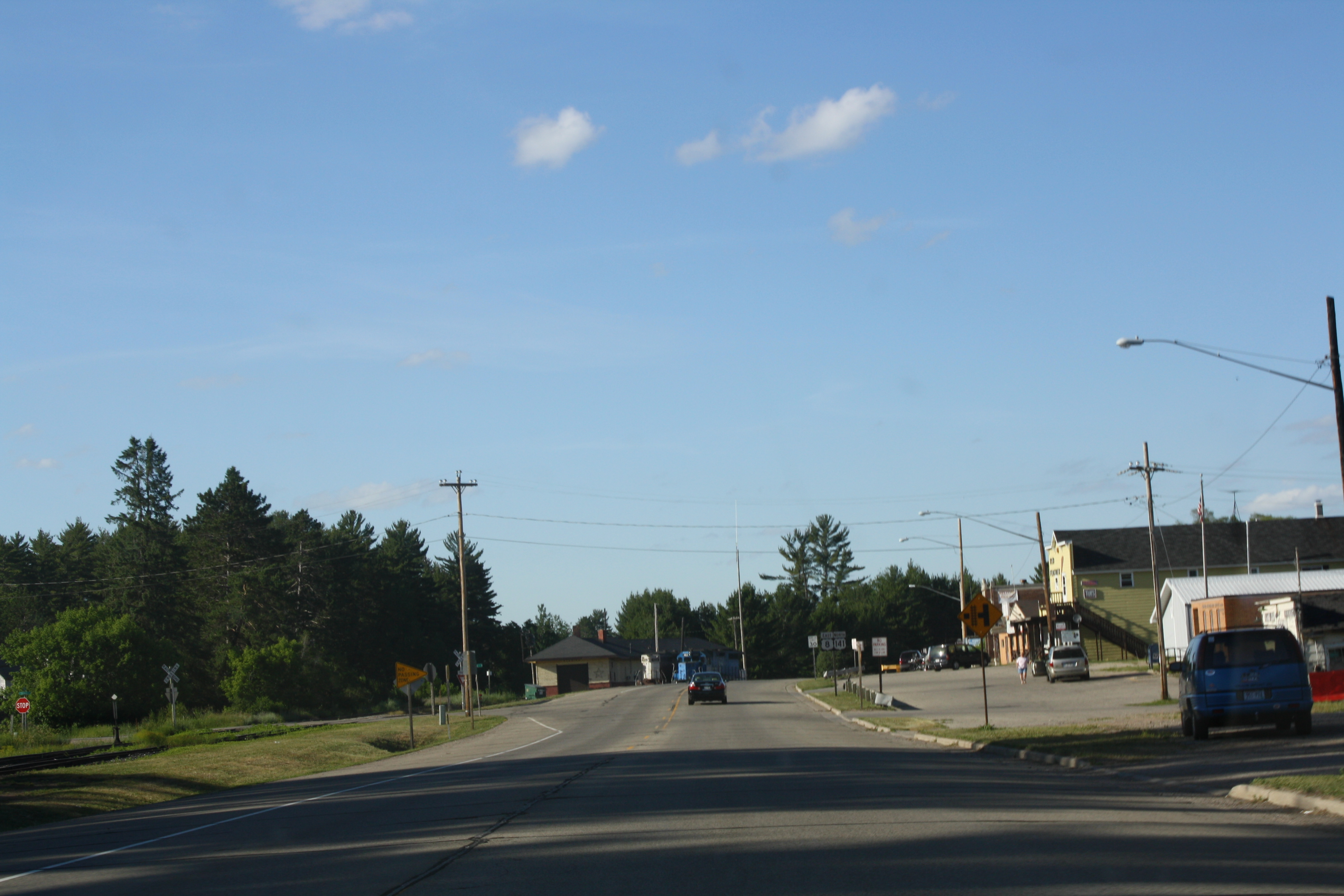
- Looking north at downtown Pembine

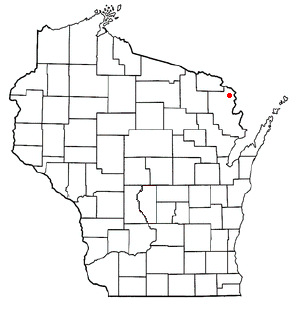
- Location in Wisconsin
- Coordinates: 45°38′07″N 87°59′27″W
- Country: United States
- State: Wisconsin
- County: Marinette

Area
  - Total: 0.599 sq mi (1.55 km^{2})
  - Land: 0.598 sq mi (1.55 km^{2})
  - Water: 0.001 sq mi (0.0026 km^{2})
- Elevation: 971 ft (296 m)

Population (2020)
  - Total: 188
  - Density: 314/sq mi (121/km^{2})
- Time zone: UTC-6 (Central (CST))
  - Summer (DST): UTC-5 (CDT)
- Area codes: 715 & 534
- GNIS feature ID: 1571162

Pembine is an unincorporated census-designated place in Marinette County, Wisconsin United States, in the town of Pembine. It is located on U.S. Route 141 and U.S. Route 8. It uses the Postal ZIP code 54156. As of the 2020 census, its population is 188.

Historical population
| Census | Pop. | Note | %± |
|---|---|---|---|
| 2010 | 193 | | — |
| 2020 | 188 | | −2.6% |
U.S. Decennial Census

== Images ==
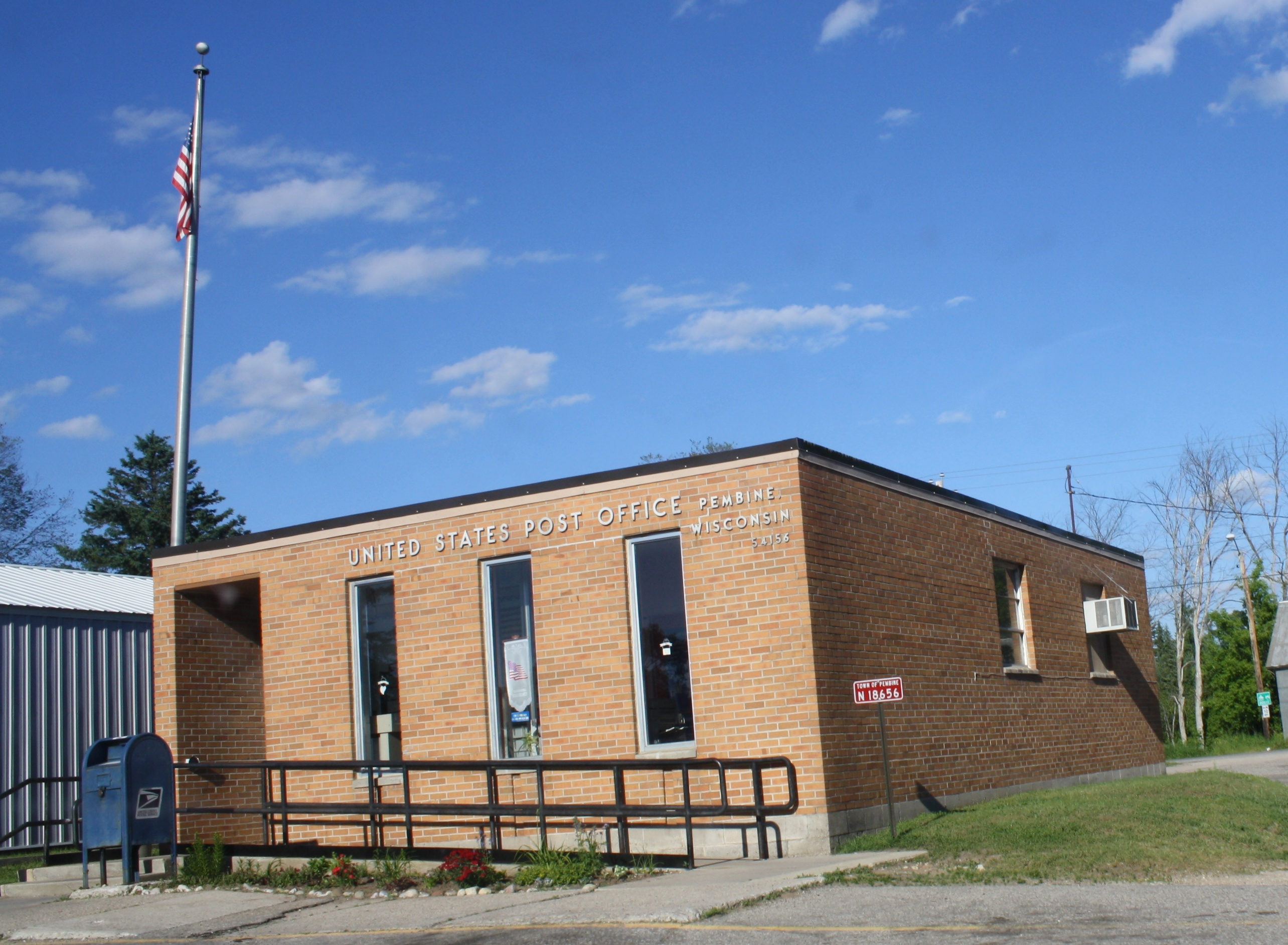
Post office

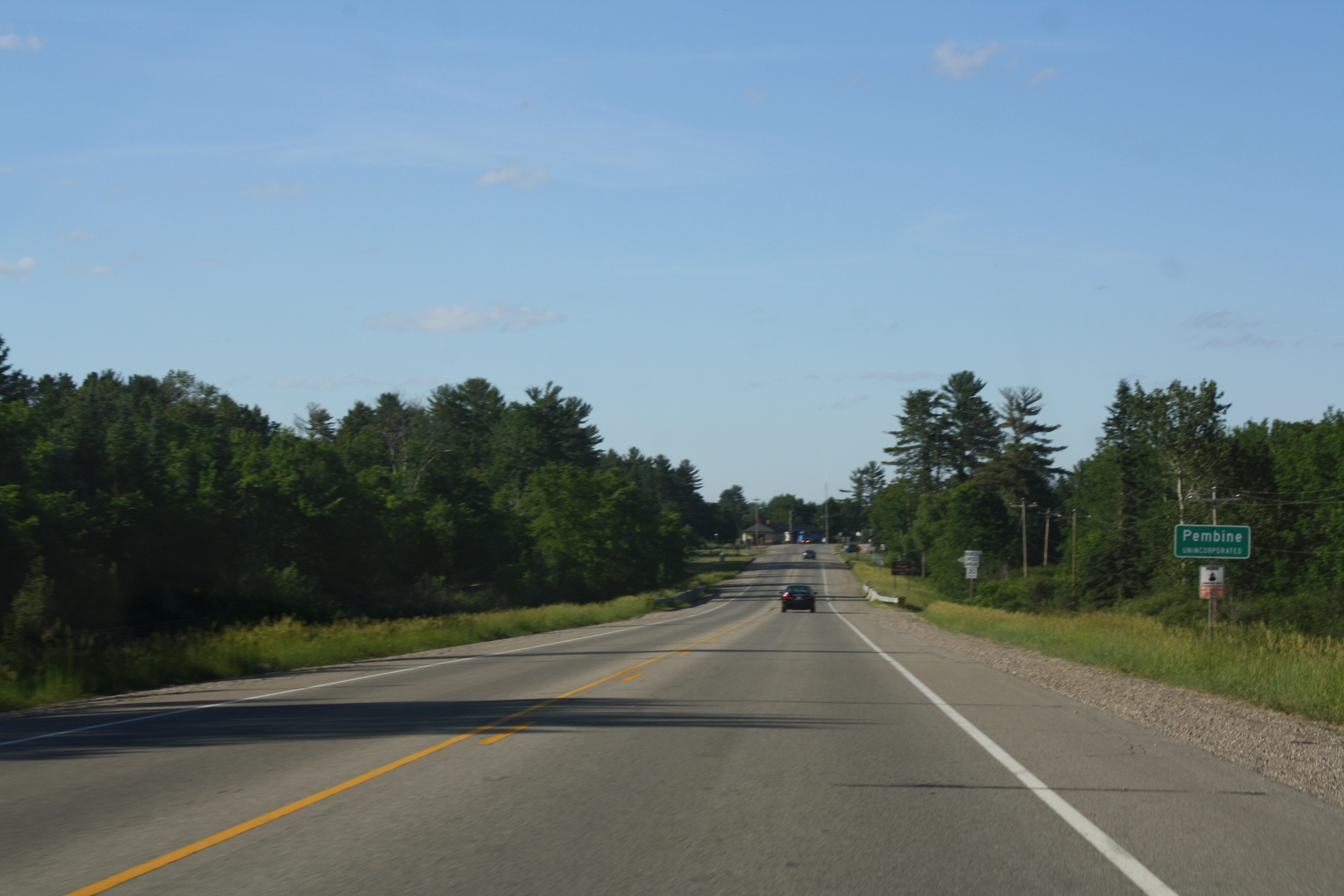
Looking north at the welcome sign

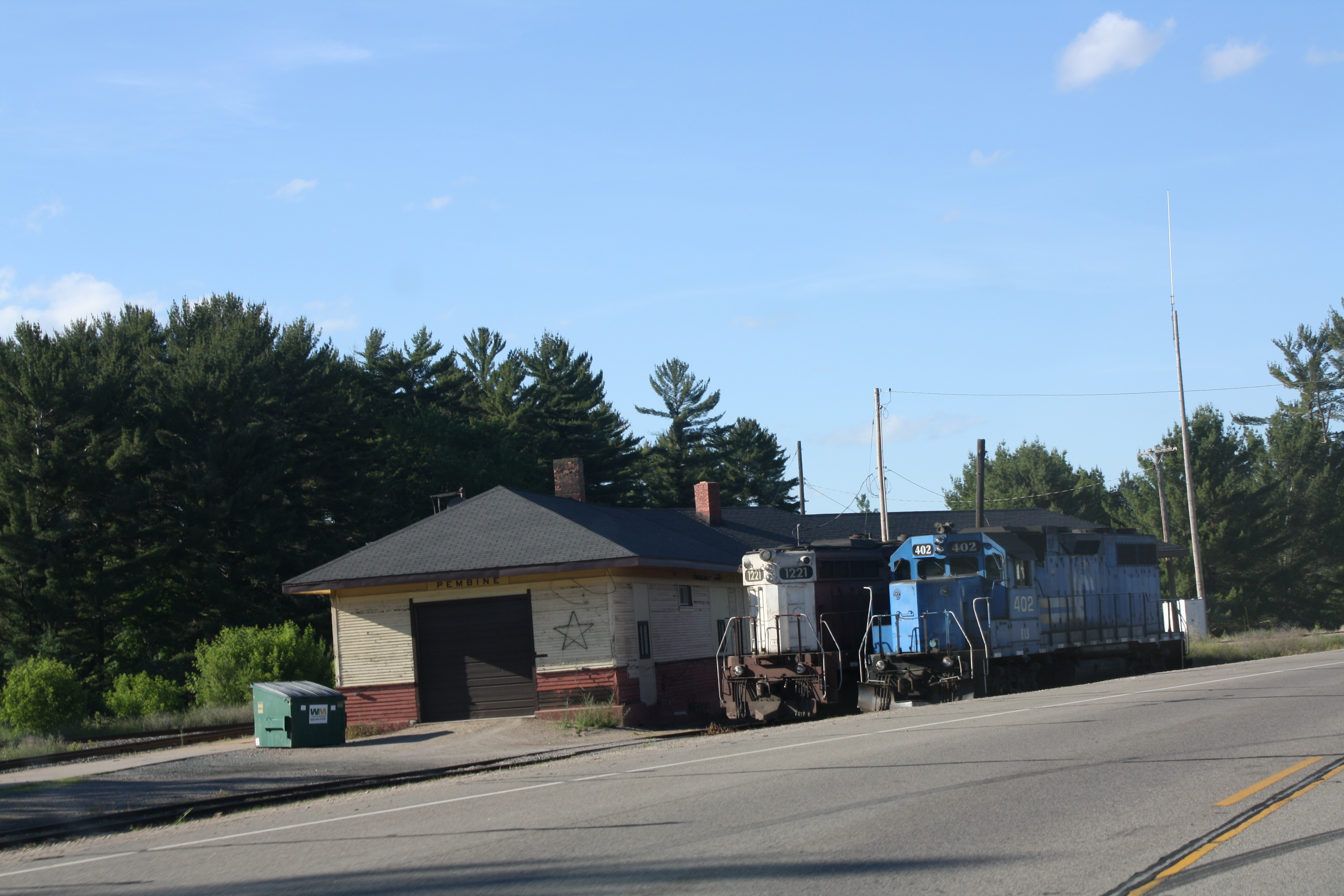
Train station

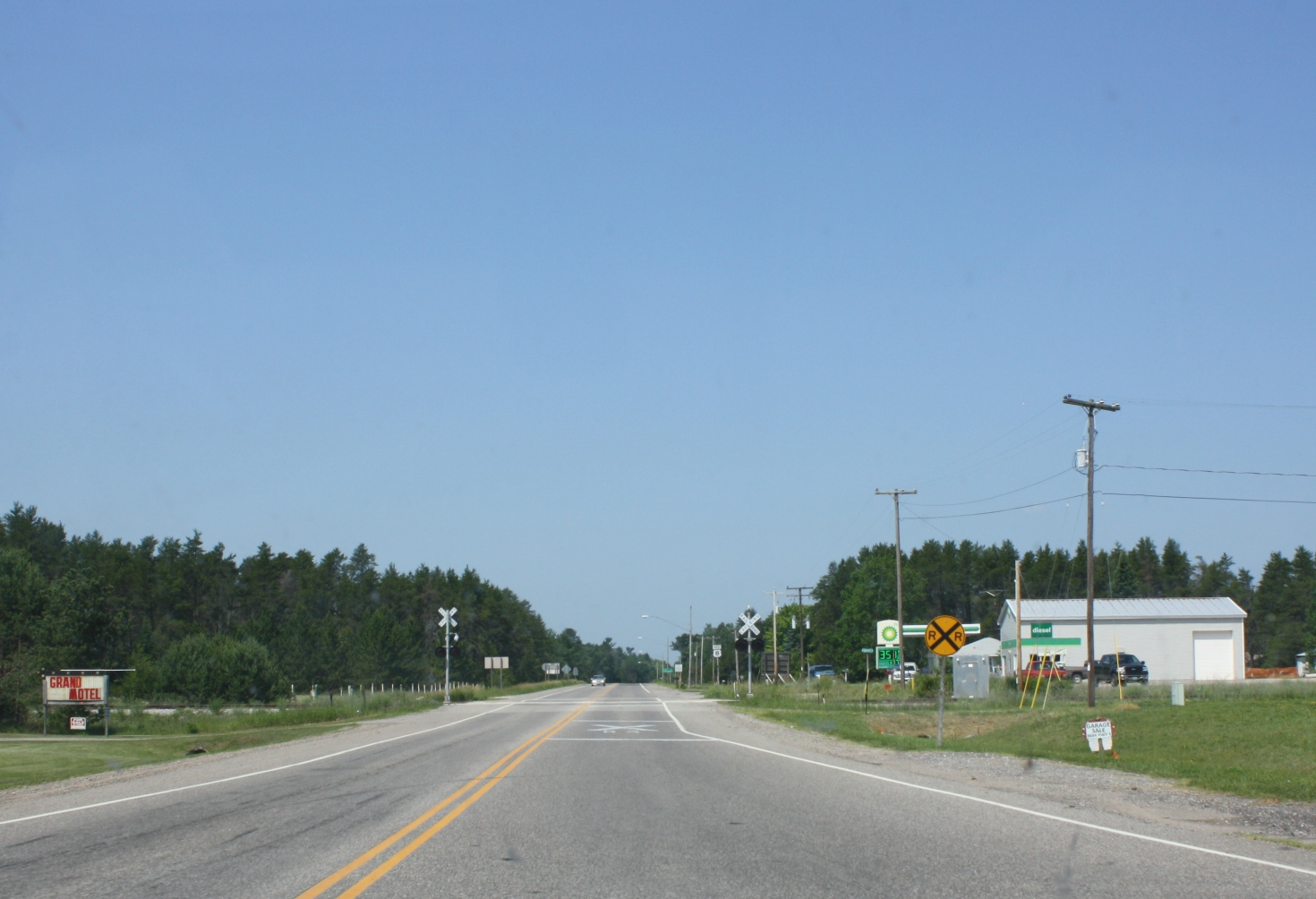
Looking west
