= Doylestown, Wisconsin =

- Village
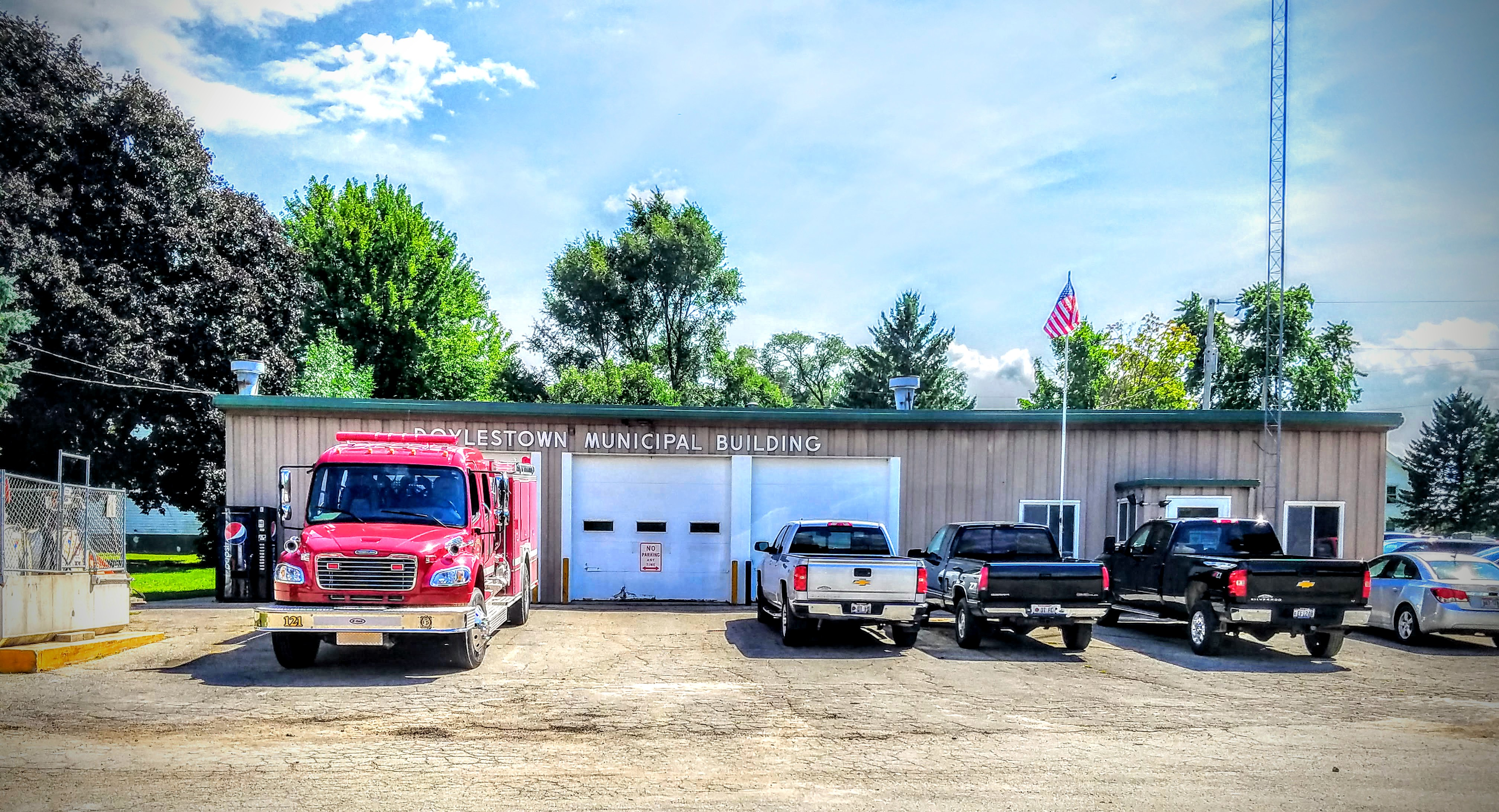
- Doylestown Municipal Building

- Location of Doylestown in Columbia County, Wisconsin
- Coordinates: 43°25′40″N 89°8′57″W
- Country: United States
- State: Wisconsin
- County: Columbia

Area
  - Total: 4.00 sq mi (10.36 km^{2})
  - Land: 3.89 sq mi (10.07 km^{2})
  - Water: 0.11 sq mi (0.29 km^{2})
- Elevation: 945 ft (288 m)

Population (2020)
  - Total: 280
  - Density: 72/sq mi (28/km^{2})
- Time zone: UTC-6 (Central (CST))
  - Summer (DST): UTC-5 (CDT)
- FIPS code: 55-20775
- GNIS feature ID: 1564096

Doylestown is a village in Columbia County, Wisconsin, United States. The population was 280 at the 2020 census. It is part of the Madison Metropolitan Statistical Area.

== Geography ==
According to the United States Census Bureau, the village has a total area of 4.02 square miles (10.41 km^{2}), of which 3.9 square miles (10.10 km^{2}) is land and 0.12 square miles (0.31 km^{2}) is water.

== Demographics ==
Historical population
Census	Pop.	Note	%±
1870	100		—
1880	119		19.0%
1910	259		—
1920	270		4.2%
1930	238		−11.9%
1940	253		6.3%
1950	261		3.2%
1960	249		−4.6%
1970	265		6.4%
1980	294		10.9%
1990	316		7.5%
2000	328		3.8%
2010	297		−9.5%
2020	280		−5.7%
U.S. Decennial Census

=== 2010 census ===
As of the census of 2010, there were 297 people, 116 households, and 85 families living in the village. The population density was 76.2 inhabitants per square mile (29.4/km^{2}). There were 123 housing units at an average density of 31.5 per square mile (12.2/km^{2}). The racial makeup of the village was 97.6% White, 0.3% Native American, 1.3% from other races, and 0.7% from two or more races. Hispanic or Latino people of any race were 2% of the population.

There were 116 households, of which 32.8% had children under the age of 18 living with them, 54.3% were married couples living together, 13.8% had a female householder with no husband present, 5.2% had a male householder with no wife present, and 26.7% were non-families. 18.1% of all households were made up of individuals, and 7.7% had someone living alone who was 65 years of age or older. The average household size was 2.56 and the average family size was 2.93.

The median age in the village was 43.3 years. 20.9% of residents were under the age of 18; 7.1% were between the ages of 18 and 24; 25.6% were from 25 to 44; 32.3% were from 45 to 64; and 14.1% were 65 years of age or older. The gender makeup of the village was 52.2% male and 47.8% female.

=== 2000 census ===
As of the census of 2000, there were 328 people, 121 households, and 84 families living in the village. The population density was 83.4 people per square mile (32.2/km^{2}). There were 123 housing units at an average density of 31.3 per square mile (12.1/km^{2}). The racial makeup of the village was 99.09% White, 0.61% African American, and 0.3% from two or more races. Hispanic or Latino people of any race were 4.27% of the population.

There were 121 households, out of which 40.5% had children under the age of 18 living with them, 54.5% were married couples living together, 8.3% had a female householder with no husband present, and 29.8% were non-families. 20.7% of all households were made up of individuals, and 9.1% had someone living alone who was 65 years of age or older. The average household size was 2.71 and the average family size was 3.15.

In the village, the population was spread out, with 31.1% under the age of 18, 5.2% from 18 to 24, 36.3% from 25 to 44, 13.4% from 45 to 64, and 14% who were 65 years of age or older. The median age was 34 years. For every 100 females, there were 97.6 males. For every 100 females age 18 and over, there were 91.5 males.

The median income for a household in the village was $53,125, and the median income for a family was $56,563. Males had a median income of $36,250 versus $26,429 for females. The per capita income for the village was $19,157. None of the families and 2.4% of the population were living below the poverty line, including no people under 18 and 5% of those over 64.

== Government ==
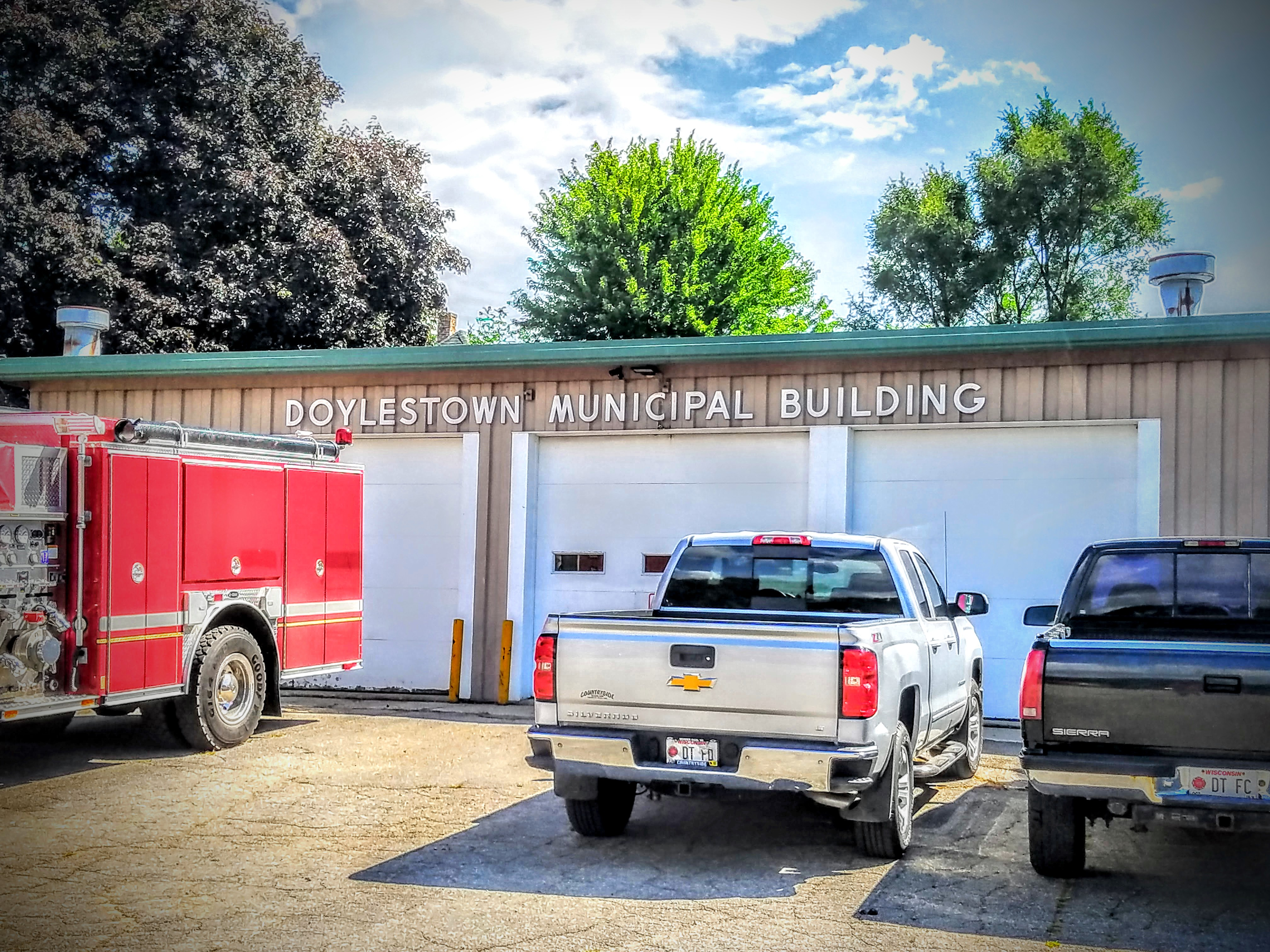
Doylestown Village Hall

Doylestown is administered by a village board, board president, and village clerk. The Municipal Building houses the village board, village clerk, and fire department.

The village and surrounding area are served by the Doylestown Fire Department.

The village has a post office with a zip code of 53928.

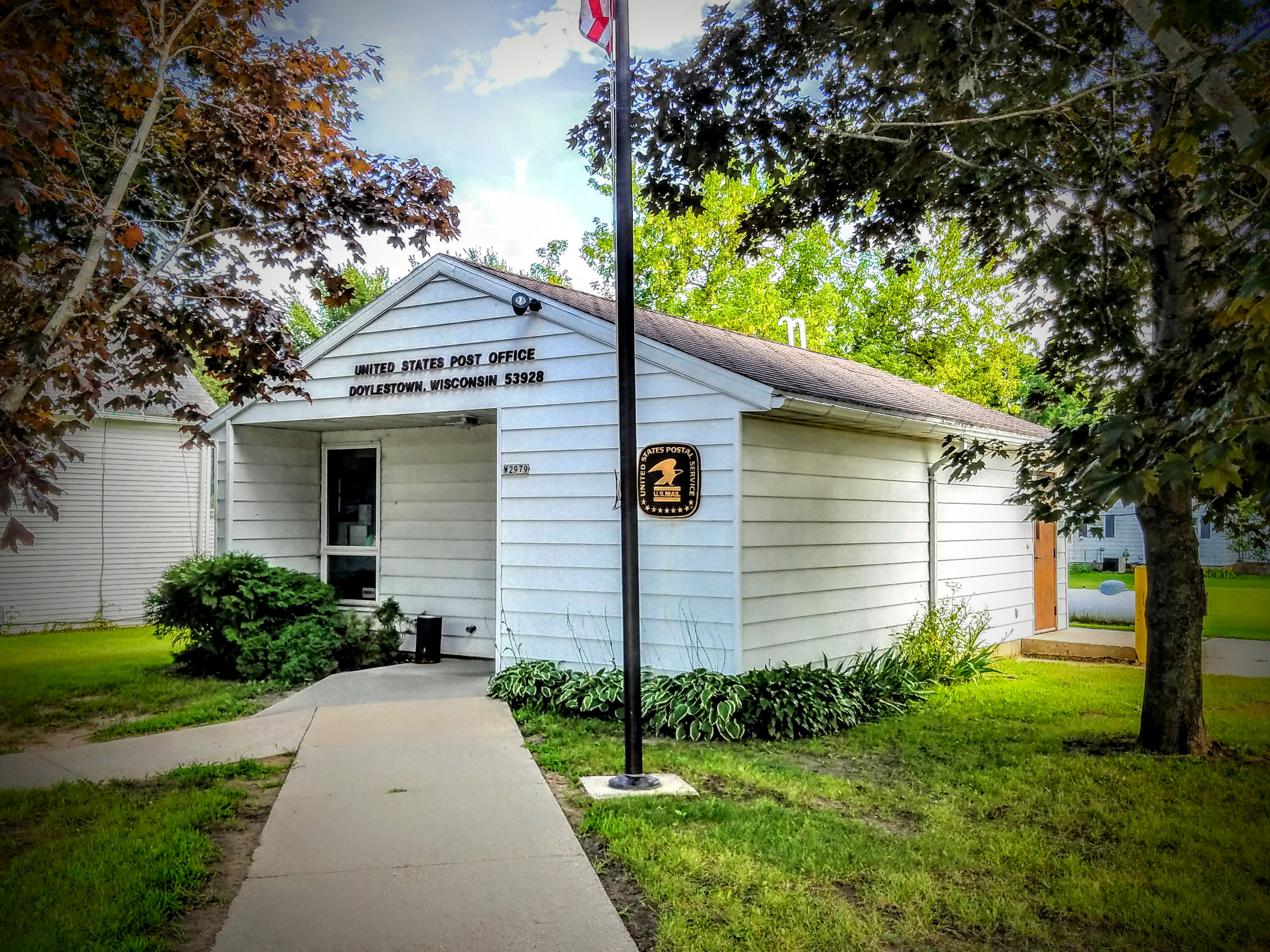
Doylestown Post Office

== Politics ==
Doylestown village vote by party in presidential elections
Year	Democratic	Republican	Third parties
2016	45.32% 63	43.88% 61	10.79% 15
2012	63.38% 90	34.51% 49	2.11% 3
2008	50.66% 77	46.05% 70	3.29% 5
2004	44.59% 66	55.41% 82

== Notable people ==
- Robert H. Roche, Wisconsin State Representative; born in Doylestown
