= Kremlin, Wisconsin =

- Unincorporated community
- Location within Wisconsin Location within the United States
- Coordinates: 45°39′03″N 87°50′41″W
- Country: United States
- State: Wisconsin
- County: Marinette
- Elevation: 843 ft (257 m)
- Time zone: UTC-6 (Central (CST))
  - Summer (DST): UTC-5 (CDT)
- Area codes: 715 & 534
- GNIS feature ID: 1577684

Kremlin is an unincorporated community located in the town of Pembine, Marinette County, Wisconsin, United States.

== Geography ==
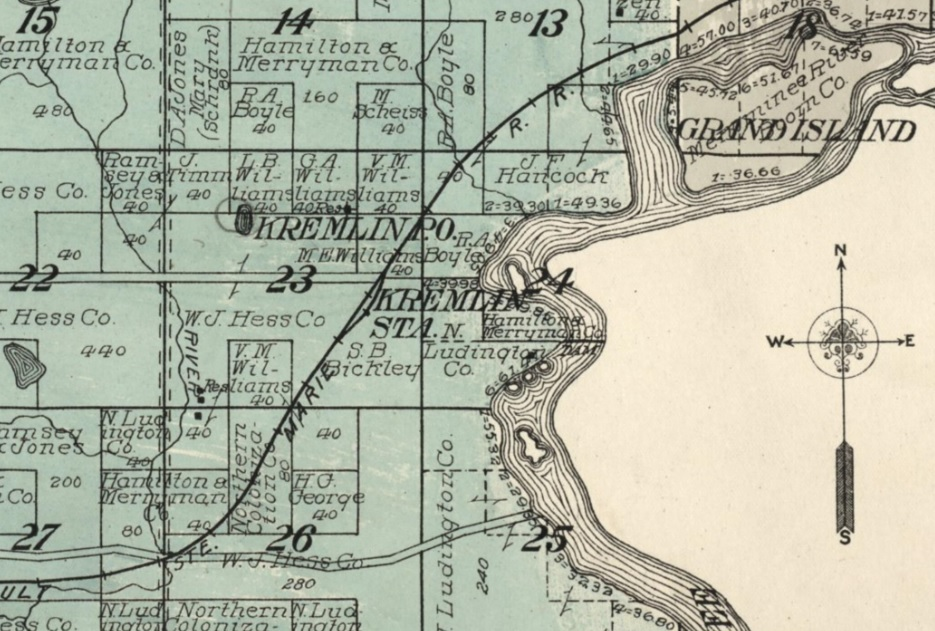
Kremlin, 1912 map detail

Kremlin is located along the Canadian National Railway 12 miles (19 km) southeast of Niagara. It stand at the east end of Kremlin Road, where it intersects with Chapman Road, at an elevation of 843 feet (257 m). It is connected by road to Pembine to the west and by rail to Faithorn, Michigan to the east. The Menominee River flows to the east, past Nose Peak Island and the Pemebonwon Islands. Kimlark Lake (elevation 810 ft or 250 m) lies immediately to the north of Kremlin, and Long Lake (elevation 806 ft or 246 m) to the west.

== Name ==
Kremlin was named after the Moscow Kremlin in 1886 by English financiers of the railroad through the settlement, possibly because relatives of the financiers were married to Russian nobility.

== History ==
There was formerly a post office in Kremlin. On January 2, 1909, the last known cougar sighting in Wisconsin occurred at Kremlin until the species reappeared in the state in 2009. In 1939, the company Flintkote Roofing established a plant in Kremlin to produce crushed stone for roofing, operated by the Staso Milling Company. The plant was then owned by the Central Commercial Company and then the Ruberoid Company, which merged to create GAF Materials Corporation in 1967. A reforestation program was started in Kremlin in 1946, involving the planting of 550,000 white pine, red pine, and jack pine. In 1982 a natural gas pipeline was built to the area to power the mining operations; the gas was supplied from a Michigan Consolidated Gas substation south of Vulcan, Michigan, and the pipeline runs under the Menominee River and Sturgeon River.

== Industry ==
Kremlin is currently the location of a Specialty Granules Incorporated (SGI) plant, where there is an open-pit quarry for meta-andesite rock. The rock is crushed and processed into semi-ceramic coated colored roofing granules at the site.
