= Chauncey E. Heath =

American politician

Chauncey E. Heath was a member of the Wisconsin State Assembly.

== Biography ==
Heath was born on July 17, 1881, in Arcadia, Wisconsin. His parents were Perry Sylvester Heath and Sarah Jane (Briggs) Heath. Heath worked as a mail carrier from 1906 to 1932 and as a farmer from 1932 to 1940. Additionally, he served in the Wisconsin National Guard from 1920 to 1926.

In 1902, Heath married Ethel Penny, who died in 1920. He would later marry Selma V. Wagner and, after her death in 1941, he married Alice Bernice (Engum) Pederson in 1943. Heath died in Osseo, Wisconsin, in 1965 and was buried in Arcadia.

== Electoral career ==
Heath was elected Sheriff of Trempealeau County, Wisconsin, in 1940 and 1942. Later, he was a member of the Assembly during the 1945 session. His bid for re-election in 1946 was unsuccessful after he was defeated in the Republican primary.
