= Osseo, Wisconsin =

- City
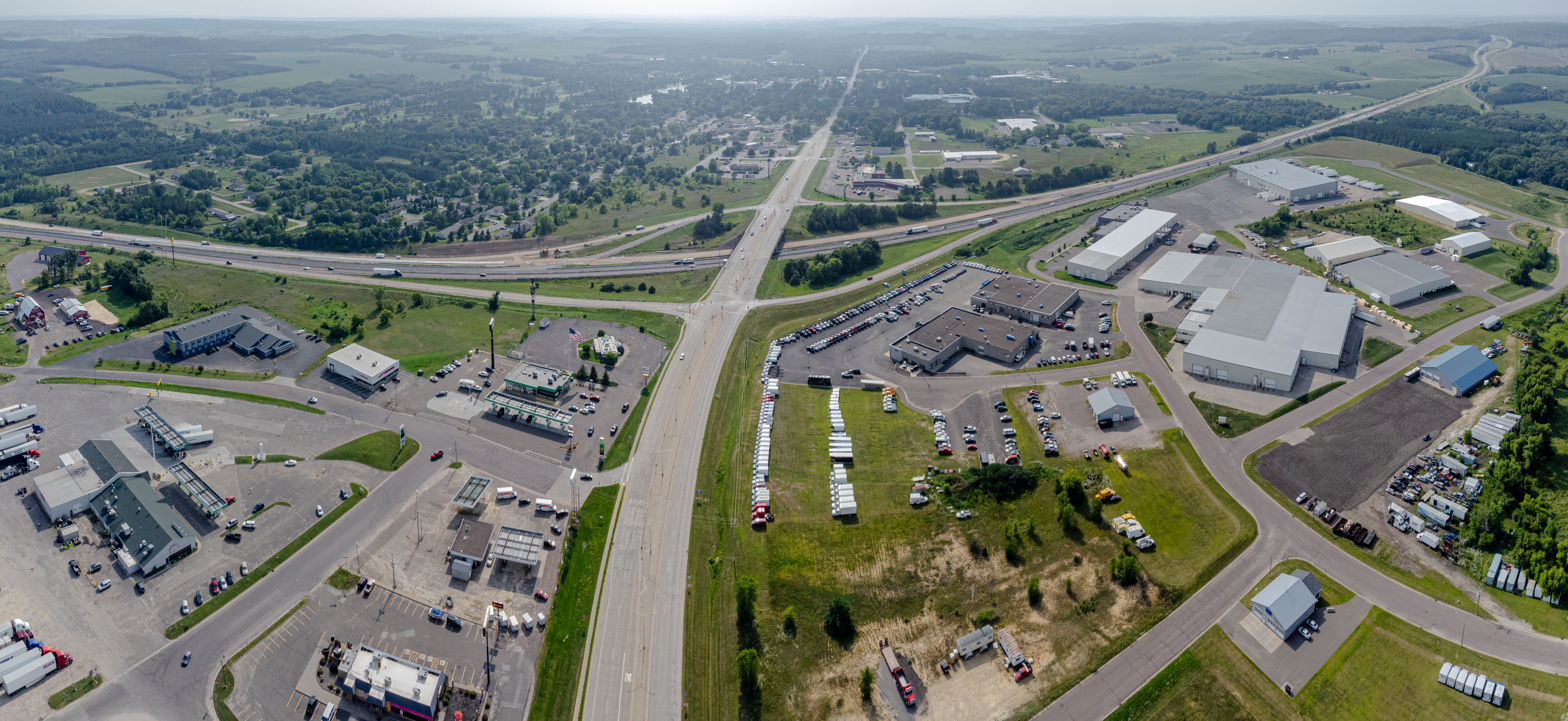

- Location of Osseo in Trempealeau County, Wisconsin.

- Location within Wisconsin Location within the United States
- Coordinates: 44°34′42″N 91°13′6″W
- Country: United States
- State: Wisconsin
- County: Trempealeau

Area
  - Total: 2.07 sq mi (5.36 km^{2})
  - Land: 2.05 sq mi (5.30 km^{2})
  - Water: 0.023 sq mi (0.06 km^{2})
- Elevation: 958 ft (292 m)

Population (2020)
  - Total: 1,811
  - Density: 819.3/sq mi (316.35/km^{2})
- Time zone: UTC-6 (Central (CST))
  - Summer (DST): UTC-5 (CDT)
- Area codes: 715 & 534
- FIPS code: 55-60575
- GNIS feature ID: 1570879
- Website: www.cityofosseo.us

Osseo (/ˈɒsioʊ/ OSS-ee-oh) is a city located in Trempealeau County, Wisconsin, United States, at the confluence of the North and South Forks of the Buffalo River. The population was 1,811 at the 2020 census.

== Geography ==
Osseo is located at 44°34'42" North, 91°13'6" West (44.578306, -91.218273).

According to the United States Census Bureau, the city has a total area of 2.09 square miles (5.41 km^{2}), of which 2.06 square miles (5.34 km^{2}) is land and 0.03 square miles (0.08 km^{2}) is water.

The city lies on US Highway 10 (which serves as the main east–west thoroughfare through town), US Highway 53 and Interstate 94.

== Demographics ==
Historical population
Census	Pop.	Note	%±
1880	149		—
1900	472		—
1910	548		16.1%
1920	802		46.4%
1930	933		16.3%
1940	1,105		18.4%
1950	1,126		1.9%
1960	1,144		1.6%
1970	1,356		18.5%
1980	1,474		8.7%
1990	1,551		5.2%
2000	1,669		7.6%
2010	1,701		1.9%
2020	1,811		6.5%
U.S. Decennial Census

=== 2010 census ===
As of the census of 2010, there were 1,701 people, 737 households, and 444 families living in the city. The population density was 825.7 inhabitants per square mile (318.8/km^{2}). There were 786 housing units at an average density of 381.6 per square mile (147.3/km^{2}). The racial makeup of the city was 97.6% White, 0.1% African American, 0.9% Native American, 0.1% Asian, 0.6% from other races, and 0.6% from two or more races. Hispanic or Latino of any race were 1.6% of the population.

There were 737 households, of which 32.4% had children under the age of 18 living with them, 44.6% were married couples living together, 11.3% had a female householder with no husband present, 4.3% had a male householder with no wife present, and 39.8% were non-families. 33.6% of all households were made up of individuals, and 17.3% had someone living alone who was 65 years of age or older. The average household size was 2.31 and the average family size was 2.96.

The median age in the city was 38.5 years. 26% of residents were under the age of 18; 7.4% were between the ages of 18 and 24; 25.6% were from 25 to 44; 23.5% were from 45 to 64; and 17.5% were 65 years of age or older. The gender makeup of the city was 47.5% male and 52.5% female.

=== 2000 census ===
As of the census of 2000, there were 1,669 people, 721 households, and 451 families living in the city. The population density was 809.5 people per square mile (312.8/km^{2}). There were 761 housing units at an average density of 369.1 per square mile (142.6/km^{2}). The racial makeup of the city was 99.28% White, 0.06% African American, 0.36% Native American, 0.06% Asian, 0.00% Pacific Islander, 0.00% from other races, and 0.24% from two or more races. 0.36% of the population were Hispanic or Latino of any race.

There were 721 households, out of which 28.7% had children under the age of 18 living with them, 49.7% were married couples living together, 9.4% had a female householder with no husband present, and 37.4% were non-families. 32.6% of all households were made up of individuals, and 19.0% had someone living alone who was 65 years of age or older. The average household size was 2.25 and the average family size was 2.84.

In the city, the population was spread out, with 23.9% under the age of 18, 7.8% from 18 to 24, 26.5% from 25 to 44, 18.7% from 45 to 64, and 23.1% who were 65 years of age or older. The median age was 39 years. For every 100 females, there were 87.3 males. For every 100 females age 18 and over, there were 82.2 males.

The median income for a household in the city was $34,493, and the median income for a family was $40,819. Males had a median income of $28,934 versus $21,838 for females. The per capita income for the city was $18,512. 5.7% of the population and 2.9% of families were below the poverty line. 6.3% of those under the age of 18 and 7.7% of those 65 and older were living below the poverty line.

== Gallery ==
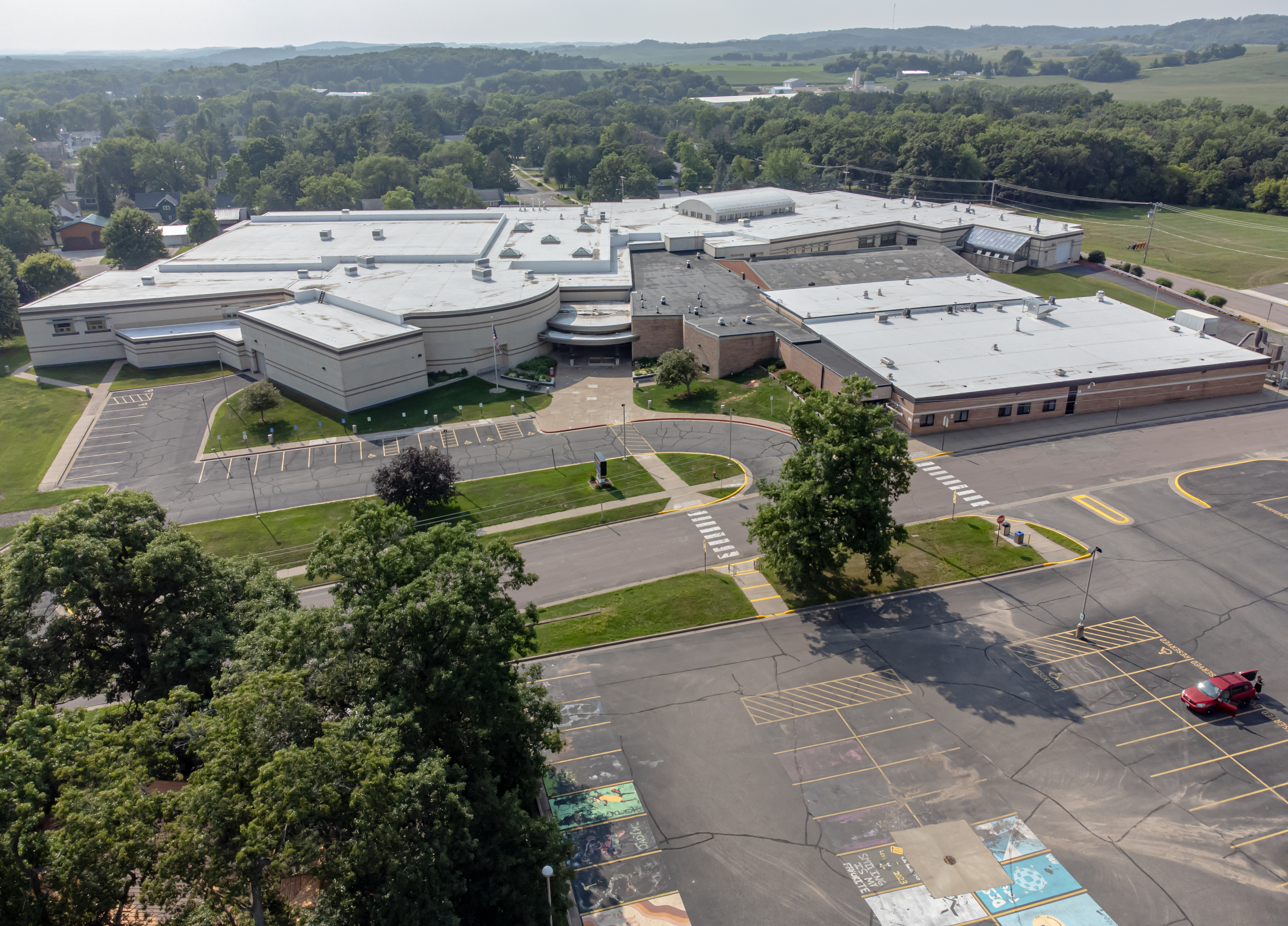
Osseo-Fairchild schools

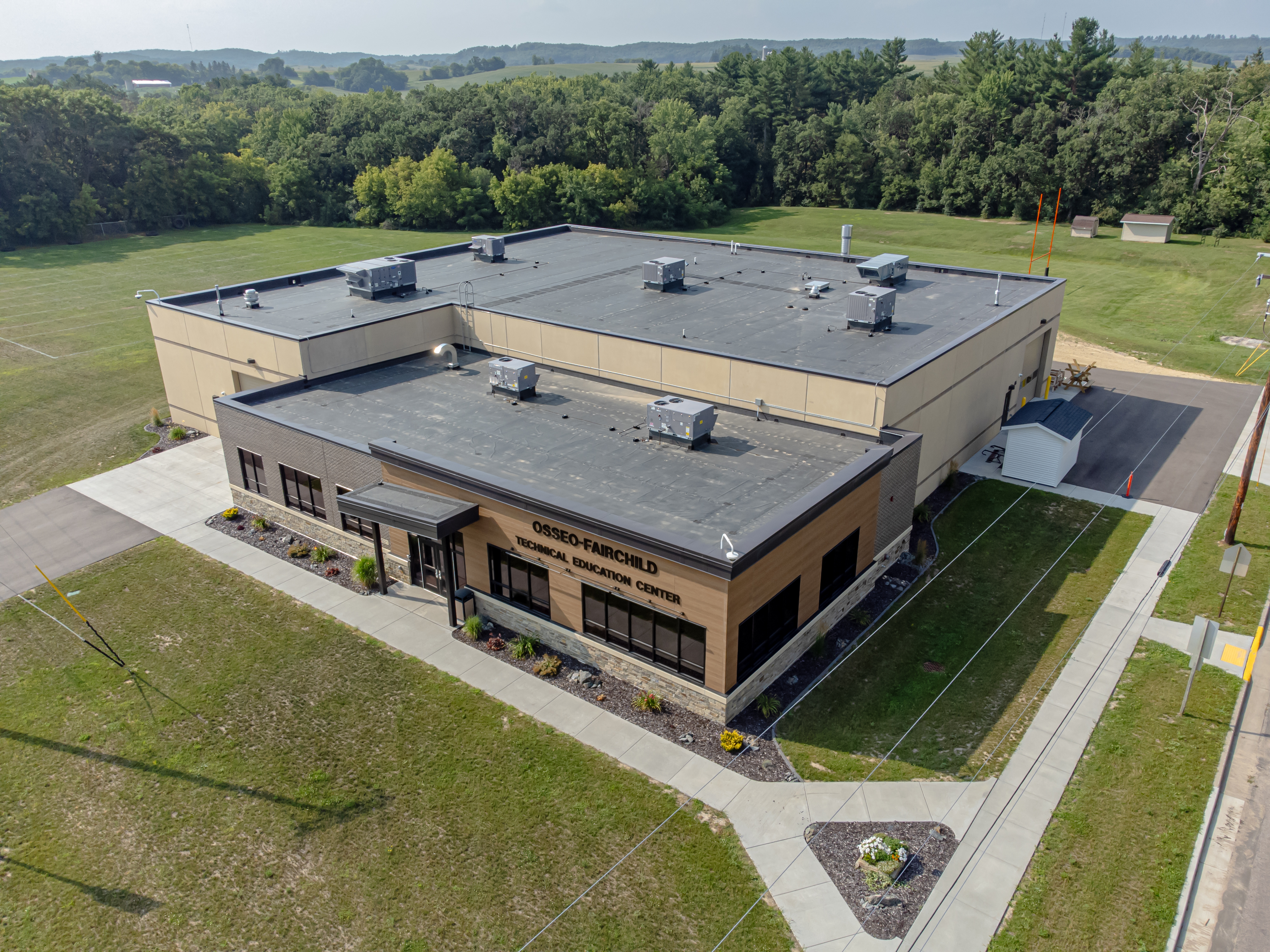
Osseo-Fairchild Technical Education Center

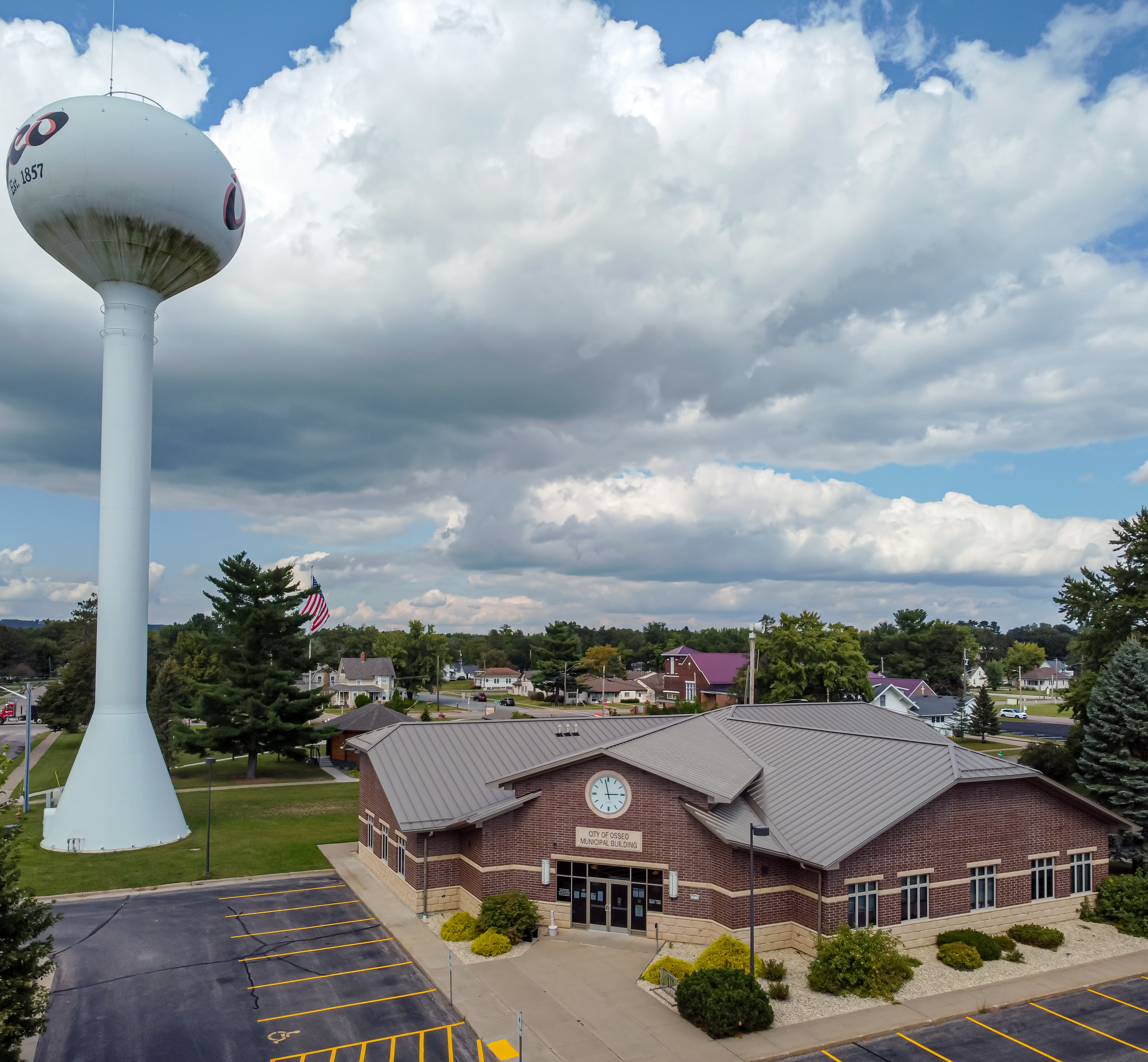
Osseo City Hall

== Notable people ==
- Steve Gunderson, former Republican congressman
- Chauncey E. Heath, Wisconsin State Representative
- Diane Hendricks, billionaire co-founder and chairwoman of ABC Supply
- James L. Linderman, Wisconsin State Representative
- Tom Lomsdahl, Wisconsin State Representative
