= Leo T. Niemuth =

American politician

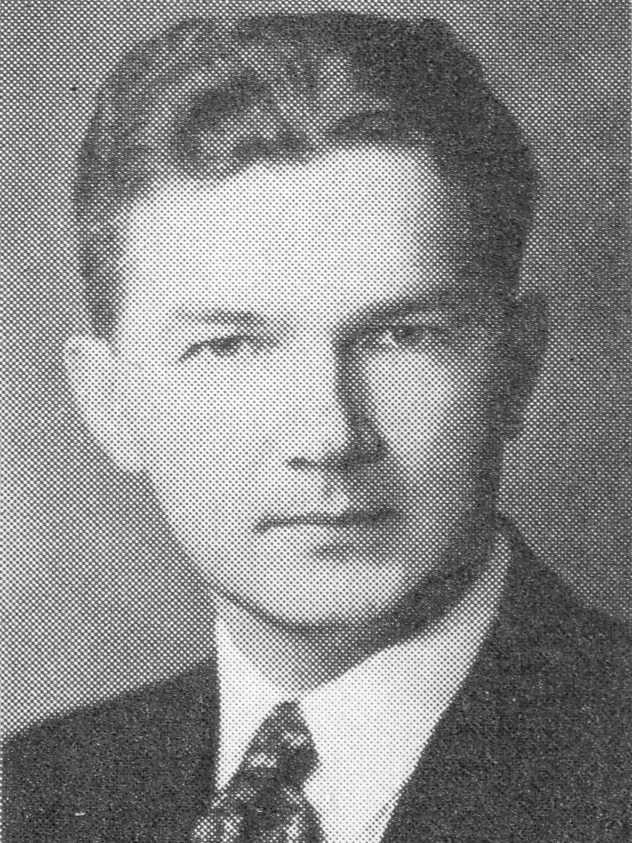
Niemuth circa 1940

Leo T. Niemuth (April 17, 1904, in Oshkosh, Wisconsin – September 5, 1997), was a member of the Wisconsin State Assembly.

== Career ==
Niemuth was a member of the Assembly from 1937 to 1942. He was a Republican.
