= Peter Pyszczynski =

20th century American politician

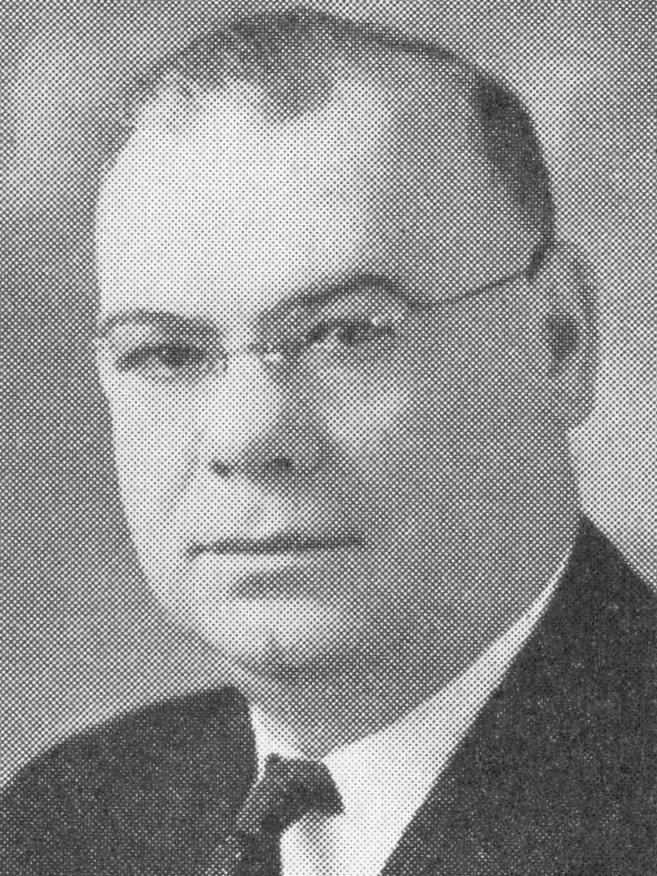
Pysczynski circa 1940

Peter Pysczynski (June 27, 1892 – November 20, 1946) was a member of the Wisconsin State Assembly.

== Biography ==
Pysczynski was born on June 27, 1892, in Milwaukee, Wisconsin. He was a member of Modern Woodmen of America. Pyszczynski died on November 20, 1946.

== Career ==
Pyszczynski was a member of the Assembly from 1937 until his death. He was a Democrat.
