= Ernest Sauld =

American businessman and politician

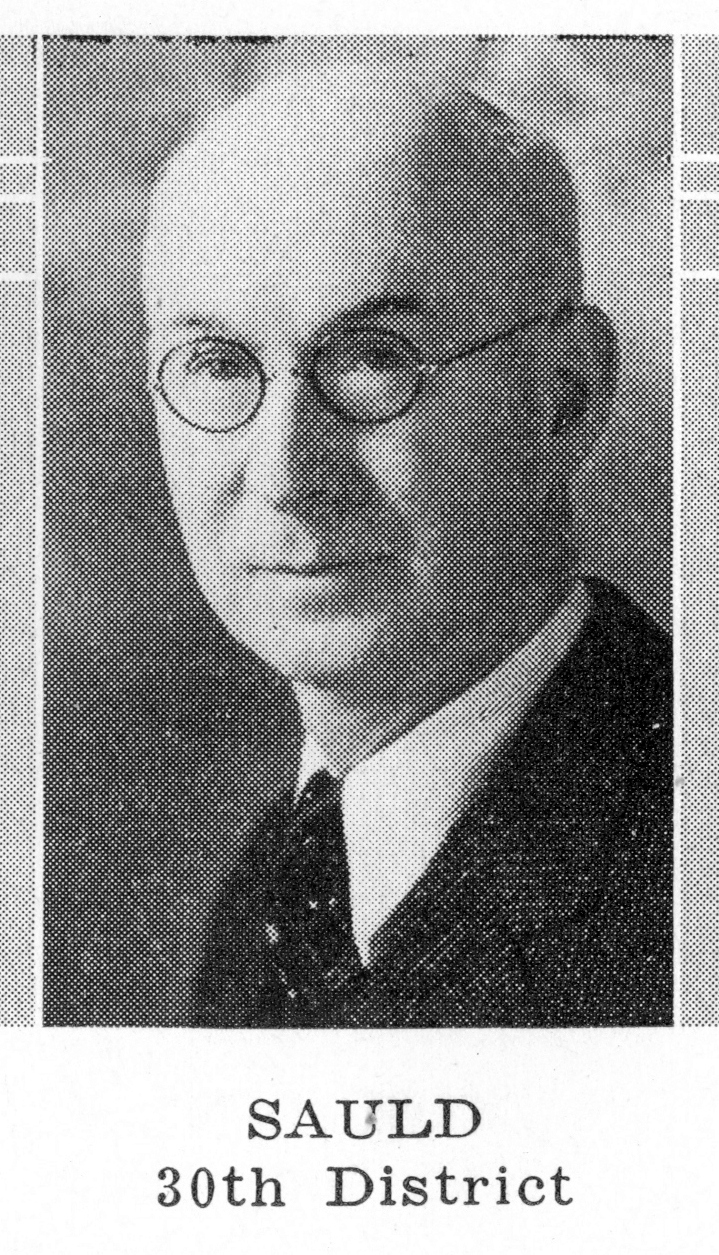
Ernest George Sauld

Ernest George Sauld (July 4, 1884 – December 10, 1959) was an American businessman and politician.

Born in the Grand Duchy of Luxembourg, he graduated from Iron Mountain High School in Iron Mountain, Michigan. Sauld was in the hotel and real estate business and was a merchant in Pembine, Wisconsin. He served in local government. Sauld served in the Wisconsin State Senate from 1937 to 1941 as a Democrat. He died in Pembine, Wisconsin.
