= Oliver H. Fritz =

20th century American politician

Oliver Fritz

Member of the Wisconsin House of Representatives
- In office 1937–1939

Personal details
- Born: November 20, 1905
- Died: December 1, 1985 (aged 80) San Diego, California
- Party: Wisconsin Progressive Party

Oliver H. Fritz (November 20, 1905 – December 1, 1985) was a member of the Wisconsin State Assembly.

== Biography ==
Fritz was born on November 20, 1905. From 1928 to 1933, he served in what is now the Wisconsin Army National Guard. He held the rank of sergeant. He died on December 1, 1985, in San Diego, California.

== Assembly career ==
Fritz was a member of the Assembly during the 1937 session. He was affiliated with the Wisconsin Progressive Party.
