= Pembine, Wisconsin =

Pembine, Wisconsin Pemene Won Bon
- Town
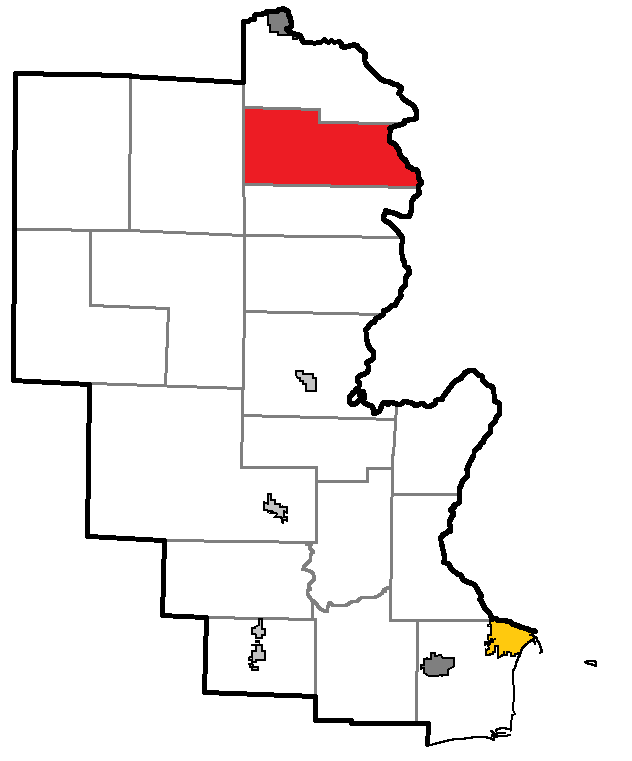
- Location of Pembine, within Marinette County
- Interactive map of Pembine, Wisconsin
- Coordinates: 45°38′24″N 87°56′54″W
- State: Wisconsin
- County: Marinette
- Town of Pembine: April 14, 1914

Government
  - Type: Town
  - Town Chairman: Ross Bole
  - Town Supervisor: Brad Reabe
  - Town Supervisor: Mark Willis

Area
  - Total: 67.3 sq mi (174.4 km^{2})
  - Land: 66.3 sq mi (171.8 km^{2})
  - Water: 1.0 sq mi (2.6 km^{2})
- Elevation: 840 ft (256 m)

Population (2020)
  - Total: 877
  - Density: 13.2/sq mi (5.10/km^{2})
- Time zone: UTC-6 (Central (CST))
  - Summer (DST): UTC-5 (CDT)
- ZIP Code: 54156
- Area codes: 715 & 534
- FIPS code: 55-61775
- GNIS feature ID: 1583905
- Website: Official website

Pembine is a town in Marinette County, Wisconsin, United States. The population was 877 at the 2020 census. The unincorporated community of Kremlin is located in the town, The census-designated place of Pembine is also located in the town.

== Geography ==
According to the United States Census Bureau, the town has a total area of 67.3 square miles (174.4 km^{2}), of which 66.3 square miles (171.8 km^{2}) is land and 1.0 square mile (2.6 km^{2}) (1.47%) is water. The Pemebonwon River, with Long Slide Falls, is in the immediate vicinity. Another notable waterfall, Twelve Foot Falls, is located in the town of Dunbar on the nearby Pike River.

== History ==
The name Pembine comes from the Native American name Pemene Won Bon, also the source of the name of the Pemebonwon River. The Soo Line connected the town by rail in 1887. Pembine was part of the town of Amberg until April 14, 1914, when it was established as a separate town. The economy of Pembine was based on the softwood logging industry, and the town declined after the Wisconsin and Michigan Railroad went bankrupt in 1912 and then discontinued service in 1915. The local economy then switched to potato farming, followed by growth in the dairy industry.

=== Milwaukee & Soo railroads junction ===
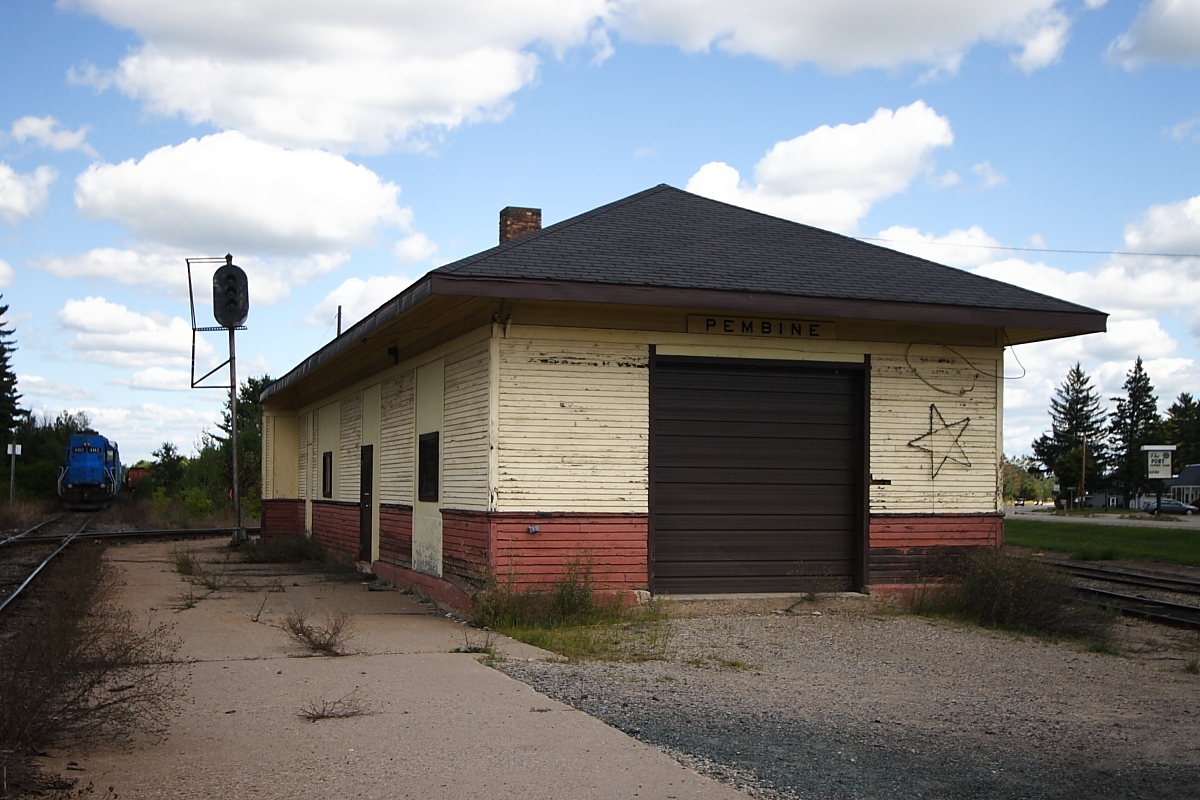
Pembine's train depot, built in 1887, as it appeared in 2011. It was destroyed by fire in 2019.

Several fatal rail disasters occurred in Pembine. In 1899, two railroad workers were killed in a collision between two trains. A head-on collision between two trains in 1902 killed three men. The Soo Line was sabotaged in 1909, killing an engineer. Five people were killed when a train hit a fallen tree in 1913 and derailed.

The historic Pembine union train station (Milwaukee Road & Soo Line), built in 1887, was totally destroyed by fire on June 17, 2019. Two local teenage boys were arrested in connection with the fire.

== Demographics ==
Historical population
Census	Pop.	Note	%±
2000	1,036		—
2020	877		—
U.S. Decennial Census

As of the census of 2000, there were 1,036 people, 429 households, and 293 families residing in the town. The population density was 15.6 inhabitants per square mile (6.0/km^{2}). There were 871 housing units at an average density of 13.1 per square mile (5.1/km^{2}). The racial makeup of the town was 97.59% White, 0.19% Black or African American, 0.29% Native American, 0.58% Asian, 0.29% from other races, and 1.06% from two or more races. Hispanic or Latino of any race were 1.35% of the population.

There were 429 households, out of which 25.4% had children under the age of 18 living with them, 59.0% were married couples living together, 4.9% had a female householder with no husband present, and 31.5% were non-families. 28.2% of all households were made up of individuals, and 13.3% had someone living alone who was 65 years of age or older. The average household size was 2.41 and the average family size was 2.94.

In the town, the population was spread out, with 24.6% under the age of 18, 6.9% from 18 to 24, 24.9% from 25 to 44, 23.9% from 45 to 64, and 19.7% who were 65 years of age or older. The median age was 42 years. For every 100 females, there were 103.1 males. For every 100 females age 18 and over, there were 103.9 males.

The median income for a household in the town was $34,395, and the median income for a family was $39,479. Males had a median income of $36,810 versus $21,071 for females. The per capita income for the town was $16,459. About 7.0% of families and 8.6% of the population were below the poverty line, including 7.6% of those under age 18 and 3.1% of those age 65 or over.

== Government ==
Pembine is governed by a town board composed of three representatives, a chairman and two representatives all elected at large. Town meetings are held the second Tuesday of each month at 6:30 p.m. at the local town hall.

== Education ==
Pembine is served by the Pembine-Beecher-Dunbar Public School District. Pembine High School is the district's high school.

== Churches ==
There are three churches in Pembine: Grace Lutheran Church, Northwoods Chapel, and St. Margaret's Roman Catholic Church. Another congregation, Crossroads Church (an Assembly of God congregation), is located on Highway 141 in nearby Beecher.

== Recreation ==
Pembine is a popular destination for outdoor enthusiasts, with many miles of snowmobiling and ATV trails in the area.

== Notable people ==
- Ernest Sauld (1884–1959), businessman and politician, lived in Pembine
