= Maurice J. Fitzsimons Jr. =

American businessman and politician

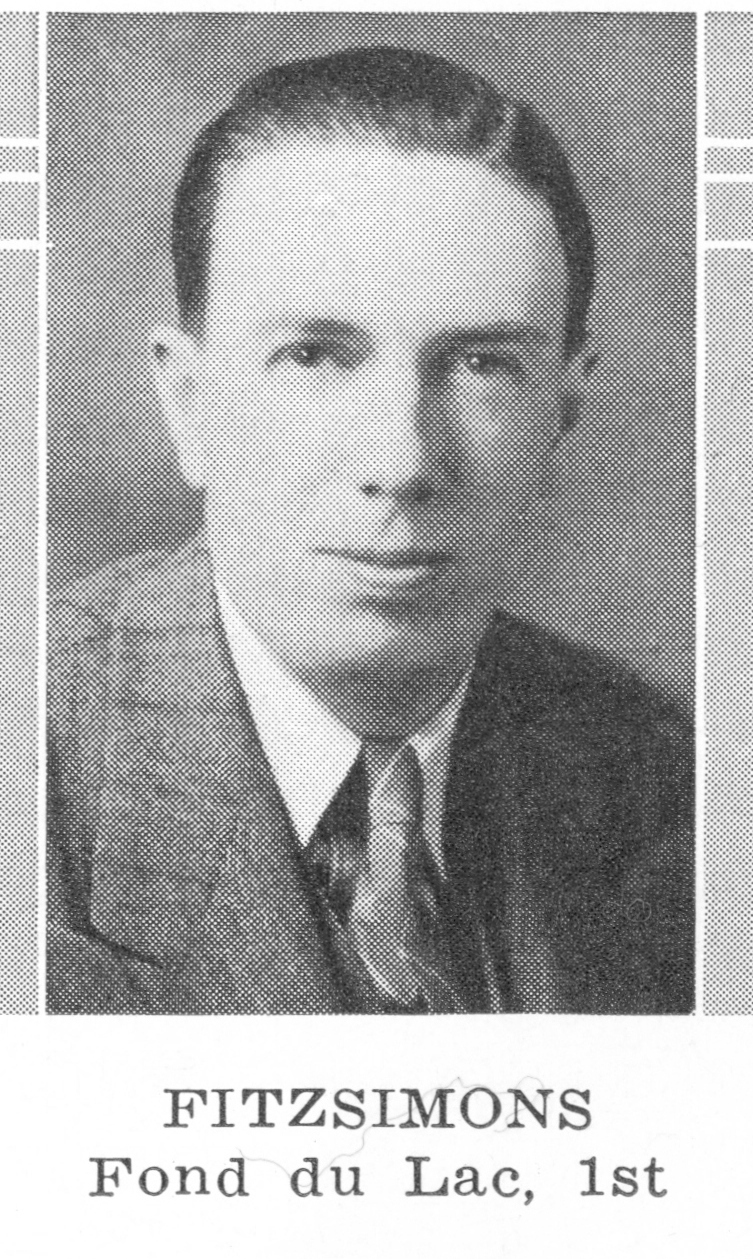
Maurice Fitzsimons

Maurice J. Fitzsimons Jr. (September 30, 1906 – July 11, 1972) was a businessman and politician from Wisconsin.

== Background and career ==
Born in Fond du Lac, Wisconsin, Fitzsimons attended Marquette University. He was president and owner of the M. Fitzsimons Shoe Store. Fitzsimons served as president of the Fond du Lac Vocational School board and was involved with the Fond du Lac Chamber of Commerce. in the Wisconsin State Assembly from 1933 to 1940 and was a Democrat. During World War II, Fitzsimons was a special agent for combat intelligence. He died at the Veterans Administration Hospital in Tomah, Wisconsin.
