= Tom Lomsdahl =

American politician

- Born: August 6, 1874; Søndre Land Municipality, Christians amt (county), Norway
- Died: March 30, 1951 (aged 76)
- Occupations: businessman and politician
- Known for: owner-operator of Tom Lonsdahl & Company
- Notable work: member, Wisconsin State Assembly (1935,1937)
- Political party: Wisconsin Progressive Party
- Spouse: Mary Gunem
- Mother: Maren Andresdtr Lomsdahl (widow)

Tom Lomsdahl (August 6, 1874 – March 30, 1951) was an American businessman and elected official.

Tom Lomsdahl was born in Søndre Land Municipality in Christians amt (county), Norway. At the age of 18, Lomsdahl emigrated to the United States with his widowed mother, Maren Andresdtr Lomsdahl. His mother subsequently married Erick C Hagen, a widower from Søndre Land. The family settled in Trempealeau County, Wisconsin. Tom Lomsdahl was married to Mary Gunem.

Tom Lomsdahl was the owner-operator of Tom Lonsdahl & Company, a dealer in hardware, farm implements, agricultural machinery and automobiles. Lomsdahl was also involved in the telephone, banking, and grain elevator businesses. Lomsdahl served on the town and village boards of Osseo, Wisconsin and was president of the city council. Lomsdahl was elected from the Wisconsin Progressive Party to serve in the Wisconsin State Assembly in 1935 and 1937.
