= Robert H. Roche =

American farmer and politician

Robert H. Roche (October 1, 1891 – February 4, 1981) was an American farmer and politician.

Born in Doylestown, Columbia County, Wisconsin, Roche went to Columbus High School, in Columbus, Wisconsin. He was a farmer. From 1933 to 1937, Roche served as sheriff of Columbia County and was a Democrat. In 1937, Roche served in the Wisconsin Assembly. Roche died at the Columbus Community Hospital in Columbus, Wisconsin.
