= P. Bradley McIntyre =

American politician

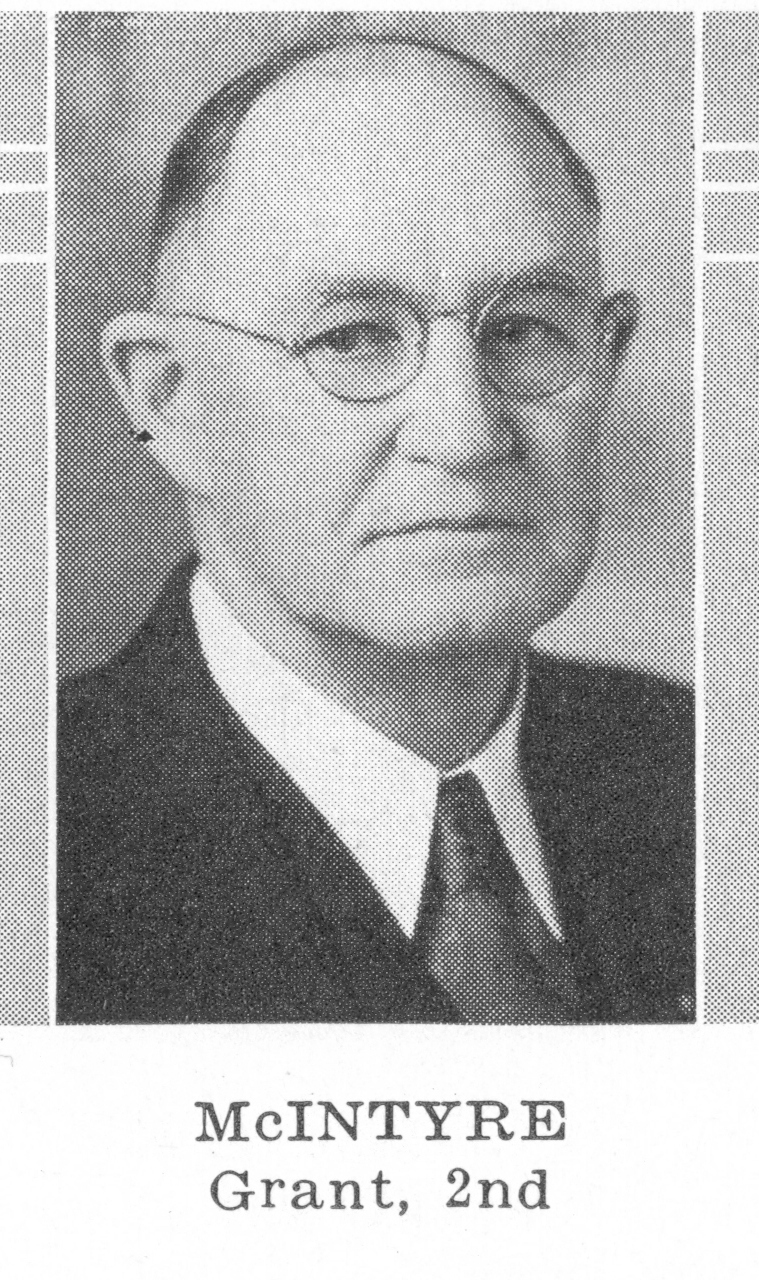
P. Bradley McIntyre

Peter Bradley McIntyre (February 9, 1872 – April 20, 1952) was a member of the Wisconsin State Assembly.

== Biography ==
McIntyre was born on February 9, 1872, in Muscoda, Wisconsin. He went on to work for the Federal Land Bank. He married Sarah Elizabeth Chandler in 1897.

== Political career ==
McIntyre was a member of the Assembly from 1937 to 1944. Previously, he was Clerk of Muscoda from 1897 to 1908 and Chairman of Muscoda in 1904. He was a Republican.
