= Walter J. Rush =

American lawyer and politician

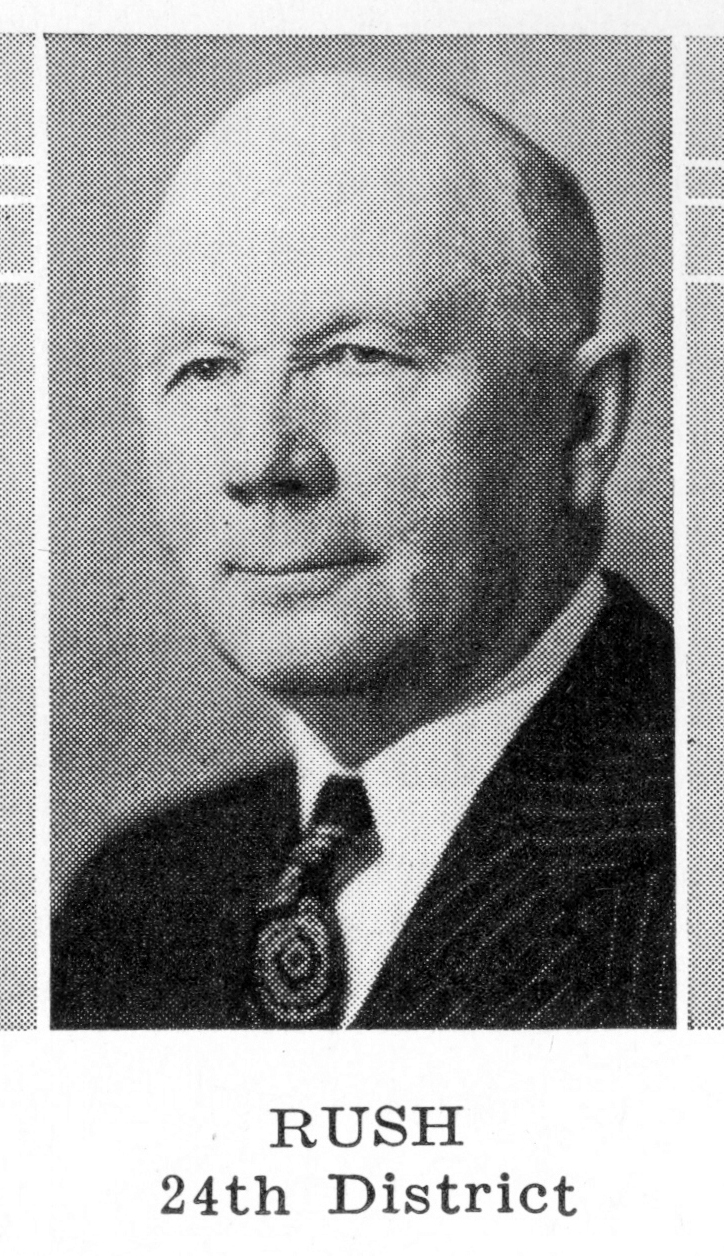
Walter J. Rush

Walter J. Rush (April 22, 1871 – April 16, 1961) was a member of the Wisconsin State Senate. From 1929 to 1940, Rush represented the 24th district, which at the time included Taylor, Wood, and Clark counties. Rush was associated with the Progressives of the La Follette family.

Rush received his bachelor's degree from Valparaiso University. He then taught school and then received his law degree from the University of Wisconsin Law School in 1900. He then practiced law.

Rush was district attorney of Clark County, Wisconsin from 1911 to 1918 and was a delegate to the 1928 Republican National Convention. He later helped organize the Wisconsin Progressive Party. Rush was born in Waterford, Wisconsin and later resided in Neillsville, Wisconsin for over 60 years.

In 1931, Rush was chosen as chairman of the legislative interim committee on banking.

In January 1937, Rush narrowly won the post of president pro tempore of the Senate, with a vote of 17–16. In 1937, Rush also served as chairman of the Senate committee on corporations and taxation.
