= Wisconsin Highway 169 =

State highway in Wisconsin

State Trunk Highway 169
- WIS 169 highlighted in red

Route information
- Maintained by WisDOT
- Length: 17.36 mi (27.94 km)

Major junctions
- South end: WIS 13 in Mellen
- North end: US 2 / LSCT in Cedar

Location
- Country: United States
- State: Wisconsin
- Counties: Ashland, Iron

Highway system
- Wisconsin State Trunk Highway System; Interstate; US; State; Scenic; Rustic
← WIS 168	→ WIS 170

State Trunk Highway 169 (often called Highway 169, STH-169 or WIS 169) is a state highway in the US state of Wisconsin. It runs in north–south in northwest Wisconsin from Mellen to near Gurney. It helps accommodate traffic to the scenic Copper Falls State Park just northeast of its termination in Mellen.

== Route description ==
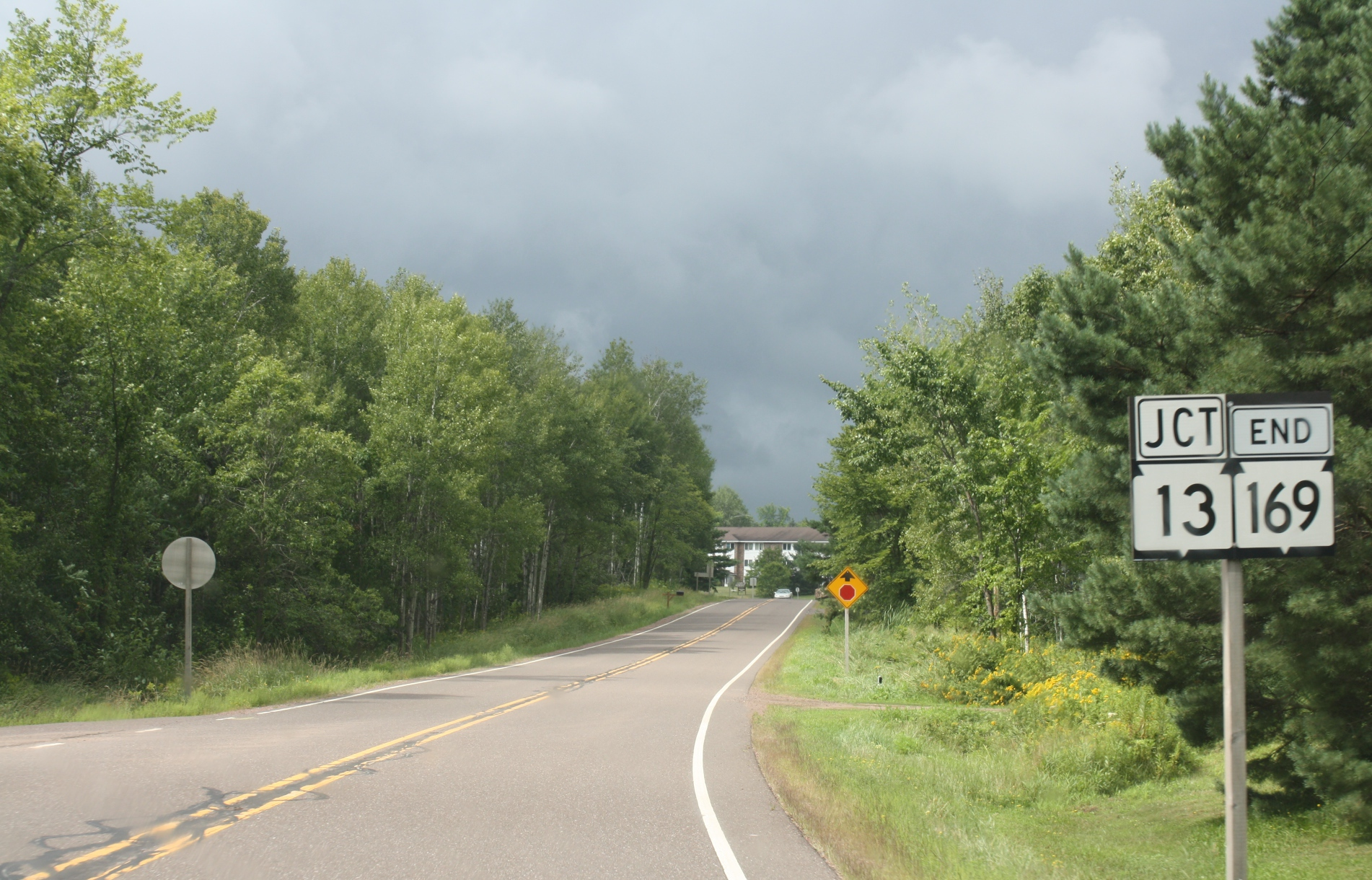
Southern terminus

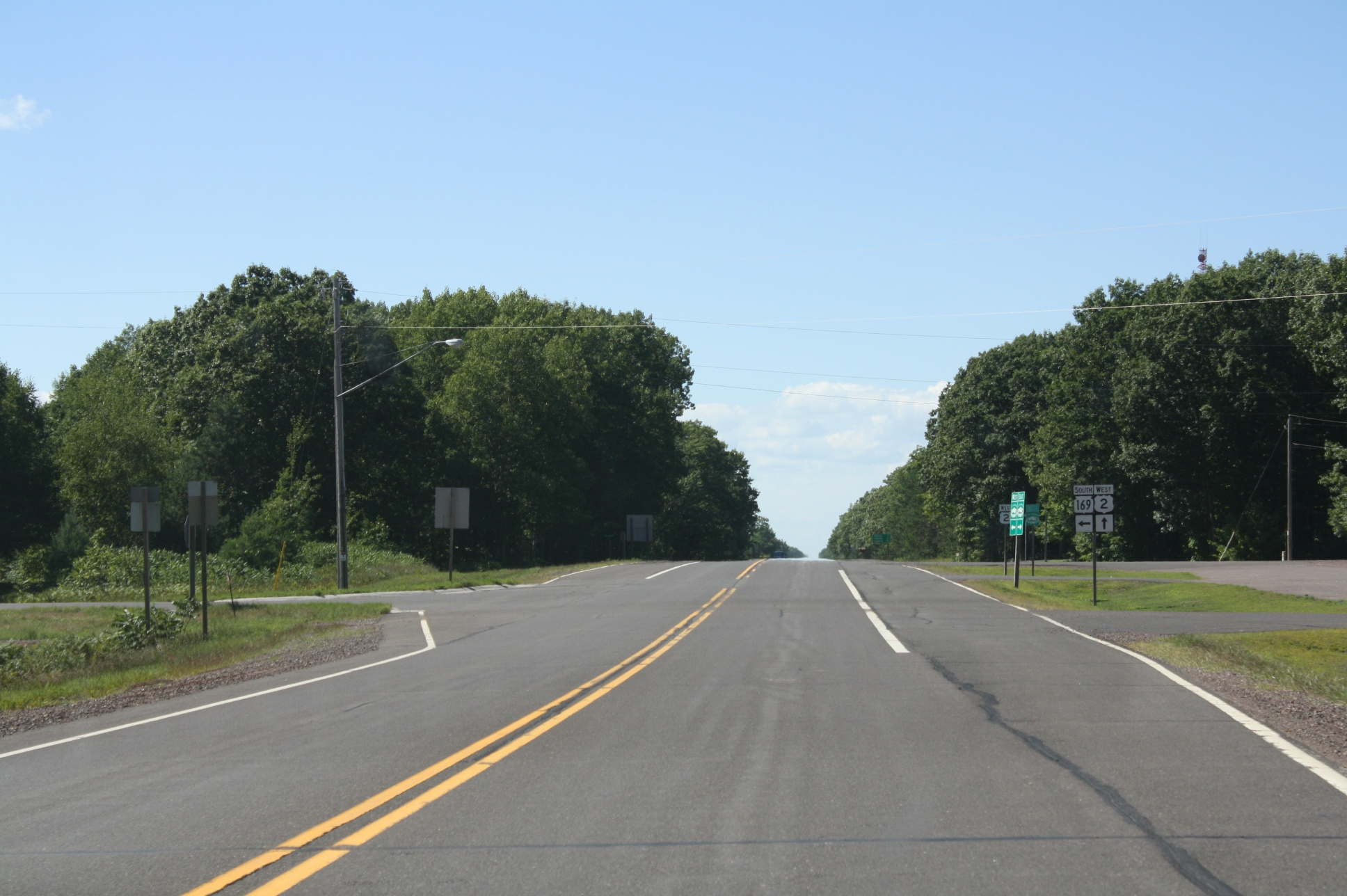
Northern terminus

The highway starts at its southern terminus on the northeast side of Mellen at WIS 13. It follows Copper Drive falls over the Bad River and turn northward along the eastern edge of Copper Falls State Park. The highway turns eastward to leave the vicinity of the park before alternating east and northward through rural Ashland County. WIS 169 crosses the Tyler Forks on one of these northbound sections before turning east to run along the border of the Bad River Reservation. The highway curves northeasterly and clips the southeastern corner of the reservation before crossing into Iron County. The highway continues northward across the Potato River and through the community of Gurney before terminating at US Highway 2 (US 2) northwest of Cedar.

== History ==
The original STH-169 was located in Sparta and tracked northeast toward Angelo and then to Fort McCoy. Commissioned in 1940, this original route only lasted seven years before being renumbered to present WIS 21. In 1956, the second STH-169 was commissioned, replacing the original County Trunk Highway K that went from Mellen to US 2 outside of Cedar and also giving easier access to Copper Falls State Park.

== Major intersections ==
County	Location	mi	km	Destinations	Notes
Ashland	Mellen	0.00	0.00	WIS 13 (Main Street) – Ashland, Park Falls	Southern terminus
Iron	Cedar	17.36	27.94	US 2 / LSCT – Ashland, Ironwood	Northern terminus
1.000 mi = 1.609 km; 1.000 km = 0.621 mi
