= Robert F. Barabe =

American politician

Robert Barabe

Member of the Wisconsin State Assembly
- In office 1959–1964

Mayor of Mellen, Wisconsin
- In office 1955–1959
- In office 1969–1971; 1955–1959

Personal details
- Born: June 14, 1917 Mellen, Wisconsin
- Died: January 15, 1971 (aged 54) Mellen, Wisconsin
- Party: Democratic

Military service
- Branch/service: United States Army
- Battles/wars: World War II

Robert F. Barabe (June 14, 1917 – January 15, 1971) was an American politician who served as a member of the Wisconsin State Assembly and two-time mayor of Mellen, Wisconsin.

== Early life and education ==
Barabe was born in Mellen, Wisconsin. He attended the University of Wisconsin.

== Career ==
During World War II, Barabe served in the 10th Armored Division (3rd Tank Battalion) of the United States Army and he later became a member of the American Legion. and the Veterans of Foreign Wars. During his service in WWII he earned 2 Bronze Stars.

Barabe was elected to the Assembly in 1958 and was re-elected in 1960 and 1962. Previously, he was a member of the Ashland County, Wisconsin Board from 1947 to 1949 and Mayor of Mellen from 1955 to 1959 and 1969 to 1971, as well as an alderman in Mellen. He was a member of the Democratic Party.

== Personal life ==
Barabe has a son, Joseph Barabe, who also served two stints as mayor of Mellen, from 1987 to 2001 and 2003 to 2022. Joseph Barabe is also a member of the Democratic Party.

Barabe died of a heart attack while serving as mayor on January 15, 1971.
