= Copper Falls State Park =

State park in Ashland County, Wisconsin

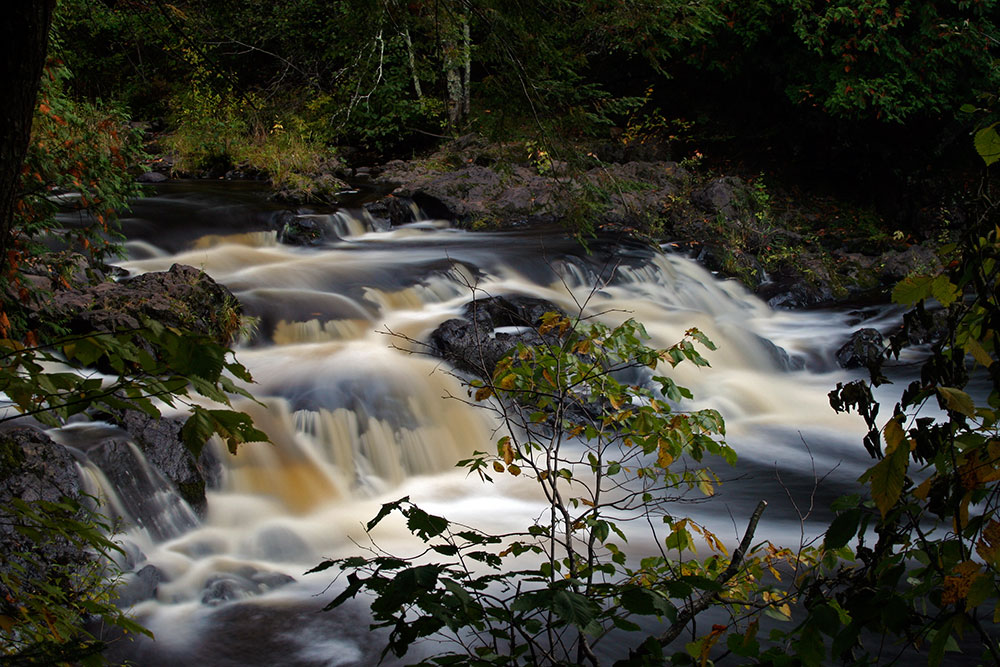
- Copper Falls

- Location within Wisconsin Location within the United States
- Interactive map of Copper Falls State Park
- Location: Ashland County, Wisconsin, United States
- Coordinates: 46°22′35″N 90°38′36″W
- Area: 3,068 acres (1,242 ha)
- Elevation: 1,030 ft (310 m)
- Established: 1929
- Administrator: Wisconsin Department of Natural Resources
- Website: Official website
- Wisconsin State Parks
- Copper Falls State Park
- U.S. National Register of Historic Places
- Location: WI 169, 1.8 mi. NE of Mellen
- Nearest city: Morse, Wisconsin
- Built: 1929–1953
- Architect: Bernard Herber Knobla, J.C. Steiro
- NRHP reference No.: 05001425
- Added to NRHP: December 16, 2005

Copper Falls State Park is a state park in Ashland County, Wisconsin, United States. It contains a section of the Bad River and its tributary the Tylers Forks, which flow through a gorge and drop over several waterfalls. Old Copper complex peoples and later European settlers mined copper in the area. The state park was created in 1929 and amenities were developed by the Civilian Conservation Corps and the Works Progress Administration. In 2005, the park was listed on the National Register of Historic Places as a site with 10 contributing properties.

== History ==
Copper Falls Park lies near the west end of the Penokee-Gogebic Mineral Range, a ridge of rock formations that stretches from Ashland County 80 miles to Lake Gogebic in the Upper Peninsula of Michigan. Copper was mined in the area during the Civil War, and in the 1880s there were two copper mines near where the log footbridge now is. Around 1900 Wells M. Ruggles had a crew digging for copper at what is now the southeast corner of the picnic grounds. The Bad River repeatedly filled his shaft with water, so he dynamited rock to divert the river.

Ashland County was heavily logged from 1886 to 1920, stripping both pine and hardwood and leaving a wasteland of stumps and brush. Some of this cutover land was sold to immigrants to farm, but the acidic soil left by pine forests and the short summers of northern Wisconsin made it difficult to grow many crops, and many farms were abandoned by the 1920s and 30s, leaving the area vulnerable to fire and erosion.

In 1907 Ruggles and his Ashland County Land Company sold 130 acres around the falls to investors from St. Louis. In the following years, local efforts were made to improve the site for visitors. The county improved the road to the park, and in 1922 WWI vets Nick Stilin and Henry Kritz built three swinging footbridges for viewing the falls. During summers, Mr. and Mrs. August Froming sold food and drink at the falls.

The state of Wisconsin bought 520 acres at the falls in 1929 and additional land in 1935. Starting in 1933, Mayor Maxeiner of Mellen and Congressman B.J. Gehrmann pushed the Conservation Commission in Madison to assign a Civilian Conservation Corps (CCC) camp to develop a park at Copper Falls. In 1935, a master plan for a park was completed by a team of surveyors, landscape architects, architects and engineers from various government agencies. The park was a challenge to design, since the roads and trails had to work around the river gorges and ravines.

CCC Company D-692 moved into Camp Copper Falls in November 1935. They were 164 men - mostly young men from Illinois - including masons, carpenters, furniture makers, and blacksmiths. Before Copper Falls, they had worked on Giant City State Park in southern Illinois. In the following 23 months they built Copper Falls' recreational lodge, its granite fireplaces, its benches and tables. They started building the contact station, built a pump house, built water reservoirs, built the observation tower, laid water lines, and ran telephone and electric lines. They cleared areas for parking, camping and picnicking. They cleared park trails and roads (removing many stumps in the process), built log footbridges, and lots of guardrail. In the summer of 1936 northern Wisconsin saw a bad drought, and the CCCs focused on fire suppression in the surrounding area. The camp closed in September 1937.

After the CCC left, work continued under the WPA - another New Deal program which employed unemployed local men on public projects. (An unskilled worker made about 50¢ a day.) One CCC foreman remained to supervise the WPA men as they continued the CCC's projects. WPA reports show that they worked on improving the trails, a bathing pond, the custodian's house, a playground, park lights, and tree thinning, and completed the contact station, among other things. The WPA work continued until August 1941, when funds ran out.

A flood of the Bad River on August 30, 1941 damaged the bathing pond, bath house, dressing cabin, and two bridges over the Bad River. Another flood June 24, 1946 destroyed the swimming pond and bathhouse, and wrecked the flight of wooden steps across from the combination building.

== Activities and amenities ==
- Loon Lake: The lake offers swimming, fishing, kayaking, canoeing, and boating with electric motors only. Trout fishing can be found on the Bad River and Tylers Forks.
- Trails: The park has 17 miles (27 km) of trails including a portion of the North Country National Scenic Trail. Trails are used for hiking, biking, cross-country skiing, and snowshoeing.
- Camping: The campground has 24 sites with electric hookups. A camper cabin is accessible to persons with disabilities.

== Gallery ==
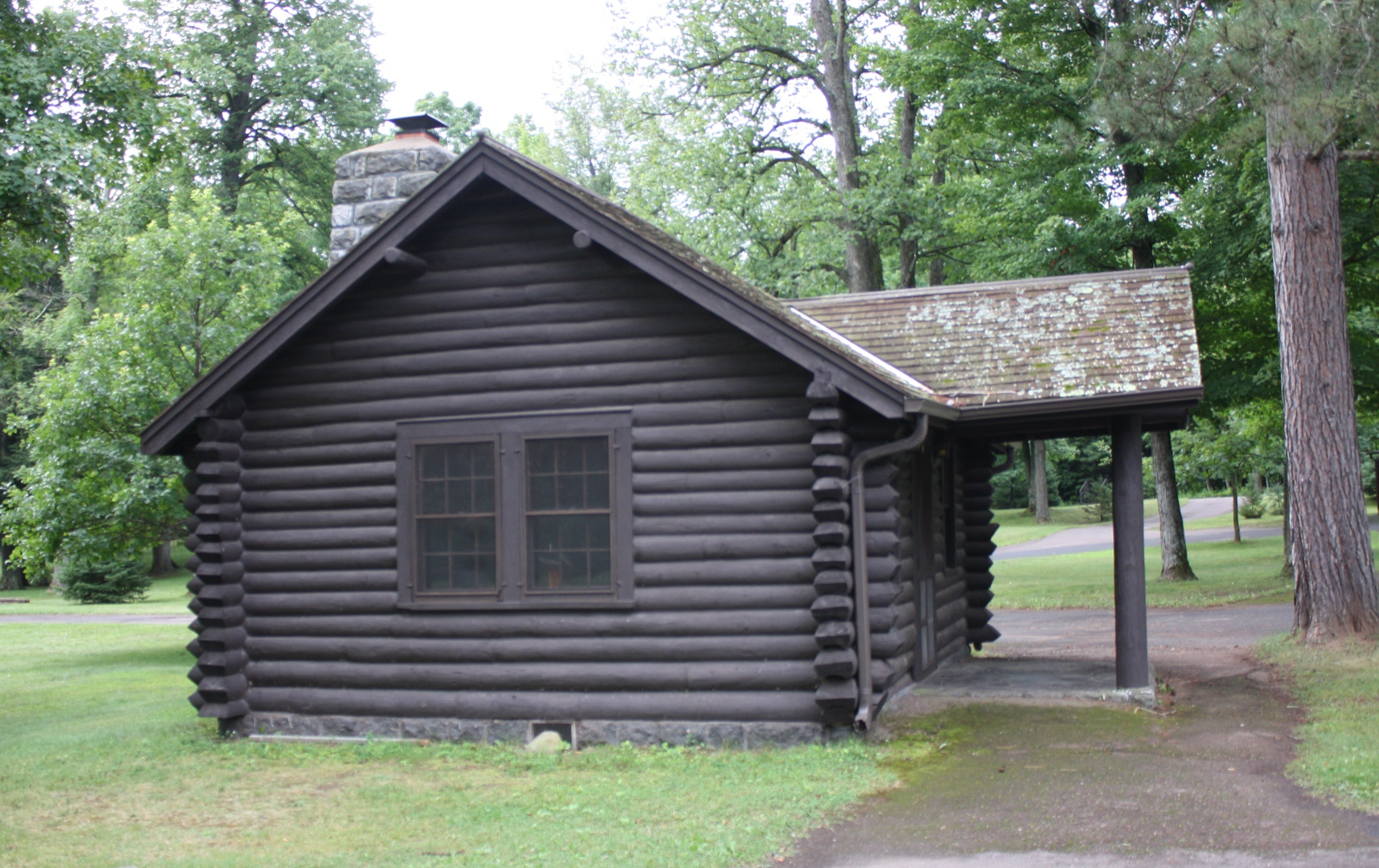
Cabin

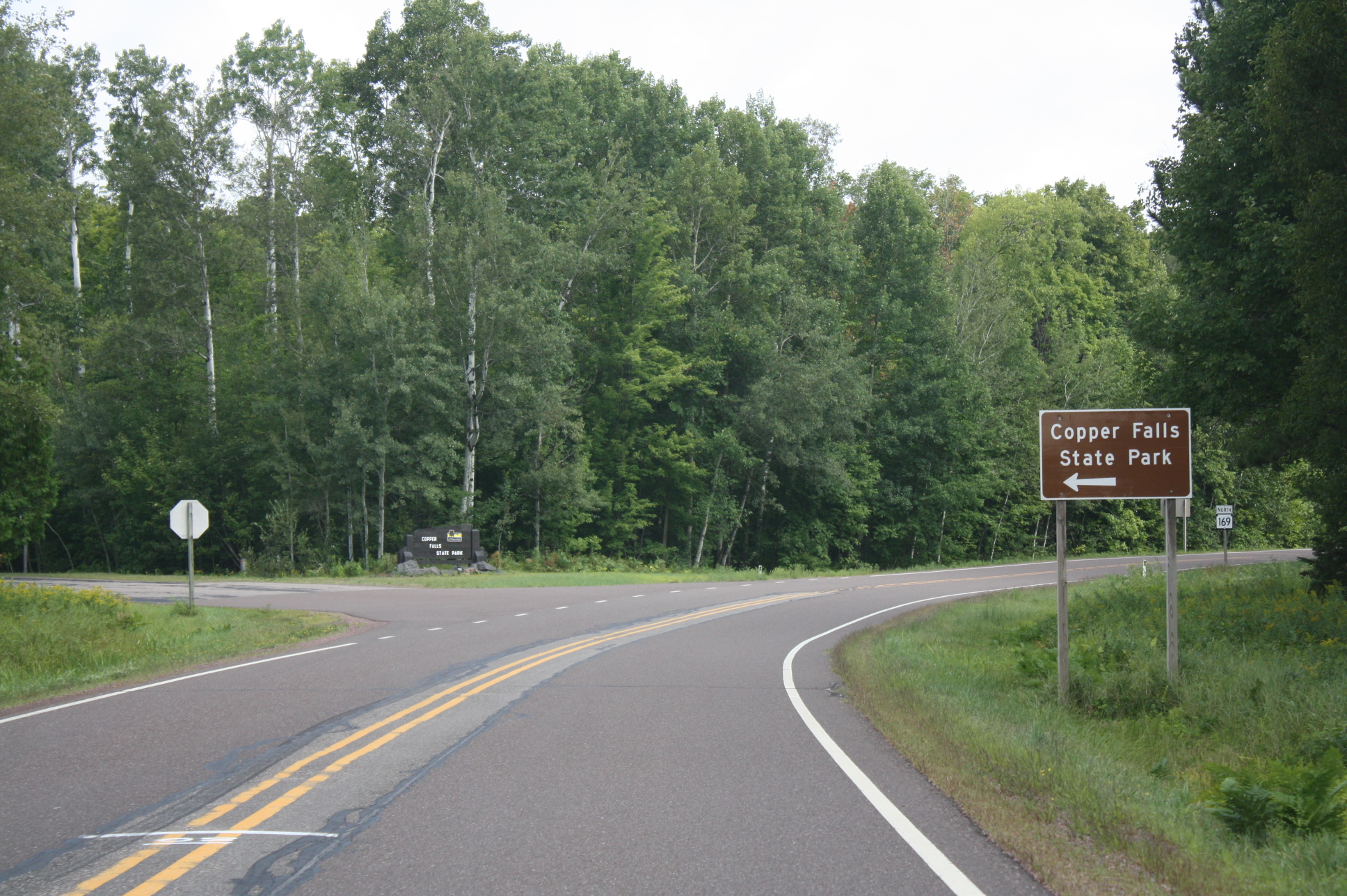
Sign

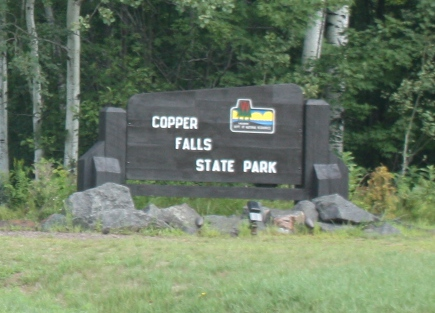
Entrance sign

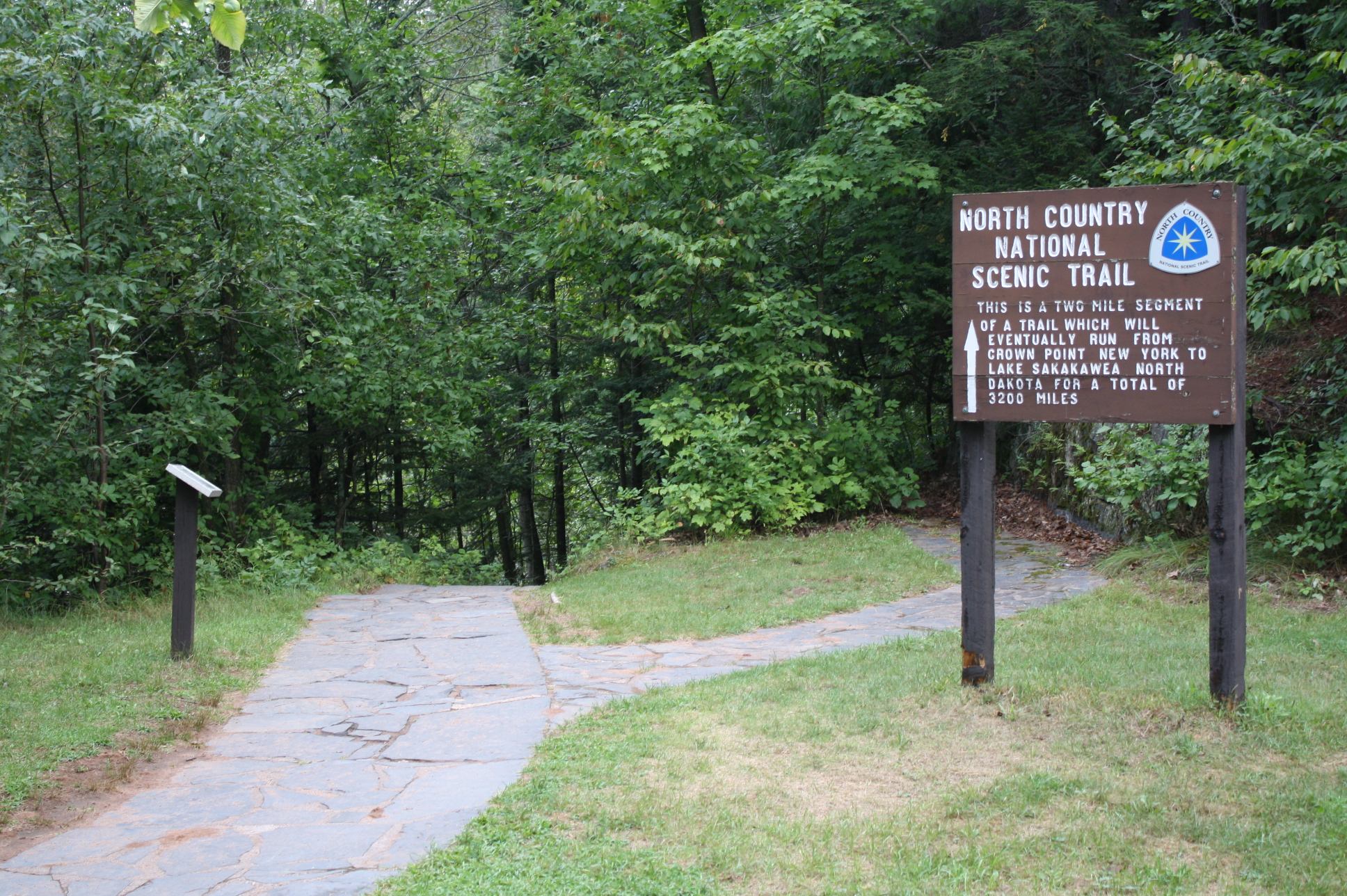
North Country National Scenic Trail

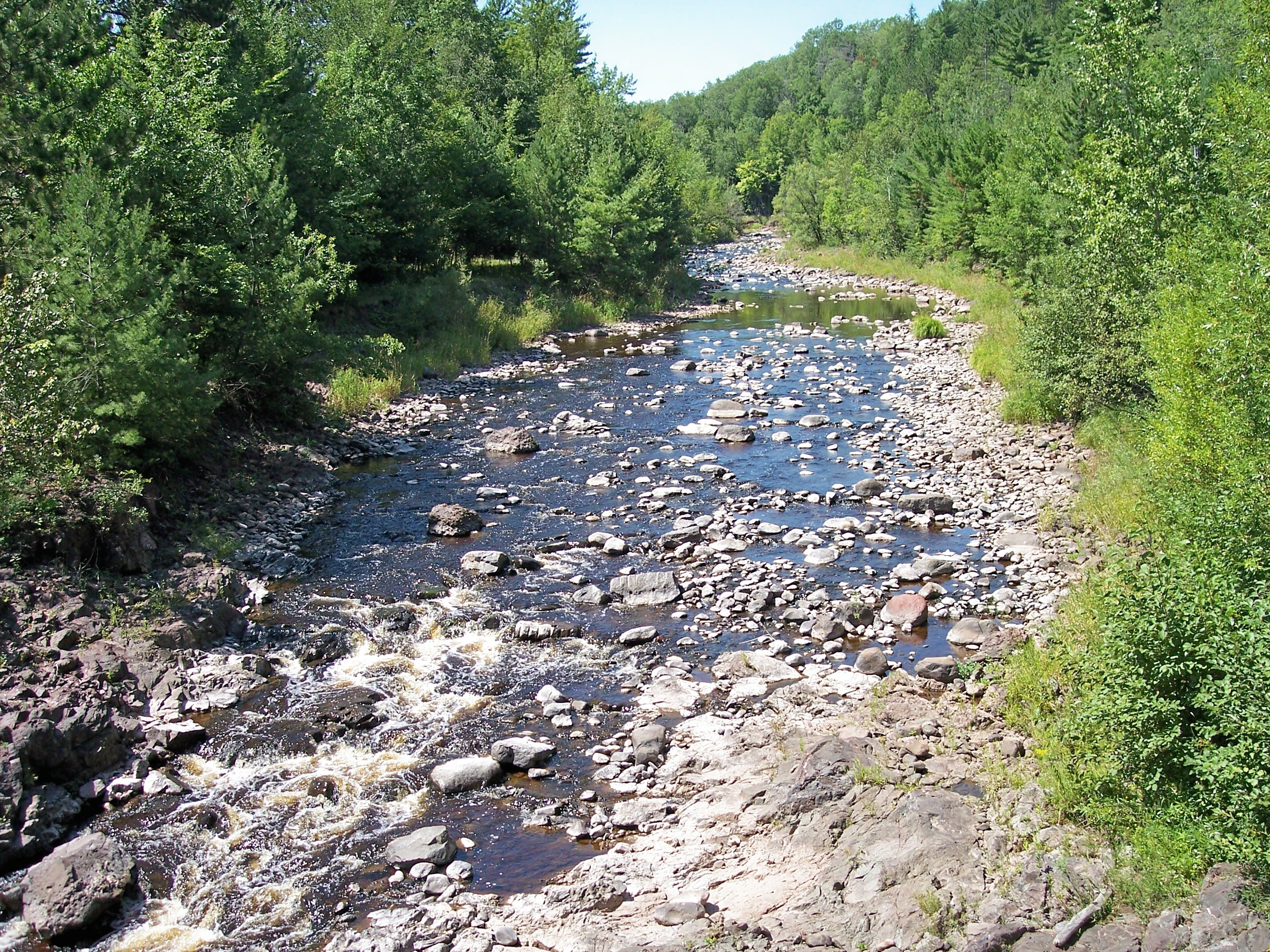
The Bad River in Copper Falls State Park

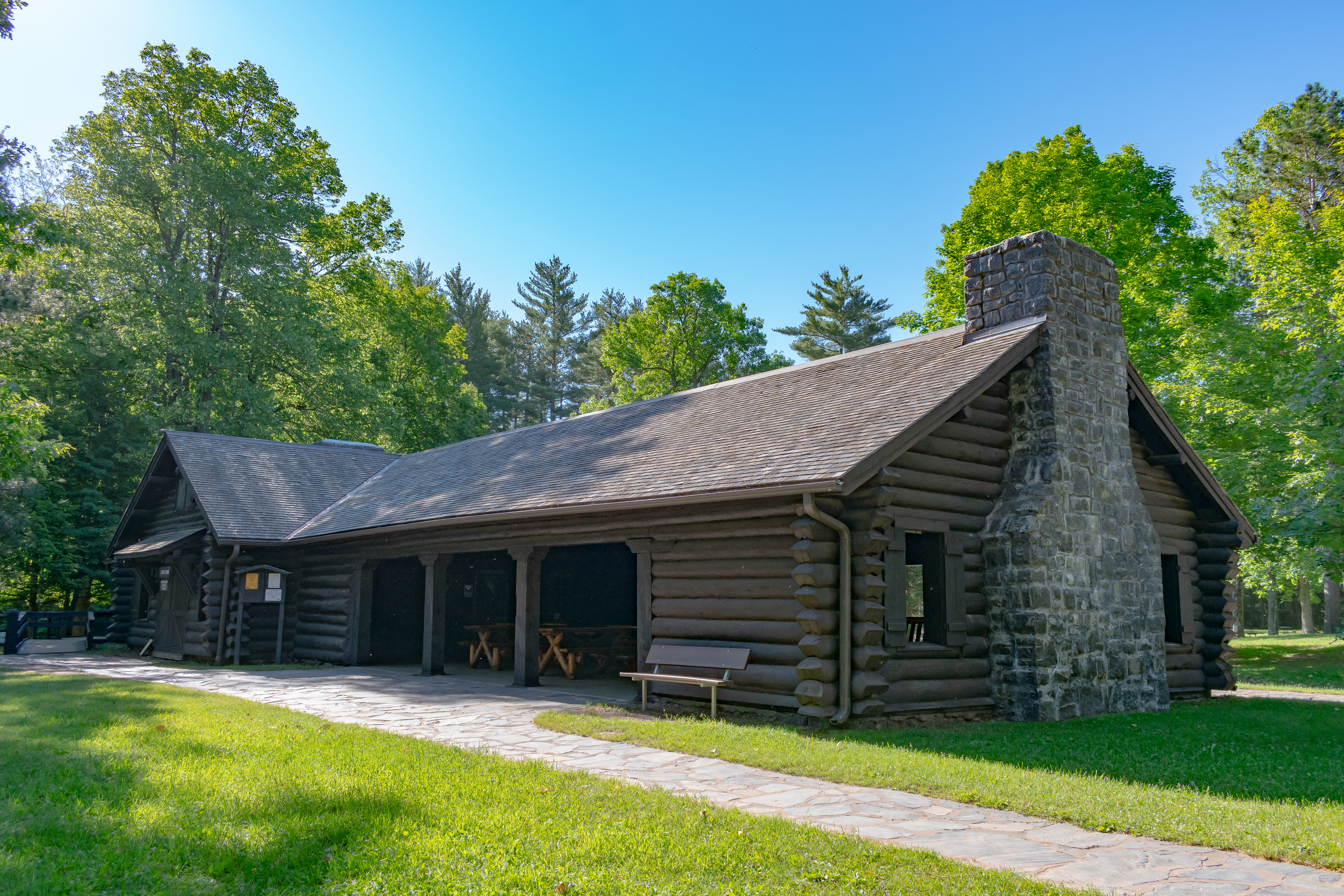
Combination Building and Patio
