= Mellen, Wisconsin =

- City
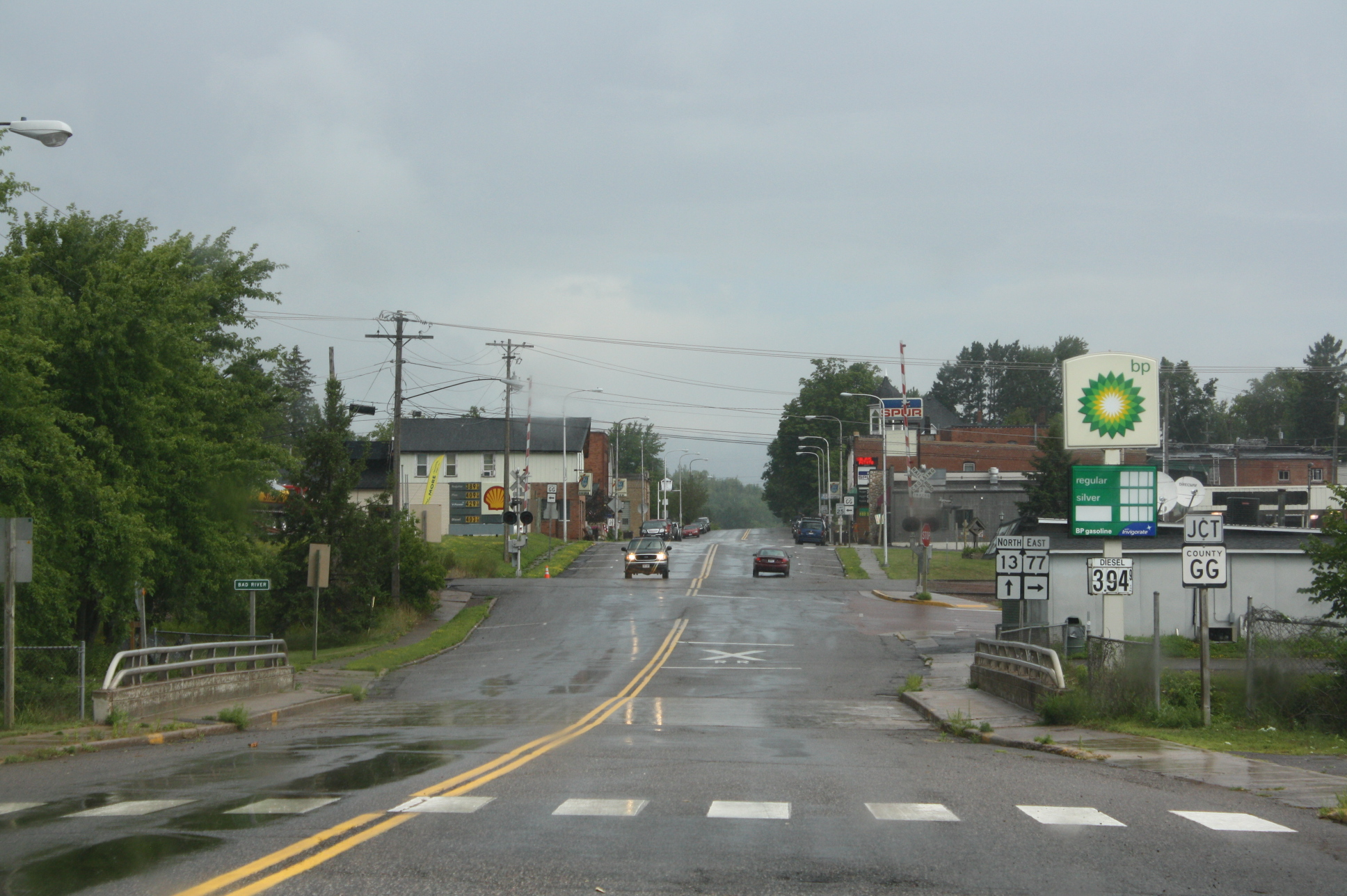
- Looking north in downtown Mellen

- Location of Mellen in Ashland County, Wisconsin.

- Location within Wisconsin Location within the United States
- Coordinates: 46°19′27″N 90°39′33″W
- Country: United States
- State: Wisconsin
- County: Ashland
- Settled: 1886
- Incorporated: March 22, 1907

Government
  - Mayor: Jim Warren

Area
  - Total: 1.86 sq mi (4.82 km^{2})
  - Land: 1.86 sq mi (4.82 km^{2})
  - Water: 0 sq mi (0.00 km^{2})
- Elevation: 1,250 ft (380 m)

Population (2020)
  - Total: 698
  - Estimate (2025): 697
  - Density: 375.1/sq mi (144.81/km^{2})
- Time zone: UTC-6 (Central (CST))
  - Summer (DST): UTC-5 (CDT)
- ZIP code: 54546
- Area codes: 715 & 534
- FIPS code: 55-50700
- GNIS feature ID: 1579857
- Website: www.mellenwi.com

Mellen is a city in Ashland County, Wisconsin, United States. The population was 698 at the 2020 census.

== History ==
Samuel O. Bennett was the first resident of Mellen; he named the new community Iron City, as it was located on the Gogebic Range. The Mellen post office opened in 1887, and the community was officially named Mellen the following year. It was most likely named for Wisconsin Central Railroad general manager William Solon Mellen, though it may have been named after Union Pacific Railroad general manager Charles Sanger Mellen.

== Attractions ==
- Copper Falls State Park is located just north of Mellen.

== Government ==
Mellen has a mayor-council form of government.

According to the Mellen Weekly-Record; Vol.123 No. 29; Wednesday, July 20, 2022, Mayor Joseph A. Barabe, resigned effective at noon, on July 15, 2022. No further explanation was given. Nathaniel Delegan, President of the Mellen City Council, served as Acting Mayor until the election of a new Mayor on April 4, 2023.

The Mellen City Council is considering changing the form of government. Mellen currently has a Mayor-Council form of government. The city council is considering three options. The first option is to remain with the Mayor-Council form of government. The second option is to establish the position of City Administrator, who operates under the Mayor. The third option is to abolish the Office of Mayor and establish a Manager-Council type of government.

In the Wisconsin State Legislature, Mellen is located in the 74th Assembly District, and the 25th Senate District, represented by Assembly Representative Chanz Green and State Senator Romaine Quinn.

In the United States House of Representatives, Mellen is served by Tom Tiffany, of Wisconsin's 7th congressional district.

== Mayors ==
Mayor	Tenure
A.J. Sullivan	1907–1909
John Twomey	1909–1911
M.J. Collins	1911–1911
J.B. Orr	1912–1915
William Knoll	1915–1921
Albert Pribnow	1921–1923
William Knoll	1923–1927
M.J. Donahue	1927–1931
Ray Maxeiner	1931–1937
Vernon Meredith	1937–1949
Henry Bauch	1949–1951
James Dalbesio	1951–1955
Robert F. Barabe	1955–1959
Howard Peters	1959–1969
Robert F. Barabe	1969–1971
L. Roy Lutz	1971–1973
Clayton Landry	1973–1981
Christ Lutz	1981–1983
Robert Holmes III	1983–1987
Joseph Barabe	1987–2001
Dale Smith	2001–2003
Joseph Barabe	2003–2022
Nathaniel Delegan	2022-2023
Terry Van Buren	2023–2025
Jim Warren	2025–present

== Geography ==
Mellen is located at 46°19′27″N 90°39′33″W (46.324288, -90.659295), along the Bad River.

According to the United States Census Bureau, the city has a total area of 1.87 square miles (4.84 km^{2}), all land.

=== Climate ===
Climate data for Mellen 4 NE, Wisconsin, 1991–2020 normals, 1926-2020 extremes: 1300ft (396m)
Month	Jan	Feb	Mar	Apr	May	Jun	Jul	Aug	Sep	Oct	Nov	Dec	Year
Record high °F (°C)	55 (13)	63 (17)	80 (27)	96 (36)	95 (35)	98 (37)	105 (41)	102 (39)	98 (37)	88 (31)	77 (25)	61 (16)	105 (41)
Mean maximum °F (°C)	40.1 (4.5)	48.3 (9.1)	60.6 (15.9)	75.0 (23.9)	84.5 (29.2)	88.5 (31.4)	88.4 (31.3)	88.3 (31.3)	83.3 (28.5)	76.5 (24.7)	58.0 (14.4)	43.4 (6.3)	90.6 (32.6)
Mean daily maximum °F (°C)	20.7 (−6.3)	25.8 (−3.4)	37.4 (3.0)	50.0 (10.0)	64.2 (17.9)	72.9 (22.7)	77.2 (25.1)	75.5 (24.2)	67.6 (19.8)	53.6 (12.0)	37.9 (3.3)	26.0 (−3.3)	50.7 (10.4)
Daily mean °F (°C)	11.4 (−11.4)	15.2 (−9.3)	26.2 (−3.2)	38.8 (3.8)	52.0 (11.1)	61.4 (16.3)	66.2 (19.0)	64.5 (18.1)	57.0 (13.9)	43.9 (6.6)	30.2 (−1.0)	18.3 (−7.6)	40.4 (4.7)
Mean daily minimum °F (°C)	2.1 (−16.6)	4.6 (−15.2)	15.1 (−9.4)	27.5 (−2.5)	39.8 (4.3)	49.8 (9.9)	55.3 (12.9)	53.6 (12.0)	46.4 (8.0)	34.1 (1.2)	22.5 (−5.3)	10.5 (−11.9)	30.1 (−1.1)
Mean minimum °F (°C)	−22.1 (−30.1)	−19.1 (−28.4)	−11.5 (−24.2)	11.8 (−11.2)	24.8 (−4.0)	33.8 (1.0)	42.6 (5.9)	41.1 (5.1)	29.7 (−1.3)	20.3 (−6.5)	3.0 (−16.1)	−14.1 (−25.6)	−20.8 (−29.3)
Record low °F (°C)	−49 (−45)	−46 (−43)	−42 (−41)	−9 (−23)	12 (−11)	23 (−5)	31 (−1)	21 (−6)	15 (−9)	6 (−14)	−20 (−29)	−37 (−38)	−49 (−45)
Average precipitation inches (mm)	1.45 (37)	1.15 (29)	1.89 (48)	3.03 (77)	3.82 (97)	4.34 (110)	4.80 (122)	3.32 (84)	3.62 (92)	3.73 (95)	1.95 (50)	1.61 (41)	34.71 (882)
Average snowfall inches (cm)	23.80 (60.5)	16.80 (42.7)	16.10 (40.9)	8.70 (22.1)	0.60 (1.5)	0.00 (0.00)	0.00 (0.00)	0.00 (0.00)	0.20 (0.51)	1.50 (3.8)	12.80 (32.5)	22.10 (56.1)	102.6 (260.61)
Source 1: NOAA
Source 2: XMACIS (records & monthly max/mins)

== Demographics ==
Historical population
Census	Pop.	Note	%±
1910	1,833		—
1920	1,981		8.1%
1930	1,629		−17.8%
1940	1,598		−1.9%
1950	1,306		−18.3%
1960	1,182		−9.5%
1970	1,168		−1.2%
1980	1,046		−10.4%
1990	935		−10.6%
2000	845		−9.6%
2010	731		−13.5%
2020	698		−4.5%
2025 (est.)	697		−0.1%
U.S. Decennial Census

=== 2010 census ===
As of the census of 2010, there were 731 people, 337 households, and 182 families living in the city. The population density was 390.9 inhabitants per square mile (150.9/km^{2}). There were 428 housing units at an average density of 228.9 per square mile (88.4/km^{2}). The racial makeup of the city was 97.1% White, 0.3% African American, 1.2% Native American, 0.1% Asian, 0.3% from other races, and 1.0% from two or more races. Hispanic or Latino of any race were 1.6% of the population.

There were 337 households, of which 24.9% had children under the age of 18 living with them, 38.6% were married couples living together, 11.0% had a female householder with no husband present, 4.5% had a male householder with no wife present, and 46.0% were non-families. 40.4% of all households were made up of individuals, and 15.7% had someone living alone who was 65 years of age or older. The average household size was 2.08 and the average family size was 2.77.

The median age in the city was 46.5 years. 20.7% of residents were under the age of 18; 6.4% were between the ages of 18 and 24; 20.6% were from 25 to 44; 30.1% were from 45 to 64; and 22.2% were 65 years of age or older. The gender makeup of the city was 49.4% male and 50.6% female.

=== 2000 census ===
As of the census of 2000, there were 845 people, 378 households, and 215 families living in the city. The population density was 456.5 people per square mile (176.4/km^{2}). There were 436 housing units at an average density of 235.5 per square mile (91.0/km^{2}). The racial makeup of the city was 96.57% White, 0.24% African American, 1.66% Native American, 0.12% Asian, 0.12% Pacific Islander, 0.36% from other races, and 0.95% from two or more races. Hispanic or Latino of any race were 0.95% of the population.

There were 378 households, out of which 23.8% had children under the age of 18 living with them, 46.3% were married couples living together, 7.7% had a female householder with no husband present, and 43.1% were non-families. 39.7% of all households were made up of individuals, and 22.0% had someone living alone who was 65 years of age or older. The average household size was 2.15 and the average family size was 2.89.

In the city, the population was spread out, with 20.6% under the age of 18, 7.1% from 18 to 24, 26.2% from 25 to 44, 21.8% from 45 to 64, and 24.4% who were 65 years of age or older. The median age was 43 years. For every 100 females, there were 98.4 males. For every 100 females age 18 and over, there were 91.7 males.

The median income for a household in the city was $31,917, and the median income for a family was $41,111. Males had a median income of $30,804 versus $21,042 for females. The per capita income for the city was $16,297. About 1.4% of families and 5.9% of the population were below the poverty line, including 5.6% of those under age 18 and 10.2% of those age 65 or over.

== Transportation ==
Bus service is provided by Bay Area Rural Transit.

== Notable people ==
- Robert F. Barabe, Wisconsin state representative and mayor of Mellen
- D. E. Bowe, Wisconsin state representative
- Bernard E. Gehrmann, Wisconsin state representative
- Bernard J. Gehrmann, U.S. representative from Wisconsin

== Images ==
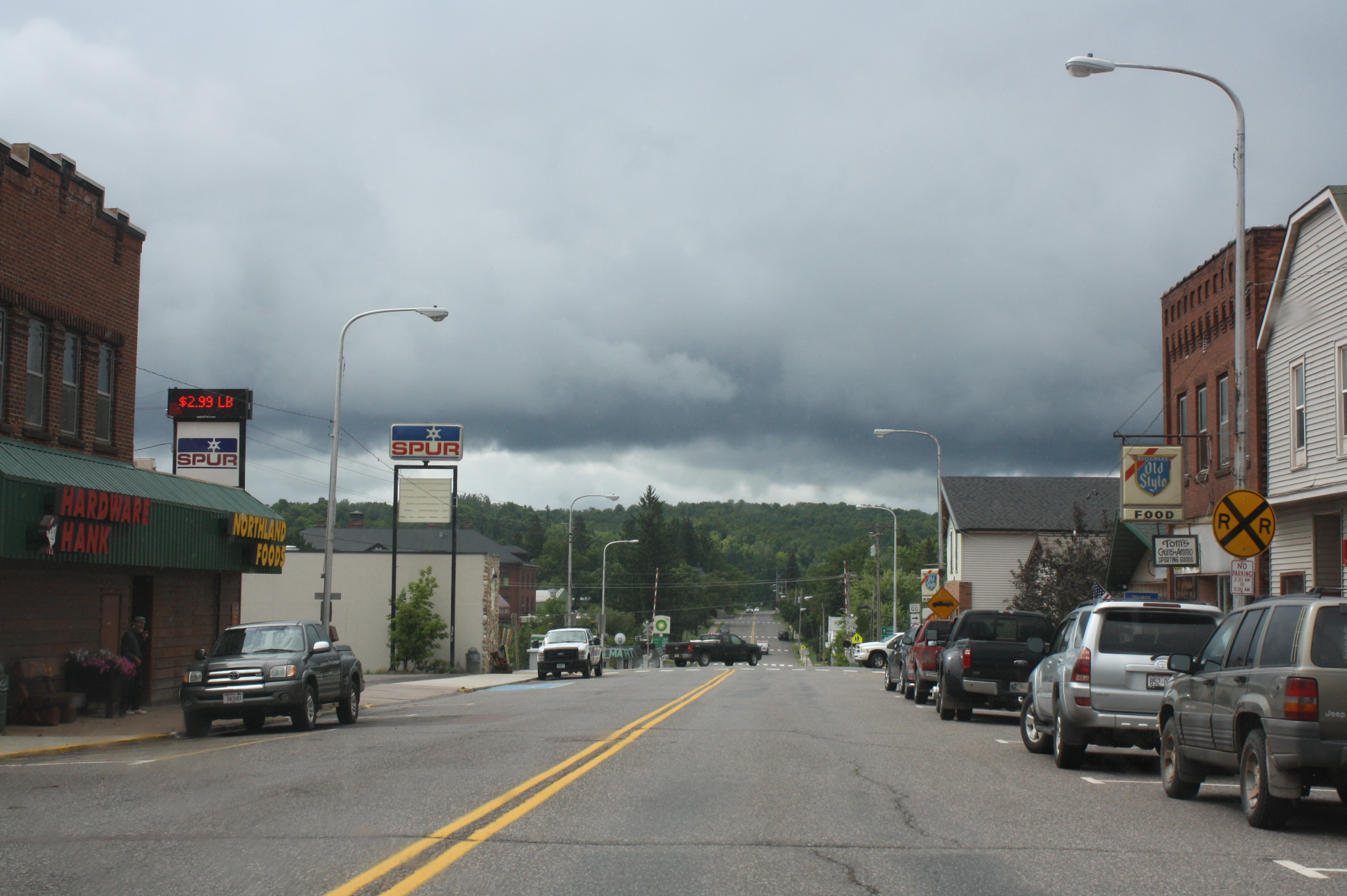
Looking south at downtown Mellen

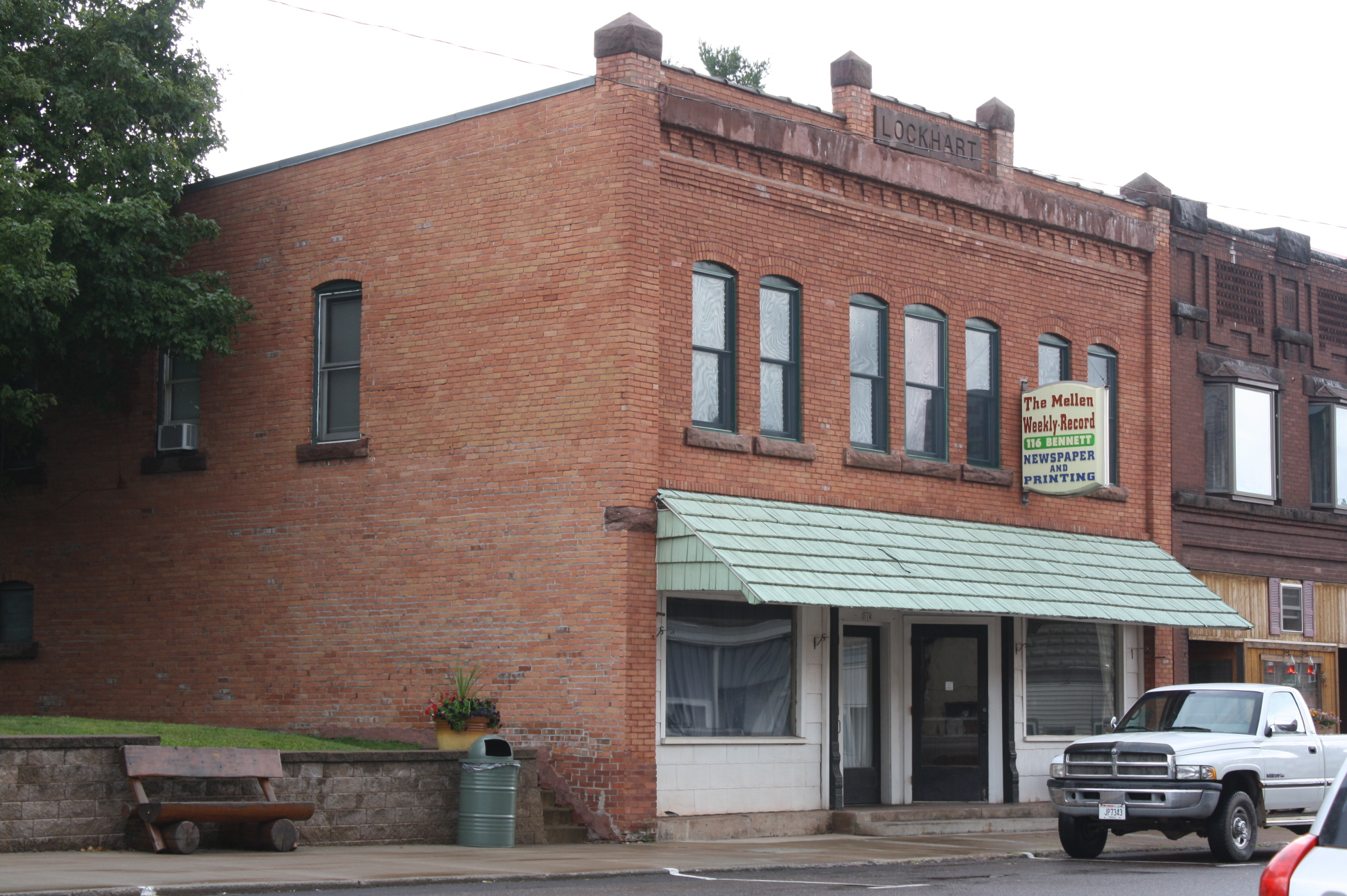
Mellen Weekly Record newspaper building

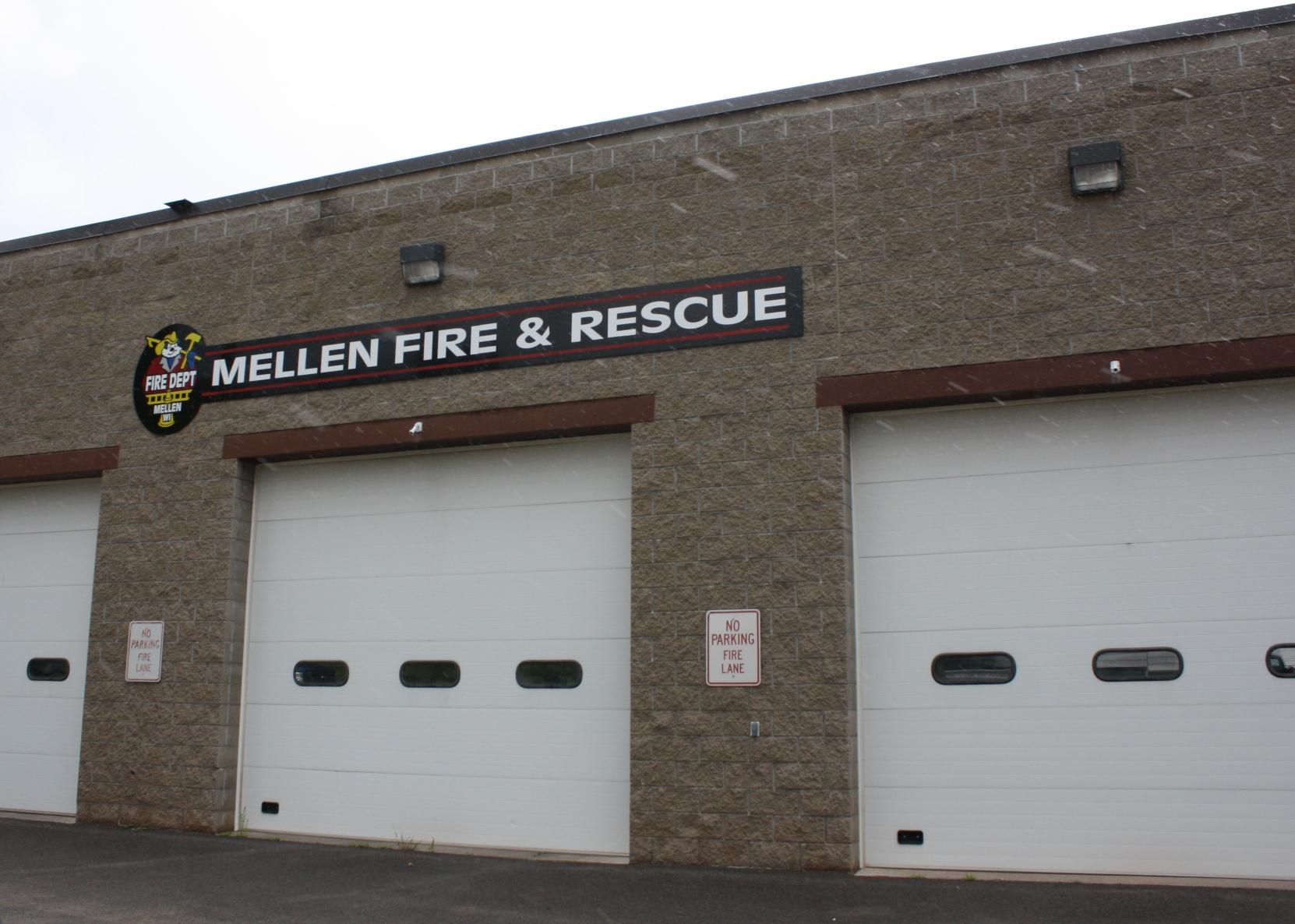
Mellen Fire and Rescue

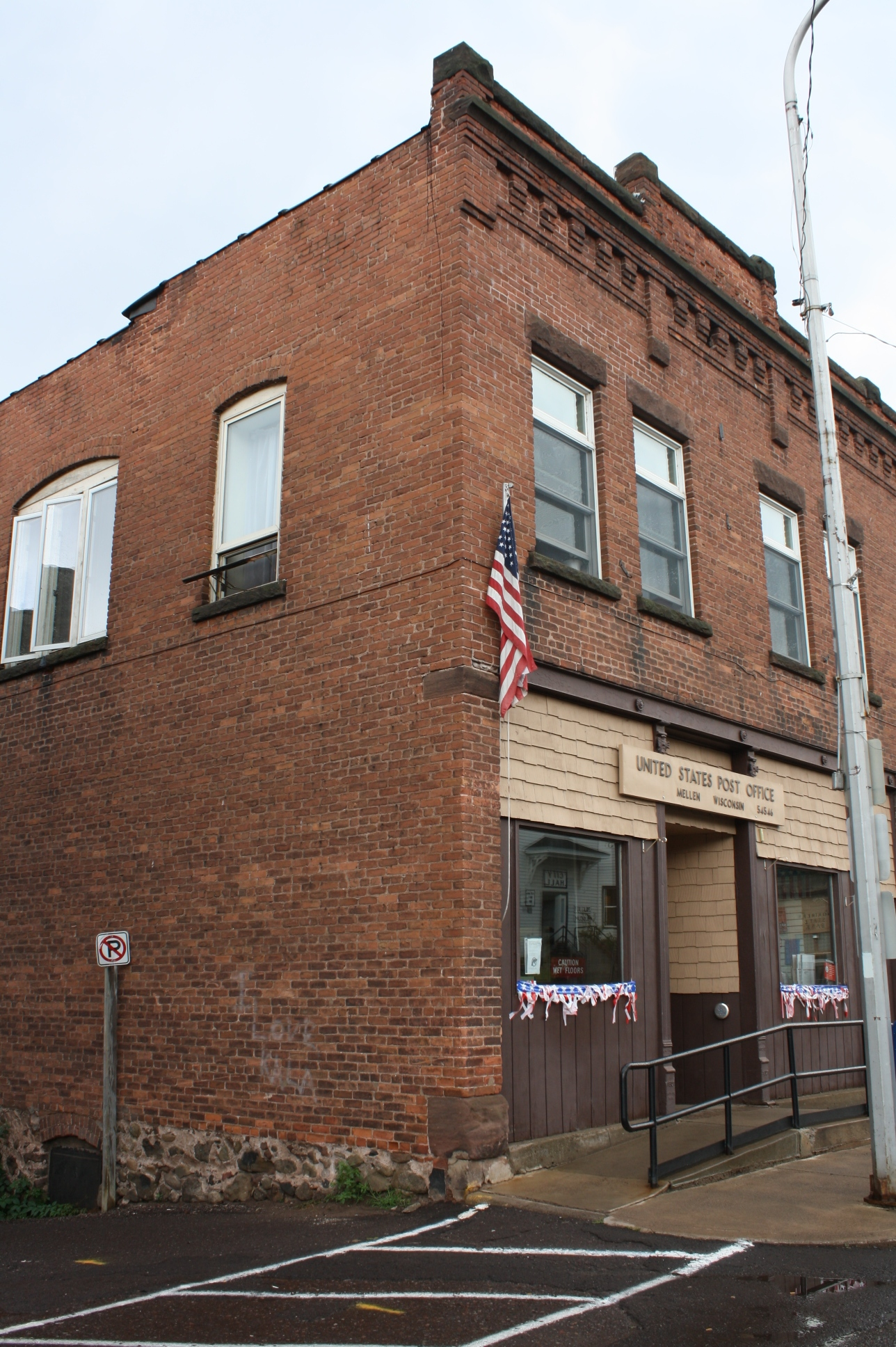
Post office

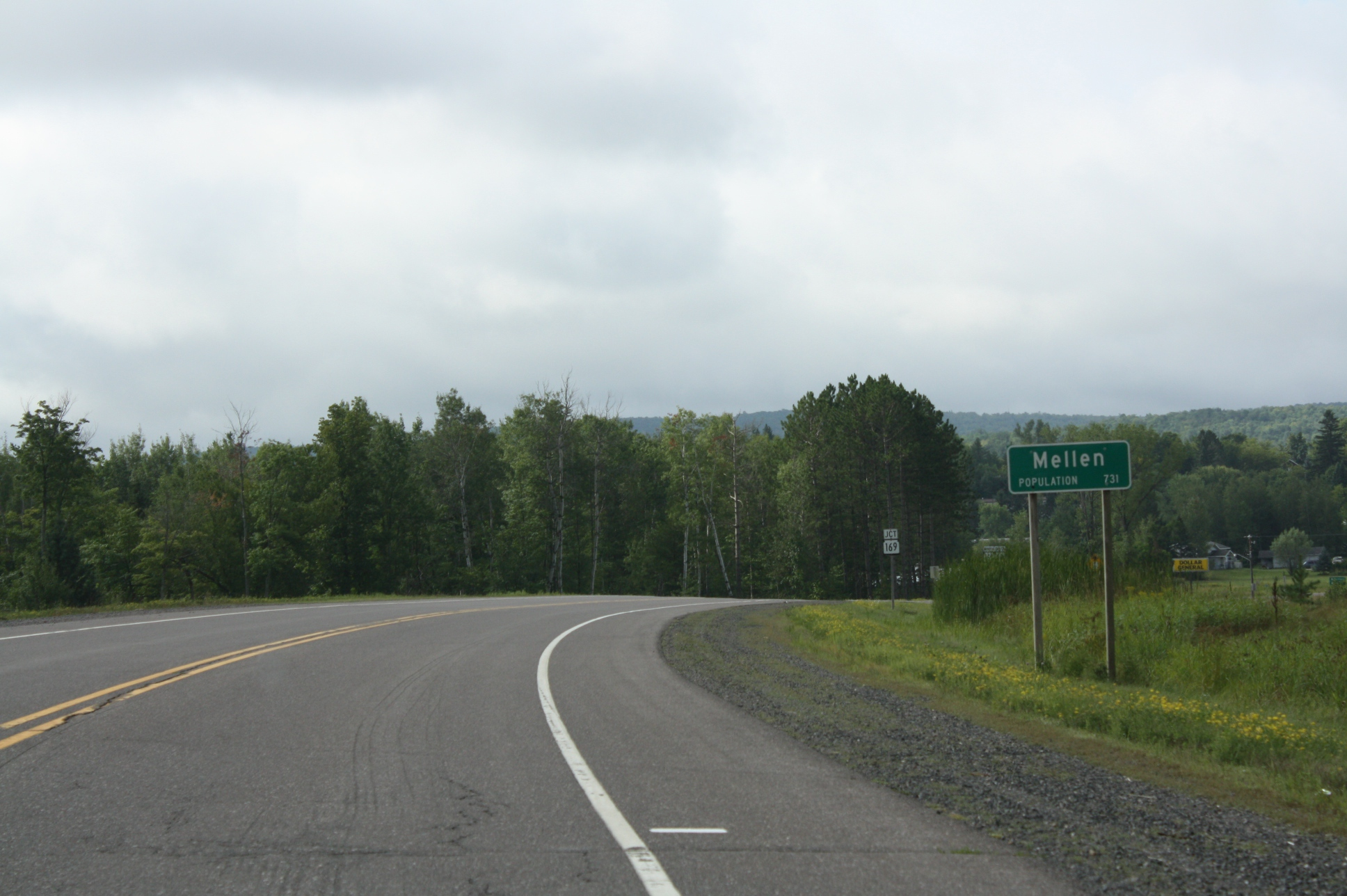
Sign on WIS13

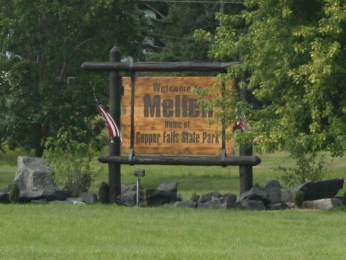
Welcome sign

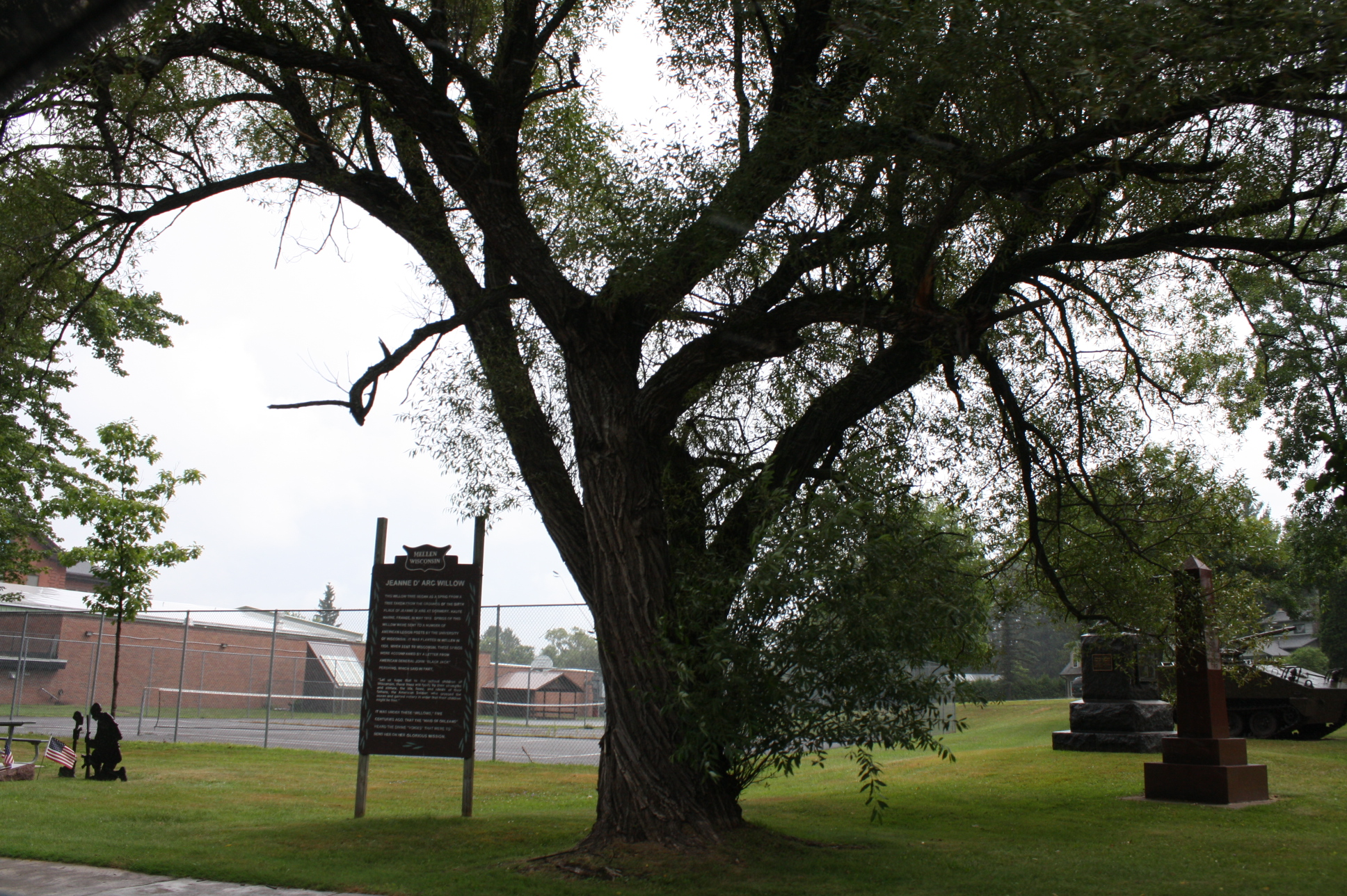
Joan of Arc Willow

Northern State Bank building, 2003

== See also ==
- List of cities in Wisconsin
