= Gurney, Wisconsin =

- Town
- Location in Iron County and the state of Wisconsin.
- Coordinates: 46°28′32″N 90°29′46″W
- Country: United States
- State: Wisconsin
- County: Iron

Area
  - Total: 37.0 sq mi (95.8 km^{2})
  - Land: 37.0 sq mi (95.8 km^{2})
  - Water: 0 sq mi (0.0 km^{2})
- Elevation: 997 ft (304 m)

Population (2020)
  - Total: 145
  - Density: 3.92/sq mi (1.51/km^{2})
- Time zone: UTC-6 (Central (CST))
  - Summer (DST): UTC-5 (CDT)
- Area codes: 715 & 534
- FIPS code: 55-31875
- GNIS feature ID: 1583332

Gurney is a town in Iron County, Wisconsin, United States. The population was 145 at the 2020 census. The unincorporated community of Cedar is located in the town.

== Geography ==
According to the United States Census Bureau, the town has a total area of 37.0 square miles (95.8 km^{2}), all land.

Gurney is located by U.S. Route 2, west of State Highway 122.

== Demographics ==
As of the census of 2000, there were 158 people, 60 households, and 51 families residing in the town. The population density was 4.3 people per square mile (1.6/km^{2}). There were 84 housing units at an average density of 2.3 per square mile (0.9/km^{2}). The racial makeup of the town was 99.37% White, and 0.63% from two or more races.

There were 60 households, out of which 31.7% had children under the age of 18 living with them, 83.3% were married couples living together, 1.7% had a female householder with no husband present, and 15.0% were non-families. 13.3% of all households were made up of individuals, and 5.0% had someone living alone who was 65 years of age or older. The average household size was 2.63 and the average family size was 2.90.

In the town, the population was spread out, with 25.3% under the age of 18, 4.4% from 18 to 24, 28.5% from 25 to 44, 31.6% from 45 to 64, and 10.1% who were 65 years of age or older. The median age was 39 years. For every 100 females, there were 113.5 males. For every 100 females age 18 and over, there were 100.0 males.

The median income for a household in the town was $35,417, and the median income for a family was $36,458. Males had a median income of $31,250 versus $28,750 for females. The per capita income for the town was $15,022. About 12.3% of families and 9.9% of the population were below the poverty line, including none of those under the age of 18 and 4.8% of those 65 or over.
