= Cedar, Wisconsin =

- Unincorporated community
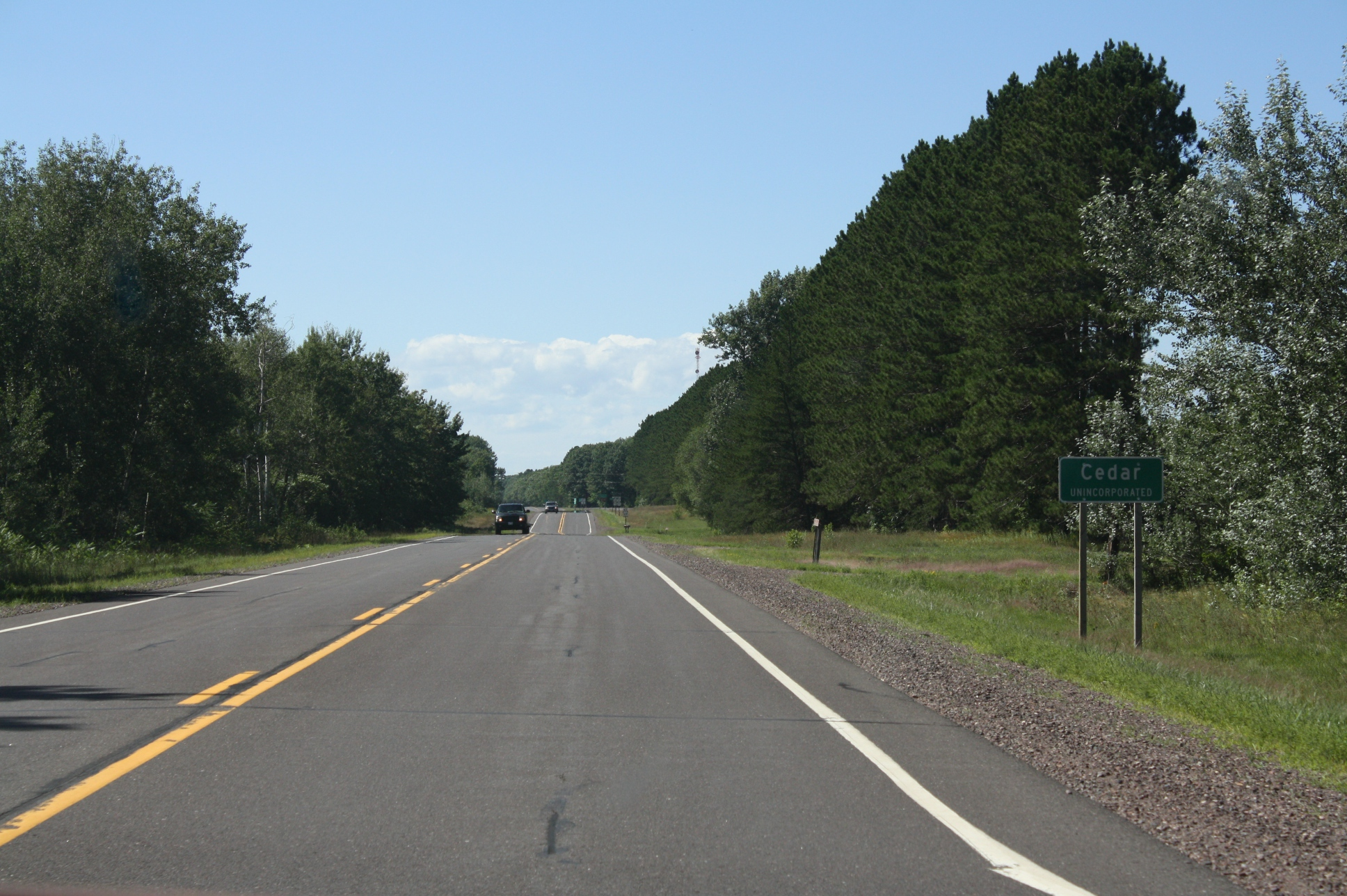
- Sign

- Location within Wisconsin Location within the United States
- Coordinates: 46°30′26″N 90°29′54″W
- Country: United States
- State: Wisconsin
- County: Iron
- Town: Gurney
- Elevation: 1,083 ft (330 m)
- Time zone: UTC-6 (Central (CST))
  - Summer (DST): UTC-5 (CDT)
- Area codes: 715 & 534
- GNIS feature ID: 1578967

Cedar is an unincorporated community located in the town of Gurney, Iron County, Wisconsin, United States. Cedar is located on U.S. Route 2, 4 miles (6.4 km) west-northwest of Saxon.

== History ==
A post office called Cedar was established in 1891, and remained in operation until it was discontinued in 1955. The community was named from groves of cedar near the town site.
