= Joseph Klein =

Joseph Klein may refer to:

- Joseph Klein (politician) (1886–?), Wisconsin machinist and Socialist legislator
- Joseph Klein (1912–1976), mayor of Kutzenhausen in 1945
- Joseph Klein (composer) (born 1962), American composer, conductor, and educator
- Joseph Klein (figure skater) (born 2004), American figure skater

== See also ==
- Joe Klein (born 1946), American journalist and columnist
- Joe Klein (baseball executive) (1942–2017), American executive in professional baseball
- Joe Kleine (born 1962), American basketball player
