= Joe Klein (disambiguation) =

Joe Klein (born 1946) is an American journalist and columnist, known for his novel Primary Colors.

Joe Klein may also refer to:

- Joe Klein (baseball executive) (1942–2017), American executive in professional baseball

== See also ==
- Joe Kleine (born 1962), American basketball player
- Joseph Klein (composer) (born 1962), American composer, conductor, and educator
- Joseph Klein (politician) (1886–?), Wisconsin machinist and Socialist legislator
