= Thomas Duncan (American politician) =

American politician (1893–1959)

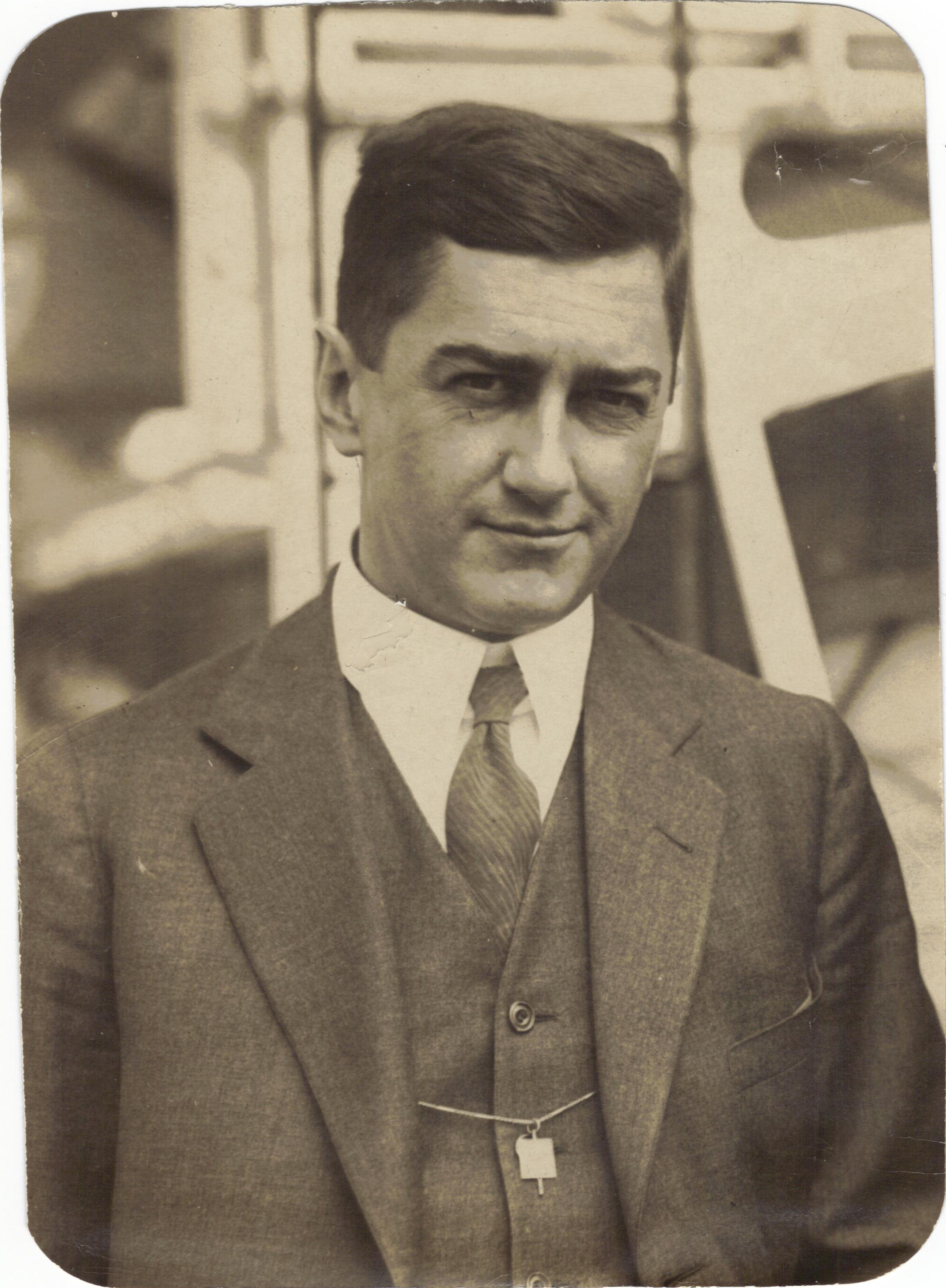
- Duncan in 1932

Member of the Wisconsin Senate from the 6th district
- In office January 7, 1929 – January 2, 1933
- Preceded by: Alex C. Ruffing
- Succeeded by: Charles H. Phillips

Member of the Wisconsin State Assembly from the Milwaukee 4th district
- In office January 1, 1923 – January 7, 1929
- Preceded by: Fred Hasley
- Succeeded by: Fred W. Springer

Personal details
- Born: March 5, 1893 Westboro, Wisconsin, U.S.
- Died: February 22, 1959 (aged 65) Washington, D.C., U.S.
- Resting place: Forest Home Cemetery
- Party: Socialist (before 1935); Progressive (1935–1946); Democratic (after 1946)
- Spouse: Catherine Cody (m. 1915)
- Children: 2
- Education: Yale University
- Profession: Clerk
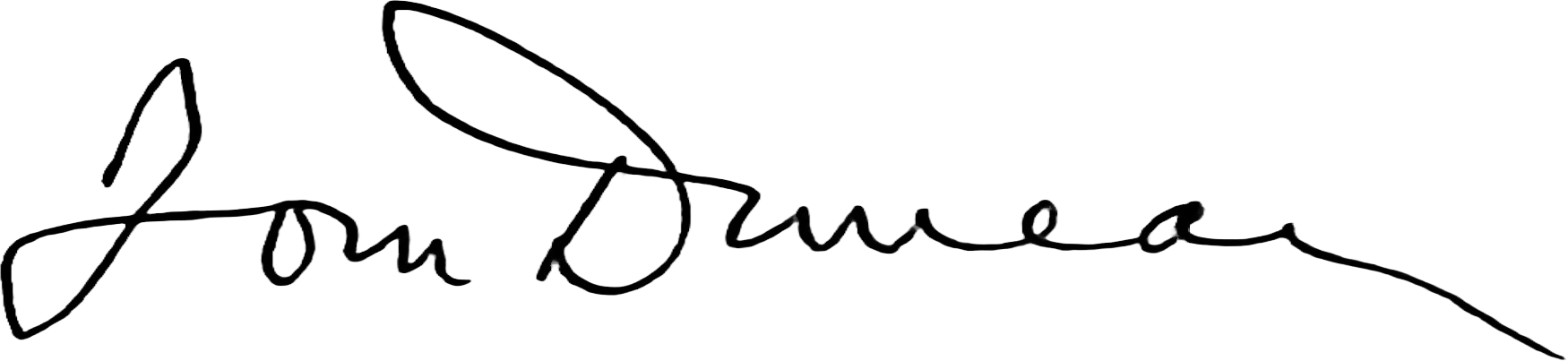
- Signature

Thomas McEwing Duncan (March 5, 1893 – February 22, 1959) was an American clerical worker from Milwaukee who served three terms as a Socialist member of the Wisconsin State Assembly (1923–1929) and one term as a member of the Wisconsin State Senate (1929–1933) representing the Milwaukee-based 6th Senate district.

== Background ==
Duncan was born in Westboro, Wisconsin on March 5, 1893 and was educated in the Milwaukee Public Schools. He graduated from Yale University in 1915. After graduation he was employed in the bond department of the First Wisconsin Trust Company, and later in the consolidated bond department of the First Wisconsin National Bank. He served as Secretary to Milwaukee Mayor Daniel Hoan from April 1920 to January 1, 1925, and as a member of the Milwaukee Firemen's and Policemen's Pension Commission.

== Legislative service ==
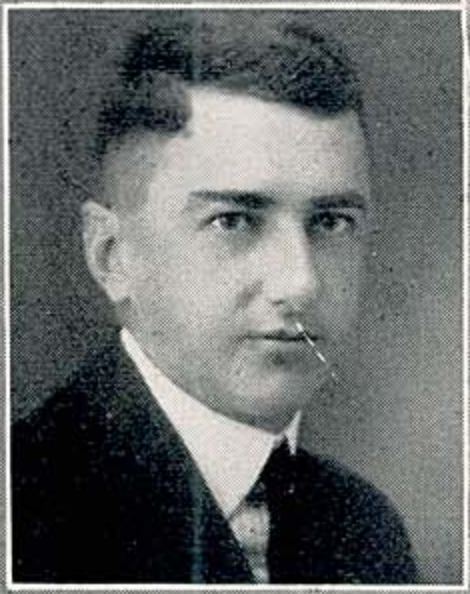
Duncan's official State Assembly portrait, 1923

He was first elected to the Assembly in November 1922 without opposition to succeed fellow Socialist Fred Hasley to represent the Fourth Milwaukee County Assembly district (the 21st ward of the City of Milwaukee).

Duncan became the most successful Socialist legislator in state history, authoring 83 successful bills over his decade-long career. He was responsible for the 1930 introduction and passage of the partial veto into the Wisconsin state constitution, considered "the most extensive" veto power that has been "given to any state executive."

After the death of Congressman Victor Berger in 1929, Duncan was considered his successor as leader of the Wisconsin socialists, and took over editing and publishing the Milwaukee Leader. He was seen as less doctrinaire than Berger, and at one time was discussed as a potential candidate for Governor of Wisconsin under some form of Progressive/Socialist fusion ticket. In a controversial move, Republican Governor Philip La Follette appointed Duncan his executive secretary in 1931, and he quickly became a member of La Follette's inner circle. The following year, Duncan was asserted to have (unsuccessfully) led efforts to lure the Socialists into the La Follette camp.

He did not seek re-election to the Senate in 1932, seeing his career in the legislature as a dead end; Socialist Assemblyman George Hampel was nominated to succeed Duncan in the 6th District, but was defeated by Democrat Charles H. Phillips in the 1932 Democratic landslide.

== Executive service ==
While La Follette lost renomination in 1932, he made a comeback two years later on the Progressive ticket, and after retaking office he once again appointed Duncan his secretary. In that position, he aided the Governor in passing several pieces of Progressive legislation, including the "Little TVA" Act, which passed the State Senate by just one vote. His strategy of negotiating with legislators during sessions led to the State Assembly passing a resolution banning the practice.

In 1935, Duncan was instrumental in the formation of the Wisconsin Farmer-Labor Progressive Federation, a coalition made up of the Progressive Party, the Socialist Party, the Farmer-Labor Progressive League, the Wisconsin State Federation of Labor, and several other labor and farmers' groups. In particular, Duncan was able to convince the socialists to give up their ballot access in exchange for reserving certain seats for socialists running under the Progressive ticket.

== Manslaughter charge and conviction ==
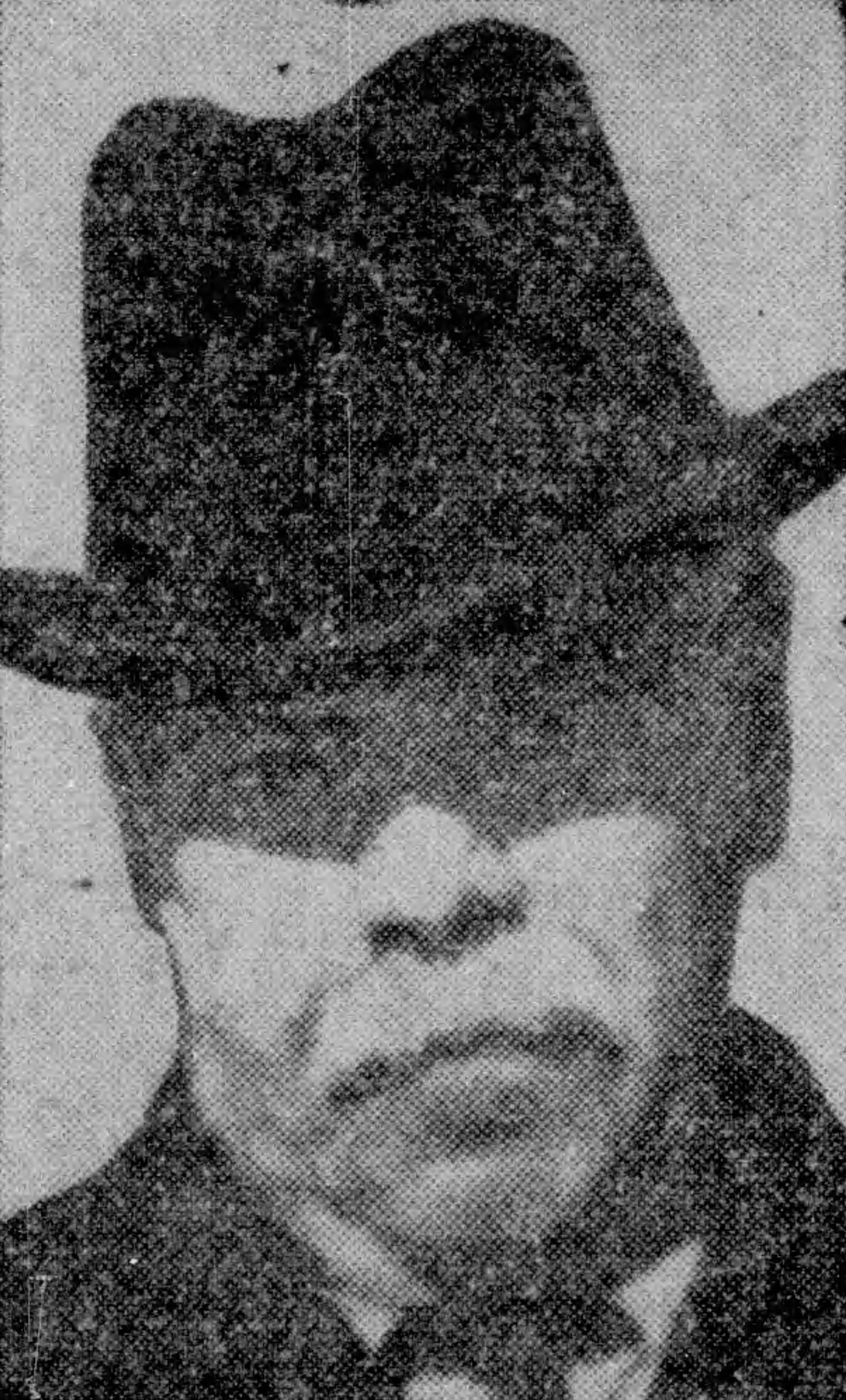
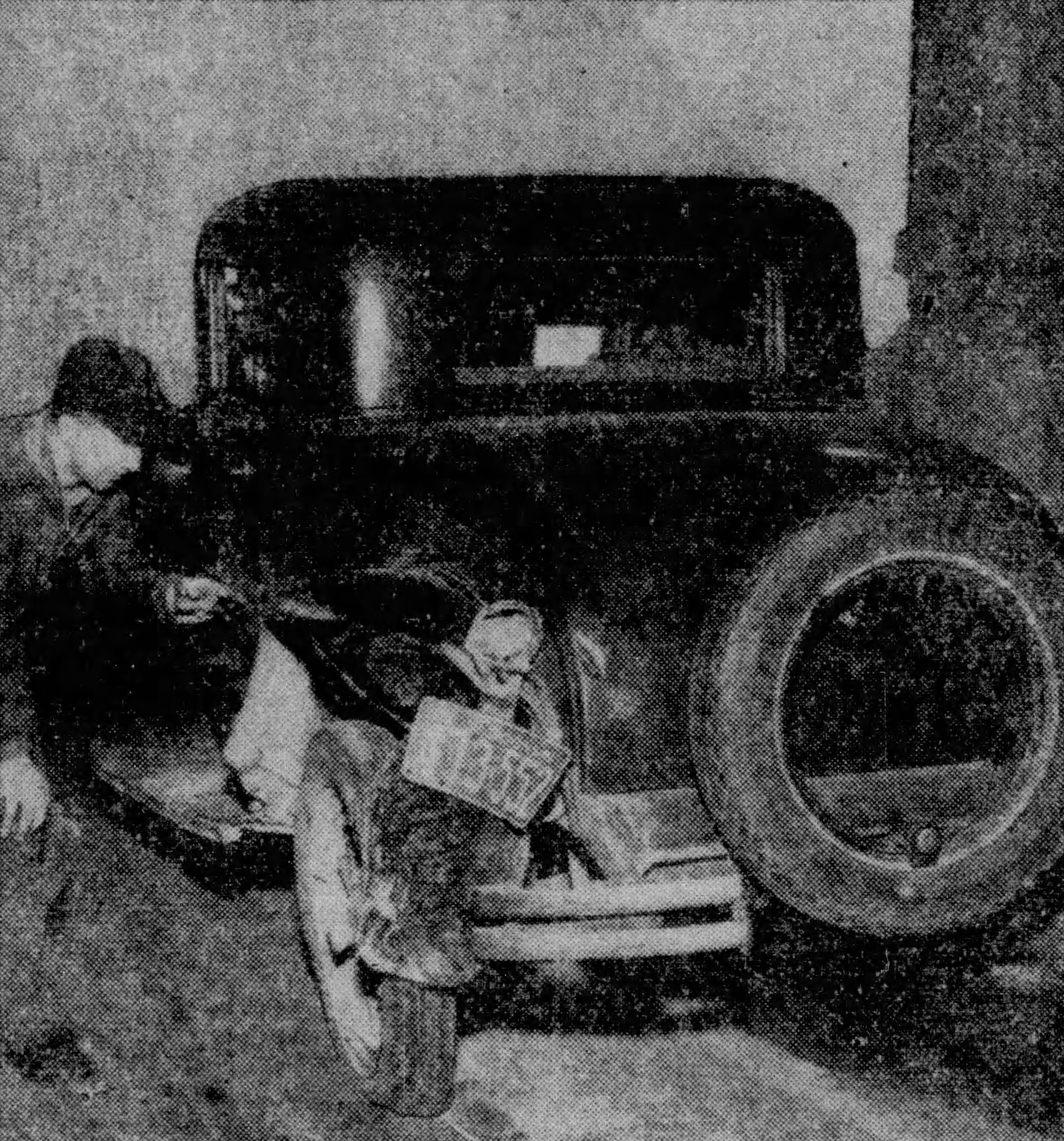
Henry F. Schuette and the damage done to his car

On March 10, 1938, Duncan was issued a warrant charging first-degree manslaughter in connection to the death of 69-year-old Henry F. Schuette in an automobile accident. Police claimed they gave chase to Duncan the previous night after they saw him drive through an intersection three miles from the crash site in a Ford with a damaged front end. After forcing him to the side of the road, the officers found that he had been drinking and arrested him. Police physicians later corroborated that Duncan was suffering from "acute alcoholism." Duncan pled innocent, claiming he had no memory of the crash, and posted bail. Soon after, the Farmer-Labor Progressive Federation passed a resolution giving him a "unanimous vote of confidence."

Milwaukee County District Attorney Herbert Steffes, who prosecuted Duncan in the ensuing trial, was a fellow Progressive, as was presiding judge Gullick N. Risjord. Duncan's defense made the case that he suffered from angiospasms that left him mentally impaired on the night of the accident, but Risjord rejected this argument and on June 4 ultimately found him guilty. Risjord did, however, reduce the charge to manslaughter in the fourth degree, which only carried a sentence of 1–2 years as opposed to the 5-10 that would have accompanied a first-degree conviction.

Even with this lenient sentence, Duncan's wife lobbied District Attorney Steffes and Governor La Follette to pardon him. That November, La Follette had lost re-election, and would be leaving office soon. In one of his last acts as Governor of Wisconsin, La Follette granted Duncan a pardon on Christmas Eve, issuing a statement that an "injustice" had been done with his conviction.

== Later career and death ==
With the Progressives out of office and his name still mired in controversy, Duncan accepted a job at the Federal Deposit Insurance Corporation assisting in bank liquidations. He was reportedly hired by Leo Crowley, a fellow Wisconsinite, shortly after his pardon. He worked for the FDIC from 1939 until the end of 1947, when he went to work for the American Federation of Labor as publicity director for Labor's League for Political Education. After the AFL-CIO merger in 1955, he held a similar post in its Committee on Political Education until his retirement in 1958.

On February 22, 1959, Duncan passed away in Washington, D.C., having suffered from cancer. He was survived by his wife, his two sons, and four grandchildren.
