= Charles H. Phillips =

American politician (1859–1938)

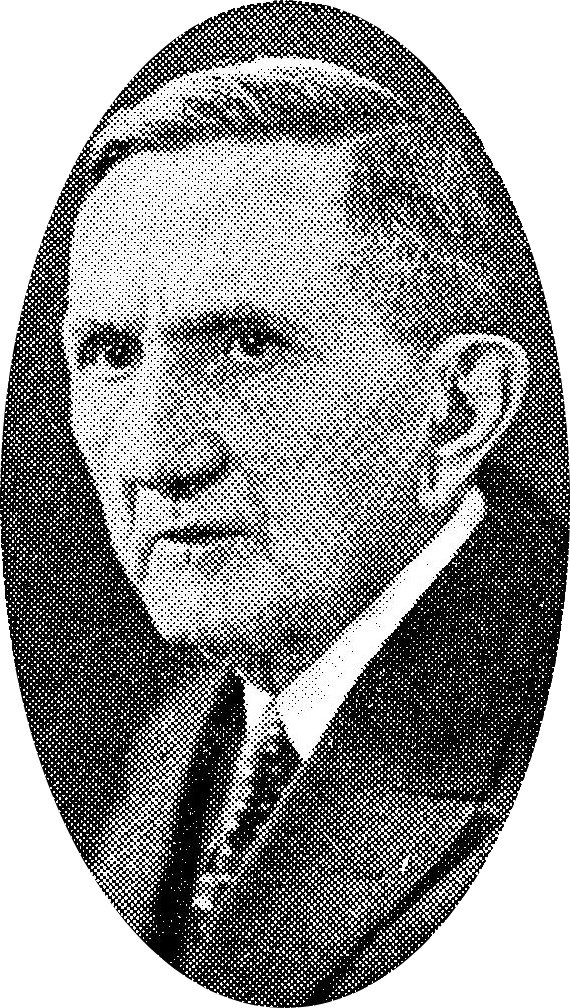
- Phillips c. 1933

Member of the Wisconsin Senate from the 6th district
- In office January 2, 1933 – January 4, 1937
- Preceded by: Thomas H. Duncan
- Succeeded by: George Hampel

Personal details
- Born: January 21, 1859 Milwaukee, Wisconsin, U.S.
- Died: June 24, 1938 (aged 79) Milwaukee, Wisconsin, U.S.
- Cause of death: Heart attack
- Resting place: Calvary Cemetery, Milwaukee
- Party: Democratic
- Spouse: Helen Ramstack (m. 1884–1938)
- Children: Joseph Phillips^{(b. 1885; died 1947)}; Helen Adele (Wein)^{(b. 1895; died 1988)}
- Parents: Joseph Phillips (father); Mary Anne Phillips (née End) (mother)
- Education: University of Wisconsin–Madison; University of Wisconsin Law School
- Profession: Lawyer

Charles Hermann Phillips (January 21, 1859 – May 24, 1938) was an American lawyer and Democratic politician in Milwaukee, Wisconsin. He was a member of the Wisconsin State Senate from 1933 to 1937, representing Wisconsin's 6th State Senate district. He was a son of Joseph Phillips, the 19th mayor of Milwaukee.

== Background ==
Phillips was born on January 21, 1859, in Milwaukee. Charles Phillips attended parochial and public schools and Markham Academy, and went on to the University of Wisconsin–Madison. From 1891 to 1895 he worked in the office of the Wisconsin Secretary of State. During this time, he attended the University of Wisconsin Law School, graduating in 1893. For a time, he worked with his father, and with a Milwaukee leather company, before going into the practice of law. He served as chairman of the Milwaukee County Democratic Party County Committee, and was a delegate to the 1932 Democratic National Convention.

== Elective office ==
In 1932 Phillips challenged Socialist State Representative George Hampel who nominated to succeed the incumbent, fellow Socialist Thomas Duncan (who was not seeking re-election). After winning his party primary, Phillips, running on the Democratic ticket with Franklin D. Roosevelt narrowly defeated Hampel in a four-way race, with 14,485 votes for Phillips, 13,951 for Hampel, 8,433 for Republican George Becker, and 267 votes for former Republican State Representative Martin M. Higgins, who was running as an independent. He was assigned to the standing committee on state and local government, and became chairman of the committee in charge of Wisconsin's exhibit at the 1933-34 Chicago Centennial of Progress (world's fair). After the 1934 elections, he became chairman of the standing committee on the judiciary, and a member of the committee on legislative procedure.

In 1936, Phillips sought re-election, but was defeated in turn by George Hampel, who was running as a nominal Progressive under the Socialist/Progressive cooperation agreement then under effect, with 22,093 votes for Hampel, 14,136 for Phillips, and 4982 for Republican Salendon Bennett.

== Personal life and family ==
Charles Phillips was the 3rd of nine children born to Joseph Phillips and his first wife, Mary Anne (née End). Joseph Phillips was a prominent German Catholic immigrant businessman and flourished in the insurance industry. He was elected to one term as mayor of Milwaukee and represented Milwaukee in the Wisconsin State Assembly for three years.

Charles Phillips married Helen Ramstack in 1884. They had at least two children.

Charles H. Phillips died at age 79 on May 24, 1938. He suffered an apparent heart attack while on his way home from work. He was interred at Milwaukee's historic Calvary Cemetery.

== Electoral history ==
=== Wisconsin Senate (1932, 1936) ===
Wisconsin Senate, 6th District Election, 1932
Party	Candidate	Votes	%	±%
Democratic Primary, September 1932
Democratic	Charles H. Phillips	2,356	66.42%	
Democratic	Rostock	1,191	33.58%	
Plurality		1,165	32.84%	
Total votes		3,547	100.0%	
General Election, November 8, 1932
Democratic	Charles H. Phillips	14,885	39.66%	
Socialist	George Hampel	13,951	37.17%	
Republican	George W. Becker	8,433	22.47%	
Independent	Martin Higgins	267	0.71%	
Plurality		934	2.49%	
Total votes		37,536	100.0%	
Democratic gain from Socialist				

Wisconsin Senate, 6th District Election, 1936
Party	Candidate	Votes	%	±%
Democratic Primary, September 1936
Democratic	Charles H. Phillips (incumbent)	2,980	51.87%	
Democratic	Reilly	2,765	48.13%	
Plurality		215	3.74%	
Total votes		5,745	100.0%	
General Election, November 3, 1936
Progressive	George Hampel	22,093	53.61%	
Democratic	Charles H. Phillips (incumbent)	14,136	34.30%	−5.35%
Republican	Salendon Bennett	4,982	12.09%	−10.38%
Plurality		7,957	19.31%	
Total votes		41,211	100.0%	+9.79%
Progressive gain from Democratic				

Wisconsin Senate
Preceded by Thomas H. Duncan	Member of the Wisconsin Senate from the 6th district January 2, 1933 – January 4, 1937	Succeeded by George Hampel
