= 1873 United States Senate election in Wisconsin =

- January 22, 1873
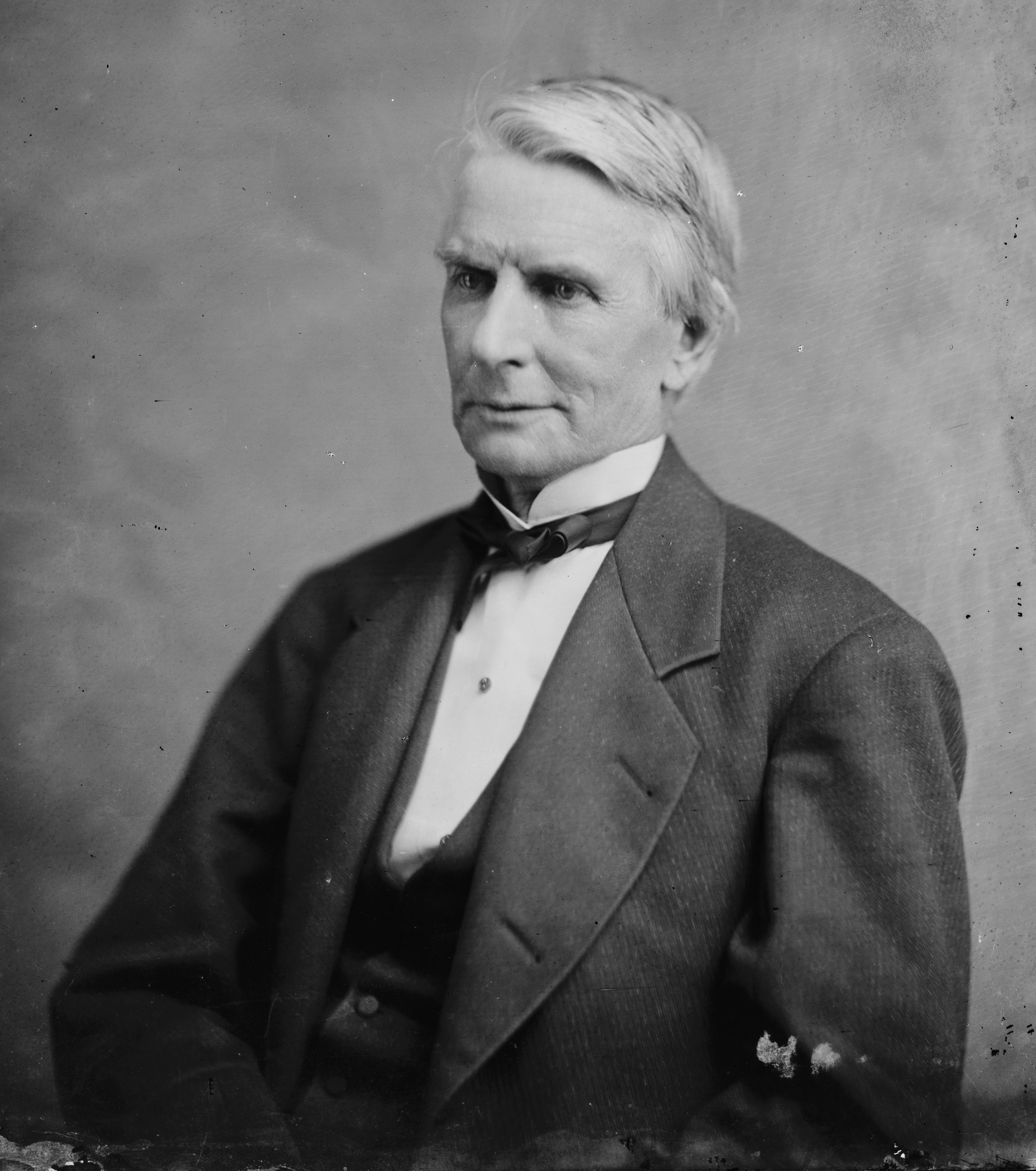

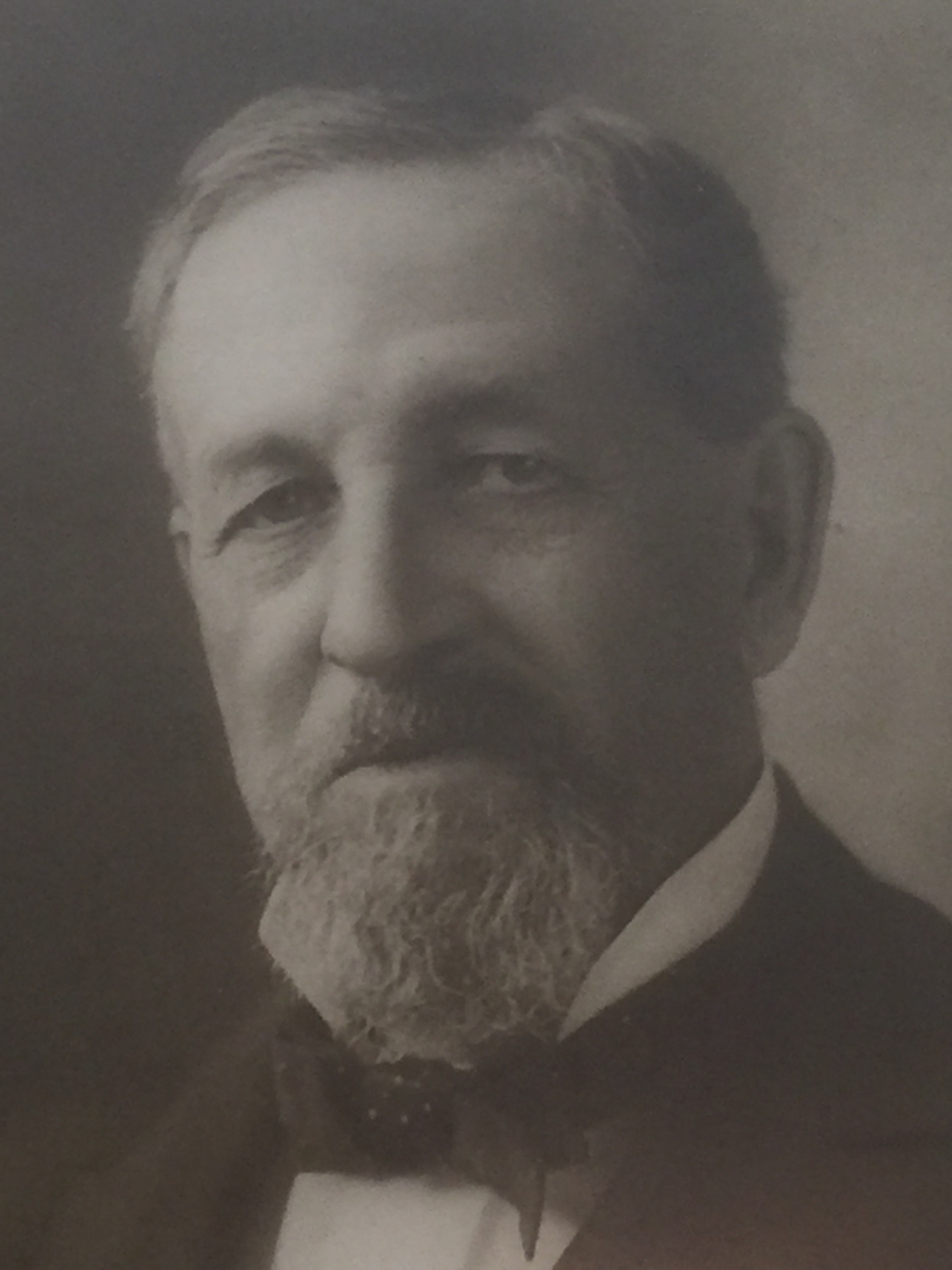
Nominee	Timothy O. Howe	Henry L. Palmer	others
Party	Republican	Democratic
Legislative vote	83	44	1
Percentage	64.84%	34.38%	0.78%
U.S. senator before election
Timothy O. Howe
Republican
Elected U.S. Senator
Timothy O. Howe
Republican

The 1873 United States Senate election in Wisconsin was held in the 26th Wisconsin Legislature on January 22, 1873. Incumbent Republican U.S. senator Timothy O. Howe was re-elected on the first ballot, becoming the first three-term U.S. senator from Wisconsin.

At the start of the 1873 term, Republicans held majorities in both chambers of the Wisconsin Legislature, and were easily able to re-elect their incumbent U.S. senator. His re-election was considered a foregone conclusion in newspapers, and there does not appear to have been any other candidates for the Republican nomination.

== Major candidates ==
=== Democratic ===
- Henry L. Palmer, incumbent state representative, former speaker and former state senator from Milwaukee.

=== Republican ===
- Timothy O. Howe, incumbent U.S. senator, former Wisconsin circuit court judge from Green Bay.

== Results ==
The 26th Wisconsin Legislature met in joint session on January 22, 1873, to elect a U.S. senator. The voting was almost entirely along party lines, with five Democrats absent. Of the 128 in attendance, Timothy O. Howe received the votes of all but one of the Republican legislators, winning the election.

1st Vote of the 26th Wisconsin Legislature, January 22, 1873
Party	Candidate	Votes	%
Republican	Timothy O. Howe (incumbent)	83 (Note: Howe received the votes of all Republican members except for representative Casper Sanger (who voted for Palmer); he also received cross-over votes from Liberal Republican senator Romanzo E. Davis and Democratic representative Isaac W. Van Schaick.)	64.84%
Democratic	Henry L. Palmer	44 (Note: Palmer received the votes of all Democrats and Liberal Republicans except senator Romanzo E. Davis and representative Isaac W. Van Schaick (who voted for Howe), and senators Orlando Brown and Joseph Wagner and representatives John W. Davis, Truman M. Fay, and Thomas Tobin (who were absent), and Palmer himself (who cast his vote for Eldredge); he received one cross-over vote from Republican representative Casper Sanger.)	34.38%
Democratic	Charles A. Eldredge	1 (Note: Democratic representative Henry L. Palmer voted for Charles A. Eldredge.)	0.78%
	Absent	5	
Majority		65	50.78%
Total votes		128	96.24%
Republican hold			
