= John J. Tallmadge =

19th century American politician

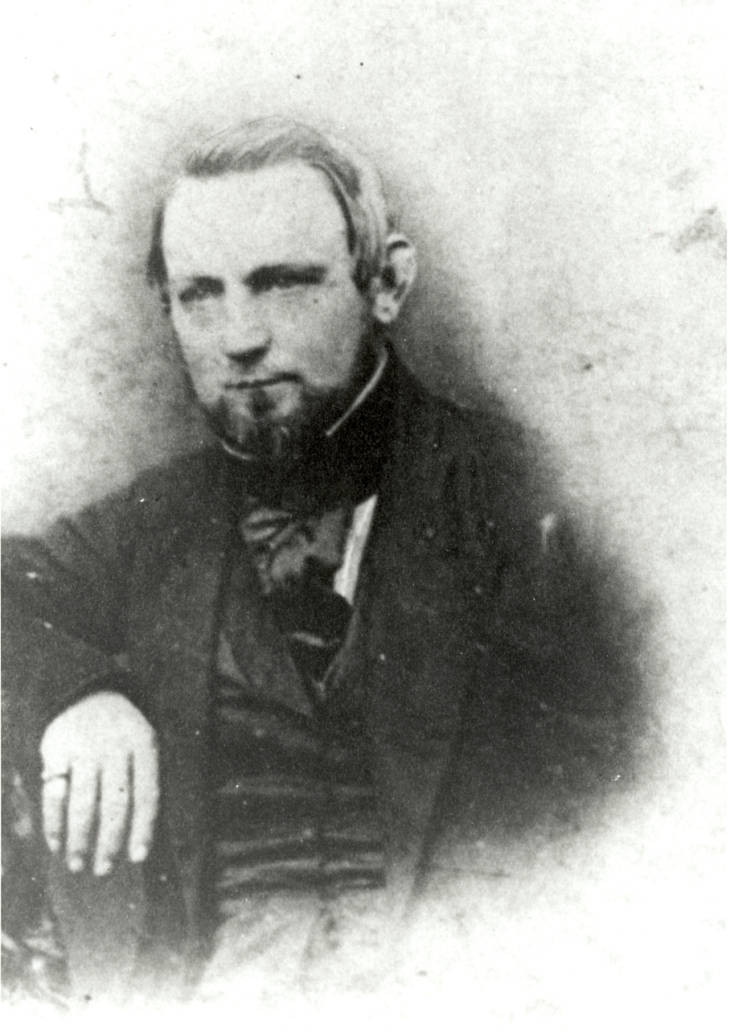

17th Mayor of Milwaukee
- In office April 16, 1865 – April 23, 1867
- Preceded by: Abner Kirby
- Succeeded by: Edward O'Neill

Personal details
- Born: John James Tallmadge; January 10, 1818 Claverack, New York, US
- Died: October 16, 1873 (aged 55) Summit, Waukesha County, Wisconsin, US
- Resting place: Forest Home Cemetery; Milwaukee, Wisconsin
- Party: Democratic
- Spouse: Harriet Jacobs (m. 1840–1878)
- Children: 6
- Parents: James Tallmadge (father); Anna (West) Tallmadge (mother)
- Relatives: James Tallmadge Jr.^{(1st cousin, once removed)}; Matthias B. Tallmadge^{(1st cousin, once removed)}; Nathaniel P. Tallmadge^{(1st cousin, once removed)}; Benjamin Tallmadge^{(1st cousin, twice removed)}; Charles Ruggles Boardman^{(2nd cousin, once removed)}
- Profession: Businessman, politician

John James Tallmadge (January 10, 1818 – October 16, 1873) was an American businessman, Democratic politician, and Wisconsin pioneer. He was the 17th mayor of Milwaukee, Wisconsin, and was the first president of the Milwaukee Chamber of Commerce. He was the Democratic nominee for governor of Wisconsin in 1867.

He was a member of the Tallmadge (or Talmadge) family of New England, which had many notable members in American political and cultural history. Nathaniel P. Tallmadge, the 3rd governor of the Wisconsin Territory, was his first cousin, once removed.

== Biography ==
Tallmadge was born on January 10, 1818, in Claverack, New York. At age 16, he was hired as a clerk at a dry goods store in Lyons, New York, where he was educated in business. He became involved in the transportation business in Albany, New York, and later moved his company to Buffalo.

From Buffalo, he moved to Milwaukee in 1855 as an agent for the Western Transportation Company. He became a prominent businessman in Milwaukee and was one of the founders of the Milwaukee Chamber of Commerce. He was elected the first President of that organization in 1863.

His success as President of the Chamber of Commerce led to his election as Mayor of Milwaukee in 1865. The day of the inauguration of Mayor Tallmadge happened to coincide with the news of the assassination of Abraham Lincoln, thus Tallmadge's first act as Mayor was to proclaim a symbolic funeral procession through Milwaukee, held on April 20, 1865.

He was re-elected as Mayor in 1866. After leaving office, in 1867, he was the Democratic Party nominee for Governor of Wisconsin in the 1867 gubernatorial election. In the election, Tallmadge was defeated by incumbent Republican Governor and Civil War hero Lucius Fairchild.

After the gubernatorial election, Tallmadge retired from politics and spent the remainder of his years focused on his business interests. In 1869, Tallmadge was one of the founding signatories of the incorporation of the Northwestern National Insurance Company in Milwaukee.

== Personal life and family ==
John James Tallmadge was the seventh of eight children born to James Tallmadge and Anne (née West). The Tallmadge family were descendants of Thomas Talmadge, who emigrated from England to the Massachusetts Bay Colony in 1631. The Tallmadge family produced many notable businessmen, military officers, and public officeholders in 18th and 19th century America. Nathaniel P. Tallmadge, who had been Governor of the Wisconsin Territory in 1844 and 1845, was a first cousin of John's father, James Tallmadge.

John J. Tallmadge married Harriet Jacobs on January 3, 1840. They had six children, of which four survived to adulthood.

Tallmadge died on October 16, 1873, in Summit, Waukesha County, Wisconsin.

Party political offices
Preceded by Harrison Carroll Hobart	Democratic nominee for Governor of Wisconsin; 1867	Succeeded by Charles D. Robinson
Political offices
Preceded by Abner Kirby	Mayor of Milwaukee; April 16, 1865 – April 23, 1867	Succeeded by Edward O'Neill
