= Daniel H. Richards =

19th century American politician

Member of the Wisconsin State Assembly from the Milwaukee 6th district
- In office January 5, 1874 – January 3, 1876
- Preceded by: Casper Sanger
- Succeeded by: Charles Kraatz
- In office January 3, 1870 – January 1, 1872
- Preceded by: Joseph Phillips
- Succeeded by: Casper Sanger
- In office January 6, 1868 – January 4, 1869
- Preceded by: Joseph Phillips
- Succeeded by: Joseph Phillips

Personal details
- Born: February 12, 1808 Burlington, New York, U.S.
- Died: February 6, 1877 (aged 68) Milwaukee, Wisconsin, U.S.
- Cause of death: Stroke
- Resting place: Forest Home Cemetery, Milwaukee
- Party: Democratic
- Spouse: Sarah Amanda Richards (died 1890)
- Children: Arthur B. Richards^{(b. 1840; died 1864)}; Henry B. Richards^{(b. 1849; died 1929)}
- Occupation: Newspaper publisher

Daniel Hamilton Richards (February 12, 1808 – February 6, 1877) was an American newspaper publisher, Democratic politician, and Wisconsin pioneer. He was the founder and original printer of the Milwaukee Advertiser—the first newspaper printed in Milwaukee. He also served five terms in the Wisconsin State Assembly, representing the north side of Milwaukee.

== Biography ==
Born in Burlington, New York, Richards moved to Milwaukee in 1835, when it was still part of the Michigan Territory. In 1836, he started a newspaper the Milwaukee Advertiser—the third newspaper published in what is now the state of Wisconsin. Richards was a Democrat and served in the Wisconsin State Assembly in 1868, 1870, 1871, 1874, and 1875.

Richards died of a stroke in Milwaukee in February 1877.

His eldest son, Arthur B. Richards, enlisted with the 4th Wisconsin Cavalry Regiment during the American Civil War and died of disease at Baton Rouge, Louisiana.

== Electoral history ==
=== Wisconsin Assembly (1869, 1870, 1871) ===
Wisconsin Assembly, Milwaukee 6th District Election, 1869
Party	Candidate	Votes	%	±%
General Election, November 2, 1869
Democratic	Daniel H. Richards	416	71.11%	
Republican	Harvey Curtis	169	28.89%	
Plurality		247	42.22%	
Total votes		585	100.0%	
Democratic gain from Liberal Republican				

Wisconsin Assembly, Milwaukee 6th District Election, 1870
Party	Candidate	Votes	%	±%
General Election, November 8, 1870
Democratic	Daniel H. Richards (incumbent)	593	100.0%	
Total votes		593	100.0%	+1.37%
Democratic hold				

Wisconsin Assembly, Milwaukee 6th District Election, 1871
Party	Candidate	Votes	%	±%
General Election, November 7, 1871
Republican	Emil Wallber	305	52.68%	
Democratic	Daniel H. Richards (incumbent)	274	47.32%	
Plurality		31	5.35%	
Total votes		579	100.0%	-2.36%
Republican gain from Democratic				

=== Wisconsin Assembly (1873, 1874) ===
Wisconsin Assembly, Milwaukee 6th District Election, 1873
Party	Candidate	Votes	%	±%
General Election, November 4, 1873
Democratic	Daniel H. Richards	986	93.46%	
Independent	C. M. Sanger	69	6.54%	
Plurality		917	86.92%	
Total votes		1,055	100.0%	+27.42%
Democratic hold				

Wisconsin Assembly, Milwaukee 6th District Election, 1874
Party	Candidate	Votes	%	±%
General Election, November 3, 1874
Democratic	Daniel H. Richards (incumbent)	656	57.14%	−36.32%
Independent	W. K. Wilson	492	42.86%	
Plurality		164	14.29%	
Total votes		1,148	100.0%	+8.82%
Democratic hold				

Wisconsin State Assembly
Preceded by Joseph Phillips	Member of the Wisconsin State Assembly from the Milwaukee 6th district January 6, 1868 – January 4, 1869	Succeeded by Joseph Phillips
Preceded by Joseph Phillips	Member of the Wisconsin State Assembly from the Milwaukee 6th district January 3, 1870 – January 1, 1872	Succeeded by Casper Sanger
Preceded by Casper Sanger	Member of the Wisconsin State Assembly from the Milwaukee 6th district January 5, 1874 – January 3, 1876	Succeeded by Charles Kraatz
