= Abner Kirby =

19th century American politician

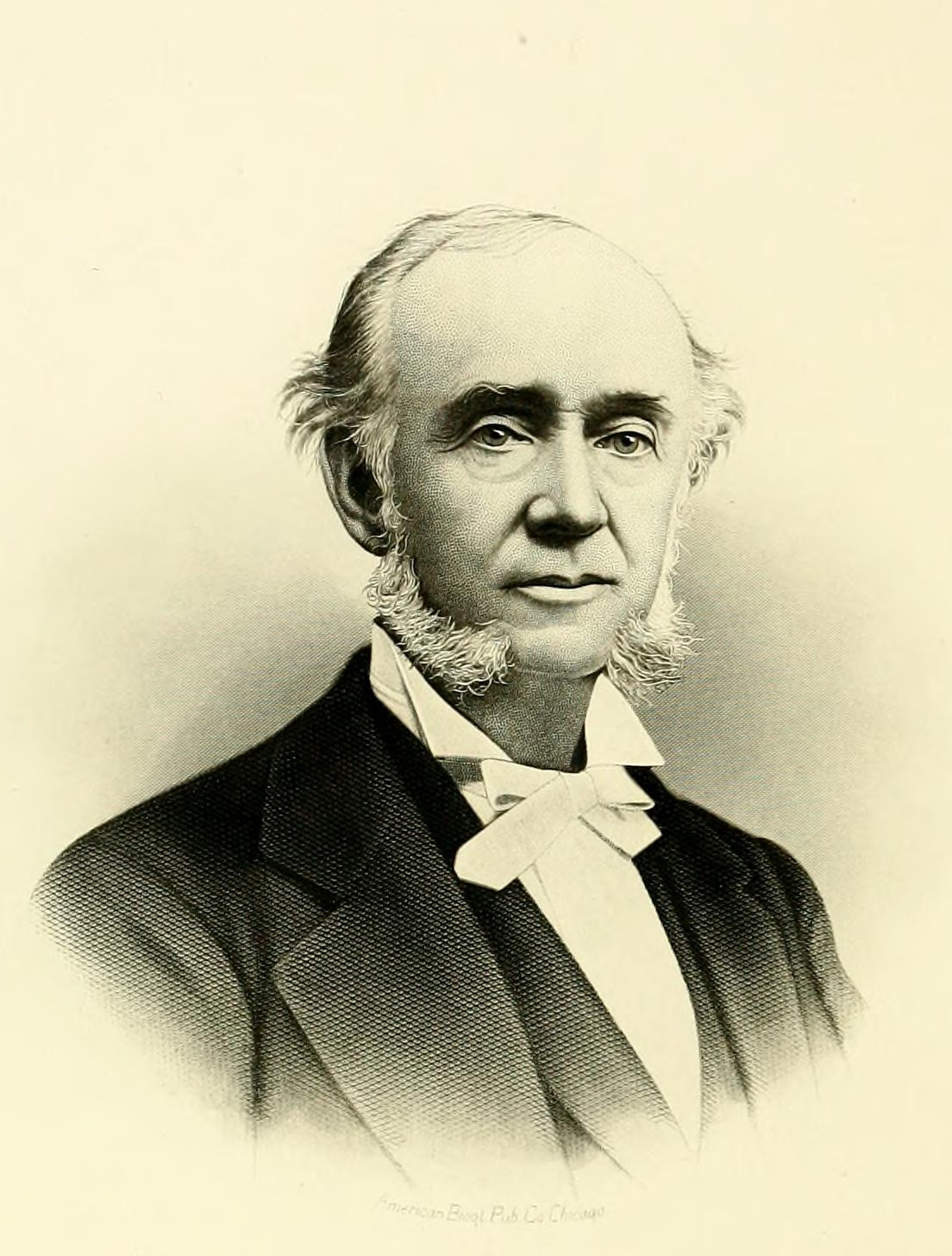
- From History of Milwaukee from its first settlement to the year 1895 (1895)

16th Mayor of Milwaukee, Wisconsin
- In office April 1864 – April 15, 1865
- Preceded by: Edward O'Neill
- Succeeded by: John J. Tallmadge

Personal details
- Born: April 11, 1818 Starks, District of Maine, Massachusetts, U.S.
- Died: September 23, 1893 (aged 75) Milwaukee, Wisconsin, U.S.
- Resting place: Forest Home Cemetery, Milwaukee
- Party: Democratic
- Spouses: Rebecca F. Chase (died 1849); Mary I. Chase (died 1852); Letitia Ramolina Chase (m. 1854–1893)
- Children: with Rebecca Chase; Henry M. Kirby^{(b. 1849; died 1890)}; with Letitia Chase; Oak Abner Kirby^{(b. 1854; died 1928)}; Welcome Uriel Kirby^{(b. 1855)}; Grace Azalyn (Houghton)^{(b. 1858)}; Susan Felicia (Britton)^{(b. 1860; died 1921)}; Maude A. (Hendee)^{(b. 1867; died 1940)}
- Occupation: Jeweler, freight shipper, hotelier, businessman

Military service
- Allegiance: United States
- Branch/service: Maine militia
- Years of service: 1838–1839
- Battles/wars: Aroostook War

Abner Kirby, Jr., (April 11, 1818 – September 23, 1893) was an American businessman, politician, and Wisconsin pioneer. He was the 16th mayor of Milwaukee, Wisconsin, and played an important role in the early growth and economic development of southeast Wisconsin.

== Early life ==
Abner Kirby, Jr., was born in the town of Starks, Maine, when that area was still part of the state of Massachusetts. Kirby was raised on his father's farm and was educated in the district schools. At age 14, he spent his winters in logging camps, working as a cook because he was too young to chop wood, then bringing the logs down the river in the spring.

Later in his teens, he apprenticed in a jeweler's shop in Bangor, Maine, and, at age 21, he opened his own watchmaker's and jeweler's shop in Skowhegan, Maine. He ran that business for seven years, and while living there was appointed postmaster for three years.

== Business career ==
He prospered in Skowhegan, and then brought his wealth west to the Wisconsin Territory in 1844. He arrived in Milwaukee on May 18, 1844, and quickly bought all the land on the northeast corner of the intersection of Wisconsin and East Water Street. He built a sturdy brick building on this corner and operated a jewelry store out of the ground floor for the next ten years.

With the profits from his jewelry business, he involved himself in other frontier business ventures. He was involved in the lumber trade, operating a saw mill in Menominee, Michigan, and shipping the lumber to Milwaukee for sale. He incorporated his lumber business as Kirby, Carpenter, & Company, and later reincorporated as the Kirby-Carpenter Company. In 1861, he moved his lumber yard from Milwaukee to Chicago and became one of the most prolific lumber dealers in that city. He also used a portion of his lumber to establish a match factory in Milwaukee.

For the needs of his lumber business, he also became involved in shipping, and manufactured large wooden ships for moving his products on Lake Michigan. He was the first to manufacture steam barges for use on Lake Michigan, naming his first steam ship the Cream City. He soon became the owner of one of the largest fleets of shipping vessels on Lake Michigan.

After exiting the lumber business in 1880, he became heavily invested in manufacturing threshing machines and other farm machinery in a firm known as Kirby, Langworthy, & Company. Around this time he also converted his match factory into a starch factory, later known as the Milwaukee Starch Works. His shipping business shifted to carrying grain and starch.

== Kirby House ==
In 1856, amidst his other ventures, he became part owner of a hotel in partnership with Daniel Wells, Jr., who had started the business in 1844. In 1862, Kirby became the sole proprietor, at which time he enlarged and completely remodeled the building, renaming it the Kirby House. The Kirby House eventually became the center of his business empire and one of the most popular hotels in the western states.

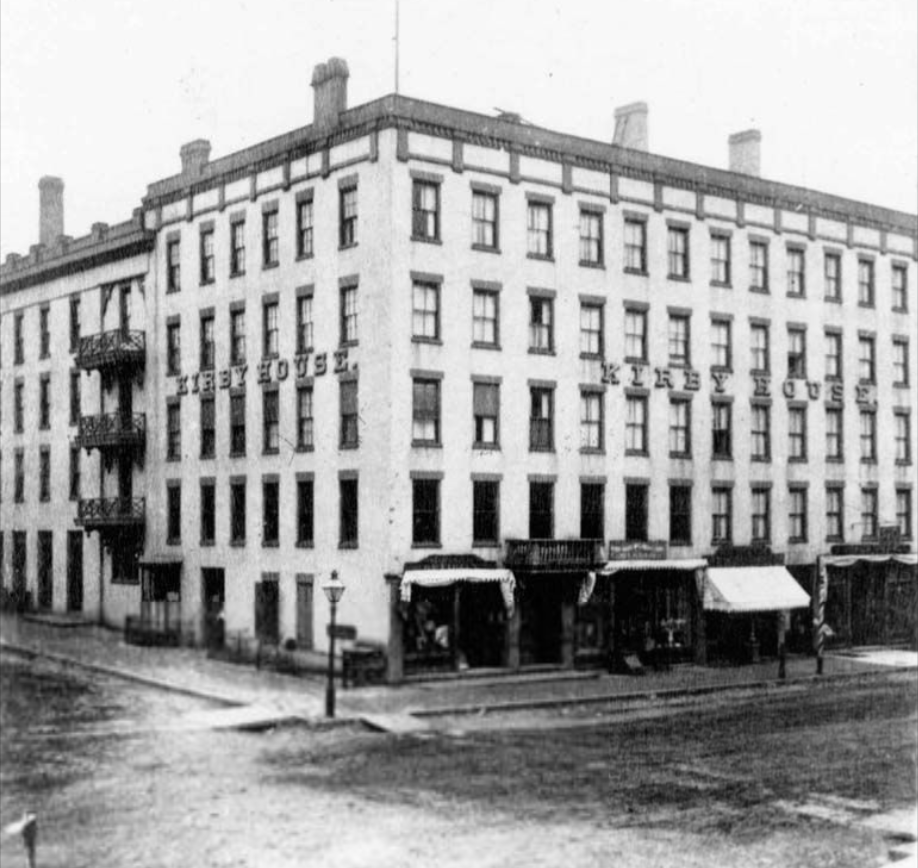
Kirby House

Kirby was often described as "eccentric" or a "live wire". While operating his hotel, he took on the slogan "Wake me up when Kirby dies!"—an old theater joke referring to the dramatic death scenes of actor J. Hudson Kirby—and had the slogan painted in large gold letters behind the hotel welcome desk.

== Civil War and political career ==
Kirby was always a member of the Democratic Party, but was a well known and vocal War Democrat during the American Civil War. He attempted to enlist in the Union Army but was supposedly refused because of his old age. He is said to have spent $12,000 to support the families of 40 men who he had solicited to enlist as a company for the war effort, and spent more of his own fortune for wounded and sick veterans. Throughout the war, his hotel was a gathering place for Union organizers in a city that was somewhat ambivalent to the war and hostile to the draft. Supposedly, Abraham Lincoln also stayed at his hotel during the war.

During the war, Kirby was elected to his own political office. He was elected mayor of Milwaukee in 1864 without opposition. When he received word of the surrender of Richmond, Virginia—near the end of his term as mayor—he issued an "edict" announcing the surrender and notifying the citizens that any man found sober that day would be thrown in prison.

Word of Lincoln's assassination arrived in Milwaukee on the last day of Kirby's term as mayor, at which he issued the proclamation:

The joy of the nation is turned into mourning! The Chief Magistrate of our country is reported to have been slain at the hands of an assassin, and the life of our Secretary of Slate taken by a still more infamous hind. Therefore, I, Abner Kirby, Mayor of Milwaukee, do hereby recommend that all the dwellings and business places of our city forthwith be clad in mourning, as a token of the deep and common sorrow that prevails; and that the people, abstaining from all excitement improper for such solemn occasion, postpone their ordinary business duties today, and that in all the churches, tomorrow, such services be performed as will duly express the great and general grief.

== Personal life and family ==
Abner Kirby, Jr., was a son of Abner Kirby of Westport, Massachusetts, and his second wife Nancy Crosby (née Hume). His father served as a drummer boy during the American Revolutionary War, and later served in the Massachusetts militia during the War of 1812. The Kirby family were descendants of Quaker colonists of the Massachusetts Bay Colony.

Abner Kirby, Jr., married three times. His first wife was Rebecca Chase, of Hartford, Maine. She died in 1849 after they had at least one child. After her death, Kirby married her sister, Mary I. Chase. She died shortly later, in 1852. Both of his first two wives were said to have died of Tuberculosis. In 1854, Kirby married his third and final wife, Letitia Ramolina Chase, of Amsterdam, New York, possibly a cousin of his previous wives. With his third wife, Kirby had at least five more children.

Owing to his eccentricity, some of his children were given unusual names. His second son, Oak, was named such because he was born while Kirby was awaiting a large shipment of oak lumber for his business. His third son, "Welcome U.", was named because of his happiness to have won a bet over the child's gender.

Kirby died at his home in Milwaukee on September 23, 1893. He was buried at Milwaukee's historic Forest Home Cemetery.

The Kirby House hotel was demolished in 1929 and replaced with the First Wisconsin Bank Building.

Political offices
Preceded by Edward O'Neill	Mayor of Milwaukee; April 1864 – April 1865	Succeeded by John J. Tallmadge
