= Emil Wallber =

American lawyer and judge, 27th Mayor of Milwaukee, Wisconsin

The Honorable Emil Wallber
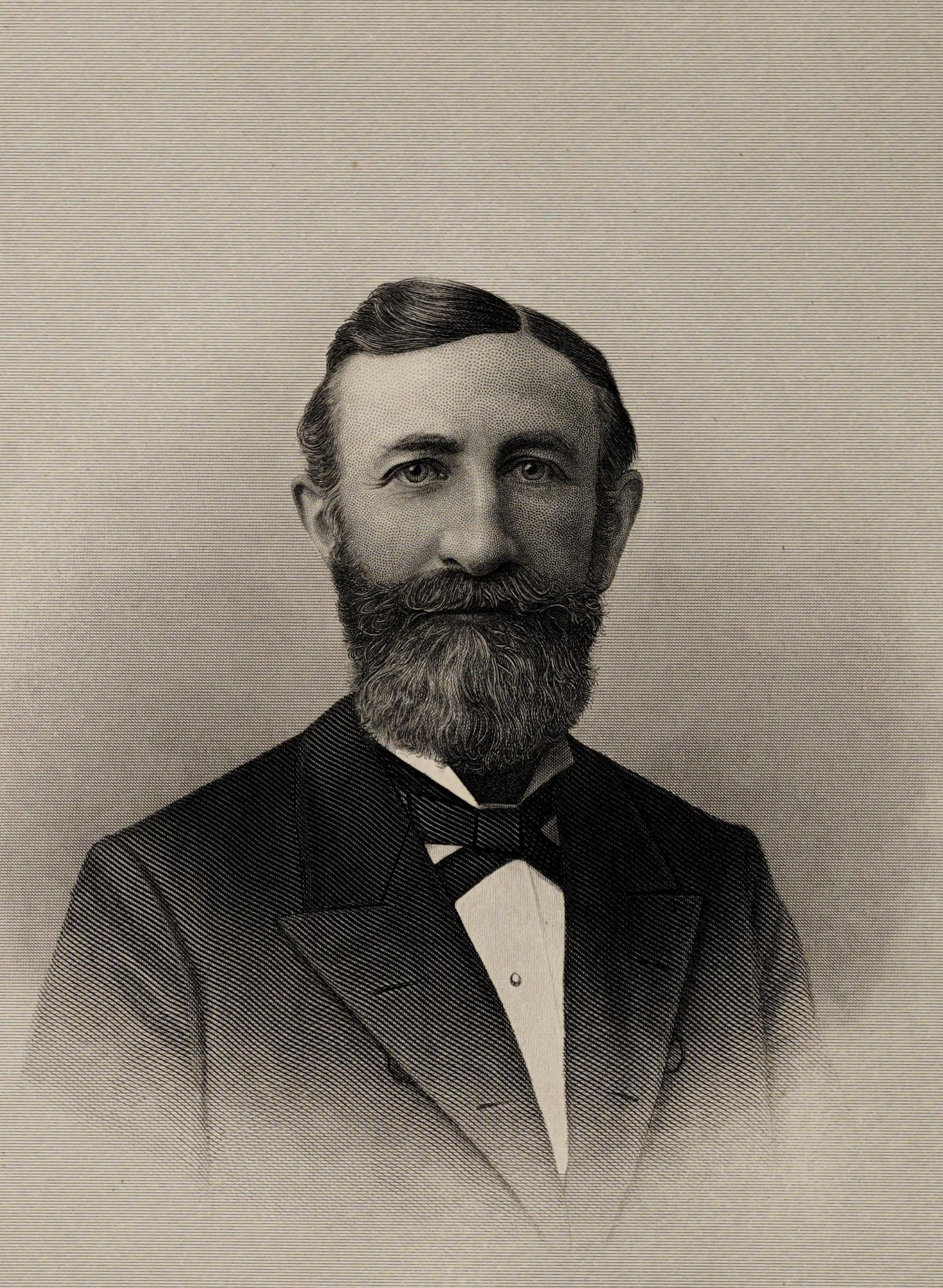

27th Mayor of Milwaukee
- In office April 1884 – April 1888
- Preceded by: John M. Stowell
- Succeeded by: Thomas H. Brown

Member of the Wisconsin State Assembly from the Milwaukee 6th district
- In office January 1, 1872 – January 6, 1873
- Preceded by: Daniel H. Richards
- Succeeded by: Casper Sanger

Personal details
- Born: May 1, 1841 Berlin, Prussia
- Died: June 2, 1923 (aged 82) Milwaukee, Wisconsin, U.S.
- Resting place: Forest Home Cemetery, Milwaukee
- Party: Republican
- Spouse: Minna Wallber (died 1914)
- Children: Emma Henriette Wallber; (b. 1876; died 1881)
- Parents: Julius Wallber (father); Henrietta (Krohn) Wallber (mother)
- Profession: Lawyer, judge

Emil Wallber (April 1, 1841 – June 2, 1923) was a German American lawyer and judge. He was the Mayor of Milwaukee, Wisconsin, at the time of the Bay View massacre and labor strike, and adopted the city's first ordinance on an eight-hour work day.

== Early life and career ==
Born in Berlin, Prussia, Wallber immigrated to the United States with his family in 1850. He is the son of Julius and Henrietta Krohn Wallber, both of whom had also been born in Berlin. They settled in New York City, where he was educated in the public schools and the New York free academy.

At age 14, Wallber moved to Milwaukee, intent on studying law. He first took a position as a clerk for Charles F. Bode, who was then justice of the peace. He then went to study in the law offices of Edward Salomon and Winfield Smith, who would later become the governor and Attorney General of Wisconsin, respectively. Salomon was elected lieutenant governor in 1861, and became governor on the death of Governor Harvey in April 1862. On ascending to the governorship, Salomon hired Wallber as his chief clerk. Wallber served with Governor Salomon until the end of his term in January 1864. Wallber meanwhile continued his study of the law and was admitted to the State Bar of Wisconsin later that year. He then returned to the service of Winfield Smith as an assistant attorney general and remained in that role until the end of Smith's term in 1866.

== Elected office ==
Wallber then returned to Milwaukee and practiced law. He was elected as a school commissioner, and served as president of the school board from 1871 to 1873. He was elected to serve in the Wisconsin State Assembly for the 1872 session, and served as Milwaukee City Attorney from 1873 to 1878. He was County court commissioner for ten years, and from 1883 to 1890 was a regent of the state normal schools.

He was elected Mayor of Milwaukee in 1884 and was re-elected in 1886. During his second term as mayor, there was a major labor walkout during agitation for the eight-hour workday. The strikes closed virtually every business in Milwaukee, starting on May Day, May 1, 1886. At Wallber's request, the Governor, Jeremiah McLain Rusk, called up the Wisconsin National Guard. In what's now known as the Bay View massacre, on May 5, the national guard fired into the protesters as they marched on the North Chicago Rolling Mills in Bay View. Seven people died as a result, including a thirteen year old boy.

In April 1889, the year after he left the Mayors office, Wallber was elected judge of the municipal court. He was re-elected in 1895 and left office in 1902. In his later life, he served as a German consular agent in Milwaukee from 1906 to his retirement in 1917.

Wallber is buried at Forest Home Cemetery in Milwaukee.

== Electoral history ==
=== Wisconsin Assembly (1871) ===
Wisconsin Assembly, Milwaukee 6th District Election, 1871
Party	Candidate	Votes	%	±%
General Election, November 7, 1871
Republican	Emil Wallber	305	52.68%	
Democratic	Daniel H. Richards (incumbent)	274	47.32%	
Plurality		31	5.35%	
Total votes		579	100.0%	-2.36%
Republican gain from Democratic				

Wisconsin State Assembly
Preceded by Daniel H. Richards	Member of the Wisconsin State Assembly from the Milwaukee 6th district January 1, 1872 – January 6, 1873	Succeeded by Casper Sanger
Political offices
Preceded by John M. Stowell	Mayor of Milwaukee, Wisconsin; April 1884 – April 1888	Succeeded by Thomas H. Brown
