= Joseph Phillips (Wisconsin politician) =

American politician (1825–1906)

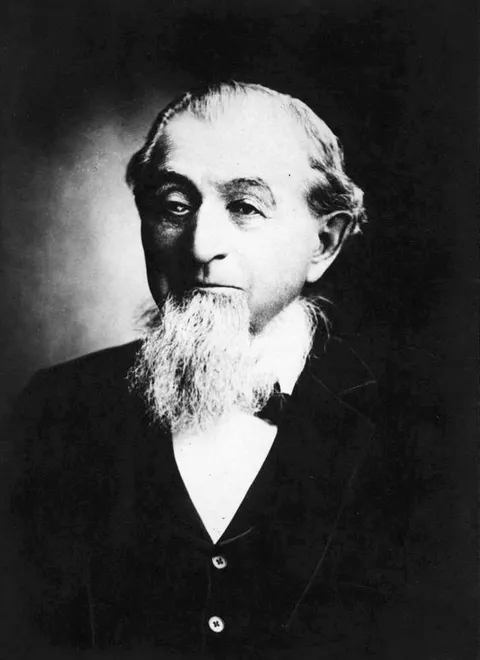
- Phillips c. 1870–1871

19th Mayor of Milwaukee
- In office April 1870 – April 1871
- Preceded by: Edward O'Neill
- Succeeded by: Harrison Ludington

Member of the Wisconsin State Assembly from the Milwaukee 6th district
- In office January 4, 1869 – January 3, 1870
- Preceded by: Daniel H. Richards
- Succeeded by: Daniel H. Richards
- In office January 1, 1866 – January 6, 1868
- Preceded by: Jacob Obermann
- Succeeded by: Daniel H. Richards

Personal details
- Born: November 6, 1825 Alsace, France
- Died: September 13, 1906 (aged 80) Milwaukee, Wisconsin, U.S.
- Resting place: Calvary Cemetery, Milwaukee
- Party: Democratic
- Spouses: Mary Anne End (m. 1846; died 1868); Henrietta Liginger (m. 1871–1906)
- Children: with Mary Anne End; George Joseph Phillips^{(b. 1850; died 1919)}; Henry A. Phillips^{(b. 1854; died 1887)}; Charles Hermann Phillips^{(b. 1859; died 1938)}; Clara (Ramstack)^{(b. 1860; died 1935)}; Elizabeth R. (Rebhan)^{(b. 1862; died 1921)}; Edward F. Phillips^{(b. 1865; died 1937)}; Catherine A. (Ransom)^{(b. 1868; died 1961)}; 2 other daughters; with Henrietta Liginger; Joseph Phillips^{(b. 1876; died 1876)}; Alice Phillips^{(b. 1877; died 1878)}; Joseph Phillips^{(b. 1878; died 1878)}; Walter B. Phillips^{(b. 1882; died 1905)}
- Occupation: Tanner, insurance agent

Joseph Phillips (November 6, 1825 – September 13, 1906) was an Alsatian American immigrant, businessman, and Wisconsin pioneer. He was the 19th mayor of Milwaukee, Wisconsin, serving from April 1870 to April 1871, and also represented the city for three terms in the Wisconsin State Assembly (1866, 1867, 1869).

== Early life ==
Joseph Phillips was born in the Alsace region of France. As a child, he emigrated with his parents to the United States, settling first in Lancaster, New York, and later moving to Buffalo. In 1842, he moved west to Milwaukee, Wisconsin Territory, where he was employed as a clerk in a general merchandise store.

== Business career ==
After some time, Phillips purchased the business in partnership with George End and operated it for several years as "Phillips & End". He also married Mary Anne End, the sister of his business partner. The partnership continued for more than 20 years, until George End moved to Sheboygan.

Phillips then established a tannery business and operated it for nearly a decade before selling the business to Pfister & Vogel Leather Co. in 1877. At that point, he went into the fire insurance business, establishing the firm that he would manage until his death. In 1884 he took on his son-in-law, August Rebhan, as a partner and the firm was known as Phillips & Rebhan thereafter. By the time of his death, it was the largest fire insurance company in Milwaukee.

== Political career ==
Phillips was a German Catholic and early in his life in Milwaukee—as with many others of his demographic—he became associated with the Democratic Party of Wisconsin. He was elected to the Milwaukee City Council in the 1850s, and was then elected to several terms as city treasurer. He was subsequently elected to three terms in the Wisconsin State Assembly, serving in the 1866, 1867, and 1869 sessions. He represented what was then Milwaukee's sixth ward, which then comprised the city's north side, west of the Milwaukee River.

In the 1870 spring election, he was elected mayor of Milwaukee, running on the Democratic ticket. His term as mayor was dominated by a controversy over his attempt to enforce a Sunday law—requiring saloons and bars to close on Sundays. He ran for re-election in 1871 and lost in a landslide to Republican Harrison Ludington.

== Personal life and family ==
Joseph Phillips married Mary Anne End in 1848. They had four sons and five daughters before Mary died in 1868. Their third son was Charles H. Phillips, who went on to become a prominent lawyer in Milwaukee and served in the Wisconsin State Senate in the 1930s. Their daughter, Elizabeth, married August Rebhan of Racine, Wisconsin, and had three children. After the death of his first wife, Joseph Phillips married Henrietta Liginger in February 1871. He had at least four children with his second wife, but three died in infancy and the fourth died young.

From 1873 until his death, he resided at what is known as the "Casper Sanger House", part of the Brewers Hill Historic District in the National Register of Historic Places.

== Electoral history ==
Milwaukee Mayoral Election, 1871
Party	Candidate	Votes	%	±%
General Election, April 4, 1871
Republican	Harrison Ludington	5,197	81.17%	
Democratic	Joseph Phillips (incumbent)	1,206	18.83%	
Plurality		3,991	62.33%	
Total votes		6,403	100.0%	
Republican gain from Democratic				

Wisconsin State Assembly
Preceded by Jacob Obermann	Member of the Wisconsin State Assembly from the Milwaukee 6th district January 1, 1866 – January 6, 1868	Succeeded by Daniel H. Richards
Preceded by Daniel H. Richards	Member of the Wisconsin State Assembly from the Milwaukee 6th district January 4, 1869 – January 3, 1870	Succeeded by Daniel H. Richards
Political offices
Preceded by Edward O'Neill	Mayor of Milwaukee, Wisconsin; April 1870 – April 1871	Succeeded by Harrison Ludington
