= 1867 Wisconsin gubernatorial election =

- November 5, 1867
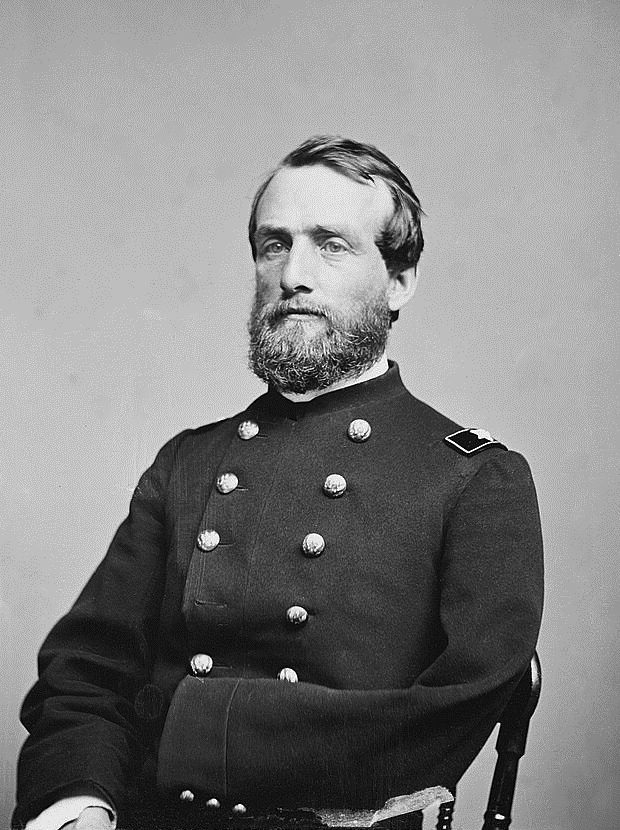

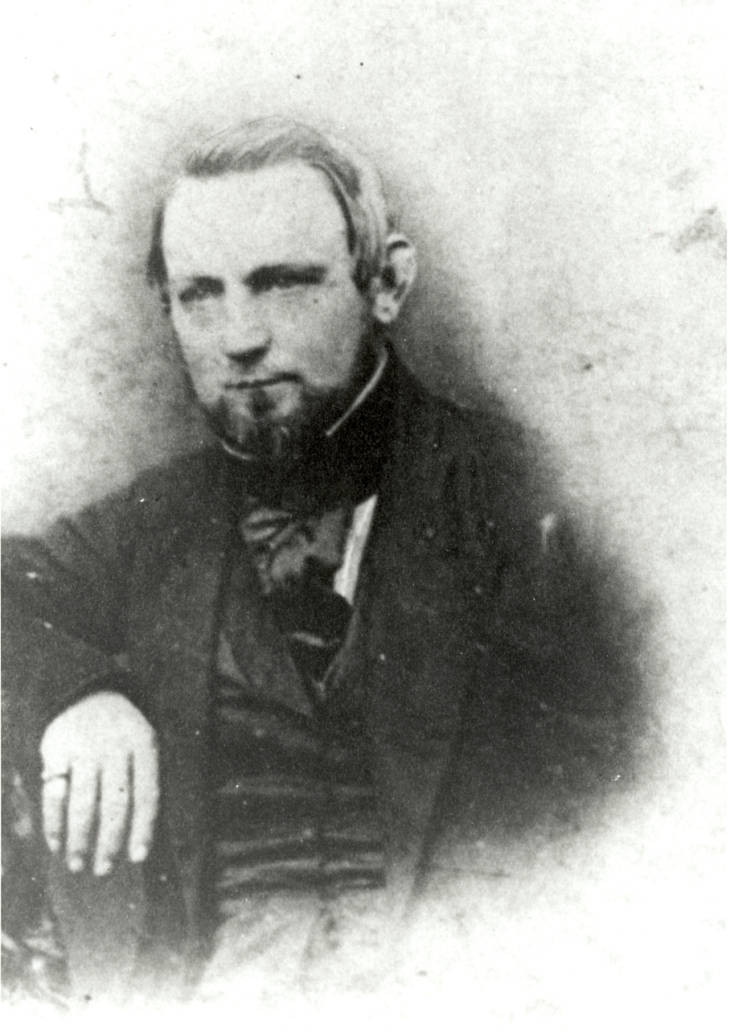
Nominee	Lucius Fairchild	John J. Tallmadge
Party	Republican	Democratic
Popular vote	73,637	68,873
Percentage	51.67%	48.32%
- County results Fairchild : 50–60% 60–70% 70–80% 80–90% >90% Tallmadge : 50–60% 60–70% 80–90% >90%
Governor before election
Lucius Fairchild
Republican
Elected Governor
Lucius Fairchild
Republican

The 1867 Wisconsin gubernatorial election was held on November 5, 1867. Incumbent Republican Party Governor Lucius Fairchild won re-election with nearly 52% of the vote, defeating Democratic candidate John J. Tallmadge.

This was the last election until 1894 in which a Republican carried Fond du Lac County.

== Nominations ==
=== Republican party ===
Lucius Fairchild was the incumbent governor of Wisconsin, having been elected in the 1865 election. Prior to his election as governor, he was Wisconsin Secretary of State for one term. Fairchild had also been a Union Army officer in the American Civil War, having served as a colonel in the famous Iron Brigade when they participated in fierce fighting at Gettysburg. Fairchild lost an arm due to wounds sustained at Gettysburg, and was later awarded an honorary promotion to brigadier general.

=== Democratic party ===
John J. Tallmadge was a businessman and the former mayor of Milwaukee, having left office less than a year before the 1867 election. Prior to his two terms as mayor, he was one of the founders of the Milwaukee Chamber of Commerce and served as its president in 1863 and 1864.

== Results ==
1867 Wisconsin gubernatorial election
Party	Candidate	Votes	%	±%
Republican	Lucius Fairchild (incumbent)	73,637	51.67%	−3.02%
Democratic	John J. Tallmadge	68,873	48.32%	+3.02%
	Scattering	12	0.01%	
Majority		4,764	3.34%	
Total votes		142,522	100.00%	
Republican hold		Swing	-6.03%	

=== Results by county ===
County	Lucius Fairchild Republican		John J. Tallmadge Democratic		Margin		Total votes cast
County	#	%	#	%	#	%	Total votes cast
Adams	624	76.28%	194	23.72%	430	52.57%	818
Ashland	3	8.11%	34	91.89%	-31	-83.78%	37
Bayfield	12	57.14%	9	42.86%	3	14.29%	21
Brown	815	40.11%	1,217	59.89%	-402	-19.78%	2,032
Buffalo	708	64.60%	388	35.40%	320	29.20%	1,096
Burnett	41	87.23%	6	12.77%	35	74.47%	47
Calumet	687	45.50%	823	54.50%	-136	-9.01%	1,510
Chippewa	309	46.12%	361	53.88%	-52	-7.76%	670
Clark	233	70.39%	98	29.61%	135	40.79%	331
Columbia	2,649	62.29%	1,603	37.69%	1,046	24.59%	4,253 (Note: Includes 1 Scattering vote)
Crawford	845	45.63%	1,007	54.37%	-162	-8.75%	1,852
Dane	4,530	51.77%	4,217	48.19%	313	3.58%	8,750 (Note: Includes 3 Scattering votes)
Dodge	2,804	36.90%	4,795	63.10%	-1,991	-26.20%	7,599
Door	404	76.37%	125	23.63%	279	52.74%	529
Douglas	51	44.35%	64	55.65%	-13	-11.30%	115
Dunn	679	70.66%	282	29.34%	397	41.31%	961
Eau Claire	662	58.64%	467	41.36%	195	17.27%	1,129
Fond du Lac	3,789	50.61%	3,698	49.39%	91	1.22%	7,487
Grant	3,095	65.24%	1,649	34.76%	1,446	30.48%	4,744
Green	2,094	64.81%	1,137	35.19%	957	29.62%	3,231
Green Lake	1,197	65.16%	640	34.84%	557	30.32%	1,837
Iowa	1,677	51.11%	1,604	48.89%	73	2.22%	3,281
Jackson	736	70.97%	301	29.03%	435	41.95%	1,037
Jefferson	2,344	42.95%	3,112	57.02%	-768	-14.07%	5,458 (Note: Includes 2 Scattering votes)
Juneau	1,030	52.71%	924	47.29%	106	5.42%	1,954
Kenosha	1,173	51.88%	1,088	48.12%	85	3.76%	2,261
Kewaunee	268	32.80%	549	67.20%	-281	-34.39%	817
La Crosse	1,536	56.47%	1,183	43.49%	353	12.98%	2,720
Lafayette	1,526	46.87%	1,730	53.13%	-204	-6.27%	3,256
Manitowoc	1,247	37.11%	2,112	62.86%	-865	-25.74%	3,360
Marathon	90	12.71%	618	87.29%	-528	-74.58%	708
Marquette	445	37.30%	748	62.70%	-303	-25.40%	1,193
Milwaukee	3,500	32.78%	7,176	67.22%	-3,676	-34.43%	10,676
Monroe	1,329	55.56%	1,061	44.36%	268	11.20%	2,392
Oconto	576	68.74%	262	31.26%	314	37.47%	838
Outagamie	949	40.61%	1,388	59.39%	-439	-18.78%	2,337
Ozaukee	220	9.73%	2,042	90.27%	-1,822	-80.55%	2,262
Pepin	302	66.81%	150	33.19%	152	33.63%	452
Pierce	829	68.17%	387	31.83%	442	36.35%	1,216
Polk	224	65.69%	117	34.31%	107	31.38%	341
Portage	972	58.73%	683	41.27%	289	17.46%	1,655
Racine	2,117	56.51%	1,629	43.49%	488	13.03%	3,746
Richland	1,166	56.88%	884	43.12%	282	13.76%	2,050
Rock	4,227	69.79%	1,830	30.21%	2,397	39.57%	6,057
Sauk	2,060	68.69%	939	31.31%	1,121	37.38%	2,999
Shawano	145	49.49%	148	50.51%	-3	-1.02%	293
Sheboygan	1,858	47.17%	2,079	52.78%	-221	-5.61%	3,939
St. Croix	884	53.29%	775	46.71%	109	6.57%	1,659
Trempealeau	622	79.03%	165	20.97%	457	58.07%	787
Vernon	1,443	78.98%	384	21.02%	1,059	57.96%	1,827
Walworth	3,258	71.70%	1,286	28.30%	1,972	43.40%	4,544
Washington	615	19.41%	2,554	80.59%	-1,939	-61.19%	3,169
Waukesha	2,303	46.44%	2,656	53.56%	-353	-7.12%	4,959
Waupaca	1,294	64.25%	720	35.75%	574	28.50%	2,014
Waushara	998	76.13%	313	23.87%	685	52.25%	1,311
Winnebago	3,161	59.97%	2,110	40.03%	1,051	19.94%	5,271
Wood	282	44.48%	352	55.52%	-70	-11.04%	634
Total	73,637	51.67%	68,873	48.32%	4,764	3.34%	142,522

==== Counties that flipped from Republican to Democratic ====
- Ashland
- Shawano
