= Lucius Fairchild =

19th century American general and politician

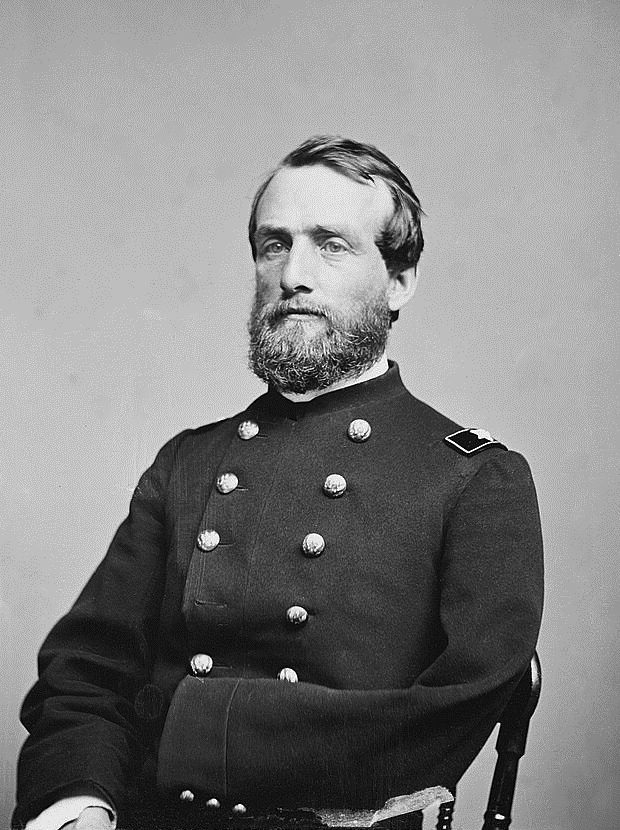
- Fairchild c. 1864

22nd United States Minister to Spain
- In office January 26, 1880 – December 20, 1881
- President: Rutherford B. Hayes; James A. Garfield
- Preceded by: James Russell Lowell
- Succeeded by: Hannibal Hamlin

10th Governor of Wisconsin
- In office January 1, 1866 – January 1, 1872
- Lieutenant: Wyman Spooner; Thaddeus C. Pound
- Preceded by: James T. Lewis
- Succeeded by: Cadwallader C. Washburn

8th Secretary of State of Wisconsin
- In office January 4, 1864 – January 1, 1866
- Governor: James T. Lewis
- Preceded by: James T. Lewis
- Succeeded by: Thomas S. Allen

Personal details
- Born: December 27, 1831 Franklin Mills, Ohio, U.S.
- Died: May 23, 1896 (aged 64) Madison, Wisconsin, U.S.
- Resting place: Forest Hill Cemetery; Madison, Wisconsin
- Party: Democratic (pre war); Republican (post war)
- Spouse: Frances Bull Fairchild
- Children: 5
- Parents: Jairus C. Fairchild (father); Sally (Blair) Fairchild (mother)
- Relatives: Cassius Fairchild (brother)
- Profession: Clerk, Politician, Soldier

Military service
- Allegiance: United States
- Branch/service: United States Volunteers; Union Army
- Years of service: 1858–1863
- Rank: Brigadier General
- Unit: Iron Brigade; Army of the Potomac
- Commands: 2nd Reg. Wis. Vol. Infantry
- Battles/wars: American Civil War; Manassas campaign; Battle of First Bull Run; Northern Virginia campaign; First Battle of Rappahannock Station; Second Bull Run; Maryland campaign; Battle of South Mountain; Battle of Antietam; Fredericksburg campaign; Battle of Fredericksburg; Chancellorsville campaign; Battle of Chancellorsville; Gettysburg campaign; Battle of Gettysburg (WIA)

Lucius Fairchild (December 27, 1831 – May 23, 1896) was an American politician, soldier, and diplomat. He served as the tenth governor of Wisconsin and represented the United States as Minister to Spain under presidents Rutherford B. Hayes and James A. Garfield. He served as a Union Army colonel during the American Civil War and lost an arm at Gettysburg.

== Early life ==
=== Family ===
Lucius Fairchild was born in Kent, Ohio (then Franklin Mills) on December 27, 1831, to Jairus C. Fairchild and Sally Fairchild (nee: Blair), originally from New York. Lucius had one older sister; Sarah Fairchild (1827–1912), one older brother; Cassius Fairchild (1829–1868), and two younger brothers; Charles S. Fairchild (1837–1910) and James Blair Fairchild (1828–1832). Jairus Fairchild worked in a variety of businesses growing up including a tannery, a business owner, a customs official, and an auctioning agent. The Fairchild family eventually moved to Wisconsin Territory in 1846 to Madison where Jairus set up another business and became the became the state treasurer. Jairus was re-elected as state treasurer in 1849 and left office in January 1852. Despite Jairus's many business failures growing up, he eventually became the first Mayor of Madison, Wisconsin in 1856 after Madison was incorporated as a city.

=== California Gold Rush ===
Despite his fathers hard work ethic Fairchild was a troubled student and youth growing up. Fairchild was expelled from school for fighting and preferred to explore, be outside, dance, and explore Cleveland as opposed to study. In 1848 when gold was discovered in California Fairchild left for Council Bluffs, Iowa along with several friends and joined a wagon train headed to California. Once in California Fairchild did not pan for gold, but instead tilled soil, butchered cattle, waited tables, and farmed. Fairchild's hard worked attracted the eye of democrat politician Elijah Steele who eventually became Fairchild's business partner in trading beef. In 1855 after six years in California Fairchild sold his beef business to Steele for $10,000. After selling his business in California Fairchild moved back to Wisconsin.

=== Return to Wisconsin ===
When Fairchild returned to Wisconsin he briefly worked for the railroad before turning to focus on politics with his father Jairus and his elder brother Cassius Fairchild who had both since become heavily involved in the Democratic Party. To help his chances in getting into political office Fairchild became a member of three different church organizations, joined a volunteer fire department for the city of Madison, and joined the Governor's Guard, a local militia. All of these activities led to Fairchild's first political office, in 1858 Fairchild was elected as the municipal clerk of the Dane County Court.

== Military career ==
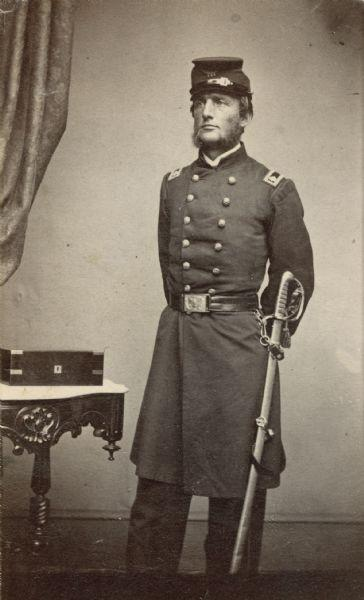
Lucius Fairchild, Lieutenant Colonel of the 2nd Wisconsin Infantry, before his promotion to colonel on November 17, 1862

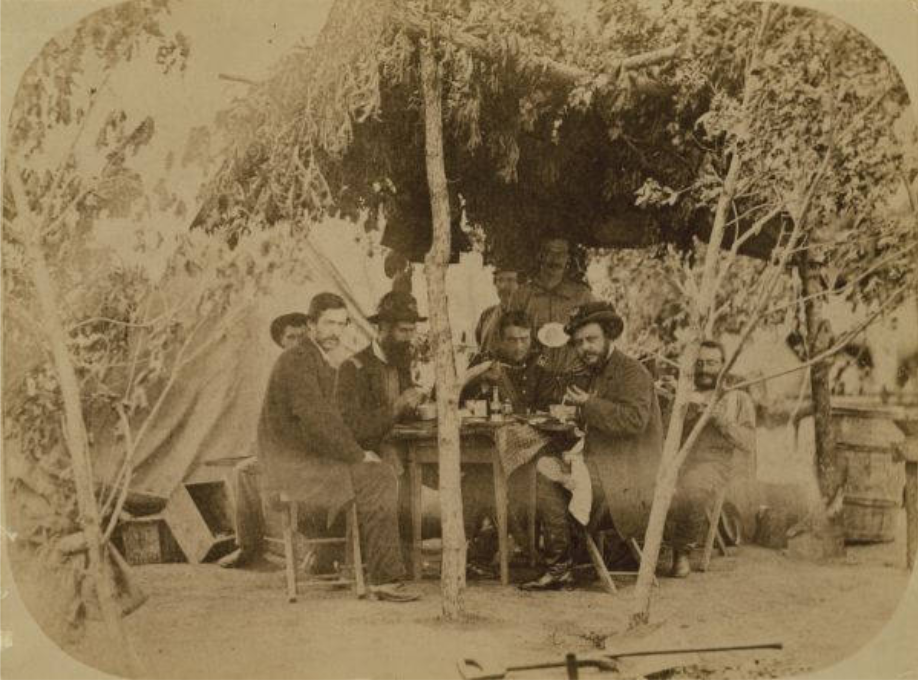
Field officers of the 2nd Wisconsin Vol. Infantry, photographed at a camp in northern Virginia circa 1862. The officers seated, from left, are surgeon A. J. Ward, Major Thomas S. Allen, Lt. Colonel Lucius Fairchild, and Colonel Edgar O'Connor.

In 1858, with the American Civil War looming, Fairchild volunteered as a private with the Wisconsin militia company known as the "Governor's Guard". At the outbreak of the war in 1861, the Governor's Guard was accepted into federal service as Company K of the 1st Wisconsin Infantry Regiment. With the 1st Wisconsin Infantry, he served at the Battle of Hoke's Run against the "Stonewall Brigade" of General Thomas J. Jackson.

In August 1861, the enlistments of the 1st Wisconsin Infantry expired and Fairchild was appointed captain in the 16th U.S. Infantry as well as major of the 2nd Wisconsin Volunteer Infantry Regiment. The 2nd Wisconsin served in the brigade commanded by General William T. Sherman until the general reorganization of the Union army following the First Battle of Bull Run. Electing to stay with the 2nd Wisconsin Infantry, Fairchild was soon commissioned lieutenant colonel and, with his regiment now a part of the famed Iron Brigade within the Army of the Potomac, participated in the Second Battle of Bull Run. One week thereafter, on September 8, 1862, he was promoted to the rank of colonel of the 2nd Wisconsin Infantry. On February 27, 1863, the Iron Brigade, now under the command of Brig. Gen. Solomon Meredith, was re-designated the "1st Brigade, 1st Division, I Corps", which gave Fairchild the distinction of being the ranking officer among all commissioned officers within the I Corps of the Army of the Potomac during the Spring and Summer of 1863.

Fairchild and the 2nd Wisconsin Infantry distinguished themselves at the Battle of Antietam, and then again at Seminary Ridge during the first day of fighting at the Battle of Gettysburg on July 1, 1863, being the first infantry regiment to make close contact with the Confederate Army. During the engagement, at approximately 10:00, the 2nd Wisconsin Infantry delivered a striking blow by capturing very first Confederate general officer of the war, Brig. Gen. James J. Archer. Almost immediately after this success, the regiment was ambushed by an attack on their right flank, losing seventy-seven percent of their ranks, including most officers. Fairchild was shot in the upper arm, captured, tended to, and released. While recovering from his amputated left arm, Fairchild was commissioned as a brigadier general by President Abraham Lincoln on October 19, 1863, but the appointment was not confirmed by the Senate.

== Political and diplomatic career ==
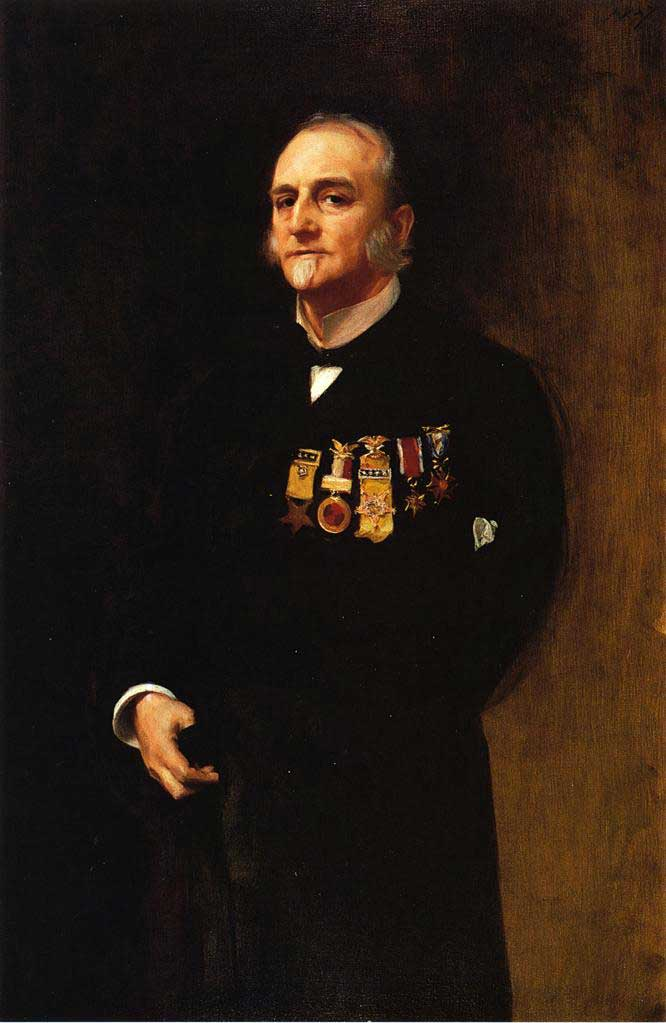
General Lucius Fairchild, John Singer Sargent, 1887

Fairchild resigned from the military in November 1863 and was appointed Secretary of State of Wisconsin (1864–1866), before being elected three term Governor of Wisconsin (1866–1872). After his time as governor, Fairchild was appointed U.S. consul at Liverpool (1871) and then consul general at Paris (1880–1881), Fairchild was Envoy Extraordinary and Minister Plenipotentiary to Spain.

Fairchild later served as Commander-in-Chief of the Grand Army of the Republic (1886–1887) and of the Military Order of the Loyal Legion of the United States (1893–1895); during the former of these terms, he came to national prominence for calling upon God to "palsy" President Grover Cleveland for offering to return several captured Confederate battle flags to the veterans of their respective regiments as a peace gesture towards the South. He was also a member of the Society of the Army of the Potomac. Fairchild also received 95 degrees in the Masonic Order "Egyptian Masonic Rite of Memphis". He died in Madison, Wisconsin in May 1896, and was buried at Forest Hill Cemetery.

Fairchild was also known as an outspoken "Radical Republican", he fervently supported civil rights for blacks and vehemently opposed Rutherford B. Hayes for "appeasing" southern segregationists in what he referred to as "the second civil war". He believed Reconstruction ended too early, and on terms he described as "cowardly" and "disgraceful". He supported Wisconsin Senator Timothy O. Howe in pushing for more severe measures in the South that would guarantee civil rights by force.

== Family ==
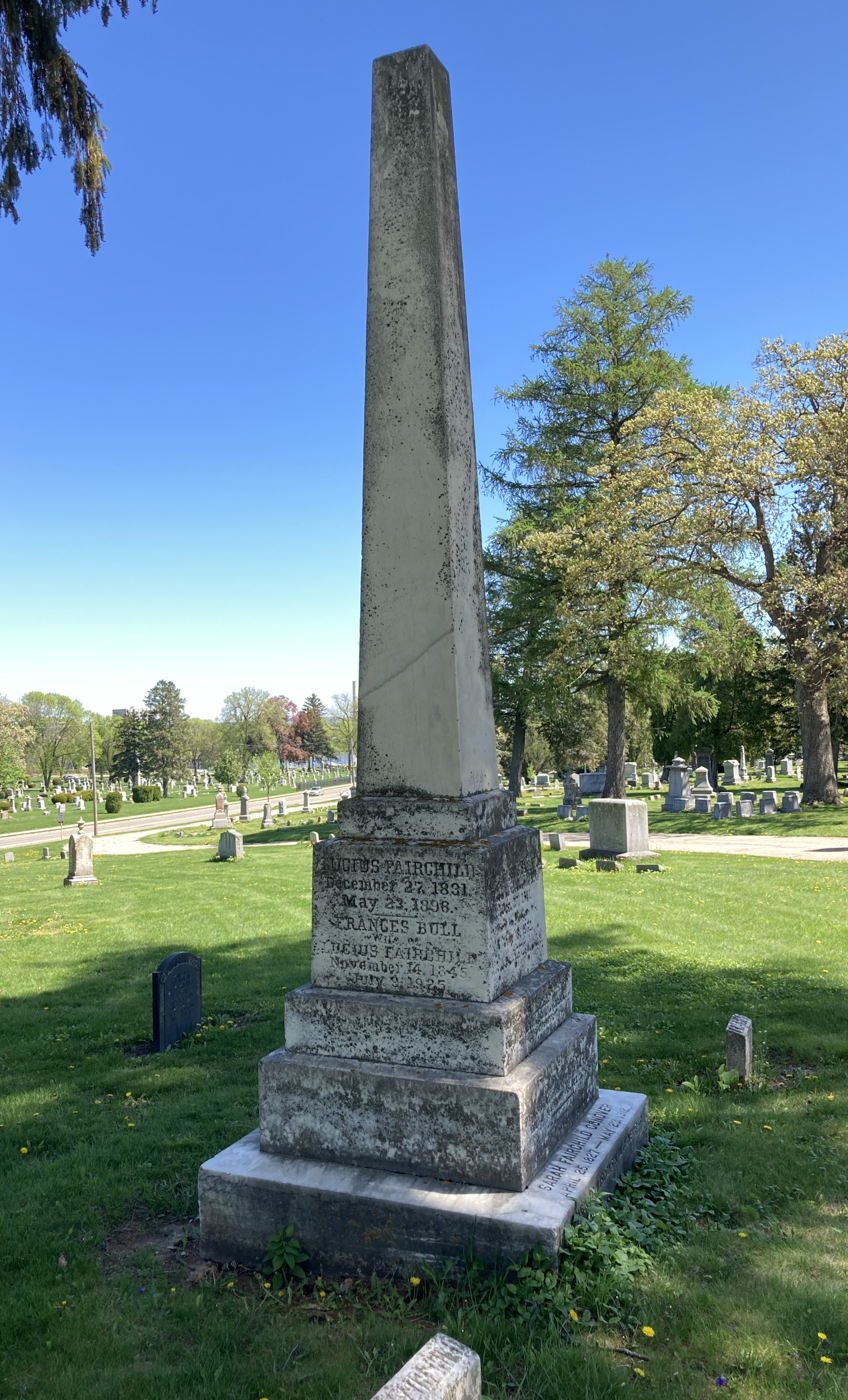
Fairchild's grave at Forest Hill Cemetery

Lucius Fairchild was of entirely English ancestry. His family tree can be traced through three large migrations. Firstly all of his ancestors migrated from England to New England during the Puritan migration to New England during the early colonial period, between 1620 and 1640. In the immediate aftermath of the American Revolution all of Fairchild's ancestors moved from New England to the region of upstate New York, and only one generation after that, following the Northwest Indian War they moved to the northern part of Ohio. Fairchild had a grandfather and a great-grandfather who fought in the American Revolution.

Fairchild is a descendant of Thomas Fairchild who emigrated to North America in 1639. His parents were Sally (Blair) and Jairus C. Fairchild, who was the first State Treasurer of Wisconsin and the first Mayor of the city of Madison, Wisconsin. His brother, Cassius Fairchild, served as Democratic Party Leader in the Wisconsin State Assembly, and also served in the Union Army during the American Civil War with the rank of colonel (and brevet brigadier general). His brother Charles served in the Union Navy during the war. His wife was Frances Bull Fairchild, and together they had three daughters: Mary, Sarah, and Caryl.

== Legacy ==
The town of Fairchild, Wisconsin and the 422-foot (129 m) Liberty ship SS Lucius Fairchild, built in 1943 in Portland, Oregon for the United States War Shipping Administration, were named in his honor, as was Mount Fairchild (13,502'), a prominent peak located in Rocky Mountain National Park, Colorado. In Kent, Ohio, where Fairchild was born in 1831, Fairchild Avenue is named after him. Fairchild visited Kent with much fanfare in 1887 and the road was officially named for him in 1904. A John Singer Sargent portrait of General Fairchild is housed at the Wisconsin Historical Museum located in Madison, Wisconsin. Fairchild Mountain in Rocky Mountain National Park was also named in his honor after his visit to Colorado.

== Electoral history ==
Wisconsin Gubernatorial Election, 1865
Party	Candidate	Votes	%	±%
General Election, November 7, 1865
Republican	Lucius Fairchild	58,332	54.68%	−4.91%
Democratic	Harrison Carroll Hobart	48,330	45.31%	5.11%
	Scattering	12	0.01%	
Total votes		'106,674'	'100.0%'	-12.58%
Republican hold				

Wisconsin Gubernatorial Election, 1867
Party	Candidate	Votes	%	±%
General Election, November 5, 1867
Republican	Lucius Fairchild (incumbent)	73,637	51.67%	−3.02%
Democratic	John J. Tallmadge	68,873	48.32%	+3.02%
	Scattering	12	0.01%	
Total votes		'142,522'	'100.0%'	+33.61%
Republican hold				

Wisconsin Gubernatorial Election, 1869
Party	Candidate	Votes	%	±%
General Election, November 2, 1869
Republican	Lucius Fairchild (incumbent)	69,502	53.14%	+1.48%
Democratic	Charles D. Robinson	61,239	46.83%	−1.50%
	Scattering	40	0.03%	
Total votes		'130,781'	'100.0%'	-8.24%
Republican hold				

== See also ==
- Fairchild family
- List of American Civil War generals (Union)
- List of U.S. political families-Fairchild
- Ellen Southard

== Bibliography ==
- Gilmore, Jean Fairchild. Early Fairchilds in America and Their Descendants. Baltimore, MD: Gateway Press, 1991.
- Ross, Sam. The Empty Sleeve: A Biography of Lucius Fairchild. Madison, WI: State Historical Society of Wisconsin, 1964.

== Notes ==
Party political offices
Preceded by James T. Lewis	Republican nominee for Governor of Wisconsin; 1865, 1867, 1869	Succeeded by Cadwallader C. Washburn
Political offices
Preceded by James T. Lewis	Secretary of State of Wisconsin; 1864 – 1866	Succeeded by Thomas Allen
Preceded by James T. Lewis	Governor of Wisconsin; 1866 – 1872	Succeeded by Cadwallader C. Washburn
Diplomatic posts
Preceded by James Russell Lowell	United States Minister to Spain; 1880 – 1881	Succeeded by Hannibal Hamlin
