= Edwin Knappe =

American politician

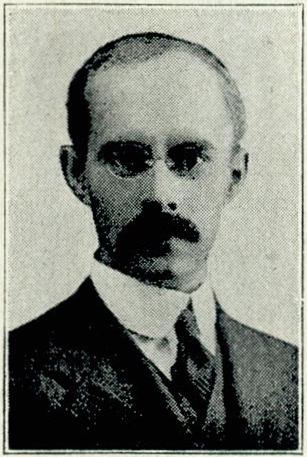
Knappe's official State Assembly portrait, 1919

Edwin William Knappe (January 14, 1884 – February 5, 1971) was an American machinist from Milwaukee who became a lawyer, and who served one term as a Socialist member of the Wisconsin State Assembly.

== Background ==
Knappe was born in Milwaukee on January 14, 1884, son of Herman William Knappe and Anna Miller Knappe. He attended Milwaukee's public schools, including one year at West Division High School. He left school at the age of 15 and became a journeyman machinist. In 1905, about the time he joined the Socialist Party, he left Milwaukee and worked his way around the world, spending several months in Australia, where he worked as a machinist. After returning to Milwaukee, he completed his secondary education in night school. He ran unsuccessfully for the Milwaukee County Board of Supervisors in 1908; served as deputy clerk of the circuit court from 1911 to 1913, and ran for the Assembly in 1912, losing to Republican alderman August Dietrich. Having spent three years in the Evening Law School of Marquette University, he passed his bar examination in 1913. He practiced law as a member of the firm of Kleist, Harriman & Knappe, and served as Milwaukee election commissioner from 1915 to 1918. He remained a member of the Machinists Union (Lodge #66) and served as attorney for District 10 of that union.

A collection of Knappe's personal and professional papers resides at Milwaukee Public Library.

== Public office ==
He was elected to the Assembly in 1918 to succeed fellow Socialist and lawyer Glenn P. Turner (who like Knappe was a member of Kleist, Harriman & Knappe) in representing the Tenth Milwaukee County Assembly District (the 21st and 25th Wards of the City of Milwaukee). He received 3,959 votes to 1,211 for Democrat Theo. Thielges; and was appointed to the standing committee on state affairs.

He did not run for re-election in 1920, and was succeeded by fellow Socialist Fred Hasley (who was elected without opposition).

== After the Assembly ==
In 1928 he was the Socialist candidate for Milwaukee County district attorney, coming in third with 19.43% of the vote. In 1930, he was one of the Socialist nominees in the nominally non-partisan Milwaukee Board of School Directors election In 1932 he was appointed as an assistant city attorney for the City of Milwaukee under Socialist city attorney Max Raskin but lost that position when Raskin was defeated in 1936.

In 1941, Knappe succeeded Frank Zeidler as secretary of the Wisconsin and Milwaukee County Socialist party branches. In 1942 he was the Socialist nominee for Wisconsin's 5th congressional district (Victor Berger's old seat), coming in 4th in a race which saw incumbent Republican Lewis D. Thill unseated by Democrat Howard J. McMurray.

In 1944 Knappe was himself a candidate for city attorney against Walter J. Mattison, the candidate who had defeated Raskin. He asserted that privately owned public utilities had created a $5 million slush fund to defeat Socialists such as Raskin and himself. He was again the Socialist nominee for Congress, coming in third in a four-way race which was won by former Socialist-turned-Democrat Andrew Biemiller. In 1946, Knappe was the Socialist candidate for the United States Senate, coming in third of four candidates in a race in which Joseph McCarthy, who had already ousted Robert M. La Follette in the Republican primary, won the Senate seat against Democrat McMurray, Knappe, and an Independent Socialist Labor candidate. He was again the Socialist nominee for Congress in the 5th District in 1948, losing again to Biemiller (who had lost his seat in 1946 to Republican Charles J. Kersten; Biemiller polled 91,072 votes; Kersten 76,782; and Knappe 3,651). In 1950 he once again was the Socialist candidate for the Senate, coming in third to Republican incumbent Alexander Wiley and Democrat Thomas E. Fairchild.

== Personal life ==
He was a member and officer of the Milwaukee Turners. As of 1946, he was married and had two children, Herman and Henrietta, by a previous marriage to Ella Kleist.
