= George Hampel (politician) =

American politician (1885–1954)

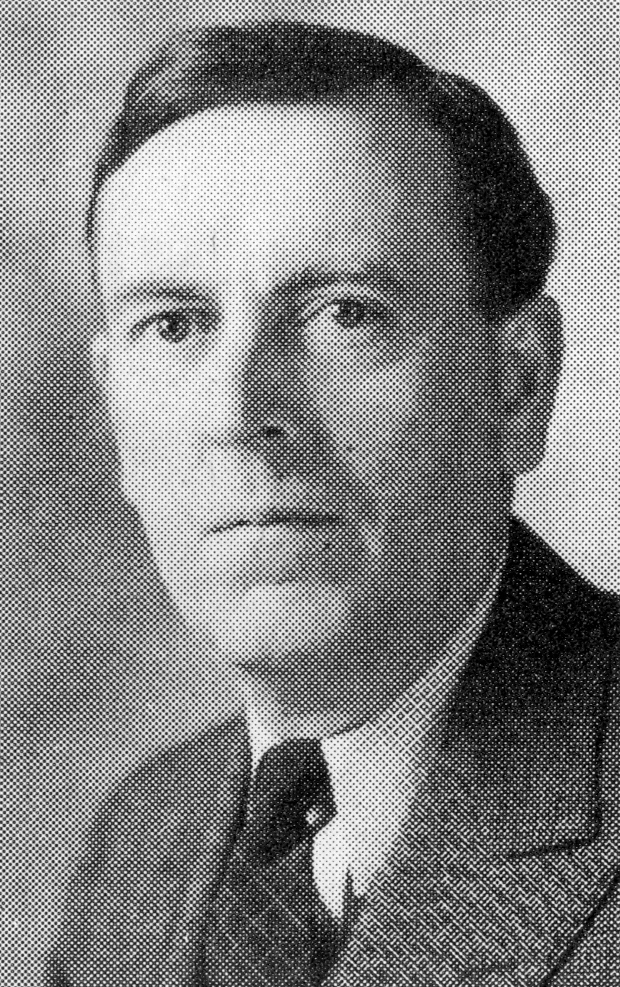

Member of the Wisconsin Senate from the 6th district
- In office January 4, 1937 – January 1, 1945
- Preceded by: Charles H. Phillips
- Succeeded by: Edward W. Reuther

Member of the Wisconsin State Assembly from the Milwaukee 3rd district
- In office January 5, 1931 – January 2, 1933
- Preceded by: Albert F. Woller
- Succeeded by: Arthur J. Balzer

Personal details
- Born: August 27, 1885 Milwaukee, Wisconsin
- Died: May 15, 1954 (aged 68) Milwaukee, Wisconsin
- Party: Republican (After 1946); Progressive (1936–1946); Socialist (Before 1936)
- Spouse: Louise
- Profession: Accountant, bookseller, politician

George F. L. Hampel Sr. (August 27, 1885 – May 15, 1954) was an American politician, accountant and bookseller from Milwaukee who served one term in the Wisconsin State Assembly as a Socialist (1931–1932) and two terms in the Wisconsin State Senate as a Progressive (1937–1944). Hampel at various times identified himself as a Social Democrat/Socialist, and Progressive; and joined the Republicans when the Progressives rejoined the latter party.

== Background ==
Hampel was born in Milwaukee in 1885. He was educated at West Division High School, part of the Milwaukee Public Schools, and also took classes at the International Correspondence Schools and Hesse's Art School. Hampel was an accountant and president of Hampel's Book Shop, Inc.

== Political career ==
He began his political career in 1916 by running unsuccessfully for State Treasurer of Wisconsin as a Social Democrat, as they were called in Wisconsin, receiving only 31,329 votes to Republican Merlin Hull's 232,171. In 1916 he was appointed to the Milwaukee Motion Picture Commission, a film censorship body; he would remain on the commission until 1940. Hampel was soon elected as county clerk of Milwaukee County, serving from 1919 to 1920 While serving as clerk, Hampel testified and wrote an affidavit in support of fellow Wisconsin socialist Victor Berger for the Congressman's House hearings regarding whether he should be seated. In 1920, he was a delegate to the Convention of the Socialist Party of America.

After ten years away from elected office, Hampel won election as a Socialist to the Wisconsin State Assembly representing Milwaukee County's third Assembly district in 1930, winning 2994 votes versus Republican Frank G. Pope's 2,058, and Democrat John H. Stemper's 545. Two years later he ran for the Wisconsin State Senate's Sixth District seat, but lost to Democrat Charles H. Phillips. Phillips received 14,885 votes; Hampel 13,951; Republican George W. Becker 3,433; and former Republican Assemblyman (running as an independent) Martin M. Higgins 267 Hampel was successful when he ran again for the seat in 1936, this time running as a Progressive. He was reelected as a Progressive in 1940. Although Hampel had been a member of both the Socialist Party of America and the Wisconsin Progressive Party, he left the Socialists in 1941 after that party ordered its members to quit the Progressive Party. He served as a vice chairman and Milwaukee County chairman of the state Progressive Party in the early 1940s. He failed to keep his state senate seat when he ran without any party affiliation in 1944, losing to Democrat Edward W. Reuther. Reuther received 22,163 votes; Republican Arthur H. Schroeder 17,272; Hampel 4,222; and Socialist former Assemblyman and Senator Alex C. Ruffing 3,112 votes.

When the Wisconsin Progressive Party no longer remained a viable third party after the 1944 elections, Hampel and his son argued against joining the Democrats and instead favored rejoining the Republican Party of Wisconsin. Hampel then helped to lead the Progressives back into the Republican Party fold after the declining party voted in favor of such a merger on March 17, 1946.

== Personal life ==
In later years, Hampel worked as manager of the Cedar Creek Distillery in Cedarburg, Wisconsin.

Hampel was married to Louise Hampel. They had three children: Ruth, Gordon and George Jr., the latter of whom served as a member of the Milwaukee Board of Trustees. He died in Milwaukee in 1954, and was buried in Wanderer's Rest Cemetery.
