= Thomas H. Brown (mayor) =

19th century American politician

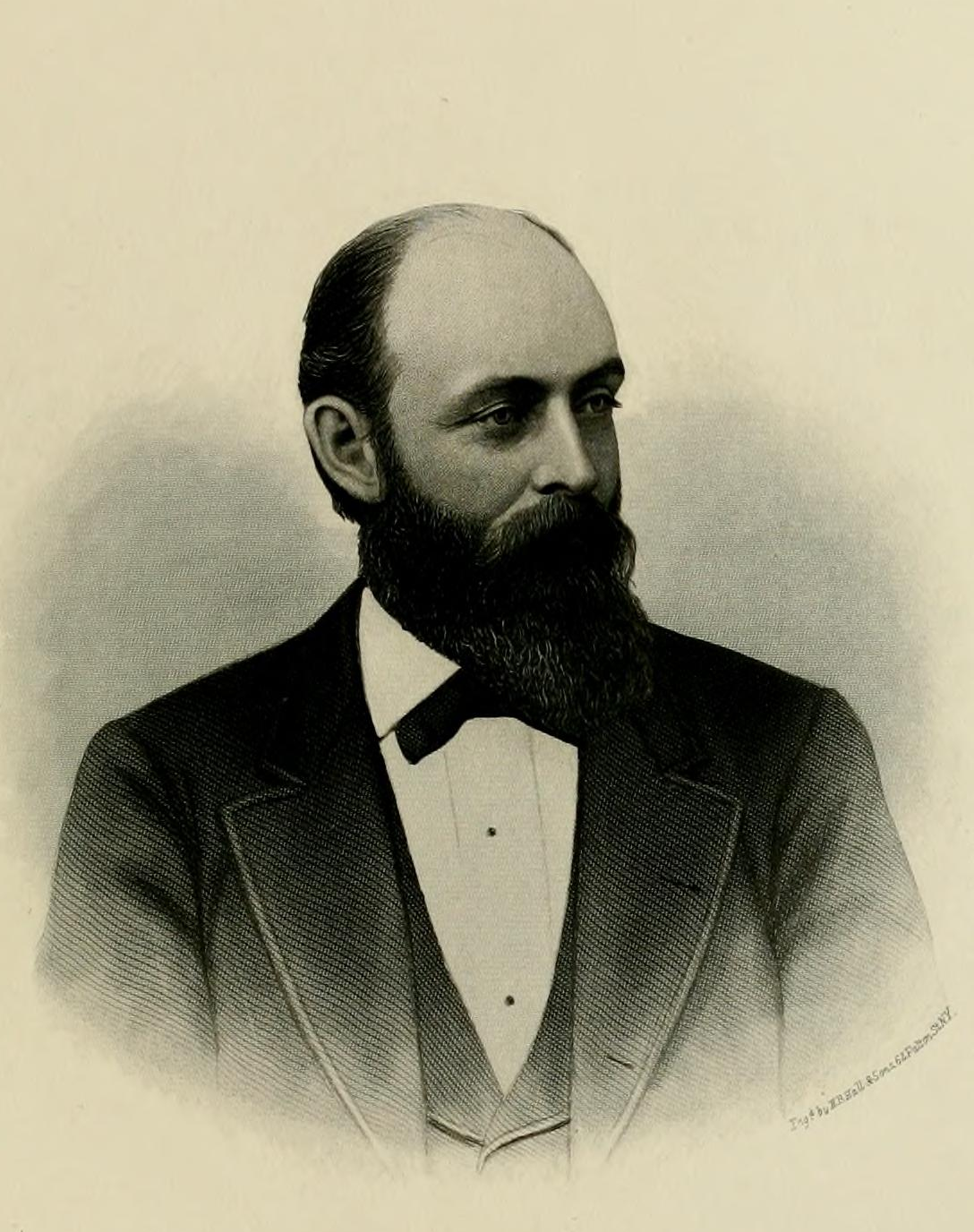
- Portrait from the United States biographical dictionary and portrait gallery of eminent and self-made men; Wisconsin volume (1877)

25th & 28th Mayor of Milwaukee
- In office April 1888 – April 1890
- Preceded by: Emil Wallber
- Succeeded by: George Wilbur Peck
- In office April 1880 – April 1882
- Preceded by: John Black
- Succeeded by: John M. Stowell

Personal details
- Born: April 3, 1839 Milwaukee, Wisconsin Territory, U.S.
- Died: June 19, 1908 (aged 69) Milwaukee, Wisconsin, U.S.
- Resting place: Forest Home Cemetery, Milwaukee, Wisconsin
- Party: Republican
- Spouses: Emilie J. Fowler (m. 1866; died 1868); Alice Louisa Davis (m. 1872–1908)
- Children: Fanny D. (Merkel)^{(b. 1874; died 1949)}; Edith Brown
- Parent: Samuel Brown (father)
- Education: Beloit College

Thomas Hoyt Brown (April 3, 1839 – June 19, 1908) was an American businessman and Republican politician. He was the 25th and 28th mayor of Milwaukee, Wisconsin, and was the first mayor of Milwaukee born in Milwaukee.

== Background ==
Thomas H. Brown was born in Milwaukee on April 3, 1839. He died at his home in Milwaukee on June 19, 1908.

== Career ==
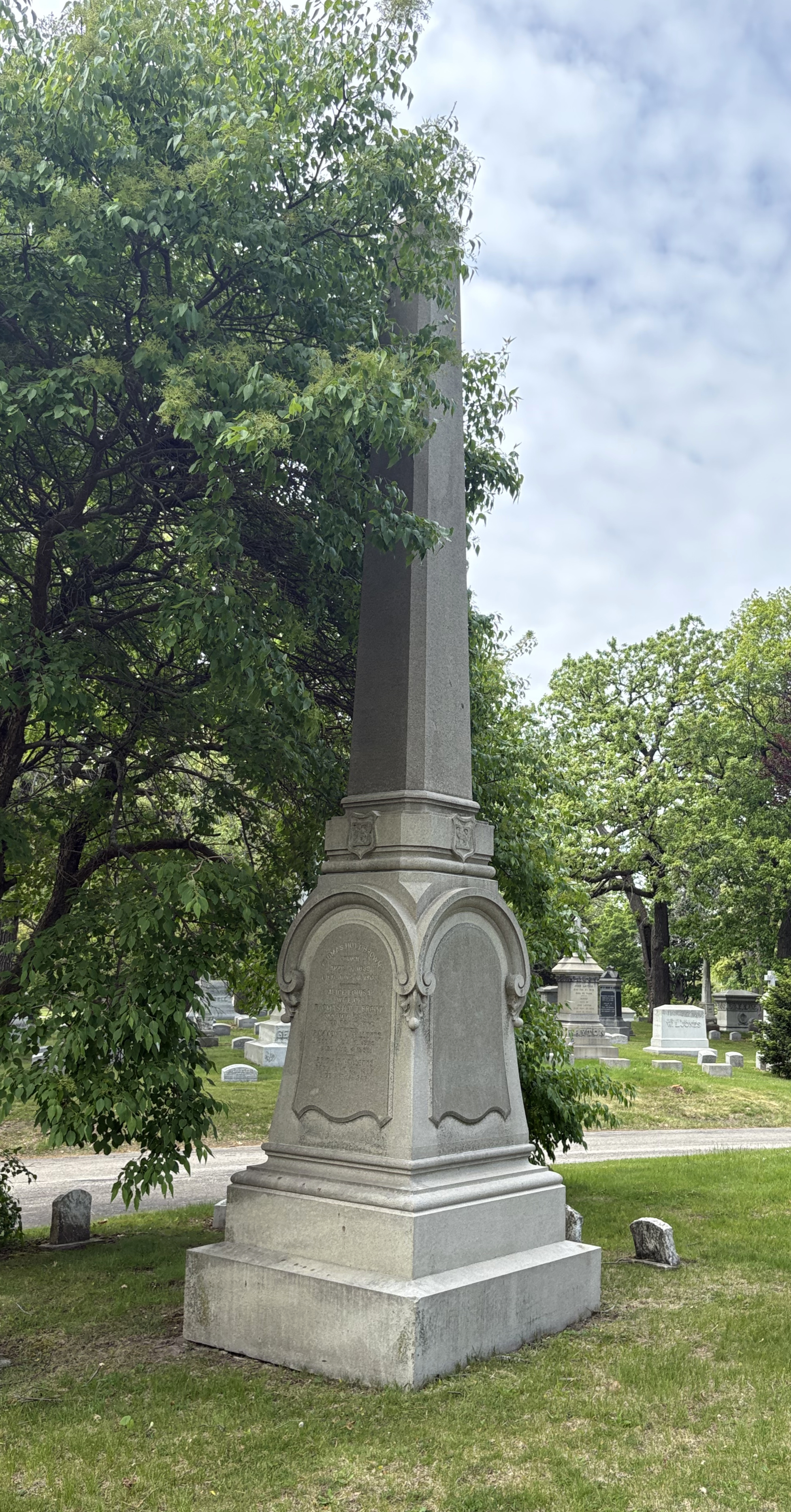
Brown's grave at Forest Home Cemetery

Brown served as an alderman and President of the Milwaukee Common Council before serving as Mayor from 1880 to 1882.

In 1888, merchant and former alderman Herman Kroeger ran for Mayor of Milwaukee as a Union Labor candidate advocating public ownership of municipal improvements, the establishment of public baths and a law permitting the recall of city officials. He was taken so seriously that the Republicans and Democrats united to run Brown as a fusion candidate against him. He was nearly elected anyway, with 15,033 votes to 15,978 for Brown. Radical Socialist Labor candidate Colin Campbell, backed by Paul Grottkau (imprisoned editor of the Arbeiter Zeitung) garnered 964 votes, just enough to keep Kroeger from winning if they’d gone to him instead.

Brown was a Republican. He is interred in Forest Home Cemetery in Milwaukee.

Political offices
Preceded by John Black	Mayor of Milwaukee, Wisconsin; April 1880 – April 1882	Succeeded by John M. Stowell
Preceded by Emil Wallber	Mayor of Milwaukee, Wisconsin; April 1888 – April 1890	Succeeded by George Wilbur Peck
