= Alex C. Ruffing =

American politician (1892–1958)

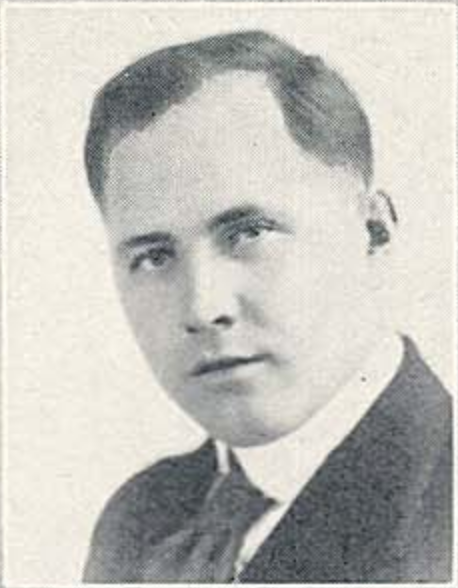
Alex Ruffing, machinist and Socialist politician

Alex C. Ruffing (November 2, 1892 – September 6, 1958) was an American machinist and Socialist from Milwaukee who served four terms (1919–1926) as a member of the Wisconsin State Assembly and one shortened term in Wisconsin State Senate representing Milwaukee County-based districts

== Background ==
Ruffing was born in Milwaukee on November 2, 1892. He was educated in the public and parochial schools and learned the machinist trade at the Allis-Chalmers plant.

== Legislative career ==
He had never entered electoral politics before a 1916 run for the Assembly from the 7th Milwaukee County district (7th and 10th wards of the City of Milwaukee), which he lost to Republican Bernhard Gettelman by 85 votes. In 1918 Ruffing was elected to the same Assembly seat at the age of 26 years and three days, receiving 2,959 votes to 1,410 for Republican Tony Rausch (Gettelman had become chief deputy sheriff of Milwaukee County). He became the youngest member of the fifty-fourth session of the legislature, and was assigned to the standing committee on public welfare. He continued to work at the factory between sessions at first, but from 1923 to 1928 worked as an annexation solicitor for the City of Milwaukee.

He was re-elected in 1920 and 1922 without opposition, switching to the Committees on the Judiciary and then Finance, and in 1924 won re-election by 2367 votes to 1622 for Henry A. Zaidina.

In November 1926, Ruffing was elected to the State Senate to fill out the unexpired term of fellow Socialist Joseph Padway (who had resigned to serve as judge of the Milwaukee civil court), with 4297 votes for Ruffing to 3294 for Republican Otto Tetzloff. He was assigned to the joint committee on Finance, on which he'd served two terms while in the Assembly. He was appointed as a Milwaukee alderman by Socialist mayor Dan Hoan in 1928, and was succeeded in the Senate by fellow Socialist Thomas Duncan.

== Post-legislature ==
Ruffing continued to serve as an alderman until defeated for re-election on April 4, 1944, by Republican State Representative Martin E. Schreiber. He was now a vice-chairman of the Wisconsin Socialist Party central committee, and became the Socialist candidate for state senate against incumbent (and former Socialist) George Hampel, who ran without any party affiliation; with both of them losing in November to Democrat Edward W. Reuther. In 1946, he ran for his old seat in the Assembly, coming in third to Republican Clyde Follansbee and Democrat John Schaller. In 1949, he returned to his old employment as an annexation solicitor under new Socialist mayor Frank P. Zeidler; and in June 1950 he was elected to succeed Zeidler as state chairman of the Socialist Party.

He died on September 6, 1958, in Milwaukee, a fact memorialized by an Assembly joint resolution in 2005.
