= Fred Hasley =

American politician

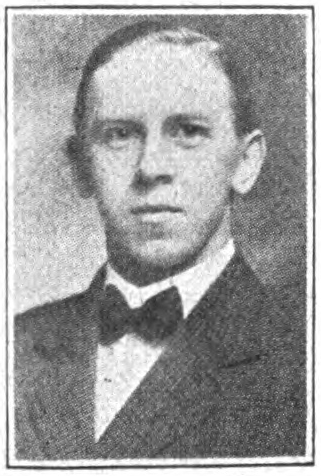
Hasley's official State Assembly portrait, 1921

Fred J. Hasley (December 5, 1884 – April 4, 1939) was an American typesetter from Milwaukee who served one term as a Socialist member of the Wisconsin State Assembly.

== Background ==
Hasley was born in Milwaukee on December 5, 1884 and was educated in the Milwaukee Public Schools, graduating in 1900, and going into the printer's trade. He became a member of the Typographical Union Local 23 in 1904. He had never held a public office of any kind until being elected to the Assembly in 1920, although he had held offices in his union.

== Public office ==
He was elected to the Assembly in 1920 to succeed fellow Socialist Edwin Knappe in representing the Tenth Milwaukee County Assembly District (the 21st and 25th Wards of the City of Milwaukee). He ran unopposed (one of three Socialists in Milwaukee to do so that year), receiving 6,918 votes to 3 for other persons; and was appointed to the standing committee on labor.

He did not run for re-election in 1922 after a redistricting split his district into the new Fourth and Third Milwaukee County Districts; and was succeeded by fellow Socialists Frank J. Weber and Thomas M. Duncan, both of whom were elected without opposition.

== Death ==
Hasley killed himself in Milwaukee County one half mile north of Silver Springs Road by leaping in front of an interurban electric street car and his body was dragged 45 feet. Hasley's sister said he was depressed about losing his job as a proofreader of a Milwaukee newspaper that went out of business a few months before.
