= Edward Reuther =

American politician (1915–2002)

Edward W. Reuther (March 30, 1915 – April 30, 2002) was an American politician who served one term as a Democratic member of the Wisconsin State Senate for the 6th District.

== Background ==
Reuther was born in Milwaukee on March 30, 1915, son of Edward A. and Johanna A. (Hoerl) Reuther. He attended parochial schools, graduating from Messmer High School, and became an employee of the Veteran's Administration and later a glass fitter.

== Legislature ==
Reuther unseated Progressive incumbent George Hampel in 1944, with 22,163 votes to 17,272 for Republican Arthur H. Schroeder; 4,222 for Hampel, and 3,112 for Socialist former Senator and Assemblyman Alex C. Ruffing. He was assigned to the standing committee on education and public welfare.

By the time of publication of the 1948 Wisconsin Blue Book, his official biography states that he had gone into an "occupation in the advertising business"; his committee assignment had not changed. In 1948's Democratic primary election, he lost the nomination by 22 votes to former Progressive William A. Schmidt, who would win the general election.

== After the Senate ==
Reuther married Madeline Glodoski from Amherst Junction, Wisconsin on Sept. 26, 1953, in Fancher, Wisconsin. He worked for the Milwaukee Braves, and eventually retired from a position with the Milwaukee treasurer's office. He died Tuesday, April 30, 2002, at his residence in Milwaukee County. Survivors included his wife; one daughter, Mary Beth Tennessen; one sister, Victoria Giese; and one granddaughter.
