= Joseph Klein (composer) =

American composer

Joseph Klein (born 1962 in Los Angeles, California) is an American composer, conductor, and educator. He has taught at the University of North Texas College of Music since 1992, where he is currently Distinguished Teaching Professor and Chair of Composition Studies.

Klein's work has been recognized by the National Endowment for the Arts, the American Music Center, the American Composers Forum, the Gaudeamus Foundation, Meet the Composer, the International Society for Contemporary Music, and the American Society of Composers, Authors, and Publishers. He has collaborated with the International Contemporary Ensemble, Pittsburgh New Music Ensemble, Locrian Chamber Players, Voices of Change, Orchestra 2001, and numerous solo artists including vocalist Joan La Barbara, flutist Helen Bledsoe, cellist Madeleine Shapiro, and glass harmonica player Thomas Bloch.

== Education ==
Klein studied microbiology and music composition at California State Polytechnic University, Pomona, where he received a B.A. in Music in 1984. He subsequently studied composition with Robert Erickson and Roger Reynolds at the University of California, San Diego (M.A. in Music Composition, 1986), and with Harvey Sollberger and Claude Baker at Indiana University Jacobs School of Music, where he received a D.Mus. in Composition in 1991, with minors in music theory and art history.

== Music ==
Klein's creative output comprises solo, chamber, and large ensemble works, including instrumental, vocal, electroacoustic, and intermedia compositions. His music reflects an ongoing interest in processes drawn from sources such as fractal geometry, chaos theory, and systems theory, often inspired by natural phenomena. Klein frequently incorporates theatrical elements in his work, either as an extra-musical feature or as an organic extension of the musical narrative. Recent works, most notably the cycle of nineteen works collectively titled An Unaware Cosmos (2012-2018), explore modular, recombinant, and non-linear formal paradigms.

Literary influences include Franz Kafka, Elias Canetti, Alice Fulton, W.S. Merwin, Milan Kundera, and Christina Rossetti. In particular, Canetti's writings Earwitness (Der Ohrenzeuge, 1974) and Crowds and Power (Masse und Macht, 1960) have inspired over twenty solo instrumental and open-form chamber works composed since 1997.

Musical influences include Edgard Varèse, György Ligeti, Olivier Messiaen, and Morton Feldman. He also specializes in the music of Frank Zappa, and has taught courses, organized performances, given interviews, and presented lectures on Zappa's life and work.

== Selected works ==
Large ensemble works

- March Transforms — a deconstruction of Sousa's "Stars and Stripes Forever" for wind ensemble (1986; rev. 1993)
- Pathways: Opposing Forces for solo trombone and chamber orchestra (1993)
- Pathways: Revolution for solo percussion and chamber orchestra (1993/95)
- Pathways: Interior Shadows for solo soprano saxophone and chamber orchestra (1993/95)
- the road in its unfoldings meta-passacaglia for wind symphony (1996-97)
- Zwei Parabeln nach Franz Kafka for narrator, mixed choir, and computer music (2006)

Chamber music

- IcarUS At thE caBARet VoLtairE: parT I (tHe RENdeZVOus) for two guitarists (1985)
- Parallaxes for four trombones (1988)
- Occam's Razor seven studies for ten players (1994/99)
- Interstices for flute/piccolo, soprano/tenor saxophone, and percussion (2013-14)
- An Unaware Cosmos modular work for multiple soloists and chamber ensembles (2012-18)
- Canetti-menagerie open-form work after Elias Canetti, for 5 to 8 players (2015)
- Recombinant for clarinet, violin, and piano (2019)

Solo works

- Der Leichenschleicher for solo contrabass (1997)
- Die Tischtuchtolle for solo violin (1997)
- Die Silbenreine for solo glass harmonica (2000)
- Der Ohrenzeuge for solo bass flute (2001)
- Die Königskünderin for solo trumpet (2006)
- Die Sternklare for solo percussion (2006)
- Der Schönheitsmolch for solo bass saxophone (2008)
- Der Hinterbringer for solo piccolo (2013)
- Der Gottprotz for solo organ (2014)
- Die Schadhafte for solo violoncello (2015)
- Der Saus und Braus for solo piano (2017)
- Chain of Circumstances modular work for solo piano or piano four hands with optional live electronics (2020)

Electronic and intermedia works

- Goblin Market for trombonist, pianist, and intermedia environment (1993)
- Dog (after W.S. Merwin) for female voice, bassoon, and intermedia (1997)
- Leviathan (after W.S. Merwin) for male voice, bass trombone, and intermedia (1998)
- Three Poems from Felt (after Alice Fulton) — poetry reading with computer music (2005)
- Cornell Set — poetry reading with computer music (2011)

== Selected discography ==
- Pathways: New Music for Trombone, Mark MCD-2645 (1998); Andrew Glendening, trombone.
- CEMISonics: The Threshold of Sound, Centaur CRC-2407, Consortium to Distribute Computer Music, Vol. 27 (1998).
- Equipoise: Music of Joseph Klein and William Kleinsasser, Innova 611 (2005).
- Facets 3: New American Music for Trumpet, Mark MCD-2645 (May 2009); John Holt, trumpet.
- Music from the University of North Texas Center for Experimental Music and Intermedia, Centaur CRC-3219, Consortium to Distribute Computer Music, Volume 39 (2012).
- Improbable Encounters: Music of Joseph Klein, Innova 873 (2014).
