= Martin M. Higgins =

American politician

Martin M. Higgins (January 5, 1891 – May 27, 1950) was an American advertising man who spent one term as a Republican member of the Wisconsin State Assembly from Milwaukee, Wisconsin, and later served as a Milwaukee alderman.

== Background ==
Higgins was born in Chicago on January 5, 1891, was educated in public and parochial schools and business college. He served in the United States Navy during the First World War, was honorably discharged, and went into what his official biography describes as "the advertising business, specializing in periodical magazine work." He never held public office until elected to the Assembly.

== Legislative term ==
In 1920, Higgins defeated incumbent Socialist Joseph Klein with 2,185 votes for Higgins to 1,206 for Klein (there was no Democrat in the race) to represent the Assembly's Second Milwaukee County district (the 2nd Ward of the City of Milwaukee). He was assigned to the standing committee on elections.

In 1922, after his Assembly district had been somewhat altered by redistricting, he ran unsuccessfully as an Independent Republican for the State Senate's 9th District, coming in fourth in a four-way race. (The altered 2nd Assembly District seat was taken by Republican Michael Laffey.)

== Milwaukee alderman ==
In 1928, Higgins was elected to the Milwaukee Common Council as Alderman from the 2nd Ward. Instead of running for reelection as alderman, he ran in 1932 for the State Senate (for the 6th District this time) as an independent, and again came in fourth in a four-way race. In 1936 he was again elected alderman for the 2nd Ward. He was defeated in 1940, and repeatedly sought to return to his old office. He became a perennial candidate for city, county and state offices, and ran at various times as a Republican or Democrat. He worked as a plant guard, and died of a heart attack on May 27, 1950, having lost his most recent race for alderman the month before. He was survived by a wife Alma, three daughters and a son.
