= List of mayors of Milwaukee =

This is a list of mayors of Milwaukee, Wisconsin. Following the election of Social-Democrat Emil Seidel as mayor of Milwaukee in 1910, Wisconsin legislators passed a bill in 1912 to declare most local offices across the state as officially non-partisan.

== List ==
No.	Portrait	Mayor	Party	Sworn in	Left office	Comments
1		Solomon Juneau (1793–1856)	Democrat	1846	1846	
2		Horatio Wells (1808–1858)	Democrat	1847	1847	
3		Byron Kilbourn (1801–1870)	Democrat	1848	1848	
4		Don A. J. Upham (1809–1877)	Democrat	1849	1850	
5		George H. Walker (1811–1866)	Democrat	1851	1851	
6		Hans Crocker (1815–1889)	Democrat	1852	1852	
7		George H. Walker (1811–1866)	Democrat	1853	1853	His second, nonconsecutive term
8		Byron Kilbourn (1801–1870)	Democrat	1854	1854	His second, nonconsecutive term
9		James B. Cross (1819–1876)	Democrat	1855	1857	
10		William A. Prentiss (1799–1892)	Republican	1858	1859	
11		Herman L. Page (1818–1873)	Democrat	1859	1859	
12		William Pitt Lynde (1817–1885)	Democrat	1860	1860	
13		James S. Brown (1824–1878)	Democrat	1861	1861	Elected without opposition. Did not run for re-election.
14		Horace Chase (1810–1886)	Democrat	1862	1862	
15		Edward O'Neill (1820–1890)	Democrat	1863	1863	
16		Abner Kirby (1818–1893)	Democrat	1864	1864	
17		John J. Tallmadge (1818–1873)	Democrat	1865	1866	
18		Edward O'Neill (1820–1890)	Democrat	1867	1870	His second, nonconsecutive term
19		Joseph Phillips (1825–1906)	Democrat	1870	1871	
20		Harrison Ludington (1812–1891)	Republican	1871	1872	
21		David G. Hooker (1830–1888)	Democrat	1872	1873	
22		Harrison Ludington (1812–1891)	Republican	1873	1876	His second, nonconsecutive term
23		Ammi R. R. Butler (1821–1901)	Democrat	1876	1878	
24		John Black (1830–1899)	Democrat	1878	1880	
25		Thomas H. Brown (1839–1908)	Republican	1880	1882	
26		John M. Stowell (1824–1907)	Democrat	1882	1884	
27		Emil Wallber (1841–1923)	Republican	1884	1888	
28		Thomas H. Brown (1839–1908)	Republican	1888	1890	His second, nonconsecutive term
29		George W. Peck (1840–1916)	Democrat	1890	November 11, 1890	Resigned to become Governor of Wisconsin
30		Peter J. Somers (1850–1924)	Democrat	December 6, 1890	June 5, 1893	Resigned after being elected to the House of Representatives
–		Henry Hase (1847–1929)		June 5, 1893	July 1, 1893	Acting Mayor
31		John C. Koch (1841–1907)	Republican	1893	1896	
32		William C. Rauschenberger (1855–1918)	Republican	1896	1898	
33		David S. Rose (1856–1932)	Democrat	1898	1906	
34		Sherburn M. Becker (1876–1949)	Republican	1906	1908	
35		David S. Rose (1856–1932)	Democrat	1908	1910	His second, nonconsecutive term
36		Emil Seidel (1864–1947)	Social-Democratic	1910	1912	
37		Gerhard A. Bading (1870–1946)	Fusion	1912	1916	
38		Daniel Hoan (1881–1961)	Social-Democratic	1916	April 16, 1940	
39		Carl Zeidler (1908–1942)	Democrat	April 16, 1940	April 8, 1942	Resigned to fight in World War II, in which he was killed
40		John Bohn (1872–1955)	Nonpartisan	April 8, 1942	April 20, 1948	Interim mayor until being officially elected in 1944
41		Frank Zeidler (1912–2006)	Social-Democratic	April 20, 1948	April 19, 1960	
42		Henry Maier (1918–1994)	Democrat	April 19, 1960	April 19, 1988	
43		John Norquist (born 1949)	Democrat	April 18, 1988	January 1, 2004	Resigned to head the Congress for the New Urbanism
		Marvin Pratt (born 1944)	Democrat	January 1, 2004	April 20, 2004	Acting mayor, first African American mayor of Milwaukee
44		Tom Barrett (born 1953)	Democrat	April 20, 2004	December 22, 2021	Resigned to become U.S. Ambassador to Luxembourg
45		Cavalier Johnson (born 1986)	Democrat	December 22, 2021	present	First elected African American mayor of Milwaukee
