= Edward O'Neill (Wisconsin politician) =

American politician

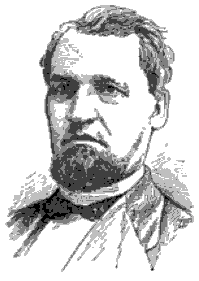

Mayor of Milwaukee
- In office 1863, 1867–1870

Member of the Wisconsin State Senate
- In office 1856–1857
- Constituency: Sixth District

Member of the Wisconsin State Assembly
- In office 1854–1855

Personal details
- Born: March 14, 1820 Killarney, Ireland
- Died: March 28, 1890 (aged 70) Milwaukee, Wisconsin
- Party: Democratic
- Spouse: Clarissa A. McLaughlin (m. 1847; died 1890)
- Children: 1
- Occupation: Businessman, politician

Edward O'Neill (March 14, 1820 – March 28, 1890) was an American merchant, banker and politician, who served in the Wisconsin State Senate and the State Assembly; and four one-year terms as Mayor of Milwaukee, Wisconsin, as well as nine years on the Milwaukee Board of School Directors, four of them as its president. He was a Democrat.

== Background ==
O'Neill was born March 14, 1820, in Killarney, Ireland, and was educated in the parochial schools. He came to the United States at the age of 17 and settled in Manchester, Vermont, where he remained for some time. In 1847 he married Clarissa A. McLaughlin of Arlington, Vermont. The O'Neills moved in October 1850 to Milwaukee. In 1852 O'Neill helped to organize the Milwaukee Union Guard, of which he was elected captain and remained in that office until elected lieutenant-colonel of the First Regiment of the Wisconsin State Militia.

== In the legislature ==
He served two one-year terms (1854–1855) in the Assembly and was elected to the State Senate's Sixth District in 1855 for the 1856–1857 sessions. He was particularly proud of his role in establishing the House of Refuge for Juvenile Delinquents (later renamed the State Reform School, then the Industrial School for Boys), a state reform school in Waukesha. He would serve as president of its board of managers for ten years, and was repeatedly reappointed by Republican governors on account of his interest in the school.

== 1860s and beyond ==
In 1860, he partnered with John Dahlman and Timothy Dore in opening a large wholesale grocery business, which they continued for ten years.

In 1863 he was elected mayor of Milwaukee. He was elected once more in 1867 and re-elected in 1868 and 1869. In his first and last races, he was unopposed.

In 1870, he was one of the businessmen who organized the Bank of Commerce, of which he became president; when the Bank of Commerce and the German Exchange Bank merged to form the Merchants' Exchange Bank, he remained its president until his death in 1890.

After the city appropriated a million dollars to build an extensive waterworks, O'Neill was appointed president of the city's board of water commissioners until control of the works was transferred in 1875 to the control of the city engineer and board of public works.

== Deaths ==
Clarissa O'Neill died January 23, 1890, and Edward followed her in death on March 28 of that year. They left a large sum to the St. Rose Catholic girl's orphanage which O'Neill had helped found, and of which he had been a trustee; and the remainder of their wealth to their daughter, Marie (O'Neill) Keefe.
