= Casper Sanger =

American politician

Casper M. Sanger (August 16, 1836 – August 22, 1897) was an American businessman and politician.

Born in Westphalia, Prussia, Sanger emigrated with his family to the United States in 1840 and settled in Detroit, Michigan. Sanger learned the tanning business and, in 1862, moved to Milwaukee, Wisconsin. He continued to work in the tanning business and owned a shoe store. He then was involved with the window, blind, and sash business. Sanger also owned a harness and saddle business. Sanger served on the Milwaukee Common Council and was a Republican. In 1873, Sanger served in the Wisconsin State Assembly. In 1876, Sanger was elected sheriff of Milwaukee County and was the first Republican to serve as sheriff of Milwaukee, Wisconsin. In 1893, Sanger and his family moved to California as a result of financial problems because of the Panic of 1893. Sanger and family moved back to Milwaukee in 1896. Sanger died at his home in Milwaukee, Wisconsin as a result of a stroke.
