= Wisconsin's 6th Senate district =

American legislative district for Milwaukee, Wisconsin

Wisconsin's 6th State Senate district
- 2024 map defined in 2023 Wisc. Act 94; 2022 map defined in Johnson v. Wisconsin Elections Commission; 2011 map was defined in 2011 Wisc. Act 43 composed of Assembly districts 16, 17, and 18
Senator
| La Tonya Johnson; D–Milwaukee |
since January 3, 2017 (9 years, 124 days)
- Demographics: 32.4% White; 56.13% Black; 5.97% Hispanic; 4.99% Asian; 1.66% Native American; 0.15% Hawaiian/Pacific Islander
- Population (2020) • Voting age: 178,495; 150,001
- Website: Official website
- Notes: North side of Milwaukee

The 6th Senate district of Wisconsin is one of 33 districts in the Wisconsin Senate. Located in southeast Wisconsin, the district is entirely contained within central Milwaukee County. It includes parts of north, west, and downtown Milwaukee, and part of eastern Wauwatosa. It contains landmarks such as the Marquette University campus, Fiserv Forum (home of the Milwaukee Bucks), the Milwaukee Public Museum, historic Holy Cross Cemetery, and the Miller Brewing Company. The 6th Senate district is one of two majority-black Senate districts in Wisconsin.

== Current elected officials ==
La Tonya Johnson is the senator representing the 6th district. Now in her second term, she was first elected in the 2016 general election, after the previous senator, Nikiya Harris Dodd, declined to seek re-election.

Each Wisconsin State Senate district is composed of three State Assembly districts. The 6th Senate district comprises the 16th, 17th, and 18th Assembly districts. The current representatives of those districts are:

- Assembly District 16: Kalan Haywood (D–Milwaukee)
- Assembly District 17: Supreme Moore Omokunde (D–Milwaukee)
- Assembly District 18: Margaret Arney (D–Wauwatosa)

The district is located entirely within Wisconsin's 4th congressional district, which is represented by U.S. Representative Gwen Moore.

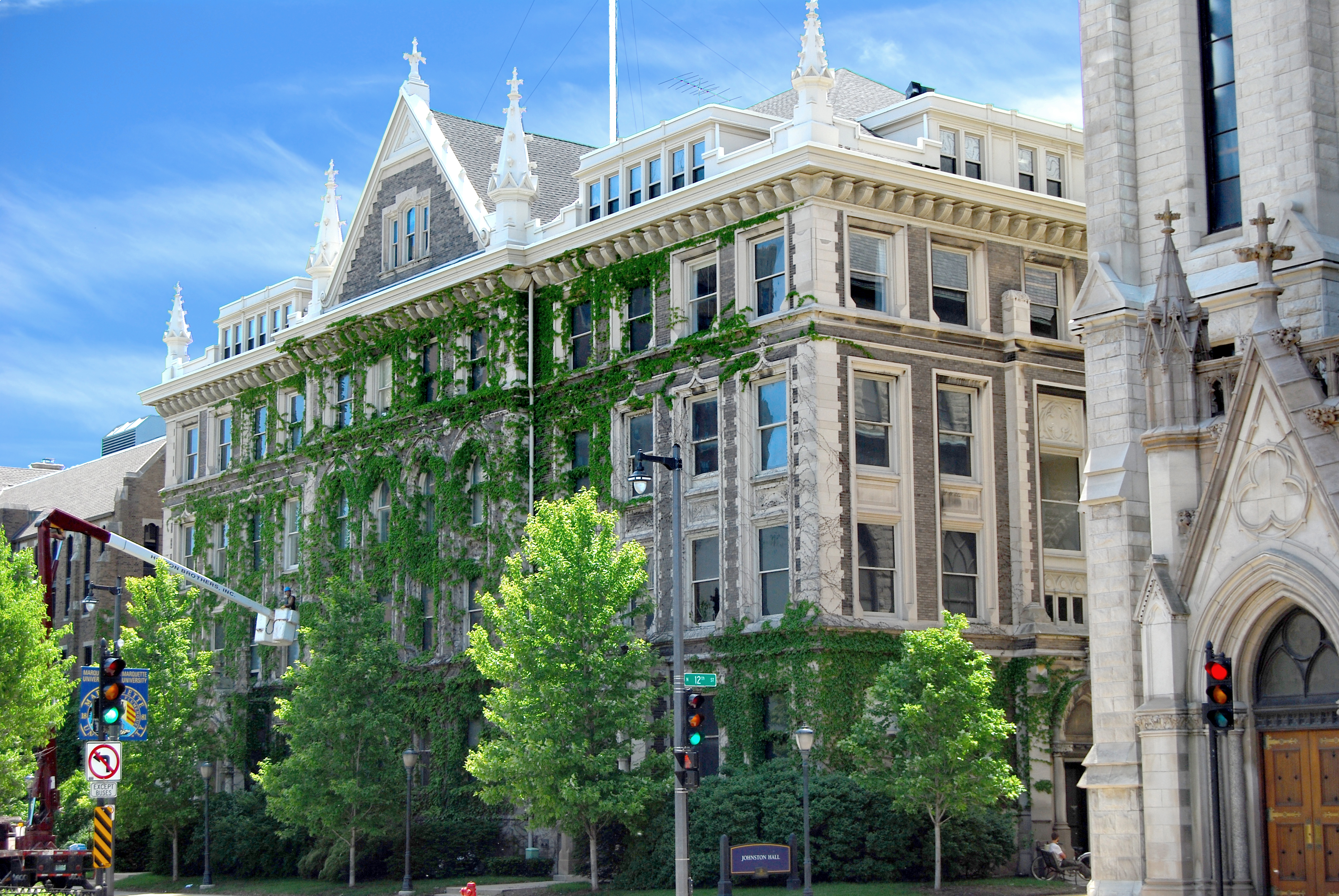
Johnson Hall, Marquette University

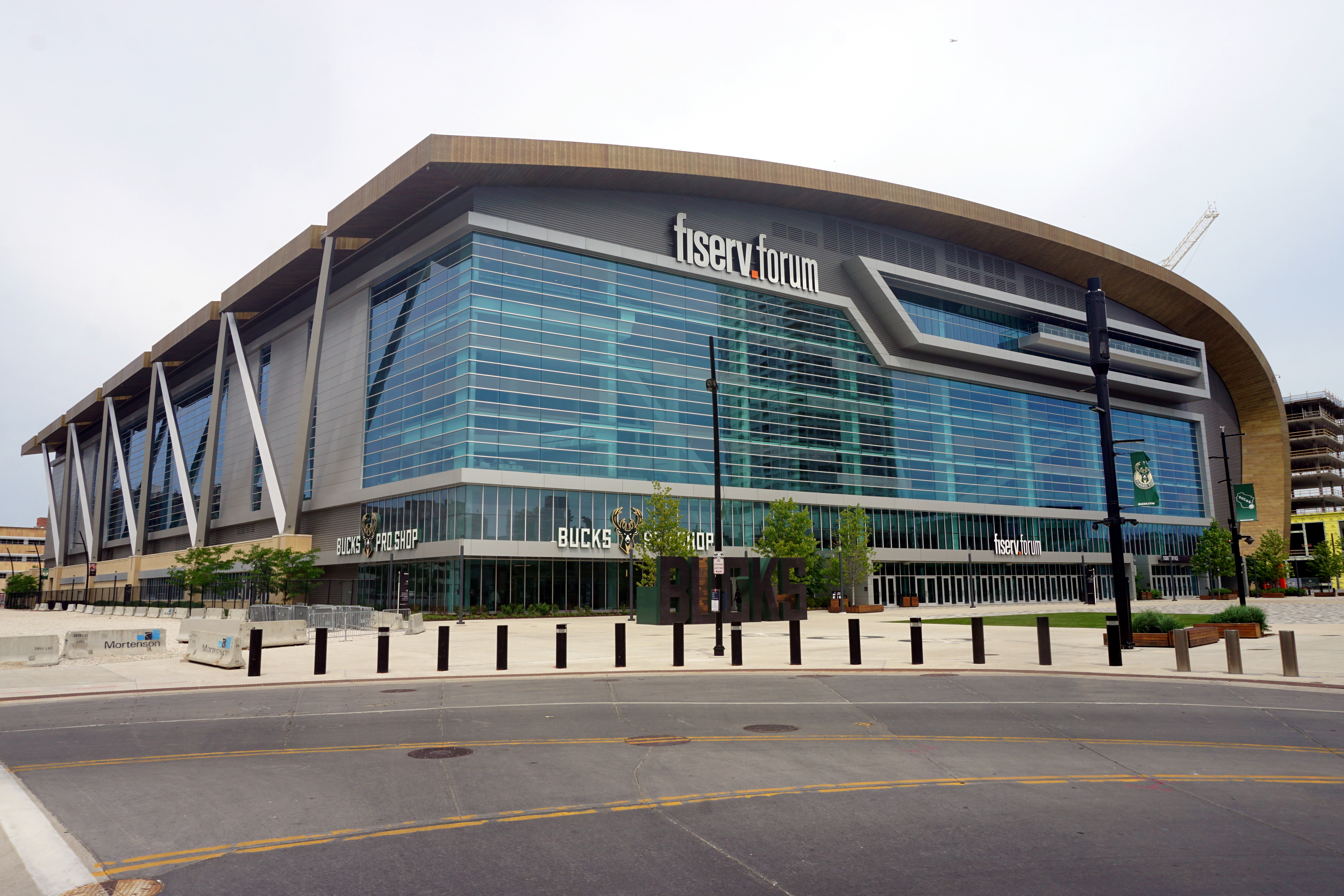
Fiserv Forum

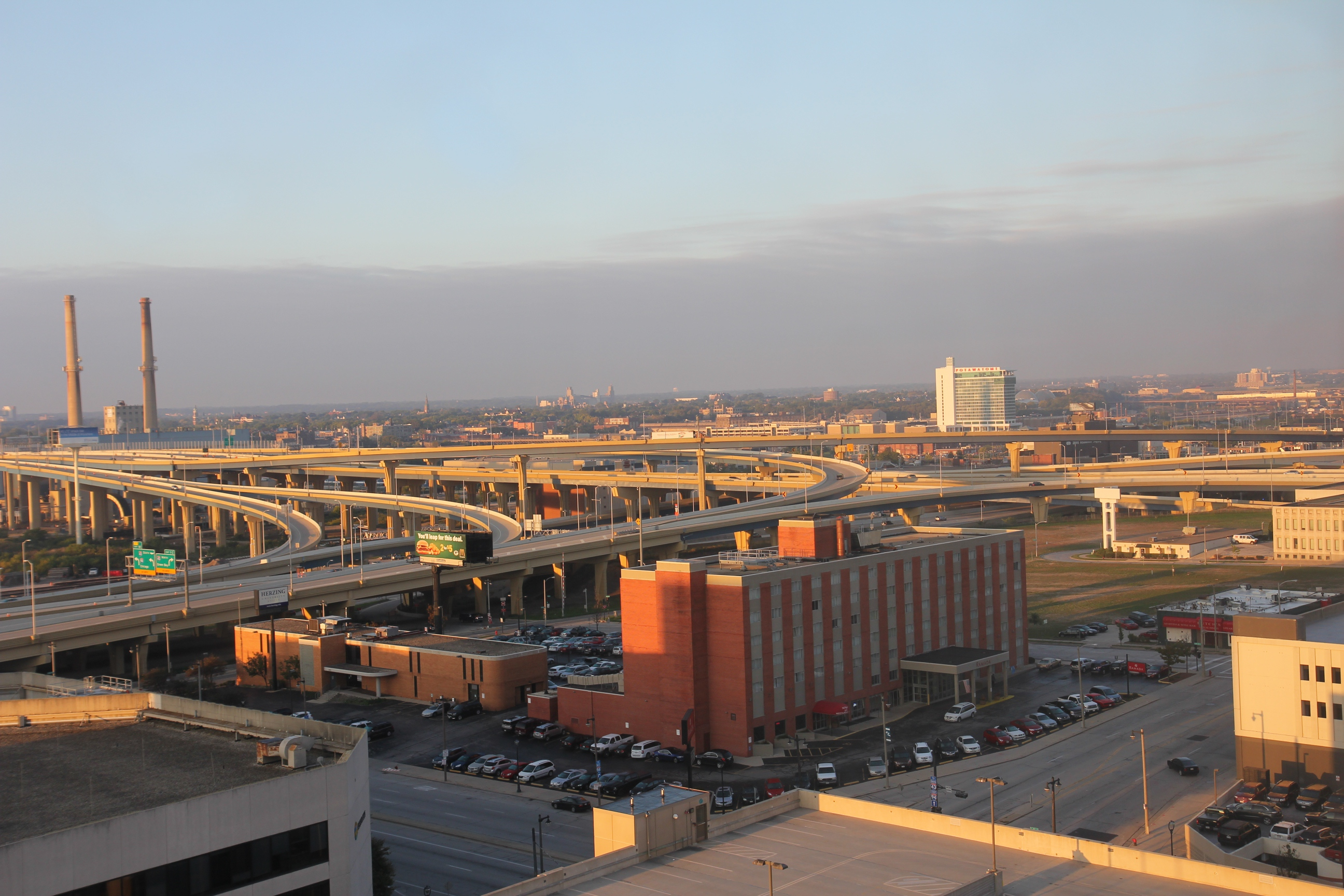
Marquette Interchange

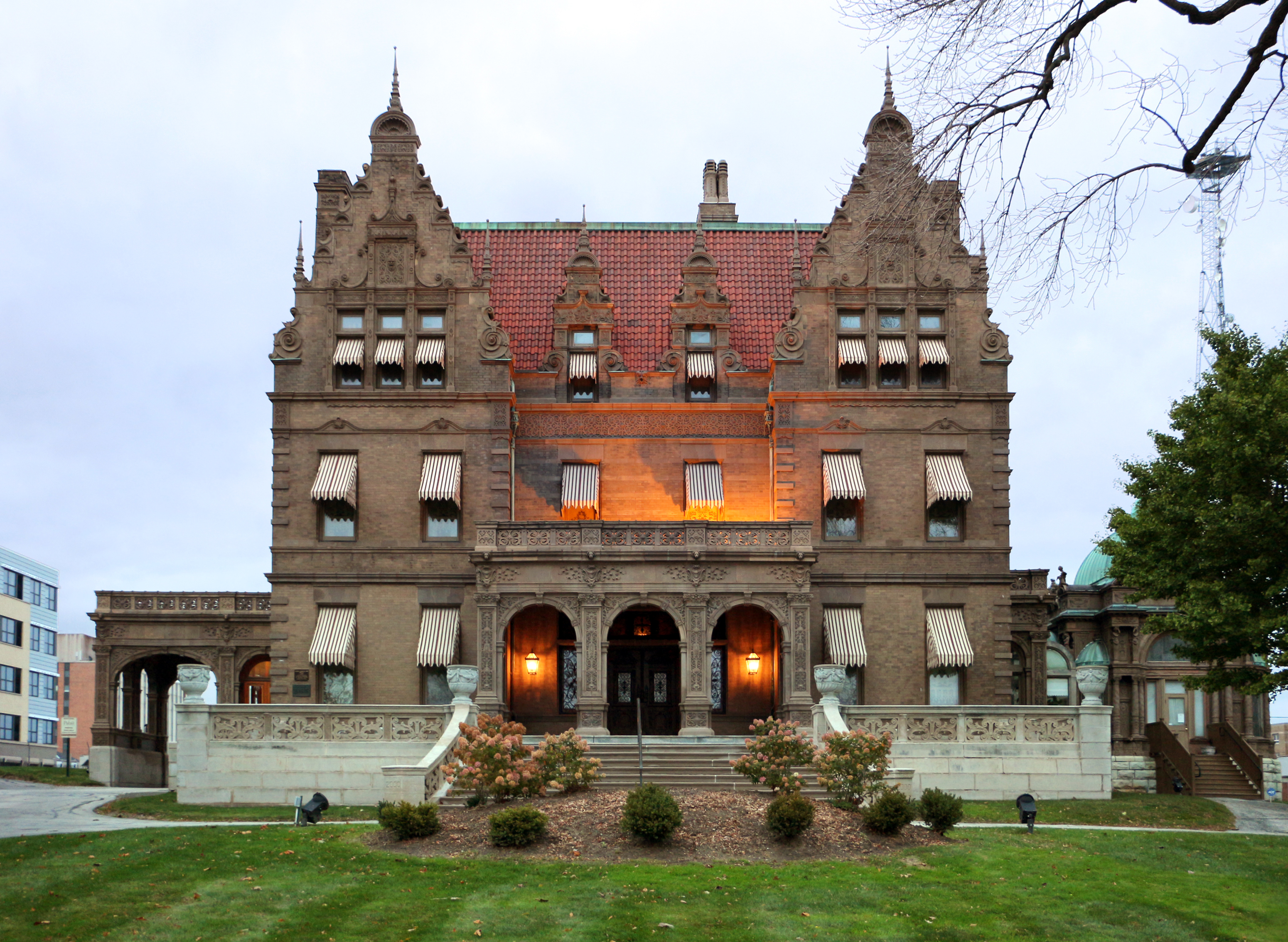
Pabst Mansion

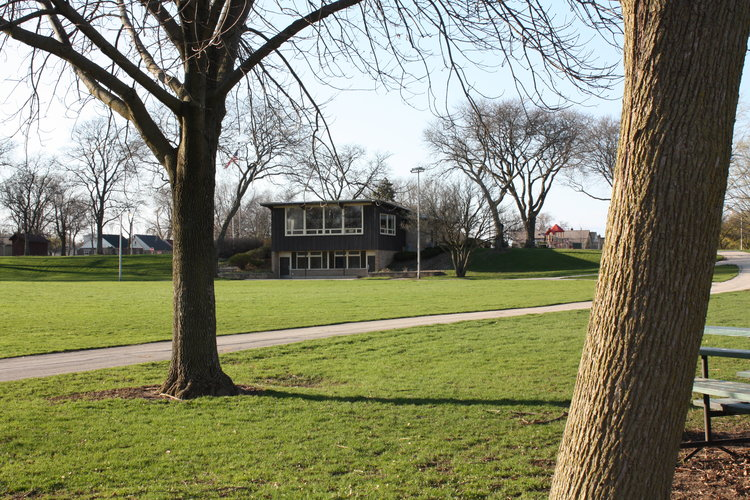
Cooper Park pavilion

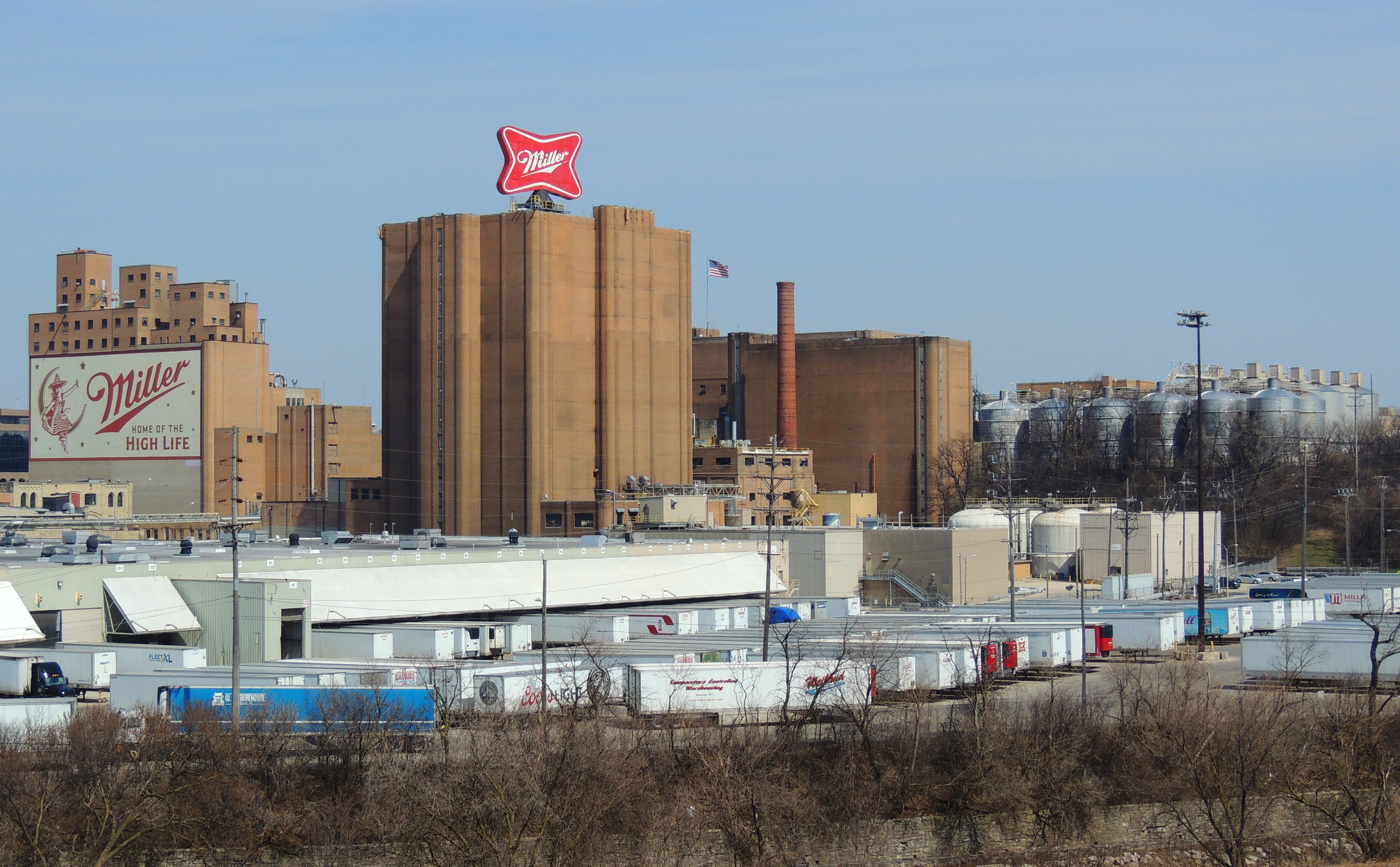
Miller Brewing Company

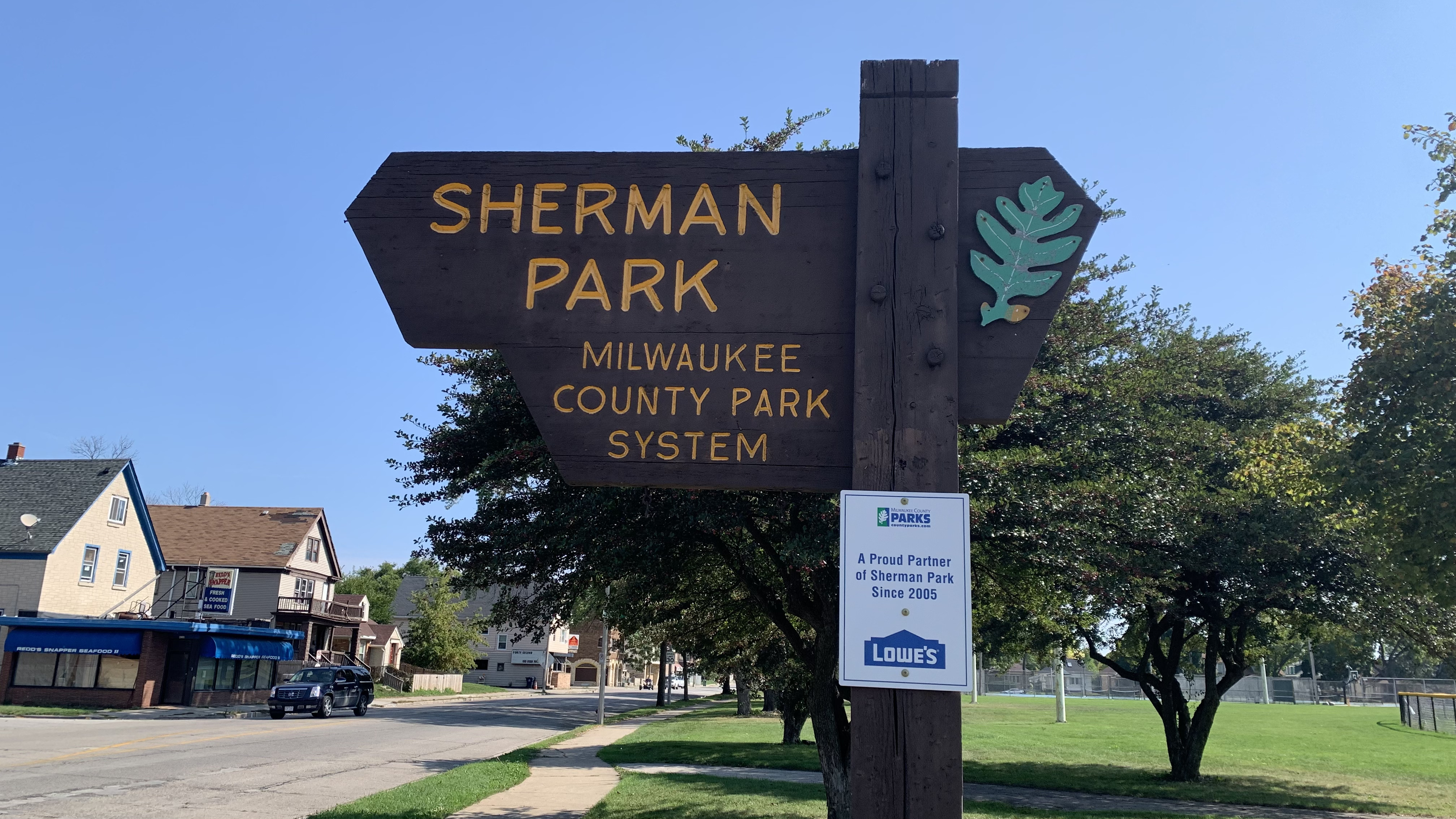
Sherman Park

== Past senators ==
At Wisconsin statehood the Senate had only nineteen districts, whose boundaries were defined in Article XIV of the Constitution of Wisconsin. The 6th district was defined as Grant County, in the southwest corner of the state.

After the fifth session (1852) of the state legislature, the Senate was expanded to 25 members and a reapportionment occurred. The 6th district was moved to the north side of Milwaukee County. Through the subsequent 160 years of redistricting, the 6th district has remained in this location, though the boundaries have shifted.

| Senator | Party | Notes | Session | Years | District Definition |
|---|---|---|---|---|---|
| District created | | | | 1848 | Grant County |
| George W. Lakin | Whig | | 1st | 1848 | Grant County |
| George W. Lakin | Whig | | 2nd | 1849 | Grant County |
| John H. Rountree | Whig | | 3rd | 1850 | Grant County |
| John H. Rountree | Whig | | 4th | 1851 | Grant County |
| Joel C. Squires | Dem. | Redistricted to 16th district. | 5th | 1852 | Grant County |
| Duncan Reed | Dem. | Redistricted from 18th district. | 6th | 1853 | Southern Milwaukee County: Town of Franklin; Town of Greenfield; Town of Lake; Town of Oak Creek; Wards 3, 4, 5, city of Milwaukee |
| Edward McGarry | Dem. | | 7th | 1854 | Southern Milwaukee County: Town of Franklin; Town of Greenfield; Town of Lake; Town of Oak Creek; Wards 3, 4, 5, city of Milwaukee |
| Edward McGarry | Dem. | | 8th | 1855 | Southern Milwaukee County: Town of Franklin; Town of Greenfield; Town of Lake; Town of Oak Creek; Wards 3, 4, 5, city of Milwaukee |
| Edward O'Neill | Dem. | | 9th | 1856 | Southern Milwaukee County: Town of Franklin; Town of Greenfield; Town of Lake; Town of Oak Creek; Wards 3, 4, 5, city of Milwaukee |
| Edward O'Neill | Dem. | | 10th | 1857 | Southern Milwaukee County: Town of Franklin; Town of Greenfield; Town of Lake; Town of Oak Creek; Town of Wauwatosa; Wards 3, 4, 5, city of Milwaukee |
| Patrick Walsh | Dem. | | 11th | 1858 | Southern Milwaukee County: Town of Franklin; Town of Greenfield; Town of Lake; Town of Oak Creek; Town of Wauwatosa; Wards 3, 4, 5, city of Milwaukee |
| Patrick Walsh | Dem. | | 12th | 1859 | Southern Milwaukee County: Town of Franklin; Town of Greenfield; Town of Lake; Town of Oak Creek; Town of Wauwatosa; Wards 3, 4, 5, city of Milwaukee |
| Michael J. Egan | Dem. | | 13th | 1860 | Southern Milwaukee County: Town of Franklin; Town of Greenfield; Town of Lake; Town of Oak Creek; Town of Wauwatosa; Wards 3, 4, 5, city of Milwaukee |
| Michael J. Egan | Dem. | | 14th | 1861 | Southern Milwaukee County: Town of Franklin; Town of Greenfield; Town of Lake; Town of Oak Creek; Town of Wauwatosa; Wards 3, 4, 5, city of Milwaukee |
| Edward Keogh | Dem. | | 15th | 1862 | Southern Milwaukee County: Town of Franklin; Town of Greenfield; Town of Lake; Town of Oak Creek; Town of Wauwatosa; Wards 3, 4, 5, 8, city of Milwaukee |
| Edward Keogh | Dem. | | 16th | 1863 | Southern Milwaukee County: Town of Franklin; Town of Greenfield; Town of Lake; Town of Oak Creek; Town of Wauwatosa; Wards 3, 4, 5, 8, city of Milwaukee |
| Hugh Reynolds | Dem. | | 17th | 1864 | Southern Milwaukee County: Town of Franklin; Town of Greenfield; Town of Lake; Town of Oak Creek; Town of Wauwatosa; Wards 3, 4, 5, 8, city of Milwaukee |
| Hugh Reynolds | Dem. | | 18th | 1865 | Southern Milwaukee County: Town of Franklin; Town of Greenfield; Town of Lake; Town of Oak Creek; Town of Wauwatosa; Wards 3, 4, 5, 8, city of Milwaukee |
| Charles H. Larkin | Dem. | | 19th | 1866 | Southern Milwaukee County: Town of Franklin; Town of Greenfield; Town of Lake; Town of Oak Creek; Town of Wauwatosa; Wards 3, 4, 5, 8, city of Milwaukee |
| Charles H. Larkin | Dem. | | 20th | 1867 | Southern Milwaukee County: Town of Franklin; Town of Greenfield; Town of Lake; Town of Oak Creek; Wards 3, 4, 5, 8, city of Milwaukee |
| Charles H. Larkin | Dem. | | 21st | 1868 | Southern Milwaukee County: Town of Franklin; Town of Greenfield; Town of Lake; Town of Oak Creek; Wards 3, 4, 5, 8, city of Milwaukee |
| Charles H. Larkin | Dem. | | 22nd | 1869 | Southern Milwaukee County: Town of Franklin; Town of Greenfield; Town of Lake; Town of Oak Creek; Wards 3, 4, 5, 8, city of Milwaukee |
| Peter V. Deuster | Dem. | | 23rd | 1870 | Southern Milwaukee County: Town of Franklin; Town of Greenfield; Town of Lake; Town of Oak Creek; Wards 3, 4, 5, 8, city of Milwaukee |
| Peter V. Deuster | Dem. | | 24th | 1871 | Southern Milwaukee County: Town of Franklin; Town of Greenfield; Town of Lake; Town of Oak Creek; Wards 3, 4, 5, 8, city of Milwaukee |
| John L. Mitchell | Dem. | | 25th | 1872 | Southern Milwaukee County: Town of Franklin; Town of Greenfield; Town of Lake; Town of Oak Creek; Wards 3, 4, 5, 7, 8, city of Milwaukee |
| John L. Mitchell | Dem. | | 26th | 1873 | Southern Milwaukee County: Town of Franklin; Town of Greenfield; Town of Lake; Town of Oak Creek; Wards 3, 4, 5, 7, 8, city of Milwaukee |
| John Black | Dem. | | 27th | 1874 | Southern Milwaukee County: Town of Franklin; Town of Greenfield; Town of Lake; Town of Oak Creek; Wards 3, 4, 5, 7, 8, city of Milwaukee |
| John Black | Dem. | | 28th | 1875 | Southern Milwaukee County: Town of Franklin; Town of Greenfield; Town of Lake; Town of Oak Creek; Wards 3, 4, 5, 7, 8, city of Milwaukee |
| John L. Mitchell | Dem. | | 29th | 1876 | Southern Milwaukee County: Town of Franklin; Town of Greenfield; Town of Lake; Town of Oak Creek; Wards 3, 4, 5, 7, 8, city of Milwaukee |
| John L. Mitchell | Dem. | | 30th | 1877 | Southern Milwaukee County: Town of Franklin; Town of Greenfield; Town of Lake; Town of Oak Creek; Wards 5, 8, 11, 12, city of Milwaukee |
| George H. Paul | Dem. | | 31st | 1878 | Southern Milwaukee County: Town of Franklin; Town of Greenfield; Town of Lake; Town of Oak Creek; Wards 5, 8, 11, 12, city of Milwaukee |
| George H. Paul | Dem. | | 32nd | 1879 | Southern Milwaukee County: Town of Franklin; Town of Greenfield; Town of Lake; Town of Oak Creek; Wards 5, 8, 11, 12, city of Milwaukee |
| George H. Paul | Dem. | | 33rd | 1880 | Southern Milwaukee County: Town of Franklin; Town of Greenfield; Town of Lake; Town of Oak Creek; Wards 5, 8, 11, 12, city of Milwaukee |
| George H. Paul | Dem. | | 34th | 1881 | Southern Milwaukee County: Town of Franklin; Town of Greenfield; Town of Lake; Town of Oak Creek; Wards 5, 8, 11, 12, city of Milwaukee |
| Enoch Chase | Dem. | | 35th | 1882 | Southern Milwaukee County: Town of Franklin; Town of Greenfield; Town of Lake; Town of Oak Creek; Wards 5, 8, 11, 12, city of Milwaukee |
| Enoch Chase | Dem. | | 36th | 1883–1884 | Southern Milwaukee County: Town of Franklin; Town of Greenfield; Town of Lake; Town of Oak Creek; Wards 5, 8, 11, 12, city of Milwaukee |
| Julius Wechselberg | Rep. | | 37th | 1885–1886 | Southern Milwaukee County: Town of Franklin; Town of Greenfield; Town of Lake; Town of Oak Creek; Wards 5, 8, 11, 12, city of Milwaukee |
| Julius Wechselberg | Rep. | | 38th | 1887–1888 | Southern Milwaukee County: Town of Franklin; Town of Greenfield; Town of Lake; Town of Oak Creek; Wards 5, 8, 11, 12, city of Milwaukee |
| Herman Kroeger | Union Labor | | 39th | 1889–1890 | Central Milwaukee County: Wards 3, 5, 8, 11, 12, 14, city of Milwaukee |
| Herman Kroeger | Dem. | | 40th | 1891–1892 | Central Milwaukee County: Wards 3, 5, 8, 11, 12, 14, city of Milwaukee |
| Oscar Altpeter | Dem. | | 41st | 1893–1894 | Central Milwaukee County: Wards 2, 4, 6, 9, city of Milwaukee |
| Oscar Altpeter | Dem. | | 42nd | 1895–1896 | Central Milwaukee County: Wards 2, 4, 6, 9, city of Milwaukee |
| William Devos | Rep. | Resigned in 1902. | 43rd | 1897–1898 | Central Milwaukee County: Wards 9, 10, 19, 20, city of Milwaukee |
| William Devos | Rep. | Resigned in 1902. | 44th | 1899–1900 | Central Milwaukee County: Wards 9, 10, 19, 20, city of Milwaukee |
| William Devos | Rep. | Resigned in 1902. | 45th | 1901–1902 | Central Milwaukee County: Wards 9, 10, 19, 20, city of Milwaukee |
| Rip Reukema | Rep. | Won 1902 special election. | 46th | 1903–1904 | Central Milwaukee County: Wards 9, 10, 19, 20, 22, city of Milwaukee |
| Jacob Rummel | Soc. Dem. | | 47th | 1905–1906 | Central Milwaukee County: Wards 9, 10, 19, 20, 22, city of Milwaukee |
| Jacob Rummel | Soc. Dem. | | 48th | 1907–1908 | Central Milwaukee County: Wards 9, 10, 19, 20, 22, city of Milwaukee |
| Winfield R. Gaylord | Soc. Dem. | | 49th | 1909–1910 | Central Milwaukee County: Wards 9, 10, 19, 20, 22, city of Milwaukee |
| Winfield R. Gaylord | Soc. Dem. | | 50th | 1911–1912 | Central Milwaukee County: Wards 9, 10, 19, 20, 22, city of Milwaukee |
| George Weissleder | Dem. | | 51st | 1913–1914 | Central Milwaukee County: Wards 6, 7, 9, 10, city of Milwaukee |
| George Weissleder | Dem. | | 52nd | 1915–1916 | Central Milwaukee County: Wards 6, 7, 9, 10, city of Milwaukee |
| W. C. Zumach | Soc. | | 53rd | 1917–1918 | Central Milwaukee County: Wards 6, 7, 9, 10, city of Milwaukee |
| W. C. Zumach | Soc. | | 54th | 1919–1920 | Central Milwaukee County: Wards 6, 7, 9, 10, city of Milwaukee |
| Joseph J. Hirsch | Soc. | | 55th | 1921–1922 | Central Milwaukee County: Wards 6, 7, 9, 10, city of Milwaukee |
| Joseph J. Hirsch | Soc. | | 56th | 1923–1924 | Central Milwaukee County: Wards 6, 7, 9, 10, city of Milwaukee |
| Joseph A. Padway | Soc. | Resigned in 1926. | 57th | 1925–1926 | Central Milwaukee County: Wards 6, 7, 9, 10, city of Milwaukee |
| Alex C. Ruffing | Soc. | Won 1926 special election. | 58th | 1927–1928 | Central Milwaukee County: Wards 6, 7, 9, 10, city of Milwaukee |
| Thomas M. Duncan | Soc. | | 59th | 1929–1930 | Central Milwaukee County: Wards 6, 7, 9, 10, city of Milwaukee |
| Thomas M. Duncan | Soc. | | 60th | 1931–1932 | Central Milwaukee County: Wards 6, 7, 9, 10, city of Milwaukee |
| Charles H. Phillips | Dem. | | 61st | 1933–1934 | Central Milwaukee County: Wards 2, 7, 10, 20, 25, city of Milwaukee |
| Charles H. Phillips | Dem. | | 62nd | 1935–1936 | Central Milwaukee County: Wards 2, 7, 10, 20, 25, city of Milwaukee |
| George Hampel | Prog. | | 63rd | 1937–1938 | Central Milwaukee County: Wards 2, 7, 10, 20, 25, city of Milwaukee |
| George Hampel | Prog. | | 64th | 1939–1940 | Central Milwaukee County: Wards 2, 7, 10, 20, 25, city of Milwaukee |
| George Hampel | Prog. | | 65th | 1941–1942 | Central Milwaukee County: Wards 2, 7, 10, 20, 25, city of Milwaukee |
| George Hampel | Prog. | | 66th | 1943–1944 | Central Milwaukee County: Wards 2, 7, 10, 20, 25, city of Milwaukee |
| Edward Reuther | Dem. | | 67th | 1945–1946 | Central Milwaukee County: Wards 2, 7, 10, 20, 25, city of Milwaukee |
| Edward Reuther | Dem. | | 68th | 1947–1948 | Central Milwaukee County: Wards 2, 7, 10, 20, 25, city of Milwaukee |
| William A. Schmidt | Dem. | | 69th | 1949–1950 | Central Milwaukee County: Wards 2, 7, 10, 20, 25, city of Milwaukee |
| William A. Schmidt | Dem. | | 70th | 1951–1952 | Central Milwaukee County: Wards 2, 7, 10, 20, 25, city of Milwaukee |
| William A. Schmidt | Dem. | | 71st | 1953–1954 | Central Milwaukee County: Wards 2, 7, 10, 20, 25, city of Milwaukee |
| William A. Schmidt | Dem. | | 72nd | 1955–1956 | Central Milwaukee County: Wards 7, 10, 13, city of Milwaukee |
| William R. Moser | Dem. | Resigned Feb. 1962. | 73rd | 1957–1958 | Central Milwaukee County: Wards 7, 10, 13, city of Milwaukee |
| William R. Moser | Dem. | Resigned Feb. 1962. | 74th | 1959–1960 | Central Milwaukee County: Wards 7, 10, 13, city of Milwaukee |
| William R. Moser | Dem. | Resigned Feb. 1962. | 75th | 1961–1962 | Central Milwaukee County: Wards 7, 10, 13, city of Milwaukee |
| --Vacant-- | | | 75th | 1961–1962 | Central Milwaukee County: Wards 7, 10, 13, city of Milwaukee |
| Martin J. Schreiber | Dem. | Won 1962 special election. Resigned after elected Governor in 1970. | 76th | 1963–1964 | Central Milwaukee County: Wards 7, 10, 13, city of Milwaukee |
| Martin J. Schreiber | Dem. | Won 1962 special election. Resigned after elected Governor in 1970. | 77th | 1965–1966 | North-central Milwaukee County: Ward 6, city of Glendale; Wards 1, 5, 7, city of Milwaukee |
| Martin J. Schreiber | Dem. | Won 1962 special election. Resigned after elected Governor in 1970. | 78th | 1967–1968 | North-central Milwaukee County: Ward 6, city of Glendale; Wards 1, 5, 7, city of Milwaukee |
| Martin J. Schreiber | Dem. | Won 1962 special election. Resigned after elected Governor in 1970. | 79th | 1969–1970 | North-central Milwaukee County: Ward 6, city of Glendale; Wards 1, 5, 7, city of Milwaukee |
| --Vacant-- | | | 80th | 1971–1972 | North-central Milwaukee County: Ward 6, city of Glendale; Wards 1, 5, 7, city of Milwaukee |
| Mark Lipscomb Jr. | Dem. | | 80th | 1971–1972 | North-central Milwaukee County: Ward 6, city of Glendale; Wards 1, 5, 7, city of Milwaukee |
| Monroe Swan | Dem. | Removed from office Oct. 1980. | 81st | 1973–1974 | North-central Milwaukee County: Assembly Dist. 16, 17, 18 |
| Monroe Swan | Dem. | Removed from office Oct. 1980. | 82nd | 1975–1976 | North-central Milwaukee County: Assembly Dist. 16, 17, 18 |
| Monroe Swan | Dem. | Removed from office Oct. 1980. | 83rd | 1977–1978 | North-central Milwaukee County: Assembly Dist. 16, 17, 18 |
| Monroe Swan | Dem. | Removed from office Oct. 1980. | 84th | 1979–1980 | North-central Milwaukee County: Assembly Dist. 16, 17, 18 |
| Gary R. George | Dem. | Defeated in 2003 recall primary. | 85th | 1981–1982 | North-central Milwaukee County: Assembly Dist. 16, 17, 18 |
| Gary R. George | Dem. | Defeated in 2003 recall primary. | 86th | 1983–1984 | North-central Milwaukee County: Wards 1-3, 4-18, 22-24, 29, 30, 67, 68, 105-122, 128, 131, 136, 183-199, 303, city of Milwaukee |
| Gary R. George | Dem. | Defeated in 2003 recall primary. | 87th | 1985–1986 | North-central Milwaukee County: Wards 1-3, 4-18, 22-24, 29, 30, 67, 68, 105-122, 128, 131, 136, 183-199, 303, city of Milwaukee |
| Gary R. George | Dem. | Defeated in 2003 recall primary. | 88th | 1987–1988 | North-central Milwaukee County: Wards 1-3, 4-18, 22-24, 29, 30, 67, 68, 105-122, 128, 131, 136, 183-199, 303, city of Milwaukee |
| Gary R. George | Dem. | Defeated in 2003 recall primary. | 89th | 1989–1990 | North-central Milwaukee County: Wards 1-3, 4-18, 22-24, 29, 30, 67, 68, 105-122, 128, 131, 136, 183-199, 303, city of Milwaukee |
| Gary R. George | Dem. | Defeated in 2003 recall primary. | 90th | 1991–1992 | North-central Milwaukee County: Wards 1-3, 4-18, 22-24, 29, 30, 67, 68, 105-122, 128, 131, 136, 183-199, 303, city of Milwaukee |
| Gary R. George | Dem. | Defeated in 2003 recall primary. | 91st | 1993–1994 | Central Milwaukee County: Wards 6, 7, 15, 16, 27, 32, 35, 63, 65-77, 111, 112, 114, 116-118, 120-130, 134-136, 175, 177-180, 184-190, 293, 294, 313, 314-322, 324-327, city of Milwaukee |
| Gary R. George | Dem. | Defeated in 2003 recall primary. | 92nd | 1995–1996 | Central Milwaukee County: Wards 6, 7, 15, 16, 27, 32, 35, 63, 65-77, 111, 112, 114, 116-118, 120-130, 134-136, 175, 177-180, 184-190, 293, 294, 313, 314-322, 324-327, city of Milwaukee |
| Gary R. George | Dem. | Defeated in 2003 recall primary. | 93rd | 1997–1998 | Central Milwaukee County: Wards 6, 7, 15, 16, 27, 32, 35, 63, 65-77, 111, 112, 114, 116-118, 120-130, 134-136, 175, 177-180, 184-190, 293, 294, 313, 314-322, 324-327, city of Milwaukee |
| Gary R. George | Dem. | Defeated in 2003 recall primary. | 94th | 1999–2000 | Central Milwaukee County: Wards 6, 7, 15, 16, 27, 32, 35, 63, 65-77, 111, 112, 114, 116-118, 120-130, 134-136, 175, 177-180, 184-190, 293, 294, 313, 314-322, 324-327, city of Milwaukee |
| Gary R. George | Dem. | Defeated in 2003 recall primary. | 95th | 2001–2002 | Central Milwaukee County: Wards 6, 7, 15, 16, 27, 32, 35, 63, 65-77, 111, 112, 114, 116-118, 120-130, 134-136, 175, 177-180, 184-190, 293, 294, 313, 314-322, 324-327, city of Milwaukee |
| Gary R. George | Dem. | Defeated in 2003 recall primary. | 96th | 2003–2004 | Central Milwaukee County: Wards 29-36, 60-62, 65-73, 81, 82, 84, 105-114, 116-131, 167-175, 179-181, 275-281, 290, 297-314, city of Milwaukee |
| Spencer Coggs | Dem. | Won 2003 recall election. | 96th | 2003–2004 | Central Milwaukee County: Wards 29-36, 60-62, 65-73, 81, 82, 84, 105-114, 116-131, 167-175, 179-181, 275-281, 290, 297-314, city of Milwaukee |
| Spencer Coggs | Dem. | Won 2003 recall election. | 97th | 2005–2006 | Central Milwaukee County: Wards 29-36, 60-62, 65-73, 81, 82, 84, 105-114, 116-131, 167-175, 179-181, 275-281, 290, 297-314, city of Milwaukee |
| Spencer Coggs | Dem. | Won 2003 recall election. | 98th | 2007–2008 | Central Milwaukee County: Wards 29-36, 60-62, 65-73, 81, 82, 84, 105-114, 116-131, 167-175, 179-181, 275-281, 290, 297-314, city of Milwaukee |
| Spencer Coggs | Dem. | Won 2003 recall election. | 99th | 2009–2010 | Central Milwaukee County: Wards 29-36, 60-62, 65-73, 81, 82, 84, 105-114, 116-131, 167-175, 179-181, 275-281, 290, 297-314, city of Milwaukee |
| Spencer Coggs | Dem. | Won 2003 recall election. | 100th | 2011–2012 | Central Milwaukee County: Wards 29-36, 60-62, 65-73, 81, 82, 84, 105-114, 116-131, 167-175, 179-181, 275-281, 290, 297-314, city of Milwaukee |
| Nikiya Harris Dodd | Dem. | | 101st | 2013–2014 | Central Milwaukee County: Part of the city of Milwaukee; Part of the city of Wauwatosa |
| Nikiya Harris Dodd | Dem. | | 102nd | 2015–2016 | Central Milwaukee County: Part of the city of Milwaukee; Part of the city of Wauwatosa |
| La Tonya Johnson | Dem. | | 103rd | 2017–2018 | Central Milwaukee County: Part of the city of Milwaukee; Part of the city of Wauwatosa |
| La Tonya Johnson | Dem. | | 104th | 2019–2020 | Central Milwaukee County: Part of the city of Milwaukee; Part of the city of Wauwatosa |
| La Tonya Johnson | Dem. | | 105th | 2021–2022 | Central Milwaukee County: Part of the city of Milwaukee; Part of the city of Wauwatosa |
| La Tonya Johnson | Dem. | | 106th | 2023–2024 | Central Milwaukee County |
| La Tonya Johnson | Dem. | | 107th | 2025–2026 | |

== See also ==
- Political subdivisions of Wisconsin
