= Senator Hirsch =

Senator Hirsch may refer to:

- Joseph J. Hirsch (1888–1960), Wisconsin State Senate
- Solomon Hirsch (1839–1902), Oregon State Senate

== See also ==
- Omer L. Hirst (1913–2003), Virginia State Senate
