= Winfield Gaylord =

American socialist politician (1870-1943)

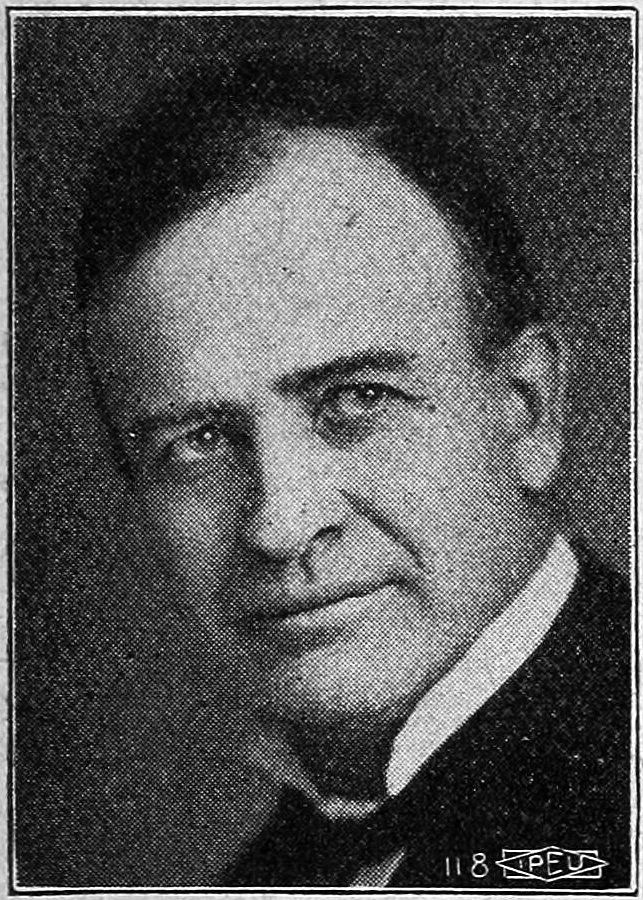
- Gaylord c. 1912

Member of the Wisconsin Senate from the 6th district
- In office January 4, 1909 – January 6, 1913
- Preceded by: Jacob Rummel
- Succeeded by: George Weissleder

Personal details
- Born: Winfield Romeo Gaylord; June 14, 1870 Verona, Mississippi, U.S.
- Died: February 23, 1943 (aged 72) Palmetto, Florida, U.S.
- Resting place: Palmetto Cemetery, Palmetto, Florida
- Party: Social Democratic
- Spouse: Olive Semarimus Brown
- Children: 1
- Education: Chicago Theological Seminary
- Occupation: Minister, lecturer, journalist

Winfield Romeo Gaylord (June 14, 1870 – February 23, 1943) was an American journalist, minister, and socialist lecturer. He represented the northwest side of the city of Milwaukee in the Wisconsin State Senate during the 1909 and 1911 sessions. He also ran for U.S. House of Representatives five times on the Socialist or Social Democratic ticket, and was a candidate for Governor of Wisconsin in 1906.

== Biography ==
=== Background ===
Gaylord was born June 14, 1870, in Verona, Mississippi, to Benjamin Franklin Gaylord (1835-1872) and Elsie Manelle Beebe Monismith (1842-1925). He attended public school in Cleveland, Ohio; studied at Ohio Wesleyan University, Hamline University, Northwestern University, and Chicago Theological Seminary, graduating from the latter school in 1908. He served as a pastor in various Methodist and Congregational churches in Minnesota, Illinois, and Wisconsin, from 1889 to 1902. From 1902 he worked as a lecturer on popular and economic subjects.

=== Political activity ===
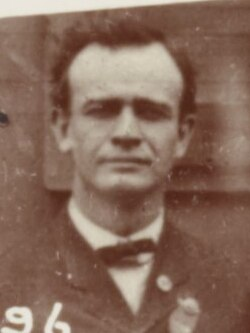
Gaylord at the first Socialist Party of America convention in Chicago, 1904

He served as a national lecturer for the Socialist Party and was a member of the Wisconsin state executive board of the Social Democratic Party. In 1904, he was nominated for U.S. House of Representatives from Wisconsin's 4th congressional district, losing to Republican incumbent Theobald Otjen. In 1906, he was the Socialist nominee for Governor of Wisconsin, losing to Republican acting Governor James O. Davidson, coming in third in a five-way race.

He was a delegate to the Milwaukee city charter convention of 1908, and his translation of Changes in the theory and tactics of the (German) social-democracy by Paul Kampffmeyer was published by Charles H. Kerr Publishing Company that same year.

=== Legislative service ===
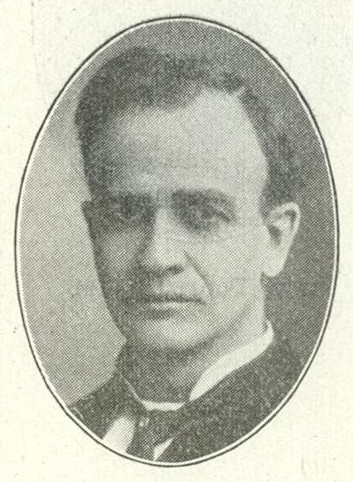
Gaylord's official State Senate portrait, 1909

Gaylord was elected in November 1908 to the Wisconsin Senate from the 6th State Senate district (9th, 10th, 19th, 20th and 22nd wards of the city of Milwaukee) for a four-year term to succeed fellow Socialist Jacob Rummel, receiving 6,236 votes against 5,820 for Republican August Langhoff. He was appointed to the standing committees on manufactures and labor, and on public health.

In 1910, he was again the Socialist nominee for the 4th congressional district, coming in a close second to Democratic incumbent William Joseph Cary. In that banner election year for the Socialist Party of Milwaukee, he came within 447 votes of unseating the incumbent.

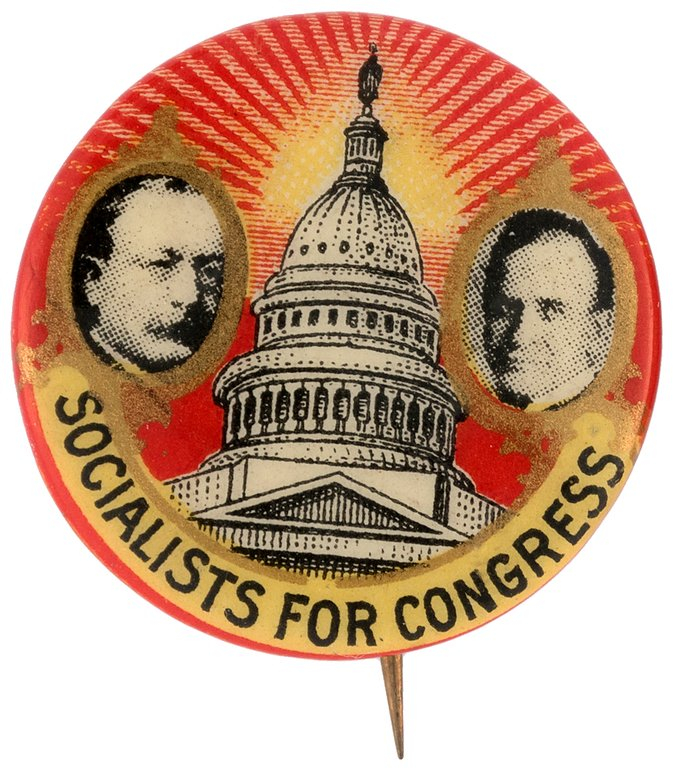
"Socialists for Congress" campaign button featuring Gaylord and Victor L. Berger

By 1911, he was the statewide organizer for the Socialist Party. In 1912, with his Senate district had been redistricted out of existence (it had been split between new Fifth and Sixth districts, which were taken by Republican George Weigel and Democrat George Weissleder respectively), he was again the Socialist nominee for the 4th congressional district, coming in second again to William Joseph Cary. He was also serving as chairman of the Socialist Party's statewide executive committee. He was a congressional candidate again in 1914, and came within 365 votes of unseating Cary. In 1916, he still came in second and received almost one-third of the vote, but Cary extended his winning margin over Gaylord to almost one thousand votes.

=== Influence and controversy ===
Gaylord was credited by Carl Sandburg with introducing him to the ideas of the Wisconsin wing of the Socialist Party, and with persuading him to move to Wisconsin.

In May 1917, Gaylord and A. M. Simons wrote a letter to U.S. senator Paul Husting denouncing him as a traitor to the anti-World War I majority of the Socialist convention in April 1917 and recommending his suppression from the government, claimed a communication published in the Congressional Record. Husting used this letter and additional communications from Gaylord to the Milwaukee Journal in support of the Espionage Act of 1917. As a result, the Milwaukee Central Committee of the Socialist Party took action against both Gaylord and Simons, expelling them for "Party Treason" by a vote of 63 to 2.

He became a leading member of the pro-war element within the labor movement in the United States, speaking on platforms with such conservative icons as Nicholas Murray Butler. He was among those who were present at the September 1917 organizing meeting of the Wisconsin Loyalty Legion. Gaylord died in Palmetto, Florida on February 23, 1943. His wife, Olive Semarimus Brown Gaylord (1872-1952), died nine years later.

Party political offices
Preceded by William A. Arnold	Social Democratic nominee for Governor of Wisconsin; 1906	Succeeded by Harvey Dee Brown
Wisconsin Senate
Preceded by Jacob Rummel	Member of the Wisconsin Senate from the 6th district January 4, 1909 – January 6, 1913	Succeeded by George Weissleder
