= W. C. Zumach =

American politician

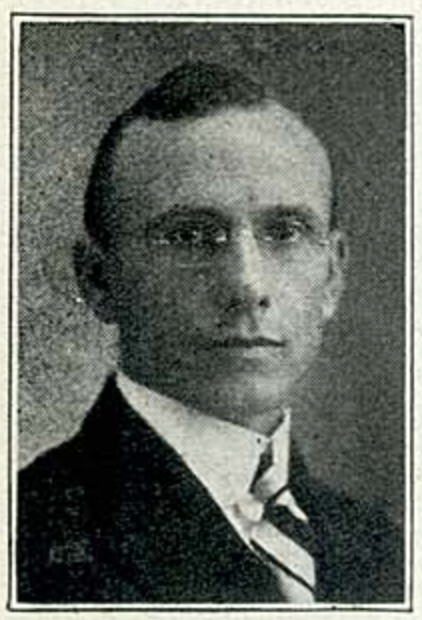
- Portrait from Wisconsin Blue Book 1917

Member of the Wisconsin Senate from the 6th district
- In office January 1, 1917 – January 3, 1921
- Preceded by: George Weissleder
- Succeeded by: Joseph J. Hirsch

Personal details
- Born: October 16, 1887 Black Creek, Wisconsin, U.S.
- Died: July 1981 (aged 93) Walnut Creek, California, U.S.
- Party: Socialist
- Spouse: Irma
- Occupation: Laborer, engineer

William C. Zumach (October 16, 1887 – July 1981) was an American laborer, engineer, union organizer, and Socialist politician from Milwaukee, Wisconsin. He represented the north side of the city of Milwaukee in the Wisconsin Senate during the 1917 and 1919 sessions.

== Background ==
Zumach was born on a farm in Black Creek, Wisconsin but moved with his parents to Milwaukee three years later and attended Milwaukee Public Schools. At the age of 16 he ran away from home and traveled all over the United States and Mexico for three years, working at railroad construction, railroad bridge building, railroad freight transfers, on dredge boats, in logging and turpentine camps; prospected, drove pack trains in mountains; and worked on fruit, grain and hop ranches, and in hotels and factories. He returned to Milwaukee in 1910 and was employed in the engineering department for the City of Milwaukee. In 1913 he was appointed an inspector for the Wisconsin Railroad Commission, and in 1914 was appointed special agent for the U. S. Commission on Industrial Relations to investigate strikes and strike-breaking agencies. After that he became a union organizer, until he was elected to the Senate in 1916.

Zumach was a strong advocate of cooperation between the Socialist and the Non-Partisan League, but was distressed by the failure of NPL congressmen to support Victor Berger when he was refused his seat in the House. He nonetheless became the manager of the Wisconsin branch of the League.

== Service in the Senate ==
Zumach was elected to the Senate for the 6th District (6th, 7th, 9th and 10th wards of the City of Milwaukee) in 1916 to succeed Democrat George Weissleder (who was not a candidate for re-election), receiving 4,147 votes to 4,006 for Republican Charles Meising, 1,744 for Democrat Charles Jungmann, and 73 for Prohibitionist Henry W. Schmidt. He was assigned to the standing committee on corporations. He did not run for re-election in 1920, but was succeeded by fellow Socialist Joseph Joshua Hirsch, who ran unopposed.

== After the Senate ==
As of April 1934, Zumach was announced as a speaker at the annual May Day celebration of the Socialist Party of Waukegan and North Chicago, Illinois. He was described as a member of the Socialist Party's state campaign committee when he was announced as a speaker at the September 9, 1934 annual picnic of the Dodge County party branch.

As of 1940 he was working as a tax assessor for the city of Milwaukee and living there with his wife Irma.

He died in July 1981; he had been living in Walnut Creek, California.

Wisconsin Senate
Preceded by George Weissleder	Member of the Wisconsin Senate from the 6th district January 1, 1917 – January 3, 1921	Succeeded by Joseph J. Hirsch
