= Rip Reukema =

American politician (1857–1917)

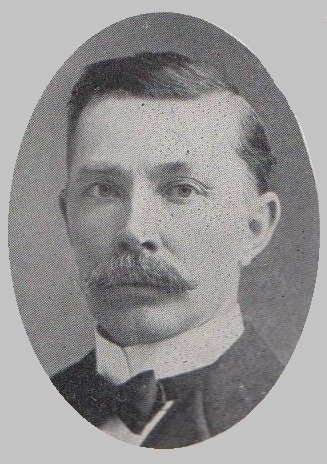

Member of the Wisconsin Senate from the 6th district
- In office January 5, 1903 – January 2, 1905
- Preceded by: William Devos
- Succeeded by: Jacob Rummel

Member of the Wisconsin State Assembly from the Milwaukee 5th district
- In office January 2, 1893 – January 7, 1895
- Preceded by: Conrad Krez
- Succeeded by: Albert Woller

Personal details
- Born: April 23, 1857 Milwaukee, Wisconsin, U.S.
- Died: September 17, 1917 (aged 60) Milwaukee, Wisconsin, U.S.
- Resting place: Union Cemetery, Milwaukee
- Party: Republican
- Spouse: Catalyntje Cornelia Vanden Broeke
- Children: Anje Maria (Veenendaal); (b. 1890; died 1980)

Ripke "Rip" Reukema (April 23, 1857 – September 17, 1917) was an American lawyer and Republican politician from Milwaukee, Wisconsin. He was a member of the Wisconsin State Senate (1903) and State Assembly (1893). He was of Dutch descent.

== Biography ==
Rip Reukema was born in Milwaukee, Wisconsin, to immigrants from the Netherlands. He was educated in the Milwaukee Public Schools and went on to study law in the offices of Nathan Pereles and E. P. Smith. He would become a lawyer, being admitted to practice in open court upon examination March 7, 1881. Reukema died on September 17, 1917, in Milwaukee.

== Political career ==
Reukema was elected to the Wisconsin State Assembly in 1892, serving in the 1893 session. A decade later, he won a 1902 special election to serve in the State Senate for the 1903 session, completing the term of William Devos, who had resigned to become collector of customs at the port of Milwaukee. He was a Republican. He was elected twice as Justice of the Peace. He served as director of the Milwaukee school board from 1897 to 1899, and member of the school board commission from 1901 to 1902. He was also the treasurer of the Milwaukee Bar Association, and director of the Citizens' Loan and Trust Company.

Wisconsin State Assembly
Preceded by Conrad Krez	Member of the Wisconsin State Assembly from the Milwaukee 5th district January 2, 1893 – January 7, 1895	Succeeded by Albert Woller
Wisconsin Senate
Preceded by William Devos	Member of the Wisconsin Senate from the 6th district January 5, 1903 – January 2, 1905	Succeeded by Jacob Rummel
