= Herman Kroeger =

19th century American politician

Member of the Wisconsin Senate from the 6th district
- In office January 7, 1889 – January 2, 1893
- Preceded by: Julius Wechselberg
- Succeeded by: Oscar Altpeter

Personal details
- Born: December 16, 1831 Coesfeld, Westphalia, Prussia
- Died: June 20, 1916 (aged 84) Milwaukee, Wisconsin, U.S.
- Resting place: Holy Trinity Cemetery, Milwaukee, Wisconsin
- Party: Democratic; Union Labor (1889–1890)
- Spouses: Anna Maria Artus (died 1874); Catharine Schmutte (died 1910)
- Children: with Anna Maria Artus; Casper Henry Kroeger^{(b. 1858; died 1917)}; Mary Lydia (Maria Elisabeth) Kroeger^{(b. 1866; died 1937)}; Lambert Kroeger^{(b. 1870; died 1873)}; with Catharine Schmutte; Infant^{(b. 1878; died 1879)}; Josephus M. Kroeger^{(b. 1881; died 1925)}

Herman Kroeger (December 16, 1831 – June 20, 1916) was a German American immigrant, dry goods merchant, and politician. He served a four-year term in the Wisconsin State Senate representing the south side of the city of Milwaukee. He was elected as a Democrat, but was affiliated with Wisconsin's socialist Union Labor Party for part of his Senate term.

== Background ==
Kroeger was born in Coesfeld in what is now the state of North Rhine-Westphalia in western Germany. At the time of his birth, this was the Province of Westphalia in the Kingdom of Prussia. He received a common school education and emigrated to the United States as a boy in 1844. He settled in Milwaukee, Wisconsin Territory, where he earned a living as a dry goods merchant.

== Public office ==
Kroeger was alderman for the Fifth Ward for the years 1858 and 1859. In 1888, he was nominated for Mayor of Milwaukee as a Union Labor candidate. Kroeger advocated public ownership of municipal improvements, the establishment of public baths and a law permitting the recall of city officials. His campaign was taken so seriously that the Republicans and Democrats united to run a fusion candidate against him. He was nearly elected anyway, with 15,033 votes to 15,978 for the "Citizens' Party" candidate, Thomas H. Brown. Radical Socialist Labor Party candidate Colin Campbell, backed by Paul Grottkau (imprisoned editor of the Arbeiter-Zeitung) garnered 964 votes, just enough to keep Kroeger from winning if they had gone to him instead.

In November of that same year, Kroeger was elected to the State Senate as a Democrat for a four-year term to succeed Republican Julius Wechselberg, with 6,864 votes to 5,070 for Republican A. W. Hill. By the time of the printing of the 1889 Wisconsin Blue Book, however, his party affiliation was listed as "Union Labor". He was assigned to the standing committees on public lands and on engrossed bills.

By the time of the publication of the 1891 Blue Book he had returned to the Democratic Party label. He was made chair of the standing committees on manufactures and commerce, and was also assigned to the committees on railroads and public lands. He did not run for re-election in 1892, and was succeeded by Democrat Oscar Altpeter. He died in 1916.

== Personal life ==
At the time of his 1888 election to the Senate, he was married.

Wisconsin Senate
Preceded by Julius Wechselberg	Member of the Wisconsin Senate from the 6th district January 7, 1889 – January 2, 1893	Succeeded by Oscar Altpeter
