= Julius Wechselberg =

American politician (1838-1924)

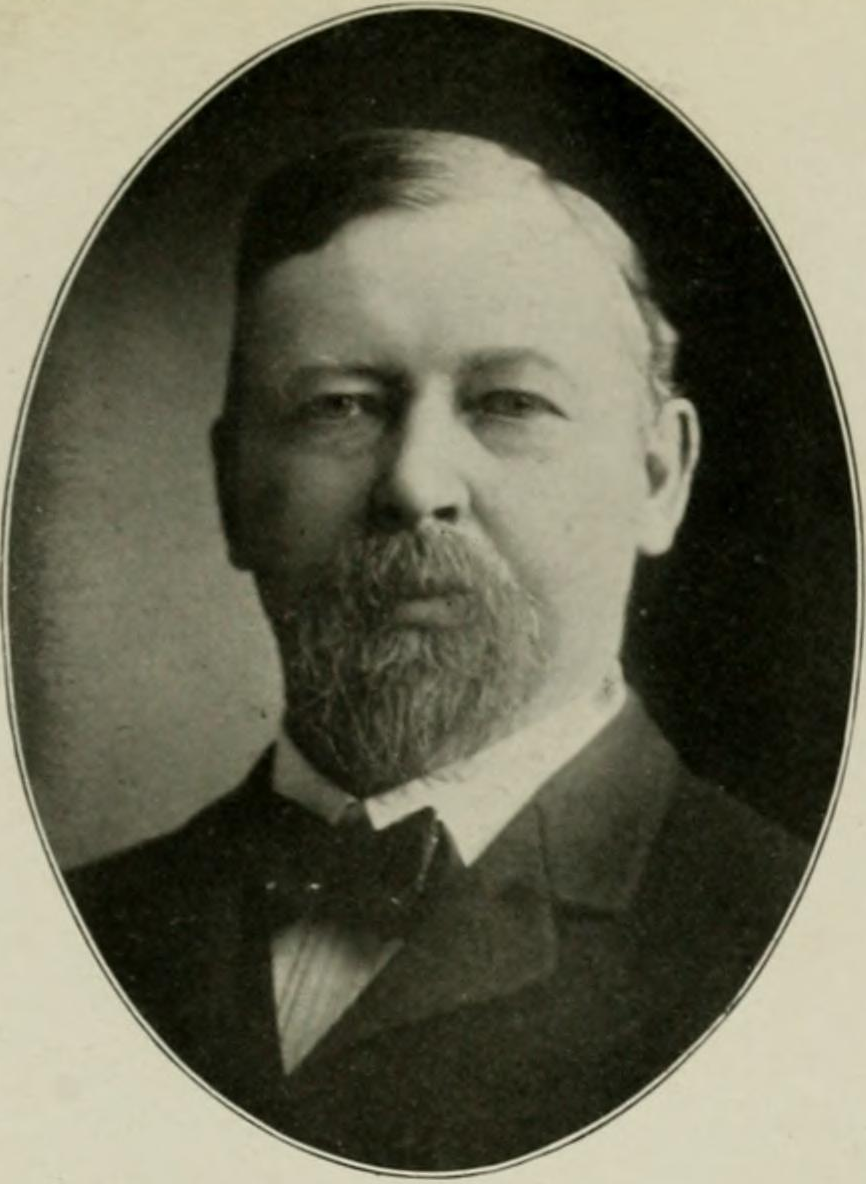
- From Notable Men of Wisconsin (1902)

Member of the Wisconsin Senate from the 6th district
- In office January 5, 1885 – January 7, 1889
- Preceded by: Enoch Chase
- Succeeded by: Herman Kroeger

Wisconsin Circuit Court Clerk for Milwaukee County
- In office January 1, 1877 – January 1, 1883
- Preceded by: Pat Connolly
- Succeeded by: Christian Paulus

Personal details
- Born: March 9, 1838 Barmen, Rhine Province, Kingdom of Prussia
- Died: May 17, 1924 (aged 86)
- Party: Republican
- Spouse: Cecilia Louise Whitney (died 1893)
- Children: Nellie Francis (Hennekemper)^{(b. 1863; died 1956)}; William Rudolph Wechselberg^{(b. 1868; died 1883)}
- Occupation: Real estate broker

Julius Wechselberg (March 9, 1838 – May 17, 1924) was a German American immigrant, carriage maker, lawyer, real estate broker, and Republican politician. He was a member of the Wisconsin State Senate, representing southern Milwaukee County in the 1885 and 1887 sessions.

== Background ==
Wechselberg was born in Barmen in the Rhine Province of the Kingdom of Prussia on March 9, 1838, and came to Wisconsin with his parents in 1848 (his father did not want his sons to be conscripted into the Prussian Army). The family initially lived in a log cabin in the Town of Lake. He received a common school and commercial education, and settled at Milwaukee, where he first went to work for a carriage maker at a salary of $30 a year (plus board). He later established the Thos. H. Brown carriage manufacturing works in 1861; he was in the carriage manufacturing business until 1879, then became a real estate dealer. Wechselberg went on to develop what is now the North Grant Boulevard Historic District, listed on the National Register of Historic Places.

== Public office ==
Wechselberg was alderman of his ward from 1872 to 1876, and was then elected clerk of circuit court of Milwaukee County, serving from 1877 to 1883; during this period, he studied law and became an attorney. He declined re-nomination in 1882 to devote more time to his real estate business.

In 1884, he was elected to a four-year term in the Wisconsin State Senate, defeating incumbent Democratic state senator Enoch Chase. Wechselberg represented Wisconsin's 6th State Senate district, which then comprised the 5th, 8th, 11th and 12th wards of the city of Milwaukee, as well as the towns of Franklin, Greenfield, Lake and Oak Creek, which roughly comprised the southern half of Milwaukee County.

In the State Senate, he was assigned to the standing committee on privileges and elections, and to the joint committee on printing. In the next session he was chairman of the committee on finance, banks, and insurance, and was also assigned to the committee on engrossed bills. He did not run for re-election in 1888, and was succeeded in office by Herman Kroeger, who was elected as a nominal Democrat but changed his party affiliation to Union Labor (the party which had almost elected him as Mayor of Milwaukee earlier that year).

In 1892, Wechselberg was the Republican nominee for United States House of Representatives from Wisconsin's 5th congressional district, losing to Democratic incumbent George Brickner due to Brickner's margins in the portions of the district outside Milwaukee County.

He was an alternate delegate to the 1916 Republican National Convention.

== After political office ==
He was described in a 1922 Milwaukee Telegram article as "the oldest realtor in Milwaukee", as well as the oldest member and dean of past masters of the Kilbourn Masonic Lodge (the oldest in Milwaukee).

He died May 17, 1924.

== Electoral history ==
=== Wisconsin Senate (1884) ===
Wisconsin Senate, 6th District Election, 1884
Party	Candidate	Votes	%	±%
General Election, November 4, 1884
Republican	Julius Wechselberg	5,512	53.94%	+9.25%
Democratic	Enoch Chase (incumbent)	4,642	45.43%	−7.87%
Prohibition	Julius Cheyne	64	0.63%	
Plurality		870	8.51%	-0.09%
Total votes		10,218	100.0%	+118.29%
Republican gain from Democratic				

=== U.S. House of Representatives (1892) ===
Wisconsin's 5th Congressional District Election, 1892
Party	Candidate	Votes	%	±%
General Election, November 8, 1892
Democratic	George H. Brickner (incumbent)	17,929	51.67%	−15.53%
Republican	Julius Wechselberg	15,960	45.99%	+15.28%
Prohibition	Marcellus Andier	786	2.27%	+0.17%
	Scattering	25	0.07%	
Plurality		1,969	5.67%	-30.81%
Total votes		34,700	100.0%	+31.67%
Republican hold				
