= George H. Brickner =

American politician (1834–1904)

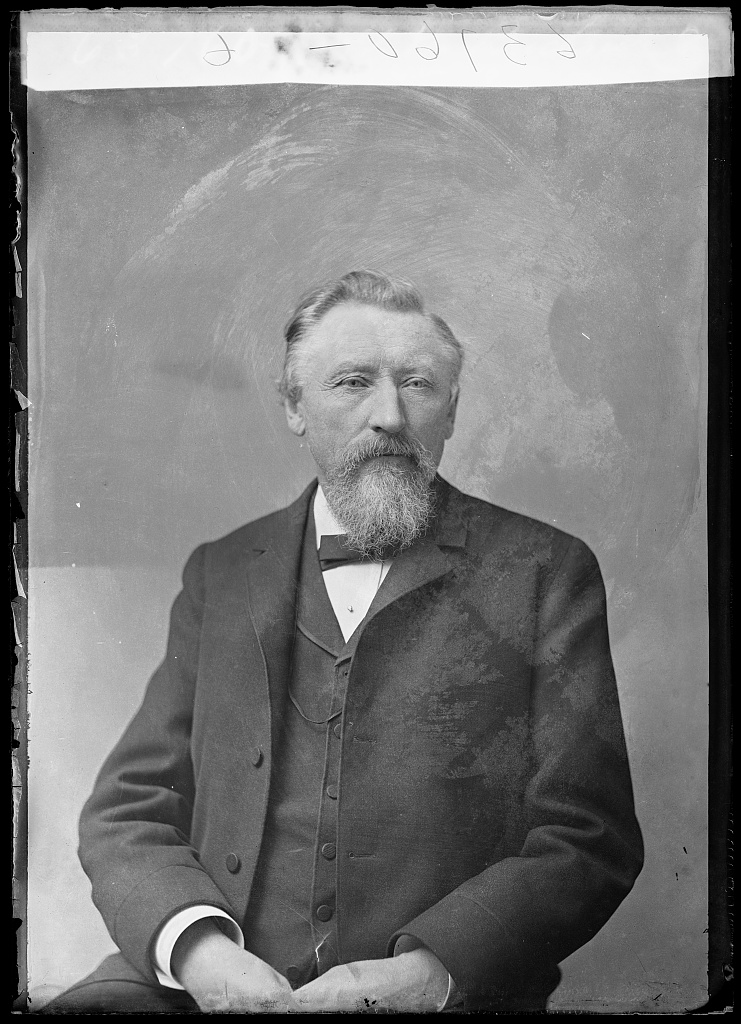

Member of the U.S. House of Representatives from Wisconsin's 5th district
- In office March 4, 1889 – March 3, 1895
- Preceded by: Thomas R. Hudd
- Succeeded by: Samuel S. Barney

Village President of Sheboygan Falls, Wisconsin
- In office April 1880 – April 1881
- Preceded by: John E. Thomas
- Succeeded by: John Kaestner

Personal details
- Born: January 21, 1834 Ansbach, Kingdom of Bavaria
- Died: August 12, 1904 (aged 70) Sheboygan Falls, Wisconsin, U.S.
- Resting place: Saint Marys Cemetery, Sheboygan Falls
- Party: Democratic
- Spouse: Anna Elizabeth Ogle (m. 1858; died 1903)
- Children: Georgiana (Hawkins)^{(b. 1859; died 1944)}; Mary Margaret (Chase)^{(b. 1861; died 1893)}; William Clay Brickner^{(b. 1863; died 1942)}; Lillah Isabella Brickner^{(b. 1865; died 1901)}
- Occupation: Businessman, politician

George H. Brickner (January 21, 1834 – August 12, 1904) was a German American immigrant, businessman, Democratic politician, and Wisconsin pioneer. He was a member of the U.S. House of Representatives, representing Wisconsin's 5th congressional district from 1889 to 1895. Brickner was an important businessman in the development of Sheboygan Falls, Wisconsin, and was responsible for establishing the first Catholic church in the city. His name was sometimes abbreviated G. H. Brickner.

== Early life ==
George Brickner was born in January 1834 in the village of Ansbach, in what was then the Kingdom of Bavaria (now part of southern Germany). He emigrated to the United States with his parents at age 6. His family initially settled in Seneca County, Ohio, where his father purchased a farm. Brickner was educated in the public schools in Seneca County and worked on his father's arm until age 16, when he went to work as a clerk in a general store in Tiffin, Ohio, earning a salary of $5 per month (about $200 adjusted for inflation). He worked for five years, increasing his responsibility and pay, before starting his own business with a partner in 1855. But he quickly quit the business and sold his share to his partner and decided to move west on his own. On departing home, his father gave him a gift of $200 (about $7200 adjusted for inflation).

== Business career ==
In August 1855, Brickner arrived at Cascade, Wisconsin, in Sheboygan County, and opened a general store. He operated the store successfully until 1868, when he became a business partner to B. F. Heald in the ownership of the Sheboygan Falls Woolen Mills, buying out Heald's previous partner William H. Prentice. After four years, Brickner also bought out Heald's share, and became sole owner of the company. Around that time he also purchased the Riverside Mills, incorporating them into his business. He re-incorporated in May 1887 as the Brickner Woolen Mills Company. In 1889, he also purchased a glass factory in Tiffin, Ohio, in partnership with Mr. Schieck, manufacturing a unique colored window glass.

== Political career ==
Brickner was a member of the Catholic Church, and, like many German Catholics of 19th century Wisconsin, he became involved in politics with the Democratic Party. He won his first elected office in the 1860s, when he was elected treasurer of the town of Lyndon. In 1880 he was elected president of the village of Sheboygan Falls, Wisconsin, and was ex officio a member of the Sheboygan County Board of Supervisors. That year, he was also chosen by the Democratic Party of Wisconsin as a presidential elector, though Wisconsin voters chose the Republican slate in the 1880 presidential election.

Wisconsin's 5th congressional district 1882–1891

Brickner was a frequent delegate to state and district level conventions during the 1870s and 1880s. In 1888, Democrats in Wisconsin's 5th congressional district sought to send a message of disapproval to their incumbent U.S. representative Thomas R. Hudd. A plan was formulated in which delegates attending the district nominating convention would cast their votes on the first ballot for a favorite son of their own counties—Brickner for Sheboygan County, Frederick W. Horn for Ozaukee County, and Joseph Vilas for Manitowoc County. At the convention, Vilas convinced his delegates to vote instead for Brickner and recruited enough delegates from other counties to secure Brickner's nomination. Brickner did not originally seek the nomination, but consented to Vilas' plan.

A major issue in the 1888 election was tariff reform, which Republicans suggested would harm the American wool industry due to lowering barriers to foreign competition. So it was considered notable that Brickner—a major wool manufacturer—favored the so-called "free wool" reform. In his first election, Brickner was described as a poor politician, due to thrifty management of his funds and failure engage in standard political niceties. The 5th congressional district, however, was the most reliably Democratic district in the state, so Brickner still won a fairly comfortable victory, receiving 55% of the vote, defeating Green Bay city councilmember Gustav Küstermann.

After his election, Brickner faced questions about his citizenship status. He insisted that he was a citizen but implied that he may not have had paperwork verifying that status. The issue was ultimately resolved and Brickner was sworn in at the start of the 51st Congress. Brickner was described as a good representative in his first term and was renominated without opposition in 1890. Another major factor in the 1890 elections in Wisconsin was backlash to the Bennett Law, passed by the Wisconsin Legislature in 1889. The law established compulsory English-language education in Wisconsin; it was extremely unpopular with Wisconsin's immigrant communities, which in many cases had schools which gave instruction in their native languages. The backlash against Republicans in Wisconsin resulted in one of the most lopsided Democratic victories in the state since the creation of the Republican Party. Nationally, Republicans also faced backlash due to the McKinley Tariff. Brickner received more than 67% of the vote in his re-election campaign, easily defeating three-time Sheboygan mayor Thomas M. Blackstock.

Wisconsin's 5th congressional district 1892–1901

In the 52nd Congress, Brickner was responsible for securing an appropriation for a government building and harbor improvements in Sheboygan. During that term, reapportionment from the 1890 United States census resulted in Wisconsin receiving a ninth congressional district. A redistricting act was passed by the Wisconsin Legislature, and Brickner's district was significantly reshaped. Brown, Kewaunee, Manitowoc, and Calumet counties were removed; Washington, Waukesha, and the northern half of Milwaukee County were added. In the new district, Brickner faced a difficult contest for renomination from Waukesha lawyer Timothy E. Ryan. At a contentious convention, Brickner managed to win four delegates from Washington County, which, with the ten Sheboygan delegates and five Ozaukee delegates, were just enough to win renomination.

The general election race was also more difficult than Brickner's previous elections, as the new district was significantly more politically competitive. He narrowly defeated Milwaukee state senator Julius Wechselberg, receiving 51.7% of the vote. In the 53rd Congress, he was chairman of the subcommittee on lighthouses and life-saving services, a subcommittee of the House Interstate and Foreign Commerce Committee.

During the 53rd Congress, Brickner voted against silver coinage, which put him at odds with the prevailing sentiment in the Democratic Party. In August 1894, Brickner announced he would not seek renomination for a fourth term. Brickner was succeeded by Republican Samuel S. Barney. Brickner remained popular and was suggested as a candidate for congress again 1896, 1898, and 1900, but he did not seek the nomination again.

== Personal life and legacy ==
George Brickner was the fourth of nine children born to Michael and Margaret (née Reddelbach) Brickner (previously Bückner).

On September 9, 1858, George Brickner married Anna Elizabeth Ogle, a descendant of the Ogle family of Maryland. They had four children together and were married for nearly 45 years before her death in 1903. Their son, William Clay Brickner was a partner in the business and took over after George Brickner's death. Anna's nephew, Frank A. Ogle, was also an officer in the company.

After leaving Congress, Brickner organized the establishment of the first Catholic Church at Sheboygan Falls, St. Mary's, in 1896; before that time, Catholics had to go to Sheboygan for mass. Brickner died suddenly of a heart attack on August 12, 1904, while walking outside of his mill in Sheboygan Falls.

Brickner Mills was purchased by Lacon Woolen Mills in 1940 and continued operating as a wool mill until purchased again in 1960, by Feldmann Engineering and Manufacturing Co. The Brickner Mills building in Sheboygan Falls still stands along the shore of the Sheboygan River. It was converted into apartments in 1992, hosting 34 affordable one- and two-bedroom units.

== Electoral history ==
=== U.S. House (1888, 1890, 1892) ===
Year	Election	Date	Elected				Defeated				Total	Plurality
1888	General	Nov. 6	George H. Brickner	Democratic	17,051	55.15%	Gustav Küstermann	Rep.	12,825	41.48%	30,917	4,226
1888	General	Nov. 6	George H. Brickner	Democratic	17,051	55.15%	Charles Hatch	Lab.	854	2.76%	30,917	4,226
1888	General	Nov. 6	George H. Brickner	Democratic	17,051	55.15%	E. M. Dick	Proh.	179	0.58%	30,917	4,226
1890	General	Nov. 4	George H. Brickner (inc)	Democratic	17,708	67.20%	Thomas M. Blackstock	Rep.	8,093	30.71%	26,353	9,615
1890	General	Nov. 4	George H. Brickner (inc)	Democratic	17,708	67.20%	George McKenney	Proh.	552	2.09%	26,353	9,615
1892	General	Nov. 8	George H. Brickner (inc)	Democratic	17,929	51.67%	Julius Wechselberg	Rep.	15,960	45.99%	34,700	1,969
1892	General	Nov. 8	George H. Brickner (inc)	Democratic	17,929	51.67%	Marcellus Andier	Proh.	786	2.27%	34,700	1,969

Political offices
Preceded by John E. Thomas	Village President of Sheboygan Falls, Wisconsin; April 1880 – April 1881	Succeeded by John Kaestner
U.S. House of Representatives
Preceded by Thomas R. Hudd	Member of the U.S. House of Representatives from Wisconsin's 5th congressional district March 4, 1889 – March 3, 1895	Succeeded by Samuel S. Barney
