= Joseph Arthur Padway =

American labor lawyer and politician (1891–1947)

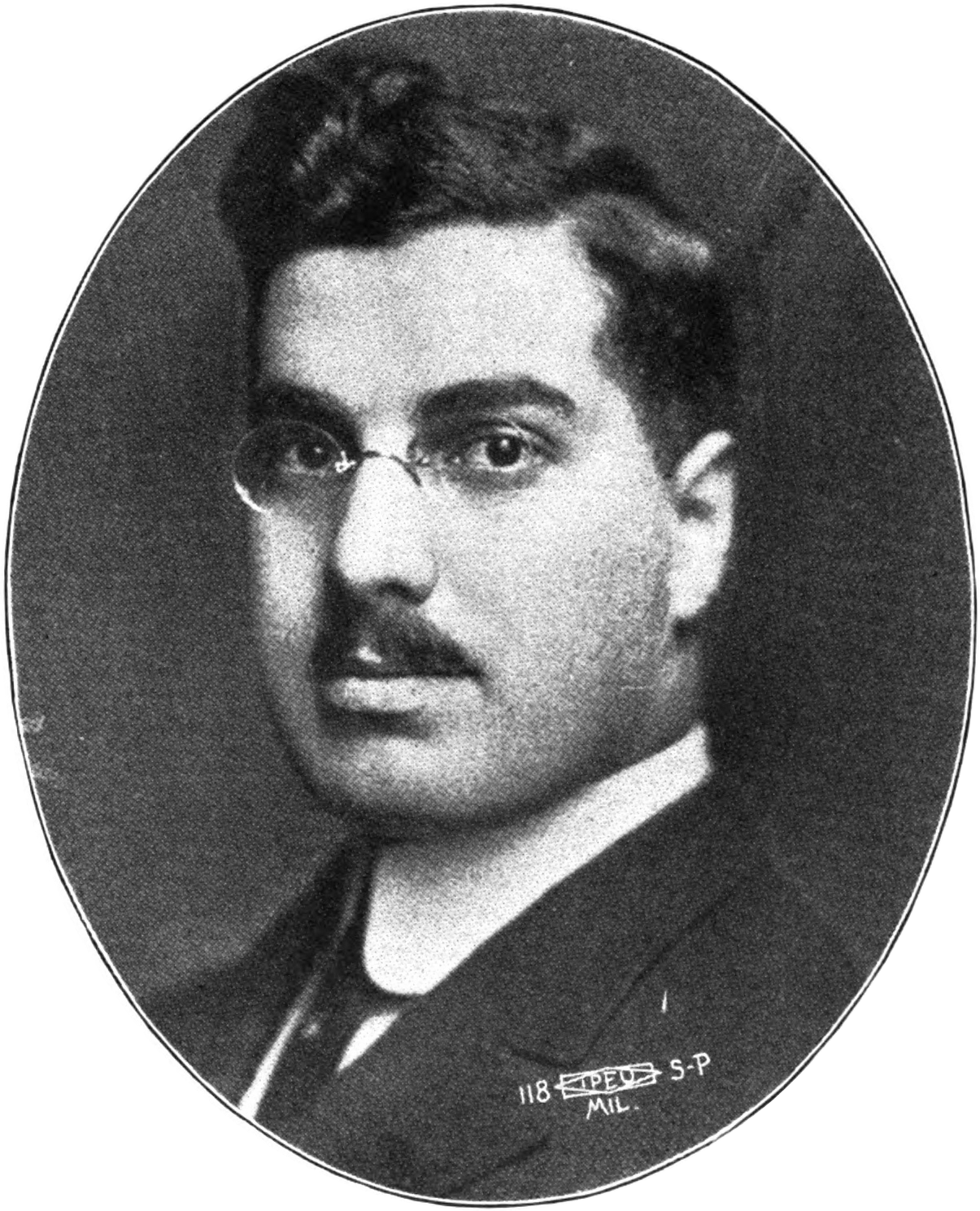
- Padway c. 1924

Judge of the Milwaukee Civil Court
- In office January 1, 1926 – December 1, 1926
- Appointed by: John J. Blaine
- In office January 1, 1924 – January 5, 1925
- Appointed by: John J. Blaine

Member of the Wisconsin Senate from the 6th district
- In office January 5, 1925 – January 1, 1926
- Preceded by: Joseph J. Hirsch
- Succeeded by: Alex C. Ruffing

Personal details
- Born: July 25, 1891 Leeds, England
- Died: October 9, 1947 (aged 56) San Francisco, California, U.S.
- Party: Socialist (before 1927); Progressive (after 1927)
- Occupation: Labor lawyer; Politician

Joseph Arthur Padway (July 25, 1891 – October 9, 1947) was an American labor lawyer and politician.

== Biography ==
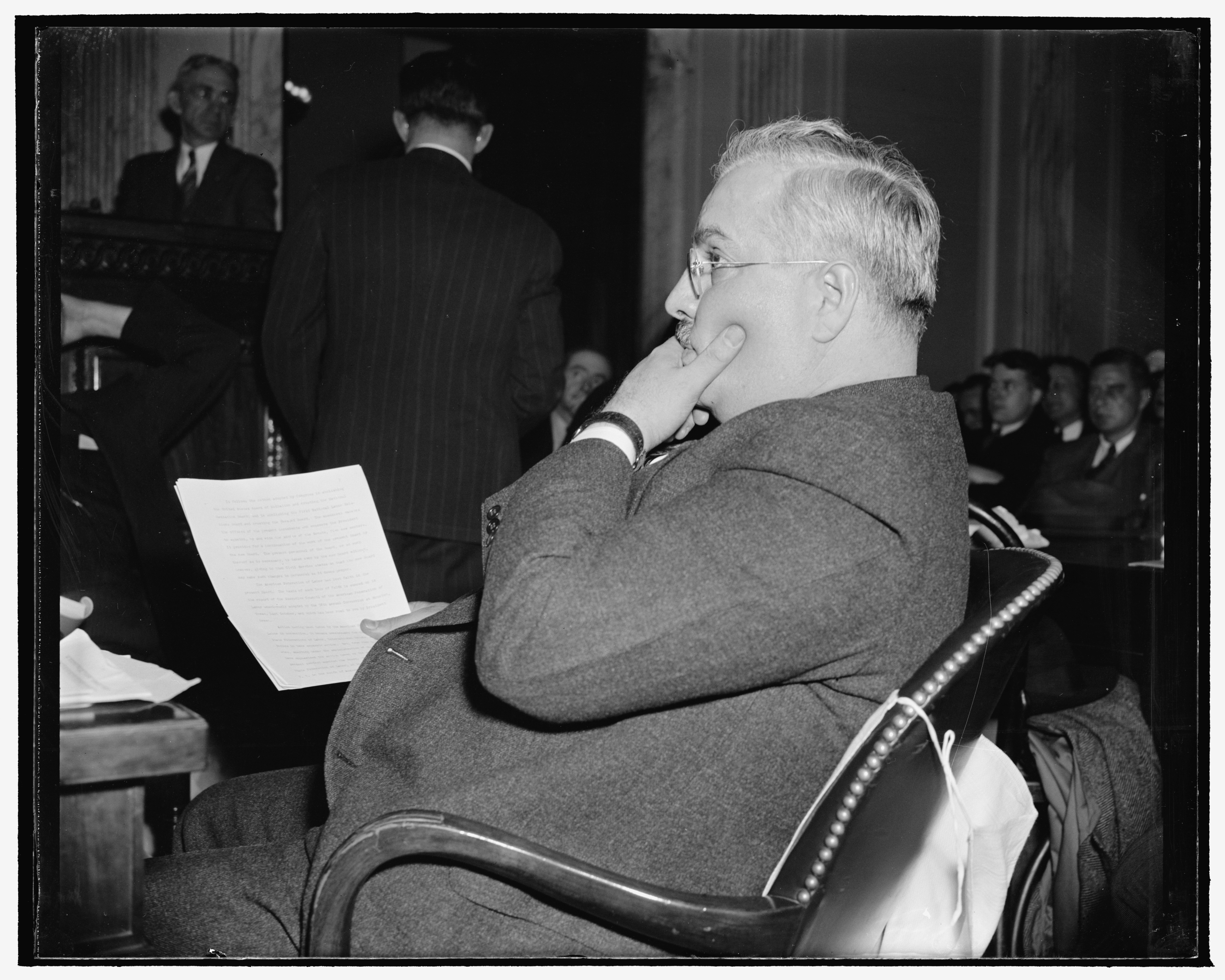
Padway speaking before the Senate Labor Committee, 1939

Born in Leeds, England on July 25, 1891, but went to Milwaukee in 1905. Admitted to the State Bar of Wisconsin in 1912. He was appointed legal counsel for the Wisconsin State Federation of Labor three years later. He married Lydia Paetow on March 9, 1912. He was elected to the Wisconsin State Senate on the Socialist Party of America ticket and served in the 1925 session of the Wisconsin State Legislature. Padway was twice appointed to the Milwaukee civil court bench (1924, 1926). After 1927 he was associated with the Progressive Republicans in Wisconsin.

Padway played a major role in shaping Wisconsin labor legislation between 1915 and 1935. Upon his appointment as the first general counsel of the American Federation of Labor, he moved to Washington where he served until his death. In this capacity, he successfully defended the constitutionality of the National Labor Relations Act (Wagner Act) before the United States Supreme Court. He died in San Francisco, California on October 9, 1947.
