= Jacob Rummel =

American politician (1857–1928)

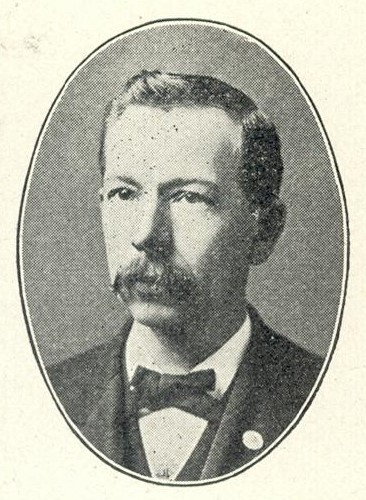
- Rummel c. 1905

Member of the Wisconsin Senate from the 6th district
- In office January 2, 1905 – January 4, 1909
- Preceded by: Rip Reukema
- Succeeded by: Winfield Gaylord

Personal details
- Born: April 17, 1857 Washington County, Wisconsin, U.S.
- Died: March 26, 1928 (aged 70) Milwaukee, Wisconsin, U.S.
- Resting place: Forest Home Cemetery, Milwaukee
- Party: Socialist
- Occupation: Cigarmaker

Jacob Rummel (April 17, 1857 – March 26, 1928) was an American cigarmaker and Socialist politician from Milwaukee, Wisconsin. He served four years as a member of the Wisconsin Senate, representing Wisconsin's 6th Senate district from 1905 to 1909. He also served as a member of the Milwaukee Common Council.

== Background ==
Rummel was born on April 17, 1857, in Washington County, Wisconsin, where he attended public schools. He came to Milwaukee in 1872 and entered college, and learned the cigar trade, becoming foreman for Williams & Brendle Cigar Mfg. Co. He died at his home in Milwaukee in 1928.

== Elective office ==
He was elected state senator on the Social Democratic ticket in 1904 from the Sixth district (9th, 10th, 19th, 20th and 22nd wards of the City of Milwaukee), a seat held by Republican Rip Reukema (who did not seek re-election). Rummel received 5,848 votes against 5,801 for August J. Langhoff (Republican), and 3,127 for Gottfried Hergarten (Democrat).

He did not run for re-election in 1908, and was succeeded by fellow Socialist Winfield Gaylord.

== See also ==
- Politics of the United States
