= Horace Chase =

American politician (1810–1886)

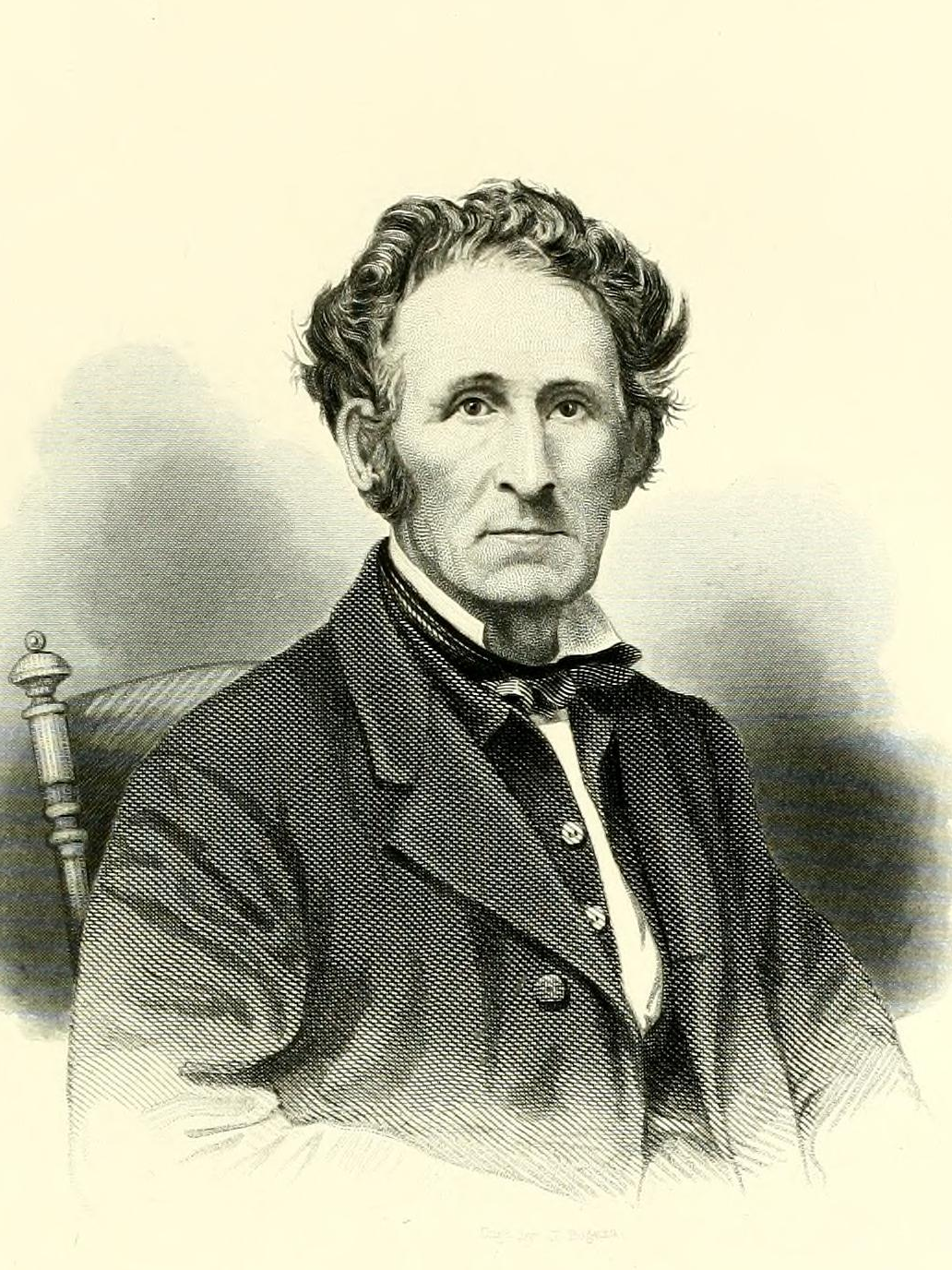
- From History of Milwaukee from its first settlement to the year 1895 (1895)

14th Mayor of Milwaukee, Wisconsin
- In office April 1862 – April 1863
- Preceded by: James S. Brown
- Succeeded by: Edward O'Neill

Member of the Wisconsin State Assembly from the Milwaukee 6th district
- In office June 5, 1848 – January 1, 1849
- Preceded by: Position established
- Succeeded by: Enoch Chase

Personal details
- Born: December 25, 1810 Derby, Vermont, U.S.
- Died: September 1, 1886 (aged 75) Milwaukee, Wisconsin, U.S.
- Resting place: Forest Home Cemetery, Milwaukee, Wisconsin
- Party: Democratic
- Spouses: Sarah Ann Gray (m. 1837; died 1852); Mary H. Davis (m. 1858; died 1882)
- Children: Frances Chase; (b. 1846; died 1846)
- Relatives: Enoch Chase (brother)

Horace B. Chase (December 25, 1810 – September 1, 1886) was an American Democratic politician and Milwaukee County pioneer. He was the 14th mayor of Milwaukee, Wisconsin, (1862) and represented southern Milwaukee County in the Wisconsin State Assembly during the 1st Wisconsin Legislature (1848).

== Biography ==
Chase was born in Vermont, on Christmas Day of 1810 and lived near Derby, Vermont. One of Milwaukee's pioneers, he first arrived in Milwaukee in December 1834, left for Chicago, and returned to settle in Milwaukee in March 1835. Later in that year, Chase was the clerk of the first election in ever held in Milwaukee. He was an alderman, county supervisor, served in the first Wisconsin Constitutional Convention of 1846, and served as mayor of Milwaukee in 1862. He also served in the first Wisconsin State Assembly in 1848.

Chase died on September 1, 1886, at his home in Milwaukee, after an illness of several months. His body was interred at Milwaukee's historic Forest Home Cemetery. Near the time of his death, he was referred to as the oldest remaining settler of Milwaukee.

Wisconsin State Assembly
New state government	Member of the Wisconsin State Assembly from the Milwaukee 6th district 1848	Succeeded by Enoch Chase
Political offices
Preceded by James S. Brown	Mayor of Milwaukee, Wisconsin; 1862	Succeeded by Edward O'Neill
