= Oscar Altpeter =

American politician

Oscar Altpeter (June 1, 1857 - November 23, 1935) was an American maltster who served as an alderman from Milwaukee, and for four years as a Democratic member of the Wisconsin State Senate's Sixth District (2nd, 4th, 6th & 9th Wards of the City of Milwaukee, Wisconsin.

== Background ==
Altpeter was born in the Sixth Ward of Milwaukee on June 1, 1857, the son of Phillip Altpeter, an immigrant from Germany who was one of the first brewers in Milwaukee; was educated in public schools and the German-English Academy; and graduated from the Spencerian Business College in 1875. He became a maltster.

== Public office ==
Altpeter was elected as alderman from the Sixth Ward for terms from 1885–1889, and was a member of the board of trustees of the Milwaukee Public Museum in 1888–89.

He was elected state senator in 1892 to succeed fellow Democrat Herman Kroeger, with 6,119 votes to 5,506 for Republican H. J. Sullivan, 312 for Populist William H. Gladding and 82 for Prohibitionist for Silas Chapman. He was assigned to the standing committee on finance, banks and insurance. He was not a candidate in 1896, and was succeeded by Republican William Devos.

He was again elected as an alderman at large from 1901 to 1906 and from 1912 to 1916.

== Private life ==
Altpeter was one of thirteen children and his parents names were Phillip and Caroline. His father founded the Northwestern Brewery in Milwaukee, of which himself and his brothers Gustav and Louis were employed. In 1896 he founded a brewery of his own, although it ceased operations after a year.

Altpeter was one of the founders of the English Lutheran Church of the Reformation in Milwaukee. He died on November 23, 1935, at his home, and was survived by his wife Margaret, two daughters and two sons.
