= Enoch Chase =

19th century American politician

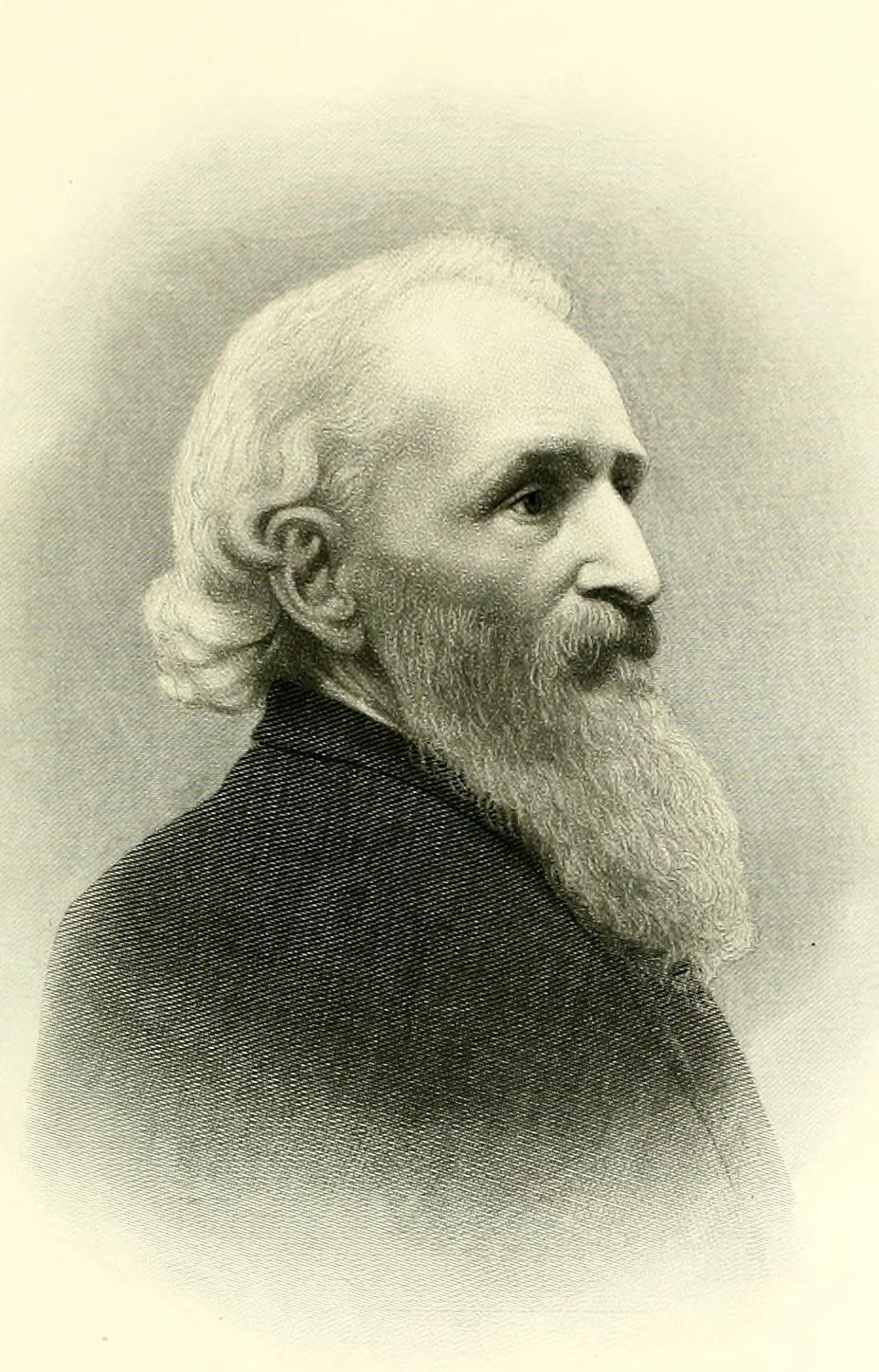
- Engraving by John Sartain, from History of Milwaukee from its first settlement to the year 1895 (1895)

Member of the Wisconsin Senate from the 6th district
- In office January 2, 1882 – January 5, 1885
- Preceded by: George Howard Paul
- Succeeded by: Julius Wechselberg

Member of the Wisconsin State Assembly
- In office January 3, 1870 – January 2, 1871
- Preceded by: Henry Roethe
- Succeeded by: Valentin Knœll
- Constituency: Milwaukee 9th district
- In office January 3, 1853 – January 2, 1854
- Preceded by: William Beck
- Succeeded by: Peter Lavies
- Constituency: Milwaukee 7th district
- In office January 1, 1849 – January 5, 1852
- Preceded by: Horace Chase
- Succeeded by: Edward Hasse
- Constituency: Milwaukee 6th district

Personal details
- Born: January 16, 1809 Derby, Vermont, U.S.
- Died: August 23, 1892 (aged 83) Milwaukee, Wisconsin, U.S.
- Resting place: Forest Home Cemetery, Milwaukee, Wisconsin
- Party: Democratic; Whig (before 1853)
- Spouses: Julia Ann Ellsworth (died 1837); Nancy Marguerite Bromley (m. 1837–1892)
- Children: with Julia Ellsworth; Julia Ann (Brown)^{(b. 1836; died 1901)}; with Nancy Bromley; George Horace Chase^{(b. 1838; died 1922)}; Lucien B. Chase^{(b. 1841; died 1863)}; Hannah W. (Burrell)^{(b. 1843; died 1904)}; Lilias Chase^{(b. 1846; died 1847)}; Ann Follansbee (Sweet)^{(b. 1848; died 1891)}; Nell Chase^{(b. 1851; died 1851)}; Enoch Chase^{(b. 1852; died 1854)}; Clarence G. Chase^{(b. 1855; died 1899)}; Horace Chase^{(b. 1857; died 1860)}; Clifford C. Chase^{(b. 1859; died 1927)}
- Relatives: Horace Chase (brother)
- Education: Bowdoin College; Dartmouth College

Enoch Colby Chase (January 16, 1809 – August 23, 1892) was an American physician, businessman, and Milwaukee County pioneer. He served three years in the Wisconsin State Senate and five terms in the State Assembly, representing southern Milwaukee County.

== Early life ==
Chase was born in Derby, Vermont, and attended the school of medicine at Bowdoin College before graduating from Dartmouth College as a Doctor of Medicine in 1831. After living for a time in Coldwater, Michigan, and Chicago, Illinois, he moved to Wisconsin in 1835, settling in Milwaukee County, as a farmer and a manufacturer of brick and glassware.

== Political career ==
Chase served in various political positions in Wisconsin. He was a member of the Assembly three times, in 1852 and 1853 as a Whig and in 1870 as a Democrat. During his first term he was the Whig candidate for Speaker of the House but was defeated by Moses M. Strong. He represented the southern half of Milwaukee County in the Wisconsin State Senate from 1882 through 1884. Chase, originally a Whig, ran as an independent in 1853 against Democrat Francis Ward and later was himself elected as a Democrat. Chase died in Milwaukee, Wisconsin, on August 23, 1892.

== Personal life and family ==
Horace Chase, the 14th mayor of Milwaukee, was a younger brother of Enoch Chase.

Enoch Chase married twice and had at least 11 children, though four died in childhood. His son Lucian served in the 24th Wisconsin Infantry Regiment during the American Civil War, and died of disease after the Battle of Perryville.

== Electoral history ==
=== Wisconsin Assembly (1851) ===
Wisconsin Assembly, Milwaukee 6th District Election, 1851
Party	Candidate	Votes	%	±%
General Election, November 4, 1851
Democratic	Edward Hasse	198	40.99%	
Free Soil	Morgan L. Burdick	151	31.27%	
Whig	Enoch Chase (incumbent)	134	27.74%	
Total votes		483	100.0%	
Democratic gain from Whig				

=== Wisconsin Assembly (1852) ===
Wisconsin Assembly, Milwaukee 7th District Election, 1852
Party	Candidate	Votes	%	±%
General Election, November 2, 1852
Whig	Enoch Chase	243	44.75%	
Democratic	Francis Ward	215	39.59%	
Free Soil	Mr. Johnson	85	15.65%	
Total votes		543	100.0%	
Whig gain from Democratic				

=== Wisconsin Assembly (1869) ===
Wisconsin Assembly, Milwaukee 9th District Election, 1869
Party	Candidate	Votes	%	±%
General Election, November 2, 1869
Democratic	Enoch Chase	742	62.04%	
Republican	Andrew Douglas	454	37.96%	
Total votes		1,196	100.0%	
Democratic hold				

=== Wisconsin Senate (1881) ===
Wisconsin Senate, 6th District Election, 1881
Party	Candidate	Votes	%	±%
General Election, November 8, 1881
Democratic	Enoch Chase	2,495	53.30%	
Republican	Peter Barth	2,092	44.69%	
Greenback	Newell Daniels	94	2.01%	
Total votes		4,681	100.0%	
Democratic hold				

Wisconsin State Assembly
Preceded by Horace Chase	Member of the Wisconsin State Assembly from the Milwaukee 6th district January 1, 1849 – January 5, 1852	Succeeded by Edward Hasse
Preceded by William Beck	Member of the Wisconsin State Assembly from the Milwaukee 7th district January 3, 1853 – January 2, 1854	Succeeded by Peter Lavies
Preceded by Henry Roethe	Member of the Wisconsin State Assembly from the Milwaukee 9th district January 3, 1870 – January 2, 1871	Succeeded by Valentin Knoll
Wisconsin Senate
Preceded by George Howard Paul	Member of the Wisconsin Senate from the 6th district January 2, 1882 – January 5, 1885	Succeeded by Julius Wechselberg
