= 1906 Wisconsin gubernatorial election =

- November 6, 1906
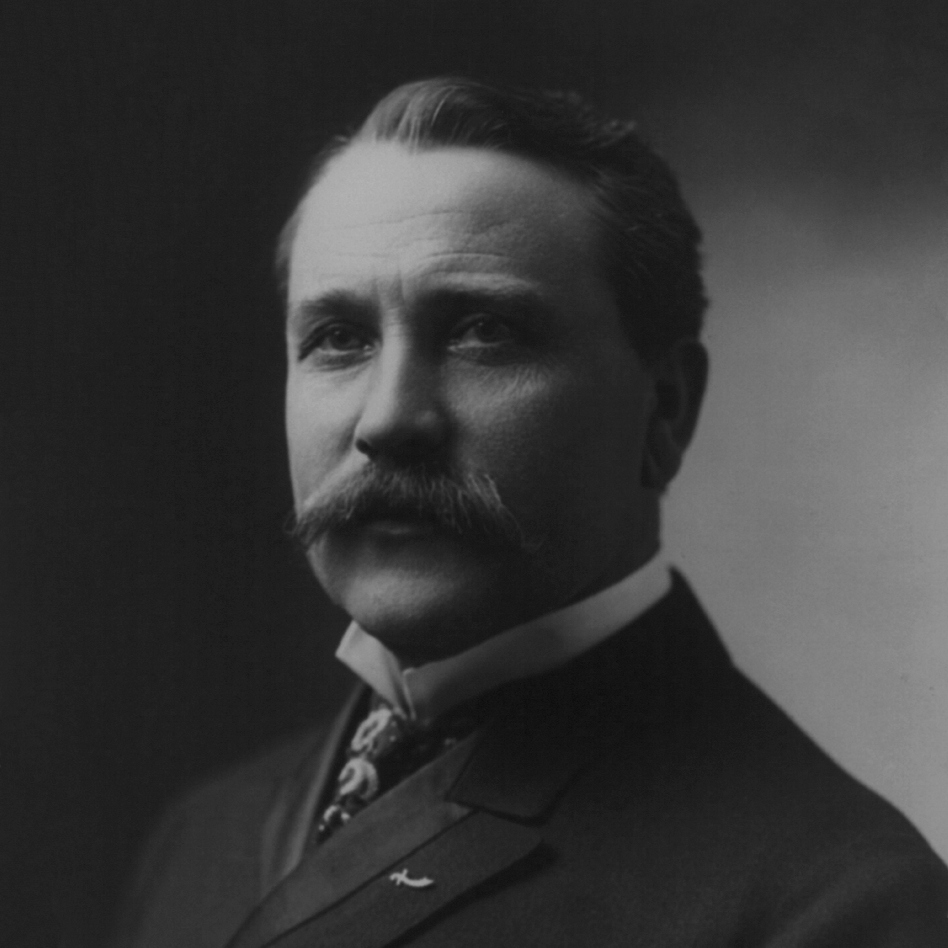

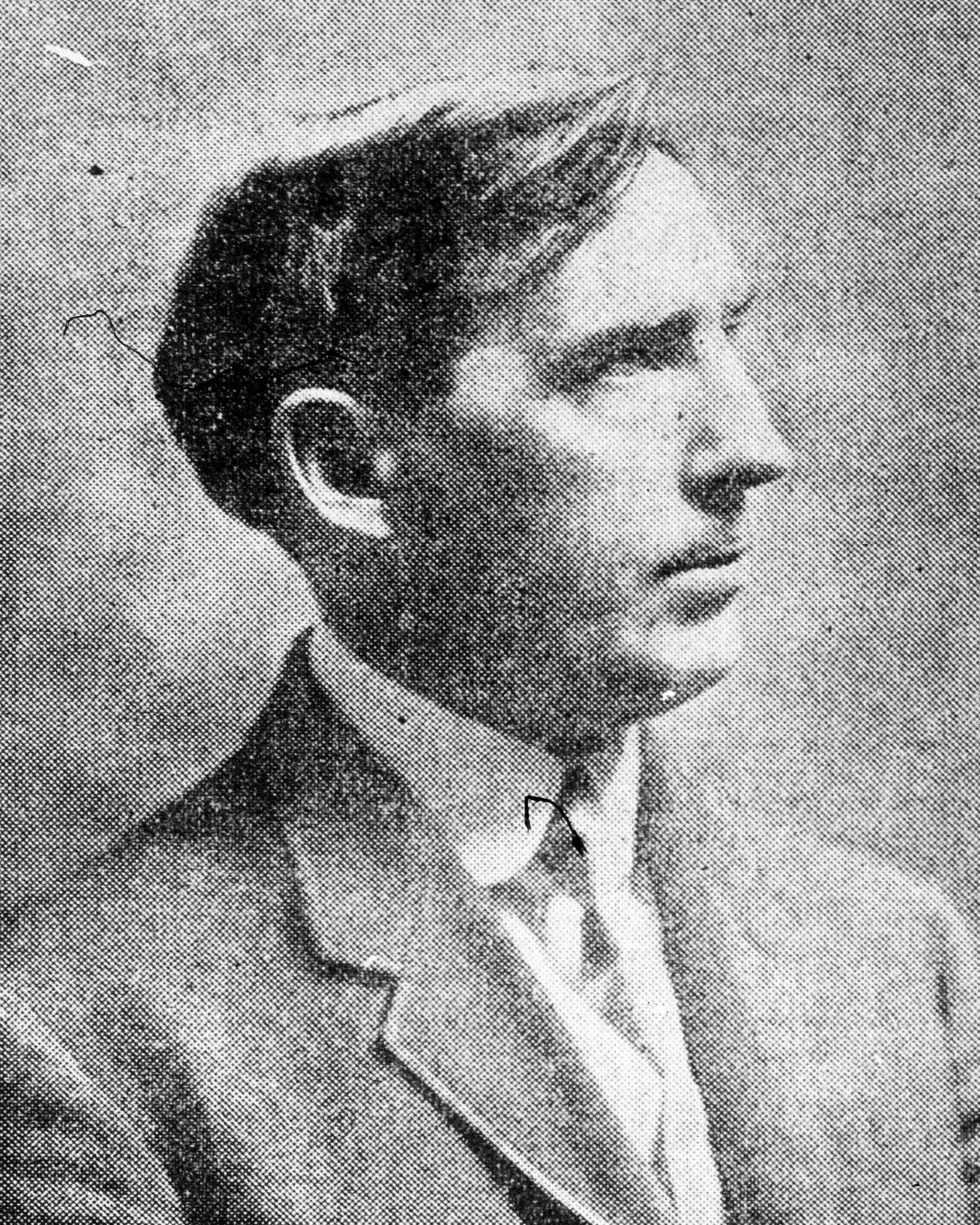

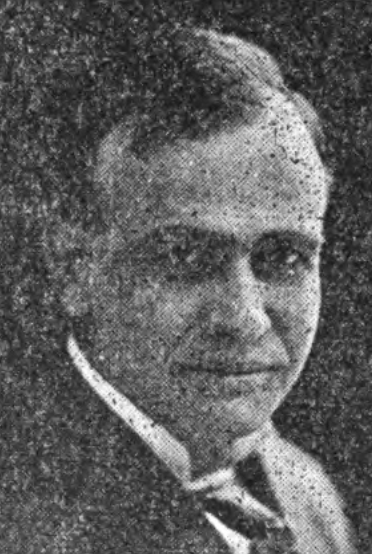
Nominee	James O. Davidson	John A. Aylward	Winfield R. Gaylord
Party	Republican	Democratic	Social-Democratic
Popular vote	183,558	103,311	24,437
Percentage	57.36%	32.28%	7.64%
- County results Davidson: 40–50% 50–60% 60–70% 70–80% 80–90% Aylward: 40–50% 50–60% 60–70%
Governor before election
James O. Davidson
Republican
Elected Governor
James O. Davidson
Republican

The 1906 Wisconsin gubernatorial election was held on November 6, 1906. Primary elections were held on September 4, 1906.

Incumbent Republican Governor James O. Davidson won re-election, defeating Democratic nominee John A. Aylward and Social-Democratic nominee Winfield R. Gaylord, with 57.39% of the vote.

== Primary election ==
Wisconsin voters passed a constitutional amendment in the 1904 general election to implement primary elections for nominations. The first direct primary took place on September 4, 1906.

=== Republican party ===
==== Candidates ====
- James O. Davidson, acting governor Governor
- Irvine Lenroot, incumbent Speaker of the Wisconsin State Assembly

==== Results ====
Republican primary results
Party	Candidate	Votes	%
Republican	James O. Davidson (incumbent)	109,583	64.15%
Republican	Irvine L. Lenroot	61,178	35.82%
Republican	Scattering	53	0.03%
Total votes		170,814	100.00%

=== Democratic party ===
==== Candidates ====
- John A. Aylward, Democratic nominee for Wisconsin's 2nd congressional district in 1900
- Ernst Merton, incumbent State Senator

==== Results ====
Democratic primary results
Party	Candidate	Votes	%
Democratic	John A. Aylward	21,470	71.94%
Democratic	Ernst Merton	8,278	27.74%
Democratic	Scattering	96	0.32%
Total votes		29,844	100.00%

=== Social Democratic party ===
==== Candidates ====
- Winfield R. Gaylord, Social-Democratic nominee for Wisconsin's 4th congressional district in 1904

==== Results ====
Social-Democratic primary results
Party	Candidate	Votes	%
Social Democratic	Winfield R. Gaylord	4,075	99.61%
Social Democratic	Scattering	16	0.39%
Total votes		4,091	100.00%

=== Prohibition party ===
==== Candidates ====
- Ephraim Llewellyn Eaton, Prohibition nominee for Wisconsin's 4th congressional district in 1892

==== Results ====
Prohibition primary results
Party	Candidate	Votes	%
Prohibition	Ephraim L. Eaton	1,573	98.56%
Prohibition	Scattering	23	1.44%
Total votes		1,596	100.00%

== General election ==
=== Results ===
1906 Wisconsin gubernatorial election (Note: One must exercise caution using the Blue Book as a source for Wisconsin election data for the period of 1890-1920 as it was unreliable during this period. In this case, the Blue Book's totals for all candidates are incorrect and it also has numerous mistakes in the county figures.)
Party	Candidate	Votes	%	±%
Republican	James O. Davidson (incumbent)	183,558	57.36%	+6.81%
Democratic	John A. Aylward	103,311	32.28%	−6.93%
Social Democratic	Winfield R. Gaylord	24,437	7.64%	+2.11%
Prohibition	Ephraim L. Eaton	8,211	2.57%	+0.62%
Socialist Labor	Ole T. Rosaas	455	0.14%	+0.09%
	Scattering	31	0.01%	
Majority		80,247	25.08%	
Total votes		320,003	100.00%	
Republican hold		Swing	+13.74%	

=== Results by county ===
County	James O. Davidson Republican		John A. Aylward Democratic		Winfield R. Gaylord Social-Democratic		Ephraim L. Eaton Prohibition		Ole T. Rosaas Socialist Labor		Margin		Total votes cast
County	#	%	#	%	#	%	#	%	#	%	#	%	Total votes cast
Adams	699	74.52%	212	22.60%	9	0.96%	16	1.71%	0	0.00%	487	51.92%	938 (Note: Includes 2 Scattering votes)
Ashland	1,796	62.38%	768	26.68%	229	7.95%	82	2.85%	3	0.10%	1,028	35.71%	2,879 (Note: Includes 1 Scattering vote)
Barron	1,797	75.35%	303	12.70%	123	5.16%	153	6.42%	7	0.29%	1,494	62.64%	2,385
Bayfield	1,356	81.54%	159	9.56%	92	5.53%	52	3.13%	4	0.24%	1,197	71.98%	1,663
Brown	3,314	60.38%	1,854	33.78%	224	4.08%	91	1.66%	6	0.11%	1,460	26.60%	5,489
Buffalo	1,449	67.84%	637	29.82%	9	0.42%	39	1.83%	2	0.09%	812	38.01%	2,136
Burnett	1,040	87.03%	59	4.94%	38	3.18%	48	4.02%	10	0.84%	981	82.09%	1,195
Calumet	1,143	44.91%	1,268	49.82%	99	3.89%	35	1.38%	0	0.00%	-125	-4.91%	2,545
Chippewa	2,343	60.08%	1,406	36.05%	49	1.26%	99	2.54%	3	0.08%	937	24.03%	3,900
Clark	2,462	75.54%	672	20.62%	34	1.04%	87	2.67%	4	0.12%	1,790	54.92%	3,259
Columbia	3,200	66.57%	1,371	28.52%	102	2.12%	131	2.73%	3	0.06%	1,829	38.05%	4,807
Crawford	1,710	57.69%	1,177	39.71%	42	1.42%	35	1.18%	0	0.00%	533	17.98%	2,964
Dane	6,843	54.66%	5,120	40.89%	172	1.37%	380	3.04%	5	0.04%	1,723	13.76%	12,520
Dodge	2,749	35.94%	4,734	61.90%	47	0.61%	116	1.52%	2	0.03%	-1,985	-25.95%	7,648
Door	1,699	82.64%	277	13.47%	41	1.99%	37	1.80%	2	0.10%	1,422	69.16%	2,056
Douglas	2,391	62.14%	987	25.65%	333	8.65%	111	2.88%	26	0.68%	1,404	36.49%	3,848
Dunn	1,874	83.47%	258	11.49%	56	2.49%	56	2.49%	1	0.04%	1,616	71.98%	2,245
Eau Claire	2,837	68.39%	1,066	25.70%	123	2.97%	116	2.80%	4	0.10%	1,771	42.70%	4,148
Florence	335	84.81%	55	13.92%	2	0.51%	3	0.76%	0	0.00%	280	70.89%	395
Fond du Lac	4,073	49.76%	3,779	46.16%	124	1.51%	205	2.50%	5	0.06%	294	3.59%	8,186
Forest	884	83.79%	113	10.71%	26	2.46%	26	2.46%	6	0.57%	771	73.08%	1.055
Grant	4,249	62.39%	2,294	33.69%	40	0.59%	222	3.26%	3	0.04%	1,955	28.71%	6,810
Green	1,905	58.31%	1,112	34.04%	113	3.46%	135	4.13%	1	0.03%	793	24.27%	3,267
Green Lake	1,716	55.11%	1,302	41.81%	31	1.00%	65	2.09%	0	0.00%	414	13.29%	3,114
Iowa	2,635	61.78%	1,472	34.51%	13	0.30%	145	3.40%	0	0.00%	1,163	27.27%	4,265
Iron	1,025	77.36%	221	16.68%	50	3.77%	26	1.96%	3	0.23%	804	60.68%	1,325
Jackson	1,871	83.16%	323	14.36%	13	0.58%	43	1.91%	0	0.00%	1,548	68.80%	2,250
Jefferson	2,622	43.37%	3,217	53.21%	85	1.41%	120	1.98%	2	0.03%	-595	-9.84%	6,046
Juneau	2,406	67.08%	1,100	30.67%	27	0.75%	51	1.42%	2	0.06%	1,306	36.41%	3,587
Kenosha	2,090	49.69%	1,635	38.87%	284	6.75%	187	4.45%	10	0.24%	455	10.82%	4,206
Kewaunee	1,362	51.26%	1,194	44.94%	69	2.60%	29	1.09%	3	0.11%	168	6.32%	2,657
La Crosse	4,259	59.39%	2,584	36.03%	129	1.80%	196	2.73%	3	0.04%	1,675	23.36%	7,171
Lafayette	2,238	58.19%	1,526	39.68%	18	0.47%	63	1.64%	1	0.03%	712	18.51%	3,846
Langlade	1,365	51.10%	1,235	46.24%	26	0.97%	43	1.61%	2	0.07%	130	4.87%	2,671
Lincoln	1,652	58.62%	1,047	37.15%	68	2.41%	51	1.81%	0	0.00%	605	21.47%	2,818
Manitowoc	3,486	48.38%	2,974	41.28%	668	9.27%	75	1.04%	2	0.03%	512	7.11%	7,205
Marathon	3,695	49.70%	3,435	46.20%	150	2.02%	138	1.86%	17	0.23%	260	3.50%	7,435
Marinette	2,658	67.58%	1,006	25.58%	107	2.72%	161	4.09%	1	0.03%	1,652	42.00%	3,933
Marquette	1,359	60.48%	812	36.14%	13	0.58%	63	2.80%	0	0.00%	547	24.34%	2,247
Milwaukee	24,521	44.13%	12,856	23.13%	17,031	30.65%	1,039	1.87%	124	0.22%	7,490 (Note: Davidson's margin over Gaylord)	13.48%	55,571
Monroe	2,334	64.48%	1,156	31.93%	40	1.10%	87	2.40%	2	0.06%	1,178	32.54%	3,620
Oconto	1,967	66.03%	870	29.20%	80	2.69%	61	2.05%	1	0.03%	1,097	36.82%	2,979
Oneida	1,197	59.73%	613	30.59%	146	7.29%	48	2.40%	0	0.00%	584	29.14%	2,004
Outagamie	3,794	53.83%	3,026	42.93%	76	1.08%	147	2.09%	5	0.07%	768	10.90%	7,048
Ozaukee	1,012	36.21%	1,664	59.53%	90	3.22%	29	1.04%	0	0.00%	-652	-23.33%	2,795
Pepin	657	68.94%	261	27.39%	4	0.42%	31	3.25%	0	0.00%	396	41.55%	953
Pierce	1,880	79.73%	342	14.50%	44	1.87%	89	3.77%	3	0.13%	1,538	65.22%	2,358
Polk	1,566	78.93%	182	9.17%	166	8.37%	61	3.07%	7	0.35%	1,384	69.76%	1,984
Portage	2,265	55.58%	1,675	41.10%	36	0.88%	98	2.40%	1	0.02%	590	14.48%	4,075
Price	1,512	67.56%	527	23.55%	105	4.69%	87	3.89%	5	0.22%	985	44.01%	2,238
Racine	3,547	51.89%	2,065	30.21%	891	13.03%	242	3.54%	90	1.32%	1,482	21.68%	6,836
Richland	2,070	61.59%	1,035	30.79%	45	1.34%	208	6.19%	3	0.09%	1,035	30.79%	3,361
Rock	3,917	68.67%	1,321	23.16%	153	2.68%	299	5.24%	13	0.23%	2,596	45.51%	5,704
Rusk	1,049	82.47%	151	11.87%	31	2.44%	36	2.83%	5	0.39%	898	70.60%	1,272
Sauk	3,102	62.83%	1,509	30.57%	22	0.45%	302	6.12%	1	0.02%	1,593	32.27%	4,937
Sawyer	735	74.62%	229	23.25%	10	1.02%	11	1.12%	0	0.00%	506	51.37%	985
Shawano	1,850	69.21%	738	27.61%	38	1.42%	45	1.68%	2	0.07%	1,112	41.60%	2,673
Sheboygan	4,151	50.45%	3,366	40.91%	502	6.10%	203	2.47%	6	0.07%	785	9.54%	8,228
St. Croix	2,354	61.62%	1,287	33.69%	90	2.36%	86	2.25%	3	0.08%	1,067	27.93%	3,820
Taylor	1,237	60.55%	707	34.61%	60	2.94%	36	1.76%	3	0.15%	530	25.94%	2,043
Trempealeau	1,901	77.09%	476	19.30%	9	0.36%	75	3.04%	2	0.08%	1,425	57.79%	2,466 (Note: Includes 3 Scattering votes)
Vernon	3,118	79.91%	638	16.35%	19	0.49%	126	3.23%	0	0.00%	2,480	63.56%	3,902
Vilas	682	75.11%	187	20.59%	25	2.75%	12	1.32%	2	0.22%	495	54.52%	908
Walworth	2,858	69.72%	986	24.05%	61	1.49%	191	4.66%	3	0.07%	1,872	45.67%	4,099
Washburn	900	78.13%	184	15.97%	45	3.91%	21	1.82%	2	0.17%	716	62.15%	1,152
Washington	1,972	43.84%	2,346	52.16%	130	2.89%	48	1.07%	1	0.02%	-374	-8.31%	4,498
Waukesha	3,912	58.69%	2,431	36.47%	130	1.95%	192	2.88%	1	0.02%	1,481	22.22%	6,666
Waupaca	2,683	76.14%	607	17.22%	90	2.55%	137	3.89%	2	0.06%	2,076	58.91%	3,524 (Note: Includes 5 Scattering votes)
Waushara	2,074	87.00%	212	8.89%	17	0.71%	78	3.27%	1	0.04%	1,862	78.10%	2,384
Winnebago	5,471	57.91%	3,469	36.72%	218	2.31%	271	2.87%	19	0.20%	2,002	21.19%	9,448
Wood	2,683	61.56%	1,431	32.84%	155	3.56%	84	1.93%	5	0.11%	1,252	28.73%	4,358
Total	183,558	57.36%	103,311	39.28%	24,437	7.64%	8,211	2.57%	455	0.14%	80,247	25.08%	320,003

==== Counties that flipped from Democratic to Republican ====
- Crawford
- Door
- Florence
- Fond du Lac
- Green Lake
- Kewaunee
- Manitowoc
- Marquette
- Winnebago

== Bibliography ==
- Glashan, Roy R. (1979). American Governors and Gubernatorial Elections, 1775-1978. Meckler Books. ISBN 0-930466-17-9.
- Gubernatorial Elections, 1787-1997. Washington, D.C.: Congressional Quarterly Inc. 1998. ISBN 1-56802-396-0.
- Beck, J. D., ed. (1907). The Blue Book of the state of Wisconsin. Madison, Wisconsin: Democrat Printing Co., State Printer.
