= North Grant Boulevard Historic District =

Historic district in Wisconsin, United States

- U.S. National Register of Historic Places
- U.S. Historic district
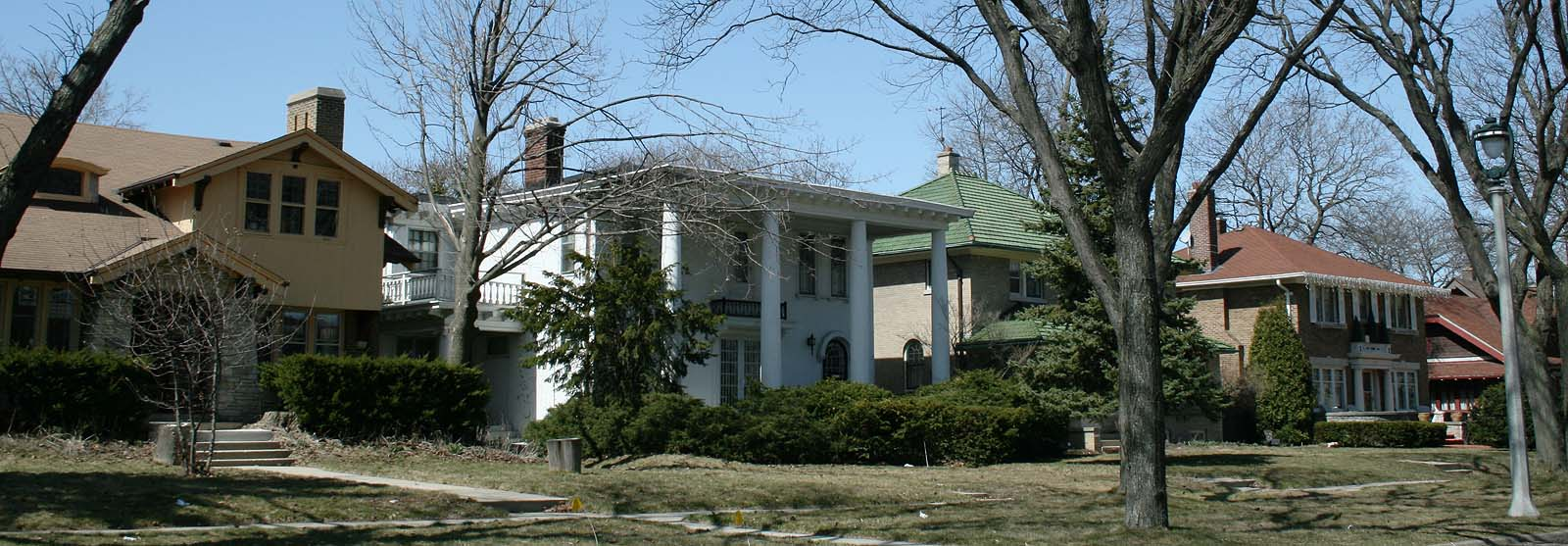
- North Grant Boulevard Historic District

- Location within Wisconsin
- Location: Milwaukee, Wisconsin
- Coordinates: 43.0661°N 87.96582°W
- NRHP reference No.: 95000290
- Added to NRHP: March 23, 1995

The North Grant Boulevard Historic District is a neighborhood of stylish houses built on large lots from 1913 to 1931 in Milwaukee, Wisconsin, United States. It was added to the National Register of Historic Places in 1995.

== History ==
Charles James was the English immigrant who built Milwaukee's first frame store and a home and warehouse for Solomon Juneau. In 1839 he bought the 160-acre parcel which now holds the district and built a prominent farm there, with his house and the surrounding five acres framed in a horseshoe of evergreen trees. He called his farm "The Cedars," and it was noted for growing 200 varieties of roses, tulips, peonies, apples, potatoes and wild plums.

By 1890 Milwaukee's city limits had reached Charles James' farm. The growing city was developing parks for its citizens, and bought the land that is now Sherman Park to the north for that purpose. With that promise, real estate brokers Julius Wechselberg, a former member of the Wisconsin State Senate, and his brother Ludwig bought 100 acres of James' farm for residential development between 1890 and 1896. In 1896 Ludwig, Henry C. Paine, and Benjamin Weil incorporated the Boulevard Park Land Company, but not much happened there for years, perhaps because the land was still out of town, not served by public transport. Finally in 1909 the company bought the last bit of James' farm and began to plat the parcels for development.

The company's target was high-class buyers, so it platted the land in rather large lots 50 feet wide and from 120 to 165 feet deep. The company also asked the city to officially designate Grant street a "boulevard," which gave it prestige by limiting its use by wagons, trucks and sleighs. Until then Milwaukee had typically granted this designation to broad streets linking parks with the two roadways separated by a landscaped median. Grant would be broad, but it did not link parks, and instead of the median down the middle, it would have a single roadway down the center, with a broad landscaped strip down each side. The boulevard designation was finally granted in 1917. Deed restrictions within the neighborhood required single-family homes, required that they have a minimum value of $3,500 initially, and required that houses be set back about 80 feet from the street to give an estate-like feel. Deed restrictions also forbade the sale of alcohol, livery stables, and "any business that would be detrimental to the interests of a first class residential neighborhood."

Construction of homes began around 1913 and finished in 1931. 119 of the structures now contribute to the historic district. Here are examples of the various styles:

- The Walter J. Buckley house at 2370 N. Grant Boulevard is a 2.5-story English-influenced Arts and Crafts-style house designed by Charles Valentine and built in 1913, stucco-clad on a brick base with some half-timbering. Buckley was secretary-treasurer of the T.L. Smith Co., which built concrete-mixing and stone-crushing equipment. Walter Mockler bought the house in 1918; he was vice-president of the A. George Schulz Co., which made paper boxes. Erving Koester, a lawyer, bought the house in 1923 and lived there into the 1970s.
- The George Seifert house at 2416 N Grant Boulevard is a 2-story Arts and Crafts-style house designed by Frank Drolshagen and built in 1915, with a brick-clad first story, stucco-clad second story, jerkin-head gables framing the upper windows, and a front porch with brick piers supporting a flared gable. Seifert was a salesman.
- The George E. Martin house at 2417 N. Grant Boulevard is a 2.5-story American Foursquare-style house with Prairie School influences designed by Gustav Dick. Martin was an executive of his father's George Martin Leather Company.
- The Harry Herz house at 2436 N. Grant Boulevard is a 2-story Prairie style house designed by Herbst & Hufschmidt and built in 1915. It is clad in brick, with a hip roof and the emphasis on the horizontal typical of the style. Herz was a partner in A. Herz & Son, a butcher's supply company.
- The John A. Kramer house at 2437 N. Grant Boulevard is a 1.5-story bungalow designed by Charles Valentine and built in 1915, with an unusual chimney and a half-width open front porch framed by heavy brackets. Kramer was an adjuster, assistant treasurer, and paymaster for the Wisconsin Telephone Co. The district has more bungalows than any other style.
- The John H. Rauschenberg house at 2717 N. Grant Blvd. is a stately Classical Revival home designed by Henry E. Schuette and built in 1916. The airy portico spans the full front of the 2-story house and is supported by four tapered columns. The front doors are French doors, and there is a side entrance into a small wing. Rauschenberg was VP of the John Rauschenberg Company, which made rope and twine.
- The George C. Otto house at 2452 N. Grant Blvd. is a 1.5-story Craftsman bungalow built in 1919. Hallmarks of the Craftsman style are the exposed rafter tails and the knee braces under the eave ends. Otto was a clerk and department manager for M.F. Patterson Dental Supply Co.
- The Dr. Max Bornstein house at 2505 N. Grant Blvd. is a 2-story Dutch Colonial Revival home built in 1920. The symmetry, columns, and the door with sidelights make it Colonial Revival. The gambrel roof makes it Dutch. Bornstein specialized in plastic surgery and brain surgery and had an office in the Iron Block building.
- The John B. Lenartz house at 2857 N. Grant Blvd. is a 2-story Foursquare-ish house with a hip roof built in 1920. It was actually a Sears catalog home called "The Alhambra," but was clad in brick in 1928 and somewhat reshaped. Lenartz was a salesman for the Robert A. Johnson Co., a confectioner and wholesale supplier for bakeries.
- The Franklin G. Herbst house at 2550 N. Grant Blvd. is a 2-story brick home designed by Leenhouts and Guthrie and built in 1921. Colonial Revival style shows in the symmetry and the entry portico with Tuscan columns. Herbst was an executive of the Herbst Shoe Company.
- The John L. Hahn house at 2442 N. Grant Blvd. is a 1.5-story Mediterranean Revival-style home designed by Dick & Bauer and built in 1922. The roof is covered in terra cotta tiles - the hallmark of the style - but unusually steep. Everything is high-quality. The dormers in the roof are copper-clad and the gutters are copper. The first-story windows are round-headed, and the front entrance is a pavilion framed in Tuscan columns. Hahn was a contractor and later owner of the Hahn Plumbing Company. It is said that Hahn had to move out of the house in 1931 (during the Great Depression) because the city was slow to pay for contracting work he had done.
- The Edward J. Leiser house at 2856 N. Grant Blvd. is a 1.5-story English Cottage-style home built in 1922. Leiser was secretary of the Industrial Supply Company, which sold foundry supplies.
- The George F. Dewein house at 2765 N. Grant Blvd. is a Tudor Revival-styled cottage designed by Eschweiler & Eschweiler and built in 1924, with manorial windows. Dewein was a patent attorney for Allis-Chalmers.
- The Grover E. Hanisch house at 2557 N. Grant Blvd. is a brick Georgian Revival-styled house designed by R.H. Baerman and built in 1929, with quoins on the corners and around the door, and a denticulated cornice. Hanisch organized the Ideal Shoe Company. In 1934 the house was bought by Robert Dieckelman, president of Pyramid Building and Loan Association and VP of Pressed Steel Tank Company.
- The Edward Schildknecht house at 2774 N. Grant Blvd is a 1.5-story French Provincial-styled house designed by William C. Keller and built in 1931. It is clad in lannon stone, with a tile roof and with a 2-story tower with conical roof above the main entrance. Schildknecht worked his way up from office boy to president of West Side Manufacturing Company, and was president of Badger Sash and Door.
