= William Devos =

American businessman and politician

William Henry Devos (November 19, 1857 – August 28, 1936) was an American businessman who spent two terms as a Republican member of the Wisconsin State Senate's Sixth District (the 9th, 10th, 19th and 20th Wards of the City of Milwaukee, Wisconsin.

== Background ==
Devos was born November 19, 1857, in Milwaukee, of "Hollandish parentage"; he graduated from Milwaukee Public Schools and Spencerian Business College. He worked in the milling and coal businesses, and represented the 9th Ward as alderman on the Milwaukee Common Council from April 1894, to April 1896.

== Legislative service ==
He was defeated for alderman in April 1896, but was elected to the State Senate in November 1896 to succeed Democrat Oscar Altpeter, receiving 6,821 votes to 4,966 for Democratic and Populist candidate Max Hottelett and 238 for Charles Pample of the Socialist Labor Party. He was re-elected in 1900, but resigned his office in 1902 to accept the post of "Collector" [of import duties] of the Port of Milwaukee".
