= Joseph J. Hirsch =

American politician (1888–1960)

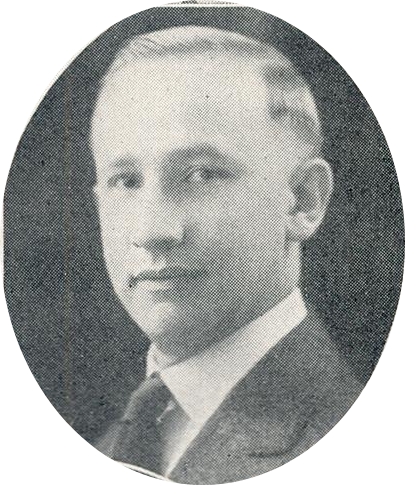
Hirsch c. 1923

Joseph Joshua Hirsch (August 27, 1888 – June 11, 1960) was an American furniture salesman from Milwaukee, Wisconsin who served one term as a Socialist member of the Wisconsin State Senate.

== Background ==
Hirsch was born in Romania on Aug. 27, 1888, and came to the United States "when but a small lad." He was educated in the public schools of New Jersey and later graduated from an agricultural college. He came to Milwaukee at the age of fifteen, finding work as a furniture salesman at Gimbel's. He had never held a public office until.elected to the Senate.

== Service in the Senate ==
Hirsch was elected to the Senate for the 6th District (6th, 7th, 9th and 10th wards of the City of Milwaukee) in 1920, to succeed fellow Socialist W. C. Zumach (who was not a candidate for re-election).

He served four years starting in 1921.

He was elected unopposed, receiving all but three of the 8,828 votes cast; and was assigned to the standing committee on corporations. He was nominated for re-election in 1924, but withdrew as Socialist nominee and was replaced on the ticket by fellow Socialist Joseph Padway, who succeeded him.

== After the Senate ==
In 1923, Hirsch he took a job with the City of Milwaukee's annexation department, and worked there until his 1953 retirement. He died June 11, 1960, of a heart attack while attending a charity event at the Pfister Hotel. At the time of his death his wife, Rebecca, and daughter Edith lived in Milwaukee, and their other daughter Anne on Long Island, New York. He is buried in Spring Hill Cemetery in Milwaukee.
