= George Weissleder =

American politician

George Herman Weissleder (December 13, 1879 – November 26, 1946) was an American coppersmith, businessman and lawyer who served as a Democratic member of the Wisconsin State Senate and the Wisconsin State Assembly.

== Biography ==
Weissleder was born in Hartford, Wisconsin. He attended Marquette University and Milwaukee Law School.

On August 27, 1913, Weissleder married Anna M. Fuhrmann. They had two children. He died on November 26, 1946, aged 66, in Milwaukee, Wisconsin. He is buried at Calvary Cemetery.

== Career ==
Weissleder was elected to the Senate in 1912. In 1932, he was elected to the Assembly to succeed Otto Kehrein.
