= Obadiah Conover =

American academic and lawyer

Obadiah Milton Conover
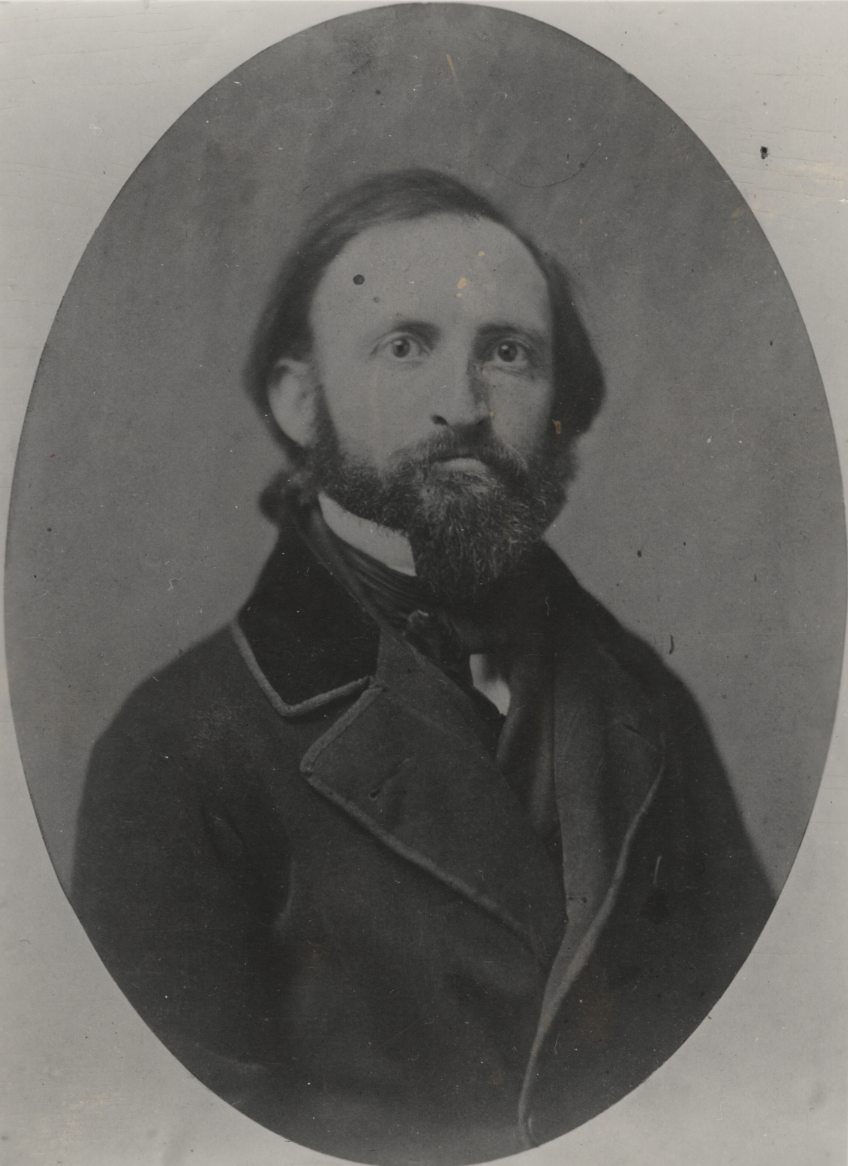
- Conover's University of Wisconsin–Madison portrait c.1852-1858

Court Reporter of the Wisconsin Supreme Court
- In office 1864–1884
- Preceded by: Philip L. Spooner Jr.

Personal details
- Born: Obadiah Milton Conover; October 7, 1825 Dayton, Ohio, U.S.
- Died: April 29, 1884 (aged 58) London, England
- Resting place: Forest Hill Cemetery; Madison, Wisconsin, U.S.
- Spouse(s): Julian Ann Darst; Sarah Fairchild
- Relations: Allan Conover (son); Jairus C. Fairchild (father-in-law); Cassius Fairchild (brother-in-law); Lucius Fairchild (brother-in-law)
- Education: Princeton University; Princeton Theological Seminary
- Profession: Linguist professor lawyer court official

Obadiah Milton Conover (October 7, 1825 - April 29, 1884), sometimes spelled as Obediah Conover or O.M. Conover, was an American lawyer, professor, and court reporter of the Wisconsin Supreme Court. Conover was the father of Madison professor and architect Allan Conover.

== Early life ==
Obadiah Milton Conover was born on October 7, 1825 in Dayton, Ohio to parents Obadiah Burlew Conover (1788-1835) and Sarah Miller Conover (1794-1872). The Conover family was of Dutch ancestry and can trace its origins to Wolfert Gerritse van Couwenhoven who originally settled New Netherland. Conover's father, Obadiah Burlew, was the builder of Conover Building in Dayton.

Conover was educated at Princeton University in New Jersey and graduated with a bachelors degree in 1841. Following graduation Conover taught Latin and Greek in Kentucky and at the Dayton Academy. In 1846 Conover entered the Princeton Theological Seminary and graduated in 1849, although he did not pursue a career in theology. Conover moved to the state of Wisconsin in 1849 and began work as a tutor for the first classes held at the newly establish University of Wisconsin–Madison in August of 1850. During this time Conover was the writer and editor of The Northwestern Journal of Education, Science, and General Literature.

== Career ==
From 1852 to 1858 Conover was the professor of ancient languages and literature for the University of Wisconsin–Madison. Conover was later a regent of the University of Wisconsin-Madison from 1859 to 1865. Conover taught in North Hall at UW-Madison alongside chancellor John Hiram Lathrop and professor John Whelan Sterling. Conover was succeeded by Stephen H. Carpenter as the professor of logic and English literature at UW-Madison.

In 1859 Conover was admitted to bar examination of Wisconsin and allowed to practice law in Dane County, Wisconsin. Beginning in 1861 at the outbreak of the American Civil War Conover was appointed by Philip L. Spooner Jr. as the assistant court reporter of the Wisconsin Supreme Court. In 1864 Conover succeeded Spooner as the court reporter. Conover would serve in this position until his death in 1884. From 1864 to 1884 Conover published volumes 17-49 of Reports of cases argued and determined in the Supreme Court of the State of Wisconsin.

Conover died unexpectedly on April 29, 1884 at the age of 58 while traveling with his wife Sarah in London. Conover is buried at Forest Hill Cemetery in Madison.

== Personal life ==
Conover had two total spouses, his first wife was Julia Ann Darst (1827-1863) who he married on November 27, 1849 in Dayton, together they had three children. One of Conover's sons was the famous architect Allan Conover. Another of Conover's sons was Frederick King Conover (1857-1919) who became a famous lawyer and professor for UW-Madison. Conover's second wife was Sarah Fairchild (1827-1912) who he married in 1882. Sarah was the eldest child of Jairus C. Fairchild and the sister of both Cassius Fairchild and Lucius Fairchild.

== Selected works ==
- The Northwestern Journal of Education, Science, and General Literature. Vol. 1, No. 1.
- Reports of Cases Argued and Determined in the Supreme Court of the State of Wisconsin. Vol. 17 - 84.
