= Eliab B. Dean Jr. =

American politician

Superintendent of Public Property of Wisconsin
- In office January 1874 – June 30, 1874
- Governor: William Robert Taylor
- Preceded by: A. A. Meredith
- Succeeded by: James G. Knight

President pro tempore of the Wisconsin Senate
- In office January 5, 1852 – January 3, 1853
- Preceded by: Duncan Reed
- Succeeded by: Duncan Reed

Member of the Wisconsin Senate from the 9th district
- In office January 6, 1851 – January 3, 1853
- Preceded by: Alexander Botkin
- Succeeded by: George R. McLane

County Judge of Dane County
- In office September 1846 – November 1848
- Appointed by: Henry Dodge
- Preceded by: Jesse A. Clark
- Succeeded by: Daniel B. Steeden

Personal details
- Born: November 7, 1819 Raynham, Massachusetts, U.S.
- Died: July 22, 1900 (aged 80) Fitchburg, Wisconsin, U.S.
- Resting place: Forest Hill Cemetery, Madison, Wisconsin
- Party: Democratic
- Spouse: Sarah Fairchild (m. 1847, divorced)
- Children: Ella "Lottie" (b. 1849; died 1853)
- Relatives: Nathaniel W. Dean (brother)

Eliab Byram Dean Jr., (November 7, 1819 – July 22, 1900) was an American businessman, Democratic politician, and Wisconsin pioneer. He served as Superintendent of Public Property under Governor William Robert Taylor, and was a member of the Wisconsin State Senate for the 1851 and 1852 sessions, representing Dane County. In historic documents, his name is frequently abbreviated as E. B. Dean.

== Biography ==
Dean was born in Raynham, Bristol County, Massachusetts, in 1819. He came to the Wisconsin Territory in the early 1840s. In 1842, he settled at the village of Madison and started a merchant business with his brother, Nathaniel W. Dean, dealing in dry goods and other groceries. In 1849, Nathaniel started a solo business, and Eliab started a partnership known as Dean & Ruggles with J. D. Ruggles, dealing again in groceries and general goods.

Dean also became involved in politics with the Democratic Party of Wisconsin. He was a political ally and business partner of other prominent Madison Democrats, such as Levi Baker Vilas, Simeon Mills, and his father-in-law Jairus C. Fairchild. He also joined the Madison masonic lodge in 1845, the first year after it was established.

In 1846, he was elected to the Madison Village Board. Later that year, he was appointed probate judge for Dane County by Territorial Governor Henry Dodge, ultimately serving until the fall of 1848.

He was elected to the Wisconsin State Senate in 1850, representing all of Dane County for the 1851 and 1852 sessions.

During the 1852 session, he was elected President pro tempore of the Senate by his colleagues.

After his Senate term, with a Democratic President in power in Washington, Dean began to seek federal appointments. His allies pushed for his appointment as 2nd Assistant Postmaster General in 1853, but were unsuccessful. In 1855, however, he received an appointment as receiver of the United States General Land Office at Superior, Wisconsin, from President Franklin Pierce.

The 1860s saw Democrats significantly diminished in Wisconsin due to the politics of the American Civil War. During these years, Dean served several terms on the Madison City Council. He was also a delegate from Wisconsin to the 1864 Democratic National Convention, which nominated General George B. McClellan, and the 1872 Democratic National Convention, which nominated Horace Greeley.

In 1873, William Robert Taylor was elected Governor of Wisconsin—the first Democratic Governor of the state since 1856. His election set off an intense competition among Democrats—who had long been out of office—for some of the top state political appointments. The office of Superintendent of Public Property was particularly desirable due to its lucrative nature. Shortly after his inauguration, Governor Taylor selected Eliab B. Dean. Dean only lasted six months in office, however, as he was noted as being frequently drunk. He was asked to resign, refused, and was subsequently fired.

Though his businesses were successful and earned him substantial wealth earlier in his life, he seems to have lost most of his fortune in his later years. Accounts of his life frequently refer to his alcoholism. For the last year of his life, he was incapable of caring for himself, and was tended to at the home of Henry Messerschmidt. He died at Messerschmidt's home in the town of Fitchburg, Wisconsin, on July 22, 1900.

== Personal life and family ==
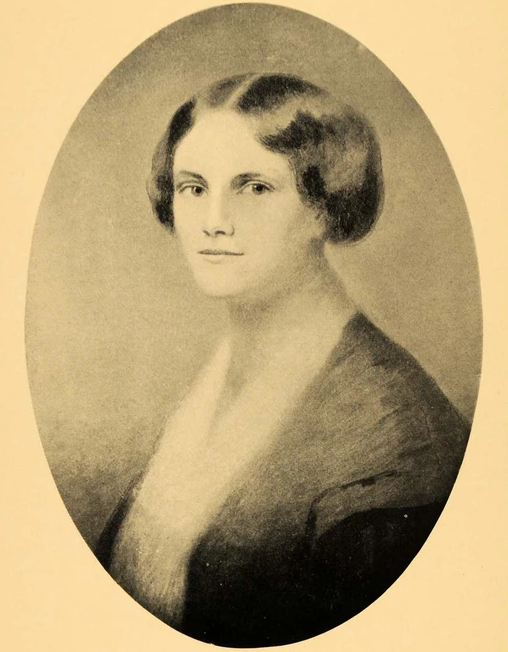
Portrait of Sarah Fairchild by Eastman Johnson

Dean married Sarah Fairchild on January 9, 1848. Sarah was the daughter of the influential state Democrat Jairus C. Fairchild, who would, soon after the marriage, become Wisconsin's first State Treasurer. Sarah's younger brothers, Cassius and Lucius, were also prominent Democratic politicians in the 1850s and popular Union Army colonels in the American Civil War. After the war, Lucius would run for office as a Republican, and became the 10th Governor of Wisconsin (1866–1872). Dean and Fairchild had one daughter, Ella ("Lottie"), but the girl died in childhood. They later divorced.

Wisconsin Senate
Preceded by Alexander Botkin	Member of the Wisconsin Senate from the 9th district January 6, 1851 – January 3, 1853	Succeeded by George R. McLane
Preceded by Duncan Reed	President pro tempore of the Wisconsin Senate; January 5, 1852 – January 3, 1853	Succeeded by Duncan Reed
Political offices
Preceded by A. A. Meredith	Superintendent of Public Property of Wisconsin; January 1874 – June 30, 1874	Succeeded by James G. Knight
