= John R. Briggs Jr. =

19th century American politician

Member of the Wisconsin Senate from the 18th district
- In office January 3, 1853 – January 2, 1854
- Preceded by: Duncan Reed
- Succeeded by: Louis P. Harvey

Member of the Wisconsin State Assembly from the Rock 2nd district
- In office January 7, 1850 – January 6, 1851
- Preceded by: Samuel Colley
- Succeeded by: John Bannister

Personal details
- Born: c.1822 Montague, Massachusetts, U.S.
- Died: December 3, 1872 (aged 49–50) Washington, D.C., U.S.
- Cause of death: Tuberculosis
- Resting place: Rosehill Cemetery, Chicago
- Party: Whig
- Spouse: Emily Pomona "Olivia" Edson (m. 1854–1872)
- Children: John Edson Briggs; Arthur Briggs
- Relatives: George N. Briggs (uncle); Henry Shaw Briggs (cousin)
- Occupation: Journalist

John Reading Briggs Jr., (c.1822 – December 3, 1872) was an American newspaper publisher, politician, and pioneer of Wisconsin and Iowa. He served in the Wisconsin State Senate and Assembly, representing Rock County. He was described as a personal friend of Abraham Lincoln, and was employed as stationery clerk for the United States House of Representatives for the last decade of his life. His wife was Emily Briggs, a pioneering female journalist in Washington, D.C.

== Biography ==
John R. Briggs Jr., was born in Montague, Massachusetts, about 1822. At age 14, he apprenticed in the printing trade. After five years of apprenticeship, he was employed by Henry L. Dawes as editor of the North Adams, Massachusetts, Transcript newspaper. He then went to work editing and publishing the Whig in Troy, New York.

From Troy, he moved to the new state of Wisconsin in 1848 and settled at Beloit, Wisconsin, in Rock County. There he founded the Beloit Journal of Politics, Literature, and General Intelligence, a weekly newspaper.

In November 1849, he was elected to the Wisconsin State Assembly, representing southern Rock County. In 1852, following the redistricting act which added six new seats to the Wisconsin State Senate, Briggs won a special election to represent the 18th Senate district.

In 1854, due to a conflict in the language of the redistricting law versus the language of the Wisconsin Constitution—which specified Senate terms as two years—he claimed he was entitled by his 1852 election to another year as state senator. The issue was debated in the Senate, but they ultimately ruled against his petition.

Later that year, Briggs moved to Keokuk, Iowa, where he became part owner of the Daily Whig newspaper. Briggs was a staunch anti-slavery Whig, and joined the new Republican Party which was then being created. He renamed his paper the Daily Gate City.

While working on the paper, Briggs became friendly with Abraham Lincoln, who was then becoming a leading voice in the new Republican Party. Briggs did extensive work reporting the Lincoln–Douglas debates in the 1858 United States Senate election in Illinois. Through his political connections with Lincoln, he was appointed assistant clerk of the United States House of Representatives after Lincoln became president in 1861. He worked for the Office of the Clerk of the United States House of Representatives for the rest of his life.

John Briggs suffered from tuberculosis for fifteen years before finally succumbing to the disease. He died at his home in Washington, D.C., on December 3, 1872.

== Personal life and family ==
John R. Briggs Jr., was a nephew of Massachusetts Governor George N. Briggs and a cousin of Union Army general Henry Shaw Briggs.

He married Emily Pomona Edson in 1854. Emily Edson was a daughter of wealthy blacksmith Robert Edson, who had moved to Chicago from New York. Her father had selected a wealthy man for her husband, but she defied him and married Briggs instead. Emily Briggs assisted her husband with his newspaper, and then became famous as a correspondent for The Philadelphia Press, using the pen-name "Olivia". John and Emily Briggs had two sons, though one died in infancy.

Just a year before his death, they purchased the "Maples" mansion at 619 D Street, S.E. The home later came to be known as Friendship House after being purchased by the Friendship House Association in 1936. It is now listed in the National Register of Historic Places.

Wisconsin State Assembly
Preceded by Samuel Colley	Member of the Wisconsin State Assembly from the Rock 2nd district January 7, 1850 – January 6, 1851	Succeeded by John Bannister
Wisconsin Senate
Preceded by Duncan Reed	Member of the Wisconsin Senate from the 18th district January 3, 1853 – January 2, 1854	Succeeded by Louis P. Harvey
