= Wiley Scribner =

American politician

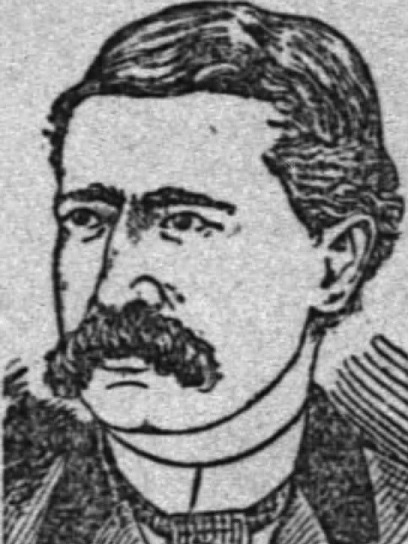
- The Sunday Inter-Ocean (Chicago, IL), September 29, 1889

Acting Governor of the Montana Territory
- In office December 1869 – August 1870
- Preceded by: James Mitchell Ashley
- Succeeded by: Benjamin F. Potts

Cook County Recorder of Deeds
- In office December 1884 – September 28, 1889
- Preceded by: James W. Brockway

Member of the Wisconsin State Assembly
- In office circa 1866

Personal details
- Born: September 6, 1840 Jacksonville, Illinois
- Died: September 28, 1889 (aged 49) Chicago, Illinois
- Resting place: Forest Hill Cemetery, Madison, Wisconsin
- Party: Republican

Military service
- Allegiance: United States
- Branch/service: Union Army
- Rank: Colonel
- Unit: 16th Wisconsin Volunteer Infantry Regiment
- Battles/wars: American Civil War

Wiley Smith Scribner (September 6, 1840 – September 28, 1889) was an American politician and acting governor of Montana Territory from 1869 to 1870.

Born in Jacksonville, Illinois, Scribner grew up in Fair Play, Grant County, Wisconsin, where he became postmaster and was a merchant. He later studied law and was admitted to the bar. Scribner was a Republican.

Scribner served in the 16th Wisconsin Volunteer Infantry Regiment during the American Civil War. He entered the Union army with the rank of private. He was promoted to captain, a rank he held while participating in Sherman's March to the Sea. During his four years of service, he ultimately obtained the rank of colonel. Battles he participated in included the Siege of Corinth, Battle of Shiloh, Holly Springs Raid, Siege of Vicksburg, and the Battle of Atlanta.

In 1866, Scribner was elected to the Wisconsin State Assembly. He later moved to Montana Territory, where he became a newspaper editor for the Helena Herald and eventually became territorial secretary. From 1869 to 1870 he was the territory's acting governor. He married Mary L. Reynolds in 1870. In 1872 he returned to Wisconsin, and then in 1873 he moved to Chicago, Illinois, where he practiced law and became clerk of the probate court. In 1884, Scribner was elected recorder of deeds for Cook County, Illinois serving until his death.

Scribner died in Chicago on September 29, 1889. He was buried at Forest Hill Cemetery in Madison, Wisconsin.
