= Duncan Reed =

19th century American engineer and politician

President pro tempore of the Wisconsin Senate
- In office January 3, 1853 – January 2, 1854
- Preceded by: Eliab B. Dean Jr.
- Succeeded by: Benjamin Allen
- In office January 6, 1851 – January 5, 1852
- Preceded by: Position established
- Succeeded by: Eliab B. Dean Jr.

Member of the Wisconsin Senate
- In office January 3, 1853 – January 2, 1854
- Preceded by: Joel Squires
- Succeeded by: Edward McGarry
- Constituency: 6th district
- In office January 7, 1850 – January 3, 1853
- Preceded by: Asa Kinney
- Succeeded by: John R. Briggs Jr.
- Constituency: 18th district

Personal details
- Born: July 2, 1815 Shelburn, Vermont, U.S.
- Died: September 14, 1890 (aged 75) Milwaukee, Wisconsin, U.S.
- Cause of death: Dropsy
- Resting place: Forest Home Cemetery, Milwaukee, Wisconsin
- Party: Democratic
- Spouse: Mary Hanes (m. 1837; died 1883)
- Children: Frances Dela Bates (adopted); Mary L. (McIntyre)

Military service
- Allegiance: United States
- Branch/service: United States Army; Union Army; Wisconsin Militia
- Years of service: 1853–1855 (Militia); 1862–1863 (USV)
- Rank: Colonel (Militia); Captain, USV
- Unit: 24th Reg. Wis. Vol. Infantry
- Battles/wars: American Civil War: Battle of Perryville; Battle of Stones River

Duncan Cameron "Cam" Reed (July 2, 1815 – September 14, 1890) was an American steamship engineer and Democratic politician, and an early settler of Milwaukee, Wisconsin. He served two terms in the Wisconsin State Senate, representing the southern half of Milwaukee County, and was President pro tempore of the Senate for the 1851 and 1853 sessions. He also briefly served as a Union Army officer in the American Civil War.

== Background ==
Reed was born in Shelburn, Vermont, on July 2, 1815. He became a marine engineer, and had visited Milwaukee at least as early as 1834. He moved to Milwaukee permanently on July 8, 1841, arriving as chief engineer of the steamship City of Milwaukee or Milwaukee (reputedly "the fastest boat on the lakes at that time"), which he had helped to sneak out of the harbor of Buffalo, New York, at the instigation of Solomon Juneau, part-owner thereof, who claimed that the boat was being retained in Buffalo unjustly by the other owners. He remained in the engineering trade, serving on lake steamers such as the C. C. Trowbridge, the Andromeda and the Nucleus. In 1851, he was one of a group (including Alexander Mitchell, George H. Walker, Increase Lapham, and others) which petitioned the State Legislature for a charter for the Milwaukee and Fond du Lac Railroad, one of the short-lived railroad companies which would eventually become part of the Chicago, Milwaukee, St. Paul and Pacific Railroad system.

== Public office ==
As of 1853, he was 37 years of age; his biographical listing showed that he was an "engineer", was born in Vermont and had lived in Wisconsin for 12 years. Reed served four years (1850-1853) as a Democratic member of the State Senate, first from the Eighteenth District, then (after a redistricting) from the Sixth. During the 1851 and 1853 sessions, he served as President pro tempore of the Senate. He was succeeded in the Senate by fellow Democrat Edward McGarry.

He served four years as a deputy United States Marshal; and in 1858 was elected coroner for Milwaukee County.

== Military service ==
In 1853 Reed was a colonel of the 1st Regiment, 1st Division of the Wisconsin Militia under Major General Rufus King.

On August 21, 1862, he was commissioned a captain in the 24th Wisconsin Infantry Regiment (which "Cam" had helped organize) commanding Company "E"; but he was discharged in January 1863.

== After the Civil War ==
After the war, he worked as a professional boiler inspector, billing various state agencies for that service. He was appointed a boiler inspector for the Steamboat Inspection Service of the United States government during the Grant administration, a position he would hold until his death.

== Personal life ==
Reed married Mary Hanes in 1837. An adopted daughter, Frances Dela Bates, died at the age of five in 1854. Mary Hanes Reed died in 1883. They had one daughter, Mary L. (Reed) McIntyre, known as "Mamie", who would survive them both.

Reed was one of the founding members of the Old Settlers Club of Milwaukee and of the State Historical Society of Wisconsin, as well as a state Grand Master of the Odd Fellows fraternal order. Reed Street (later renamed South Second Street) in the old Third Ward of Milwaukee was named after him; when he had first settled there at what would become the corner of Greenfield and Reed Street, it was a mere wilderness trail with but three houses upon it.

He died of dropsy on September 14, 1890, after a long illness. He was buried in Forest Home Cemetery.

Wisconsin Senate
Preceded by Asa Kinney	Member of the Wisconsin Senate from the 18th district January 7, 1850 – January 3, 1853	Succeeded by John R. Briggs Jr.
Preceded by Joel Squires	Member of the Wisconsin Senate from the 6th district January 3, 1853 – January 2, 1854	Succeeded by Edward McGarry
Position established	President pro tempore of the Wisconsin Senate; January 6, 1851 – January 5, 1852	Succeeded by Eliab B. Dean Jr.
Preceded by Eliab B. Dean Jr.	President pro tempore of the Wisconsin Senate; January 3, 1853 – January 2, 1854	Succeeded by Benjamin Allen
