= Stephen H. Carpenter =

American linguist and writer

Stephen Haskins Carpenter
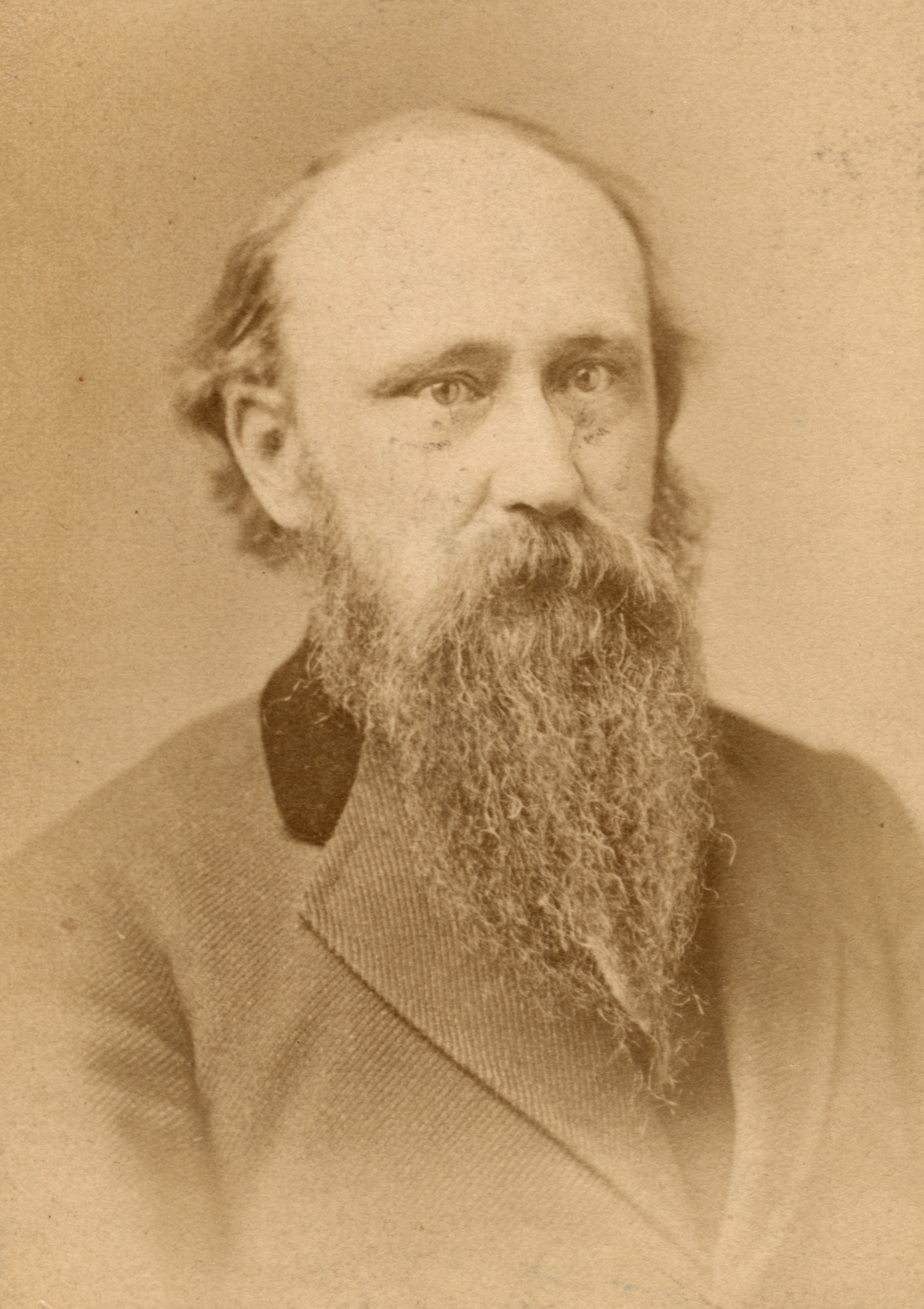
- Carpenter c. 1870s
- Born: August 7, 1831; Little Falls, New York, U.S.
- Died: December 7, 1878 (aged 47); Geneva, New York, U.S.
- Burial place: Forest Hill Cemetery, Madison, Wisconsin, U.S.
- Occupations: Linguist educator writer
- Spouse: Frances Curits

Academic background
- Education: Madison College; University of Rochester

Academic work
- Discipline: Linguistics; Language Preservation; English language Philosophy
- Sub-discipline: Old English; Old English literature Anglo-Saxon culture Speculative philosophy Evolution
- Institutions: St. Paul's Episcopal College; University of Wisconsin-Madison
- Notable works: See Selected works

Stephen Haskins Carpenter (August 7, 1831 – December 7, 1878) was an American academic, professor, philosopher, and linguist from Little Falls, New York. During his lifetime Carpenter oversaw the growth and management of various departments at the University of Wisconsin–Madison from the 1860s to the 1870s. Carpenter's primary focus of study was the English language and texts of the Anglo-Saxons, including specialties in Old English and Old English literature, such as literary works by Geoffrey Chaucer. Carpenter's contribution to the study of the Anglo-Saxon language and its grammar in-detail helped to pioneer an early form of language preservation of endangered languages and foster the study of extinct language.

== Early life and education ==
Stephen Haskins Carpenter was born on August 7, 1831 in Little Falls, New York, to parents Reverend Calvin Green Carpenter and Laura Haskins-Carpenter. Carpenter was homeschooled as a child before entering his formal education at the Munro Collegiate Institute (also called the Munro Academy) in Elbridge, New York. In 1848 Carpenter enrolled at Madison College (later Colgate University) in Hamilton, New York, for two years before transferring to the University of Rochester and graduating with an Bachelor of Arts (BA) degree in 1852, a Master of Arts (MA) in 1855, and later an Legum Doctor (LL.D.) degree in 1872.

== Career ==
Carpenter first moved to Wisconsin in 1852 where he initially worked as a tutor for the University of Wisconsin–Madison. From 1857 to 1860 Carpenter served as the clerk of the Wisconsin Board of Education. In 1860 Carpenter was appointed as the professor of ancient languages at St. Paul's Episcopal College in Palmyra, Missouri. At the outbreak of the American Civil War Carpenter moved back to Wisconsin and worked in the printing trade before being elected as the city clerk of Madison, Wisconsin from 1864 to 1868. Carpenter was also the superintendent of Dane county schools before he eventually became a tutor and later an associate professor for UW-Madison. Carpenter succeeded UW-Madison professor Obadiah Conover as the professor of ancient languages, logic, rhetoric, and English literature in 1865 and would continue his teaching practice for many years.

In 1872 Carpenter published the book English Of The XIV Century, Illustrated By Notes, Grammatical And Philological, On Chaucer's Prologue And Knight's Tale: Designed To Serve As An Introduction To The Study Of English Literature which contains a significant study of the English language during the times of Geoffrey Chaucer. Later in 1875 Carpenter was appointed as the president of the University of Kansas but declined the offer. In 1876 Carpenter served as the head examiner for the State Superintendent of Public Instruction in Wisconsin.

Carpenter was later involved in the field of speculative philosophy via the Wisconsin Academy of Sciences, Arts, and Letters, which he was vice president of. Carpenter is described by the Wisconsin Academy of Sciences as an "evolutionist but not Darwinian" in terms of his studies and speculations on Charles Darwin's theory of human evolution which peaked in popularity around the 1860s and 1870s. One of Carpenter's works during his time with the Wisconsin Academy of Sciences was his 1874 title The Philosophy of Evolution: Together With a Preliminary Essay on The Metaphysical Basis of Science. Carpenter was also greatly involved with the early formation of the Wisconsin Historical Society and served as a curator.

Carpenter died on December 7, 1878 in Geneva, New York, due to complications of diphtheria. The Wisconsin Academy of Sciences described the death of Carpenter as "one of the saddest events we have been called on to chronicle - The loss to the Wisconsin University, in his death, is an irreparable one, and the world of letters has been bereft of one of its most brilliant writers and thinkers". Carpenter is buried at Forest Hill Cemetery in Madison, Wisconsin.

== Personal life ==
Carpenter was married to Frances Curtis of Madison, Wisconsin on May 14, 1856. Carpenter was a member of the American Anglican Episcopal Church. As a writer, several of Carpenter's works contributed towards religion, basic education, and theology. One of Carpenter's works on religion would be Songs for the Sabbath School: a New Collection of Sabbath School Melodies.

== Selected works ==
- Songs for the Sabbath School: a New Collection of Sabbath School Melodies: Part I: Embracing a Great Variety of New Hymns and Tunes, Adapted to the Wants of sabbath Schools, &c. (1867).
- English Of The XIV Century, Illustrated By Notes, Grammatical And Philological, On Chaucer's Prologue And Knight's Tale: Designed To Serve As An Introduction To The Study Of English Literature (1872).
- The Philosophy of Evolution: Together With a Preliminary Essay on The Metaphysical Basis of Science (1874).
- An Historical Sketch of the University of Wisconsin: from 1849 to 1876 (1876).
- An Introduction to the study of the Anglo-Saxon language: Comprising an elementary grammar, selections for the readings with explanatory notes and a vocabulary (1880).
- The Elements of English Analysis Illustrated by a New system of Diagrams (1887).
