= Nathaniel W. Dean =

American politician

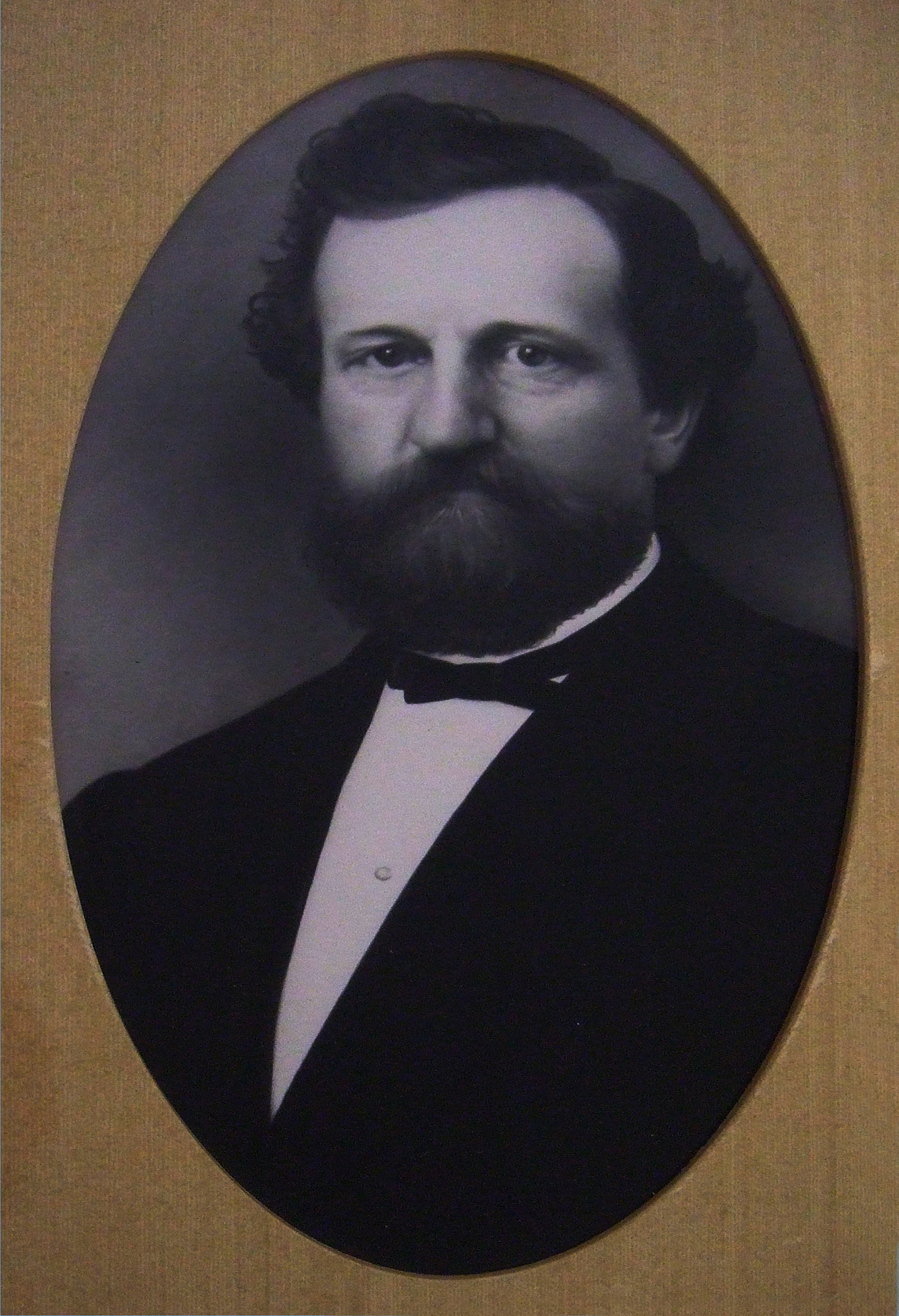

Member of the Wisconsin State Assembly from the Dane 6th district
- In office January 5, 1857 – January 4, 1858
- Preceded by: District established
- Succeeded by: Alexander A. McDonell

Personal details
- Born: September 17, 1817 Raynham, Massachusetts, U.S.
- Died: February 28, 1880 (aged 62) Madison, Wisconsin, U.S.
- Resting place: Forest Hill Cemetery, Madison, Wisconsin
- Party: Republican; Whig (before 1854)
- Spouse: Harriet H. Morrison (m. 1847–1880)
- Relatives: Eliab B. Dean Jr. (brother)

Nathaniel W. Dean (September 17, 1817 – February 28, 1880) was an American merchant, real estate speculator, and Wisconsin pioneer. He served one term in the Wisconsin State Assembly, representing Madison, Wisconsin, as a Republican.

== Biography ==
Dean was born on September 17, 1817, in Raynham, Bristol County, Massachusetts. He received an education there, and taught school during the winters of 1835 and 1836. In 1838, he went west to the Michigan Territory, and settled at Niles, where he operated a successful merchant business. He lost everything in a fire in 1842, however, and moved west across Lake Michigan into the Wisconsin Territory, and went to work as a clerk for his cousin Dr. Weston in the village of Madison.

In 1844, he went into business with his brother, Eliab B. Dean, dealing in dry goods and other groceries. They initially operated out of the building previously owned by the Madison Argus, but later moved to a building known as the "Great Arcade Building" on King Street, east of the Wisconsin State Capitol. In 1849, Eliab began a new partnership with J. D. Ruggles and Nathaniel operated his own store. Nathaniel Dean continued operating as a successful merchant until 1857, when he retired from this role to focus on his other business pursuits and real estate holdings. He continuously added to his real estate holdings throughout his life, with lands across the state of Wisconsin, and extending as far away as Kansas.

He had been a founding shareholder of the Madison Mutual Insurance Company in 1851, and was elected to the company's first executive committee that year. In 1854, he was chosen as the company's president, to replace Simeon Mills, and served in that role until 1861. He was also a founding member of several other Madison institutions of his era, including the first Madison Fire Department, the Madison Institute—an early library and reading room for hosting lectures and promoting intellectual improvement in the city—and the Madison Gas Light and Coke company. In his later years, he was also a founding shareholder in the Park Savings Bank in Madison, and served on the board of directors.

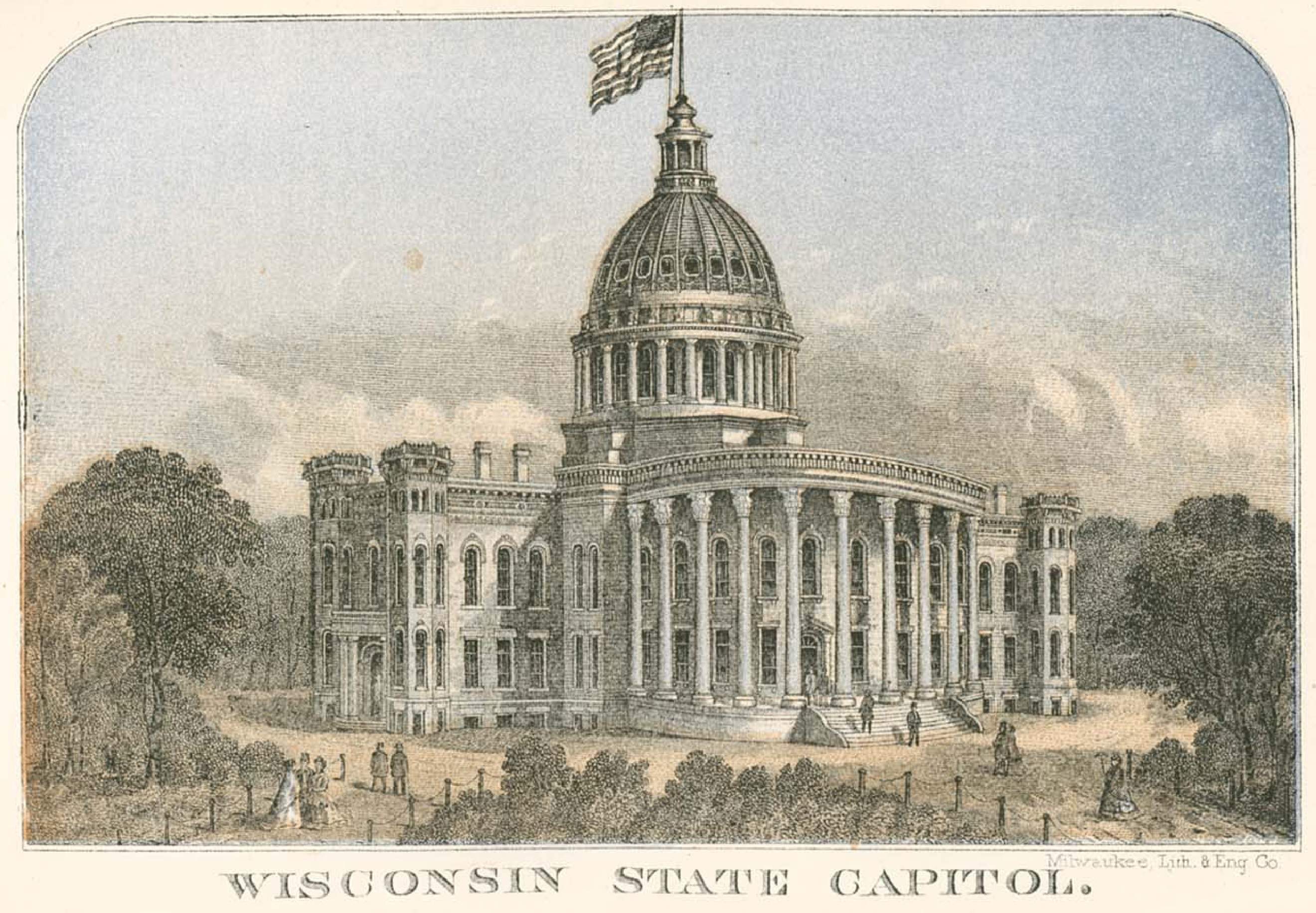
1863 engraving of the Wisconsin State Capitol.

Politically, Dean was a member of the Whig Party, which put him in the political minority in the early years of Wisconsin. Nevertheless, he was appointed to the Board of Regents of the University of Wisconsin, and was elected Treasurer of the board in 1858, serving until 1861. He became a member of the Republican Party when it was created from the remnants of the Whig and Free Soil parties in 1854, and was elected on the Republican ticket to the Wisconsin State Assembly in 1856. He represented Dane County's newly created 6th Assembly district, composed of the 2nd, 3rd, and 4th wards of the city of Madison (at the time the majority of the city). During his term in the Assembly, he was a leading voice for the construction of the 3rd Wisconsin State Capitol building, which completed construction in 1869.

Dean died at his home in Madison on February 28, 1880, and was buried at Madison's historic Forest Hill Cemetery. His funeral oration was performed by University of Wisconsin President John Bascom.

His former home, now known as the Nathaniel W. Dean House, is listed on the National Register of Historic Places and serves as a museum. When he lived there, between 1856 and 1871, it was the base of his 500-acre estate in what was then still part of the town of Blooming Grove—the land has subsequently been annexed to the city of Madison, and his former estate now makes up most of the Monona Municipal Golf Course.

== Personal life and family ==
Nathaniel Dean married Harriet H. Morrison. Harriet was the daughter of Wisconsin pioneer James Morrison, who had first arrived in the territory in 1827, became the Treasurer of the Wisconsin Territory under James Duane Doty and Nathaniel Tallmadge, and had extensive land holdings in Wisconsin, Illinois, and St. Louis. Dean and Morrison had one son, but he died in childhood.

Wisconsin State Assembly
New district	Member of the Wisconsin State Assembly from the Dane 6th district January 5, 1857 – January 4, 1858	Succeeded by Alexander A. McDonell
