= Robert Macauley (Wisconsin politician) =

19th century American politician and judge (1838–1904)

The Honorable Robert J. Macauley
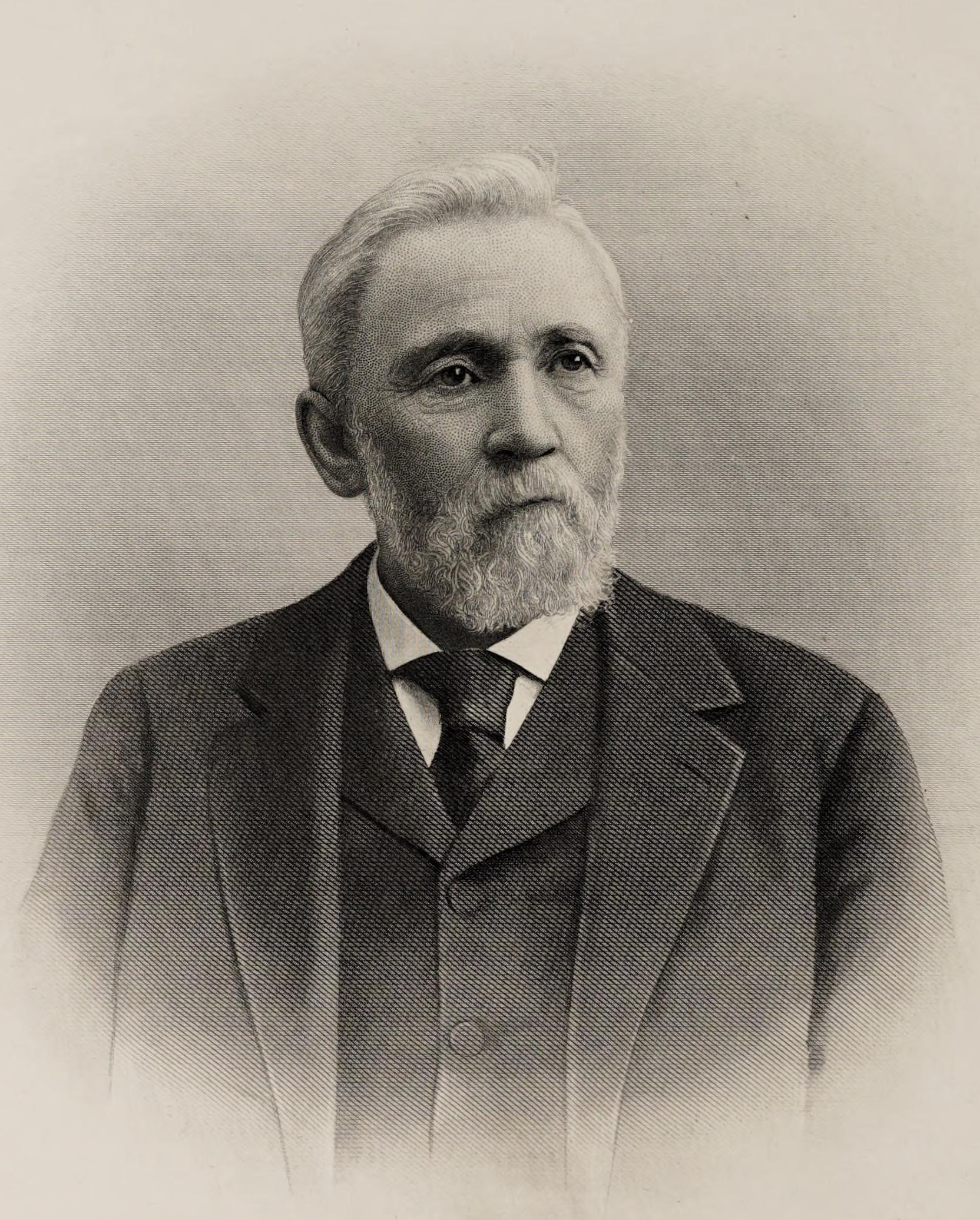

Member of the Wisconsin State Assembly from the Dunn County district
- In office January 1, 1883 – January 1, 1885
- Preceded by: Edward L. Everts
- Succeeded by: John M. Oddie

Judge of Dunn County, Wisconsin
- In office January 1, 1898 – January 1, 1902
- Preceded by: John Kelley Jr.
- Succeeded by: W. S. Swenson
- In office January 1, 1874 – January 1, 1882
- Preceded by: P. C. Holmes
- Succeeded by: John Kelley Jr.

District Attorney of Dunn County, Wisconsin
- In office January 1, 1891 – January 1, 1893
- Preceded by: R. D. Whitford
- Succeeded by: Peleg B. Clark
- In office January 1, 1869 – January 1, 1871
- Preceded by: Samuel W. Hunt
- Succeeded by: R. C. Bierce

Personal details
- Born: February 18, 1838 Glasgow, Scotland, UK
- Died: March 17, 1904 (aged 66) Menomonie, Wisconsin, U.S.
- Resting place: Evergreen Cemetery, Menomonie
- Party: Republican
- Spouses: Cora Olson; (died 1906)
- Children: John W. Macauley^{(b. 1871; died 1942)}; Martha (North)
- Parents: Robert Macauley (father); Margaret (Cavanaugh) Macauley (mother)
- Occupation: lawyer, judge

Military service
- Allegiance: United States
- Branch/service: United States Volunteers; Union Army
- Years of service: 1864–1865
- Unit: 16th Reg. Wis. Vol. Infantry
- Battles/wars: American Civil War: Savannah campaign; Carolinas campaign; Battle of Bentonville

Robert J. Macauley (February 18, 1838 – March 17, 1904) was a Scottish American immigrant, lawyer, and Republican politician from Menomonie, Wisconsin. He served one term in the Wisconsin State Assembly, representing Dunn County during the 1883 term. He also served four years as district attorney and 12 years as county judge. In historical documents his name is sometimes spelled "McCauley".

== Biography ==
Born in Glasgow, Scotland, Macauley immigrated to the United States with his family in 1842. They initially settled on a farm in Hancock County, Illinois, where his father died five years later. Robert worked on the farm and obtained a basic education until 1852, when most of the family moved north to another farm near Menomonie, Wisconsin. He worked on the new family farm until 1864, when he began studying law in the office of Judge E. B. Bundy, who was married to Macauley's sister, Reubena Hadlock Macauley. But after six months of study, he enlisted for service with the Union Army in the American Civil War.

He was enrolled as a private in Company G, 16th Wisconsin Volunteer Infantry Regiment. The 16th Wisconsin was organized under General William Tecumseh Sherman's Military Division of the Mississippi. Macauley arrived with the regiment just after the Atlanta campaign, and participated in Sherman's March to the Sea and the Carolinas campaign.

On July 1, 1865, Macauley returned to Menomonie and continued his studies under Judge Bundy, and, in January 1867, he was admitted to the State Bar of Wisconsin at Eau Claire. Judge Bundy then took him on as a partner in his firm.

== Public offices ==
In 1868, he was elected district attorney of Dunn County; he served until 1873, earning re-election in 1870. In November 1873, he was elected County Judge for Dunn County and served two four year terms. The November after leaving office as County Judge, he was elected to represent Dunn County in the Wisconsin State Assembly as a Republican in the first election in the state for two-year assembly terms. He did not run for re-election in 1884. He was City Attorney for Menomonie from 1882 until 1890, when he was elected to another term as district attorney. He served a final four-year term as County Judge from 1898 to 1902.

== Personal life and family ==
Judge Macauley married Cora Olson of Menomonie on May 9, 1869. They had one son and one daughter.

Macauley was a member of the Grand Army of the Republic from the time of its organization, and a member of the Episcopal Church. His farm was approximately four hundred acres and was located about twelve miles outside Menomonie.

Judge Macauley died in Menomonie, Wisconsin, on March 17, 1904.

== Electoral history ==
Wisconsin Assembly, Dunn County District Election, 1882
Party	Candidate	Votes	%	±%
General Election, November 7, 1882
Republican	Robert Macauley	1,553	67.32%	+0.33%
Democratic	Sever Severson	754	32.68%	
Total votes		2,307	100.0%	+15.35%
Republican hold				

Wisconsin State Assembly
Preceded by Edward L. Everts	Member of the Wisconsin State Assembly from the Dunn County district January 1, 1883 – January 1, 1885	Succeeded by John M. Oddie
Legal offices
Preceded by Samuel W. Hunt	District Attorney of Dunn County, Wisconsin; January 1, 1869 – January 1, 1873	Succeeded by R. C. Bierce
Preceded by P. C. Holmes	Judge of Dunn County, Wisconsin; January 1, 1874 – January 1, 1882	Succeeded by John Kelley Jr.
Preceded by R. D. Whitford	District Attorney of Dunn County, Wisconsin; January 1, 1891 – January 1, 1893	Succeeded by Peleg B. Clark
Preceded by John Kelley Jr.	Judge of Dunn County, Wisconsin; January 1, 1898 – January 1, 1902	Succeeded by W. S. Swenson
