= George R. McLane =

American doctor and politician (1819–1855)

Member of the Wisconsin Senate from the 9th district
- In office January 3, 1853 – January 1, 1855
- Preceded by: Eliab B. Dean Jr.
- Succeeded by: Denison Worthington

Personal details
- Born: December 20, 1819 Wilmington, Delaware, U.S.
- Died: August 16, 1855 (aged 35) Delafield, Wisconsin, U.S.
- Resting place: Old Swedes Churchyard, Wilmington, Delaware
- Party: Democratic
- Spouse: none
- Children: none
- Relatives: Allan McLane (grandfather); Louis McLane (uncle); George Read (great-grandfather)
- Education: Newark College; University of Pennsylvania School of Medicine
- Profession: Physician

George Read McLane (December 20, 1819 – August 16, 1855) was an American medical doctor, politician, and Wisconsin pioneer. He was a member of the Wisconsin Senate, representing northern Waukesha County during the 1853 and 1854 sessions. At the time of his death, he was vice president of the Wisconsin Historical Society.

== Biography ==
George Read McLane was born in Wilmington, Delaware, a scion of two prominent Delaware families. He received his primary education at the Newark Academy, then attended Newark College for two years. At that time, he had become interested in civil engineering, and studied under Isaac R. Trimble, who was then an engineer in charge of the Baltimore and Susquehanna Railroad. After two years, however, he decided that he would instead follow his father into the medical profession.

He studied with his father and then graduated from the University of Pennsylvania School of Medicine. He then went to work as a practicing physician in the hospitals of Philadelphia, and then operated in private practice in partnership with his father.

After a period of poor health, he visited the Wisconsin Territory in 1847, then returned and established permanent residence in the Fall of 1848, shortly after Wisconsin achieved statehood.

He purchased a tract of land in the town of Delafield, in Waukesha County, which was known for many years as "Readland", in honor of his mother's family. The estate included a mile of waterfront on Delafield's Pine Lake, and came to be known as one of the finest farms in the county.

In 1852, he ran for Wisconsin Senate on the Democratic Party ticket in the 9th State Senate district. At the time, the district comprised roughly the northern half of Waukesha County. He won election and served a two-year term, participating in the 6th and 7th Wisconsin legislatures.

He did not run for re-election in 1854, and was appointed superintendent of the yet-to-be-built state insane asylum, which had been authorized by the Legislature in 1854. In that capacity, he visited many of the similar institutions of the eastern states and drew up a model for the treatment of patients in Wisconsin. But the construction of the hospital was delayed by controversy over corruption, and McLane ultimately died before the hospital became a reality.

== Personal life and family ==
George Read McLane was one of five children born to Allen and Catherine (née Read) McLane. Allen McLane was also a notable medical doctor in his native Delaware. George McLane's paternal grandfather was Colonel Allan McLane, who served as an officer in the Continental Army through most of the American Revolutionary War. Louis McLane, who served as a United States senator, Treasury Secretary, Secretary of State, and Ambassador to the United Kingdom, was his uncle.

On his mother's side, his great-grandfather was George Read, one of the signers of the United States Declaration of Independence and a highly influential legal and political leader in early Delaware.

George Read McLane never married and had no known children.

Wisconsin Senate
Preceded by Eliab B. Dean Jr.	Member of the Wisconsin Senate from the 9th district January 3, 1853 – January 1, 1855	Succeeded by Denison Worthington
