= 16th Wisconsin Infantry Regiment =

Union Army infantry regiment

- Flag of Wisconsin
- Active: January 31, 1862 – July 12, 1865
- Country: United States
- Allegiance: Union
- Branch: Union Army
- Role: Infantry
- Size: Regiment
- Engagements: American Civil War: Battle of Shiloh; Battle of Corinth; Vicksburg Campaign; Atlanta campaign; Battle of Kennesaw Mountain; Battle of Atlanta; March to the Sea; Carolinas campaign; Battle of Bentonville

Commanders
- Colonel: Benjamin Allen
- Lt. Col.: Thomas Reynolds
- Colonel: Cassius Fairchild
- Major: William F. Dawes
- Major: Joseph Craig

The 16th Wisconsin Infantry Regiment was a volunteer infantry regiment that served in the Union Army during the American Civil War. For much of the war, the regiment was commanded by Cassius Fairchild, the brother of Wisconsin's 10th governor Lucius Fairchild.

== Service ==
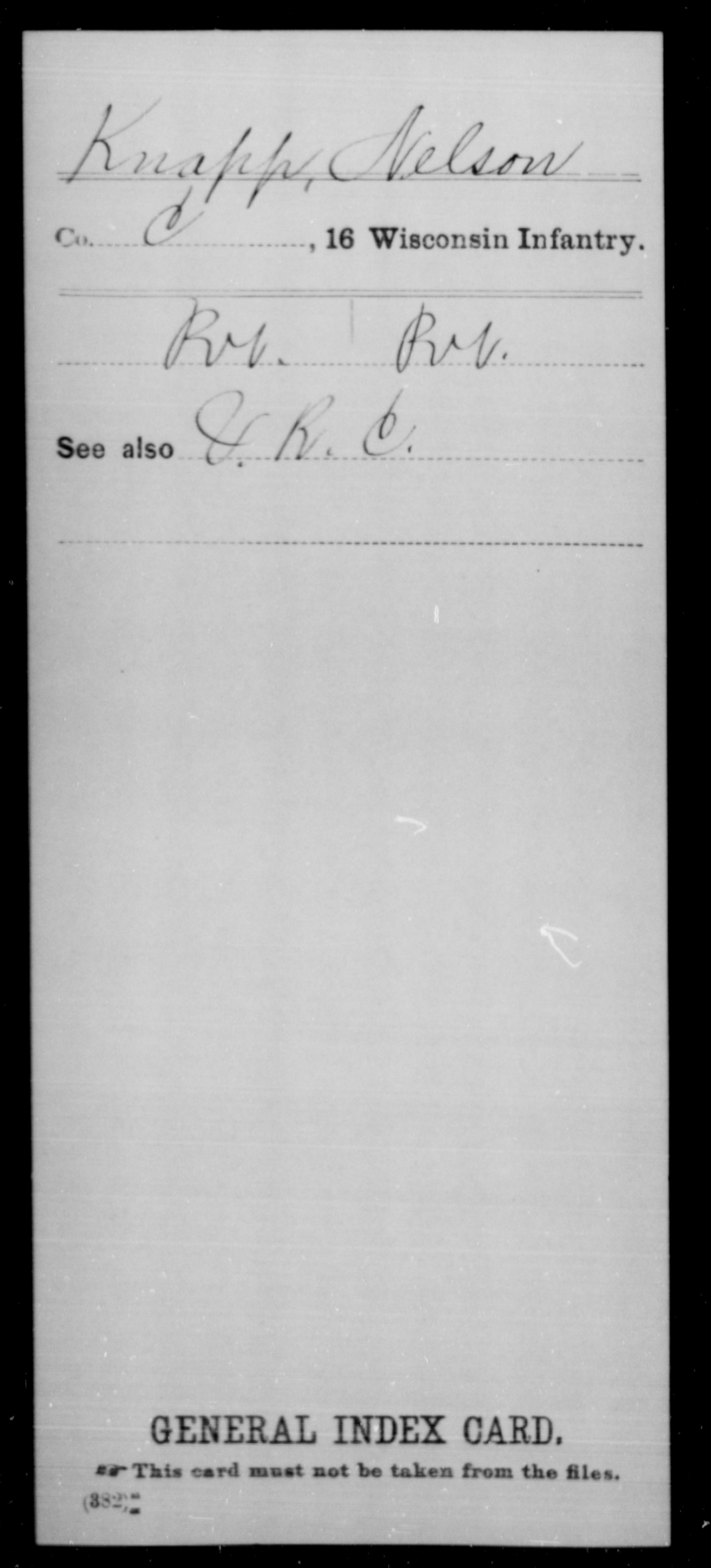
Index card for Nelson Knapp, 16th Wisconsin Infantry Regiment

The 16th Wisconsin was raised at Madison, Wisconsin, and mustered into Federal service January 31, 1862.

16th Wisconsin Company Organization
Company	Earliest Moniker	Primary Place of Recruitment	Company Commanders
A	Waushara and Green Lake County Rangers	Waukesha, Green Lake, and Waushara Counties	Edward Saxe †; George A. Spurr; John W. Cotanch; Anthony Gallagher †; John L. Vidal; James A. Biggert
B	Oconomowoc Rifles	Dodge, Waukesha, and Milwaukee Counties	George Henry Fox
C	Dodge County Guards	Dodge and Dane Counties	Horace Patch †; Paschal M. Hovey †; Ernest Seifert
D	Hanchettville Union Guards	The city of Marshall, Dane, Columbia, Dodge, Jefferson and Rock Counties	Oliver D. Pease †; Edwin B. Roys
E	Adams County Rifles	Adams, Milwaukee, Washington County, and Green Counties	William F. Dawes; Rives C. Rowe; Charles H. Bassett
F	Northern Lights	Juneau, Vernon and Sheboygan Counties	Harrison V. Train; Bertram E. Stevens
G	Chippewa Valley Guards	Ozaukee, Eau Claire, Chippewa, Dane, and Pepin Counties	John R. Wheeler; Henry M. Culbertson
H	Tredway Pumas	Waushara, Marquette, Dane and Green Lake Counties	Henry G. Webb; Almon Dwight Gray; John Coomer
I	Darlington Light Infantry	Lafayette, Dane and Milwaukee Counties	Sylvester W. Osborn; Bertram E. Stevens; William S. Monroe; Davillo Saunders
K	Ozaukee Rifles	Ozaukee County	George C. Williams; Richard P. Derickson; Daniel F. Vail; John S. Steadman

The regiment was mustered out on July 12, 1865.

== Casualties ==
The 16th Wisconsin suffered 6 officers and 141 enlisted men killed in action or who later died of their wounds, plus another 4 officer and 248 enlisted men who died of disease, for a total of 399 fatalities.

The six-man color guard were all killed on April 6, 1862. They are memorialized with cenotaphs at what was the apex of the Shiloh Military Cemetery overlooking the Tennessee River.

== Commanders ==
- Colonel Benjamin Allen (October 10, 1861 – July 17, 1863) was wounded at Shiloh and resigned due to lingering illness. Before the war he had served as a Wisconsin state senator.
  - Lt. Colonel Thomas Reynolds (April 6, 1862 – April 1863) Commanded the regiment as major when Colonel Allen and Lt. Colonel Fairchild were recuperating from wounds after Shiloh. Later commanded the regiment as a lieutenant colonel while Colonel Fairchild commanded the brigade. He received an honorary brevet to colonel at the end of the war.
- Colonel Cassius Fairchild (July 17, 1863 – July 12, 1865) was also wounded at Shiloh. He commanded the brigade during the last phase of the war and received an honorary brevet to brigadier general. Before the war he had served as a Wisconsin state legislator. After the war he was appointed United States marshal for Wisconsin.
  - Major William F. Dawes (July 21, 1864 – December 21, 1864) commanded the regiment when Colonel Fairchild commanded the brigade and Lt. Col. Reynolds was wounded. Mustered out at the end of his three-year enlistment. He was previously captain of Co. E.
  - Major Joseph Craig (December 21, 1864 – April 1865) commanded the regiment as a captain when Colonel Fairchild commanded the brigade. Promoted to major in April 1865. He was previously captain of Co. F.

== Notable members ==
- George Caldwell was enlisted briefly in Co. D. He had originally been enlisted in the 32nd Wisconsin Infantry Regiment, but was transferred to the 16th Wisconsin Infantry in June 1865.
- Jacob Fawcett was a corporal in Co. I and was wounded at Shiloh and Atlanta. After the war he became a justice of the Nebraska Supreme Court.
- David G. James was enlisted in Co. F and later transferred to Co. C. He was taken prisoner during the Atlanta campaign. When mustering out, he received an honorary brevet to captain. After the war he became a Wisconsin state senator.
- Norman L. James was a private in Co. F. After the war he became a Wisconsin state senator.
- Robert Macauley was drafted into Co. G. After the war he became a Wisconsin state legislator and judge.
- Sylvester W. Osborn was captain of Co. I for the first year. After the war he became a Wisconsin state legislator.
- Horace Patch was captain of Co. C. He was wounded at Shiloh and died of disease two months later. He had served as a Wisconsin legislator before the war.
- George Myron Sabin was adjutant of the regiment and was detailed to serve as a judge advocate in Vicksburg from 1863 until civil courts resumed operation, rising to the rank of lieutenant colonel. Prior to joining the 16th Wisconsin, he was a corporal in the 1st Wisconsin Infantry Regiment and was commissioned quartermaster in the 11th Wisconsin Infantry Regiment. After the war, he was appointed United States district judge for the District of Nevada.
- Wiley Scribner was first lieutenant of Co. E and later quartermaster. After the war he became secretary of the Montana Territory and was acting governor in 1870.
- Henry G. Webb was the first captain of Co. H, but only served a few months and never left Wisconsin. Later he served as a Wisconsin state senator and Kansas state legislator and judge.

== See also ==
- List of Wisconsin Civil War units
- Wisconsin in the American Civil War
