= John B. Sweat =

19th century American politician

Member of the Wisconsin Senate from the 26th district
- In office January 2, 1860 – January 6, 1862
- Preceded by: Andrew Proudfit
- Succeeded by: Benjamin F. Hopkins

Member of the Wisconsin State Assembly from the Dane 4th district
- In office January 5, 1857 – January 4, 1858
- Preceded by: George P. Thompson
- Succeeded by: Henry K. Belding

Register of Deeds of Dane County, Wisconsin
- In office January 1, 1853 – January 1, 1855
- Preceded by: James G. Fox
- Succeeded by: James G. Fox

Personal details
- Born: August 12, 1827 Vermont, U.S.
- Died: March 30, 1893 (aged 65) Washington, D.C., U.S.
- Resting place: Congressional Cemetery, Washington, D.C.
- Party: Democratic
- Spouse: Eliza Jane Hollister (m. 1849)
- Children: Irving M. Sweat^{(b. 1850; died 1889)}; Ella Sweat^{(b. 1852; died 1866)}
- Profession: Lawyer

John B. Sweat (August 12, 1827 – March 30, 1893) was an American lawyer, Democratic politician, and Wisconsin pioneer. He was a member of the Wisconsin Senate, representing the western half of Dane County during the 1860 and 1861 sessions. He previously served one year in the Wisconsin State Assembly in the 1857 session.

== Biography ==
John B. Sweat was born in Vermont in August 1827. He came west to the Wisconsin Territory sometime before 1849, settling first in Waukesha County, where he was married. In 1850, he moved to the town of Black Earth, in Dane County, Wisconsin, where he erected the first grist mill in the township.

He soon became involved in local politics. He was elected register of deeds of Dane County in 1852, running on the Democratic Party ticket. In 1856 he was elected chairman of the Black Earth town board and was ex officio a member of the Dane County Board of Supervisors.

In the fall of 1856, he was the Democratic nominee for Wisconsin Senate in the 26th Senate district, which at the time comprised roughly the western half of Dane County. He defeated Republican John W. Johnson in the general election. He served in the Senate during the 1860 and 1861 sessions. He was not a candidate for re-election in 1861.

Sometime after leaving office, he went to Washington, D.C., and was employed as a deputy clerk for the Supreme Court of the District of Columbia under fellow Wisconsinite Thomas Hood. After that job, he continued his legal career in the District of Columbia.

He died in Washington, D.C., on March 30, 1893.

== Personal life and family ==
John B. Sweat was a son of Isaac D. Sweat. Isaac Sweat also moved to Wisconsin and settled in Black Earth.

John B. Sweat married Eliza Jane Hollister in 1849 at Vernon, Wisconsin. They had at least two children together before her death in 1869. Their only known daughter died young. Their only known son, Isaac, became a physician but also died at a relatively young age.

Wisconsin State Assembly
Preceded by George P. Thompson	Member of the Wisconsin State Assembly from the Dane 4th district January 5, 1857 – January 4, 1858	Succeeded by Henry K. Belding
Wisconsin Senate
Preceded by Andrew Proudfit	Member of the Wisconsin Senate from the 26th district January 2, 1860 – January 6, 1862	Succeeded by Benjamin F. Hopkins
Political offices
Preceded by James G. Fox	Register of Deeds of Dane County, Wisconsin; January 1, 1853 – January 1, 1855	Succeeded by James G. Fox
