= Nathaniel W. Dean House =

Historic house in Wisconsin, United States

- U.S. National Register of Historic Places
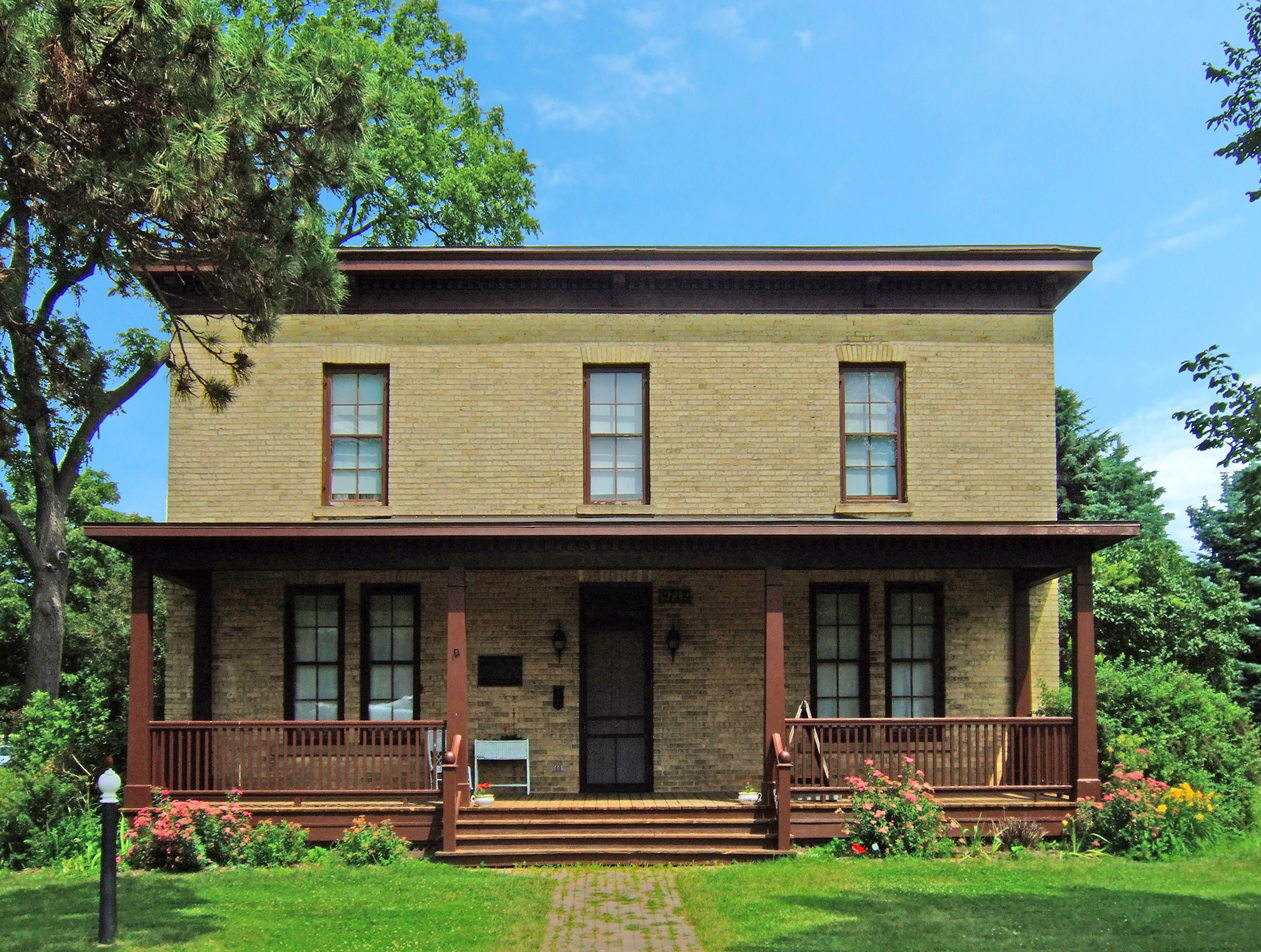
- Nathaniel W. Dean House

- Location within Wisconsin Location within the United States
- Location: 4718 Monona Dr., Madison, Wisconsin
- Coordinates: 43°04′06″N 89°19′32″W
- Area: 0.1 acres (0.040 ha)
- Built: 1856
- NRHP reference No.: 80000119
- Added to NRHP: November 7, 1980

The Nathaniel W. Dean House is a simple brick Italianate-style home built about 1856 in Madison, Wisconsin for Dean, an early leader and developer in the area. In 1980 the house was added to the National Register of Historic Places.

== History ==
Nathaniel W. Dean was born in Massachusetts in 1817 and arrived in Madison in 1842. He initially co-owned a successful dry goods business, then shifted into real estate. In 1846 he was elected clerk to the Dane County Board of Supervisors. In 1857 he was elected state assemblyman for one term. A Whig and then Republican, he generally supported business interests and railroads. He also supported building the third state capitol and Negro suffrage. He also served as treasurer of the UW Board of Regents and in that role planned UW funding through land sales and had a hand in planning North Hall, South Hall and Bascom Hall.

In 1855 Dean bought from the UW 160 acres on which this house sits in the town of Blooming Grove. It was then farmland, and he and his wife Harriet had this farmhouse built - perhaps a country retreat from Madison. The house is two stories and rectangular. The design is on the simple end of Italianate, with a symmetric front, simple stone window sills, and plain brick lintels. A dentilated wood cornice surrounds the top except on the back side, hiding a flat tarred roof. A wood porch which echoes the cornice spans the front of the house.

Dean's main interests were in the city of Madison. His real estate office was in an office block called Dean's Block that he built at King and Pinckney streets. He eventually became the largest stockholder in the Park Hotel at Carroll and Main Streets. In later years, Dean rented a room in Madison, but he gave his occupation as "farmer" in the 1870 census, and is listed in Blooming Grove. He also donated land for Blooming Grove's town hall and Commonwealth Cemetery.

After Dean died in 1880, Harriet sold the house to Frank Allis. He sold to Adolph H Kayser in 1916. Then a private golf club bought the house and land in 1922, and sold it to the city of Madison in 1928. It served as a public golf course clubhouse for decades. In 1971, when the city was set to demolish the old house, the new Blooming Grove Historical Society decided to save and restore it. In 1980 the house was added to the NRHP for its association with "Nathaniel Dean, a leader in the development of 19th century Madison", and as "the only remaining residence still extant from the early years of Blooming Grove. Currently, the house serves as a museum.
