= Emily Briggs =

American journalist (14 September 1830–03 July 1910)

Emily Pomona Edson Briggs
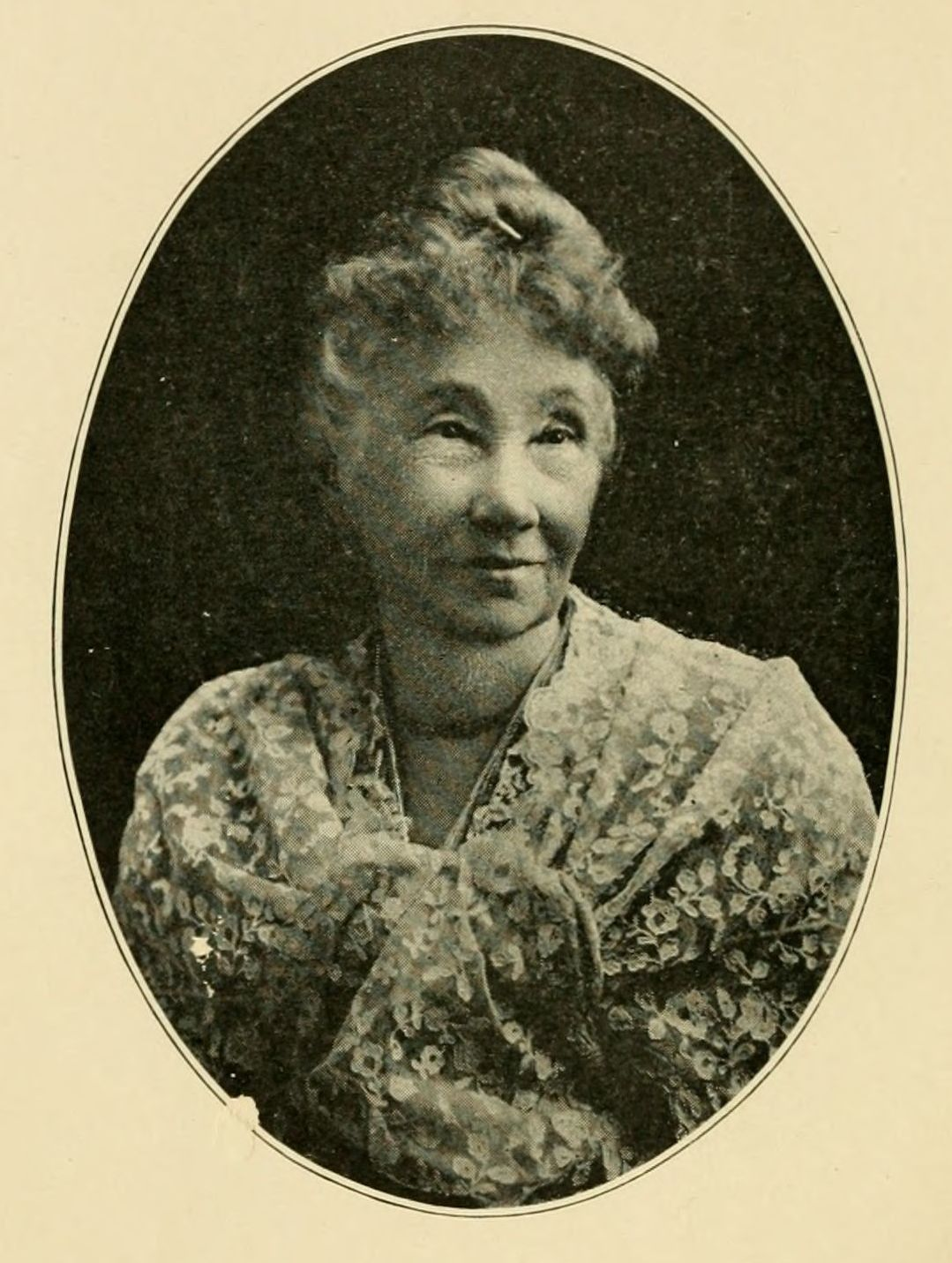
- Emily Pomona Edson Briggs in 1906.
- Born: September 14, 1830; Burton, Ohio
- Died: July 3, 1910 (aged 79); Washington, D.C.
- Other names: Olivia
- Occupation: Journalist
- Spouse: John R. Briggs Jr. (m. 1854; died 1872)

Emily Pomona Edson Briggs (September 14, 1830 – July 3, 1910) was a journalist in Washington, D.C. during the 19th century. She was one of the first American women to become nationally known as a reporter. She came to national attention during the Civil War for her writing under the pen name Olivia in the Washington Chronicle and Philadelphia Press.

== Early life ==
Emily Pomona Edson was born in Burton, Ohio, in 1830. Her parents were Mary Umberfield (previously Umberville) and Robert Edson, a blacksmith. She grew up in Ohio and later on a farm in Illinois outside Chicago after 1840. Her family moved to Chicago in 1854, where her father found success in real estate.

Edson worked briefly as a teacher in Painesville, Ohio, before marrying John R. Briggs around 1854. The couple had two children, John and Arthur, the latter of whom died at a young age. When her husband became a part-owner of the Keokuk, Iowa, Daily Whig (later renamed the Gate City), they moved westward.

== Career ==
After the Keokuk newspaper went bankrupt, the Briggses moved from Iowa to Washington, D.C., in 1861. Her husband had been asked by President Abraham Lincoln to work as a financial clerk for the House of Representatives. While living in Washington, Briggs became interested in reporting and commenting on national politics.

After she wrote an angry letter to the Washington Chronicle in support of women being employed by the government, amid criticism of the female clerks replacing men sent off to war, she was hired to write for the paper. She began writing under the pen name "Olivia," by which she became well known nationally, because of taboos against a woman's name appearing in print except upon her marriage or death. In addition to the Chronicle, her writing was published regularly in the Philadelphia Press, a sister publication to the Chronicle, and her work was reprinted in newspapers across the country. After starting out writing book reviews, she was asked to write a daily column, which became very popular. Her column was unusual for a female journalist of the period for its incisive political commentary, although it also covered society and fashion.

While writing for the Chronicle, Briggs became the first female press correspondent to report directly from the White House, and she became close to the Lincoln family. She also became one of the first women to be allowed to report from the press gallery of the U.S. Congress. She covered Andrew Johnson's impeachment, as well as multiple presidential inaugurations. She was able to report from the White House throughout Ulysses S. Grant's presidency, but was barred for unclear reasons once Rutherford B. Hayes took office in 1877.

Briggs was one of the first female journalists to become well known nationally in the United States. She was paid around $3,500 a year for her work, and her family lived at the National Hotel so she would not have to worry about keeping up with household chores. Every night at 8 p.m., a messenger on horseback would come to pick up her column and bring it to the train station so it could be printed the next morning in Philadelphia. She was also one of the first female correspondents to report spot news by telegraph.

She was openly partisan, frequently defending the Republican Party. She wrote against racism in the post-Civil War period, lamenting, "Slavery is dead, it is true, but the black man is not a citizen," but she expressed relative ambivalence about women's suffrage, although she covered the National Woman Suffrage Association's conventions in 1870 and 1871.

In 1882, Briggs was elected as the founding president of the Woman's National Press Association, though she also stopped writing regularly for newspapers that year.

== Later years ==
In 1871, Briggs and her husband purchased a house at 619 D Street SE, naming it Maple Square. It later come to be known as Friendship House after being purchased by the Friendship House Association in 1936, and it is now on the National Register of Historic Places. She was widowed in 1872, shortly after their move to D Street.

After her husband's death, she remained active in the local social and political scene, with Frederick Douglass among her friends, and she would host extravagant events for various local organizations. In 1898 established Olivia University, through which she sought to offer education in journalism, library science, domestic science, and other disciplines for working-class people.

A collection of her columns was published in 1906 as The Olivia Letters.

Briggs died in 1910 at her home in Washington.
