= Horace Patch =

American politician (1814–1862)

Horace D. Patch (August 7, 1814 – June 22, 1862) was an American politician.

Born in Onondaga County, New York, Patch went to Cazenovia Academy. He then practiced law in Ohio. In 1843, Patch moved to Whitewater and then to Calamus, Wisconsin Territory. He then moved to Beaver Dam, Wisconsin in 1848 and practiced law. He served in the first Wisconsin Constitutional Convention of 1846 as a Democrat. He also served in local government offices. Patch then served in the Wisconsin State Assembly in 1852. In 1861, Patch recruited the 16th Wisconsin Volunteer Infantry Regiment during the American Civil War, where he served as a captain. He was wounded in the Battle of Pittsburg Landing and died in Corinth, Mississippi as a result of his wounds.
