= Benjamin F. Hopkins =

American politician (1829–1870)

Member of the U.S. House of Representatives from Wisconsin's 2nd district
- In office March 4, 1867 – January 1, 1870
- Preceded by: Ithamar Sloan
- Succeeded by: David Atwood

Member of the Wisconsin Senate from the 26th district
- In office January 1, 1862 – January 1, 1864
- Preceded by: John B. Sweat
- Succeeded by: Thomas Hood

Member of the Wisconsin State Assembly from the Dane 5th district
- In office January 1, 1866 – January 1, 1867
- Preceded by: James Ross
- Succeeded by: Eleazer Wakeley

Personal details
- Born: Benjamin Franklin Hopkins; April 22, 1829 Granville, New York, U.S.
- Died: January 1, 1870 (aged 40) Milwaukee, Wisconsin, U.S.
- Resting place: Forest Hill Cemetery, Madison, Wisconsin
- Party: Republican
- Spouses: Ethalinda Lewis (died 1855); Mary E. Willcut; (died 1899)
- Children: Arthur Frank Hopkins; (died 1854)
- Parent: Ervin Hopkins (father)

Benjamin Franklin Hopkins (April 22, 1829 – January 1, 1870) was an American politician, telegraph operator, and Wisconsin pioneer. He was a member of the U.S. House of Representatives, representing Wisconsin's 2nd congressional district for the last three years of his life, from 1867 until his death on New Years Day 1870. Before serving in Congress, he had served one term each in the Wisconsin Senate and Wisconsin State Assembly, representing Dane County, and served as a private secretary to Wisconsin governor Coles Bashford.

== Biography ==
Born in Granville, New York, Hopkins attended the common schools as a child and later became a telegraph operator.

=== Early political career ===
He moved to Fond du Lac, Wisconsin, and then to Madison, Wisconsin, in 1849, and served as a private secretary to Governor Coles Bashford in 1856 and 1857. He was exonerated of involvement in the Bashford railroad scandal in 1860. He was a member of the Wisconsin Senate in 1862 and 1863 and served in the Wisconsin State Assembly in 1866.

=== Congress ===
Hopkins was elected a Republican to the United States House of Representatives in 1866 as part of the 40th United States Congress, representing Wisconsin's 2nd congressional district. He was reelected to the 41st Congress and served from 1867 until his death. There, he served as chairman of the Committee on Public Buildings and Grounds from 1869 to 1870.

=== Death and burial ===
He died in Madison, Wisconsin, on January 1, 1870, following an attack of paralysis. He was interred in Forest Hill Cemetery in Madison, Wisconsin.

His death created a vacancy in congress that was filled by David Atwood for the remainder of the 41st Congress.

== See also ==
- List of members of the United States Congress who died in office (1790–1899)

U.S. House of Representatives
Preceded by Ithamar Sloan	Member of the U.S. House of Representatives from Wisconsin's 2nd congressional district March 4, 1867 – January 1, 1870	Succeeded by David Atwood
