= David Atwood =

American politician (1815–1889)

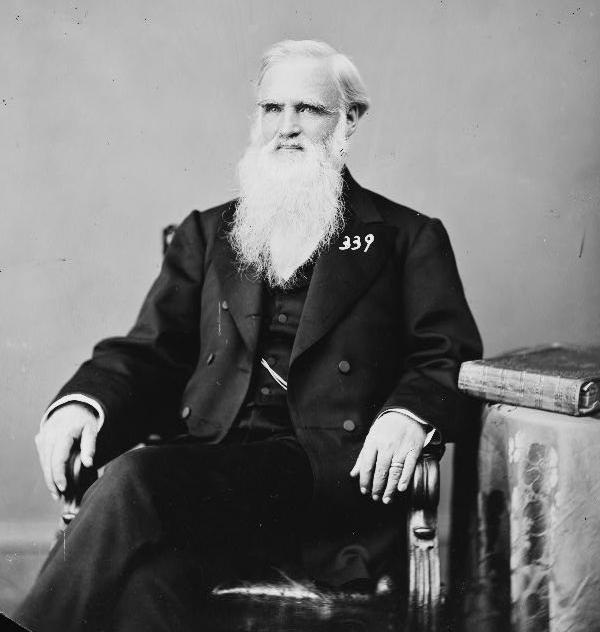

Member of the U.S. House of Representatives from Wisconsin's 2nd district
- In office February 15, 1870 – March 3, 1871
- Preceded by: Benjamin F. Hopkins
- Succeeded by: Gerry W. Hazelton

Member of the Wisconsin State Assembly from the Dane 6th district
- In office January 9, 1861 – January 8, 1862
- Preceded by: Cassius Fairchild
- Succeeded by: Position Abolished

Personal details
- Born: December 15, 1815 Bedford, New Hampshire, U.S.
- Died: December 11, 1889 (aged 73) Madison, Wisconsin, U.S.
- Resting place: Forest Hill Cemetery, Madison
- Party: Republican
- Spouse: Mary A. Sweeney (m. 1849–1889)
- Children: Charles David Atwood; (b. 1850; died 1878); Harrie Farwell Atwood; (b. 1852; died 1906); Mary Louisa Atwood; (b. 1855; died 1940); Elizabeth Gordon (Vilas); (b. 1857; died 1936)
- Parents: David Atwood (father); Mary (Bell) Atwood (mother)
- Profession: Politician, publisher, editor, printer

David Atwood (December 15, 1815 – December 11, 1889) was an American journalist, publisher, Republican politician, and Wisconsin pioneer. He worked for 42 years as the influential editor and publisher of the Wisconsin State Journal in Madison, Wisconsin. During that time, he also served one year in the U.S. House of Representatives, representing Wisconsin's 2nd congressional district during the 2nd and 3rd sessions (1870–1871) of the 41st Congress.

== Biography ==
Born in Bedford, New Hampshire, Atwood attended the public schools as a child. He moved to Hamilton, New York in 1832 where he was apprenticed as a printer and later became publisher of the Hamilton Palladium. He moved to Freeport, Illinois in 1845 and engaged in agricultural pursuits before moving to Madison, Wisconsin in 1847 and for forty-two years was editor and publisher of the Wisconsin Journal. Atwood was commissioned a major general in the Wisconsin Militia by Governor Alexander W. Randall in 1858, was a member of the Wisconsin State Assembly in 1861, was a United States assessor for four years and served as mayor of Madison, Wisconsin in 1868 and 1869.

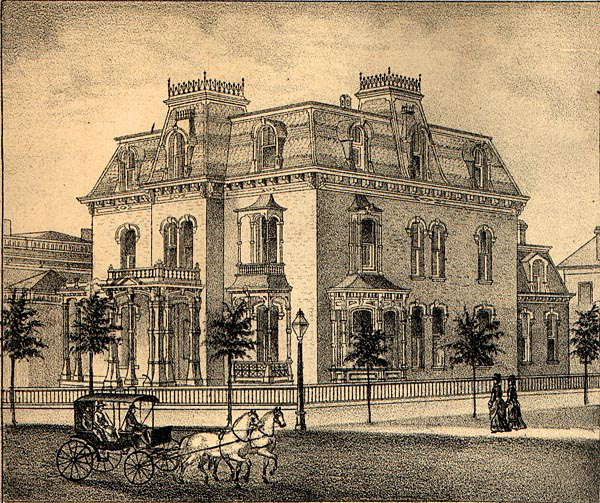
The Atwood residence in Madison, Wisconsin, designed by David R. Jones

In 1870, he was elected a Republican to the United States House of Representatives to fill a vacancy caused by the death of Benjamin F. Hopkins. He took over representing Wisconsin's 2nd congressional district in the 41st Congress serving until 1871 and declined to be a candidate for renomination in 1870 to the 42nd Congress.

Afterwards, Atwood resumed activities in the newspaper business, was a commissioner at the Centennial Exposition representing the State of Wisconsin from 1872 to 1876 and was a delegate to the Republican National Convention in 1872 and 1876.

He died in Madison, Wisconsin, on December 11, 1889, and was interred in Forest Hill Cemetery in Madison.

U.S. House of Representatives
Preceded by Benjamin F. Hopkins	Member of the U.S. House of Representatives from Wisconsin's 2nd congressional district February 23, 1870 – March 3, 1871	Succeeded by Gerry W. Hazelton
