= Jairus C. Fairchild =

American Democratic politician (1801–1862)

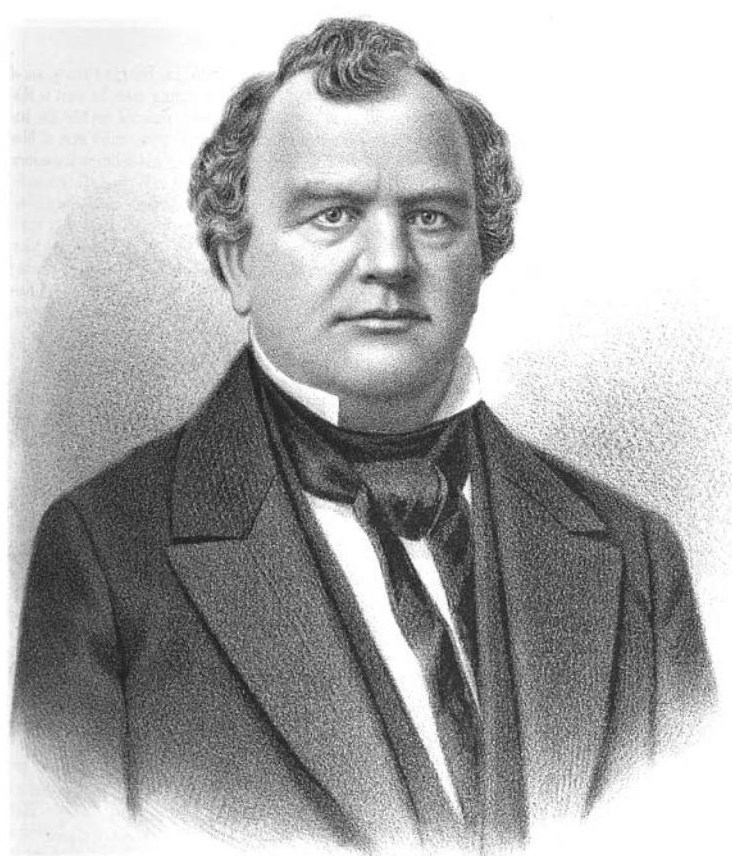

1st State Treasurer of Wisconsin
- In office June 7, 1848 – January 5, 1852
- Governor: Nelson Dewey
- Preceded by: Position Established
- Succeeded by: Edward H. Janssen

1st Mayor of Madison, Wisconsin
- In office April 7, 1856 – April 6, 1857
- Preceded by: Peter Van Bergen (as Village President)
- Succeeded by: Augustus A. Bird

Personal details
- Born: Jairus Cassius Fairchild; December 27, 1801 Granville, New York, U.S.
- Died: July 18, 1862 (aged 60) Madison, Wisconsin, U.S.
- Resting place: Forest Hill Cemetery; Madison, Wisconsin
- Party: Democratic
- Spouses: Sally (Blair) Fairchild; (m. 1826; died 1866)
- Children: Sarah (Dean) (Conover)^{(b. 1827; died 1912)}; James Blair Fairchild^{(b. 1828; died 1832)}; Cassius Fairchild^{(b. 1829; died 1868)}; Lucius Fairchild^{(b. 1831; died 1896)}; Charles Fairchild^{(b. 1838; died 1910)}
- Parents: Sueton Fairchild (father); Lucy (Hubble) Fairchild (mother)
- Profession: politician, businessman

Jairus Cassius Fairchild (December 27, 1801 – July 18, 1862) was an American Democratic politician and a businessman. He was the first State Treasurer of Wisconsin and the first Mayor of Madison, Wisconsin. He was the father of Wisconsin's tenth governor, Lucius Fairchild. In historical documents, he is often referred to as "J. C. Fairchild" and his first name is sometimes misspelled "Jarius".

== Early life ==
Fairchild was born in Granville, New York, the son of Lucy (Hubble) and Sueton Fairchild. He moved to Hudson, Ohio, where he was a merchant. In 1827, he settled in Franklin Mills, Ohio, where he built the first brick house in Franklin Township and operated a tannery. He relocated to Cleveland around 1834. He then moved to the Wisconsin Territory, first to Milwaukee, in 1845, and then to Madison, with his family arriving in June 1846.

== Career ==
Fairchild had business interests in cranberries and the lumber industry and was president of the Watertown-Madison Railroad Company. In the referendum to ratify the Wisconsin Constitution in 1848, a concurrent election took place to choose the first state officers. In that election, Fairchild was elected as the first State Treasurer. He was re-elected in 1849 and left office in January 1852. In 1856, after Madison was incorporated as a city, Fairchild was elected the first Mayor of that city.

In the 1857 Wisconsin gubernatorial election, he was a candidate for Governor at the Wisconsin Democratic Party Convention, but lost the nomination to James B. Cross.

== Family and personal life ==
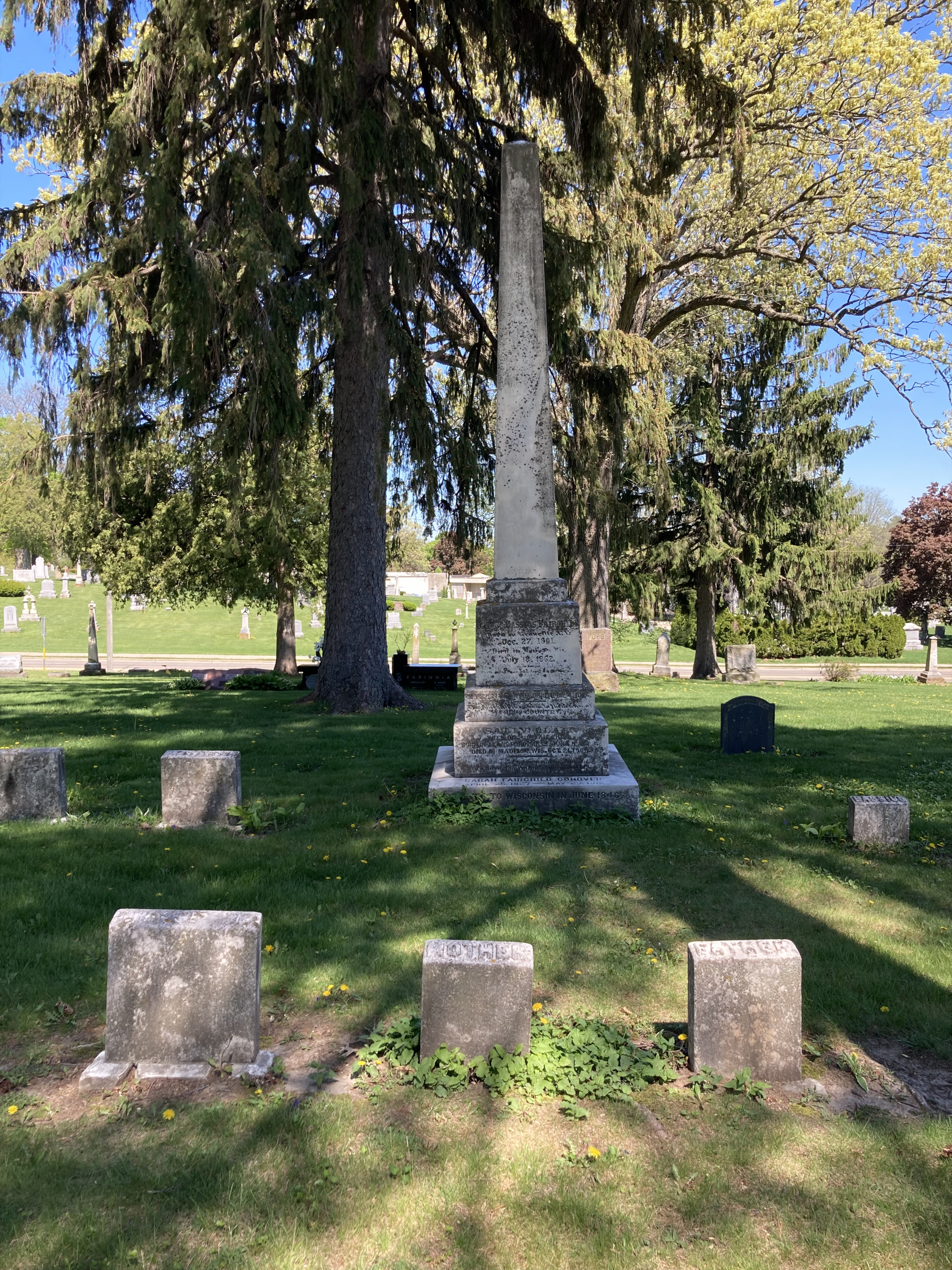
Fairchild's grave at Forest Hill Cemetery

Jairus Fairchild married Sally Blair in the spring of 1826. They had five children together, with four surviving to adulthood. The first four children were born in Franklin Mills, Ohio, between 1827 and 1831. Their fifth child, Charles, was born in Cleveland in 1838.

His daughter Sarah married and divorced Madison businessman E. B. Dean. She later married University of Wisconsin Professor Obadiah Milton Conover. His two eldest surviving sons were also active in Wisconsin politics, with Cassius Fairchild serving in the Wisconsin State Assembly and Lucius Fairchild serving as Governor of Wisconsin for three terms, from 1866 to 1872.

All three sons joined the Union cause in the American Civil War. Lucius and Cassius both achieved the rank of Brigadier General, serving with the Wisconsin Volunteer Infantry. Charles served as a paymaster in the Union Navy.

Jairus C. Fairchild died in Madison on July 18, 1862, and was buried at Forest Hill Cemetery.

== See also ==
- Fairchild family

Political offices
Preceded by Position Established	State Treasurer of Wisconsin; 1848 – 1852	Succeeded by Edward H. Janssen
Preceded by Peter Van Bergen; Village President	Mayor of Madison, Wisconsin; 1856 – 1857	Succeeded by Augustus A. Bird
