= John M. Oddie =

American politician

John M. Oddie (January 29, 1842 – December 22, 1914) was an American farmer and politician.

Born in Burnbrae, Canada West, Oddie emigrated to the United States in 1849 and settled in Vernon, Waukesha County, Wisconsin. In 1872, Oddie moved to Boyceville, Dunn County, Wisconsin and was a farmer. Oddie served as treasurer for the town of Tiffany, Wisconsin in 1874 and 1878 and also served on the Tiffany Town Board. In 1885, Oddie served in the Wisconsin State Assembly and was a Republican. Oddie died at his home in Menomonie, Wisconsin and was buried in Vernon, Wisconsin.
