= The Philadelphia Press =

- Type: Daily newspaper
- Format: Broadsheet
- Founder: John Weiss Forney
- Publisher: acquired by Public Ledger
- Editor: Charles Emory Smith (1880–1908)
- Founded: August 1, 1857; 168 years ago
- Ceased publication: October 1, 1920; 105 years ago
- Language: English
- Headquarters: Philadelphia, Pennsylvania, United States

The Philadelphia Press (or The Press) is a defunct newspaper that was published from August 1, 1857, to October 1, 1920.

The paper was founded by John Weiss Forney. Charles Emory Smith was editor and owned a stake in the paper from 1880 until his death in 1908. During the American Civil War, the Press was published as Forney's War Press and was Philadelphia's only newspaper with news only about the war. In 1920, it was purchased by Cyrus H. K. Curtis, who merged the Press into the Public Ledger.

In 1882, a Philadelphia Press newspaper story sparked a sensational trial after a journalist caught body snatchers from the Jefferson Medical College stealing corpses from Lebanon Cemetery for use as cadavers by medical students.

Before being published in book form, Stephen Crane's 1895 novel The Red Badge of Courage was serialized in The Philadelphia Press in 1894. Earlier, in 1888, Robert Louis Stevenson's The Black Arrow appeared in the paper in serialized form under the title "The Outlaws of Tunstall Forest," with illustrations by Alfred Brennan, before the first hardcover book publication by Charles Scribner's Sons.

== Notable contributors ==
- Emily Pomona Edson Briggs, columnist, notable early female journalist
- Thomas Morris Chester, African-American Civil War correspondent
- Benjamin De Casseres, proofreader, theatrical critic and editorial writer
- Joel Cook, American Civil War correspondent with the Army of the Potomac
- Elisha Jay Edwards, investigative journalist
- George Alfred Townsend, city editor and drama critic
- John Russell Young, chief Civil War correspondent

=== The 'Philadelphia Four' ===
In addition to written contributions, illustrations were also produced for the newspaper. Four illustrators, each a member of the 'Charcoal Club' founded by Robert Henri, became known as the 'Philadelphia Four':

- William Glackens
- George Luks
- Everett Shinn
- John French Sloan

== See also ==
- List of defunct newspapers of the United States
