= Benjamin Allen (Wisconsin politician) =

American politician (1807–1873)

Member of the Wisconsin Senate from the 19th district
- In office January 1, 1853 – January 1, 1855
- Preceded by: Francis Huebschmann
- Succeeded by: William J. Gibson

District Attorney of Pepin County
- In office February 1858 – January 1, 1859
- Appointed by: Alexander Randall
- Preceded by: Position Established
- Succeeded by: Ebenezer Lathrop

Personal details
- Born: Benjamin Allen; August 28, 1807 Woodstock, Vermont, U.S.
- Died: July 5, 1873 (aged 65) Pepin County, Wisconsin
- Resting place: Oakwood Cemetery; Pepin, Wisconsin
- Party: Democratic
- Spouses: Calista Dike; (m. 1834; died 1842)
- Children: L. Jeannette (Day); Mary M. (Darlington)^{(b. 1836; died 1892)}; Leavette (Clapp); Adelia Calista (Gray)^{(b. 1840; died 1908)}; Cyrus A. Allen^{(b. 1841; died 1915)}
- Parents: Cyrus Allen (father); Sally (Fletcher) Allen (mother)

Military service
- Allegiance: United States
- Branch/service: Vermont Militia; United States Army; Union Army
- Years of service: 1861–1863
- Rank: Colonel, USV
- Commands: 16th Reg. Wis. Vol. Infantry
- Battles/wars: American Civil War: Battle of Shiloh (WIA); Siege of Corinth; Second Battle of Corinth; Vicksburg campaign; Battle of Lake Providence; Siege of Vicksburg

Benjamin Allen (August 28, 1807 – July 5, 1873) was an American lawyer and politician. He served as a Union Army officer during the American Civil War and was wounded during two major battles. He also served one term in the Wisconsin State Senate and was the first district attorney of Pepin County, Wisconsin.

== Early life and career ==
Allen was born on August 28, 1807, in Woodstock, Vermont, to Cyrus and Sally Allen. His father was a Scottish American carpenter. He was trained as a cooper as a boy and worked for in his uncle's store. At age 20, he began trading horses, taking them east to the Boston and Long Island markets. With his earnings, he bought a furnace and dealt in iron until 1844. On March 2, 1834, he married Calista Dike. They would have five children before her death on June 6, 1842. He became a U.S. revenue officer in 1844, and studied law under Judge Bowditch, earning admission to the bar in 1847.

He moved west in 1848, first to the Minnesota Territory, then moving to Hudson, Wisconsin, before finally settling in Pepin, Wisconsin, in 1855. He worked to build up the small settlement, eventually maintaining three stores in the village. In 1856 he entered a partnership with H. S. Allen of Chippewa Falls to set up a stage coach line between the two settlements, and built much of the road between the two.

== Political career ==
In 1852, Allen was elected on the Democratic Party ticket to represent the vast western region of the state in the Wisconsin State Senate for 1853 and 1854. In February 1858, Pepin County was created from the southern part of Dunn County, and the Governor was empowered to name county officers who would serve until new officials could be elected to begin the following January. Mr. Allen was selected by Governor Alexander Randall to serve as the first district attorney of the county. Mr. Allen was said to be an admirer and supporter of Stephen A. Douglas.

== Military career ==
Prior to leaving Vermont, Allen had been a colonel with the Vermont Militia. At the outbreak of the American Civil War, he was commissioned colonel for the 16th Wisconsin Volunteer Infantry Regiment. His second-in-command was Lieutenant Colonel Cassius Fairchild, whose brother, Lucius, would go on to become the first three-term Governor of Wisconsin. Colonel Allen's son, Cyrus, also served under him as a 2nd lieutenant in Company G of the 16th Wisconsin.

The 16th Wisconsin mustered into service January 1862 and was attached to Ulysses S. Grant's Army of the Tennessee. They arrived at Pittsburg Landing, Tennessee, where Grant was concentrating his forces, on March 20, 1862. On April 5 they came under attack from Confederate forces at the start of what would be known as the Battle of Shiloh. During the fighting, Colonel Allen ably commanded his regiment, coordinating an orderly retreat to a defensive position in the early hours of fighting. Two horses were shot out from under him, and ultimately both he and Lt. Colonel Fairchild were wounded in the fighting. Major Thomas Reynolds, who had been under arrest for an infraction, took command of the regiment through the remainder of the battle. Throughout the battle, the regiment conducted itself professionally, despite this being their first combat. This was seen as a testament to the training of the men and officers. In all, the 16th Wisconsin suffered 40 dead and 188 wounded at the Battle of Shiloh.

Lt. Colonel Fairchild's wound was in his hip and was so severe that he had to be sent back to Wisconsin for surgery and recuperation. Colonel Allen's wound was in his arm, and he was able to recuperate with the Regiment as they stationed in the vicinity Pittsburg Landing. On May 1, he led the regiment to the vicinity of Corinth, Mississippi, and participated in laying siege to that city. During the siege and for some months after, their superior, Brigadier General John McArthur was elevated to command of their Division, and thus Colonel Allen was elevated to command of the brigade, and Major Reynolds was left in command of the 16th Wisconsin. After the successful taking of Corinth, Colonel Allen's brigade was engaged in maneuvers against Confederate forces still in the area, but before they could concentrate, another force of Union soldiers encountered the enemy at Iuka. After Iuka, it became apparent that the enemy was concentrating for another push toward Corinth. Allen's brigade returned there and formed a defensive position. At this Second Battle of Corinth, they again conducted orderly retreats to strong defensive positions, then repelled waves of Confederate attackers.

Due to the depletion of the regiment, a consolidation was ordered and the regiment was mostly stationary on guard duty through the winter of 1862-63. Colonel Allen returned to Wisconsin during this time to recuperate from his wounds, but would return in April 1863. A month later, they were rejoined by their lieutenant colonel, Cassius Fairchild. The two men would lead the regiment through most of Grant's Vicksburg campaign, during which they were billeted at Lake Providence. After the surrender of Vicksburg, however, Colonel Allen, who was still suffering from the effects of his wound taken at Shiloh, chose to retire. Lt. Colonel Fairchild would take command of the regiment through the remainder of the war.

== Postbellum years ==
Colonel Allen returned to his private affairs after the war and resumed operation of his several stores in Pepin. He died there in 1873 and was interred at Pepin's Oakwood Cemetery.
