= Friendship House (Washington, D.C.) =

Historic house in Washington, D.C., United States

- U.S. National Register of Historic Places
- U.S. Historic district – Contributing property
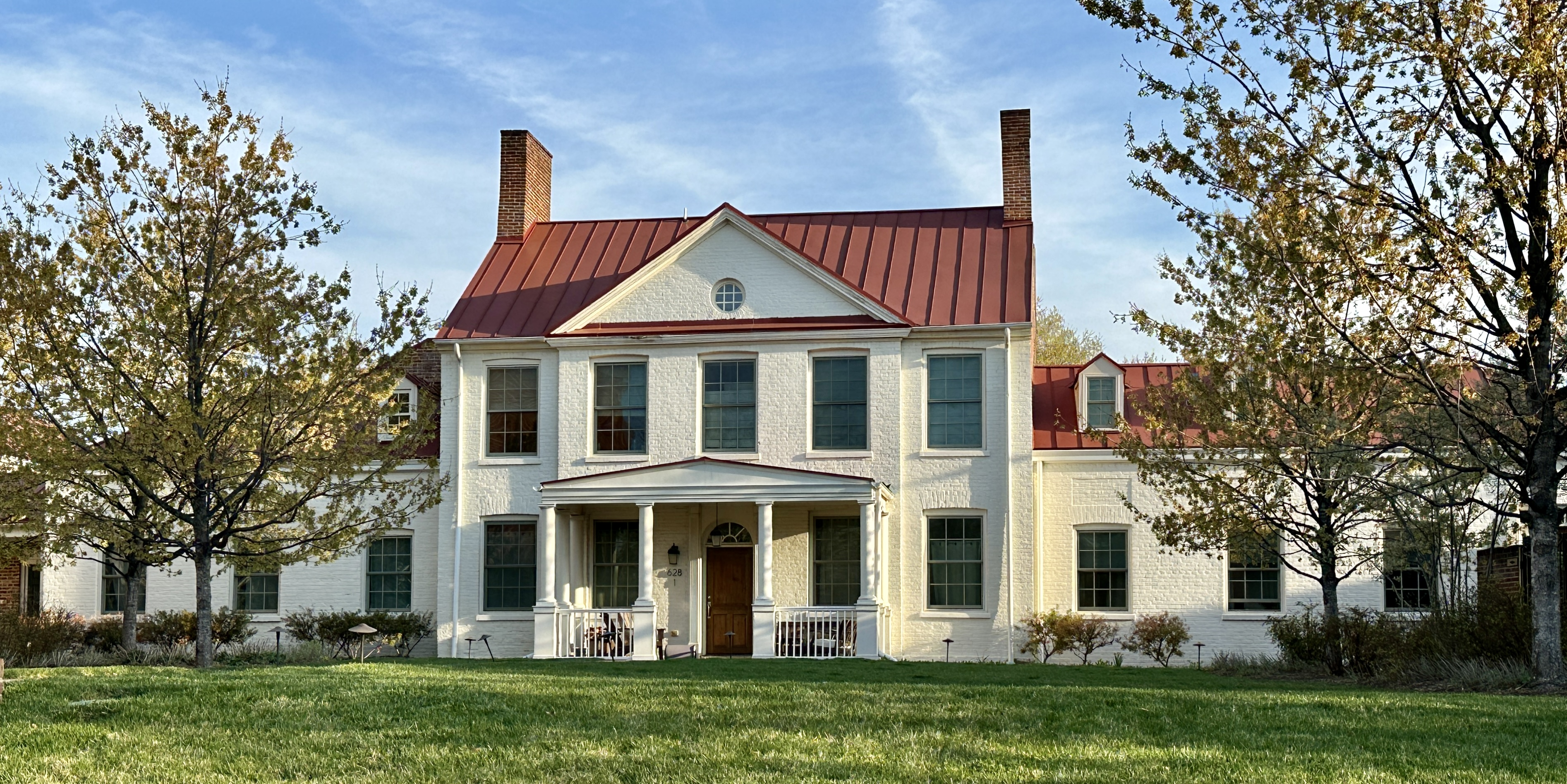
- Friendship House in 2026

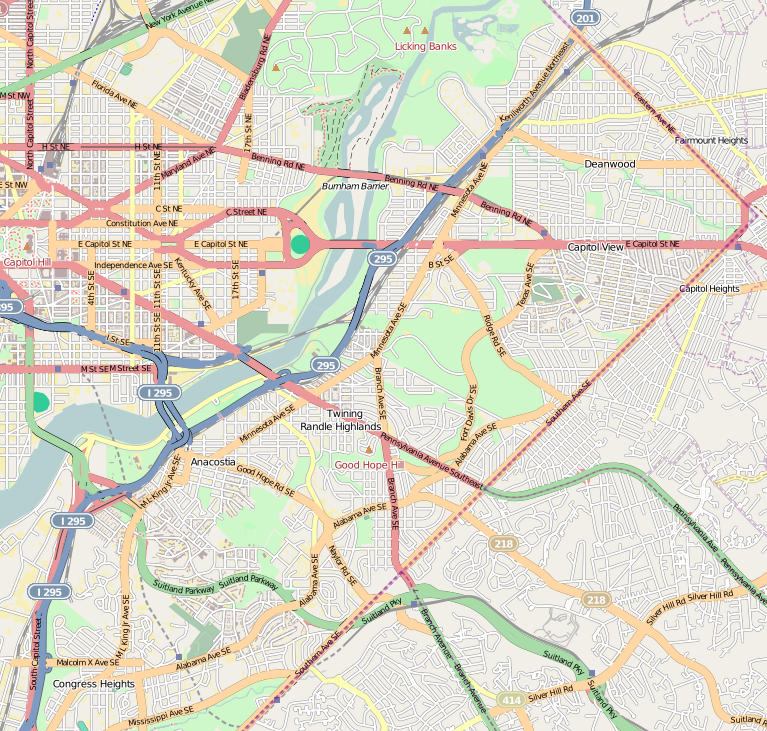
- Location within Washington, D.C. Location within the District of Columbia Location within the United States
- Location: 619 D Street, or 630 South Carolina Avenue, S.E., Washington, D.C.
- Coordinates: 38°53′2″N 76°59′53″W
- Built: 1795
- Architectural style: Georgian
- NRHP reference No.: 73002086
- Added to NRHP: January 18, 1973

Friendship House (also known as The Maples, Maple Square, or Duncanson House) is a Georgian townhouse, located at 619 D Street, (630 South Carolina Avenue), Southeast, Washington, D.C., in the Capitol Hill neighborhood.

== History ==
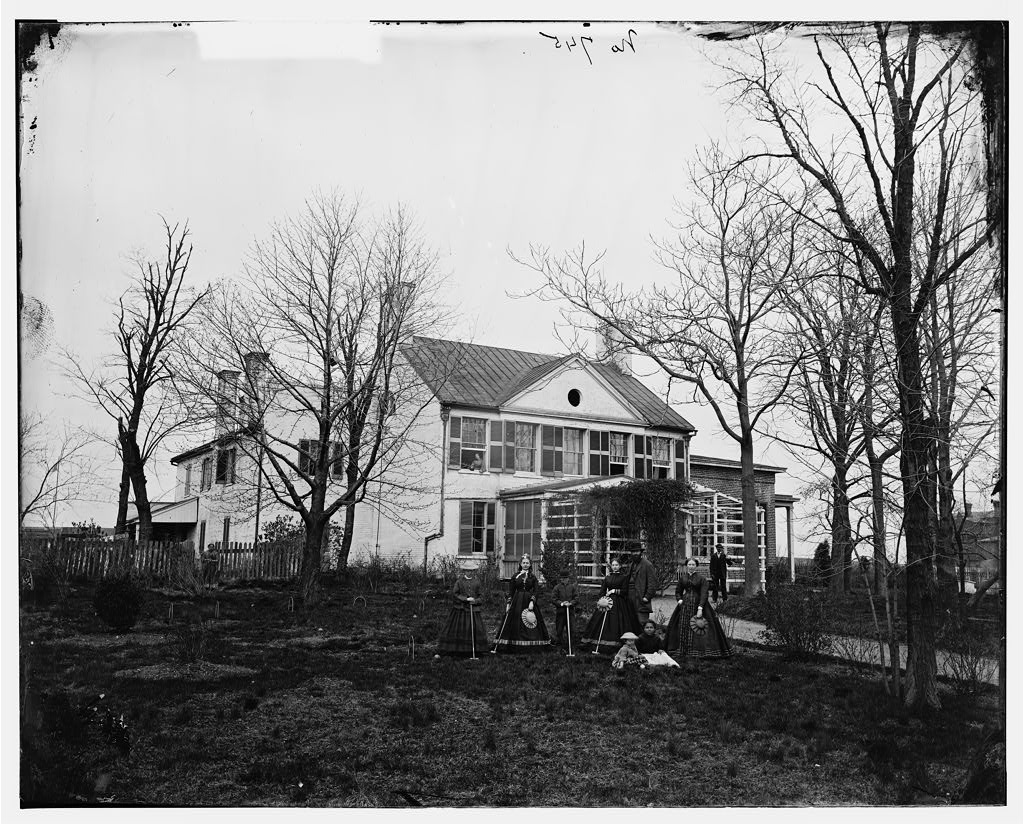
19th century picture of "The Maples" which was also known as the "Patellus House". [Credit "Library of Congress"]

It was designed by William Lovering in 1795.

The first owner of the home was William Mayne Duncanson, whose house guests included George Washington. In August 1814, it served as a hospital after the Battle of Bladensburg. In 1815, it was purchased from bankruptcy, by Francis Scott Key. In July 1838, it was purchased by Major Augustus A. Nicholson. On June 2, 1856, it was purchased by John M. Clayton. He added a ballroom with decoration by Constantino Brumidi. On April 20, 1858, it was purchased by Louis François de Pourtalès; there are rumors of his winecellar. In 1871, it was purchased by journalist Mrs. Emily Edson Briggs; she named it "Maple Square."

The Friendship House Association, founded in 1904, purchased the house in 1936, and operated a settlement house, and community center there. As the Capitol Hill neighborhood gentrified, most of the people served were in other parts of Washington, D.C.

It was placed on the National Register of Historic Places on January 18, 1973. The property was sold in 2010, to a private developer.

== See also ==
- National Register of Historic Places listings in the District of Columbia
- Friendship House
