= Cassius Fairchild =

Wisconsin businessman and Union Army officer in the American Civil War

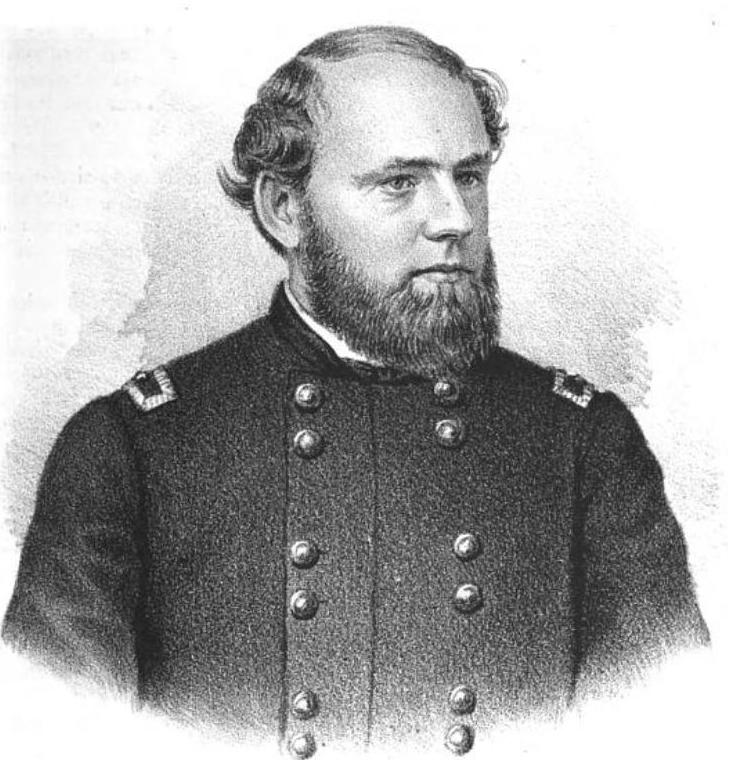
- Fairchild c. 1866

Chairman of the Democratic Party of Wisconsin
- In office 1859–1860

Member of the Wisconsin State Assembly from the Dane 6th district
- In office January 11, 1860 – January 9, 1861
- Preceded by: George Baldwin Smith
- Succeeded by: David Atwood

Member of the Madison City Council
- In office April 1858 – April 1860

Personal details
- Born: December 16, 1829 Franklin Mills, Ohio, US
- Died: October 24, 1868 (aged 38) Milwaukee, Wisconsin, US
- Resting place: Forest Hill Cemetery; Madison, Wisconsin
- Party: Democratic
- Spouses: Mary Cornelia Haney; (m. 1868; died 1930)
- Children: none
- Parents: Jairus C. Fairchild (father); Sally (Blair) Fairchild (mother)
- Relatives: Lucius Fairchild (brother)
- Occupation: lawyer, politician

Military service
- Allegiance: United States
- Branch/service: United States Army; Union Army
- Years of service: 1861–1865
- Rank: Colonel, USV; Brevet Brig. Gen., USV
- Unit: XVII Corps; Army of the Tennessee
- Commands: 16th Reg. Wis. Vol. Infantry; 1st Brig., 3rd Div., XVII Corps
- Battles/wars: American Civil War; Battle of Shiloh (WIA); Vicksburg Campaign; Siege of Vicksburg; Atlanta campaign; Battle of Kennesaw Mountain; Battle of Atlanta; Savannah Campaign; Carolinas Campaign; Battle of Bentonville

Cassius Fairchild (December 16, 1829 – October 24, 1868) was a Wisconsin businessman, politician, and Union Army officer in the American Civil War. He was the brother of Lucius Fairchild, the 10th Governor of Wisconsin, and the son of Jairus C. Fairchild, the 1st State Treasurer of Wisconsin.

== Early life and career ==
Born in Franklin Mills, Ohio (now Kent, Ohio), Fairchild was educated mostly in Ohio. His father was Jairus C. Fairchild, who was the first State Treasurer of Wisconsin and the first Mayor of Madison, Wisconsin. Cassius was the second of four sons born to Jairus Fairchild and Mrs. Sally Blair Fairchild—his older brother, Charles, died at age four in 1832. The family moved to Cleveland two years later, where Cassius received most of his education and upbringing.

At age fourteen, he traveled to the Wisconsin Territory with his uncle, Franklin J. Blair, arriving in the vicinity of Milwaukee. He decided to enter school in Waukesha, and attended the Prairieville Academy (now Carroll University). His parents and siblings followed in 1846, settling in Madison, Wisconsin. Two years later, when Wisconsin became a State, his father, Jairus Fairchild, was elected the first State Treasurer. Jairus Fairchild invested in cranberry farms, lumber interests, and real estate. Within a decade, Cassius would be charged with managing these family businesses.

In the 1850s, Cassius Fairchild was elected several times to the Madison City Council, where he served one year as president. In 1859 he became Chairman of the Democratic Party of Wisconsin, and was elected to represent Madison in the 1860 session of the Wisconsin State Assembly.

== Civil War service ==
Cassius and his brother, Lucius, were volunteers in a Wisconsin militia company known as the Governor's Guard in the late 1850s and gained experience that would become useful in securing leadership positions in the coming war. At the outbreak of the war, Cassius was busy tending to the family's cranberry fields in the remote north. After returning home, he immediately offered his services to the governor for the war effort.

In October 1861, Fairchild was appointed major of the 16th Wisconsin Volunteer Infantry Regiment, which was still being organized at the time. He was promoted to lieutenant colonel in December, and the regiment mustered into federal service a month later, on January 31, 1862.

=== Shiloh and aftermath ===
The regiment marched south under Colonel Benjamin Allen on March 16, 1862, and joined Ulysses S. Grant's Army of the Tennessee. Less than a month later, Fairchild was leading his mostly untrained regiment against a surprise attack in the Battle of Shiloh. Fairchild was shot in the hip during the first day of fighting, and was forced to return to Wisconsin. He spent months recuperating, as surgeons attempted to remove the bullet and scraps of cloth that had been dragged into the wound. During that time, he and his father were bedridden in adjoining rooms—his father died that summer. The bullet and remaining pieces of material were finally removed by Dr. Brainerd in December 1862, but after months embedded in the bone, there was significant irritation around the wound that would, years later, result in Fairchild's death.

=== Sherman's Army ===
After removing the irritants, Lt. Colonel Fairchild was able to recover well enough to rejoin his regiment in May 1863, though still limited in his abilities. He returned in time to join the regiment at the Siege of Vicksburg. After Vicksburg, his superior officer, Colonel Allen, chose to retire. He, too, had been wounded at Shiloh and had not fully recuperated from the wound. On March 17, 1864, Fairchild was made Colonel of the Regiment.

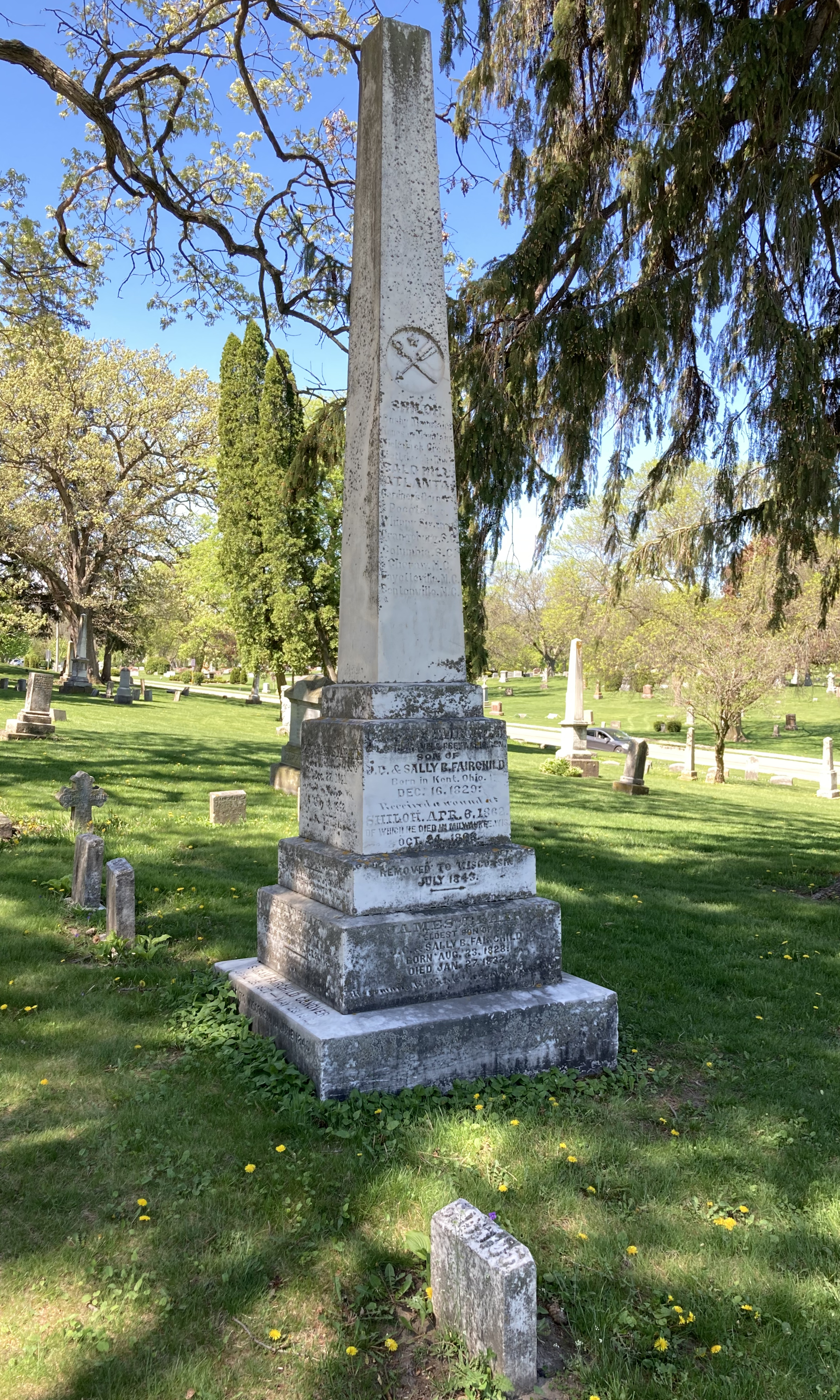
Fairchild's grave at Forest Hill Cemetery

The Army of the Tennessee was now under William Tecumseh Sherman's command and was engaged in a campaign into the southern heartland. As Colonel, Fairchild led the regiment through Kennesaw Mountain, the Battle of Atlanta, and Sherman's March to the Sea. On March 13, 1865, Fairchild was given a brevet to Brigadier General and commanded a Brigade composed of five regiments during the Battle of Bentonville. A few weeks later, the war ended and Fairchild mustered out of the service.

== Postbellum years ==
Just months after the end of the war, in 1865, Fairchild's brother, Lucius, was elected Governor of Wisconsin. The following summer, in 1866, Cassius was appointed United States Marshal for Wisconsin by President Andrew Johnson. He moved to Milwaukee and performed the duties of the office until his death two years later.

On October 15, 1868, he married Mary Cornelia Haney, the daughter of the prominent Milwaukee businessman Robert Haney. Nine days later, while serving as a pallbearer at the funeral of a friend, his old wound ruptured and he died. He was buried at Forest Hill Cemetery in Madison.

== See also ==
- Fairchild family

Military offices
Preceded by Col. Benjamin Allen	Command of the 16th Wisconsin Infantry Regiment; March 17, 1864 – July 12, 1865	Regiment abolished
Wisconsin State Assembly
Preceded by George Baldwin Smith	Member of the Wisconsin State Assembly from the Dane 6th district January 11, 1860 – January 9, 1861	Succeeded by David Atwood
