= Forest Hill Cemetery (Madison, Wisconsin) =

Cemetery in Dane County, Wisconsin, U.S.

Coordinates: 43.0633773°N 89.4320049°W

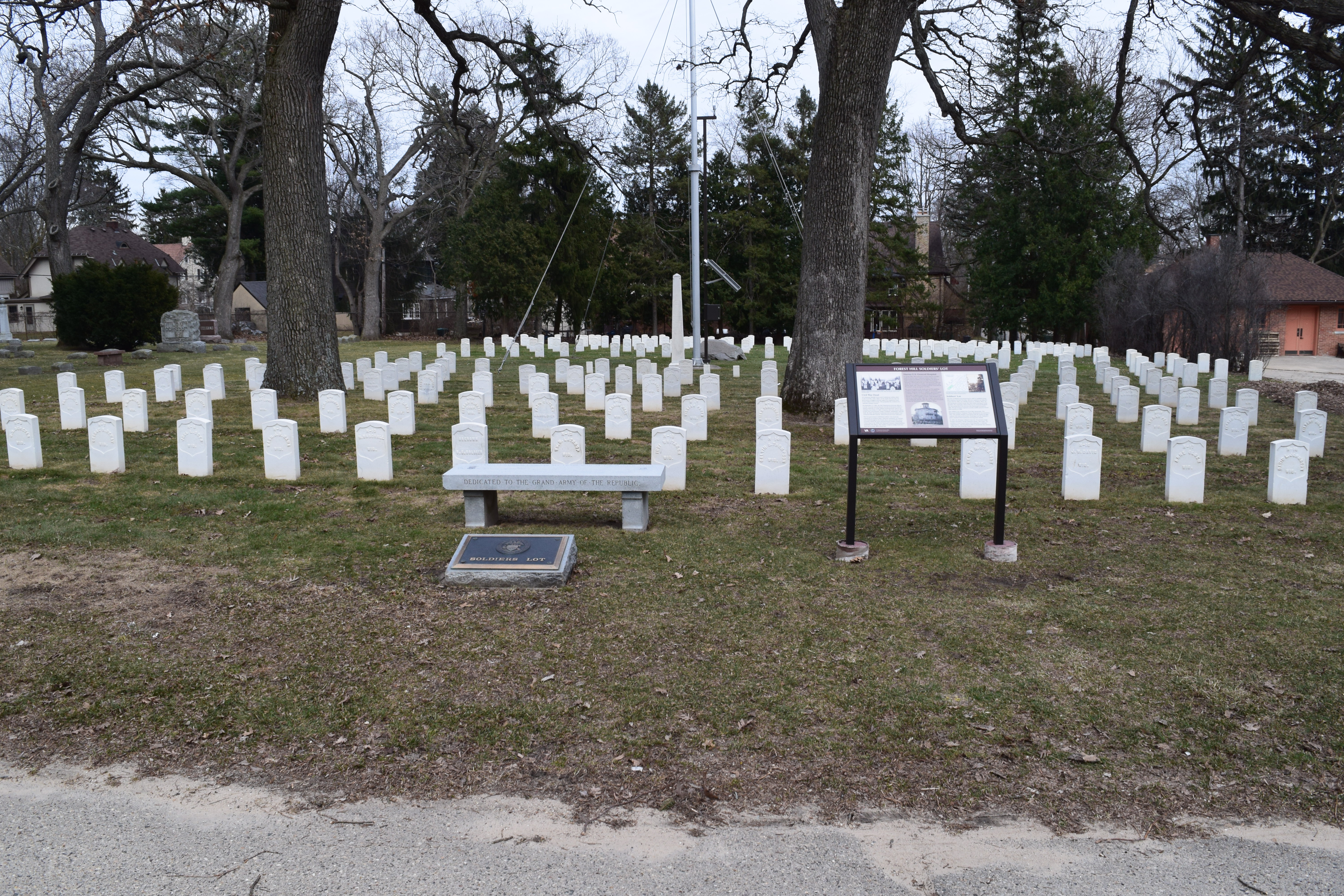
- Soldiers Lot in Forest Hill Cemetery
- Interactive map of Forest Hill Cemetery

Details
- Established: 1850s
- Location: Madison, Wisconsin
- Find a Grave: Forest Hill Cemetery

Forest Hill Cemetery is located in Madison, Wisconsin, and was one of the first U.S. National Cemeteries established in Wisconsin.

== Founding of cemetery ==
After the first permanent European-American settlers arrived in Madison in the 1830s, the first non-native burials occurred on the current University of Wisconsin–Madison campus, near Bascom Hill. In the following years other areas within the area were established as informal burying grounds and the first official village cemetery was established in 1847 near what is now Orton Park.

In the mid-1850s, a committee was formed to search for another appropriate site in the area to form an official Madison cemetery. The committee members chose the current site, then on the far west side of the city and subsequently bought the original 80 acres (320,000 m^{2}) of land for $10,000 from John and Mary Wright. The Wrights had obtained the land from land speculator James Duane Doty, who had obtained it from Alanson Sweet, a territorial council member from Milwaukee.

In 1863 the city sold a portion of land from the original purchase to the Roman Catholic Societies for $170. They in turn developed that property into a Catholic cemetery, now known as Resurrection Cemetery.

In the 1860s a receiving vault was built on site. During and following the Civil War, the Soldiers Lot and Confederate Lot were created and in 1865 a well was dug near the plot of Governor Harvey and a windmill was erected over it. In 1878 a chapel was built following a contribution by the family of John Catlin.

== Expansion ==
In 1928, another 80 acres (320,000 m^{2}) were purchased, 60 of which are part of the Glenway Golf Course directly behind the present cemetery.

== Effigy mounds ==
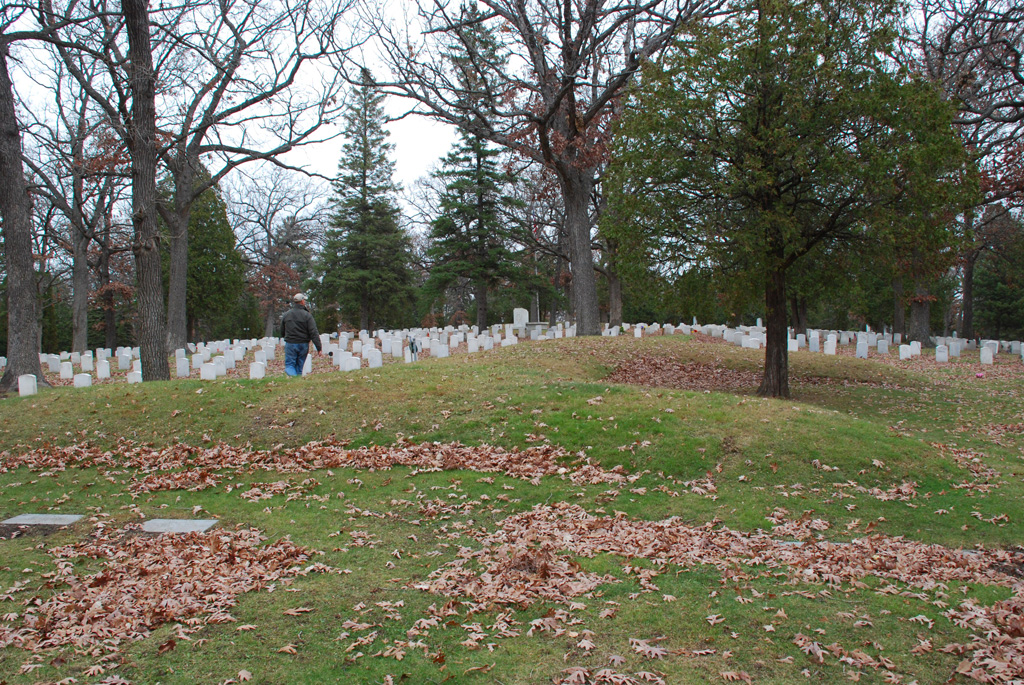
Architectural historian Gary Tipler traverses a panther effigy mound in Forest Hill Cemetery, 2008

The cemetery protects seven precontact effigy mounds, dating from 700 to 1200 CE. The earthworks are shaped like a goose flying down a slope toward Lake Wingra, two panthers, and a linear shape. Three more linear mounds have been destroyed by cemetery development and the goose's head was destroyed by grading for the railroad. The mound group is listed on the National Register of Historic Places in 1974.

== Confederate Rest ==
A section of the cemetery is known as Confederate Rest. On it lie about 140 Confederate prisoners of war who died while in confinement in a Union camp in Madison, Camp Randall, in 1862. A stone marker or cenotaph lists the names of 132 of the prisoners who died in custody. In October 2018, the Madison City Council voted 16 to 2 to remove the marker with the list of buried prisoners, overturning the Landmarks Commission, which had denied a permit to remove the marker, which was built in 1906. The eradication of the cenotaph was seen by some in city government as a "reparation," and was supported by the Equal Opportunities Commission of the city government.

The removal of the cenotaph was opposed by the Dane County Historical Society. The editorial board of the Wisconsin State Journal, noting Confederate Rest is the northernmost Confederate graveyard in the nation, also opposed the removal.

== Notable interments ==
- Henry Cullen Adams (1850–1906), member of the U.S. House of Representatives
- David Atwood (1815–1889), member of the U.S. House of Representatives
- John Bardeen (1908-1991), two time winner of the Nobel Prize in physics
- Theodore W. Brazeau (1873–1965), member of the Wisconsin State Senate and lawyer
- Storm Bull (1856–1907), 33rd mayor of Madison, University of Wisconsin professor
- Romanzo Bunn (1829–1909), United States district judge for the Western District of Wisconsin
- John B. Cassoday (1830–1907), 9th Chief Justice of the Wisconsin Supreme Court, 27th Speaker of the Wisconsin State Assembly
- Orsamus Cole (1819–1903), 6th Chief Justice of the Wisconsin Supreme Court
- Obadiah Conover (1825–1884), linguist, academic, and court reporter of the Wisconsin Supreme Court
- Charles H. Crownhart (1863–1930), justice of the Wisconsin Supreme Court
- Roland B. Day (1919–2008), 24th Chief Justice of the Wisconsin Supreme Court
- Luther S. Dixon (1825–1891), 4th Chief Justice of the Wisconsin Supreme Court
- Lyman C. Draper (1815–1891), 5th Wisconsin Superintendent of Public Instruction, secretary of the Wisconsin Historical Society
- Ben C. Eastman (1812–1856), member of the U.S. House of Representatives
- Cassius Fairchild (1829–1868), Union Army officer, wounded at Shiloh, member of the Wisconsin State Assembly
- Jairus C. Fairchild (1801–1862), first State Treasurer of Wisconsin, first Mayor of Madison
- Lucius Fairchild (1831–1896), 10th Governor of Wisconsin, U.S. Minister to Spain, Union Army officer, wounded at Gettysburg
- Frank L. Gilbert (1864–1930), 19th Attorney General of Wisconsin
- Charles R. Gill (1830–1883), 9th Attorney General of Wisconsin, Union Army officer
- Harry Harlow (1905–1981), psychologist
- Louis P. Harvey (1820–1862), 7th Governor of Wisconsin, died in office
- Nils P. Haugen (1849–1931), U.S. Representative from Wisconsin
- Nathan Heffernan (1920–2007), 23rd Chief Justice of the Wisconsin Supreme Court
- Benjamin F. Hopkins (1829–1870), member of the U.S. House of Representatives, died in office
- James C. Hopkins (1819–1877), United States district judge for the Western District of Wisconsin
- John Wayles Jefferson (1835–1892), Union Army officer, grandson of Sally Hemings and (likely) Thomas Jefferson
- Eston Hemings Jefferson (1808–1856), Son of Sally Hemings and Thomas Jefferson
- Burr W. Jones (1846–1935), Justice of the Wisconsin Supreme Court, member of the U.S. House of Representatives
- Belle Case La Follette (1859–1931), activist for Women's suffrage, peace, and civil rights. Wife of Governor Robert M. La Follette, Sr.
- Philip La Follette (1897–1965), 27th and 29th Governor of Wisconsin, co-founder of the Wisconsin Progressive Party
- Robert M. La Follette Jr. (1895–1953) United States Senator, co-founder of the Wisconsin Progressive Party
- Robert M. La Follette Sr. (1855–1925) 20th Governor of Wisconsin, United States Senator, founder of the Progressive Party, candidate for President of the United States in 1924
- Alexander S. McDill (1822–1875), physician and U.S. congressman
- John M. Nelson (1870–1955), U.S. Representative from Wisconsin
- Phyllis Ntantala-Jordan (1920–2016), South African anti-apartheid activist and author
- Byron Paine (1827–1871), Justice of the Wisconsin Supreme Court, as a lawyer he successfully argued the 1866 case of Gillespie v. Palmer which established voting rights in Wisconsin for African Americans
- Silas U. Pinney (1833–1899), mayor of Madison, 1874–76, justice of the Wisconsin Supreme Court, 1892–98
- Frederic E. Risser (1900–1971) Wisconsin state senator
- Alden Sprague Sanborn (1820–1885), 7th mayor of Madison
- Arthur Loomis Sanborn (1850–1920), United States District Judge for the Western District of Wisconsin
- Harry Sauthoff (1879–1966), lawyer, Wisconsin state senator, and U.S. Representative from Wisconsin
- Albert G. Schmedeman (1864–1946), 28th governor of Wisconsin, 41st mayor of Madison, U.S. minister to Norway
- Robert G. Siebecker (1854–1922), 11th Chief Justice of the Wisconsin Supreme Court, died in office
- George Baldwin Smith (1823–1879), 4th Attorney General of Wisconsin, 3rd and 16th Mayor of Madison
- John Coit Spooner (1843–1919), Wisconsin state assemblyman and U.S. Senator from Wisconsin
- William Robert Taylor (1820–1909), 12th Governor of Wisconsin
- Edward Burr Van Vleck (1863–1943), American mathematician
- John Hasbrouck Van Vleck (1899–1980), American physicist and mathematician
- William Freeman Vilas (1840–1908), U.S. Senator, U.S. Secretary of the Interior and Postmaster General
- Aad J. Vinje (1857–1929), 12th Chief Justice of the Wisconsin Supreme Court, died in office
- Ernest Warner (1868–1930), Wisconsin legislator, namesake of Madison's Warner Park
- Thomas T. Whittlesey (1798–1868), U.S. Representative from Connecticut
- Emmert L. Wingert (1899–1971), Wisconsin Supreme Court Justice
