= Stoddard Martin =

American politician (1811–1865)

Stoddard H. Martin

Member of the Wisconsin State Assembly from the Milwaukee 4th district
- In office January 1, 1849 – January 7, 1850
- Preceded by: Leonard P. Crary
- Succeeded by: John E. Cameron

Personal details
- Born: January 6, 1811 Ferrisburgh, Vermont, U.S.
- Died: July 30, 1865 (aged 54) Milwaukee, Wisconsin, U.S.
- Cause of death: Tuberculosis
- Resting place: Forest Home Cemetery, Milwaukee
- Party: Republican; Natl. Union (1862–1865); Free Soil (1848–1854); Democratic (before 1854)
- Spouse: Caroline Lucy Kitchel (m. 1834–1865)
- Children: Edgar Harvey Martin^{(b. 1835; died 1903)}; Charlotte Kitchell (Larkin)^{(b. 1839; died 1919)}; Harriet Caroline (Seaman)^{(b. 1841; died 1880)}; Carlos Stoddard Martin^{(b. 1844; died 1914)}; Henry Allen Martin^{(b. 1851; died 1933)}
- Parent: Stoddard Martin (father)
- Occupation: Carpenter, building contractor

Stoddard Hurd Martin (January 6, 1811 – July 30, 1865) was an American carpenter, master builder, and Wisconsin pioneer. He served one term in the Wisconsin State Assembly, representing the south and west side of the city of Milwaukee during the 1849 term. He also served several years on the Milwaukee Common Council during the 1850s, and was president of the Common Council in 1853. Originally a Democrat, Martin served his term in the Assembly as a member of the anti-slavery Free Soil Party, but reconciled with the Democrats and was elected to the Common Council on the Democratic Party ticket after the Compromise of 1850; he joined the Republican Party when that party was created in 1854, and remained a Republican for the rest of his life.

As a carpenter, Martin partnered with Lucien Zander in 1841 to build the first brewery in Milwaukee; in the 1850s, Martin and his partner, John Rugee, were the builders of the Newhall House hotel, which was infamously destroyed in a deadly fire in 1883.

== Biography ==
Stoddard Martin was born in January 1811, in Ferrisburgh, Vermont. He followed his father, training as a carpenter. He went west to the Wisconsin Territory about the year 1836, settling permanently in the Walker's Point settlement that would soon after merge with other nearby settlements to become the city of Milwaukee.

In 1846, Martin was elected to the Milwaukee town board as a representative of the "south ward"—then comprising all the territory in the county south of the Menomonee River and north of the present Greenfield Avenue. That year, the Wisconsin Territory legislature and Milwaukee voters approved the city charter, formally creating the city of Milwaukee.

In 1847, Martin was part of a Democratic Party faction that worked to defeat the ratification of the first constitution of Wisconsin—which had largely been the creation of Democratic Party delegates; they alleged the document would harm the new state by preventing immigration, ruining the state's credit, and driving away investment, and would not provide an efficient and impartial judiciary.

Martin joined the breakaway Free Soil Party, which split from the Democrats in 1848. That fall, he was the Free Soil nominee for Wisconsin State Assembly in Milwaukee County's 4th Assembly district—then comprising the Walker's Point and south Kilbourntown areas of the city of Milwaukee. He was narrowly elected to represent the district in the 2nd Wisconsin Legislature, finishing just nine votes ahead of his Whig opponent in a three-party race. He was nominated for re-election in 1849, again running on the Free Soil ticket, but he lost the general election to Democrat John E. Cameron.

Martin was one of the Free Soilers who rejoined the Democratic Party following the Compromise of 1850. With the support of those former Free Soil delegates, Martin secured the Democratic nomination for Assembly over George H. Walker in 1850. Walker, however, decided to launch an independent Democratic bid in the general election, supported by traditional Democrats in the district. Walker won the general election with about 70% of the vote.

In 1851, Martin was elected a city assessor for his ward, the following year, he was elected to the Milwaukee Common Council. In 1852, the Wisconsin Assembly adopted its first major legislative redistricting, and Martin's home 5th ward became its own Assembly district—Milwaukee County's 5th district. In the fall, Martin again received the Democratic Party nomination in that district, but lost the general election to Whig William A. Hawkins.

In the spring of 1853, Martin was elected president of the Milwaukee Common Council. In 1854, anti-slavery sentiment reached a new climax in Wisconsin, leading to the establishment of the Republican Party. Martin became a member of the Republican Party in 1854; he was nominated by the Republicans for Wisconsin State Assembly in the Milwaukee 5th district that fall, but declined the nomination.

In the latter half of the 1850s, Martin was an officer in the Wisconsin Home Insurance Company, and an incorporator of the Fifth Ward Gas Light Company. He ran again for city council in 1858, but was not elected. In 1859, his construction business was awarded a city contract for $35,400 to construct three new school houses (about $1.4 million adjusted for inflation to 2026).

After the outbreak of the American Civil War, Martin became involved in the relief groups for the families of Wisconsin's Union Army volunteers.

== Personal life and family ==
Stoddard H. Martin was the sixth of 15 children born to Stoddard Martin and his first wife Abigail (née Squire). The elder Stoddard Martin came to Vermont from Lanesborough, Massachusetts, and worked as a carpenter and joiner; he served fifty years as justice of the peace in Ferrisburgh, and represented the area in the Vermont House of Representatives in the 1826 term.

The Martin family were descendants of the English colonist Samuel Martin, who settled in the Connecticut Colony sometime before 1646. Through the children of Samuel's son, William, the Martin family also trace their ancestry to the Scottish king Robert I, believing William's wife Abigail to be a descendant of Robert I.

Stoddard H. Martin married Lucy Caroline Kitchel on December 9, 1834, at Addison, Vermont. They had five children together, all of which survived him.

Stoddard H. Martin died of an acute case of tuberculosis, on the night of July 30, 1865, at his home in Milwaukee.

Martin's home, which he constructed in 1846, is still standing at 418 South 4th Street in Milwaukee.

== Electoral history ==
=== Wisconsin Assembly, Milwaukee 4th district (1848–1850) ===
Year	Election	Date	Elected				Defeated				Total	Plurality
1848	General	Nov. 7	Stoddard H. Martin	Free Soil	236	34.65%	Henry Sayrs	Whig	227	33.33%	681	9
1848	General	Nov. 7	Stoddard H. Martin	Free Soil	236	34.65%	Moses Kneeland	Dem.	218	32.01%	681	9
1849	General	Nov. 6	John E. Cameron	Democratic	373	65.44%	Stoddard H. Martin (inc)	F.S.	105	18.42%	570	268
1849	General	Nov. 6	John E. Cameron	Democratic	373	65.44%	Martin Delaney	Whig	92	16.14%	570	268
1850	General	Nov. 5	George H. Walker	Ind. Dem.	626	72.71%	Stoddard H. Martin	Dem.	235	27.29%	861	391

=== Wisconsin Assembly, Milwaukee 5th district (1852) ===
Year	Election	Date	Elected				Defeated				Total	Plurality
1852	General	Nov. 2	William A. Hawkins	Whig	271	52.22%	Stoddard H. Martin	Dem.	248	47.78%	519	23

Wisconsin State Assembly
Preceded by Leonard P. Crary	Member of the Wisconsin State Assembly from the Milwaukee 4th district January 1, 1849 – January 7, 1850	Succeeded by John E. Cameron
