= George H. Walker =

Co-founder of Milwaukee, Wisconsin

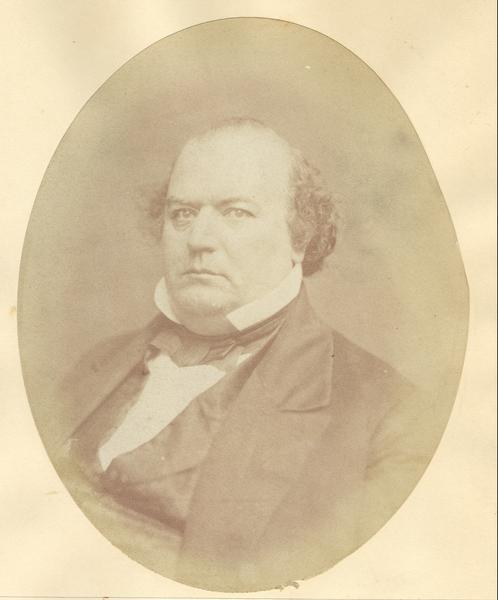
- 1856 portrait by Fuller and Johnson

5th & 7th Mayor of Milwaukee
- In office April 1853 – April 1854
- Preceded by: Hans Crocker
- Succeeded by: Byron Kilbourn
- In office May 1851 – April 1852
- Preceded by: Don A. J. Upham
- Succeeded by: Hans Crocker

Member of the Wisconsin State Assembly from the Milwaukee 4th district
- In office January 1, 1851 – January 1, 1852
- Preceded by: John E. Cameron
- Succeeded by: Jonathan L. Burnham

Speaker of the House of Representatives of the Wisconsin Territory
- In office December 4, 1843 – January 5, 1846
- Preceded by: Albert Gallatin Ellis
- Succeeded by: Mason C. Darling

Member of the House of Representatives of the Wisconsin Territory for Milwaukee and Washington counties
- In office December 5, 1842 – January 5, 1846

Personal details
- Born: October 22, 1811 Lynchburg, Virginia, U.S.
- Died: September 20, 1866 (aged 54) Milwaukee, Wisconsin, U.S.
- Cause of death: Edema
- Resting place: Forest Home Cemetery; Milwaukee, Wisconsin, U.S.
- Party: Democratic
- Spouse: Caroline Pratt Spencer
- Relatives: Isaac P. Walker (brother)
- Known for: Founding Walker's Point

George Haynes Walker (October 22, 1811 – September 20, 1866) was an American trader, Democratic politician, and Wisconsin pioneer. He was one of three key founders of the city of Milwaukee, Wisconsin, establishing the first settlement in what is now Milwaukee's south side. The site of his settlement is still known as Walker's Point. He went on to serve as the 5th and 7th mayor of Milwaukee, and represented Milwaukee in the Wisconsin State Assembly during the 1851 term.

Prior to Wisconsin statehood, he also served in the House of Representatives of the Wisconsin Territory, and was speaker for two sessions of the 4th Wisconsin Territorial Assembly.

His younger brother, Isaac P. Walker, was one of the first two United States senators from Wisconsin.

== Background ==
Walker was born in Lynchburg, Virginia, and moved with his family to Illinois in 1825. The fur trade brought him to the vicinity of the Milwaukee River in 1833, and, on March 20, 1834, he established a fur trading outpost on the south bank of the river; at the time, he and Solomon Juneau were described as the only white settlers in the area, and they both conducted active trade with Native American populations. In June 1835, he laid claim to much of the area surrounding his trade post, which is now the Milwaukee neighborhood known as Walker's Point. Some legal disputes ensued over the legitimacy of the claim, but Walker's claim was upheld by a special act of Congress in 1842.

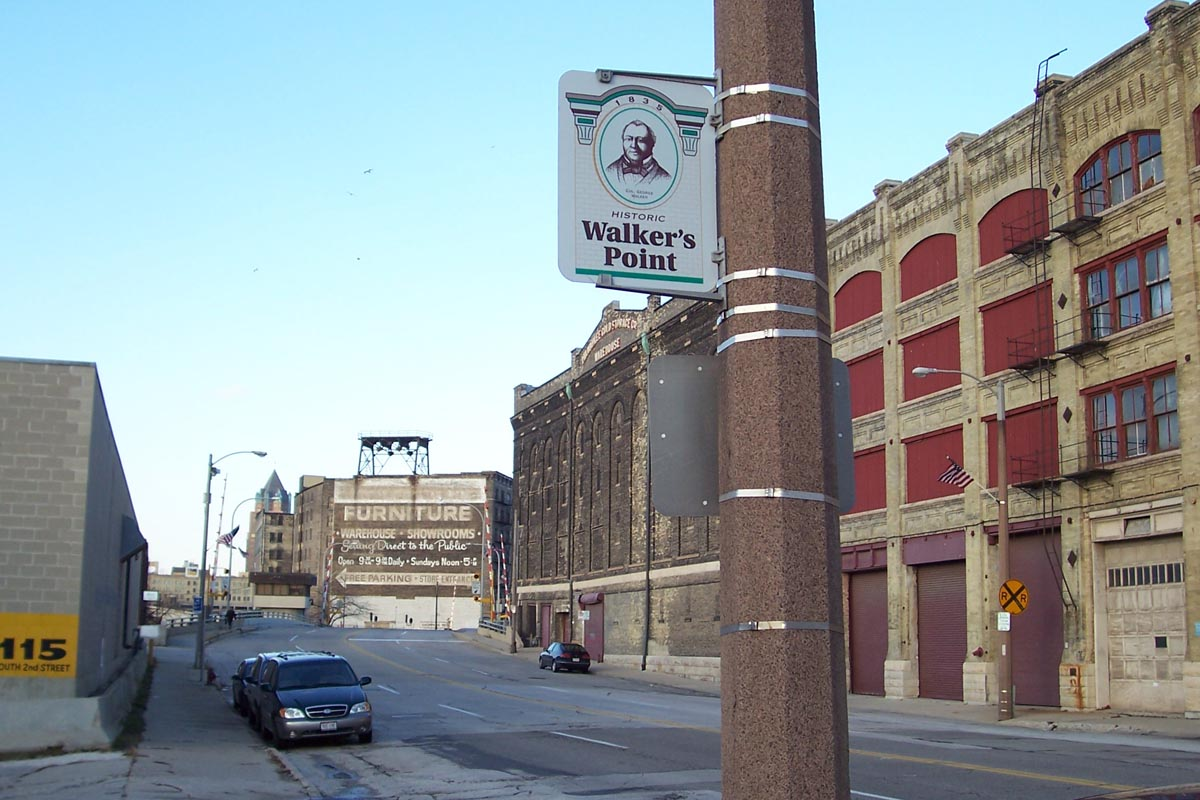
Warehouse District in Walker's Point

Walker's Point became one of the three original settlements that would make up the city of Milwaukee, the other two being Juneau's Juneautown (present-day East Town), and Byron Kilbourn's Kilbourntown (present-day Westown). The three settlements voted to incorporate as a single city in 1846, establishing the city of Milwaukee.

Land that belonged to Walker is now part of the Walker's Point Historic District, listed on the National Register of Historic Places.

== Public office ==
In 1835, those parts of Michigan Territory which were not set to become part of the new State of Michigan— basically the territory that now comprises the states of Wisconsin, Minnesota, Iowa, and the part of the Dakotas east of the Missouri River—were invited to elect members to a seventh and final Michigan Territorial Council (the so-called "Rump Council"). Walker was elected from Milwaukee County, but was one of the four (out of thirteen) who did not attend the "Rump Council" when it met (briefly) in January 1836.

Walker was elected to the House of Representatives of the Wisconsin Territory for the first three sessions of the 4th Legislative Assembly, serving from 1842 to 1845, and was speaker for the 2nd and 3rd sessions. Walker left the Assembly when he was appointed register of the U.S. Land Office at Milwaukee. This was a significant and influential position in the territory, responsible for recording the sale and assignment of new lands in the Wisconsin Territory; he held the office until 1849.

In 1850, Walker was elected to serve on the Milwaukee Common Council, and was elected president of the council when it was organized. That fall, Walker sought the Democratic Party nomination for Wisconsin State Assembly in Milwaukee County's 4th Assembly district. The district at the time comprised all of Walker's Point, along with the southern half of Kilbourntown. At the Democratic district convention, Walker lost out on the nomination to former Free Soil representative Stoddard Martin. However, many of the district Democrats who had remained with the party during the Free Soil split— sometimes called "Hunkers" or "regular Democrats"— encouraged Walker to run as an independent Democrat. Walker accepted their plan to circulate an independent Democrat ticket, and won the election in a landslide, receiving over 70% of the vote. He went on to serve in the Assembly for the 4th Wisconsin Legislature.

During the 4th Wisconsin Legislature, the Legislature wrote a new city charter for Milwaukee with new ward lines, modified taxation powers, and a reorganized governance structure. The legislature also delayed the city election— normally held in April— until May 20, to give time for a referendum on the new charter in early May. The charter referendum was a disorganized mess, with some wards failing to report their results; but only 750 of the 2,219 returned votes clearly indicated approval of the charter, so it was deemed a rejection.

The Democrats' intra-party split— previously on display in Walker's 1850 Assembly election— was highlighted again in the May 20 municipal election. The Free Soil and "Locofoco" Democrats commanded the "regular" Democratic city convention, and nominated Abram D. Smith. The "Hunker" Democrats of the city and the city's small Whig minority nominated Walker at a "People's Convention" held the day before the election. At the May 20 election, Walker prevailed with about 55% of the vote.

Walker did not run for re-election in 1852, supporting Hans Crocker as his successor. In 1853, the Milwaukee elections were dominated by a debate over railroad routes and financing, with local preferences and larger state interests maneuvering to select the route for a railroad connecting Milwaukee to the Mississippi River. Byron Kilbourn, founder of Kilbourntown, was by this time heavily invested in a northern route, benefiting landowners along that route and benefiting his section of the northwest quadrant of the city of Milwaukee; his supporters dominated the "regular" Democratic city convention in 1853, and nominated James Kneeland. Kneeland was also personally invested in the proposed Milwaukee & Fond du Lac Railroad, and accused Walker of having attempted to sabotage the Fond du Lac route in favor of a southern railroad route to Watertown. A People's convention was held again and nominated Walker for mayor. The city split more along geographic than ideological lines in this election, with the 2nd ward in northwestern Milwaukee giving nearly all of its support to Kneeland, but the rest of the city largely supporting Walker; Walker prevailed with about 56% of the vote.

After his mayoral terms, Walker was one of the builders of the city's first street car line in 1859, and was invested in the Milwaukee and Mississippi Railroad, the Milwaukee and Watertown Railroad, and the La Crosse and Milwaukee Railroad.

Although his health was failing through the years of the American Civil War, Walker made a notable appearance at the anti-war Democratic state convention at Janesville, Wisconsin, in 1863, and— with other pro-Union Democrats Arthur MacArthur Sr., Levi Hubbell, and Matthew H. Carpenter— argued for continuing the war until victory.

== Personal life and family ==
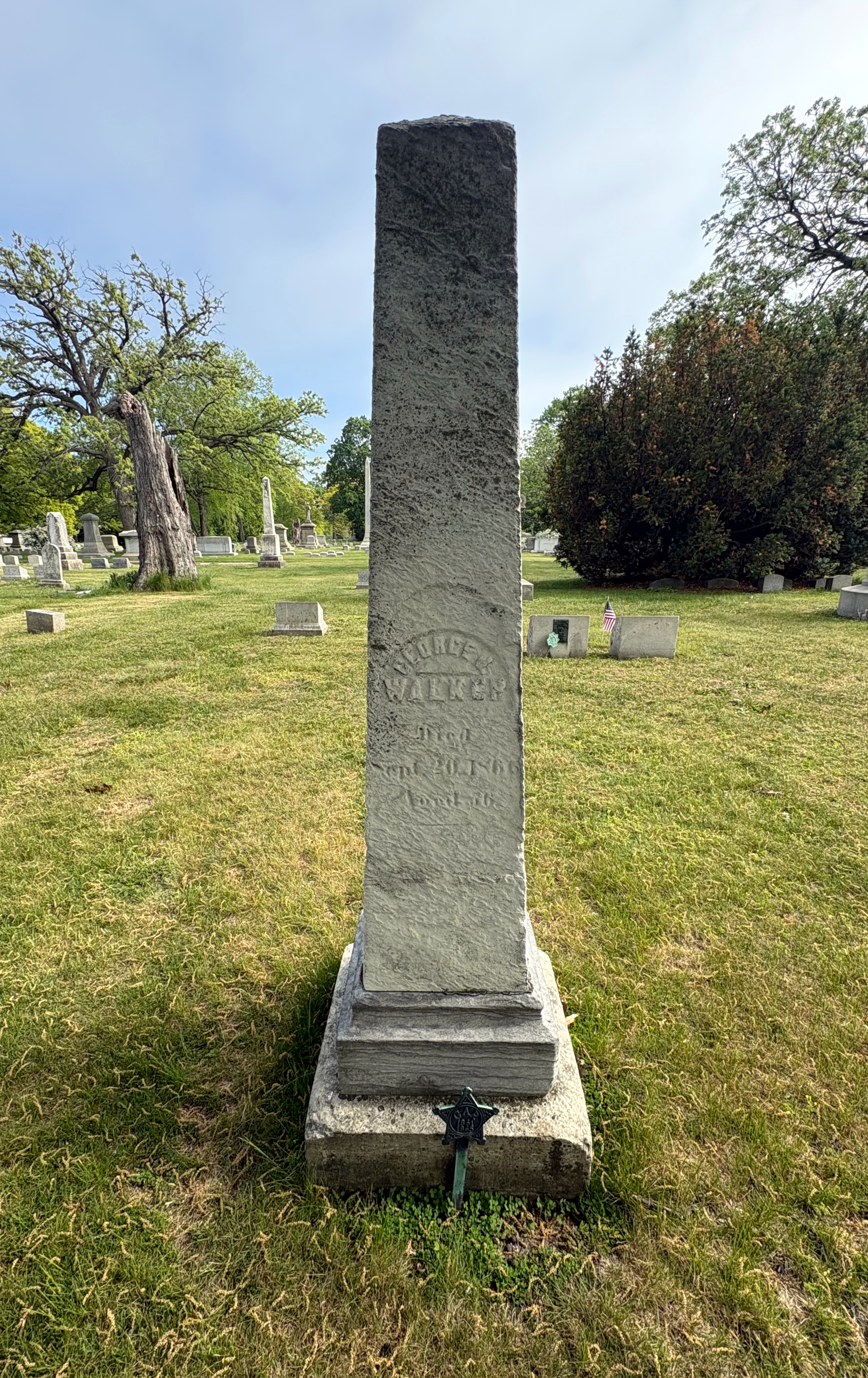
Walker's grave at Forest Home Cemetery

George H. Walker was the eldest son and third of six children born to George Reynolds Walker and his wife Rebecca (née Hamer). George's younger brother, Isaac P. Walker, followed him to the Wisconsin Territory and became a prominent lawyer and politician; when Wisconsin achieved statehood, Isaac Walker was elected as one of Wisconsin's first U.S. senators, serving from 1848 to 1855. Both of Walker's parents and one sister also eventually moved to Wisconsin.

George H. Walker married the widow Caroline Pratt Brown (née Spencer) in the late 1850s. They had no known children.

Walker died on September 20, 1866, and is buried at Milwaukee's historic Forest Home Cemetery.

== Electoral history ==
=== Wisconsin Assembly (1850) ===
Wisconsin Assembly, Milwaukee 4th District Election, 1850
Party	Candidate	Votes	%	±%
General Election, November 5, 1850
Independent Democrat	George H. Walker	626	72.71%	
Democratic	Stoddard Martin	235	27.29%	
Plurality		391	45.41%	-1.61%
Total votes		861	100.0%	+51.05%
Democratic hold				

=== Milwaukee mayor (1851) ===
Milwaukee Mayoral Election, 1851
Party	Candidate	Votes	%	±%
General Election, May 20, 1851
Independent Democrat	George H. Walker	1,841	55.19%	
Democratic	Abram D. Smith	1,495	44.81%	
Plurality		346	10.37%	
Total votes		3,336	100.0%	
Democratic hold				

=== Milwaukee mayor (1853) ===
Milwaukee Mayoral Election, 1853
Party	Candidate	Votes	%	±%
General Election, March 8, 1853
Independent Democrat	George H. Walker	2,083	56.39%	
Democratic	James Kneeland	1,611	43.61%	
Plurality		472	12.78%	
Total votes		3,694	100.0%	
Democratic hold				

Wisconsin State Assembly
Preceded by John E. Cameron	Member of the Wisconsin State Assembly from the Milwaukee 4th district 1851 – 1852	Succeeded by Jonathan L. Burnham
Political offices
Preceded by Don A. J. Upham	Mayor of Milwaukee, Wisconsin; 1851 – 1852	Succeeded by Hans Crocker
Preceded by Hans Crocker	Mayor of Milwaukee, Wisconsin; 1853 – 1854	Succeeded by Byron Kilbourn
