= John Bentley (politician) =

American politician

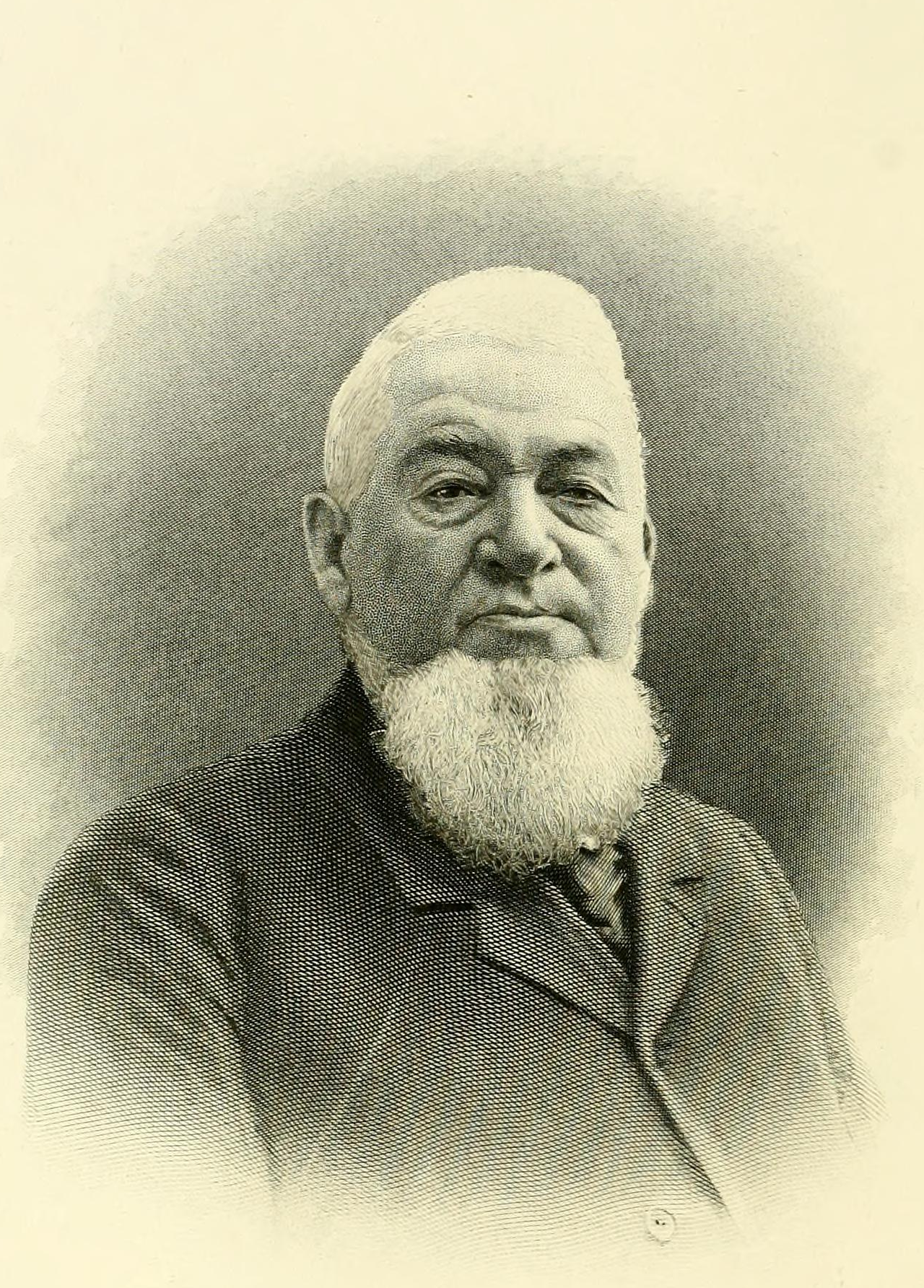
- From History of Milwaukee from its first settlement to the year 1895 (1895)

Sheriff of Milwaukee County, Wisconsin
- In office January 1, 1883 – January 5, 1885
- Preceded by: John Rugee
- Succeeded by: George Paschen

Member of the Wisconsin State Assembly
- In office January 7, 1878 – January 3, 1881
- Preceded by: David Vance
- Succeeded by: Thomas M. Corbett
- Constituency: Milwaukee 5th district
- In office January 5, 1863 – January 4, 1864
- Preceded by: L. Semmann
- Succeeded by: Anton Frey
- Constituency: Milwaukee 9th district

Personal details
- Born: March 23, 1822 Newtown, Wales, UK
- Died: March 5, 1894 (aged 71) Milwaukee, Wisconsin, U.S.
- Cause of death: Pneumonia
- Resting place: Forest Home Cemetery, Milwaukee
- Spouse: Sarah Ann Roberts (m. 1845–1894)
- Children: Ann M. (Smith)^{(died after 1895)}; Thomas R. Bentley^{(b. 1848; died 1910)}; Sarah C. (Lund)^{(died after 1895)}; John F. Bentley^{(b. 1855; died 1875)}; Minnie Clara (Dadmun)^{(b. 1858; died 1938)}; Nellie E. (Millard)^{(b. 1860; died 1885)}; Jennie (Jones)^{(died 1892)}; Mary E. Bentley^{(died before 1895)}
- Occupation: Building contractor

John Bentley (March 23, 1822 – March 5, 1894) was a Welsh American immigrant, building contractor, Democratic politician, and Wisconsin pioneer. He was a member of the Wisconsin State Assembly, representing Milwaukee County in the 1863, 1878, 1879, and 1880 sessions. He also served as sheriff of Milwaukee County during the 1880s, and constructed many notable buildings of early Wisconsin. In historical documents, his last name was sometimes spelled Bently.

== Biography ==
Bentley was born on March 23, 1822, in Newtown, Wales. When he was young, his father emigrated to the United States, leaving him in the care of his mother. He had little formal education and was employed as a child to work as a clerk in a seed store. Through his teenage years, he sought to educate himself by studying in the evenings, and brought himself up to general knowledge.

At age 17, he emigrated to the United States, joining his father in New York City. He worked a number of jobs over the next few years. He was an apprentice plumber and brassfitter in Brooklyn for a year and a half, then moved to in Saratoga County, New York, where he worked for a farmer, who also operated a lumber business on his land. Finally, he moved to Orange County, New York, where he found his trade as an apprentice builder and mason. He worked as a journeyman in Haverstraw, New York, then began to take on his own contracts.

In 1848, he moved to Milwaukee, Wisconsin, and became a prominent building contractor in the new city. His first major contract was for the building of the Milwaukee Female Seminary, followed quickly by contracts for the North Presbyterian Church, and Saint John's Evangelical Lutheran Church. He also went on to construct the State Reform School in Waukesha. He also did mason work on the Newhall House, which famously burned in 1883, and the original Nunnemacher Grand Opera House, which burned in 1895.

Later in his career, he partnered with his son, Thomas R. Bentley, and worked on a number of significant projects around the state and region, including some of the state office buildings in Madison, the north wing of the Northern Insane Asylum in Oshkosh, the Wisconsin School for the Deaf in Delavan, and the Traverse City State Hospital in Traverse City, Michigan. After his retirement, his son carried on the business and went on to other significant works.

== Political career ==
Bentley cast his first vote for James K. Polk in the 1844 United States presidential election, and always afterward identified with the Democratic Party. He was elected chairman of the town of Lake, Milwaukee County, Wisconsin, in 1862, and later that year he won his first term in the Wisconsin State Assembly. In the 1863 session, he represented Milwaukee County's 9th Assembly district, then-comprising roughly the southern quarter of the county. Serving in the Assembly during the American Civil War, Bentley was identified as a War Democrat, and strongly supported the Union cause and raising Union Army volunteers.

He was not a candidate for re-election in 1863, but he was later elected to four consecutive terms, serving in the 1878, 1879, and 1880 sessions, representing Milwaukee County's 5th Assembly district, which in those years comprised the southeast quadrant of the city of Milwaukee. His chief accomplishment in the Assembly was bringing Milwaukee the state normal school—the predecessor to the University of Wisconsin–Milwaukee.

In 1880, he was the Democratic nominee for sheriff of Milwaukee County, but suffered his only electoral defeat in the November general election, losing to German American Republican John Rugee. He ran again in 1882, however, and this time won the office.

His last public office was park commissioner of the city of Milwaukee, having been appointed by Mayor Thomas H. Brown in 1889. He held that office until his death.

Bentley died at his home in Milwaukee on March 5, 1894, after suffering from pneumonia.

== Personal life and family ==
John Bentley was a son of Thomas Bentley and his wife Jane (née Jones). After emigrating to the United States, Thomas Bentley worked in manufacturing woolen goods in New Jersey until coming to live with his son in Milwaukee in the 1860s.

John Bentley married Sarah Ann Roberts, whose parents were English emigrants, on May 17, 1845. They had eight children together, though only four of his children survived him.

== Electoral history ==
=== Wisconsin Assembly (1877, 1878, 1879) ===
Wisconsin Assembly, Milwaukee 5th District Election, 1877
Party	Candidate	Votes	%	±%
General Election, November 6, 1877
Democratic	John Bentley	1,018	66.54%	
Republican	William R. Allen	454	40.11%	
Socialist Labor	Robert Stall	58	3.79%	
Plurality		564	36.86%	
Total votes		1,530	100.0%	
Democratic hold				

Wisconsin Assembly, Milwaukee 5th District Election, 1878
Party	Candidate	Votes	%	±%
General Election, November 5, 1878
Democratic	John Bentley (incumbent)	826	51.21%	−15.33%
Republican	William H. Wolf	647	40.11%	+10.44%
Greenback	David D. Hooker	140	8.68%	
Plurality		179	11.10%	-25.77%
Total votes		1,613	100.0%	+5.42%
Democratic hold				

Wisconsin Assembly, Milwaukee 5th District Election, 1879
Party	Candidate	Votes	%	±%
General Election, November 4, 1879
Democratic	John Bentley (incumbent)	996	64.01%	+12.80%
Republican	John Saveland	560	35.99%	−4.12%
Plurality		436	28.02%	+16.92%
Total votes		1,556	100.0%	-3.53%
Democratic hold				

Wisconsin State Assembly
Preceded by L. Semmann	Member of the Wisconsin State Assembly from the Milwaukee 9th district January 5, 1863 – January 4, 1864	Succeeded by Anton Frey
Preceded by David Vance	Member of the Wisconsin State Assembly from the Milwaukee 5th district January 7, 1878 – January 3, 1881	Succeeded by Thomas M. Corbett
Legal offices
Preceded by John Rugee	Sheriff of Milwaukee County, Wisconsin; January 1, 1883 – January 5, 1885	Succeeded by George Paschen
