= John Rugee =

American politician (1827–1894)

Sheriff of Milwaukee County
- In office January 4, 1881 – January 1, 1883
- Preceded by: Peter Van Vechten
- Succeeded by: John Bentley

Member of the Wisconsin State Assembly from the Milwaukee 5th district
- In office January 7, 1861 – January 6, 1862
- Preceded by: Edward G. Hayden
- Succeeded by: John M. Stowell

Personal details
- Born: January 3, 1827 Free City of Lübeck, German Confederation
- Died: March 7, 1894 (aged 67) Redlands, California, U.S.
- Resting place: Forest Home Cemetery, Milwaukee, Wisconsin
- Party: Republican
- Spouse: Malvina C. Palmer (m. 1855–1894)
- Children: Annie C. (Ball)^{(b. 1856; died 1910)}; John Christopher Rugee II^{(b. 1859; died 1911)}; Charles J. Rugee^{(b. 1862; died 1864)}; Frederick Palmer Rugee^{(b. 1872; died 1921)}
- Occupation: Carpenter, architect

John Christopher Rugee (January 3, 1827 – March 7, 1894) was a German American immigrant, carpenter, architect, and Republican politician from Milwaukee, Wisconsin. He served one term in the Wisconsin State Assembly, representing the Walker's Point neighborhood of Milwaukee during the 1861 term. He later served as sheriff of Milwaukee County. As an architect, he and his partner, Stoddard Martin, were the builders of the Newhall House hotel, which was infamously destroyed in a deadly fire in 1883.

== Biography ==
John Rugee was born on January 3, 1827, in Lübeck, in what is now northern Germany. As a child, he emigrated with his family to the United States, settling initially in New York. In 1851, he moved west to the new state of Wisconsin, and settled in Milwaukee. He married Malvina C. Palmer. They had four children. Rugee died of cancer on March 7, 1894, in Redlands, California. He is buried at Forest Home Cemetery in Milwaukee, Wisconsin.

== Career ==
Rugee was a member of the Assembly in 1861. He was also a Presidential Elector for the 1884 United States Presidential Election. In his professional life, he designed a number of churches, grain elevators, and bridges.

Some of Rugee's buildings include:

- Jasper Humphrey house, 634 S Third Street, Milwaukee, 1868.

Wisconsin State Assembly
Preceded by Edward G. Hayden	Member of the Wisconsin State Assembly from the Milwaukee 5th district January 7, 1861 – January 6, 1862	Succeeded by John M. Stowell
Legal offices
Preceded by Peter Van Vechten	Sheriff of Milwaukee County; January 4, 1881 – January 1, 1883	Succeeded by John Bentley
