= Forest Home Cemetery =

Historic cemetery in Milwaukee County, Wisconsin

- Forest Home Cemetery and Chapel
- U.S. National Register of Historic Places
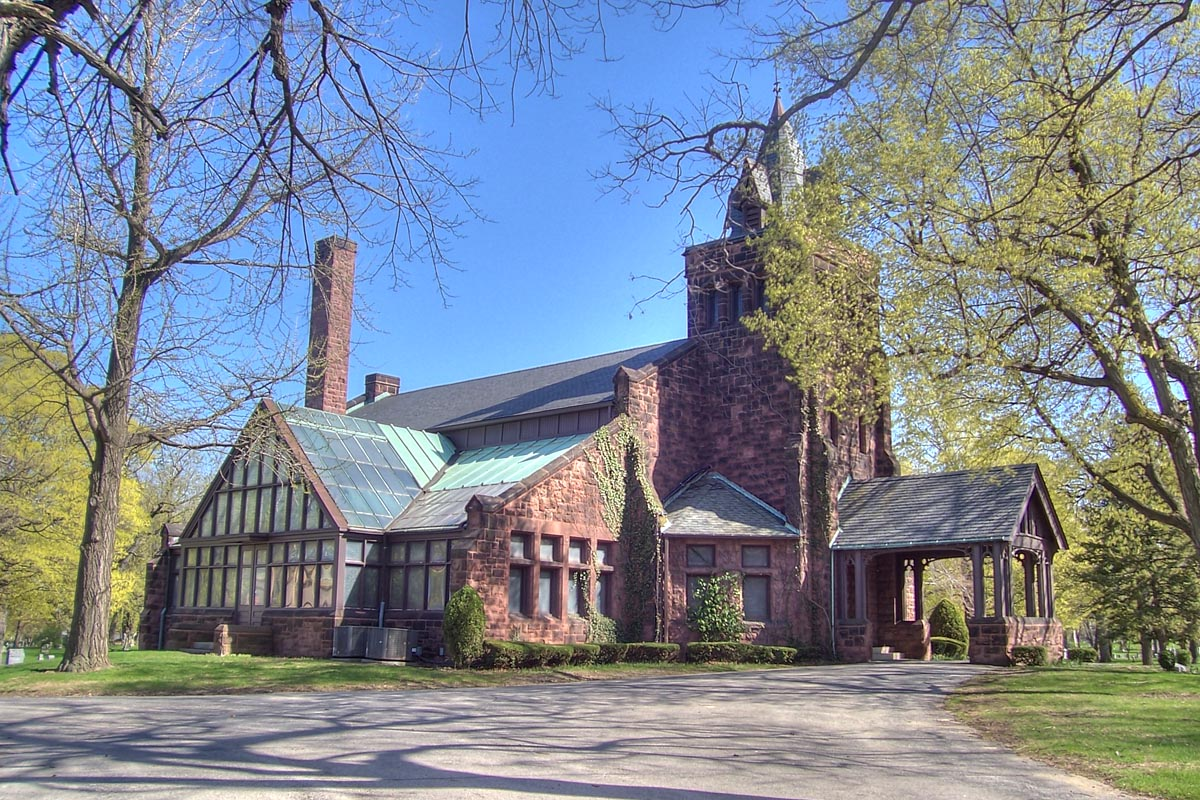
- Landmark Chapel

- Location within Wisconsin Location within the United States
- Location: 2405 Forest Home Ave., Milwaukee, Wisconsin
- Coordinates: 43°00′06″N 87°56′28″W
- Area: 198.5 acres (80.3 ha)
- Built: 1850
- Architect: Lapham, Increase A.; Multiple
- Architectural style: Gothic Revival
- NRHP reference No.: 80000166
- Added to NRHP: November 03, 1980

Forest Home Cemetery is a historic rural cemetery and arboretum located in the Lincoln Village neighborhood of Milwaukee, Wisconsin, United States. It is the burial place of many of the city's famed beer barons, politicians and social elite. Both the cemetery and its Landmark Chapel are listed on the National Register of Historic Places and were declared a Milwaukee Landmark in 1973.

The cemetery is run by a non-profit organization held in public trust. Profits from each sale are reinvested to insure continual care of the buildings and land. Its Victorian landscape contains over 100 species of trees, along with many ornate statues, crypts and monuments.

== History ==
A committee appointed by members of St. Paul's Episcopal Church in 1847 established Forest Home Cemetery on what would later become Milwaukee's south side. When the land was selected it was located nearly two miles outside of the city limits along the newly built Janesville Plank Road (now Forest Home Avenue), in an area believed to be far enough from urban development to remain rural. Increase A. Lapham planned the original cemetery, including the curving roads, in 1850. The 72 acres (290,000 m^{2}) that were purchased in 1850 quickly grew to nearly 200 acres (0.81 km^{2}) by the start of the 20th century. Orville Cadwell was the first burial on August 5, 1850, but was soon joined by others due to an outbreak of cholera in the city.

This location was dotted by Paleo Indian burial mounds and intersected a large collection of effigy mounds known to settlers as the Indian Fields. It contained over sixty earthworks which were catalogued by pioneer scientist Increase A. Lapham, including a rare intaglio of a panther, none of which remains today. An Indian village populated the corner near what is now Lincoln Avenue that grew corn on the hills. They most likely chose this location due to its proximity to the Kinnickinnic River.

Construction of the Gothic Revival style Landmark Chapel started in 1890 and took two years to complete. It was designed by architects George Ferry & Alfred Clas and built using Lake Superior Sandstone, a dark red sandstone found near the Apostle Islands in Lake Superior. A leaded glass conservatory containing decades-old tropical plants extends from the north and south sides of the nave.

Modern improvements within Forest Home Cemetery include two large mausoleums. The Halls of History is an indoor temperature controlled mausoleum and community center. Along with the columbarium and crypts it houses, the center contains a number of permanent and changing exhibits that educate visitors about the history of Milwaukee and over 100 of its people. It is open for walk-ins during office hours. Adjacent to this is a large terraced outdoor mausoleum called Chapel Gardens. It contains above ground burials in porticos set by ornate colonnades, statues, and rose gardens.

== Notable interments ==
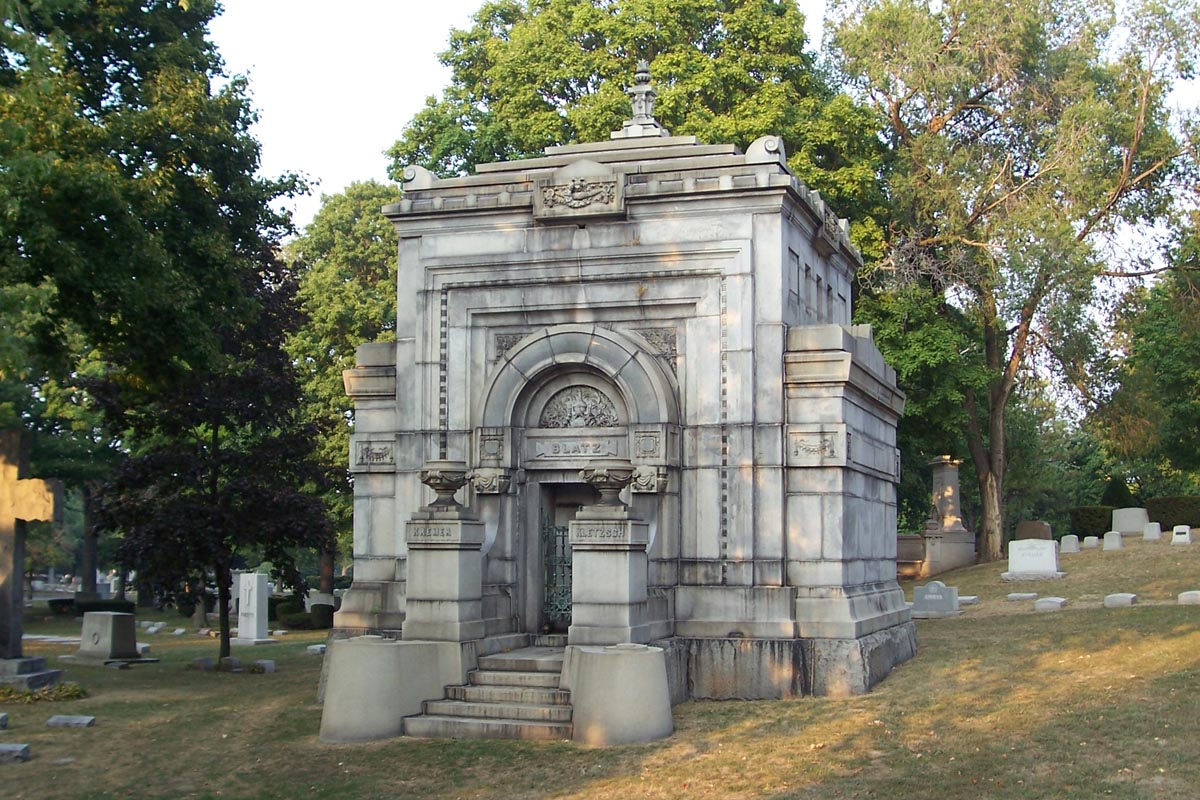
Valentin Blatz mausoleum

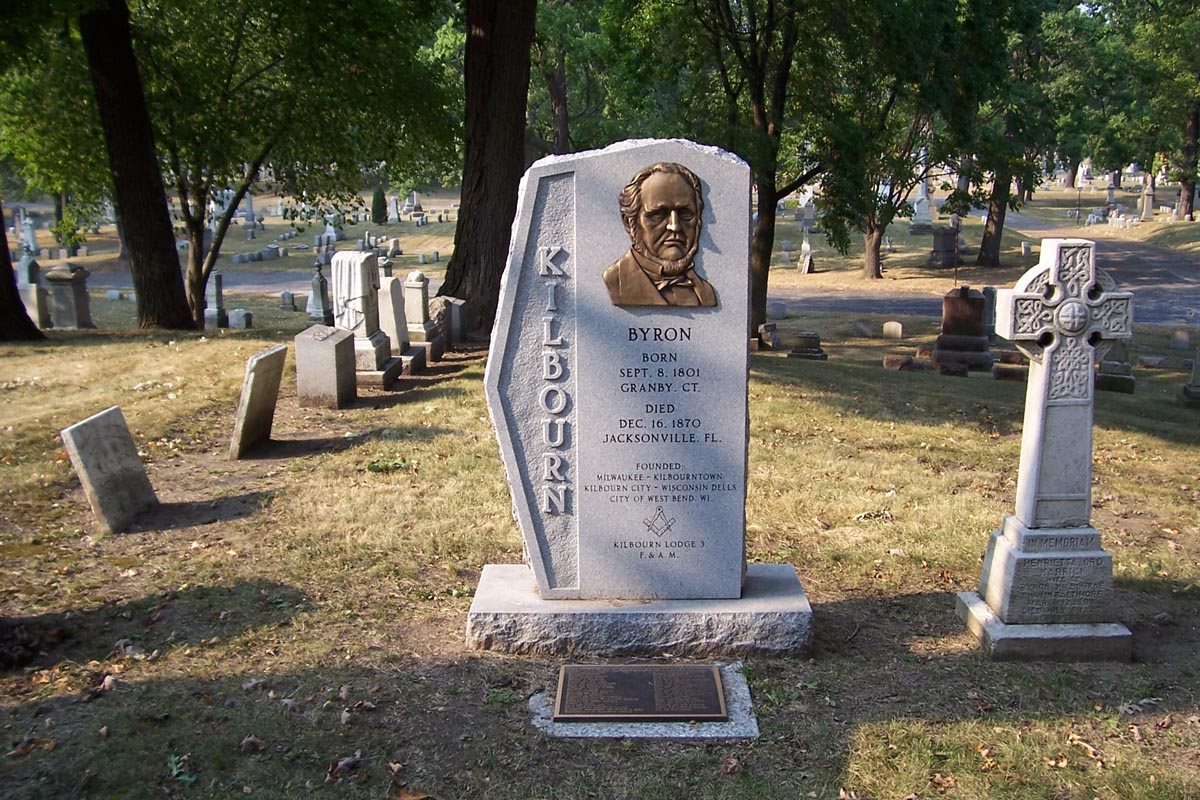
Byron Kilbourn marker

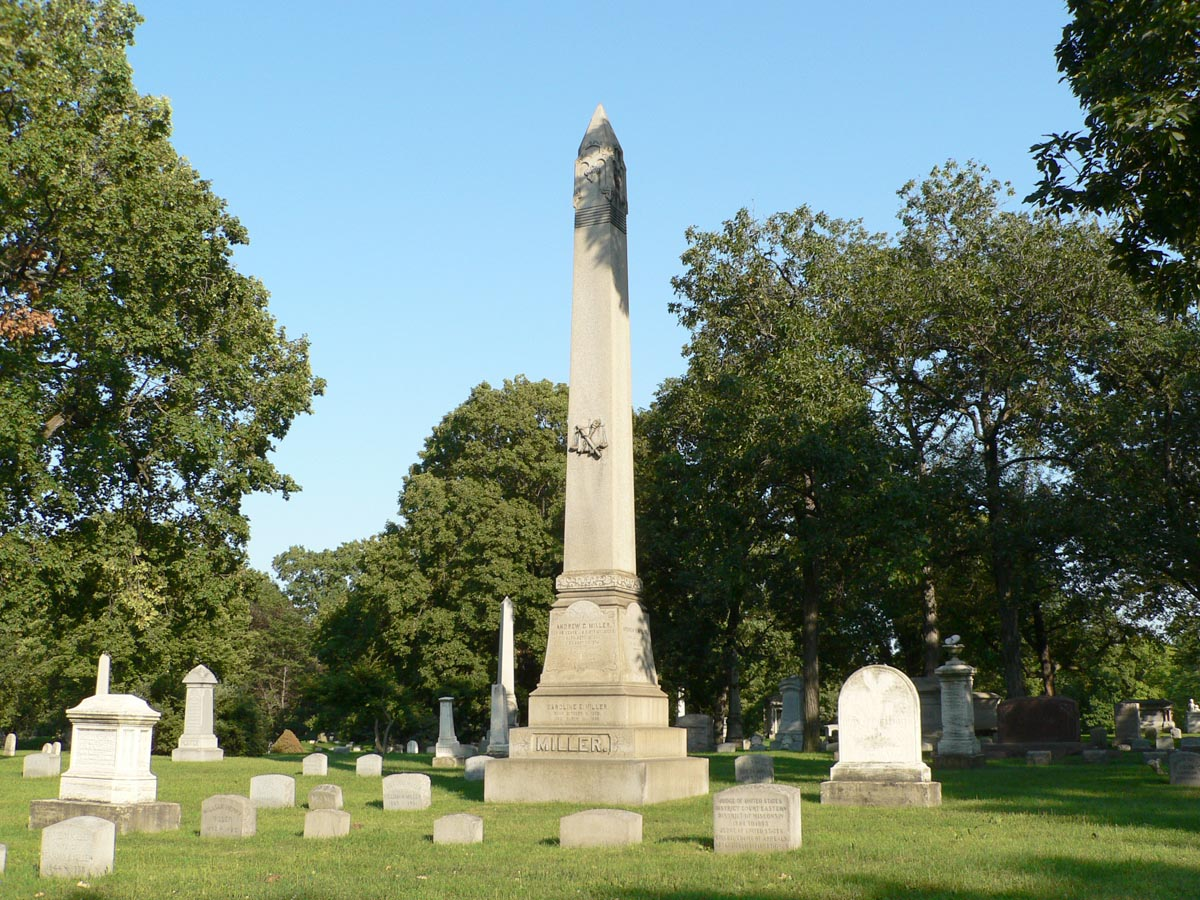
Andrew Miller marker

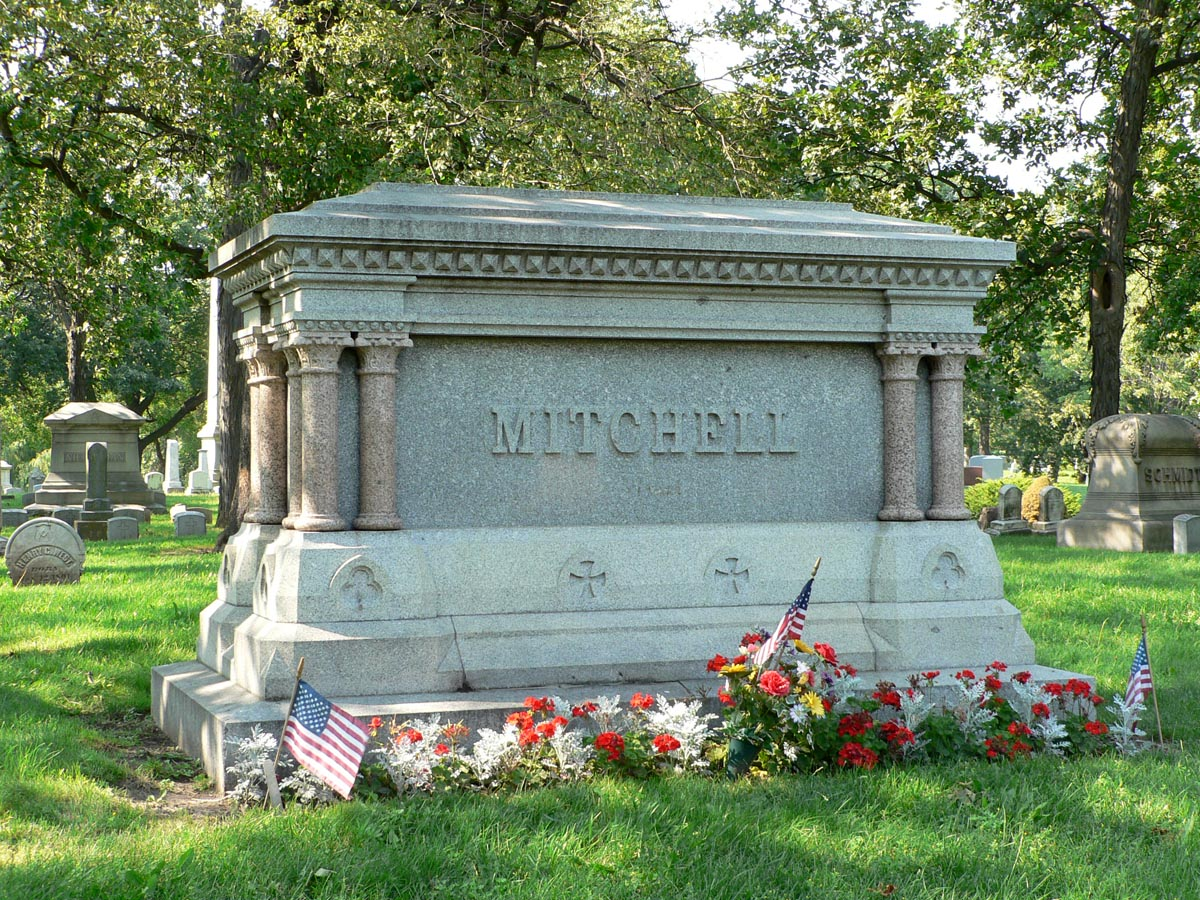
Mitchell family marker

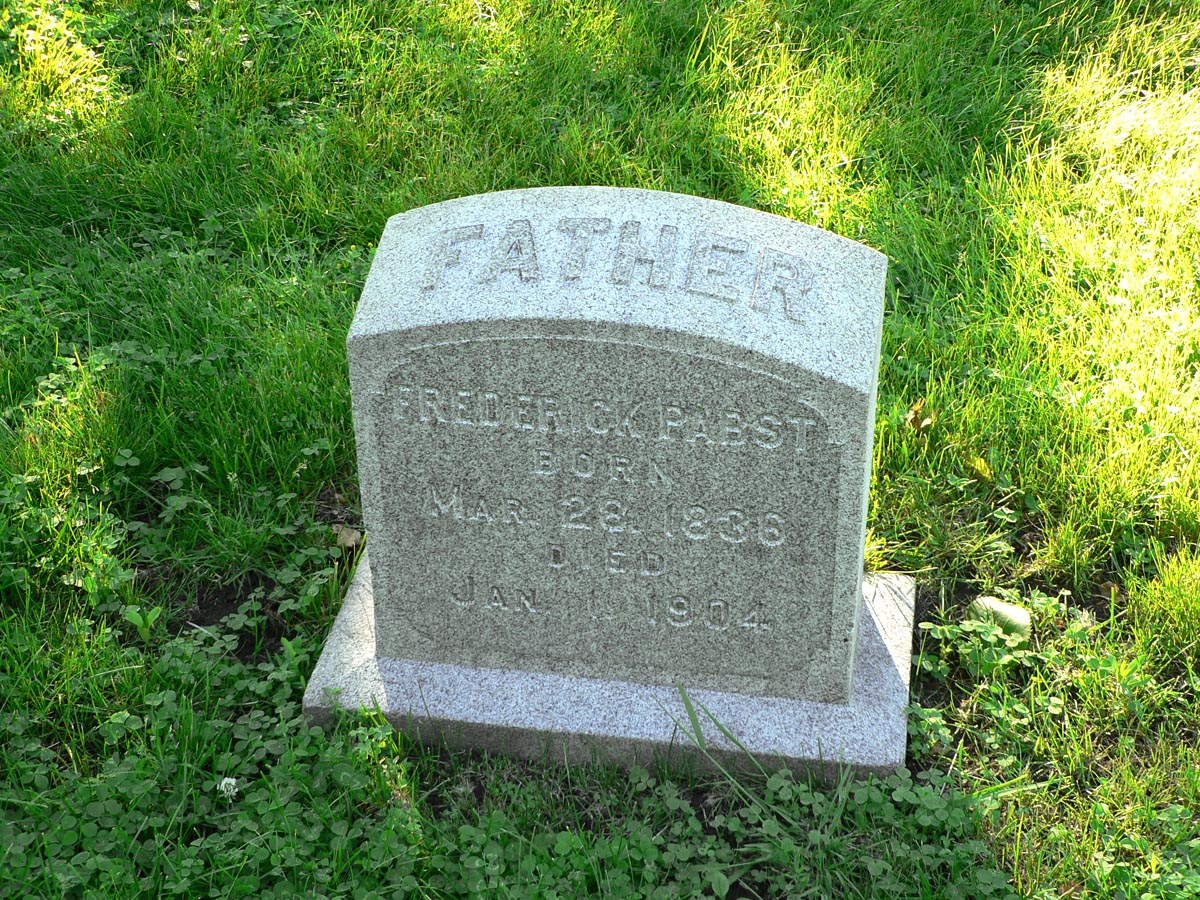
Frederick Pabst marker

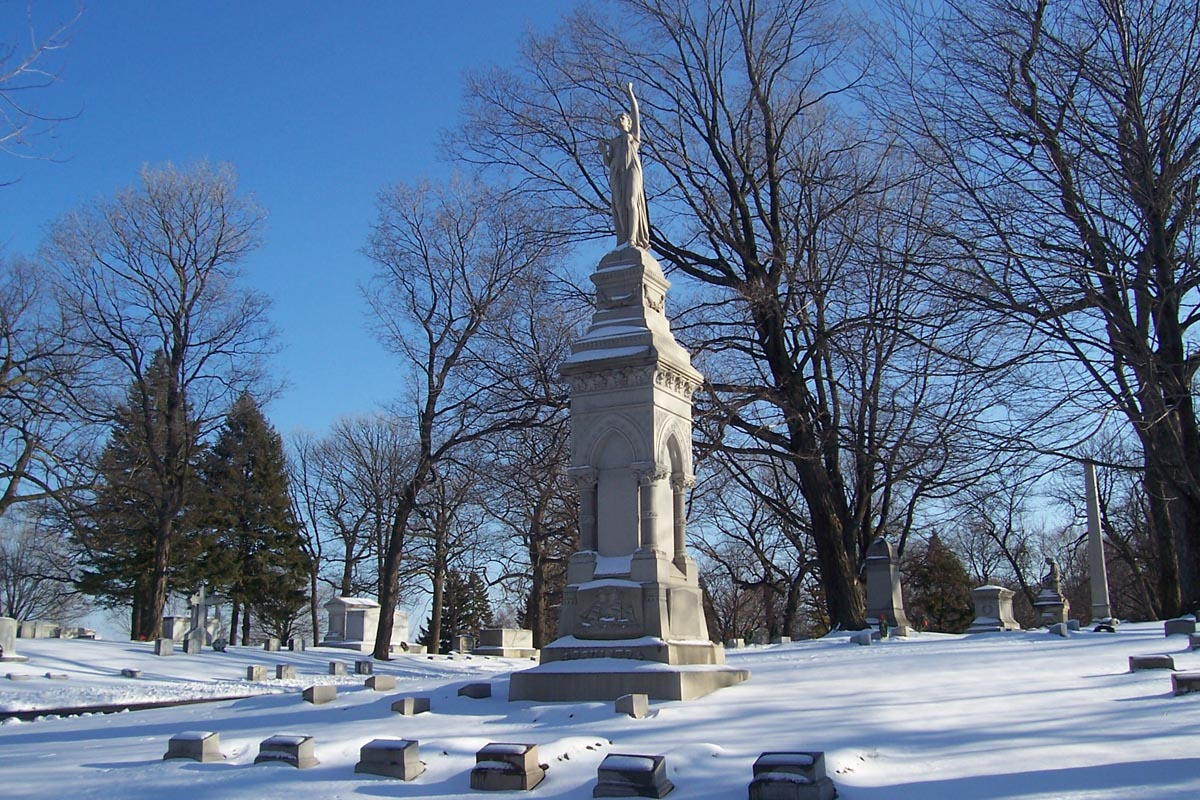
Joseph Schlitz marker

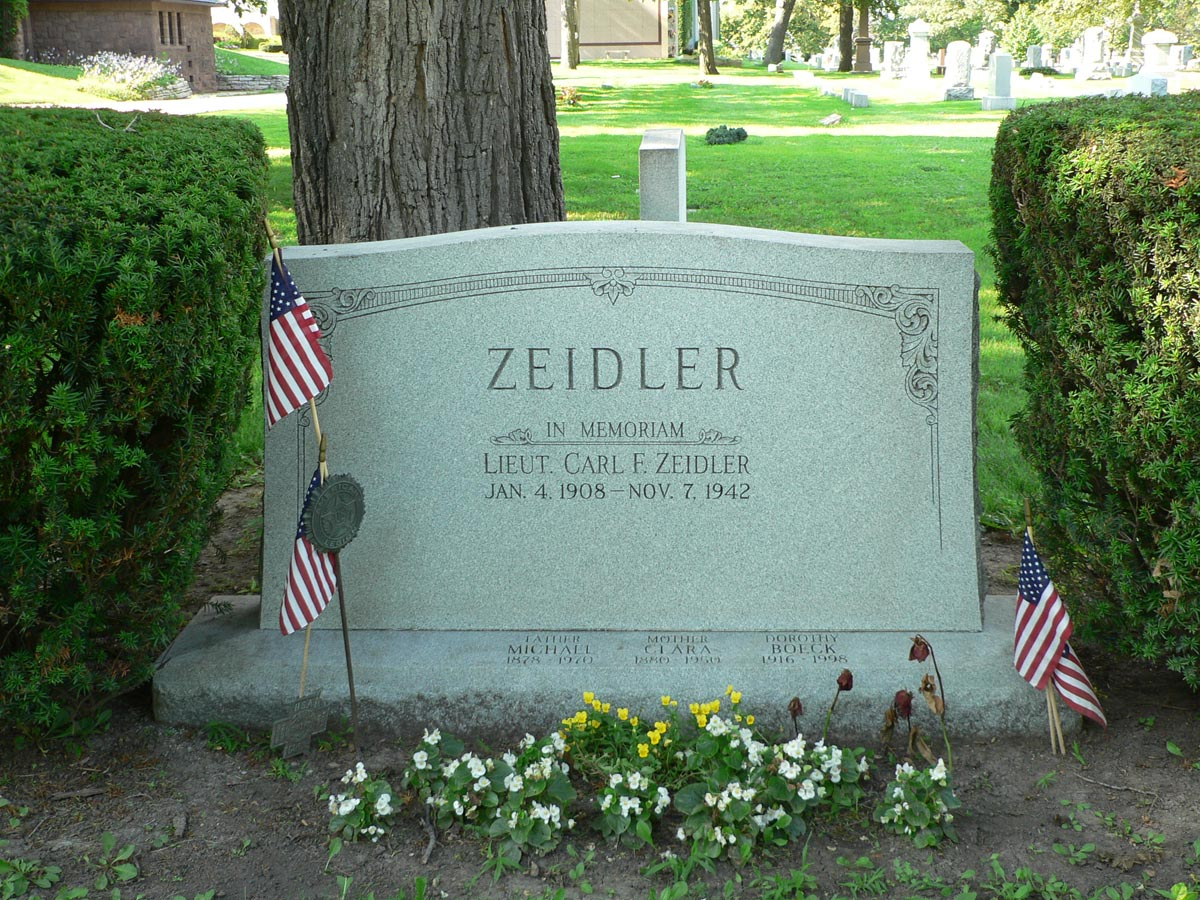
Carl Zeidler marker

Forest Home Cemetery is home to 28 Milwaukee mayors, seven Wisconsin governors, noted industrialists and over 110,000 burials. The Newhall House Monument is a mass grave for 64 people of the Newhall House fire of 1883, in which 71 individuals (43 unidentified) died.

- George A. Abert, member of the Wisconsin Senate and Wisconsin State Assembly
- George G. Abert, member of the Wisconsin State Assembly
- Mathilde Franziska Anneke, German writer and suffragist
- Gerhard A. Bading, mayor and U.S. Minister to Ecuador
- Sherburn M. Becker, known as the "boy mayor" of Milwaukee
- Meta Schlichting Berger, female socialist organizer and advocate for improved public schooling systems
- Victor L. Berger, newspaper editor, U.S. representative, and founding member of the Socialist Party of America
- Jacob Best, founder of what became the Pabst Brewing Company
- Valentin Blatz, founder of the Valentin Blatz Brewing Company
- Sherman Booth, newspaper editor and abolitionist
- Harry Lynde Bradley, industrialist, co-founder of the Allen-Bradley corporation
- Lynde Bradley, industrialist, co-founder of the Allen-Bradley corporation
- Jane Bradley Pettit, philanthropist
- James S. Brown, U.S. representative and first Attorney General of Wisconsin
- Thomas H. Brown, mayor of Milwaukee (1880–1882; 1888–1890)
- George Brumder, newspaper publisher (largest circulation of German language papers in the U.S.)
- Ammi R. Butler, mayor of Milwaukee (1876–1878)
- Matthew H. Carpenter, attorney and U.S. senator from Wisconsin (1869–1875; 1879–1881)
- Alfred L. Cary, lawyer, member of the Wisconsin State Assembly
- John W. Cary, lawyer, mayor of Racine, Wisconsin (1857–1858), member of the Wisconsin State Senate.
- Dickey Chapelle, photojournalist and war correspondent during World War II and the Vietnam War
- Enoch Chase, member of the Wisconsin Legislature
- Horace Chase, mayor of Milwaukee (1862–1863)
- James Tallmadge Conklin, first police chief of Fond du Lac, Wisconsin
- Hans Crocker, mayor of Milwaukee (1852), editor of Milwaukee's first newspaper, the Milwaukee Advertiser
- Lysander Cutler, politician and Union Army general during the American Civil War
- Arthur Davidson, co-founder of the motorcycle company Harley-Davidson
- William Davidson, co-founder of the motorcycle company Harley-Davidson
- Walter Davidson, co-founder of the motorcycle company Harley-Davidson
- James W. Dawes, governor of Nebraska (1883–1887)
- William Disch, member of the Wisconsin Legislature
- Barney Augustus Eaton, member of the Wisconsin Legislature
- Susan Stuart Frackelton, painter
- Oscar M. Fritz, chief justice of the Wisconsin Supreme Court (1950–1954)
- Ezekiel Gillespie, African American civil rights and voting activist
- Franklin L. Gilson, speaker of the Wisconsin State Assembly (1882–1883)
- Charles A. Gombert (1833-1920), architect who designed Milwaukee's North Point Water Tower
- William T. Green, attorney and African American civil rights activist
- Charles Hammersley, 1930 candidate for governor of Wisconsin
- Harrison Carroll Hobart, Union Army general, speaker of the Wisconsin Assembly (1849–1850), 1859 and 1865 gubernatorial candidate
- Edward D. Holton, businessman, 1853 and 1857 gubernatorial candidate
- Levi Hubbell, chief justice of the Wisconsin Supreme Court (1851–1852), first Wisconsin state official to be impeached
- James Graham Jenkins, Judge of the United States Court of Appeals for the Seventh Circuit
- Louise Phelps Kellogg, historian, writer, and educator
- Byron Kilbourn, American surveyor, railroad executive and co-founder of the City of Milwaukee
- Charles King, U.S. General and distinguished writer
- Abner Kirby, businessman and mayor of Milwaukee (1864–1865)
- Increase A. Lapham, author, scientist, and early American naturalist
- John "Babbacombe" Lee, famous for surviving three execution attempts.
- Nancy Oestreich Lurie, anthropologist
- William Pitt Lynde, mayor of Milwaukee (1860–1861) and U.S. representative
- Harrison Ludington, mayor of Milwaukee (1871–1872; 1873–1876) and governor of Wisconsin (1876–78)
- Alfred Lunt & Lynn Fontanne, husband and wife, award-winning Broadway actors
- Stoddard Martin, Wisconsin state legislator, builder of the first brewery in Milwaukee (1841).
- Francis McGovern, governor of Wisconsin (1911–1915)
- Kate Hamilton Pier McIntosh, one of the first women to become a lawyer in Wisconsin
- Edmund T. Melms, American politician
- Andrew G. Miller, justice of the territorial Wisconsin Supreme Court (1838–1848) and U.S. district judge (1848–1873).
- Alexander Mitchell, banker
- Billy Mitchell, U.S. Army general regarded as the father of the U.S. Air Force
- John Mitchell, U.S. representative, U.S. senator from Wisconsin (1893–99), and father of Gen. Billy Mitchell
- William A.O. Munsell, Los Angeles architect
- Frederick Pabst, businessman, founder of the Pabst Brewing Company
- Henry Clay Payne, U.S. Postmaster General (1902–04)
- George Peck, newspaper publisher, mayor of Milwaukee and governor of Wisconsin (1891–95)
- Ole Petersen, founder of Methodism in Norway
- Emanuel L. Philipp, governor of Wisconsin (1915–1921)
- Charles Quentin, Wisconsin state senator (1861–1862)
- Mabel Watson Raimey, lawyer, first African American woman admitted to the Wisconsin bar
- John Rugee, Wisconsin politician
- Jacob Rummel, Wisconsin state senator (1905–1909)
- Joseph Schlitz (cenotaph), businessman, founder of the Joseph Schlitz Brewing Company
- C. Latham Sholes, inventor of the first practical typewriter with its QWERTY key layout, pioneer of Kenosha, Wisconsin
- William E. Smith, governor of Wisconsin (1878–1882), and co-founder of Roundy's supermarket chain
- Fred W. Springer, Wisconsin politician
- Isaac Stephenson, U.S. senator from Wisconsin (1907–1915)
- John M. Stowell, Mayor of Milwaukee
- John J. Tallmadge (1818–1873), 17th mayor of Milwaukee
- Adonis Terry, 19th century Major League Baseball player
- Harvey G. Turner, Wisconsin politician and lawyer
- August Uihlein (1842–1911), businessman, Joseph Schlitz Brewing Company
- Robert Uihlein Jr. (1916–1976), president of the Joseph Schlitz Brewing Co., noted polo player,
- Don Upham, United States Attorney and two-term Milwaukee mayor
- Edward Voigt, U.S. representative
- George Walker, early settler and co-founder of the City of Milwaukee
- Isaac Walker, U.S. senator from Wisconsin (1848–55) and younger brother of George Walker
- Emil Wallber, mayor of Milwaukee (1884–88)
- Daniel Wells Jr., U.S. representative
- Oscar Werwath, founder of the Milwaukee School of Engineering
- Frederick C. Winkler, Union Army general
- Carl Zeidler (cenotaph), brother to Frank Zeidler and Milwaukee's "singing mayor"
- Frank Zeidler, mayor of Milwaukee (1948–60) and 1976 United States Presidential Candidate for the Socialist Party USA

== See also ==
- List of Milwaukeeans
- List of mayors of Milwaukee
- Lincoln Village, City of Milwaukee, Wisconsin
