= Hans Crocker =

American journalist (1815–1889)

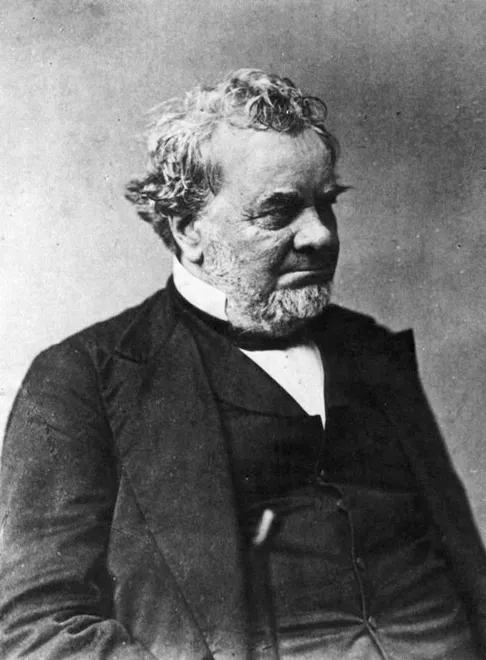
- Crocker c. 1852

6th Mayor of Milwaukee
- In office 1852–1852
- Preceded by: George H. Walker
- Succeeded by: George H. Walker

Personal details
- Born: June 11, 1815 Dublin, Ireland
- Died: March 16, 1889 (aged 73)
- Party: Democratic Party of Wisconsin; Republican Party of Wisconsin
- Spouse: Augusta Potter (m. 1844)

Hans Crocker (June 11, 1815 – March 16, 1889) was an American lawyer and Wisconsin politician.

He began his career as a member of the Democratic Party of Wisconsin, but later became a member of the Republican Party of Wisconsin.

Crocker was born in Dublin, Ireland in 1815, and emigrated to the United States with his family. He was raised in Utica, New York. After high school, he moved to Chicago, Illinois, where he studied law privately.

Crocker is closely associated with Byron Kilbourn and his projects to develop Milwaukee and Wisconsin over the years. Crocker first moved to Milwaukee in 1836 and became the first editor of the Milwaukee's first newspaper, the Milwaukee Advertiser.

The Advertiser served as Kilbourn's trumpet to promote settlement in Kilbourntown, the area on the west side of the Milwaukee River where he owned large tracts of land, over settlement in the neighboring Juneautown. In fact, Crocker bought tracts of land in the Kilbourntown area himself. He stayed on as editor for a few months before entering into a private law practice in the area. He would continue to practice law privately until 1844.

Crocker was actively involved in the political and legal fields in Wisconsin. Crocker served as private secretary to Henry Dodge, the first governor of the Wisconsin Territory, in 1836. In 1838 he was Judge Advocate General of the Wisconsin Territorial Guard.

From 1842 to 1844, he served two terms in the Wisconsin Territorial Council, equivalent to the State Senate. In 1853, he served one term as mayor of Milwaukee. He was a Wisconsin delegate to the 1860 Republican National Convention which selected Abraham Lincoln as its candidate for the presidency.

Crocker also was involved in the development of public improvements in the area, especially those devised by Kilbourn. Crocker was canal commissioner in 1839, president of the Milwaukee Board of Trade in 1850, director of the Milwaukee and Watertown Plank Road and president of the Lake Hydraulic Company in 1852, director of Kilbourn's Milwaukee and Mississippi Railroad and president of the Milwaukee Gas and Light Company in 1853, commissioner reporting on the Fox River Valley Railroad in 1856, receiver for the Portage and La Crosse Division of the Milwaukee and Mississippi Railroad in 1857, and vice-president of the Milwaukee and Prairie du Chien Railroad in 1858.

In 1856, a private ship named the Hans Crocker was commissioned in Milwaukee. It eventually would be stranded near Kenosha, Wisconsin in 1876.

Crocker married Augusta Potter on March 21, 1844. He died at age 73 and is buried in Milwaukee's Forest Home Cemetery.

Political offices
Preceded by George H. Walker	Mayor of Milwaukee; 1852	Succeeded by George H. Walker
