= Valentin Blatz =

German-American brewer and banker

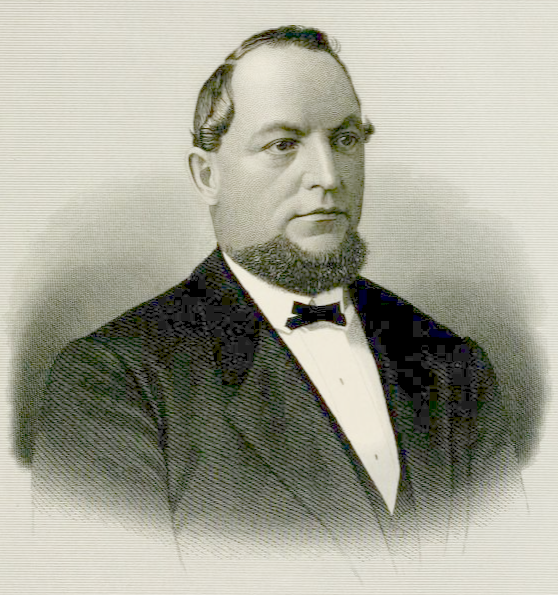
- 1877 portrait
- Born: October 1, 1826; Miltenberg, Bavaria
- Died: May 26, 1894 (aged 67); St. Paul, Minnesota
- Occupation: Brewer
- Known for: Blatz beer

Valentin Blatz (October 1, 1826 – May 26, 1894) was a German-American brewer and banker.

== Biography ==
Valentin Blatz was born in Miltenberg, Kingdom of Bavaria, and worked at his father's brewery in his youth. In August 1848, he immigrated to America, and by 1849 had moved to Milwaukee, Wisconsin.

Blatz established a brewery next to Johann Braun's City Brewery in 1850 and merged both breweries upon Braun's death in 1852. He also married Braun's widow.

The brewery produced Milwaukee's first individually bottled beer in 1874. It incorporated as the Valentin Blatz Brewing Company in 1889 and by the 1900s was the city's third largest brewer.

He was active in many organizations such as the Independent Order of Odd Fellows. Blatz was a freemason and member of Aurora Lodge No.30 in Milwaukee, Wisconsin.

Blatz died in St. Paul, Minnesota on May 26, 1894, while returning home to Milwaukee from a trip to California. He was survived by a wife, three sons, and two daughters. He is buried in a massive family mausoleum at Forest Home Cemetery in Milwaukee.

== Gallery ==
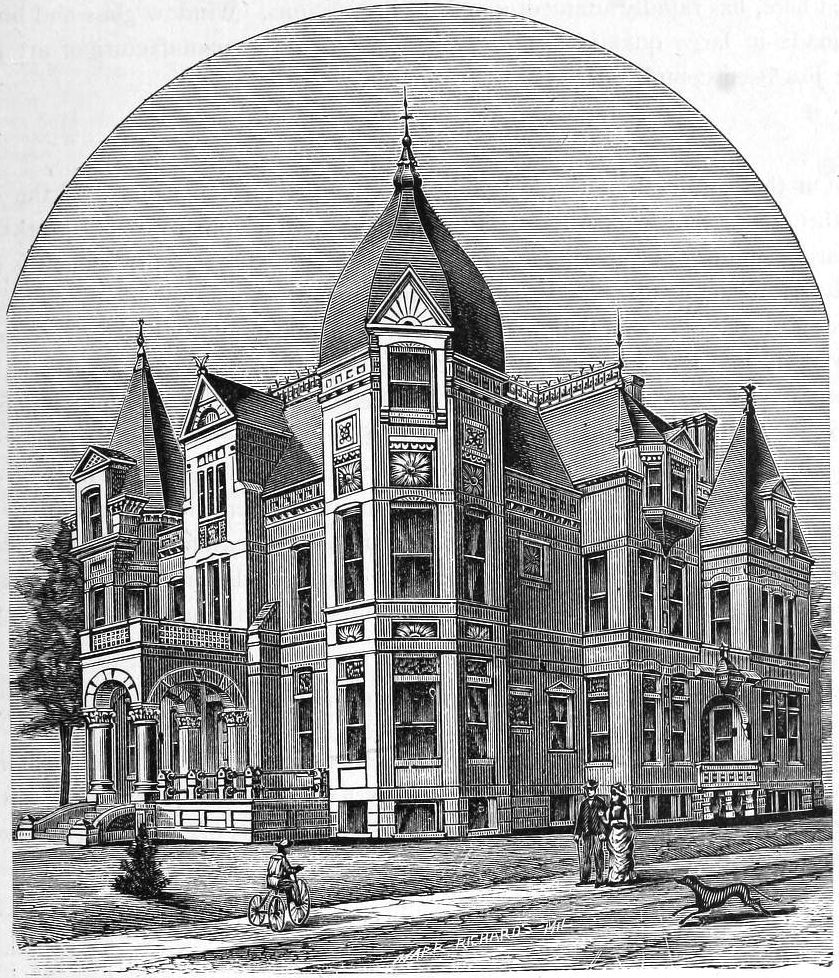
Valentin Blatz home (1886 engraving)

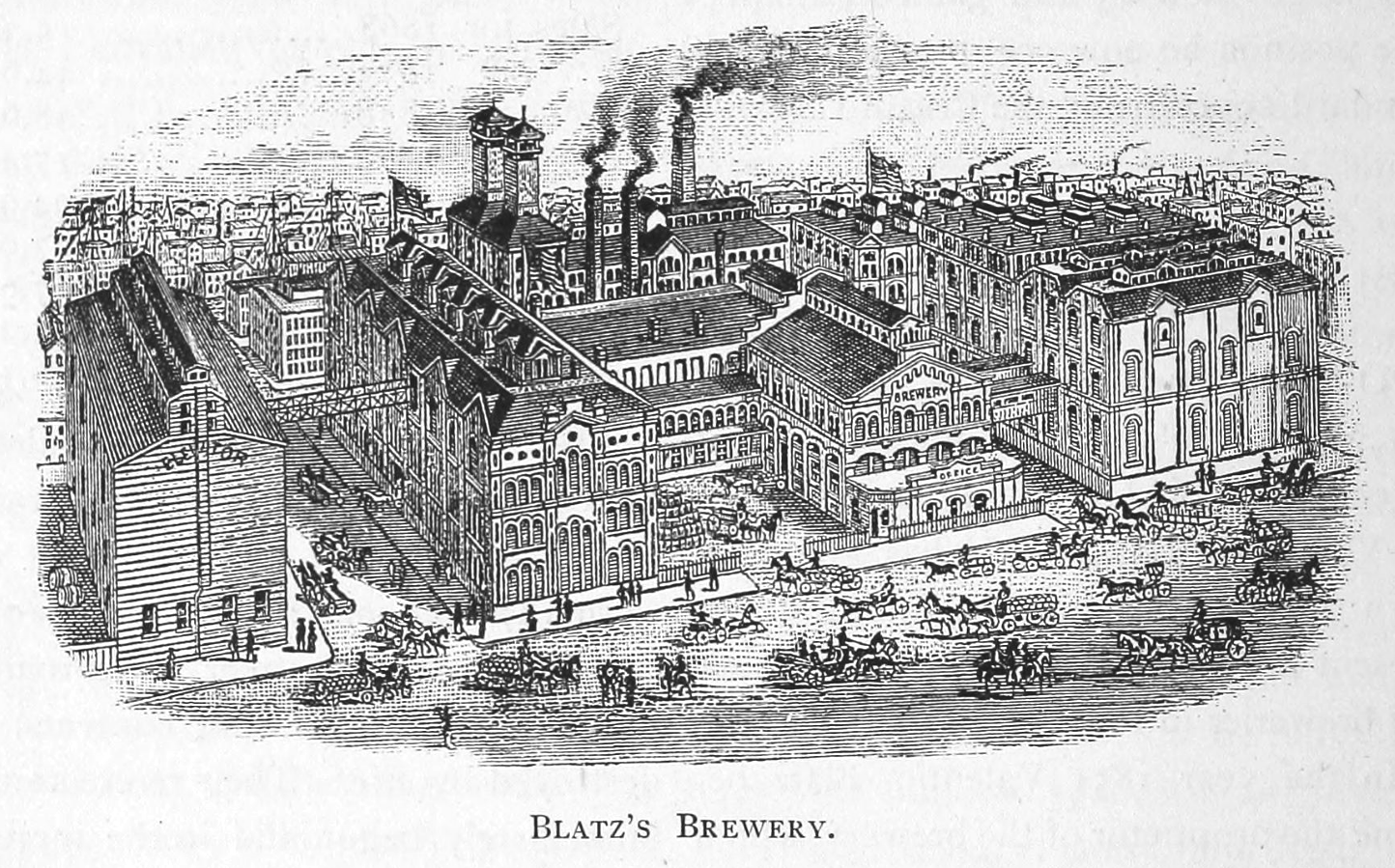
Blatz brewery (1886 engraving)

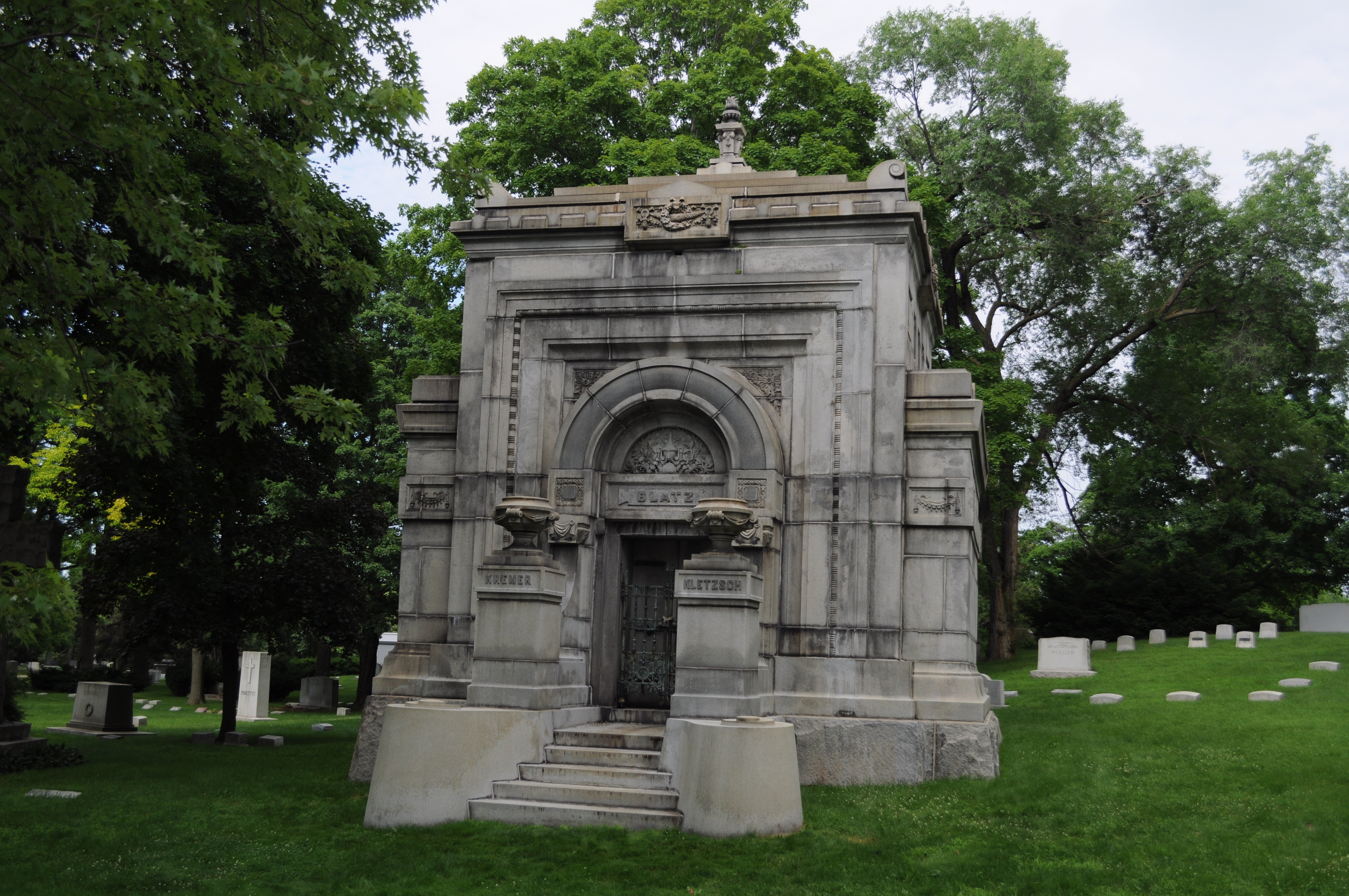
Mausoleum in Forest Home Cemetery

== See also ==
- Eberhard Anheuser
- Jacob Best
- Adolphus Busch
- Adolph Coors
- Gottlieb Heileman
- Frederick Miller
- Frederick Pabst
- Joseph Schlitz
- August Uihlein
