= Saint Vincent's Infant Asylum =

- U.S. National Register of Historic Places
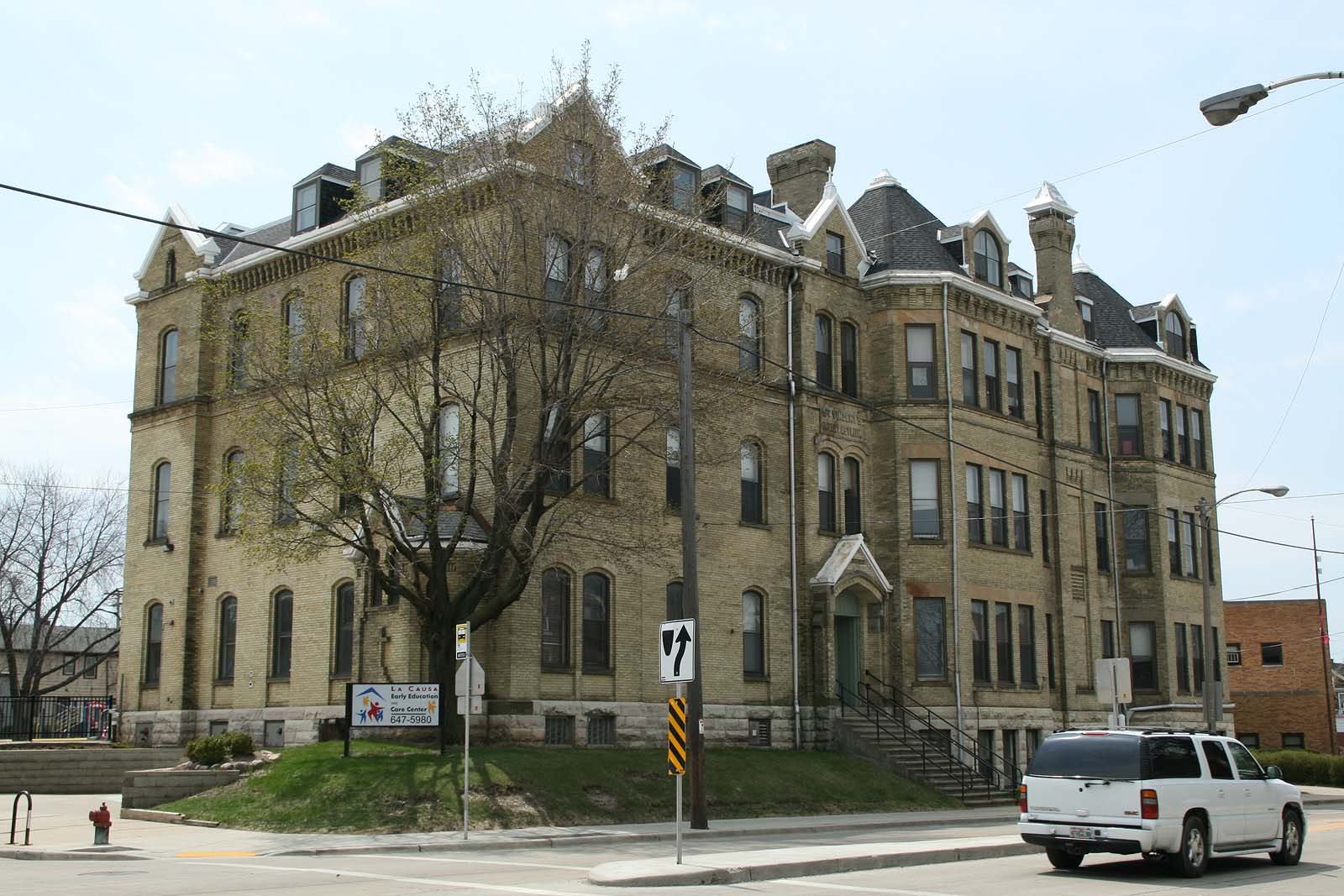
- Saint Vincent's Infant Asylum
- Location: 809 W. Greenfield Ave., Milwaukee, Wisconsin
- Coordinates: 43°01′01″N 87°55′16″W
- Area: less than one acre
- Built: 1878, expanded 1890 + 1900
- Architect: Charles A. Gombert, E. Townsend Mix, Charles Crane
- Architectural style: Late Gothic Revival
- NRHP reference No.: 87001742
- Added to NRHP: September 25, 1987

Saint Vincent's Infant Asylum was built as a Catholic institution for unwanted infants in Milwaukee, Wisconsin. The first section of the building was constructed in 1878 in High Victorian Gothic style, with similar additions following. Ever since, the building has housed various social service programs. In 1987 it was listed on the National Register of Historic Places.

== History ==
The Daughters of Charity of Saint Vincent de Paul order came to Milwaukee in 1846, aiming to care for needy infants and unwed mothers, and to provide health care for the destitute. They established St. John's Infirmary (the predecessor of St. Mary's Hospital) and St. Rose's Orphanage for Girls, both on the east side.

In 1877 the Sisters opened the initial St. Vincent's Asylum, with three nuns caring for nine infants in a rented house on the corner of South Fifth and West Virginia Streets.

That winter the land on Greenfield Avenue where the asylum now stands was bought, and Charles Gombert began to design the first section of the building. The cornerstone was laid in the summer of 1878, with speeches in both English and German. Gombert's initial section is the current east half. It is 3.5 stories, with brick walls sitting on a rusticated limestone foundation, with a mansard roof interrupted by gables and dormers. Above the main entrance, "St. Vincent's Infant Asylum" is carved into a block of limestone. Projecting from one corner is an apse with a cross in the brickwork and small windows. This corresponds to where the chapel is inside. In this first stage, the building housed about 35 infants each year.

In 1890 the building was expanded, doubling its capacity. Gombert's original design included plans for an addition to the west, but instead the Sisters hired E. Townsend Mix to redesign the addition. Mix followed Gombert's lead and designed a similar, compatible addition with limestone foundation and similar brick, but he added deeper bays with chamfered corners, brick corbels to support the cornice, and a more prominent chimney and dormers. Mix's design shows the flashier Gothic that was in style in 1890, as compared to Gombert's more austere Gothic section from 1878, and it may reflect the wealth of donors.

In 1900 another wing was added behind Mix's, again increasing the capacity of the asylum. It was designed by Charles Crane in a simpler style.

St. Vincent's was operated by the Daughters of Charity of Saint Vincent de Paul and the Roman Catholic Archdiocese of Milwaukee. Initially the Asylum cared primarily for children up to age six; these included orphans as well as children of unmarried or widowed mothers. With Milwaukee's large immigrant population, many unfortunate children had little or no family nearby to care for them. Some children were left on the asylum's doorstep. Others were left there temporarily by parents hoping to have the means to take them back some day. The asylum also cared for some unwed mothers.

If the parents were gone, St. Vincent's would try to place children with adoptive families or in boarding places. If they were still at St. Vincent's at age six, girls would be transferred to St. Rose's Orphanage and boys to St. Emilian's.

Starting in 1932, the Catholic Social Welfare Bureau controlled admission to St. Vincent's, as well as placement of older children leaving the asylum.

By 1945 St. Vincent's had admitted 7,315 children and 2,782 mothers, and had a staff of nine sisters.

St. Vincent's was closed in 1958, a result of changes at the State Welfare Department. The St. Vincent DePaul Society treated alcoholic men in the building from 1959 to 1968. After that it was used by United Migrant Opportunity Services. More recently, the building has been used as a daycare and early education center.
