= Henderson Castle (Kalamazoo) =

- 100 Monroe Street, Kalamazoo, Michigan
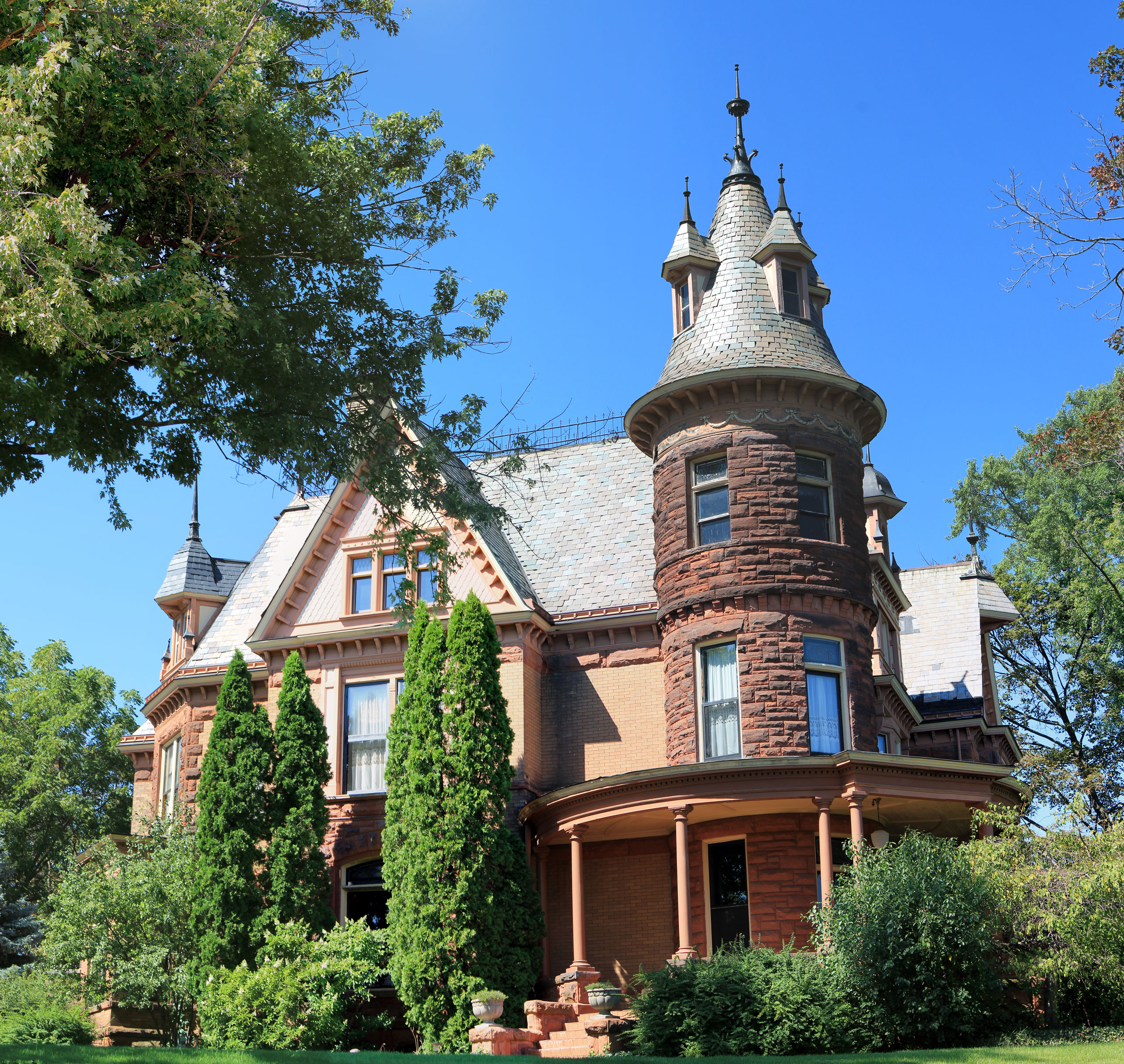
- Henderson Castle in August 2011

Site information
- Type: Queen Anne style
- Owner: Private home
- Open to the public: Yes
- Condition: Renovated
- Website: www.hendersoncastle.org

Location
- Coordinates: 42°17.572′N 85°36.300′W

Site history
- Built: 1895
- Built by: C. A. Gombert
- Materials: Sandstone & brick

Henderson Castle, built in 1895, is a large privately owned home located on the steep West Main Hill overlooking downtown Kalamazoo, Michigan. The castle has been recently renovated and is under new ownership. The building is open to the public.

== Architecture ==
The Queen Anne style house was designed by C. A. Gombert of Milwaukee, Wisconsin. The $72,000 building costs included seven baths (one with a thirteen-head shower), an elevator, a third-floor ballroom, and a hot tub on the roof (added later). The castle's exterior was constructed of Lake Superior sandstone and brick, and the interior wood included mahogany, bird's eye maple, quartered oak, birch, and American sycamore. The castle was built with 25 rooms in all and exemplified the most expensive tastes of the time.

== History ==
The history of the home began with Frank Henderson, one of early Kalamazoo's most successful businessmen. He was the owner and president of Henderson-Ames Company, which made uniform regalia for secret societies, fraternal organizations, and the military. Henderson's wife, Mary, had inherited a plot of undeveloped land on the western edge of Kalamazoo before the company's large success. Mr. Henderson dreamt of a grand suburb on this land. Allowing that dream to come to fruition, in 1888, he enlisted the help of surveyors, engineers, and landscape architects to plot the land and create Kalamazoo's first "natural site plan". In 1890, Mr. Henderson was ready to build his home in his new residential district.

The Hendersons held a housewarming party in 1895. Mr. Henderson died in 1899, but his wife remained at the castle until she died in 1907. The castle was inherited by the Henderson children. However, in 1919 it was sold out of the family to Bertrand Hopper, President and Treasurer of Kalamazoo Stationery Company. Ten parties have owned Henderson Castle.

In the 1920s, Hopper converted the brick stable on the property to a four car garage. It has since been transformed into a separate residence. After being vacant for several years, William Stuifbergen purchased the house in 1945, and divided it into several apartments. He and his family resided in one of the units.

In 1957, the house was deeded to the First National Bank, as trustee. The castle was considered for the Art Institute, but became the property of the renowned liberal arts school, Kalamazoo College, where the campus lies just a block to the south of the castle's grounds.

In 1975, Dr. Jess Walker bought the house and began a restoration process that continued under Frederick Royce, who purchased the property in 1981. He then was a guest star on House Hunters International, and sold the castle and moved to Buenos Aires, Argentina in 2005.

Laura and Peter Livingstone-McNelis obtained the home in 2005, and maintained it as open to the public (running the bed and breakfast Royce had started). It was purchased in 2010 by Robert Jackson and sold to Francois Moyet, a Master French chef, who has continued the operation of the bed and breakfast since he purchased it in 2011. He has also started a fine French dining restaurant inside the home, as well as a spa, named "Mary Henderson's Spa".

Also of interest, the castle was the setting for a science fiction movie filmed in Kalamazoo. The movie, “Housesitter: The Night They Saved Siegfried's Brain”, was completed in 1988 but not completed (post-production) or released until 2018.
