= Baasen House-German YMCA =

- U.S. National Register of Historic Places
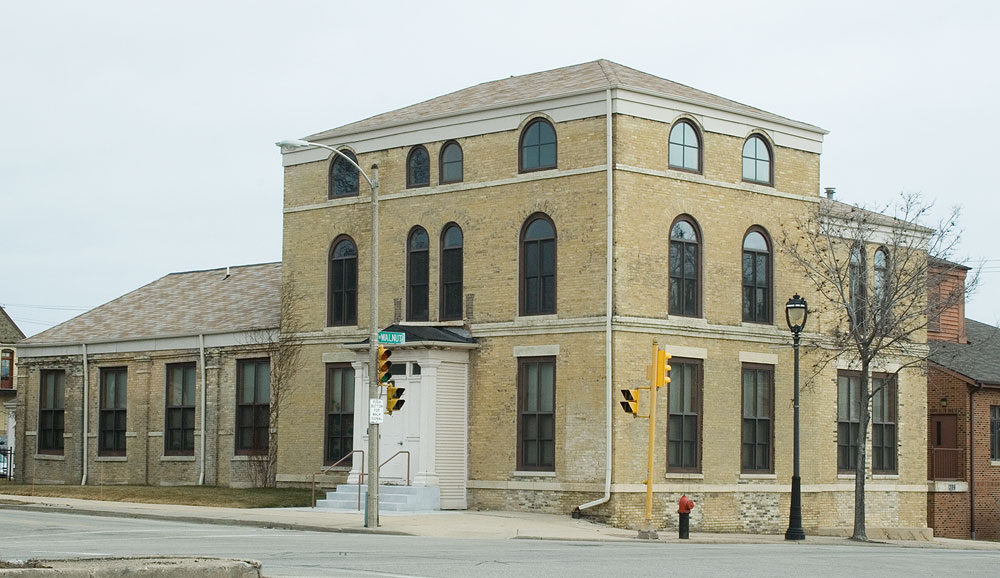
- Baasen House-German YMCA
- Location: 1702 N. 4th St. Milwaukee, Wisconsin
- Coordinates: 43.05278°N 87.91551°W
- Built: 1874
- Architect: C. A. Gombert
- Architectural style: Italian Villa
- NRHP reference No.: 84003718
- Added to NRHP: August 2, 1984

The Baasen House-German YMCA in Milwaukee, Wisconsin dates from 1874. It was added to the National Register of Historic Places in 1984.

It is a three-story brick building with a one-story brick-veneered 44 by 48 feet (13 m × 15 m) gable-roofed extension. The original house was built in 1874 for John F. Baasen, a leading citizen and a director of the Milwaukee-Horicon Railroad and of the Berlin and Lake Superior Railroad. It was designed in Italian Villa style by architect Charles A. Gombert and was one of few brick houses in the Brewers' Hill neighborhood.

The house was home of the German Branch of the YMCA during 1888 to 1893; the extension, housing a gymnasium, was added in 1889.
