= Charles A. Gombert =

Milwaukee architect (1833-1920)

Charles A. Gombert (1833–November 12, 1920), often referred to as C. A. Gombert, was an architect active in Wisconsin. Born in Germany, he came to the United States in 1866. He established his architectural practice in Milwaukee in 1873.

Schematic of the North Point Water Tower

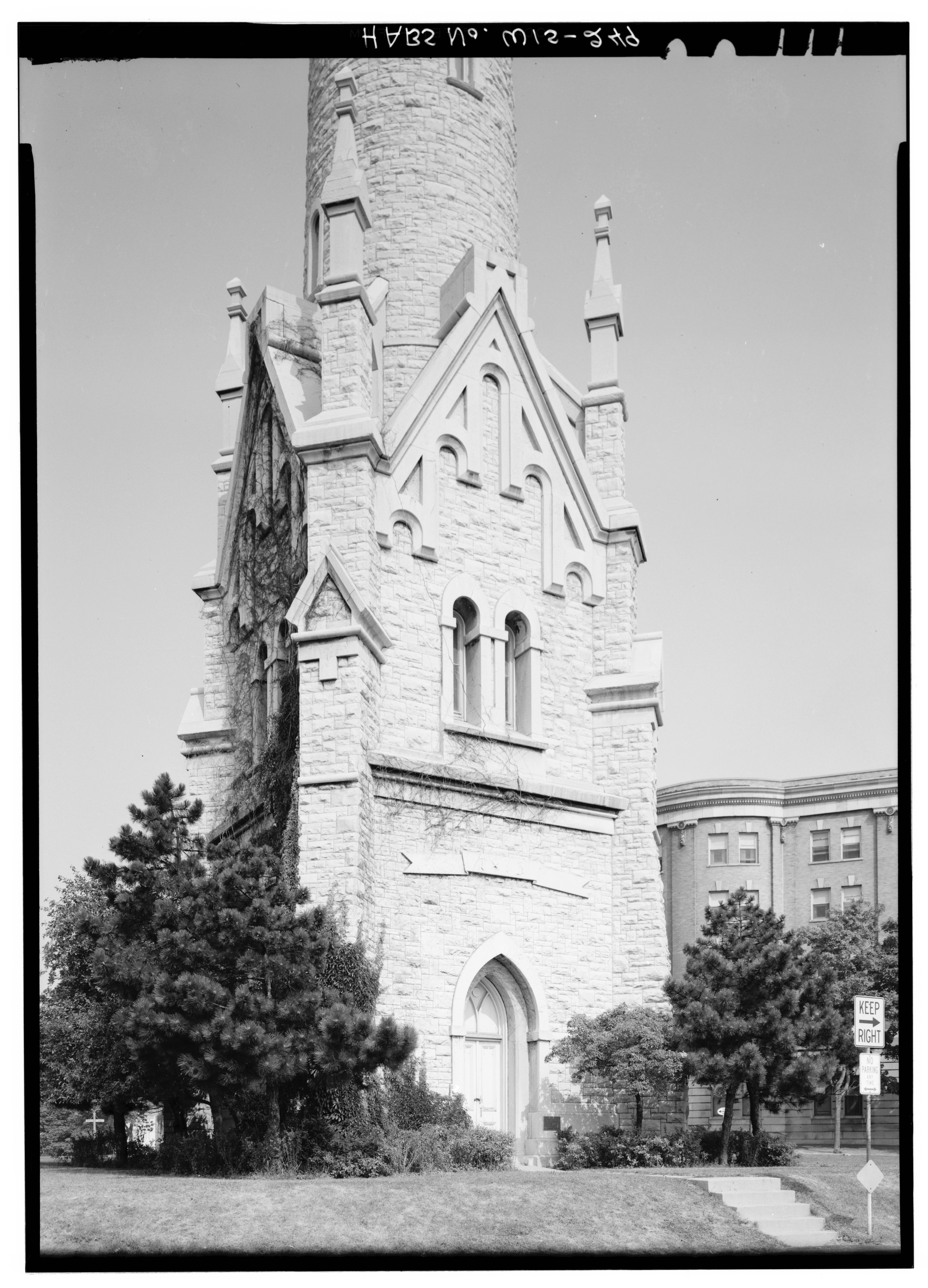
HABS photo of the North Point Water Tower

Gombert designed the Victorian Gothic-style North Point Water Tower in Milwaukee. It was described by the Milwaukee Journal as a city landmark, one of the finest examples of Norman-style architecture, and a monument to Gombert. A 1928 edition of The Wisconsin Magazine of History named him as one of 12 registered architects in the city.

== Death ==
Gombert died at his home in Neenah, Wisconsin, on 12 November 1920, at age 87. Survived by his wife and son, he was buried at Forest Home Cemetery.

== Work ==
- North Point Water Tower (1873–74) at E. North Avenue & N. Lake Drive in Milwaukee, NRHP-listed
- Baasen House-German YMCA (1874) at 1702 N. 4th Street in Milwaukee, NRHP-listed
- Henry Manschot house (1874) at 718 E. Wells Street, a 2-story Italianate-styled house with a hip roof and brick walls with corner quoins in Milwaukee's Cass-Wells Street Historic District
- Saint Vincent's Infant Asylum (1878) at 809 W. Greenfield Avenue in Milwaukee, NRHP-listed
- Henry and Mary Schuttler house (1880) at 371 East Lisbon Road in Oconomowoc, Wisconsin

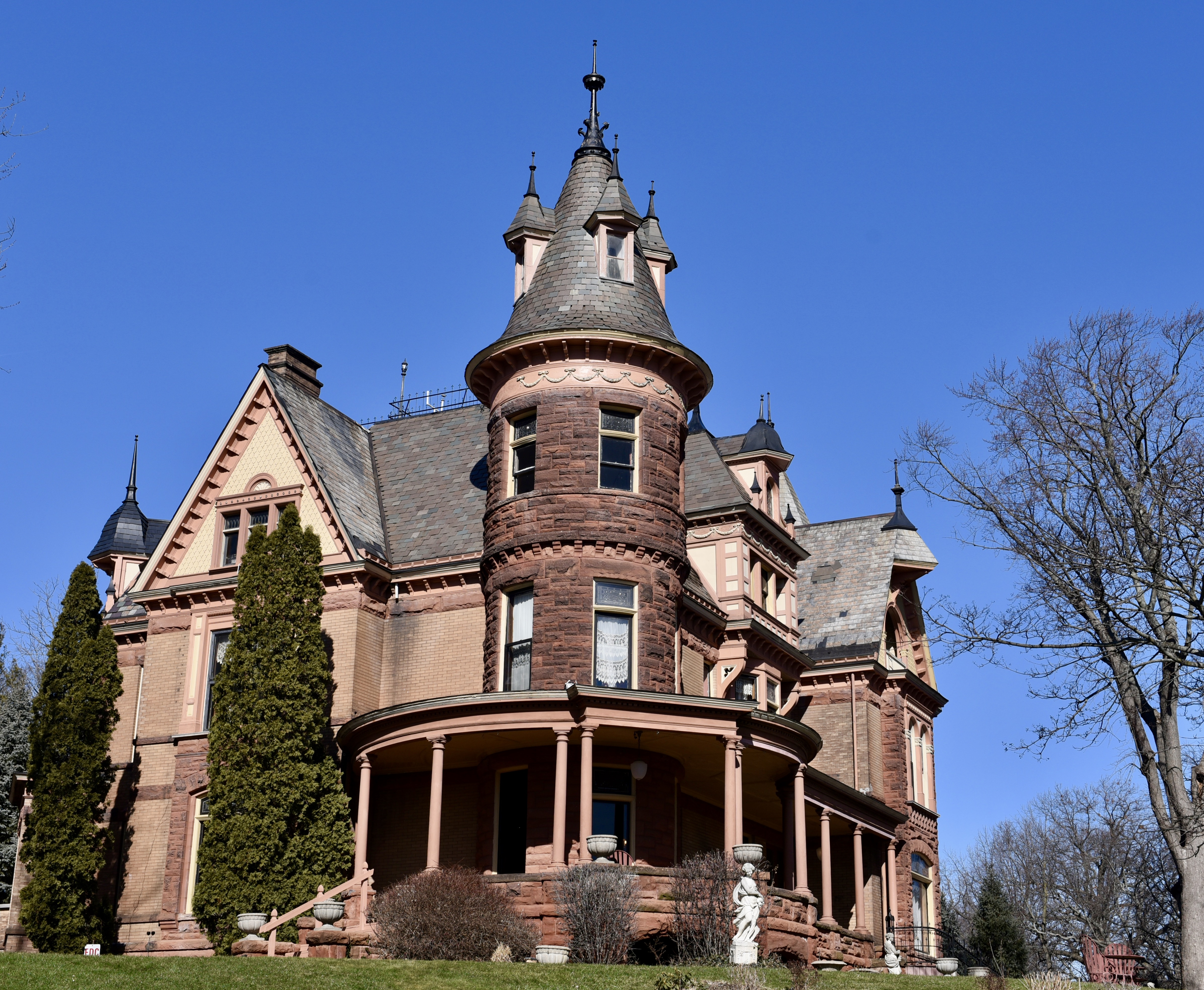
Henderson Castle in Kalamazoo

- Victor Schlitz house (1890) at 2004 North Highland Avenue in Milwaukee
- Henderson Castle / Frank and Mary Henderson House (1895) at 100 Monroe Street in Kalamazoo, Michigan

== See also ==
- National Register of Historic Places listings in Waukesha County, Wisconsin
