= William A. Hawkins (politician) =

American politician (1812–1888)

2nd Mayor of Salida, Colorado
- In office 1881–1883
- Preceded by: Benjamin Haight DeRemer
- Succeeded by: Samuel B. Westerfield

Member of the Wisconsin State Assembly
- In office January 7, 1856 – January 5, 1857
- Preceded by: Edward O'Neill
- Succeeded by: Andrew McCormick
- Constituency: Milwaukee 3rd district
- In office January 3, 1853 – January 2, 1854
- Preceded by: Valentin Knœll
- Succeeded by: William E. Webster
- Constituency: Milwaukee 5th district

Personal details
- Born: April 7, 1812 New York, U.S.
- Died: March 19, 1888 (aged 75) Salida, Colorado, U.S.
- Resting place: Cleora Cemetery, Salida, Colorado
- Party: Republican; Whig (before 1854)
- Spouses: Jane Catharine Parks (m. 1837; died 1850); Desiah Parks (m. 1851–1888)
- Children: with Jane Parks; Adelaide Frances Hawkins^{(b. 1848; died 1850)}; Jennie (Ryan)^{(b. 1850; died after 1930)}; with Desiah Parks; William F. Hawkins^{(b. 1852; died 1852)}; Passins A. Hawkins^{(b. 1854; died 1854)}; Charles A. Hawkins^{(b. 1855; died 1925)}; Matilda Louise Hawkins^{(b. 1857; died 1880)}; James Williams Hawkins^{(b. 1859; died 1878)}
- Occupation: Hotelier, politician

William A. Hawkins (April 7, 1812 – March 19, 1888) was an American hotelier, politician, and pioneer of Wisconsin and Colorado. He served two terms in the Wisconsin State Assembly, representing the south side of the city of Milwaukee during the 1853 and 1856 terms. During his latter term, he was implicated in the massive railroad bribery scheme that tainted most of the legislators in that term. Soon after, he left Wisconsin and settled in Chaffee County, Colorado, where he served as a police magistrate and the second mayor of Salida, Colorado.

Wisconsin State Assembly
Preceded by Valentin Knœll	Member of the Wisconsin State Assembly from the Milwaukee 5th district January 3, 1853 – January 2, 1854	Succeeded by William E. Webster
Preceded by Edward O'Neill	Member of the Wisconsin State Assembly from the Milwaukee 3rd district January 7, 1856 – January 5, 1857	Succeeded by Andrew McCormick
