= North Point Water Tower =

- U.S. National Register of Historic Places
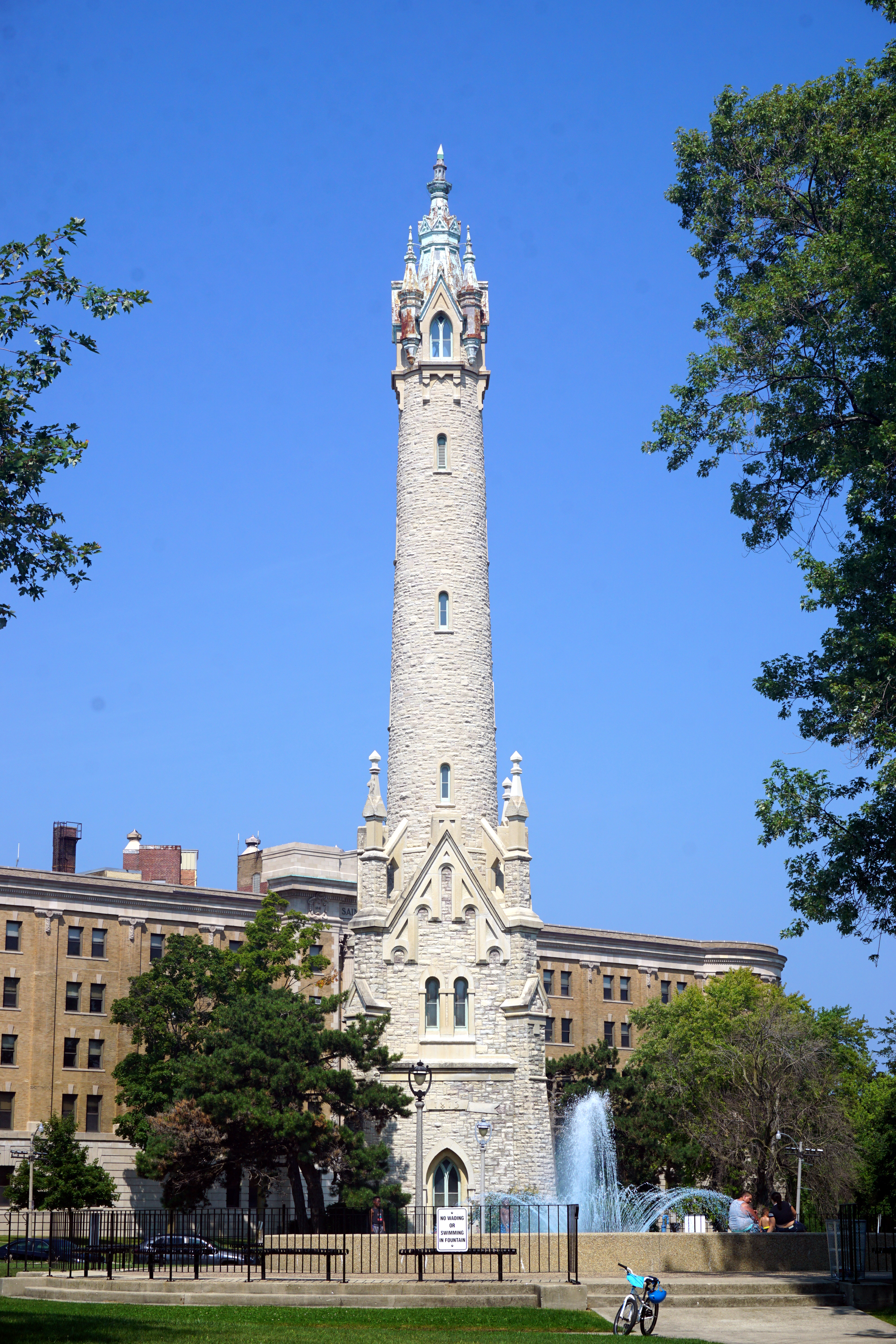
- North Point Water Tower
- Location: E. North Avenue & N. Lake Drive; Milwaukee, Wisconsin
- Coordinates: 43.05971°N 87.87987°W
- Architect: Charles A. Gombert
- Architectural style: Victorian Gothic
- NRHP reference No.: 73000088
- Added to NRHP: February 23, 1973

The North Point Water Tower was built in 1873 and 1874 as part of Milwaukee, Wisconsin's first public waterworks, with Victorian Gothic styling for the exterior. It was added to the National Register of Historic Places in 1973.

== History ==
The City of Milwaukee was authorized by the Wisconsin Legislature to construct the water tower in 1871. Designed by Charles A. Gombert, it was built out of limestone from Wauwatosa, Wisconsin to house the wrought iron standpipe. It was first put in service on September 14, 1874. By the mid-20th century, improvements in pumping technology made the standpipe unnecessary. The North Point Water Tower ceased operation in 1963 following the completion of the Howard Avenue Water Purification Plant, when electric pumps replaced the older steam-powered equipment that had previously required the tower’s standpipe system. In 1968, the Milwaukee Landmark Commission designated the tower as an official landmark and on February 23, 1973, it was added to the National Register of Historic Places.

According to Urban Milwaukee, the building was estimated to cost $8,000 upon completion but instead amounted to $50,891.82.

North Point Pumping Station below the bluff drew water from Lake Michigan and pumped it onward into the municipal waterworks. The pipe inside the tower—four feet across and 120 feet tall—served to buffer the rest of the waterworks from destructive pulsations from the massive pumps. The standpipe was surrounded by the stone tower to keep its water from freezing.
