= James Kneeland =

American politician

James Kneeland (February 1816, LeRoy, New York – 6 September 1899, Milwaukee, Wisconsin) was a businessman and politician.

== Business career ==
In 1841, Kneeland moved to the Wisconsin Territory, settling in Milwaukee. Kneeland was credited with helping to found the Milwaukee Gas Light Company. He was also a promoter of numerous road and railroad companies, including Milwaukee and Mississippi Railroad.

== Political career ==
Kneeland was a member of the Wisconsin Territorial Council from 1845 to 1846. From 1867 to 1868, he was Tax Commissioner of Milwaukee. He was a Democrat.
