= Milwaukee Advertiser =

- Type: Weekly newspaper
- Founded: 1836
- Ceased publication: 1841

The Milwaukee Advertiser was the first newspaper published in Milwaukee, Wisconsin, and the third newspaper to be published in the state.

== History ==
The Milwaukee Advertiser began publication in Milwaukee, Wisconsin, in 1836 as a vehicle to discuss land development. It was the third newspaper in the state and the first outside of Green Bay. Coverage of projects such as the Rock River Canal led to the paper becoming involved in politics and Byron Kilbourn, a promoter of Milwaukee. Kilbourn feuded with Solomon Juneau, who founded the Milwaukee Sentinel in 1837 to compete with the Advertiser.

The Milwaukee Advertiser became the Milwaukee Courier in 1841.
