= John E. Cameron =

American politician

John E. Cameron (died 1852) was an American pioneer and politician.

Cameron was elected as the Milwaukee County register of deeds on September 6, 1847 and was elected to the Wisconsin State Assembly in 1850. Cameron made his living running the American House (later Plankinton House) livery stables in Milwaukee, Wisconsin from 1845 until his death.

He died of cholera in 1852.

== Notes ==
This article incorporates text from the 1909 edition of Memoirs of Milwaukee County, by Jerome Anthony Watrous which is in the public domain in the United States.
