= Newhall House hotel fire =

Fire in Wisconsin, United States

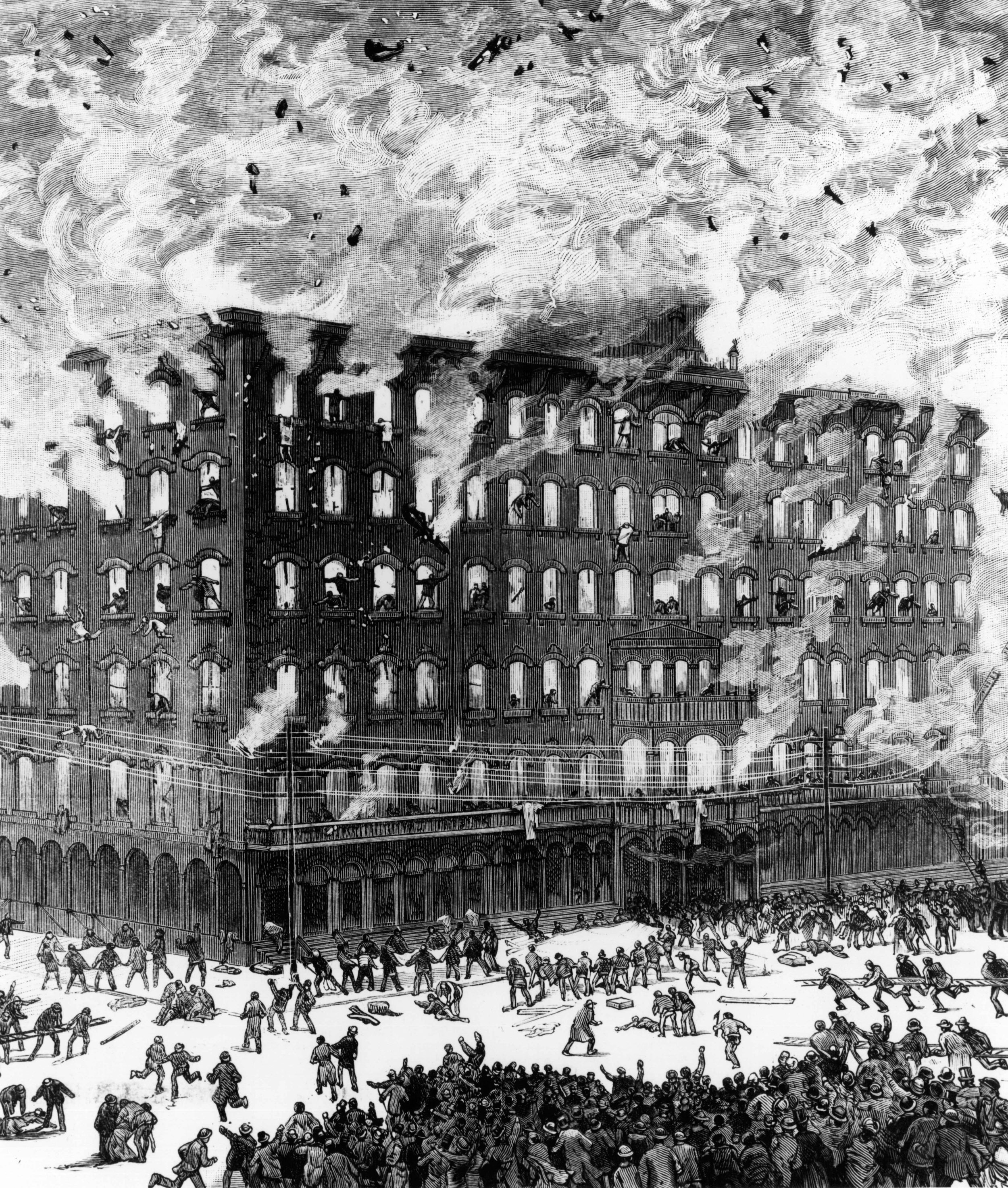
- The Newhall House Hotel on fire
- Date: January 10, 1883
- Location: Milwaukee, Wisconsin, U.S.; 43.0372°N 87.9081°W
- Deaths: 70+ dead

The Newhall House Hotel Fire (January 10, 1883) is the deadliest fire ever to have affected the city of Milwaukee, Wisconsin. At least 70 people perished in the fire. Survivors of the fire included General Tom Thumb and his wife Lavinia Warren, who were carried out of the building under the arm of a Milwaukee firefighter. Other survivors were William Edward Cramer, founder of The Evening Wisconsin, and his wife, Harriet.

== Monument ==
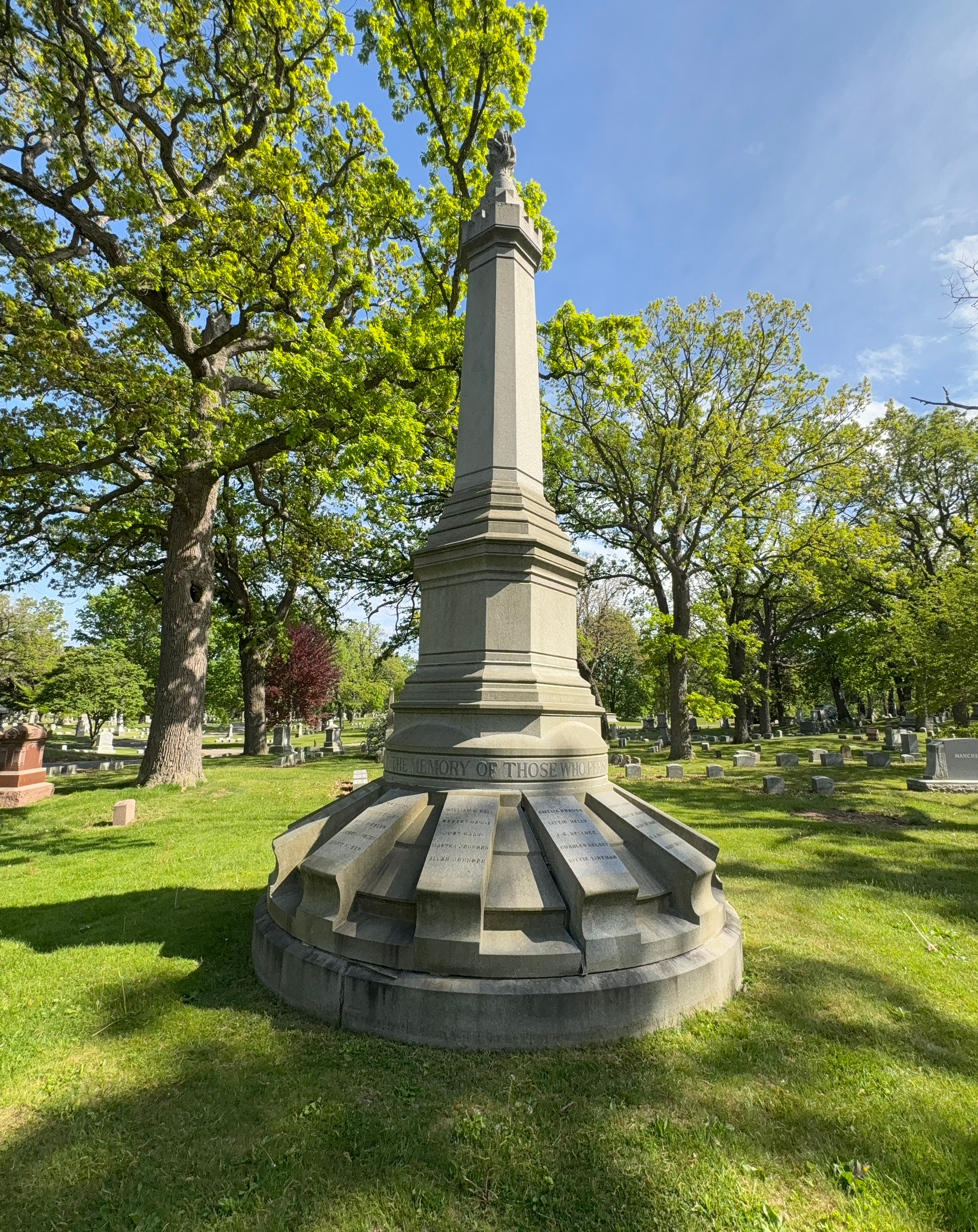

A monument to the fire's victims was constructed at Milwaukee's Forest Home Cemetery.
