= John C. Schafer =

American politician (1893–1962)

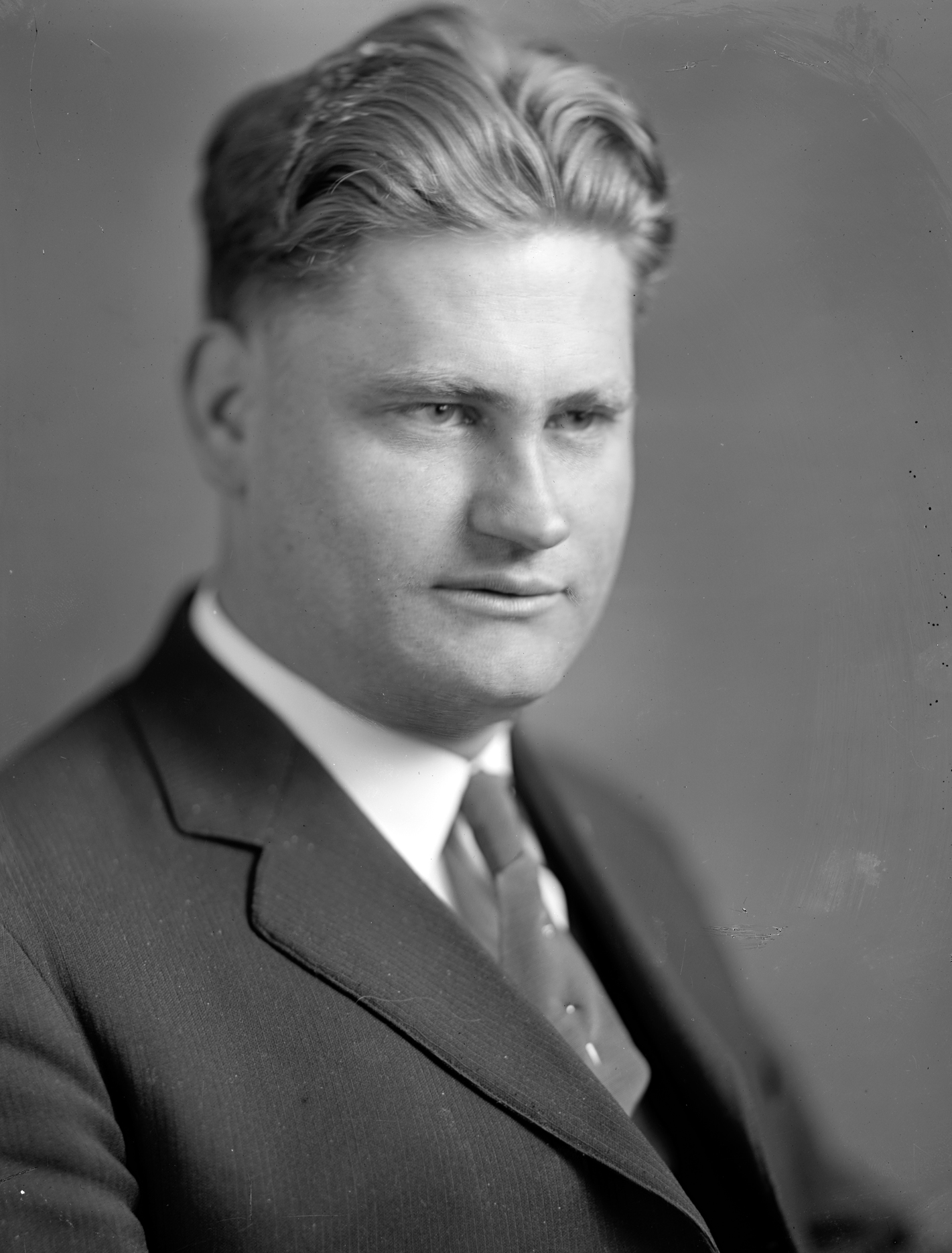
- Photo ca.1927 from the Harris & Ewing collection

Member of the U.S. House of Representatives from Wisconsin's 4th district
- In office January 3, 1939 – January 3, 1941
- Preceded by: Raymond J. Cannon
- Succeeded by: Thaddeus Wasielewski
- In office March 4, 1923 – March 3, 1933
- Preceded by: John C. Kleczka
- Succeeded by: Raymond J. Cannon

Member of the Wisconsin State Assembly from the Milwaukee 16th district
- In office January 3, 1921 – January 1, 1923
- Preceded by: George A. Bowman
- Succeeded by: Charles B. Perry

Personal details
- Born: John Charles Schafer; May 7, 1893 Milwaukee, Wisconsin, U.S.
- Died: June 9, 1962 (aged 69) Pewaukee, Wisconsin, U.S.
- Cause of death: Heart attack
- Resting place: Arlington Park Cemetery, Greenfield, Wisconsin
- Party: Republican
- Spouse: Elsie V. Webster (m. 1923–1962)
- Children: biological; Leslie (Lautenbach)^{(b. 1925; died 1993)}; adopted; Shirley (Smith)^{(b. 1918; died 1972)}; Wilbur Brandt^{(b. 1919; died 1994)}; Lorraine Janet (Purnell)^{(b. 1922; died 2006)}
- Occupation: Train driver, politician

Military service
- Allegiance: United States
- Branch/service: United States Army
- Years of service: 1917–1919
- Unit: 13th Reg. U.S. Engineers
- Battles/wars: World War I

John Charles Schafer (May 7, 1893 – June 9, 1962) was an American railroad operator and Republican politician from Milwaukee County, Wisconsin. He served six terms in the U.S. House of Representatives, representing Wisconsin's 4th congressional district from 1923 to 1933, and from 1939 to 1941. Initially a member of the progressive faction of Republicans, Schafer fell out with progressive leadership after the death of U.S. senator Robert M. La Follette Sr. and then became a supporter of the stalwart faction. Late in his career, he drifted into extreme anti-communism and was a defender of the Nazi German American Bund in the lead-up to World War II. Schafer was a member of the Steuben Society, a German American group that later came out in favor of Nazism.

Earlier in his career, he served one term in the Wisconsin State Assembly (1921). He was noted for his large physical presence, booming voice, and pompadour hairstyle; he was described as weighing 270 lbs in 1928.

== Early life and war service ==
John C. Schafer was born in Milwaukee, Wisconsin, in 1893. He attended West Allis High School until his junior year, when he dropped out to go to work as an office boy at the Allis-Chalmers Manufacturing Company, and eventually went to work on the assembly line.

When the United States entered World War I, Schafer enlisted in the United States Army with the 13th Engineer Regiment. He was deployed to France for 22 months; the 13th Engineer Regiment worked on railway engineering, and was initially attached to the French 4th Army at Champagne. Later they attached to the French 2nd Army at Verdun, Saint-Mihiel, and the Meuse–Argonne offensive.

After returning from the war, he was employed as a railroad fireman and engineman for the Chicago and Northwestern Railroad.

== Wisconsin Assembly ==
Through his work in the railroad industry, he became an active member of the Brotherhood of Locomotive Firemen and Enginemen labor union. He was also active in the American Legion and the Veterans of Foreign Wars, and served as vice commander of the Wisconsin department of the VFW in the early 1920s.

In 1920, Schafer won his first public office, when he was elected to the Wisconsin State Assembly, running on the Republican Party ticket. He represented Milwaukee County's 16th Assembly district, which then comprised roughly the town and city of Wauwatosa and a small part of the city of Milwaukee. He faced only a socialist opponent in the general election and won by a wide margin.

In his term in the Assembly, Schafer quickly made news. Called socialist, un-American, and anarchistic, he pushed for a resolution calling for Congress to "conscript" the wealthy of America to pay the nation's debts from World War I. The resolution came close to receiving a majority in his caucus, with support from progressive and farm-labor Republicans. Two years later, after being elected to Congress, Schafer was still adamant about this idea, describing it as a fair balance for the boys who were drafted and sent to war.

== Congress ==
Wisconsin's 4th congressional district 1912–1931

Rather than running for re-election to the Assembly, in 1922 he entered the race for U.S. House of Representatives in Wisconsin's 4th congressional district following the retirement of incumbent John C. Kleczka. At the time, the 4th district comprised all of the southern half of Milwaukee County, including the southern half of the city of Milwaukee, and the town and city of Wauwatosa.

In the Republican primary, Schafer identified as a progressive ally of U.S. Senator Robert M. "Fighting Bob" La Follette. Initially five other candidates entered the Republican primary for the open seat, but three candidates withdrew from the race and consolidated their support behind John L. Grunwald, a staffer for the incumbent U.S. representative, Kleczka. The withdrawn candidates, George Czerwinski, Francis E. Davidson, and Frank Mackut Jr., indicated that their withdrawal was intended to block Schafer—who they described as a "radical"—from obtaining the nomination. The sixth candidate in the race was Delbert Miller, mayor of West Allis and a former state representative. Schafer narrowly prevailed in the three-way contest, receiving 37% of the vote.

In the general election, conservative Republicans still sought to block Schafer from the seat, providing support to the socialist candidate, Edmund T. Melms. Schafer won another very close race, defeating Melms by just 631 votes. Schafer credited his election victory to strong support from organized labor.

Schafer was described by the Green Bay Press-Gazette as the first member of Congress to be sworn in wearing a cap. In describing Schafer's appearance, they said he looked like he had just stepped out of a locomotive cab and still had grime on his hands. He was one of the youngest representatives that Wisconsin ever sent to Congress, being just 29 when sworn in; in his first term he was sometimes referred to as the "baby congressman".

In 1924, Schafer was a strong supporter of Robert La Follette's unsuccessful bid for the Republican presidential nomination. He continued supporting La Follette as he pursued a third party bid for the presidency under his Progressive Party banner. Schafer, however, ran for re-election in his seat as a Republican, but faced another contested primary. He prevailed by a safe margin this time, receiving 57% of the vote against state senator George Czerwinski and James D. Reilly. Schafer won the general election by a similarly comfortable margin, defeating Socialist Leo Krzycki and Democrat Thomas H. Dorr.

Returning to the 69th Congress, Schafer's standing in the caucus was severely damaged by his support of La Follette in the 1924 election. He was one of eleven rebel Republicans targeted for expulsion from the caucus by speaker Nicholas Longworth, but the full caucus split over whether to enforce the proposed punishment. Schafer however remained defiant and stated that he did not intend to return to the caucus anyway. Ultimately all of the Wisconsin Republicans were stripped of their committee seniority.

=== Split with progressive leadership ===
After Robert La Follette Sr. died in 1925, Schafer considered running in the U.S. Senate special election to succeed him. He was reluctant to support 30-year-old Robert M. La Follette Jr., but ultimately fell in line to avoid division within the progressive faction. He ended up splitting with progressives the next year anyway, over the 1926 U.S. Senate election. The incumbent senator, Irvine Lenroot was already considered a progressive, but Schafer and others contemplated a primary challenge against him. Ultimately, progressive governor John J. Blaine, who was then widely seen as orchestrating the progressive movement in the state, chose to run against Lenroot. Schafer chose not to run for Senate, but blasted Blaine's candidacy and his ally, gubernatorial candidate Herman L. Ekern, referring to their Madison operation as a "self-perpetuating oligarchy." Schafer instead threw his support behind the conservative Republican faction of Fred R. Zimmerman. Most Wisconsin progressives stuck with Blaine, and Robert La Follette Jr. publicly withdrew his support for Schafer. Schafer's move against Blaine would also cost him many of his labor union endorsements, including the national organization of his own Brotherhood of Locomotive Firemen and Enginemen. Schafer faced no opponent in his congressional primary, but the state progressive organization threw their support behind socialist candidate Edmund T. Melms in the general election. Nevertheless, Schafer won his third term by a respectable margin, defeating Melms and Democratic attorney William J. Kershaw.

After the election, Schafer continued his crusade against Blaine, calling for investigations into his finances and those of Blaine-aligned anti-prohibition organizations which had advertised aggressively during the campaign. But shortly into the 70th Congress, Schafer also fell out with Zimmerman, who had been elected governor; Schafer denounced Zimmerman's tax policy and called for investigations into his 1926 campaign expenditures, while continuing to attack Blaine and La Follette in the same statement. Later that year, he called on the Wisconsin Legislature to enact a corrupt practices act with stronger enforcement measures. Several Wisconsin newspapers speculated that Schafer would launch a primary challenge against La Follette in 1928, others speculated that he would run for mayor of Milwaukee, but Schafer ultimately chose to run for another term in the House. His split with the progressives deepened in 1928, as he supported Herbert Hoover for president against Blaine's preferred candidate George W. Norris.

Blaine and La Follette determined to try to end Schafer's career in 1928, supporting a primary challenge by Cudahy city attorney Edward G. Minor. Despite losing most of his national and institutional allies, Schafer still won renomination and defeated Minor, taking 70% of the primary vote. While running in his own primary, Schafer took time to lob attacks at the progressive gubernatorial candidate, Joseph D. Beck, who was also defeated. At the general election, Schafer was an outspoken advocate for the Republican ticket, headed by Hoover, and recalled the record of Robert La Follette Sr. to defend Hoover and attack his Democratic opponent, Al Smith. Schafer won his fourth term with 44% of the vote.

Due to his support in the presidential election, Schafer was given preferential treatment for nominating candidates for presidential appointments under Hoover, in a shift away from the old Republican power-brokers in Wisconsin. He faced a progressive primary challenge again in 1930, this time from 29-year-old attorney Charles H. Quirk, but survived again with 61% of the vote. He went on to another comfortable victory in the general election. In the 1932 primary, Schafer defeated Quirk again, but in the general election the progressives threw their support behind Franklin D. Roosevelt and the Democratic ticket. Coupled with the national mood in the Great Depression, the Democrats won a landslide election in 1932, and Schafer lost badly to Democrat Raymond J. Cannon.

Schafer left office in March 1933, but before he did, he was able to vote for passage of the Twenty-first Amendment to the United States Constitution, the beginning of the end of Prohibition in the United States. Schafer had been a leader of the anti-prohibition forces in Congress, and was described as the floor leader for their faction since 1930.

=== Out of office ===
Shortly after leaving office, Schafer was appointed to the board which reviewed veterans' pension claims in Milwaukee. Within a year, however, Schafer was planning his return to office. He initially flirted with a run for U.S. Senate against La Follette Jr., but ultimately decided to run again for his former seat in the U.S. House of Representatives. During 1934, the Wisconsin Progressive Party formally split from the Republican Party of Wisconsin. This simplified Schafer's path to the Republican nomination—he faced no primary opponent—but complicated the general election. Cannon won re-election with just 38.5% of the vote; Schafer came in a distant second with progressive Laurence C. Gram and socialist Marvin V. Baxter each taking substantial percentages.

In December 1935, Schafer declared a run for mayor of Milwaukee against socialist incumbent Daniel Hoan in 1936. Schafer did not advance to the general election, coming in a distant third in the nonpartisan primary, behind Hoan and Milwaukee sheriff Joseph J. Shinners.

Undeterred by his defeat in the mayoral primary, Schafer entered the race for U.S. House again three months later. Unlike 1934, he faced a competitive primary in 1936 against two opponents, but prevailed with 59% of the vote. At the general election though, Schafer again fell to a distant third, receiving just 21% of the vote.

=== Return to Congress ===
Schafer made a third bid to reclaim his seat in 1938, and once again had to win a primary against two opponents. On the Democratic side, the incumbent Raymond Cannon lost his primary to attorney Thaddeus Wasielewski. Cannon, however, decided to then make an independent bid for re-election, and split the Democratic vote. Schafer managed to win a narrow plurality, polling just 637 votes ahead of Wasielewski in the general election.

During the 76th Congress, Schafer spent much of his time engaged in Red Scare agitation, alleging communist infiltration of the Roosevelt administration and denouncing individuals he believed were identified with communist interests. He argued for the deportation of Walter Krivitsky and frequently targeted labor leader John L. Lewis for personal attacks and innuendo. Schafer's activities became so extreme that a fellow U.S. representative, Kent E. Keller, referred to him as the leader of the "Silver Shirts", referring to the fascist Silver Legion of America. Schafer also found himself aligned with the Nazis on other issues—he favored all isolationist bills in the Congress and strongly resisted attempts to provide weapons or other war materiel to England or France; he also proposed that the U.S. should demand payment from France and England of World War I debts. He also ran to the defense of the Nazi-supporting German American Bund and their training camp near Grafton, Wisconsin, comparing it to the YMCA. During an interview with John Roy Carson, Schafer prophesized, "There will be purges and Roosevelt will be cleaned right off the earth along with the Jews. We'll have a military dictatorship to save the country." He also voted in favor of creating American concentration camps, intended for the detention of aliens whose country of origin would not readmit them.

Schafer faced no opponent in the Republican primary in 1940. At the general election, he faced a rematch with Thaddeus Wasielewski with progressive former state senator Leonard Fons also in the race. The configuration resulted in a close three-way outcome, with Wasielewski prevailing with 35.6%; Schafer finished in third place, but still received 31.5%.

Despite his earlier isolationist positions, after the attack on Pearl Harbor, Schafer offered to again serve the United States in World War II. A few months later, Schafer announced he would make another bid for re-election to the U.S. House of Representatives. He again won the Republican primary, but fell far short of Wasielewski in the general election. Despite losing by more than 17,000 votes, Schafer attempted to contest the results of the 1942 election. Schafer alleged that Wasielewski overspent the personal campaign expenditure limit and violated the corrupt practices act for failing to file complete reports of his campaign committees. The House Committee on Elections heard evidence in September 1943 and ruled in March 1944 to dismiss Schafer's complaint.

== Later political activities ==
In 1945, Schafer became commander-in-chief of the United American War Veterans, an obscure national veterans organization which claimed 10,000 members at the time. In 1952 he attempted to convert the organization into a political party as the United American War Veterans Political Party. That did not stop him, however, from making another run for U.S. House of Representatives on the Republican Party ticket later that year. Despite a field of 10 other candidates in the Republican primary, Schafer prevailed with just 19.5% of the vote. He went on to face the incumbent Democrat, Clement Zablocki, in the general election and lost in a landslide. Schafer ran one final time in 1954, but lost in another landslide to Zablocki.

After the death of U.S. senator Joseph McCarthy in 1957, Schafer made one final bid for public office, running in the special election to succeed him. He faced a field of six other prominent Republicans in the primary race and came in last, receiving only 1,906 votes (0.6%).

== Personal life and family ==
John C. Schafer was the third of eight children born to Ernest John Schafer and his wife Grace Evaline (née Schlenger). For some years in his childhood, the family resided in the log cabin house built by Schafer's great-grandfather, who had emigrated to the United States from Alsace–Lorraine.

On November 2, 1923, Schafer secretly married Mrs. Elsie Fay (née Webster) in Waukegan, Illinois. Elsie brought one daughter from her previous marriage and they adopted two other children. They also had one daughter together. Elsie Schafer was found liable in 1934 for a death and two injuries in a Washington, D.C., automobile accident in 1932; they were obliged to pay $9,700 in compensation (about $227,000 adjusted for inflation).

In the last years of his life, Schafer resided at the home of his brother, Michael, in Pewaukee, Wisconsin. He died there of a heart attack on June 9, 1962. At the time of his death, his wife was living in Massachusetts.

== Electoral history ==
=== Wisconsin Assembly (1920) ===
Year	Election	Date	Elected				Defeated				Total	Plurality
1920	General	Nov. 2	John C. Schafer	Republican	5,354	78.54%	J. T. O. Baird	Soc.	1,463	21.46%	6,817	3,891

=== U.S. House (1922–1942) ===
Year	Election	Date	Elected				Defeated				Total	Plurality
1922	Primary	Sep. 5	John C. Schafer	Republican	8,827	37.68%	John L. Grunwald	Rep.	8,433	36.00%	23,428	394
1922	Primary	Sep. 5	John C. Schafer	Republican	8,827	37.68%	Delbert Miller	Rep.	6,118	26.11%	23,428	394
1922	General	Nov. 7	John C. Schafer	Republican	19,179	46.04%	Edmund T. Melms	Soc.	18,548	44.52%	41,661	631
1922	General	Nov. 7	John C. Schafer	Republican	19,179	46.04%	Joseph F. Drezdzon	Dem.	3,918	9.40%	41,661	631
1924	Primary	Sep. 2	John C. Schafer (inc)	Republican	13,697	57.63%	George Czerwinski	Rep.	7,584	31.91%	23,768	6,113
1924	Primary	Sep. 2	John C. Schafer (inc)	Republican	13,697	57.63%	James D. Reilly	Rep.	2,486	10.46%	23,768	6,113
1924	General	Nov. 4	John C. Schafer (inc)	Republican	30,837	49.63%	Leo Krzycki	Soc.	19,770	31.82%	62,131	11,067
1924	General	Nov. 4	John C. Schafer (inc)	Republican	30,837	49.63%	Thomas H. Dorr	Dem.	11,524	18.55%	62,131	11,067
1926	General	Nov. 2	John C. Schafer (inc)	Republican	20,324	48.00%	Edmund T. Melms	Soc.	14,911	35.22%	42,341	5,413
1926	General	Nov. 2	John C. Schafer (inc)	Republican	20,324	48.00%	William J. Kershaw	Dem.	7,099	16.77%	42,341	5,413
1928	Primary	Sep. 4	John C. Schafer (inc)	Republican	21,532	70.76%	Edward G. Minor	Rep.	8,898	29.24%	30,430	12,634
1928	General	Nov. 6	John C. Schafer (inc)	Republican	37,685	44.06%	William J. Kershaw	Dem.	28,956	33.86%	85,527	8,729
1928	General	Nov. 6	John C. Schafer (inc)	Republican	37,685	44.06%	Walter Polakowski	Soc.	18,885	22.08%	85,527	8,729
1930	Primary	Sep. 16	John C. Schafer (inc)	Republican	28,282	61.60%	Charles H. Quirk	Rep.	17,630	38.40%	45,912	10,652
1930	General	Nov. 4	John C. Schafer (inc)	Republican	26,763	46.63%	William F. Quick	Soc.	20,789	36.22%	57,396	5,974
1930	General	Nov. 4	John C. Schafer (inc)	Republican	26,763	46.63%	William J. Kershaw	Dem.	8,871	15.46%	57,396	5,974
1930	General	Nov. 4	John C. Schafer (inc)	Republican	26,763	46.63%	Joseph A. Hansen	Proh.	531	0.93%	57,396	5,974
1930	General	Nov. 4	John C. Schafer (inc)	Republican	26,763	46.63%	John Kasun	Comm.	442	0.77%	57,396	5,974
1932	Primary	Sep. 20	John C. Schafer (inc)	Republican	30,357	59.69%	Charles H. Quirk	Rep.	20,504	40.31%	50,861	9,853
1932	General	Nov. 8	Raymond J. Cannon	Democratic	61,058	51.00%	John C. Schafer (inc)	Rep.	33,609	28.07%	119,727	27,449
1932	General	Nov. 8	Raymond J. Cannon	Democratic	61,058	51.00%	Walter Polakowski	Soc.	24,377	20.36%	119,727	27,449
1932	General	Nov. 8	Raymond J. Cannon	Democratic	61,058	51.00%	Carl Lester	Ind.	683	0.57%	119,727	27,449
1934	General	Nov. 6	Raymond J. Cannon (inc)	Democratic	33,886	38.55%	John C. Schafer	Rep.	19,840	22.57%	87,903	14,046
1934	General	Nov. 6	Raymond J. Cannon (inc)	Democratic	33,886	38.55%	Marvin V. Baxter	Soc.	18,166	20.67%	87,903	14,046
1934	General	Nov. 6	Raymond J. Cannon (inc)	Democratic	33,886	38.55%	Laurence C. Gram	Prog.	15,364	17.48%	87,903	14,046
1934	General	Nov. 6	Raymond J. Cannon (inc)	Democratic	33,886	38.55%	Harold Hartley	Comm.	633	0.72%	87,903	14,046
1936	Primary	Sep. 15	John C. Schafer	Republican	4,885	59.23%	Peter F. Piasecki	Rep.	2,312	28.03%	8,247	2,573
1936	Primary	Sep. 15	John C. Schafer	Republican	4,885	59.23%	William V. Thompson	Rep.	1,050	12.73%	8,247	2,573
1936	General	Nov. 3	Raymond J. Cannon (inc)	Democratic	63,565	47.25%	Paul Gauer	Prog.	42,029	31.24%	134,524	21,536
1936	General	Nov. 3	Raymond J. Cannon (inc)	Democratic	63,565	47.25%	John C. Schafer	Rep.	28,930	21.51%	134,524	21,536
1938	Primary	Sep. 20	John C. Schafer	Republican	12,262	60.23%	Edward F. Zunk	Rep.	4,674	22.96%	20,360	7,588
1938	Primary	Sep. 20	John C. Schafer	Republican	12,262	60.23%	William V. Thompson	Rep.	3,424	16.82%	20,360	7,588
1938	General	Nov. 8	John C. Schafer	Republican	34,196	32.00%	Thaddeus Wasielewski	Dem.	33,559	31.40%	106,864	637
1938	General	Nov. 8	John C. Schafer	Republican	34,196	32.00%	Paul Gauer	Prog.	30,817	28.84%	106,864	637
1938	General	Nov. 8	John C. Schafer	Republican	34,196	32.00%	Raymond J. Cannon (inc)	Ind.D.	7,498	7.02%	106,864	637
1938	General	Nov. 8	John C. Schafer	Republican	34,196	32.00%	Robert Sprague	Union	794	0.74%	106,864	637
1940	General	Nov. 5	Thaddeus Wasielewski	Democratic	57,381	35.62%	Leonard Fons	Prog.	52,907	32.84%	161,084	4,474
1940	General	Nov. 5	Thaddeus Wasielewski	Democratic	57,381	35.62%	John C. Schafer (inc)	Rep.	50,796	31.53%	161,084	4,474
1942	Primary	Sep. 15	John C. Schafer	Republican	10,624	48.46%	Lansing Hoyt	Rep.	4,860	22.17%	21,922	5,764
1942	Primary	Sep. 15	John C. Schafer	Republican	10,624	48.46%	Charles A. Madison	Rep.	4,257	19.42%	21,922	5,764
1942	Primary	Sep. 15	John C. Schafer	Republican	10,624	48.46%	Peter Kuczynski	Rep.	2,181	9.95%	21,922	5,764
1942	General	Nov. 3	Thaddeus Wasielewski (inc)	Democratic	46,819	48.79%	John C. Schafer	Rep.	29,104	30.33%	95,955	17,715
1942	General	Nov. 3	Thaddeus Wasielewski (inc)	Democratic	46,819	48.79%	John C. Brophy	Prog.	17,468	18.20%	95,955	17,715
1942	General	Nov. 3	Thaddeus Wasielewski (inc)	Democratic	46,819	48.79%	Robert Buech	Soc.	2,535	2.64%	95,955	17,715

=== U.S. House (1952, 1954) ===
Year	Election	Date	Elected				Defeated				Total	Plurality
1952	Primary	Sep. 9	John C. Schafer	Republican	13,712	19.46%	Robert L. Quirk	Rep.	10,568	14.99%	70,479	3,144
1952	Primary	Sep. 9	John C. Schafer	Republican	13,712	19.46%	James J. Arnold	Rep.	9,820	13.93%	70,479	3,144
1952	Primary	Sep. 9	John C. Schafer	Republican	13,712	19.46%	Lawrence Kuehn	Rep.	6,171	8.76%	70,479	3,144
1952	Primary	Sep. 9	John C. Schafer	Republican	13,712	19.46%	Willard A. Brueckner	Rep.	5,717	8.11%	70,479	3,144
1952	Primary	Sep. 9	John C. Schafer	Republican	13,712	19.46%	Joseph Kujawa	Rep.	5,442	7.72%	70,479	3,144
1952	Primary	Sep. 9	John C. Schafer	Republican	13,712	19.46%	Charles C. Cochran	Rep.	4,908	6.96%	70,479	3,144
1952	Primary	Sep. 9	John C. Schafer	Republican	13,712	19.46%	Delbert Fowler	Rep.	4,232	6.00%	70,479	3,144
1952	Primary	Sep. 9	John C. Schafer	Republican	13,712	19.46%	Ervin W. Kopaczewski	Rep.	3,958	5.62%	70,479	3,144
1952	Primary	Sep. 9	John C. Schafer	Republican	13,712	19.46%	Hilbert T. Pagel	Rep.	3,836	5.44%	70,479	3,144
1952	Primary	Sep. 9	John C. Schafer	Republican	13,712	19.46%	Paul A. Schmelter	Rep.	2,115	3.00%	70,479	3,144
1952	General	Nov. 4	Clement Zablocki (inc)	Democratic	131,098	64.27%	John C. Schafer	Rep.	72,869	35.73%	203,967	58,229
1954	Primary	Sep. 14	John C. Schafer	Republican	6,881	30.12%	Robert L. Quirk	Rep.	5,359	23.46%	22,848	1,522
1954	Primary	Sep. 14	John C. Schafer	Republican	6,881	30.12%	Anthony Gruszka	Rep.	3,939	17.24%	22,848	1,522
1954	Primary	Sep. 14	John C. Schafer	Republican	6,881	30.12%	Lawrence Kuehn	Rep.	3,076	13.46%	22,848	1,522
1954	Primary	Sep. 14	John C. Schafer	Republican	6,881	30.12%	William Burke	Rep.	2,348	10.28%	22,848	1,522
1954	Primary	Sep. 14	John C. Schafer	Republican	6,881	30.12%	Paul A. Schmelter	Rep.	1,245	5.45%	22,848	1,522
1954	General	Nov. 2	Clement Zablocki (inc)	Democratic	100,120	71.09%	John C. Schafer	Rep.	40,723	28.91%	140,843	59,397

=== U.S. Senate (1957) ===
United States Senate Special Election in Wisconsin, 1957
Party	Candidate	Votes	%	±%
Special Republican Primary, July 30, 1957
Republican	Walter J. Kohler Jr.	109,256	34.43%	
Republican	Glenn Robert Davis	100,532	31.68%	
Republican	Alvin O'Konski	66,784	21.05%	
Republican	Warren P. Knowles	23,996	7.56%	
Republican	Henry P. Hughes	7,488	2.36%	
Republican	Gerald Lorge	7,326	2.31%	
Republican	John C. Schafer	1,906	0.60%	
Plurality		8,724	2.75%	
Total votes		317,288	100.0%	

Wisconsin State Assembly
Preceded by George A. Bowman	Member of the Wisconsin State Assembly from the Milwaukee 16th district January 3, 1921 – January 1, 1923	Succeeded by Charles B. Perry
U.S. House of Representatives
Preceded by John C. Kleczka	Member of the U.S. House of Representatives from Wisconsin's 4th congressional district March 4, 1923 – March 4, 1933	Succeeded by Raymond Joseph Cannon
Preceded by Raymond Joseph Cannon	Member of the U.S. House of Representatives from Wisconsin's 4th congressional district January 3, 1939 – January 3, 1941	Succeeded by Thaddeus Wasielewski
