= Senator Fons =

Senator Fons may refer to:

- Leonard Fons (1903–1956), Wisconsin State Senate
- Louis Fons (1878–1959), Wisconsin State Senate
