= Cieszyński =

Cieszyński (feminine: Cieszyńska; plural: Cieszyńscy) is a Polish surname. Notable people with the surname include:

- Antoni Cieszyński (1882–1941), Polish physician
- Frank Cieszynski (1882–unknown), American politician
- Janusz Cieszyński (born 1988), Polish politician
- Władysław Cieszyński (1891–1939), Polish journalist

== See also ==
- Cieszyn County
