= Senator Daggett =

Senator Daggett may refer to:

- Beverly Daggett (1945–2015), Maine State Senate
- David Daggett (1764–1851), U.S. Senator for Connecticut
- Harry Daggett (1857–1933), Wisconsin State Senate
