= Leonard Fons =

American politician (1903–1956)

Member of the Wisconsin Senate from the 7th district
- In office January 5, 1931 – January 7, 1935
- Preceded by: Herbert H. Smith
- Succeeded by: Max Galasinski

Personal details
- Born: October 30, 1903 Milwaukee, Wisconsin, U.S.
- Died: May 25, 1956 (aged 52) Milwaukee, Wisconsin, U.S.
- Cause of death: Stroke
- Resting place: Saint Adalberts Cemetery, Milwaukee, Wisconsin
- Party: Republican; Wisc. Progressive (1940)
- Parent: Louis Fons (father)
- Education: Marquette University; Georgetown University Law Center

Leonard Casimir Fons (October 30, 1903 – May 25, 1956) was an American lawyer and Republican politician. He was a member of the Wisconsin State Senate from 1931 to 1935 representing southern Milwaukee County.

== Biography ==
Fons was born on October 30, 1903, in Milwaukee, Wisconsin. His father, Louis Fons, was also a member of the Senate, having represented the 8th District. Fons went to Marquette University High School and Campion High School in Prairie du Chien, Wisconsin. He then graduated from Marquette University and received his law degree from Georgetown University Law Center. Fons practiced law in Milwaukee. He died in Milwaukee, Wisconsin on May 25, 1956, of a stroke.

== Career ==
Fons was a member of the Senate from 1931 to 1934 as a Republican. In 1940, he was a candidate for the United States House of Representatives from Wisconsin's 4th congressional district as a member of the Wisconsin Progressive Party, losing to Thaddeus Wasielewski.

== Electoral history ==
=== Wisconsin Senate (1930) ===
Wisconsin Senate, 7th District Election, 1930
Party	Candidate	Votes	%	±%
General Election, November 4, 1930
Republican	Leonard C. Fons	8,096	49.89%	
Socialist	Andrew J. King	5,728	35.30%	
Democratic	William H. Park	2,256	13.90%	
Communist	Max Kagan	148	0.91%	
Plurality		2,368	14.59%	
Total votes		16,228	100.0%	
Republican hold				

=== Wisconsin Circuit Court (1940) ===
Wisconsin Circuit Court, 2nd Circuit, Branch 3 Election, 1940
Party	Candidate	Votes	%	±%
General Election, April 5, 1940
Nonpartisan	Roland J. Steinle (incumbent)	131,959	50.15%	
Nonpartisan	Leonard C. Fons	131,190	49.85%	
Plurality		769	0.29%	
Total votes		263,149	100.0%	

=== U.S. House (1940) ===
Wisconsin's 4th Congressional District Election, 1940
Party	Candidate	Votes	%	±%
General Election, November 5, 1940
Democratic	Thaddeus Wasielewski	57,381	35.62%	+4.22%
Progressive	Leonard C. Fons	52,907	32.84%	+4.01%
Republican	John C. Schafer (incumbent)	50,796	31.53%	−0.47%
Plurality		4,474	2.78%	+2.18%
Total votes		161,084	100.0%	+50.74%
Democratic gain from Republican		Swing	3.37%	

Wisconsin Senate
Preceded by Herbert H. Smith	Member of the Wisconsin Senate from the 7th district January 5, 1931 – January 7, 1935	Succeeded by Max Galasinski
