= Frank Kubatzki =

Polish-American politician

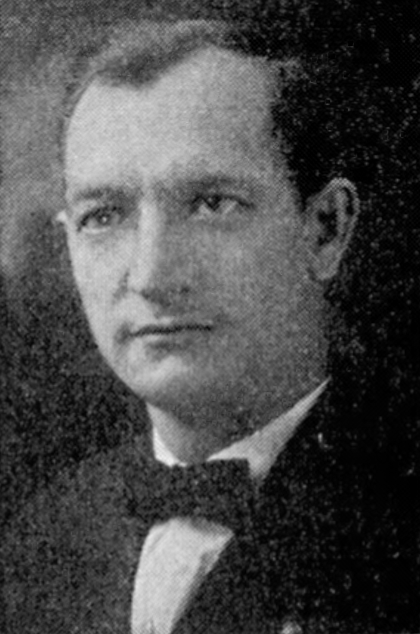

Member of the Wisconsin State Assembly
- In office 1915, 1917, 1919
- Constituency: 8th Milwaukee County District

Personal details
- Born: Frank Stanley Kubatzki; May 12, 1877 Prussian partition, German Empire
- Died: September 18, 1947 (aged 70)
- Party: Democratic
- Occupation: Blacksmith, politician

Frank Stanley Kubatzki (May 12, 1877 – September 18, 1947) was a Polish-American blacksmith from Milwaukee who served three terms as a Democratic member of the Wisconsin State Assembly representing the 8th Milwaukee County District (8th Ward of the City of Milwaukee).

== Background ==
Kubatzki was born in 1877 in the part of Poland within the German Empire. He came to America with his parents at the age of two and settled in Milwaukee. He was educated in a parochial school and night school, and became a blacksmith by trade. He served in the Army's First Wisconsin Volunteers from the outbreak of the Spanish–American War until he was mustered out in October 1898. Returning home, he returned to his trade until he lost the use of two limbs due to a disease contracted while in the service, and had to dispose of his business. He would eventually be awarded a monthly pension of $72 in 1926, apparently as a result of lobbying by Congressman John C. Schafer.

== Legislative service ==
He was elected to the assembly in 1914 and was re-elected in 1916 and 1918, receiving 1,147 votes at the 1918 general election to 756 for Socialist Frank Cieszynski. He was defeated for re-election in 1920 by Socialist Walter Polakowski. In 1922 he attempted to re-gain his old seat, but came in third, losing to Polakowski's younger brother John Polakowski, who received 2,191 votes to 1,471 for Republican Louis Polewczwnski and 856 for Kubatzki.
