= H. G. Tucker =

American politician

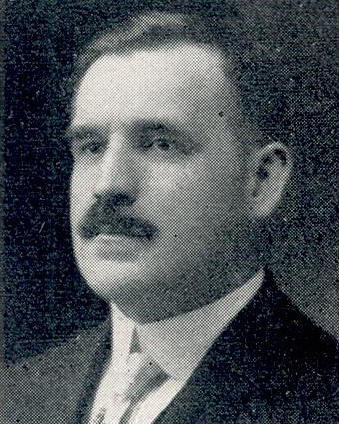
Tucker's official State Assembly portrait, 1923

Herman G. Tucker (January 19, 1879 – November 26, 1936?) was a machinist and politician from Milwaukee, Wisconsin, who served one term as a Socialist member of the Wisconsin State Assembly.

== Background ==
Tucker was born January 19, 1879, in Germany, and received a public and trade school education. After serving an apprenticeship as a machinist, he worked in that trade in a variety of places in Europe and (after coming to the United States in 1905) in several Eastern U.S. cites, before coming to Wisconsin in 1907. He had been a member of organized labor for 25 years and connected with the Socialist movement for over 20 years, holding various offices in both movements, before his election the Assembly, at which time he was working as a tool and die maker.

== Legislative service ==
Tucker was elected to the Assembly in November, 1922 to represent the Fifth Milwaukee County assembly district (the 5th and 12th Wards of the City of Milwaukee), combining the old Fifth and Twelfth Milwaukee County districts which had been represented by Republicans Edmund Benjamin Grundwald and Julius Jensen respectively. Tucker had run against Jensen in the 1920 race for the 12th District seat, losing with 1640 votes to Jensen's 1766.

In 1922, Tucker received 2,734 votes to 1,820 for Republican Peter M. Peterson and 528 for Democrat John J. Bonk. Tucker was assigned to the standing committee on labor. In 1924, Tucker (who had been elected a member of the Milwaukee County Board of Supervisors) did not run for re-election, and Jensen defeated former Socialist State Senator Frank Raguse and Democrat F. H. Blank, to regain the seat for the Republican party.

== After the Assembly ==
Tucker was re-elected to the Milwaukee County Board in 1928, and was instrumental in the passage of an old age pension plan for Milwaukee County in 1929, a project he had been advocating for some years. Tucker remained active as a member of the Machinists Union; as of 1932, he was still Financial Secretary of the Milwaukee Lodge of the IAM. In spring of 1936, he was defeated for re-election to the County Board by Leon Szymanski.

=== Death mystery ===
In November 1936, Tucker's automobile was found near a fishing cottage on the shore of Pewaukee Lake in Waukesha County, Wisconsin, which was used by a fishing club to which he belonged. Tucker had been keeping a tavern in Cudahy, and had disappeared. Tucker had been married for four years to Mary Frank, widow of John Frank (the former operator of the Cudahy tavern).

A blood-stained razor, a pool of blood, Tucker's overcoat, and an envelope addressed "To the sweetest girl I ever loved" were found in an outbuilding, along with a trail of blood leading down to the lakeshore. Police estimated that two quarts of blood had been lost.
