= Harry Daggett =

American politician (1857-1933)

Member of the Wisconsin Senate from the 8th district
- In office January 5, 1925 – January 2, 1933
- Preceded by: George Czerwinski
- Succeeded by: William Shenners Jr.

Personal details
- Born: February 25, 1857 Linn County, Iowa, U.S.
- Died: July 14, 1933 (aged 76) Minneapolis, Minnesota, U.S.
- Resting place: Forest Home Cemetery, Milwaukee
- Party: Republican
- Spouse: Frances N. Thompson (m. 1882–1933)
- Children: Mary Daggett Slocum^{(b. 1884; died 1968)}; James H. Daggett^{(b. 1885; died 1965)}; John Minot Daggett^{(b. 1887; died 1948)}
- Occupation: Real estate

Harry Bertram Daggett (February 25, 1857 – July 14, 1933) was an American businessman and Republican politician from Milwaukee County, Wisconsin. He served two terms in the Wisconsin Senate, representing Wisconsin's 8th Senate district from 1925 to 1933.

== Background ==
Daggett was born in Linn County, Iowa and later moved to West Milwaukee, Wisconsin. Daggett served as a member of the Wisconsin State Senate from 1925 to 1932. He also served as the mayor of West Milwaukee, Wisconsin and a member of the West Milwaukee Village Board. He was a Republican.

Daggett died in Minneapolis in 1933.
