= Arthur J. Balzer =

American politician

Arthur J. Balzer (March 6, 1895 - January 31, 1962) was an American merchant and lecturer from West Allis, Wisconsin, who served several terms as a member of the Wisconsin State Assembly from Milwaukee County, first in the 1930s and again for a single term in the 1950s.

== Early life and education ==
Balzer was born March 6, 1895, in Mequon, Wisconsin, the son of Constantine Balzer, a public school teacher. During World War I, he served as a hospital corpsman in the United States Navy. He attended Marquette University, studying political science; he was a cheerleader, and in 1922 won a medal for "proficiency in debate".

== Career ==
In 1924, he became a resident of West Allis. He went into what he described as "general merchandising business", and became a part-time lecturer.

He was first elected to the Assembly's 3rd Milwaukee County district in 1932, at which time he was in the real estate business, unseating Republican incumbent Allen Busby. He received 7,728 votes; Busby 5,234; Socialist Frank Puncer 3,757, and independent Grace Brown 165. He was a Democrat, but in the Wisconsin Blue Book for 1933 described himself specifically as a "Progressive Democrat", in a state where the term "Progressive" had a special significance. He was assigned to the standing committee on labor, serving as its chairman.

Busby in turn defeated Balzer in 1934 by 65 votes, running as a candidate of the newly organized Wisconsin Progressive Party, with 4,793 votes to Balzer's 4,728, Puncer's 2,740, and Republican Bruce Randolph's 965. Balzer reclaimed the seat in 1936 (still describing himself as a "Progressive Democrat") and was re-elected in 1938, in each case over a Progressive Party candidate. (In the 1938 election, he actually tied the Progressive, but under the existing law was seated after his name was drawn from a hat.) This time, he listed himself as a "Liberal Democrat" in the Blue Book.

In 1940, he ran for the Wisconsin Senate as a Republican, but lost in the primary. He ran as a write-in candidate for his Assembly seat, but lost to William Luebke, the Progressive was defeated two years before, with Balzer coming in a distant fourth in a five-way race.

He was elected once more in 1954 from the newly created 21st Milwaukee County Assembly district (the 3rd Ward of West Allis, the Town of Wauwatosa, and the 7th and 8th Wards of the City of Wauwatosa) as a Democrat, defeating former Republican Assemblyman Louis Hicks. He was assigned to the committee on labor. Balzer was unseated in the 1956 Democratic primary election by Richard J. Lynch, who would lose the general election by 69 votes to Republican Robert R. Heider (although Lynch would go on to win the 21st district in later years).

Since Balzer was no longer in the Assembly, in 1957 Robert Heider announced that a speech on the Assembly floor in commemoration of Abraham Lincoln's birthday, a custom which the sometime Democrat Balzer had long observed when he was in office, would be needed. He then yielded the floor to fellow Republican Elmer L. Genzmer for that purpose.

== Death ==
Balzer died January 31, 1962, in the Wood Veteran's Hospital in Milwaukee.
