= Senator Kleczka =

Senator Kleczka may refer to:

- Jerry Kleczka (1943–2017), Wisconsin State Senate
- John C. Kleczka (1885–1959), Wisconsin State Senate
