= Frank Raguse =

American politician

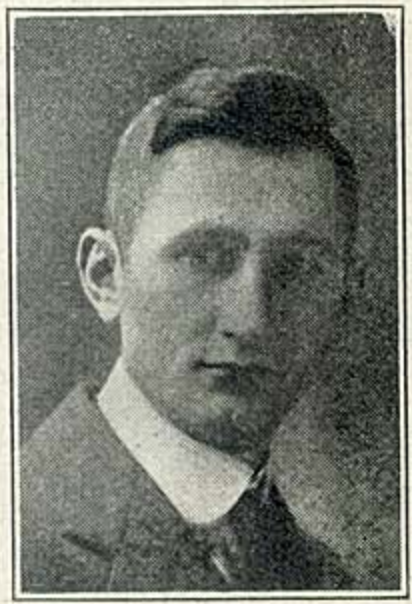

Member of the Wisconsin Senate from the 8th district
- In office January 1, 1917 – April 27, 1917
- Preceded by: Alexander E. Martin
- Succeeded by: Louis Fons

Personal details
- Born: January 31, 1887 German Empire
- Died: January 30, 1966 (aged 78) Elkhorn, Wisconsin, U.S.
- Resting place: Oak Ridge Cemetery, East Troy, Wisconsin
- Party: Socialist

Frank Raguse (January 31, 1887 – January 30, 1966) was a German American laborer and Socialist politician from Milwaukee, Wisconsin. He was elected to represent Milwaukee in the Wisconsin State Senate, but was expelled after four months due to controversy over comments deemed "unpatriotic".

== Background ==
Raguse was born in Germany in 1887. He came to the United States with his parents in 1892 when he was five years of age and resided in Milwaukee ever since. He attended the Milwaukee Public Schools, dropping out at the age of 13 "to earn his own living... at various occupations" (in the words of his official biographical note).

== Senate service ==
He was a self-described "unskilled laborer" when he was elected to Wisconsin's 8th State Senate district (the 5th, 8th, 11th, 12th and 23rd wards of the city of Milwaukee) in 1916, receiving 4,945 votes against 3,690 for Herbert H. Manger (Democrat), 3,440 for A. E. Martin (Republican) and 150 for S. P. Todd (Progressive).

== Expulsion ==
On April 26, 1917, Raguse became only the second member of the Wisconsin legislature ever to be expelled, when the Senate voted to remove him for contempt of the Senate after he refused to sign a statement that he: claimed to be an American citizen; reaffirmed his allegiance to the United States; and retracted and apologized for comments that were deemed unpatriotic by those opponents. In an April 24 speech on the floor of the Senate, Raguse had specifically accused the McKinley administration of having plotted the sinking of the Maine in order to bring about the Spanish–American War, and stated that the same spirit was present at the current time. He apologized to the Senate for his "tactless" remarks, and offered to put the apology in writing; and volunteered to join the armed forces himself, if an able-bodied non-Socialist senator would agree to join along with him. However, Raguse refused to sign the statement written by his political opponents, which he deemed a virtual retraction of his Socialist principles, and which implied that his status as a citizen was subject to question.

Some press coverage over the years has claimed that Raguse was the first Wisconsin legislator to be expelled; but James Vineyard had been expelled from the council (the predecessor of the State Senate) of the Wisconsin Territory in 1842 for shooting and killing a fellow legislator, Charles C. P. Arndt, on the floor of that body (an incident remarked upon by Charles Dickens).

== After expulsion ==
Raguse later went to work in his brother's welding plant in Rockford, Illinois, to become a mechanic, and was blinded in an industrial accident in which carbide exploded. He attended the Wisconsin School for the Blind, taught himself to type, and opened a small candy store in Milwaukee on National Avenue. He nonetheless remained active in politics, and in 1924 was the Socialist nominee for the Wisconsin State Assembly in Milwaukee's 5th district when Socialist incumbent H. G. Tucker did not run for re-election. Raguse received 2,282 votes to 2,506 for former Republican Assemblyman Julius Jensen (who had represented part of the district in the past) and 937 for Democrat F. H. Blank.
