= Allen Busby =

American politician (1900–1988)

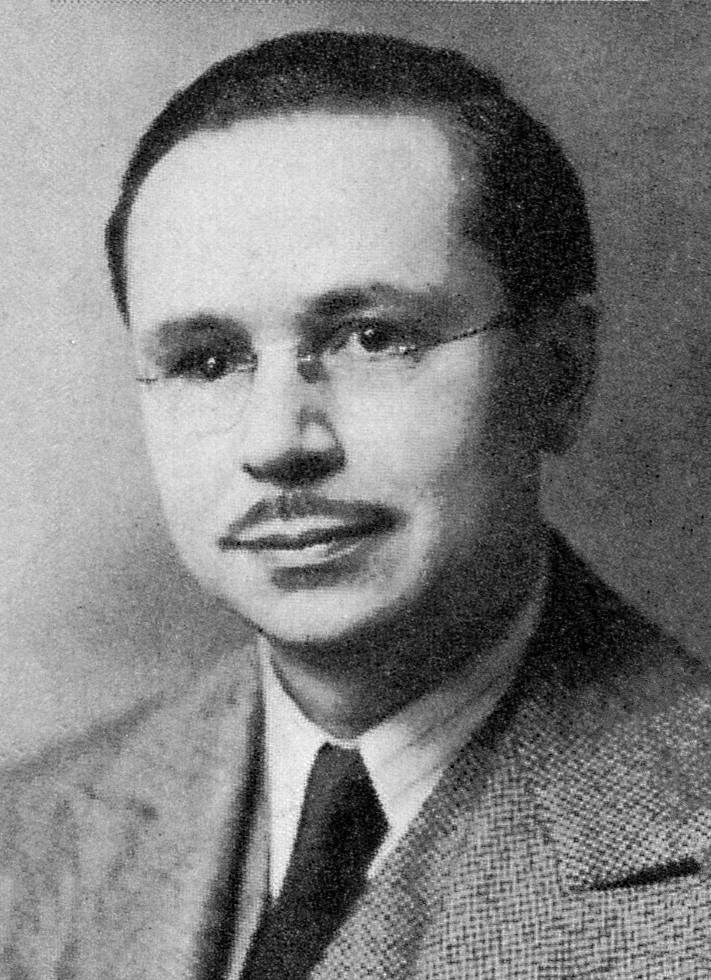
Allen J. Busby

Allen J. Busby (March 6, 1900 – July 19, 1988) was an American politician, educator, and lawyer from West Milwaukee, Wisconsin.

== Background ==
Born in Chicago, Illinois, on March 6, 1900, Busby graduated from West Allis Central High School. He studied at Wisconsin State Normal School, then 1922 earned a B.A. from the University of Wisconsin–Madison (UW–M), and in 1925 received an M.A. in history and political science. After studying law at the University of Chicago, he returned to UW–M, where he received his LL.B. in 1928 and was admitted to the bar. Busby was principal of the high school at Little Chute, Wisconsin for two years, and taught English and history in West Allis Central High School from 1928 to 1933.

== Public office ==
Busby served as the village attorney for West Milwaukee, then was elected to the Wisconsin State Assembly in 1930 as a Republican. He was defeated in 1932 by Democrat Arthur Balzer (Balzer got 7,728 votes; Busby 5,234; Socialist Frank Puncer 3,757, and independent Grace Brown 165). He in turn defeated Balzer in 1934 running as a candidate of the newly organized Wisconsin Progressive Party, with 4,793 votes to Balzer's 4,728, Puncer's 2,740, and Republican Bruce Randolph's 965.

In 1936 he was elected to the Wisconsin State Senate's 8th district as a Progressive, with 22,209 votes to 19,180 for Democratic incumbent William Shenners Jr. and 11,632 for Republican Henry Weber. He served in the Senate, first as a Progressive and then as a Republican, until he chose not to run for re-election in 1972.

== Personal life ==
Busby continued to work as an attorney, and was the landlord of rental property in the Milwaukee area. In 1979, he was accused of racial discrimination in apartment rentals, but settled out of court on undisclosed terms. He was again accused of discrimination in 1981, but declared, "We have several coloreds in the building. It seems to me that [the plaintiffs] are just trying to make trouble."

He was married, and a Mason.
