= John Polakowski =

American politician

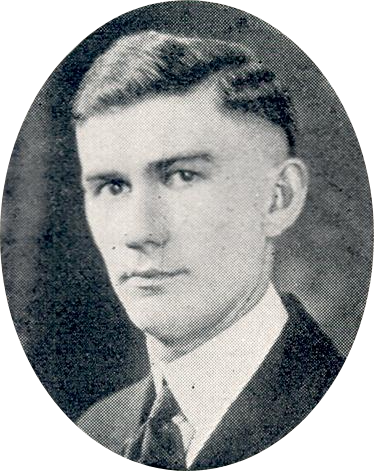
Polakowski c. 1923

John J. Polakowski (born July 7, 1896) was a retail clerk, dispatcher and real estate broker from Milwaukee who served one term (1923–1924) as a Socialist member of the Wisconsin State Assembly from the 8th Milwaukee County district (8th and 14th wards of the City of Milwaukee). He was the brother of Walter Polakowski.

== Background ==
Polakowski was born in Buffalo, New York, on July 7, 1896, to a family of Polish descent. He came to Milwaukee with his parents about 1900. He was educated in parochial schools, night and high schools. He was working as a salesman at Schuster's department store when elected.

== Assembly service ==
He had never held public office before, when elected to the Assembly in the November, 1922, election; he received 2,191 votes to 1,471 for Republican Louis Polewczwnski and 856 for Democrat Frank Kubatzki (whom his brother Walter had unseated in 1920). Part of the newly-redistricted district had been represented by Walter, the rest by fellow Socialist Stephen Stolowski. In that same election Walter advanced from the Assembly to the Wisconsin State Senate.

John did not run for re-election in 1924, and was succeeded by fellow Socialist Frank Cieszynski.

== After the assembly ==
In 1925, Polakowski was appointed as a fire alarm operator for the City of Milwaukee fire department, and was on that job as of the Milwaukee City Hall fire on the evening of October 9, 1929, during which he and two colleagues remained at their posts on the sixth floor of City Hall while firefighters struggled to control the blaze.

He was working as a real estate broker when his wife Anna died December 26, 1959, at the age of 65, at which time they had eight children. Daniel's full name was Daniel Webster Hoan Polakowski; he had been named after Socialist Milwaukee mayor Dan Hoan.

In 1965–1970 Polakowski was an organizer of the Allied Council of Senior Citizens, a senior citizens' rights organization in Milwaukee; at one point he was their president. As of 1969, he was supervisor of Project Involve, an anti-poverty program aimed at helping the elderly.
