= William J. Cary =

American politician (1865–1934)

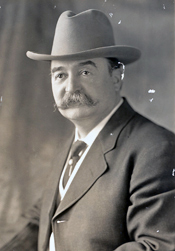

Clerk of Milwaukee County
- In office January 1, 1921 – January 1, 1933
- Preceded by: George Hampel
- Succeeded by: George F. Breitbach

Member of the U.S. House of Representatives from Wisconsin's 4th district
- In office March 4, 1907 – March 3, 1919
- Preceded by: Theobald Otjen
- Succeeded by: John C. Kleczka

Sheriff of Milwaukee County
- In office January 1, 1905 – January 1, 1907
- Preceded by: Fred Tegtmeyer
- Succeeded by: William R. Knell

Personal details
- Born: March 22, 1865 Milwaukee, Wisconsin, U.S.
- Died: January 2, 1934 (aged 68) Milwaukee, Wisconsin, U.S.
- Resting place: Calvary Cemetery, Milwaukee
- Party: Republican; Democratic (1912)
- Spouse: Alma Louise Clark (m. 1889–1934)
- Children: William J. Cary Jr.; (b. 1905; died 1971)
- Occupation: Telegraph operator

William Joseph Cary Sr. (March 22, 1865 – January 2, 1934) was an American telegraph operator and progressive Republican politician from Milwaukee, Wisconsin. He served six terms in the U.S. House of Representatives, representing the southern half of Milwaukee County from 1907 to 1919. He attributed his defeat in 1918 to his opposition to the U.S. entry into World War I.

Before his election to Congress, he served two years as sheriff of Milwaukee County, and served on the Milwaukee Common Council. After leaving Congress, he was elected county clerk in Milwaukee, and served ten years in that office.

== Early life ==
William Cary was born March 22, 1865, in Milwaukee, Wisconsin, a child of Irish American immigrants. His mother died when he was 11 years old, and his father was unable to care for him or his younger siblings. His siblings were placed in an orphanage, and William went to work as a cash-boy at Timothy Chapman's general store. He left that job to work as a telegraph messenger; he studied telegraphy at night, and at age 18 he was employed as a telegraph operator. After a year of saving, he retrieved his siblings from the orphanage and brought them to live with him.

== Elected office ==
Cary was elected a member of the board of aldermen of Milwaukee in 1900 and was reelected in 1902 for the term ending in 1904. He served as sheriff of Milwaukee County from 1904 to 1906.

Cary was elected as a Republican to the Sixtieth Congress, representing Wisconsin's 4th congressional district. He was re-elected in 1908 and 1910. In 1912, he initially sought renomination as a Republican, but switched and announced he would run for the Democratic nomination as a "non-partisan" candidate. He won the Democratic nomination and defeated the Republican nominee in the general election. He won two more terms, running as a Republican in 1914 and 1916, and ultimately served from (March 4, 1907, to March 3, 1919).

On April 5, 1917, he was one of 50 representatives who voted against declaring war on Germany.

He was an unsuccessful candidate for renomination in 1918 to the Sixty-sixth Congress, losing the Republican nomination to John C. Kleczka. He served as county clerk of Milwaukee County from 1921 to 1933.

== Death and interment ==
Cary's grave at Calvary Cemetery

He died in Milwaukee, Wisconsin, January 2, 1934, and is interred at Calvary Cemetery.

Political offices
Preceded by George Hampel	Clerk of Milwaukee County; January 1, 1921 – January 1, 1933	Succeeded by George F. Breitbach
U.S. House of Representatives
Preceded by Theobald Otjen	Member of the U.S. House of Representatives from Wisconsin's 4th congressional district March 4, 1907 – March 3, 1919	Succeeded by John C. Kleczka
Legal offices
Preceded by Fred Tegtmeyer	Sheriff of Milwaukee County; January 1, 1905 – January 1, 1907	Succeeded by William R. Knell
