= Julius Edward Roehr =

American politician

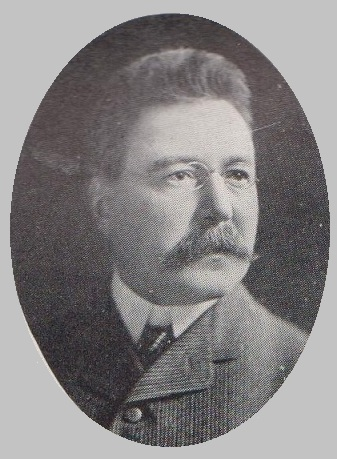

Member of the Wisconsin Senate from the 8th district
- In office 1897–1908
- Preceded by: Michał Kruszka
- Succeeded by: John C. Kleczka

Personal details
- Born: March 6, 1860 Brooklyn, New York
- Died: January 31, 1930 (aged 69) Milwaukee, Wisconsin
- Party: Republican

Julius Edward Roehr was a member of the Wisconsin State Senate.

== Biography ==
Roehr was born on March 6, 1860, in Brooklyn, New York. He moved to Wisconsin in 1873, settling in Milwaukee, Wisconsin. Roehr graduated from the University of Wisconsin-Madison and began practicing law. He died in Milwaukee on January 31, 1930.

== Political career ==
Roehr was an unsuccessful candidate for the Wisconsin State Assembly in 1892. That year, he was also a candidate to be a superior court judge. He was a delegate to the 1896 Republican National Convention before serving as a member of the Senate from 1897 to 1908.
