= Edmund T. Melms =

Factory worker, Socialist Party official

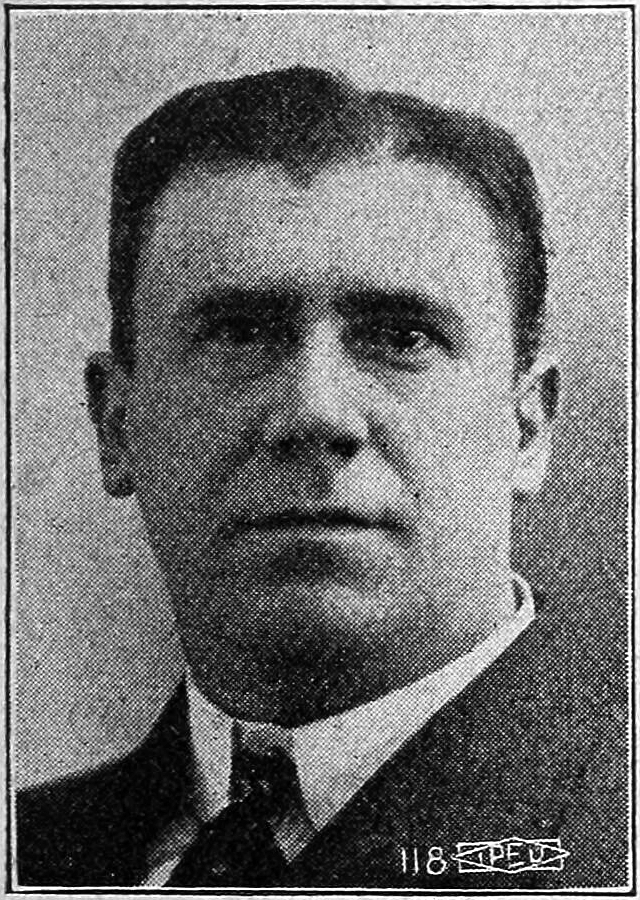
- Melms c. 1912

Sheriff of Milwaukee County
- In office 1915–1917

President of the Milwaukee Common Council
- In office 1910–1912

Member of the Milwaukee Common Council
- In office 1904–1912

Personal details
- Born: Edmund Ludwig Robert Paul Theodore Melms; 1874 Greenfield, Wisconsin, U.S.
- Died: January 6, 1933 (aged 58–59) Milwaukee, Wisconsin, U.S.
- Party: Socialist
- Spouse: Augusta (m. 1895)
- Children: 2
- Occupation: Factory worker, journalist

Edmund Ludwig Robert Paul Theodore Melms (1874–1933) was an American factory worker, journalist, Socialist Party official, and politician in Milwaukee, Wisconsin.

== Early life ==
Edmund T. Melms was born in Greenfield, Wisconsin, in 1874. He dropped out of school in 7th grade, and became a factory worker. In 1897, he co-founded what was then called the Social-Democratic Party of Wisconsin. In 1902, he became secretary of the Milwaukee County Socialist Party, serving in that position until 1927. As a Party organizer, Melms developed the "bundle brigades," which distributed Socialist literature in twelve different languages across the city. He also wrote for Victor Berger's Milwaukee Leader and Social Democratic Herald.

== Public office ==
Melms was an unsuccessful candidate for the Wisconsin State Assembly in 1902. In 1904, he was elected to the Milwaukee Common Council, and in 1910 was elected its president, serving in both positions until 1912. As an alderman, he introduced a resolution to ban the practice of transporting prisoners through the streets in uncovered patrol wagons, on the basis that it "exposed [them] to view as criminals."

Melms first ran for sheriff of Milwaukee County in 1912, but was defeated. He ran again in 1914 and won, serving from 1915 to 1917. In 1918, he was an unsuccessful candidate in a special election for the Wisconsin State Senate. Melms ran for Congress in Wisconsin’s 5th district five times between 1906 and 1926, but was never successful. The closest he came to victory was in 1922, when he lost to State Assemblyman John C. Schafer by a margin of 631 votes out of 41,645 cast.

== Later life and death ==
Melms died in Milwaukee on January 6, 1933. He is buried at Forest Home Cemetery there.

== Works ==
- The Two Johns. Milwaukee: Co-Operative Printery, c. 1900s.
