= Walter Polakowski =

American politician (1888–1966)

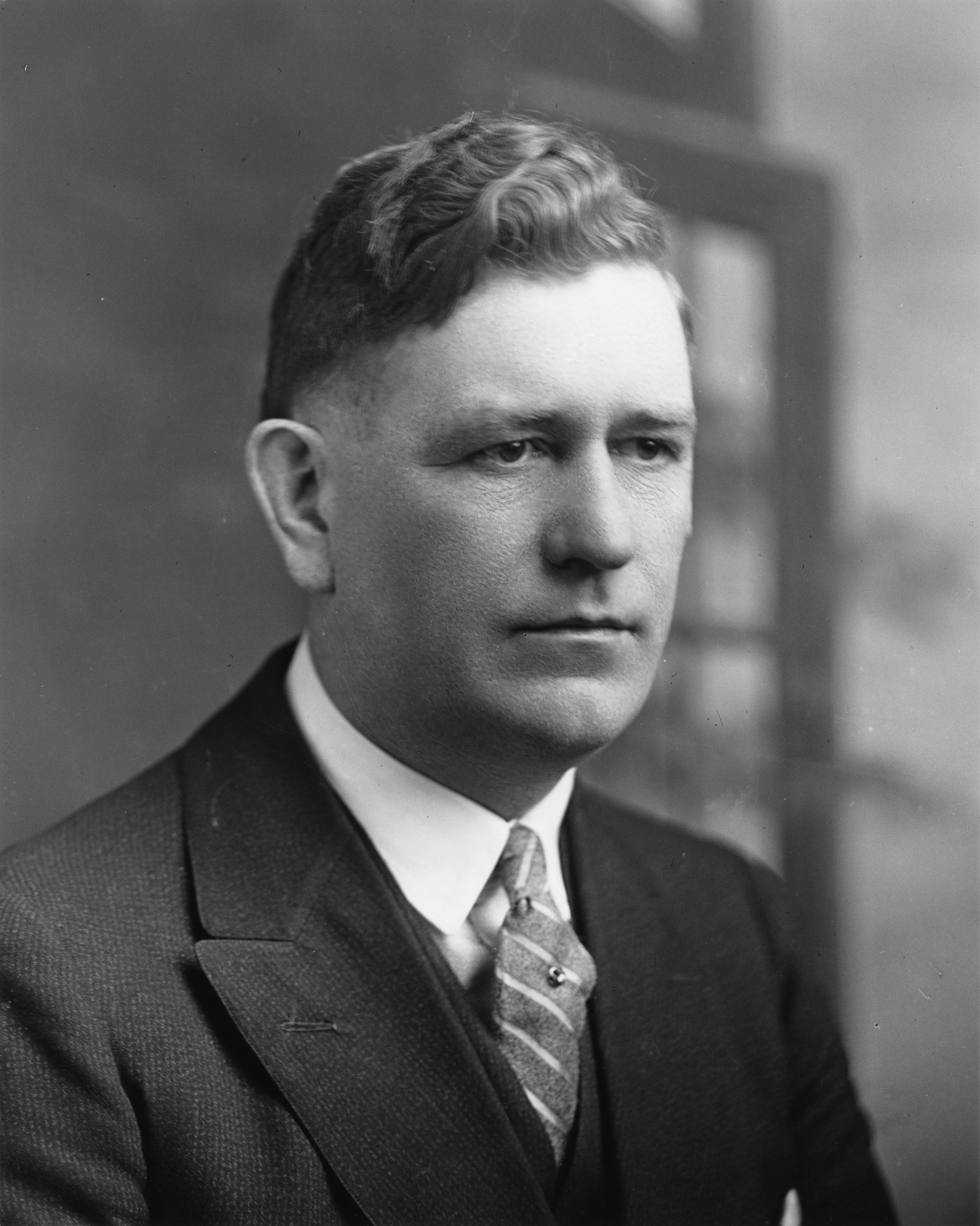
- Portrait by Roman B. J. Kwasniewski, 1925

Member of the Wisconsin Senate from the 3rd district
- In office January 1, 1923 – January 7, 1935
- Preceded by: George L. Buck
- Succeeded by: Max Galasinski

Member of the Wisconsin State Assembly from the Milwaukee 8th district
- In office January 3, 1921 – January 1, 1923
- Preceded by: Frank Kubatzki
- Succeeded by: John Polakowski

Personal details
- Born: January 18, 1888 Buffalo, New York, U.S.
- Died: November 13, 1966 (aged 78) Milwaukee, Wisconsin, U.S.
- Party: Socialist (before 1935); Progressive (1935–1946); Democratic (after 1946)
- Spouse: Catherine (m. 1907; div. 1939)
- Children: 5
- Profession: Upholsterer, trade union activist, small business owner

Walter Polakowski (January 18, 1888 – November 13, 1966) was an American upholsterer, trade union activist, and small business owner from Milwaukee, Wisconsin who served as a Socialist member of the Wisconsin State Assembly and Wisconsin State Senate for a total of 14 years. He was the older brother of John Polakowski, who succeeded him in the Assembly in 1922.

== Background ==
Polakowski was born in Buffalo, New York on January 18, 1888, to a family of Polish descent, and came to Milwaukee with his family around 1900. He began working while still a child, as a newsboy and bootblack; at the age of 14 he was apprenticed to an upholsterer, and by the age of 18 represented the Upholsterers' Union in the Milwaukee Federated Trades Council. He married Catherine at 19 and went into the grocery and saloon business, becoming a proprietor at 21. He later sold out and went into the insurance business until 1920, when he established the Union Upholstering and Auto Trim Shop. He had never held a public office until elected to the Assembly in 1920.

== Public office ==
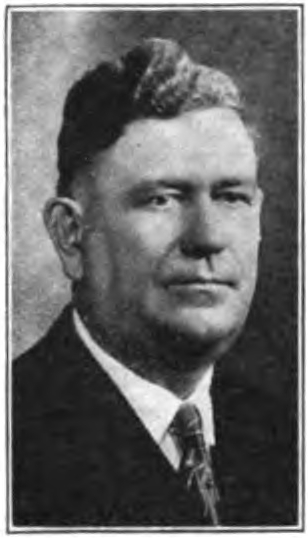
Polakowski's official State Senate portrait, 1931

In 1920, he unseated incumbent Democratic incumbent Frank Kubatzki (who had served three terms representing the 8th Milwaukee County District [8th Ward of the City of Milwaukee]), by 1593 votes to Kubatski's 1572. He was assigned to the standing committee on finance.

In the fall of 1922 he was elected to the State Senate from the 3rd District (8th, 11th, 14th and 24th wards of the City of Milwaukee), receiving 5,778 votes to 3,796 for Republican Thaddeus J. Pruss, and his younger brother John (also a Socialist) was elected to the Assembly seat which included his old district. He was assigned to the joint committees on finance and on highways. He was unopposed for re-election in 1926 (only two votes were cast against him), and was assigned to the committee on corporations and taxation. In 1928, he was the Socialist nominee for Congress from Wisconsin's 4th congressional district, losing to Republican incumbent John Schafer in a three-way race. He was re-elected in 1930, tallying more votes than his Democratic and Republican opponents combined; and remained on the corporations and finance committee. He again served as the Socialist nominee for Congress in 1932, coming in third in a four-way contest which saw Raymond Cannon oust incumbent Schafer. Polakowski was also a Wisconsin delegate at the 1932 Socialist National Convention, which was held in Milwaukee.

Before the 1934 election, his old district was eliminated during redistricting and he ran for re-election from the new 7th Senate District, which included only one ward from his old district, but added several suburban cities and townships. He was defeated by Democratic Assemblyman Max Galasinski in a four-way race.

William Evjue wrote of Polakowski and his fellow Wisconsin Socialists, "[The] lobbyists knew it was not possible to influence these men. They were incorruptible. Walter Polakowski was the same kind."

== After the legislature ==
By 1937, Polakowski was working as a union organizer for the Amalgamated Clothing Workers of America. He also worked briefly as an organizer for the Socialist Party, before being fired (allegedly for his announced intention to run for the Senate against a candidate endorsed by the Farmer-Labor Progressive Federation.

In August 1939, when his wife filed for divorce, he was working as a bartender; the couple at that time had two adult children, and a 17-year-old daughter, Phyllis.

Polakowski would twice more try to return to the Senate from the Third District, running unsuccessfully for the Progressive nomination in 1942. He sought the Democratic nomination in a 1949 special election, but campaigned openly as a Socialist, denouncing plans to introduce a "right to work" bill in the legislature.

In May 1963 a testimonial dinner was held in Polakowski's honor, at which he was termed "the father of unemployment compensation laws".

He died on November 13, 1966.
