= Louis Fons =

American politician

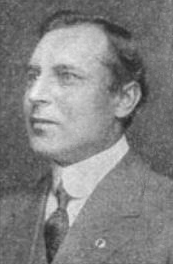

Member of the Wisconsin State Senate
- In office 1918–1920
- Constituency: 8th District

Personal details
- Born: August 25, 1878 Milwaukee, Wisconsin, US
- Died: May 15, 1959 (aged 80) Milwaukee, Wisconsin
- Party: Republican
- Occupation: Businessman, banker, newspaper publisher

Louis Fons (August 25, 1878 – May 15, 1959) was an American businessman, banker, Polish American activist and newspaper publisher from Milwaukee, Wisconsin, who served a term as a Republican member of the Wisconsin State Senate representing the 8th District.

== Background and business ==
Fons was born on August 25, 1878, in Milwaukee, Wisconsin. He was educated in parochial school and at the age of 13 went to work for M. J. Wawrzyniakowski, a real estate broker and insurance agent, earning $2 a week as a full-time office clerk. Eight years later he became a partner of his former employer and became manager. In 1910 the firm was incorporated under the name of Fons & Co., of which he was president. In 1916 he also organized the Berthelet Pipe & Supply Co., of which he was corporate secretary.

He was active in many Polish American organizations, and by 1919 was secretary of the Polish National Association, which boasted 2,500 members and over $1,000,000 in assets. At one time he published the Nowiny Polskie, a Polish language daily newspaper.

== Political career ==
In 1910, Fons was the Republican nominee for City Treasurer, but lost to Charles Whitnall in the Socialist sweep of that year. He was a delegate to the 1916 Republican National Convention. He served as a member of the State Senate from 1918 to 1920, being elected on January 2, 1918, in a special election to fill a vacancy caused by the expulsion of Socialist Frank Raguse (for suggesting that the sinking of the Maine was plotted by the McKinley administration). Fons received 4,180 votes to 3,962 for Socialist Edward Melms. He did not seek re-election, and was succeeded by fellow Republican George Czerwinski.

== Later career ==
Fons became a building contractor, remained in the real estate business, and went into banking. He remained active in Polish American affairs, being honored in 1953 by the Polish National Alliance for his work; but was not as visible in partisan politics. Although early in the Great Depression, the Southern State Bank which Fons ran had to be liquidated, at the time of his death on May 15, 1959, in Milwaukee, Wisconsin, he was president of the National Savings and Loan Association, as well as of Fons & Co.

His son, Leonard Fons, also served in the Senate.
