= Alexander E. Martin =

20th century American politician

Member of the Wisconsin Senate from the 8th district
- In office January 6, 1913 – January 1, 1917
- Preceded by: John Kleczka
- Succeeded by: Frank Raguse

Personal details
- Born: October 9, 1867 Two Rivers, Wisconsin, U.S.
- Died: 1943 (aged 75–76)
- Resting place: Fairview Mausoleum, Milwaukee (original); Graceland Cemetery, Milwaukee (re-interred)
- Party: Republican
- Occupation: Businessman

Alexander E. Martin (October 9, 1867 – 1943) was an American businessman and Republican politician from Milwaukee, Wisconsin. He represented Milwaukee's south side in the Wisconsin Senate during the 1913 and 1915 sessions.

== Background ==
Martin was born in Two Rivers, Wisconsin, but at the age of one was moved with his family to Milwaukee, where he studied at the local public schools and took a course in railroad telegraphy. Having worked in that trade for some years, in 1895 he went into the grocery business. In 1905, he was one of the incorporators of the Central Foundry company, and in 1910 of Hoyer Metallic Packing; by 1913 he was secretary of both corporations.

== Public office ==
In 1900, he was elected on the Republican ticket as a Milwaukee County supervisor, serving for two years. In 1903, he was appointed as a member of the Milwaukee School Board. In 1906, Martin was the unsuccessful Republican nominee for County Treasurer. In 1912, he was elected to the Wisconsin Senate in Wisconsin's 8th State Senate district, then comprising much of the south side of the city of Milwaukee. He prevailed with 5,899 votes, with 5,279 for Socialist assemblyman Frederick Brockhausen, 2,544 for fellow Republican Fred Lorenz, and 214 for Prohibitionist Carl Lund. (Republican incumbent John Kleczka was not a candidate.) Martin ran for re-election in 1916, but was defeated by Socialist Frank Raguse, who won with 4,945 votes, over 3,690 for Democrat Herbert Manger, 3,440 for Martin, and 150 for Prohibitionist S. P. Todd.

== Later life ==
In 1930 (by which time he was president of the A. E. Martin Foundry and Machinery company), Martin sued a local physician with whom he had a car accident; Martin asserted that "he probably never will be able to walk again as the result of injuries to his right leg".

Wisconsin Senate
Preceded by John Kleczka	Member of the Wisconsin Senate from the 8th district January 6, 1913 – January 1, 1917	Succeeded by Frank Raguse
