= Raymond J. Cannon =

American politician (1894–1951)

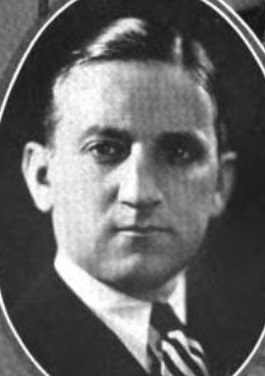

Member of the U.S. House of Representatives from Wisconsin's 4th district
- In office March 4, 1933 – January 3, 1939
- Preceded by: John C. Schafer
- Succeeded by: John C. Schafer

Personal details
- Born: August 26, 1894 Ironwood, Michigan, U.S.
- Died: November 25, 1951 (aged 57) Milwaukee, Wisconsin, U.S.
- Resting place: Holy Cross Cemetery, Milwaukee
- Party: Democratic
- Spouse: Alice Carey
- Children: 3, including Robert
- Education: Marquette University Law School
- Profession: Baseball player, attorney

Raymond Joseph Cannon (August 26, 1894 – November 25, 1951) was an American attorney, baseball player, and Democratic politician from Milwaukee, Wisconsin. He served three terms in the U.S. House of Representatives, representing Wisconsin's 4th congressional district from 1933 to 1939.

== Early life ==
Born in Ironwood, Michigan, Cannon lost both of his parents when he was six months old, went to an orphanage briefly, then was taken in and raised by family members.

He played baseball semi-professionally from 1908 to 1922, primarily as a pitcher. He pitched against the Philadelphia Phillies in a spring training exhibition game in March 1918 and gave up 13 runs on 17 hits in 9-innings. He also taught school in Minocqua, Wisconsin, in 1910 and 1911.

He attended Marquette University Law School in Milwaukee and was admitted to the bar in 1914. He became an early sports attorney whose clients included Jack Dempsey. After the Black Sox Scandal, he was retained by one of the blacklisted players, Happy Felsch (a Milwaukee native), who sued Charles Comiskey and the Chicago White Sox for back pay, World Series money, and damages. Felsch's teammates Buck Weaver, Shoeless Joe Jackson, and Swede Risberg also became Cannon's clients.

In 1922, he helped put together the short-lived National Baseball Players Association of the United States, one of several unsuccessful attempts to create a union for pro ball players. It is believed that his association with the Black Sox hurt the NBPA, and may have contributed to its collapse. In 1929 his law license was suspended, and Cannon was prevented from practicing until it was reinstated in 1931.

== Political career ==
In 1932, Cannon was the Democratic nominee for U.S. House of Representatives in Wisconsin's 4th congressional district. He won the general election, defeating Republican incumbent John C. Schafer and Socialist state representative Walter Polakowski, earning a seat in the 73rd United States Congress.

In 1934, after Cardinal Dougherty of Philadelphia called for a Roman Catholic boycott of all films, Cannon (himself a Catholic) announced plans to introduce a congressional bill, supported by both Democrats and Republicans, which would introduce Government oversight of film censorship.

Cannon was re-elected in 1934 with a 38.56% plurality in a five-way race (against Schafer, a Socialist, a Progressive, and an independent Communist; and in 1936 (a 47.25% plurality vs. Progressive Paul Gauer and Schafer).

In 1938, Cannon was unseated in the Democratic primary by Thad F. Wasielewski, but ran anyway as an independent. He lost his seat to Schafer, polling only 7,498 votes (7.02%) to Schafer's 34,196 (32.00%), Wasielewski's 33,559 (31.40%), and Progressive Gauer's 30,817 (28.84%); a Union Party candidate polled 794 votes (0.74%).

Cannon later ran unsuccessfully for the Democratic gubernatorial nomination in 1940 and 1942.

== Personal life ==
He married Alice Carey in 1915, and they had three children: Robert, Mary Alice and Jeanne. Robert, the eldest, also became an attorney, and was elected as a Wisconsin Circuit and Wisconsin Appeals Court Judge, and served as legal advisor to the Major League Baseball Players Association.

== Death ==
Cannon died in Milwaukee after suffering a heart attack. He was buried at Holy Cross Cemetery & Mausoleum in Milwaukee.

U.S. House of Representatives
Preceded by John C. Schafer	Member of the U.S. House of Representatives from Wisconsin's 4th congressional district March 4, 1933 – January 3, 1939	Succeeded by John C. Schafer
