= Clemens Michalski =

American machinist and politician (1902–1977)

Clemens F. Michalski (April 21, 1902 – October 20, 1977) was an American machinist and politician from Milwaukee, Wisconsin who represented the 12th Milwaukee County Assembly district (the 12th and 14th Wards of the City of Milwaukee), succeeding Democrat Max Galasinski (who was successfully pursuing a seat in the Wisconsin State Senate). Michalski was a U.S. Marshal for the Eastern District of Wisconsin from 1952 to December 31, 1955, after which Michalski was elected Sheriff of Milwaukee. Michalski served as sheriff from 1956 to 1960 when George J. Witkowski was elected.

== Background ==
Michalski was born on April 21, 1902, in Milwaukee, where at one time or another he attended public schools, parochial schools and night school. In 1918, he became an apprentice machinist, and continued in that profession, except for a brief time (September 1, 1933 - January 1, 1935) as an inspector for the State Athletic Commission. He worked for many years for Allis-Chalmers; and also worked part-time as a salesman of Essex and Hudson automobiles.

== Political office ==
At the time of his 1934 election to the assembly he was chairman of the Twelfth Ward Democratic Committee; the Athletic Commission position may have been a patronage appointment in the wake of the 1932 Democratic sweep of Wisconsin offices. He was the only member of the Assembly to specifically list his political affiliation as "Liberal Democrat" (the Democratic Party was not traditionally regarded as a liberal party in Wisconsin politics.)

In 1936, he ran for a position on the Milwaukee Common Council; he would remain as an alderman for 16 years. (According to a 1960 study, Assembly salaries and benefits were so low that in Milwaukee County, positions on the County Board of Supervisors and the Common Council were considered more desirable than seats in the Assembly, and an average of 23% of Milwaukee legislators did not seek re-election. This pattern was not seen to hold to the same extent in the rest of the state, where local offices tended to pay less well.) He was not a candidate in the 1936 Democratic primary for his Assembly seat, and was succeeded by Democrat Peter Pyszczynski.

Parker spent some time as a member of the central committee of the Wisconsin Democratic Party for Wisconsin's 4th congressional district. During this period, he ran a liquor store on Mitchell Street for five years, and made investments in South Side real estate.

He resigned as alderman in 1952 to accept an appointment as a United States Marshall from the Truman administration. He then resigned that position in December 1955 to seek the office of Sheriff for Milwaukee County, a position he held from 1956–1960, when he was elected as county clerk (he was not eligible to be re-elected sheriff due to term limits). Michalski, described as "a large man with a booming voice... known in the political arena as a fiery orator", became known for his malapropisms (asked about how he felt, he reportedly replied "My syracuse veins are bothering me"). When asked to speculate on the outcome of a particular case he said, "I don't have any sugar bowl." (Apparently meaning "crystal ball.") He was a delegate to the 1964 Democratic National Convention, nominally pledged to favorite son Governor John Reynolds as a presidential candidate.

In 1968, he retired as county clerk. He died October 20, 1977.
