= Max Galasinski =

20th century American politician

Maximillian Joseph Galasinski (March 18, 1879 – April 13, 1972) was an American stonecutter, sculptor, sanitation supervisor and alderman from Milwaukee, Wisconsin, who served one term as a Democratic member of the Wisconsin State Assembly and one term in the Wisconsin State Senate.

== Background ==
Galasinski was born March 18, 1879, in the same part of Milwaukee which he represented in the Assembly. He was educated in the public and parochial schools, and in night schools. From 1891 to 1893 he was an apprentice pharmacist, and in the following nineteen years learned and practiced his father's trade of stonemasonry and sculpturing, building some of the best known monuments in Milwaukee, including the Kosciuszko Monument in South Side Park. In 1912 he became a superintendent of street sanitation for the Fourteenth Ward, a position he held for sixteen years, until in 1928 he was chosen alderman for that ward. He also served as secretary of St. John Cantius Church.

== Wisconsin legislative service ==
Galasinski was one of many Democrats elected to the Assembly in the November, 1932 general election which saw Franklin Roosevelt elected to the Presidency. Galasinski was elected to represent the 12th Milwaukee County Assembly district (the 12th and 14th Wards of the City of Milwaukee), unseating incumbent Republican Ben Wiczynski (who actually came in third behind Socialist John Sobczak) and an independent candidate, after first winning a six-way Democratic primary. He was assigned to the Assembly's standing committees on commerce and manufactures, on excise and fees, and on municipalities, serving as chairman of the latter committee.

In 1934 he ran in the new 7th Senate District, which included only one ward from the old district represented by incumbent Socialist Walter Polakowski but all of Galasinski's Assembly district, and was successful in another four-way race. He was assigned to the standing committees on committees, on legislative procedure, and on state and local government, chairing the latter. He was succeeded in the Assembly by fellow Democrat Clemens Michalski.

In 1938, he was defeated in the Democratic primary for his seat in the Senate by Anthony P. Gawronski. In the wake of his loss, he accepted the nomination as the Democratic candidate for Lieutenant Governor of Wisconsin, but came in a distant third (behind the Republican and the Progressive) in a five-way race.

== After the legislature ==
Galasinski spent several years in an effort to be reinstated in his old City of Milwaukee civil service title so that he could apply for a city pension.

In 1942, Galasinski ran (unsuccessfully) in the Republican primary for the right to oppose old foe Gawronski in the general election, losing to another former Democrat, Martin F. Howard. By 1945 he was the Republican 14th Ward committeeman. He sought the Republican nomination to face Gawronski yet again in 1946, but again lost in the primary, coming in second in a four-way race.
