= George A. Bowman =

American politician (1890–1957)

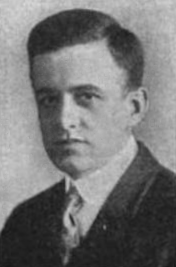

Member of the Wisconsin State Assembly
- In office 1919

Personal details
- Born: May 29, 1890 Shelbyville, Illinois, US
- Died: May 7, 1957 (aged 66) Houston, Texas, US
- Party: Republican; Wisconsin Progressive Party

George A. Bowman (1890–1957) was a member of the Wisconsin State Assembly.

== Biography ==
Bowman was born on May 29, 1890, in Shelbyville, Illinois. He attended Marquette University and Marquette University Law School. Bowman served as Milwaukee County district attorney and as register of deeds. In 1919, Bowman served in the Wisconsin State Assembly and was a Republican; in 1934, Bowman switched to the Wisconsin Progressive Party. Bowman died in Houston, Texas, on May 7, 1957, after undergoing emergency surgery.
