= John C. Kleczka =

20th century American politician

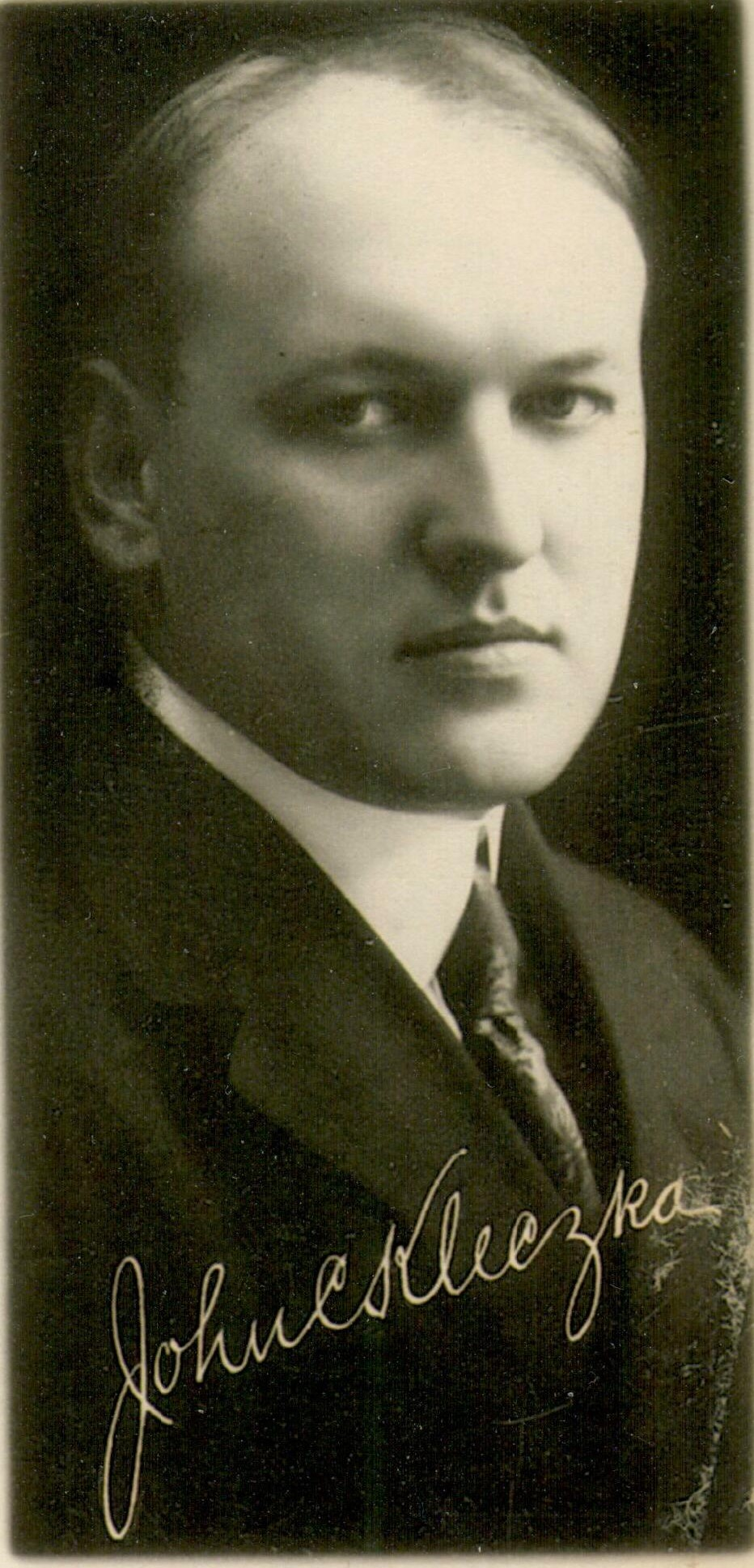

Wisconsin Circuit Court Judge for the 2nd Circuit, Branch 6
- In office April 4, 1930 – January 1, 1953
- Appointed by: Walter J. Kohler Sr.
- Preceded by: Edward T. Fairchild
- Succeeded by: Francis X. Swietlik

Member of the U.S. House of Representatives from Wisconsin's 4th district
- In office March 4, 1919 – March 3, 1923
- Preceded by: William J. Cary
- Succeeded by: John C. Schafer

Member of the Wisconsin Senate from the 8th district
- In office January 4, 1909 – January 6, 1913
- Preceded by: Julius Edward Roehr
- Succeeded by: Alexander E. Martin

Personal details
- Born: May 6, 1885 Milwaukee, Wisconsin, U.S.
- Died: April 21, 1959 (aged 73) Milwaukee, Wisconsin, U.S.
- Resting place: St. Adalberts Cemetery, Milwaukee
- Party: Republican
- Spouse: Wanda H. Kleczka
- Education: Marquette University
- Profession: Lawyer

John Casimir Kleczka (May 6, 1885 – April 21, 1959) was an American lawyer, judge, and Republican politician from Milwaukee, Wisconsin. He served two terms in the a member of the U.S. House of Representatives, representing the southern half of Milwaukee County from 1919 to 1923; he was the first Polish American elected to congress. He later served as a Wisconsin circuit court judge in Milwaukee County for nearly 23 years.

== Early life ==
Born in Milwaukee, Wisconsin, Kleczka attended parochial schools. He was graduated from Marquette University, Milwaukee, Wisconsin, in 1905. He took postgraduate courses at Catholic University at Washington, D.C., and at the University of Wisconsin–Madison, studying law. He was admitted to the bar in 1909 and commenced practice in Milwaukee.

== Political and law career ==
He served in the Wisconsin State Senate 1909–1913. He served as delegate to the Republican National Convention in 1912. He served as commissioner of the circuit court of Milwaukee County 1914–1918. He was a major judge advocate in the United States Army Reserves after the First World War.

Kleczka was elected as a Republican to the Sixty-sixth and Sixty-seventh congresses (March 4, 1919 – March 4, 1923) as the representative of Wisconsin's 4th congressional district, after taking the Republican nomination away from incumbent William J. Cary, who had been one of 50 representatives who voted against declaring war on Germany. He did not seek renomination in 1922 but returned to the practice of law.

After retirement, Kleczka was elected circuit court judge in 1930 and served until his retirement due to ill health in 1953. He was appointed a conciliation judge and court commissioner by the circuit judges in 1957 and served until his death.

== Death ==
He died in Milwaukee, Wisconsin, April 21, 1959. He was interred in St. Adalbert's Cemetery.

== Sources ==
- United States Congress. "John C. Kleczka (id: K000260)". Biographical Directory of the United States Congress.

Wisconsin Senate
Preceded by Julius Edward Roehr	Member of the Wisconsin Senate from the 8th district January 4, 1909 – January 6, 1913	Succeeded by Alexander E. Martin
U.S. House of Representatives
Preceded by William J. Cary	Member of the U.S. House of Representatives from Wisconsin's 4th congressional district March 4, 1919 – March 4, 1923	Succeeded by John C. Schafer
Legal offices
Preceded by Edward T. Fairchild	Wisconsin Circuit Court Judge for the 2nd Circuit, Branch 6 April 4, 1930 – January 1, 1953	Succeeded by Francis X. Swietlik
