= Władysław Cieszyński =

Polish journalist and political prisoner

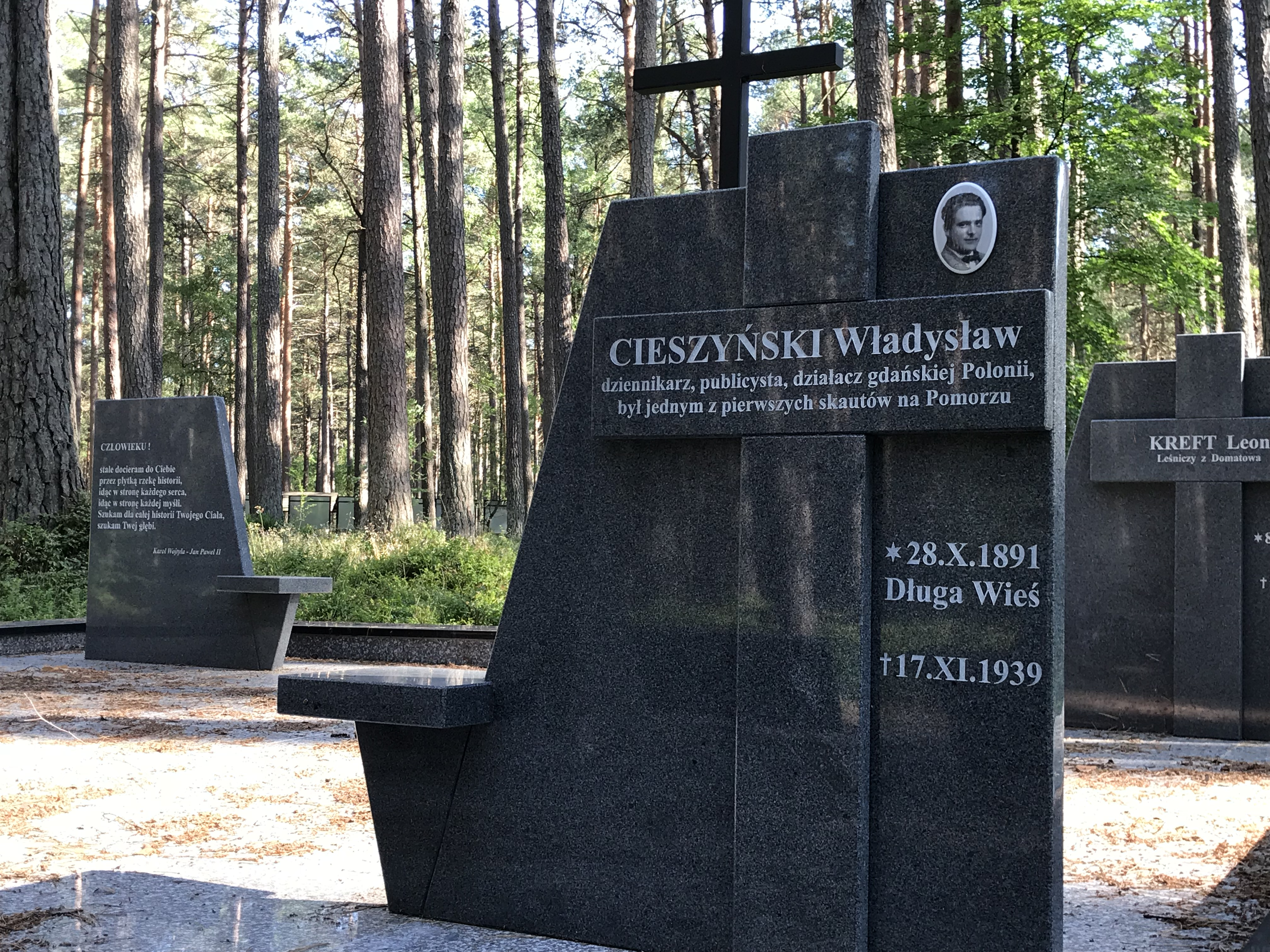
- The tombstone of Cieszyński
- Born: 28 October 1891; Kolonia Bryńska or Długa Wieś, Poland
- Died: 17 November 1939 (aged 48); Piaśnica, Poland
- Resting place: Piaśnica
- Spouse: Małgorzata Szerman (married 1919–1939)
- Awards: Gold Cross of Merit

Władysław Cieszyński (28 October 1891 – 17 November 1939) was a Polish journalist, social activist and promoter of Polish culture. He spent most of his life in the Free City of Danzig, where he worked as a co-editor for Dziennik Gdański, and later as an editor-in-chief for Gazeta Gdańska. In 1932 he was convicted for 6 months of prison for publishing an article in which he criticised the politics of the Senate of the Free City. In 1933 he was released and he started to work for Straż Gdańska. He was awarded the Gold Cross of Merit in 1938.

He cooperated with the Polish Intelligence Service by providing the surveillance of German journalists in Danzig. Cieszyński was murdered in a mass execution carried out by Nazi Germany in Piaśnica.
