= Frank Cieszynski =

American politician

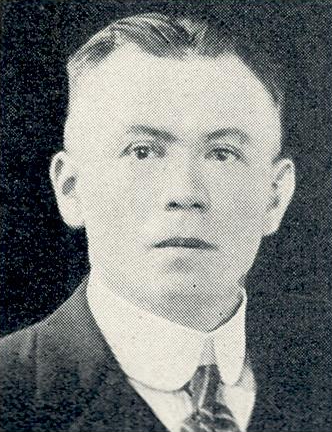
Cieszynski's official State Assembly portrait, 1925

Frank Cieszynski (December 12, 1882 - ?) was an American sailor and iron molder from Milwaukee who served one term (1925-1926) as a Socialist member of the Wisconsin State Assembly from the 8th Milwaukee County district (8th and 14th wards of the City of Milwaukee).

== Background and early career ==
Cieszynski was born in Milwaukee on December 12, 1882. He attended local parochial schools for a few years, but had to go to work at the age of twelve. He sailed on the Great Lakes until 1896, and then became an iron molder. He became a member of the Iron Molders' Union Local 125, and joined the Socialist Party in 1906.

== Public office ==
In 1918, Cieszynski (who had never held public office) was the Socialist nominee in Milwaukee County's 8th Assembly District (then consisting sole of the 8th Ward), losing to incumbent Democrat Frank Kubatzki by 1147 to 756. In 1924 Cieszynski was elected to succeed fellow Socialist John Polakowski, who did not seek re-election, winning 2500 votes to 2,317 for Republican Louis Polewczynski and 1,604 for Democrat C. W. Drewek; and was assigned to the standing committee on municipalities.

He sought re-election in 1926, but was defeated by Polewczynski in a two-way race, 2095 to 1549.
