= Delbert Miller =

American politician

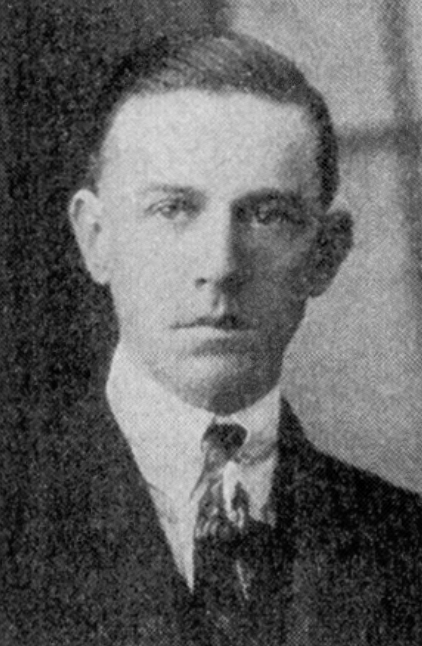

Delbert Miller was a member of the Wisconsin State Assembly.

== Biography ==
Miller was born on February 27, 1885, in Muskego, Wisconsin. He later moved with his parents to what is now West Allis, Wisconsin.

== Career ==
Miller was elected to the Assembly in 1916 and re-elected in 1918. Later, he served as Mayor of West Allis in 1937. He was a Republican.
