= William Shenners Jr. =

20th century American politician

William H. Shenners Jr. (July 21, 1902 – October 1952) was a member of the Wisconsin State Senate.

== Biography ==
Shenners was born on July 21, 1902, in Milwaukee, Wisconsin. He would become involved in real estate and insurance.

== Political career ==
Shenners was a member of the Senate from the 8th district from 1933 to 1936. He was a Democrat.
