= Wisconsin's 8th Senate district =

American legislative district in Milwaukee County and Ozaukee County, Wisconsin

Wisconsin's 8th State Senate district
- 2024 map defined in 2023 Wisc. Act 94; 2022 map defined in Johnson v. Wisconsin Elections Commission; 2011 map was defined in 2011 Wisc. Act 43 composed of Assembly districts 22, 23, and 24
Senator
| Jodi Habush Sinykin; D–Whitefish Bay |
since January 6, 2025 (1 year, 231 days)
- Demographics: 85.75% White; 5.29% Black; 2.73% Hispanic; 4.56% Asian; 1.06% Native American; 0.1% Hawaiian/Pacific Islander
- Population (2020) • Voting age: 178,122; 138,478
- Website: Official website
- Notes: Milwaukee metro area (north)

The 8th Senate district of Wisconsin is one of 33 districts of the Wisconsin Senate. Located in southeast Wisconsin, the district includes most of Ozaukee County along with northeastern Milwaukee County, southeast Washington County, and northeast Waukesha County. It contains the cities of Cedarburg, Port Washington, and Mequon, as well as the villages of Bayside, Butler, Fox Point, Grafton, Lannon, Menomonee Falls, River Hills, Thiensville, Whitefish Bay, and most of the villages of Brown Deer and Germantown. As currently drawn, the district is the wealthiest state senate district in the state.

== Current elected officials ==
Jodi Habush Sinykin is the senator representing the 8th district. She was first elected in the 2024 general election, and is serving her first term.

Each Wisconsin State Senate district is composed of three State Assembly districts. The 8th Senate district comprises the 22nd, 23rd, and 24th Assembly districts. The current representatives of those districts are:

- Assembly District 22: Paul Melotik (R–Grafton)
- Assembly District 23: Deb Andraca (D–Whitefish Bay)
- Assembly District 24: Dan Knodl (R–Germantown)

The 8th Senate district, in its current borders, crosses three different congressional districts. The Milwaukee County portions of the district fall within Wisconsin's 4th congressional district, represented by U.S. representative Gwen Moore; the Washington County and Waukesha County portions of the district fall within Wisconsin's 5th congressional district, represented by U.S. representative Scott L. Fitzgerald; and the Ozaukee County portions of the district fall within Wisconsin's 6th congressional district, represented by U.S. representative Glenn Grothman.

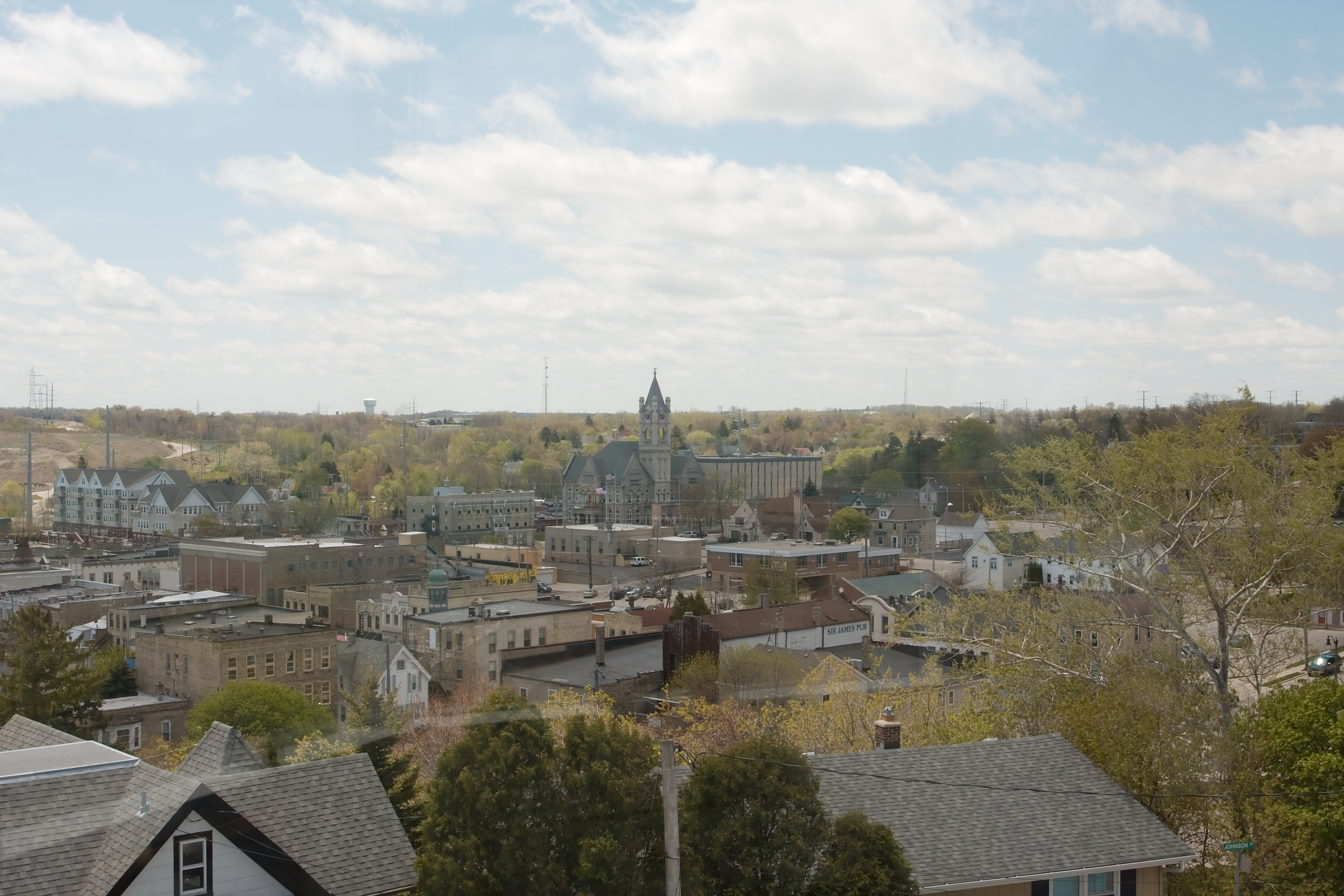
Downtown Port Washington

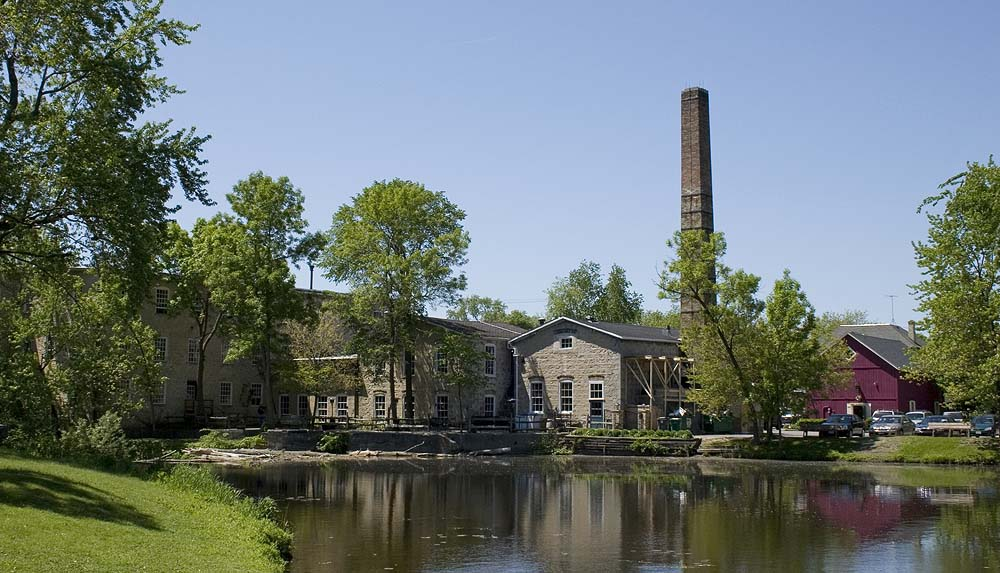
Hilgen and Wittenberg Woolen Mill in Cedarburg

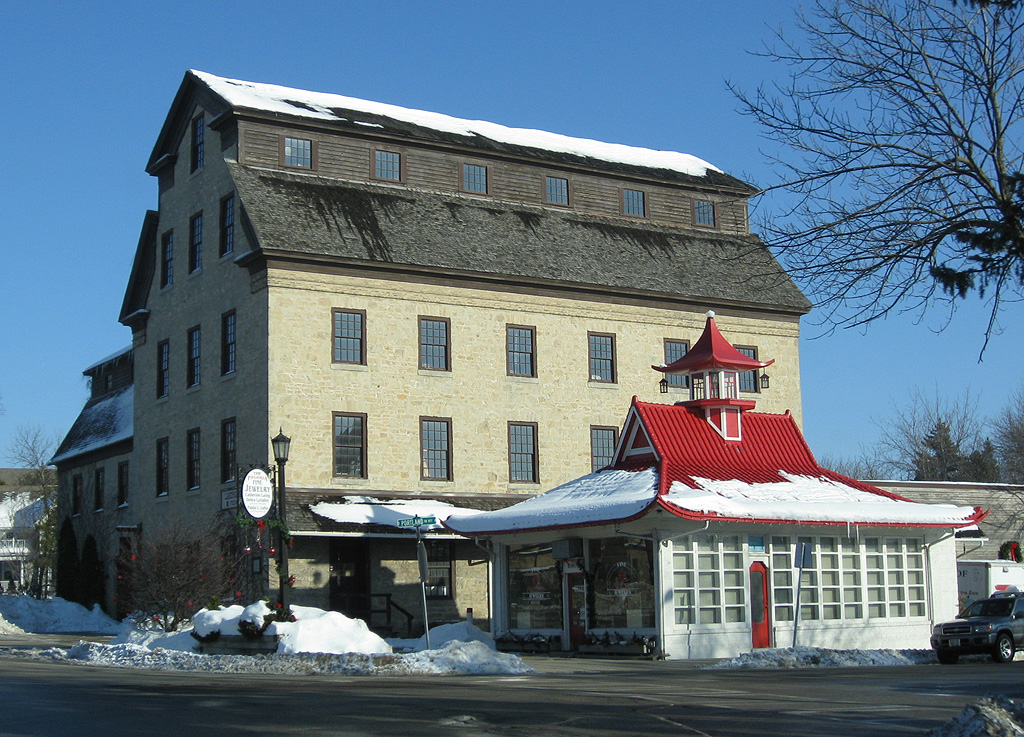
Cedarburg Mill

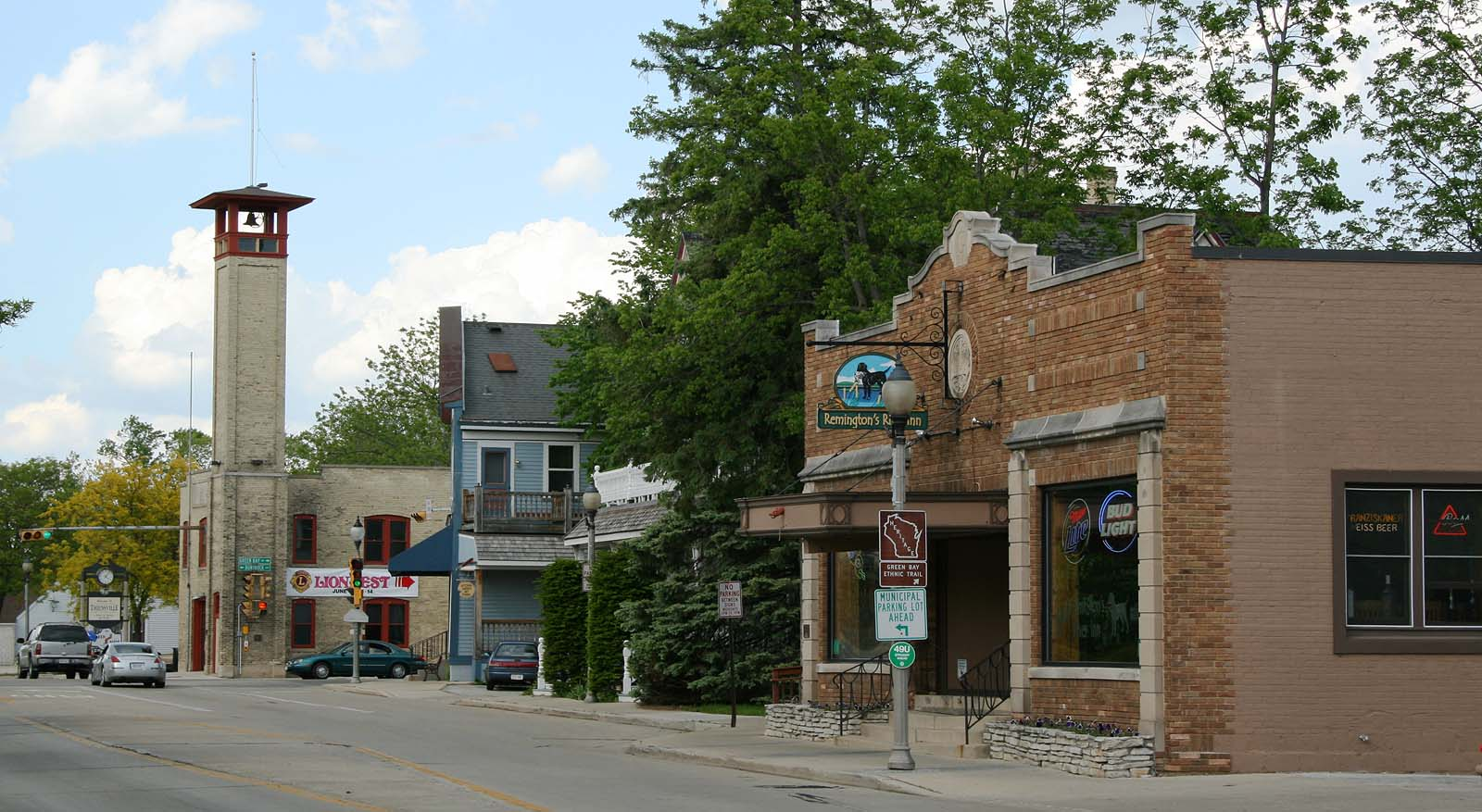
Main Street Historic District (Thiensville, Wisconsin)

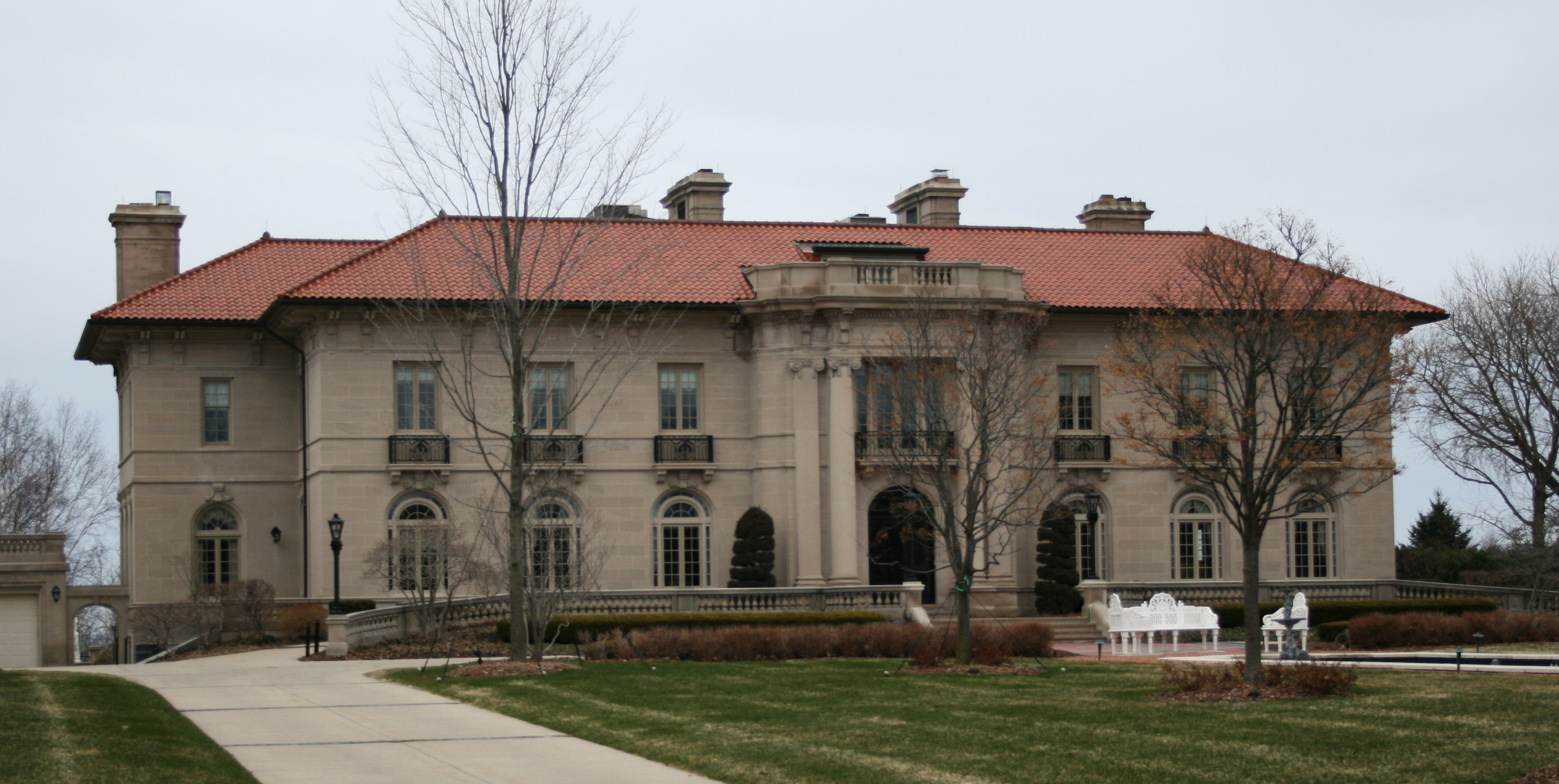
Herman Uihlein House in Whitefish Bay

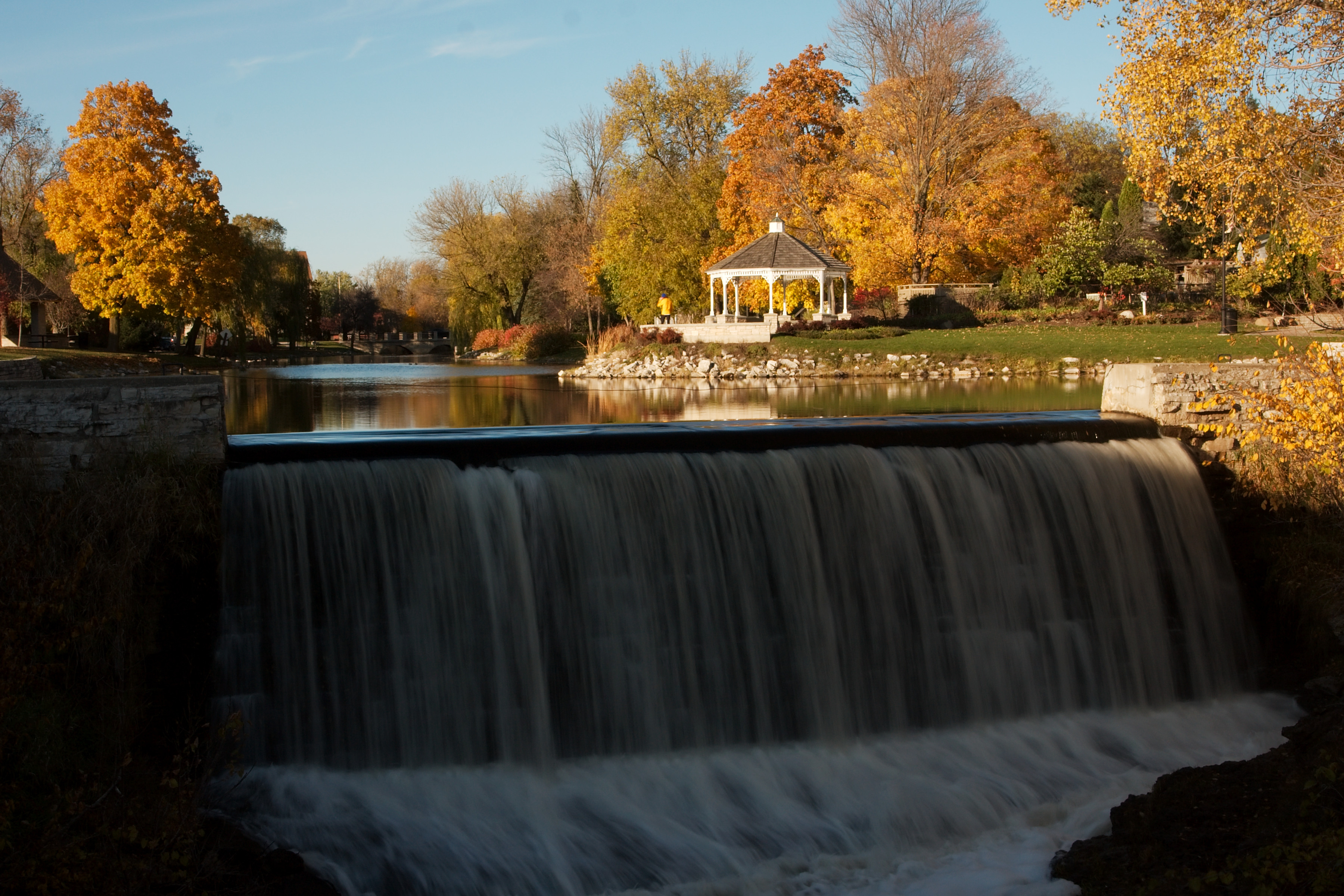
Mill Pond Park in Menomonee Falls

== Past senators ==
Note: the boundaries of districts have changed repeatedly over history. Previous politicians of a specific numbered district have represented a completely different geographic area, due to redistricting.

The Eighth District as originally created consisted of Green County. It was represented by:

| Senator | Party | Notes | Session | Years | District Definition |
|---|---|---|---|---|---|
| District created | | | | 1848 | Green County |
| Elisha T. Gardner | Dem. | | 1st | 1848 | Green County |
| Elisha T. Gardner | Dem. | | 2nd | 1849 | Green County |
| William Rittenhouse | Dem. | | 3rd | 1850 | Green County |
| William Rittenhouse | Dem. | | 4th | 1851 | Green County |
| Thomas Bowen | Dem. | Redistricted to the 24th district. | 5th | 1852 | Green County |
| John Sharpstein | Dem. | | 6th | 1853 | 1852–1855 1856–1860 1861–1865 1866–1870; Kenosha County |
| Levi Grant | Dem. | | 7th | 1854 | 1852–1855 1856–1860 1861–1865 1866–1870; Kenosha County |
| Francis Paddock | Dem. | | 8th | 1855 | 1852–1855 1856–1860 1861–1865 1866–1870; Kenosha County |
| C. Latham Sholes | Rep. | | 9th | 1856 | 1852–1855 1856–1860 1861–1865 1866–1870; Kenosha County |
| C. Latham Sholes | Rep. | | 10th | 1857 | 1852–1855 1856–1860 1861–1865 1866–1870; Kenosha County |
| Samuel R. McClellan | Rep. | | 11th | 1858 | 1852–1855 1856–1860 1861–1865 1866–1870; Kenosha County |
| Samuel R. McClellan | Rep. | | 12th | 1859 | 1852–1855 1856–1860 1861–1865 1866–1870; Kenosha County |
| George Bennett | Rep. | | 13th | 1860 | 1852–1855 1856–1860 1861–1865 1866–1870; Kenosha County |
| George Bennett | Rep. | | 14th | 1861 | 1852–1855 1856–1860 1861–1865 1866–1870; Kenosha County |
| Hermon Thorp | Rep. | | 15th | 1862 | 1852–1855 1856–1860 1861–1865 1866–1870; Kenosha County |
| Hermon Thorp | Rep. | | 16th | 1863 | 1852–1855 1856–1860 1861–1865 1866–1870; Kenosha County |
| Anthony Van Wyck | Natl. Union | | 17th | 1864 | 1852–1855 1856–1860 1861–1865 1866–1870; Kenosha County |
| Anthony Van Wyck | Natl. Union | | 18th | 1865 | 1852–1855 1856–1860 1861–1865 1866–1870; Kenosha County |
| Charles Sholes | Natl. Union | | 19th | 1866 | 1852–1855 1856–1860 1861–1865 1866–1870; Kenosha County |
| Charles Sholes | Natl. Union | | 20th | 1867 | 1852–1855 1856–1860 1861–1865 1866–1870; Kenosha County |
| Anthony Van Wyck | Rep. | | 21st | 1868 | 1852–1855 1856–1860 1861–1865 1866–1870; Kenosha County |
| Anthony Van Wyck | Rep. | | 22nd | 1869 | 1852–1855 1856–1860 1861–1865 1866–1870; Kenosha County |
| Milton Pettit | Rep. | Elected Lieutenant Governor in 1871. | 23rd | 1870 | 1852–1855 1856–1860 1861–1865 1866–1870; Kenosha County |
| Milton Pettit | Rep. | Elected Lieutenant Governor in 1871. | 24th | 1871 | 1852–1855 1856–1860 1861–1865 1866–1870; Kenosha County |
| Samuel Pratt | Rep. | | 25th | 1872 | 1871–1875 1876–1881 1882–1887 1888–1891; Kenosha and Walworth counties |
| Samuel Pratt | Rep. | | 26th | 1873 | 1871–1875 1876–1881 1882–1887 1888–1891; Kenosha and Walworth counties |
| Thompson Weeks | Rep. | | 27th | 1874 | 1871–1875 1876–1881 1882–1887 1888–1891; Kenosha and Walworth counties |
| Thompson Weeks | Rep. | | 28th | 1875 | 1871–1875 1876–1881 1882–1887 1888–1891; Kenosha and Walworth counties |
| Asahel Farr | Rep. | | 29th | 1876 | 1871–1875 1876–1881 1882–1887 1888–1891; Kenosha and Walworth counties |
| Asahel Farr | Rep. | | 30th | 1877 | 1871–1875 1876–1881 1882–1887 1888–1891; Kenosha and Walworth counties |
| Benoni Reynolds | Rep. | | 31st | 1878 | 1871–1875 1876–1881 1882–1887 1888–1891; Kenosha and Walworth counties |
| Benoni Reynolds | Rep. | | 32nd | 1879 | 1871–1875 1876–1881 1882–1887 1888–1891; Kenosha and Walworth counties |
| Joseph V. Quarles | Rep. | | 33rd | 1880 | 1871–1875 1876–1881 1882–1887 1888–1891; Kenosha and Walworth counties |
| Joseph V. Quarles | Rep. | | 34th | 1881 | 1871–1875 1876–1881 1882–1887 1888–1891; Kenosha and Walworth counties |
| Charles Palmetier | Rep. | | 35th | 1882 | 1871–1875 1876–1881 1882–1887 1888–1891; Kenosha and Walworth counties |
| Charles Palmetier | Rep. | | 36th | 1883–1884 | 1871–1875 1876–1881 1882–1887 1888–1891; Kenosha and Walworth counties |
| Walter Maxwell | Rep. | | 37th | 1885–1886 | 1871–1875 1876–1881 1882–1887 1888–1891; Kenosha and Walworth counties |
| Walter Maxwell | Rep. | | 38th | 1887–1888 | 1871–1875 1876–1881 1882–1887 1888–1891; Kenosha and Walworth counties |
| James C. Reynolds | Rep. | | 39th | 1889–1890 | 1871–1875 1876–1881 1882–1887 1888–1891; Kenosha and Walworth counties |
| James C. Reynolds | Rep. | | 40th | 1891–1892 | 1871–1875 1876–1881 1882–1887 1888–1891; Kenosha and Walworth counties |
| Michał Kruszka | Dem. | | 41st | 1893–1894 | Southern Milwaukee County: Town of Franklin; Town of Greenfield; Town of Lake; Town of Oak Creek; Wards 11, 14, 17, city of Milwaukee |
| Michał Kruszka | Dem. | | 42nd | 1895–1896 | Southern Milwaukee County: Town of Franklin; Town of Greenfield; Town of Lake; Town of Oak Creek; Wards 11, 14, 17, city of Milwaukee |
| Julius Edward Roehr | Rep. | | 43rd | 1897–1898 | Central Milwaukee County: Wards 5, 8, 11, 12, city of Milwaukee |
| Julius Edward Roehr | Rep. | | 44th | 1899–1900 | Central Milwaukee County: Wards 5, 8, 11, 12, city of Milwaukee |
| Julius Edward Roehr | Rep. | | 45th | 1901–1902 | Central Milwaukee County: Wards 5, 8, 11, 12, city of Milwaukee |
| Julius Edward Roehr | Rep. | | 46th | 1903–1904 | Central Milwaukee County: Wards 5, 8, 11, 12, 23, city of Milwaukee |
| Julius Edward Roehr | Rep. | | 47th | 1905–1906 | Central Milwaukee County: Wards 5, 8, 11, 12, 23, city of Milwaukee |
| Julius Edward Roehr | Rep. | | 48th | 1907–1908 | Central Milwaukee County: Wards 5, 8, 11, 12, 23, city of Milwaukee |
| John C. Kleczka | Rep. | | 49th | 1909–1910 | Central Milwaukee County: Wards 5, 8, 11, 12, 23, city of Milwaukee |
| John C. Kleczka | Rep. | | 50th | 1911–1912 | Central Milwaukee County: Wards 5, 8, 11, 12, 23, city of Milwaukee |
| Alexander E. Martin | Rep. | | 51st | 1913–1914 | Central Milwaukee County: Wards 5, 8, 11, 12, 23, city of Milwaukee |
| Alexander E. Martin | Rep. | | 52nd | 1915–1916 | Central Milwaukee County: Wards 5, 8, 11, 12, 23, city of Milwaukee |
| Frank Raguse | Soc. | Expelled in 1917. | 53rd | 1917–1918 | Central Milwaukee County: Wards 5, 8, 11, 12, 23, city of Milwaukee |
| Louis Fons | Rep. | Won 1918 special election. | 53rd | 1917–1918 | Central Milwaukee County: Wards 5, 8, 11, 12, 23, city of Milwaukee |
| Louis Fons | Rep. | Won 1918 special election. | 54th | 1919–1920 | Central Milwaukee County: Wards 5, 8, 11, 12, 23, city of Milwaukee |
| George Czerwinski | Rep. | | 55th | 1921–1922 | Central Milwaukee County: Wards 5, 8, 11, 12, 23, city of Milwaukee |
| George Czerwinski | Rep. | | 56th | 1923–1924 | Western Milwaukee County: Town of Franklin; Town of Granville; Town of Greenfield; Town of Wauwatosa; Village of West Milwaukee; City of North Milwaukee; City of Wauwatosa; City of West Allis; Wards 16, 23, city of Milwaukee |
| Harry Daggett | Rep. | | 57th | 1925–1926 | Western Milwaukee County: Town of Franklin; Town of Granville; Town of Greenfield; Town of Wauwatosa; Village of West Milwaukee; City of North Milwaukee; City of Wauwatosa; City of West Allis; Wards 16, 23, city of Milwaukee |
| Harry Daggett | Rep. | | 58th | 1927–1928 | Western Milwaukee County: Town of Franklin; Town of Granville; Town of Greenfield; Town of Wauwatosa; Village of West Milwaukee; City of North Milwaukee; City of Wauwatosa; City of West Allis; Wards 16, 23, city of Milwaukee |
| Harry Daggett | Rep. | | 59th | 1929–1930 | Western Milwaukee County: Town of Franklin; Town of Granville; Town of Greenfield; Town of Wauwatosa; Village of West Milwaukee; City of North Milwaukee; City of Wauwatosa; City of West Allis; Wards 16, 23, city of Milwaukee |
| Harry Daggett | Rep. | | 60th | 1931–1932 | Western Milwaukee County: Town of Franklin; Town of Granville; Town of Greenfield; Town of Wauwatosa; Village of West Milwaukee; City of North Milwaukee; City of Wauwatosa; City of West Allis; Wards 16, 23, city of Milwaukee |
| William Shenners Jr. | Dem. | | 61st | 1933–1934 | Western Milwaukee County: Town of Franklin; Town of Granville; Town of Greenfield; Town of Wauwatosa; Village of Greendale; Village of West Milwaukee; City of Wauwatosa; City of West Allis; Wards 16, 23, city of Milwaukee |
| William Shenners Jr. | Dem. | | 62nd | 1935–1936 | Western Milwaukee County: Town of Franklin; Town of Granville; Town of Greenfield; Town of Wauwatosa; Village of Greendale; Village of West Milwaukee; City of Wauwatosa; City of West Allis; Wards 16, 23, city of Milwaukee |
| Allen Busby | Prog. | | 63rd | 1937–1938 | Western Milwaukee County: Town of Franklin; Town of Granville; Town of Greenfield; Town of Wauwatosa; Village of Greendale; Village of West Milwaukee; City of Wauwatosa; City of West Allis; Wards 16, 23, city of Milwaukee |
| Allen Busby | Prog. | | 64th | 1939–1940 | Western Milwaukee County: Town of Franklin; Town of Granville; Town of Greenfield; Town of Wauwatosa; Village of Greendale; Village of West Milwaukee; City of Wauwatosa; City of West Allis; Wards 16, 23, city of Milwaukee |
| John W. Byrnes | Rep. | | 65th | 1941–1942 | Western Milwaukee County: Town of Franklin; Town of Granville; Town of Greenfield; Town of Wauwatosa; Village of Greendale; Village of West Milwaukee; City of Wauwatosa; City of West Allis; Wards 16, 23, city of Milwaukee |
| John W. Byrnes | Rep. | | 66th | 1943–1944 | Western Milwaukee County: Town of Franklin; Town of Granville; Town of Greenfield; Town of Wauwatosa; Village of Greendale; Village of West Milwaukee; City of Wauwatosa; City of West Allis; Wards 16, 23, city of Milwaukee |
| John W. Byrnes | Rep. | | 67th | 1945–1946 | Western Milwaukee County: Town of Franklin; Town of Granville; Town of Greenfield; Town of Wauwatosa; Village of Greendale; Village of West Milwaukee; City of Wauwatosa; City of West Allis; Wards 16, 23, city of Milwaukee |
| John W. Byrnes | Rep. | | 68th | 1947–1948 | Western Milwaukee County: Town of Franklin; Town of Granville; Town of Greenfield; Town of Wauwatosa; Village of Greendale; Village of West Milwaukee; City of Wauwatosa; City of West Allis; Wards 16, 23, city of Milwaukee |
| John W. Byrnes | Rep. | | 69th | 1949–1950 | Western Milwaukee County: Town of Franklin; Town of Granville; Town of Greenfield; Town of Wauwatosa; Village of Greendale; Village of West Milwaukee; City of Wauwatosa; City of West Allis; Wards 16, 23, city of Milwaukee |
| John W. Byrnes | Rep. | | 70th | 1951–1952 | Western Milwaukee County: Town of Franklin; Town of Granville; Town of Greenfield; Town of Wauwatosa; Village of Greendale; Village of West Milwaukee; City of Wauwatosa; City of West Allis; Wards 16, 23, city of Milwaukee |
| John W. Byrnes | Rep. | | 71st | 1953–1954 | Western Milwaukee County: Town of Franklin; Town of Granville; Town of Greenfield; Town of Wauwatosa; Village of Greendale; Village of West Milwaukee; City of Wauwatosa; City of West Allis; Wards 16, 23, city of Milwaukee |
| John W. Byrnes | Rep. | | 72nd | 1955–1956 | Western Milwaukee County: Town of Wauwatosa; Village of West Milwaukee; City of Wauwatosa; City of West Allis |
| John W. Byrnes | Rep. | | 73rd | 1957–1958 | Western Milwaukee County: Town of Wauwatosa; Village of West Milwaukee; City of Wauwatosa; City of West Allis |
| John W. Byrnes | Rep. | | 74th | 1959–1960 | Western Milwaukee County: Town of Wauwatosa; Village of West Milwaukee; City of Wauwatosa; City of West Allis |
| John W. Byrnes | Rep. | | 75th | 1961–1962 | Western Milwaukee County: Town of Wauwatosa; Village of West Milwaukee; City of Wauwatosa; City of West Allis |
| John W. Byrnes | Rep. | | 76th | 1963–1964 | Western Milwaukee County: Town of Wauwatosa; Village of West Milwaukee; City of Wauwatosa; City of West Allis |
| John W. Byrnes | Rep. | | 77th | 1965–1966 | Western Milwaukee County: Village of West Milwaukee; City of Wauwatosa; City of West Allis |
| John W. Byrnes | Rep. | | 78th | 1967–1968 | Western Milwaukee County: Village of West Milwaukee; City of Wauwatosa; City of West Allis |
| John W. Byrnes | Rep. | | 79th | 1969–1970 | Western Milwaukee County: Village of West Milwaukee; City of Wauwatosa; City of West Allis |
| John W. Byrnes | Rep. | | 80th | 1971–1972 | Western Milwaukee County: Village of West Milwaukee; City of Wauwatosa; City of West Allis |
| James Flynn | Dem. | Won 1972 election. Re-elected 1976, 1980. Elected to Lieutenant Governor in 1982. | 81st | 1973–1974 | Western Milwaukee County: Village of West Milwaukee; City of Wauwatosa; Part of the village of Hales Corners; Part of the city of Greenfield; Part of the city of West Allis |
| James Flynn | Dem. | Won 1972 election. Re-elected 1976, 1980. Elected to Lieutenant Governor in 1982. | 82nd | 1975–1976 | Western Milwaukee County: Village of West Milwaukee; City of Wauwatosa; Part of the village of Hales Corners; Part of the city of Greenfield; Part of the city of West Allis |
| James Flynn | Dem. | Won 1972 election. Re-elected 1976, 1980. Elected to Lieutenant Governor in 1982. | 83rd | 1977–1978 | Western Milwaukee County: Village of West Milwaukee; City of Wauwatosa; Part of the village of Hales Corners; Part of the city of Greenfield; Part of the city of West Allis |
| James Flynn | Dem. | Won 1972 election. Re-elected 1976, 1980. Elected to Lieutenant Governor in 1982. | 84th | 1979–1980 | Western Milwaukee County: Village of West Milwaukee; City of Wauwatosa; Part of the village of Hales Corners; Part of the city of Greenfield; Part of the city of West Allis |
| James Flynn | Dem. | Won 1972 election. Re-elected 1976, 1980. Elected to Lieutenant Governor in 1982. | 85th | 1981–1982 | Western Milwaukee County: Village of West Milwaukee; City of Wauwatosa; Part of the village of Hales Corners; Part of the city of Greenfield; Part of the city of West Allis |
| Joseph Czarnezki | Dem. | Won 1983 special election. Re-elected 1984, 1988. Did not seek re-election in 1992. | 86th | 1983–1984 | Western Milwaukee County: City of Greenfield; City of West Milwaukee; Wards 7, 9, village of Greendale; Wards 1-15, 18-34, city of West Allis; Wards 157, 159-162, 200-204, 207-220, city of Milwaukee |
| Joseph Czarnezki | Dem. | Won 1983 special election. Re-elected 1984, 1988. Did not seek re-election in 1992. | 87th | 1985–1986 | Western Milwaukee County: City of Greenfield; City of West Milwaukee; Wards 7, 9, village of Greendale; Wards 1-15, 18-34, city of West Allis; Wards 157, 159-162, 200-204, 207-220, city of Milwaukee |
| Joseph Czarnezki | Dem. | Won 1983 special election. Re-elected 1984, 1988. Did not seek re-election in 1992. | 88th | 1987–1988 | Western Milwaukee County: City of Greenfield; City of West Milwaukee; Wards 7, 9, village of Greendale; Wards 1-15, 18-34, city of West Allis; Wards 157, 159-162, 200-204, 207-220, city of Milwaukee |
| Joseph Czarnezki | Dem. | Won 1983 special election. Re-elected 1984, 1988. Did not seek re-election in 1992. | 89th | 1989–1990 | Western Milwaukee County: City of Greenfield; City of West Milwaukee; Wards 7, 9, village of Greendale; Wards 1-15, 18-34, city of West Allis; Wards 157, 159-162, 200-204, 207-220, city of Milwaukee |
| Joseph Czarnezki | Dem. | Won 1983 special election. Re-elected 1984, 1988. Did not seek re-election in 1992. | 90th | 1991–1992 | Western Milwaukee County: City of Greenfield; City of West Milwaukee; Wards 7, 9, village of Greendale; Wards 1-15, 18-34, city of West Allis; Wards 157, 159-162, 200-204, 207-220, city of Milwaukee |
| Alberta Darling | Rep. | Won 1992 election. Re-elected 1996, 2000, 2004, 2008. Survived 2011 recall. Re-elected 2012, 2016, 2020. Resigned Dec. 2022 | 91st | 1993–1994 | Northern Milwaukee County, southwest Ozaukee County, southeast Washington County, & northeast Waukesha County: Milwaukee County; Village of Bayside; Village of Brown Deer; Village of Fox Point; Village of River Hills; Village of Whitefish Bay; Wards 3-6, 8-12, village of Glendale; Wards 42, 44, 47, 48, 155, 156, 158, 272-275, 277-279, 282, city of Milwaukee; Wards 1-11, village of Shorewood; Ozaukee County; Village of Bayside; Wards 11, 13, 14, 15, city of Mequon; Washington County; Town of Germantown; Village of Germantown; Wards 6, 7, town of Polk; Wards 1-4, 6-15, town of Richfield; Waukesha County; Wards 1, 2, village of Butler; Wards 1-23, village of Menomenee Falls |
| Alberta Darling | Rep. | Won 1992 election. Re-elected 1996, 2000, 2004, 2008. Survived 2011 recall. Re-elected 2012, 2016, 2020. Resigned Dec. 2022 | 92nd | 1995–1996 | |
| Alberta Darling | Rep. | Won 1992 election. Re-elected 1996, 2000, 2004, 2008. Survived 2011 recall. Re-elected 2012, 2016, 2020. Resigned Dec. 2022 | 93rd | 1997–1998 | |
| Alberta Darling | Rep. | Won 1992 election. Re-elected 1996, 2000, 2004, 2008. Survived 2011 recall. Re-elected 2012, 2016, 2020. Resigned Dec. 2022 | 94th | 1999–2000 | |
| Alberta Darling | Rep. | Won 1992 election. Re-elected 1996, 2000, 2004, 2008. Survived 2011 recall. Re-elected 2012, 2016, 2020. Resigned Dec. 2022 | 95th | 2001–2002 | |
| Alberta Darling | Rep. | Won 1992 election. Re-elected 1996, 2000, 2004, 2008. Survived 2011 recall. Re-elected 2012, 2016, 2020. Resigned Dec. 2022 | 96th | 2003–2004 | Northern Milwaukee County, southern Ozaukee County, southeast Washington County, & northeast Waukesha County: Milwaukee County; Village of Bayside; Village of Brown Deer; Village of Fox Point; Village of River Hills; Village of Shorewood; Village of Whitefish Bay; Wards 2-5, 7-10, city of Glendale; Wards 38, 40, 147, 150, 258-263, 265, city of Milwaukee; Ozaukee County; Village of Bayside; Village of Thiensville; Wards 1, 3-21, city of Mequon; Washington County; Town of Germantown; Village of Germantown; Wards 6-8, 11-13, town of Richfield; Ward 262, city of Milwaukee; Waukesha County; Village of Butler; Wards 1-17, 19-23, 28, 29, village of Menomenee Falls |
| Alberta Darling | Rep. | Won 1992 election. Re-elected 1996, 2000, 2004, 2008. Survived 2011 recall. Re-elected 2012, 2016, 2020. Resigned Dec. 2022 | 97th | 2005–2006 | |
| Alberta Darling | Rep. | Won 1992 election. Re-elected 1996, 2000, 2004, 2008. Survived 2011 recall. Re-elected 2012, 2016, 2020. Resigned Dec. 2022 | 98th | 2007–2008 | |
| Alberta Darling | Rep. | Won 1992 election. Re-elected 1996, 2000, 2004, 2008. Survived 2011 recall. Re-elected 2012, 2016, 2020. Resigned Dec. 2022 | 99th | 2009–2010 | |
| Alberta Darling | Rep. | Won 1992 election. Re-elected 1996, 2000, 2004, 2008. Survived 2011 recall. Re-elected 2012, 2016, 2020. Resigned Dec. 2022 | 100th | 2011–2012 | |
| Alberta Darling | Rep. | Won 1992 election. Re-elected 1996, 2000, 2004, 2008. Survived 2011 recall. Re-elected 2012, 2016, 2020. Resigned Dec. 2022 | 101st | 2013–2014 | Northeast Milwaukee County, southeast Ozaukee County, southern Washington County, & northeast Waukesha County: Assembly Districts 22, 23, 24 |
| Alberta Darling | Rep. | Won 1992 election. Re-elected 1996, 2000, 2004, 2008. Survived 2011 recall. Re-elected 2012, 2016, 2020. Resigned Dec. 2022 | 102nd | 2015–2016 | Northeast Milwaukee County, southeast Ozaukee County, southern Washington County, & northeast Waukesha County: Assembly Districts 22, 23, 24 |
| Alberta Darling | Rep. | Won 1992 election. Re-elected 1996, 2000, 2004, 2008. Survived 2011 recall. Re-elected 2012, 2016, 2020. Resigned Dec. 2022 | 103rd | 2017–2018 | Northeast Milwaukee County, southeast Ozaukee County, southern Washington County, & northeast Waukesha County: Assembly Districts 22, 23, 24 |
| Alberta Darling | Rep. | Won 1992 election. Re-elected 1996, 2000, 2004, 2008. Survived 2011 recall. Re-elected 2012, 2016, 2020. Resigned Dec. 2022 | 104th | 2019–2020 | Northeast Milwaukee County, southeast Ozaukee County, southern Washington County, & northeast Waukesha County: Assembly Districts 22, 23, 24 |
| Alberta Darling | Rep. | Won 1992 election. Re-elected 1996, 2000, 2004, 2008. Survived 2011 recall. Re-elected 2012, 2016, 2020. Resigned Dec. 2022 | 105th | 2021–2022 | Northeast Milwaukee County, southeast Ozaukee County, southern Washington County, & northeast Waukesha County: Assembly Districts 22, 23, 24 |
| --Vacant-- | | | 106th | 2023–2024 | Northeast Milwaukee County, Southern Ozaukee County, Southern Washington County, Northeast Waukesha County |
| Dan Knodl | Rep. | Won 2023 special election. | 106th | 2023–2024 | Northeast Milwaukee County, Southern Ozaukee County, Southern Washington County, Northeast Waukesha County |
| Jodi Habush Sinykin | Dem. | Elected 2024. | 107th | 2025–2026 | |

== See also ==
- Administrative divisions of Wisconsin
