= Julius Jensen =

American politician

Julius Jensen was a Danish-born American member of the Wisconsin State Assembly.

== Biography ==
Jensen was born on January 10, 1872, in Denmark. He emigrated to Milwaukee, Wisconsin, in 1883.

== Career ==
Jensen was elected to the Assembly in 1920 and 1924. Previously, he was a member of the Milwaukee County, Wisconsin Republican Committee.
