= George Czerwinski =

American politician

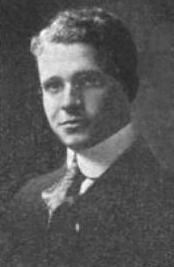

Member of the Wisconsin State Senate
- In office 1921–1924
- Constituency: 8th district

Member of the Wisconsin State Assembly
- In office 1919

Personal details
- Born: George Francis Czerwinski; September 19, 1890 Milwaukee, Wisconsin, US
- Died: December 4, 1988 (aged 98) Milwaukee, Wisconsin, US
- Party: Republican

George Francis Czerwinski (September 19, 1890 – December 4, 1988), later Sherwin, was an American politician who was a member of the Wisconsin State Assembly and the Wisconsin State Senate.

== Biography ==
Czerwinski was born in Milwaukee, Wisconsin. His father, a salesman, was a Polish emigrant. He became a contractor for the building of city streets. He died in 1988 in Milwaukee.

== Political career ==
Czerwinski represented the 8th district of the Senate from 1921 to 1924. Previously, he was elected to the Assembly in 1918. He was a Republican.
