= List of people from Milwaukee =

This is a list of Milwaukeeans, notable citizens of Milwaukee, Wisconsin.

== Born and raised in Milwaukee ==
The following people were born and spent a significant number of their growing-up years in Milwaukee.

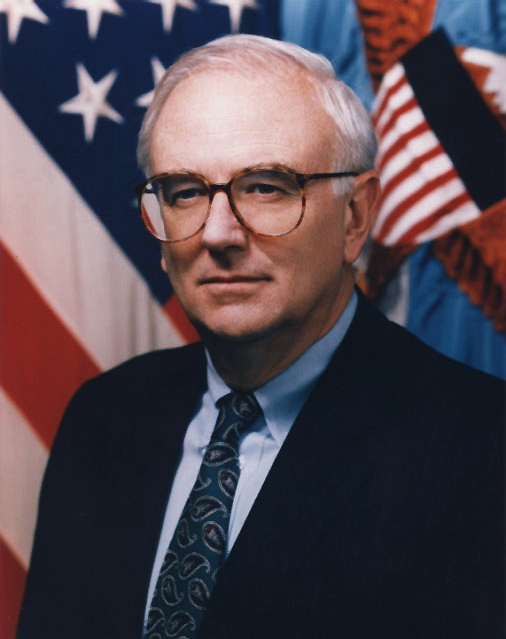
Les Aspin

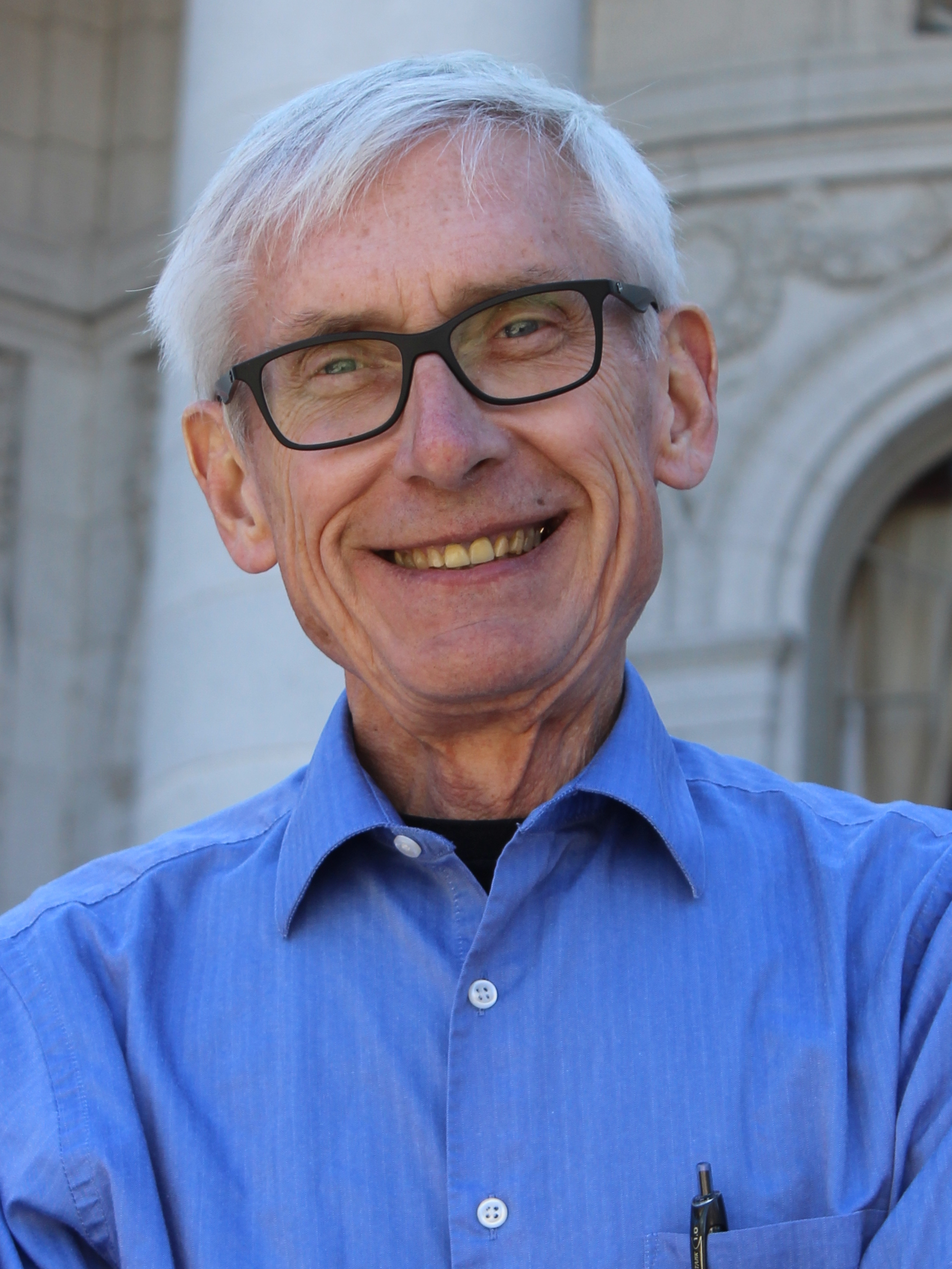
Tony Evers

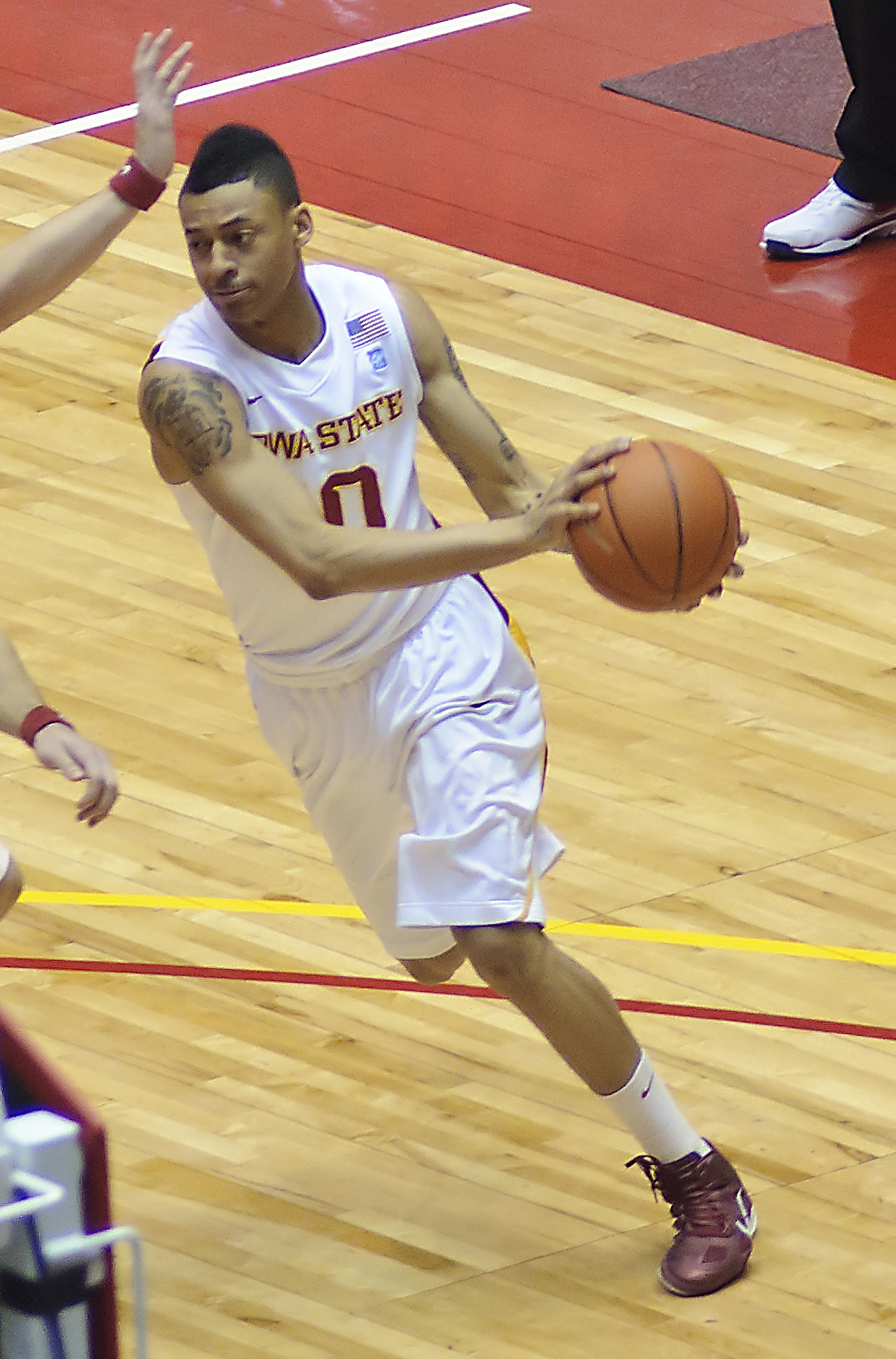
Diante Garrett

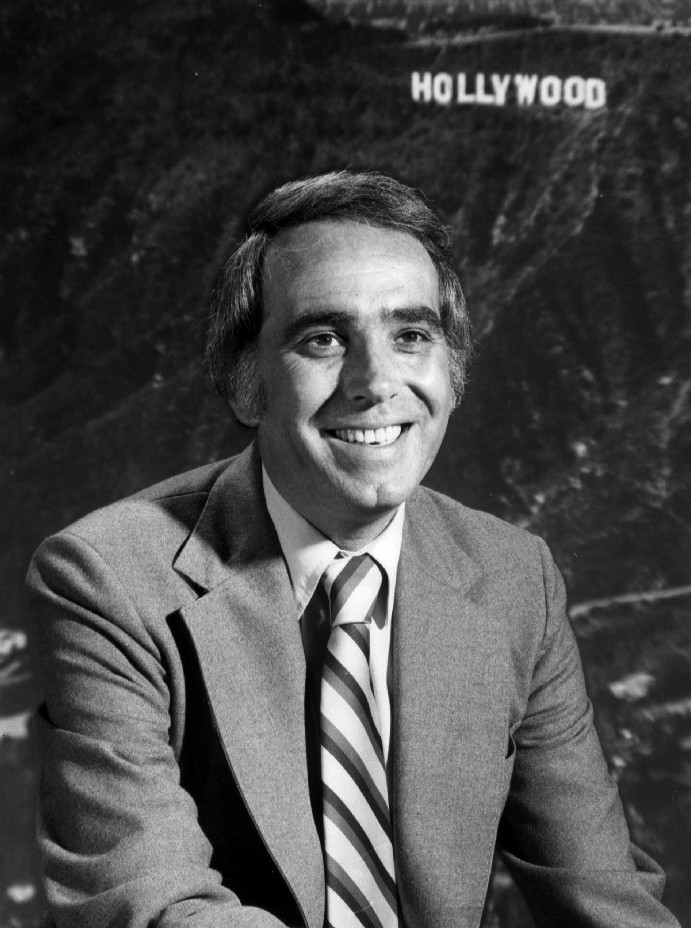
Tom Snyder

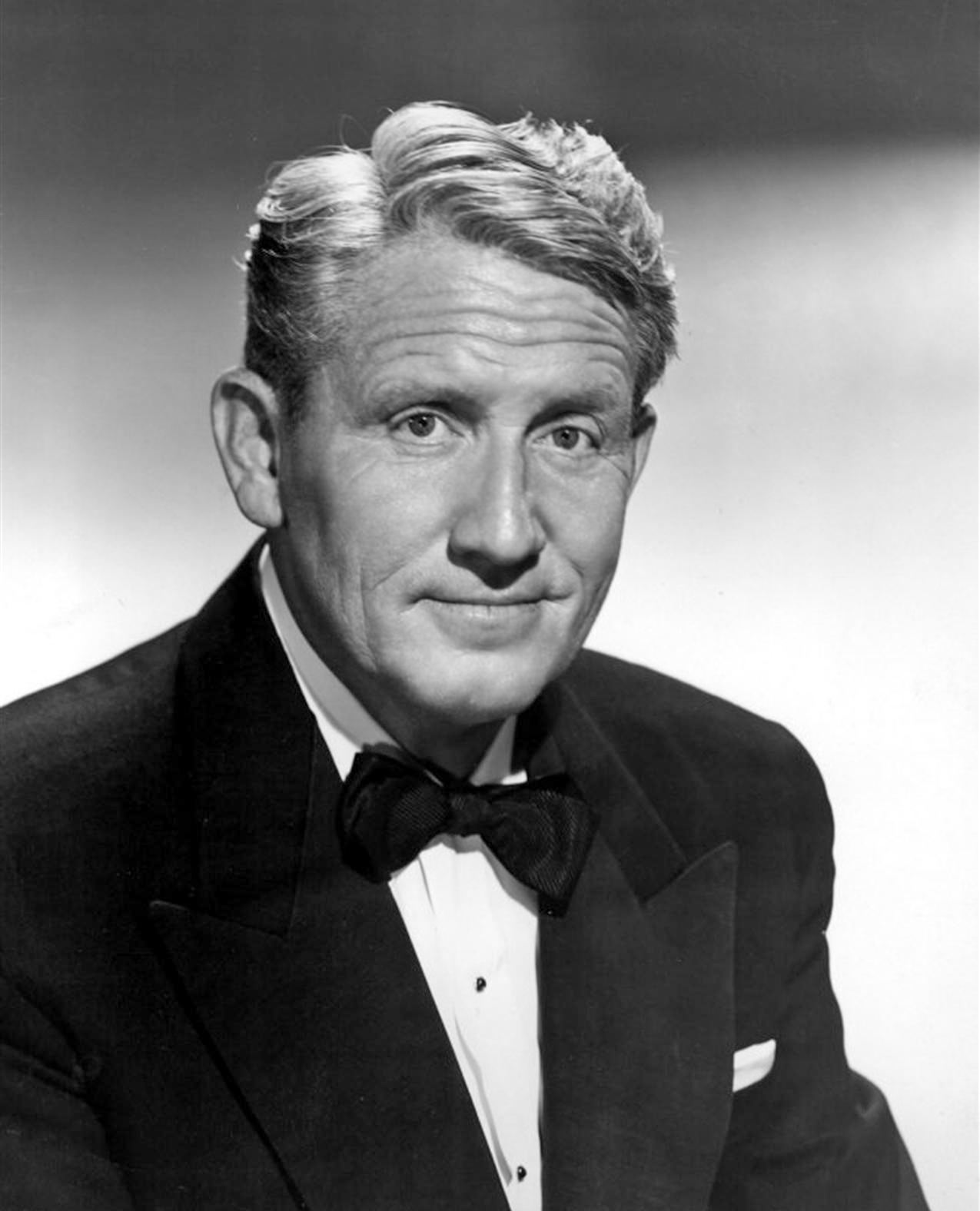
Spencer Tracy

- George A. Abert, member of the Wisconsin State Assembly and the Wisconsin State Senate
- Jim Abrahams, director and screenwriter
- David Adler, architect who designed over 200 estates during the "Great American Fashion era"
- Amy Aiken, winemaker
- Marc Alaimo, actor who played many Star Trek characters
- Tim Alioto, soccer player
- Tom Alioto, soccer player
- Carl Allen, musician
- Vivian Anderson, All-American Girls Professional Baseball League player (Milwaukee Chicks)
- Casey Andringa, freestyle skier
- Joseph Anthony, playwright, actor, and director
- Antler, poet
- Lynne Arriale, musician; professor
- Les Aspin, U.S. secretary of defense
- Steve Avery, NFL player for the Houston Oilers, Green Bay Packers, and the Pittsburgh Steelers
- Mitchell Ayres, bandleader for Perry Como and The Hollywood Palace
- David Backes, author; professor
- Gerhard A. Bading, U.S. diplomat
- Frank Ellis Bamford, U.S. military office
- J. C. Banks, soccer player
- Jimmy Banks, soccer player
- Ben Bard, actor
- Shorty Barr, NFL player and head coach
- Dede Barry, Olympic medalist
- Tommy Bartlett, entertainment mogul and showman; created Tommy Bartlett's Thrill Show in Wisconsin Dells, Wisconsin
- Louis Bashell, Slovenian-style polka musician
- William Bast, screenwriter
- James Batemon III (born 1997), basketball player in the National Basketball League (Australia)
- John C. Becher, actor
- Robert J. Beck, professor
- Travis Beckum, NFL player for New York Giants
- Chuck Belin, NFL player
- Harry Bell, Medal of Honor recipient
- Lawrencia "Bambi" Bembenek, police officer convicted of murdering husband's ex-wife
- Eric Benet, R&B singer; was married to Halle Berry
- David Benke, president of Atlantic District of Lutheran Church–Missouri Synod
- Mark W. Bennett, U.S. district court judge in Iowa
- Michael Bennett, NFL player
- James Benning, filmmaker
- Lamont Bentley, actor; best known for his role as Hakeem Campbell on television series Moesha
- Paris Berelc, actress
- Scott Bergold, NFL player
- George Berry, NFL player
- Abner Biberman, actor and director
- Dick Bilda, NFL player
- Roman R. Blenski, Wisconsin state senator
- Joseph Colt Bloodgood, physician
- Wheeler Peckham Bloodgood, lawyer
- Vander Blue, basketball player
- Adam Bob, NFL player
- Otto Bock, justice of Colorado Supreme Court
- Bill Boedeker, NFL player for the Chicago Rockets, Cleveland Browns, Green Bay Packers, and the Philadelphia Eagles
- Frank Bohlmann, NFL player
- Peter Bonerz, actor
- Mark Borchardt, independent filmmaker; best known as subject of American Movie
- Larry Borenstein, art and music promoter
- Bob Botz, MLB player
- Timmy Bowers, professional basketball player, 2006 Israeli Basketball Premier League MVP
- David Braden, NFL player
- Gil Brandt, executive of Dallas Cowboys
- John W. Breen, NFL general manager
- Arthur Herman Bremer, George Wallace shooter
- Cindy Bremser, Olympic athlete; Pan American Games medalist
- Terry Brennan, head coach of Notre Dame Fighting Irish football team
- Jeff Bridich, MLB general manager
- Pamela Britton, actress
- Mandy Brooks, MLB player
- Fred Brown, NBA player, First Team All American at the University of Iowa
- Judi Brown, Olympic medalist; Pan American Games gold medalist
- William George Bruce, author, historian, publisher, civic leader for Milwaukee Auditorium and Port of Milwaukee
- J.T. Bruett, MLB player
- George Brumder, newspaper publisher
- Fabian Bruskewitz, Roman Catholic bishop
- Felice Bryant, songwriter; member of Songwriters Hall of Fame and Country Music Hall of Fame
- Art Bues, MLB player
- Rodney Buford, NBA player
- Brian Burke, Wisconsin politician
- Charles C. Butler, chief justice of Colorado Supreme Court
- Jackie Cain, musician
- Daryl Carter, NFL player
- John M. Cavey, Wisconsin legislator and lawyer
- Paul Cebar, musician
- James Chance (James Siegfried, a/k/a James White), saxophonist, songwriter and singer, key figure in No Wave movement
- John Moses Cheney, U.S. district court judge in Florida
- Ted Cieslak, MLB player
- Alvin J. Clasen, Wisconsin state assemblyman
- John Louis Coffey, judge of U.S. Court of Appeals
- James Kelsey Cogswell, U.S. Navy admiral
- Wilbur J. Cohen, U.S. secretary of Health, Education, and Welfare
- Irv Comp, NFL player
- Michael Copps, commissioner of Federal Communications Commission
- Ray "Crash" Corrigan, actor; first celebrity featured on box of Wheaties
- Anthony Crivello, Tony Award-winning actor
- Lave Cross, MLB player for 21 years
- John Cudahy, U.S. diplomat
- Michael Cudahy, entrepreneur, grand-nephew of Michael Cudahy (industrialist)
- Richard Dickson Cudahy, judge of U.S. Court of Appeals
- Robert M. Curley, legislator and judge
- Pat Curran, NFL player
- James B. Currie, U.S. Air Force major general
- John Thomas Curtis, botanist and ecologist; Bray Curtis dissimilarity is partially named for him
- Joseph Czerwinski, Wisconsin State Assembly member
- Jeffrey Dahmer, serial killer
- DC the Don, rapper
- Randy Dean, NFL player and Olympic athlete
- Robert Dean, Olympic athlete
- Ashton Dearholt, actor
- Robert G. Dela Hunt, Wisconsin State Assembly member
- Steve de Shazer, psychotherapist who developed use of solution-focused brief therapy
- Tom Dempsey, NFL player
- Edward J. Dengel, Wisconsin state representative
- Abraham DeSomer, Medal of Honor recipient
- John R. Devitt, Wisconsin state representative
- Michael Dhuey, electrical and computer engineer; co-inventor of the Macintosh II and the iPod
- Lavern Dilweg, NFL player and U.S. representative
- John Doehring, NFL player
- Bernardine Dohrn, leader of the Weather Underground Organization
- John P. Donnelly, Wisconsin state representative
- Stephanie Dosen, musician
- Jeff Doucette, actor
- Donn F. Draeger, martial artist
- Randee Drew, professional football player
- Wally Dreyer, NFL player; coach of University of Wisconsin–Milwaukee Panthers football team
- Garrett Droppers, U.S. diplomat, president of University of South Dakota
- Ron Drzewiecki, NFL player
- Red Dunn, NFL player
- Zoe Dunning, U.S. naval commander and LGBT activist
- Will Durst, comedian
- Lawrence Eagleburger, U.S. secretary of state
- Greg Eagles, actor
- Robert Easton, actor, acting teacher
- Al Eckert, MLB player
- Bob Eckl, NFL player
- Patrick Eddie, NBA player
- Kathryn Edwards, model, reality television star on The Real Housewives of Beverly Hills
- Herbert W. Ehrgott, U.S. Air Force general
- Brent Emery, Olympic medalist
- Trevor Enders, MLB player
- Howie Epstein, rock musician, producer, and bassist for Tom Petty and the Heartbreakers
- Terence T. Evans, jurist
- Tony Evers, 46th governor of Wisconsin
- Ralph Evinrude, son of Ole Evinrude, inventor of world's first outboard motor, CEO Outdoor Marine Corp
- Thomas E. Fairchild, chief judge of the U.S. Court of Appeals
- Raleigh W. Falbe, Wisconsin state legislator
- Anton Falch, professional baseball player
- Frank Farkas, Florida state representative
- Hudson Fasching, NHL player
- Lorenzo Fayne, serial killer and rapist
- Michael Feldman, radio personality for Public Radio International
- Michael Felger, sports radio talk show host
- Gene Felker, NFL player
- Happy Felsch, MLB player
- Max Fernekes, artist
- Thomasita Fessler, painter
- Edgar Fiedler (1929–2003), economist
- Julius Fiege, Wisconsin state representative
- James E. Finnegan, attorney general of Wisconsin
- Jack Finney, science-fiction and thriller writer; his novel The Body Snatchers was basis for movie Invasion of the Body Snatchers
- Chris Foerster, NFL assistant coach
- Reginald Foster, Latinist
- Michael Foster Jr. (born 2003), basketball power forward in the Israeli Basketball Premier League
- Eduard Franz, actor
- Jacob Elias Friend, Wisconsin state legislator, businessman, lawyer
- Bruce Froemming, MLB umpire
- Todd Frohwirth, MLB player
- Fabian Gaffke, MLB player
- Max Galasinski, stonecutter, sculptor
- Chris Gardner, self-made millionaire whose bout with homelessness is portrayed in film The Pursuit of Happyness
- Diante Garrett (born 1988), basketball player for Ironi Ness Ziona of the Israeli Basketball Premier League
- Augusts F. Gearhard, deputy chief of chaplains of U.S. Air Force
- Warren Giese, head coach of South Carolina Gamecocks football team, South Carolina state senator
- Herschel Burke Gilbert, film and television composer
- Hank Gillo, NFL player and head coach
- Martin Glendon, MLB player
- Carlos Glidden, co-inventor of first practical typewriter, with Christopher Sholes and Samuel W. Soule
- Danny Gokey, American Idol contestant
- Lamar Gordon, NFL player
- Angelo F. Greco, member of Wisconsin State Assembly
- Joseph A. Greco, member of Wisconsin State Assembly
- Gregory Greiten, Roman Catholic priest
- Abraham L. Grootemaat, member of Wisconsin State Assembly
- James Groppi, Roman Catholic priest and civil rights activist
- Glenn Grothman, U.S. representative for Wisconsin
- Anthony Gruszka, member of the Wisconsin State Assembly
- Eric Gugler, architect
- Jay Guidinger, NBA player
- John Gurda, writer and historian
- Carl Haessler, political activist
- Luise Haessler, linguist
- Eric E. Hagedorn, member of the Wisconsin State Assembly
- Jeffrey Robert Haines, Roman Catholic bishop
- Jaida Essence Hall, drag queen superstar and winner of the 12th season of RuPaul's Drag Race
- Bo Hanley, NFL player and head coach
- Derrick Harden, NFL player
- Pat Harder, NFL player, member of College Football Hall of Fame
- Jason Hardtke, MLB player
- Kevin Harlan, sportscaster
- Dan Harmon, creator of the NBC series Community, and co-creator of series Rick and Morty
- Mildred Harnack, German resistance fighter during World War II, executed under orders from Adolf Hitler
- George Harper, MLB player
- Devin Harris, professional basketball player
- Jerry Harrison, keyboardist for new wave music group Talking Heads
- Kenny Harrison, world champion track and field athlete; Olympic gold medalist; Goodwill Games medalist
- Mike Hart, MLB player
- James Michael Harvey, Roman Catholic bishop
- William Frederick Hase, U.S. Army major general
- Jerome J. Hastrich, bishop of the Roman Catholic Diocese of Gallup
- Joe Hauser, MLB player
- Ned R. Healy, Los Angeles City Council member, 1943–44, member of Congress, 1945–47
- Bob Heinz, NFL player
- George Hekkers, NFL player
- Frederick Hemke, professor of saxophone at Northwestern University
- Marguerite Henry, award-winning children's author, known for books about animals
- Woody Herman, jazz singer, instrumentalist, and bandleader
- Tyler Herro, NBA player
- Keith K. Hilbig, general authority of the Church of Jesus Christ of Latter-day Saints
- Elizabeth Hirschboeck, humanitarian
- Deb Hoffmann, Winnie-the-Pooh memorabilia collector
- Alice Holz, union organizer
- Jack Hueller, NFL player
- Doris Hursley, co-creator of General Hospital and daughter of Victor L. Berger
- Andy Hurley, Fall Out Boy
- Mike Huwiler, Olympic athlete; MLS player
- Caroline Ingalls (1839–1924), born in Brookfield, mother of famed author Laura Ingalls Wilder
- Einar H. Ingman Jr., Medal of Honor recipient
- IshDARR, rapper
- Robert Jacobson, Lutheran bishop, then Roman Catholic priest
- Jeff Jagodzinski, NFL assistant coach, head coach of Boston College
- Eddie Jankowski, NFL player
- Dan Jansen, world champion speed skater; Olympic gold medalist; member of United States Olympic Hall of Fame; NHL assistant coach
- Al Jarreau, award-winning jazz singer
- Katherine Jashinski, United States Army soldier who refused orders to deploy to Afghanistan in 2006
- Salome Jens, actress, best known for portraying Female Shapeshifter on Star Trek: Deep Space Nine
- Jim Jodat, NFL player
- Harry G. John, philanthropist
- Mark Jones, NBA player
- Barbara Jordan, professional tennis player
- Elizabeth Jordan, writer, journalist
- Joe Just, MLB player
- Jane Kaczmarek, actress; best known as Lois in Malcolm in the Middle
- Brian "Kato" Kaelin, actor and house guest of O. J. Simpson during murders of Nicole Brown Simpson and Ronald Goldman
- Bob Kames, musician; popularized The Chicken Dance
- Karl Kassulke, NFL player
- Phil Katz, inventor of Zip archive file format
- Marie Kazmierczak, All-American Girls Professional Baseball League player
- Francis B. Keene, U.S. diplomat
- Ken Keltner, MLB player
- Skip Kendall (born 1964), professional golfer
- Jacob J. Killa, Wisconsin state representative
- Don Kindt, NFL player
- Don Kindt Jr., NFL player
- Louis Joseph Kirn, U.S. Navy admiral
- Jerry Kleczka, U.S. representative
- Red Kleinow, MLB player
- Scott Klement, computer scientist
- Al Klug, professional football player
- Tony Knap, head coach of Utah State, Boise State and UNLV football teams
- Richard A. Knobloch, U.S. Air Force general
- Kon Knueppel, basketball player
- Donald Knuth, computer scientist and author of The Art of Computer Programming
- Oscar Koch, U.S. Army general, member of Military Intelligence Hall of Fame
- Herman Koehler, head coach of Army football team; Master of the Sword of the United States Military Academy
- John J. Koepsell, Wisconsin state representative and businessman
- Herb Kohl, U.S. senator
- Don Kojis, NBA player
- Walter Charles Kraatz, zoologist
- Alvin Kraenzlein, Olympic gold medalist, member of National Track & Field Hall of Fame and United States Olympic Hall of Fame
- Jack Kramer, professional football player
- Ken Kranz, NFL player
- Ken Kratz (born c. 1960), lawyer, former district attorney of Calumet County, Wisconsin; law license was suspended for four months after sexting scandal
- Clarence Kretlow, Wisconsin state representative
- Gus Krock, MLB player
- Leo Krzycki (1881–1966), labor union leader
- Tony Kubek, MLB player
- Ray Kuffel, professional football player
- Walter Kunicki, Wisconsin State Assembly
- Ralph Kurek, NFL player
- Craig Kusick, MLB player
- August W. Laabs, Wisconsin State Assembly
- Chet Laabs, MLB player
- Lakeyah, musician
- Carl Landry, NBA player
- Marcus Landry, NBA player
- Irv Langhoff, NFL player
- Jacob Latimore, singer and dancer
- Donald Laub, noted plastic surgeon
- Jacob Laubenheimer, former chief of the Milwaukee Police Department and founder of the world's first police academy
- Tom Laughlin, actor
- Tom Lee, professional baseball player
- David Lenz, artist
- John Leonora, professor of physiology and pharmacology at Loma Linda University
- Louise Lester, actress
- Dave Levenick, NFL player
- DeAndre Levy, NFL player
- Liberace, pianist and entertainer (West Allis)
- Al Lindow, NFL player
- James G. Lippert, Wisconsin state representative and lawyer
- Jacob J. Litza Jr., Wisconsin state representative and businessman
- Dick Loepfe, NFL player
- Kevon Looney, NBA player
- Fred Luderus, MLB player
- Arno H. Luehman, U.S. Air Force major general
- Otto Luening (1900–1996), composer, early pioneer of electronic music
- Jerry Lunz, NFL player
- Alfred Lunt, Tony Award and Emmy Award-winning Broadway actor; appeared in over 24 plays with his wife Lynn Fontanne
- Rube Lutzke, MLB player
- Mel Maceau, professional football player
- Sandy MacKay, Michigan state representative
- Steve Mackay, drummer of Oil Tasters, BoDeans, Violent Femmes, Radio Romeo
- Beezie Madden, Olympic gold medalist
- Mark Maddox, NFL player
- Ira Madison III, television writer and podcaster
- Greg Mahlberg, MLB player
- Lester Maitland, pioneer U.S. Army aviator; in 1927, with Albert Hegenberger, completed first flight from California to Hawaii
- David John Malloy, Roman Catholic bishop
- Dave Manders, NFL player
- Tom Mangan, Minnesota state legislator and educator
- Bob Mann, pro golfer
- Carl von Marr, painter
- Trixie Mattel, drag queen
- Tracy Mattes, track and field athlete and humanitarian
- John Matuszak, actor and NFL player
- Bob Mavis, professional baseball player
- George McBride, MLB manager
- Tim McCann, NFL player
- Arthur L. McCullough, U.S. Air Force general
- Ed McCully, Christian missionary killed during Operation Auca
- John McGivern, actor and writer
- Darel McKinney, Navy Cross and Distinguished Service Cross recipient
- Chuck Mercein, NFL player for the New York Giants, Green Bay Packers, and the New York Jets
- John L. Merkt, Wisconsin State Assembly
- Walter L. Merten, Wisconsin State Senate
- Louis L. Merz, member of the Wisconsin State Assembly
- Albert Gregory Meyer, archbishop of Roman Catholic Archdiocese of Chicago
- Phil Micech, NFL player
- Candice Michelle, wrestler, model and actress, best known for television ads for Go Daddy
- Abner J. Mikva, judge of the U.S. Court of Appeals
- Dick Miller, NBA player
- Thomas L. Miller, TV producer, co-founder of Miller-Boyett Productions
- Milverine (John Hamann), local celebrity known for looking like Wolverine while walking shirtless
- Newton N. Minow, chairman of Federal Communications Commission
- Robert J. Modrzejewski, Medal of Honor recipient
- David Mogilka, lawyer and politician
- Jake Moreland, NFL player; assistant coach with Western Michigan Broncos football team
- Andrew "The Butcher" Mrotek, drummer for rock band The Academy Is...
- Aloisius Joseph Muench, Roman Catholic cardinal
- Joseph C. Murphy, Michigan state representative
- Robert Daniel Murphy, U.S. diplomat
- Rose Namajunas, mixed martial artist
- Alfredo Narciso, actor
- Clem Neacy, NFL player
- Kurt Neumann, singer, guitarist, and songwriter of the BoDeans
- Kurt Nimphius, NBA player
- Charles Niss, Wisconsin state legislator and businessman
- Suzana Norberg, actress
- Haskell Noyes, conservationist
- Pat O'Brien, actor with over 100 screen credits
- Elli Ochowicz, Olympic athlete
- Robert Emmett O'Connor, actor
- Tad J. Oelstrom, U.S. Air Force lieutenant general
- Arike Ogunbowale, WNBA player
- Dare Ogunbowale, NFL player
- Nancy Olson, actress
- Chuck Ortmann, NFL player
- Oscar Osthoff, Olympic gold medalist; head coach of Washington State football team
- Nik Pace, first runner-up of America's Next Top Model, cycle 5
- Raymond A. Palmer, editor and author
- Frank Parker, International Tennis Hall of Fame member; won both the French and U.S. Championships
- Les Paul, jazz guitarist, inventor, pioneer in development of solid-body electric guitar (Waukesha)
- Don Pavletich, MLB player
- Cheryl Pawelski, record producer (Omnivore Recordings)
- Jim Peck, host of game shows The Big Showdown and Three's a Crowd; local history show I Remember Milwaukee
- Pat Peppler, NFL head coach
- Anthony Pettis, mixed martial artist signed with UFC
- Vel Phillips, politician, jurist and activist
- Amy Pietz, actress, known for role as Annie Spadaro in sitcom Caroline in the City
- Robert B. Pinter, biomedical engineer
- Paul Poberezny, founder of Experimental Aircraft Association and member of National Aviation Hall of Fame
- Milton Rice Polland, Marshall Islands diplomat
- Glen Pommerening, Wisconsin legislator
- Jordan Poole, NBA player
- Terry Porter, NBA player and head coach of Milwaukee Bucks
- Karl Priebe, artist
- Gene Puerling, singer
- Charlotte Rae (Lubotsky), TV/stage actress and singer; acted in Diff'rent Strokes and The Facts of Life
- Ellen Raskin, author, illustrator, and fashion designer; recipient of Newbery Medal
- Scottie Ray, actor
- Joel Rechlicz, NHL player
- Marshall Reckard, mechanic and politician
- Louise Goff Reece, U.S. representative from Tennessee
- William Rehnquist, former chief justice of the United States Supreme Court (Shorewood)
- John E. Reilly Jr., Wisconsin legislator and judge
- Paul Samuel Reinsch, U.S. diplomat
- Henry S. Reuss, U.S. representative
- John Ridley, author, television and movie producer
- Brad Rigby, MLB player
- Stuart Rindy, NFL player
- Jim Risch, U.S. senator from Idaho
- Nick Roach, NFL player
- Fritz Roeseler, NFL player
- Duke Roufus, 4-time world kickboxing champion, UFC coach
- Brad Rowe, actor
- Loret Miller Ruppe, U.S. diplomat
- Margaret A. Rykowski, U.S. Navy admiral
- Herbert J. Ryser, mathematician, Bruck-Chowla-Ryser theorem and Ryser formula are named for him
- Ben L. Salomon, Medal of Honor recipient
- John Scardina, NFL player
- Christopher Scarver, convicted murderer who killed Jeffrey Dahmer
- John C. Schafer, U.S. representative
- Mike Schank, actor and musician; best known as subject of American Movie
- Arlie Schardt, Olympic gold medalist
- Bob Scherbarth, MLB player
- Richard Schickel, author, film critic, and filmmaker
- Augustine Francis Schinner, first Roman Catholic Bishop of the Diocese of Superior
- Charles Asa Schleck, Roman Catholic bishop
- Herman Alfred Schmid, U.S. Air Force general
- Charles C. Schmidt, Wisconsin state legislator
- John G. Schmitz, U.S. representative from California
- Frank Schneiberg, MLB player
- Roy Schoemann, NFL player
- Otto Schomberg, professional baseball player
- Paul Schramka, MLB player
- Charles M. Schrimpf, Wisconsin state representative
- Michael Schultz, filmmaker and television director
- Mark J. Seitz, Roman Catholic bishop
- Bud Selig, MLB commissioner, owner of Milwaukee Brewers
- Paul Shenar, actor
- Paul Sicula, Wisconsin state representative
- Cornelius Sidler, Wisconsin state representative
- John Otto Siegel, Medal of Honor recipient
- Lance Sijan, first USAFA graduate to be awarded the Medal of Honor
- Carl Silvestri, NFL player
- Al Simmons, Hall of Fame Major League Baseball player
- Herbert A. Simon, Nobel Prize laureate and Turing Award winner for work in artificial intelligence, cognition, and decision-making
- John Sisk Jr., NFL player
- Steve Sisolak, governor of Nevada
- Leland Sklar, bass player
- Fred R. Sloan, U.S. Air National Guard major general
- Dave Smith, professional football player
- Dick Smith, software engineer and computer consultant
- Tom Snyder, talk show host of The Tomorrow Show and The Late Late Show with Tom Snyder
- Samuel W. Soule, co-inventor of first practical typewriter, with Christopher Sholes and Carlos Glidden
- Speech, musician, lead singer of Arrested Development
- Latrell Sprewell, four-time All-Star professional basketball player
- Clement Stachowiak, Wisconsin state representative
- Drew Stafford, NHL player
- Kenneth M. Stampp, professor of history at the University of California, Berkeley
- Howard Stark, NFL player
- Pete Stark, U.S. representative from California
- Jerome Steever, Olympic medalist
- Henry J. Stehling, U.S. Air Force general
- Christian Steinmetz, member of Naismith Memorial Basketball Hall of Fame
- Erich C. Stern, Wisconsin state representative and lawyer
- Bill Stetz, NFL player
- Brooks Stevens, automotive and industrial designer who developed the concept of planned obsolescence
- Lester Stevens, Olympic athlete
- Anne Steytler, activist and feminist who co-founded the Women's Center & Shelter of Greater Pittsburgh, one of the first six domestic violence response and prevention centers in the United States
- Philip Stieg, neurosurgeon
- Joseph Stika, U.S. Coast Guard vice admiral
- Diamond Stone, basketball player
- Herbert Stothart, film composer, member of the Songwriters Hall of Fame
- Peter Straub, fiction writer and poet; best known as a horror-genre author
- Daryl Stuermer, lead guitarist for Phil Collins, guitar and bass for Genesis
- Johnny Strzykalski, NFL player
- Timothy S. Sullivan, U.S. Coast Guard admiral
- Jayapataka Swami, religious leader for International Society for Krishna Consciousness
- George Talsky, businessman and politician
- Jack Taschner, MLB player
- Todd Temkin, contemporary poet and cultural activist
- Clinton Textor, Wisconsin state representative
- Reinhold Thiessenhusen, Wisconsin state representative
- Fred Thomas, MLB player
- Arthur Thrall, artist
- Matthew Tonner, musician and music producer of The 502s
- Spencer Tracy, actor who appeared in 74 films from 1930 to 1967
- Clement A. Trott, U.S. Army major general
- Dan Turk, NFL player
- Alfred Tweedy, Connecticut state senator
- Aaron Twerski (born 1939), lawyer and the Irwin and Jill Cohen Professor of Law at Brooklyn Law School, former dean and professor of tort law at Hofstra University School of Law
- Judy Tyler (Judith Mae Hess), actress, starred opposite Elvis Presley in Jailhouse Rock
- Bob Uecker, MLB player, actor, and Hall of Fame sportscaster
- Neal Ulevich, photographer, recipient of the Pulitzer Prize
- James Valcq, composer
- Hoyt Vandenberg, general, U.S. Air Force
- Nick Viall, contestant on The Bachelor
- Paul Wagner, MLB player
- Steve Wagner, NFL player
- Lutz Wahl, U.S. Army major general; adjutant general of U.S. Army
- James W. Wahner, educator and Wisconsin state representative
- Herman V. Wall, photographer
- John A. Wall, lawyer and Wisconsin state representative
- Norm Wallen, MLB player
- Neale Donald Walsch, best-selling author of Conversations With God
- Jim Waskiewicz, NFL player
- Bruce Weber, head coach of University of Illinois men's basketball team
- Bill Weir, television journalist, co-anchor of ABC's Good Morning America Weekend Edition
- Norman Wengert, political scientist
- Gary George Wetzel, Medal of Honor recipient
- Joel Whitburn, author and music historian
- Jane Wiedlin, guitarist, vocalist, most notably for The Go-Go's
- Ken Wiesner, Olympic medalist
- John Wilde, painter
- Gene Wilder, actor known for Willy Wonka & the Chocolate Factory and collaborations with Mel Brooks, husband of Gilda Radner
- Robert Wilke, Air Force Cross recipient
- Mike Wilks, NBA player
- Red Wilson, MLB player
- Elmer Winter (1912–2009), founder of Manpower Inc.
- Edward Wollert, Navy Cross and Distinguished Service Cross recipient
- Whitey Wolter, NFL player
- Neil Worden, NFL player
- Sylvia Wronski, All-American Girls Professional Baseball League player (Milwaukee Chicks)
- Frank Albert Young, Medal of Honor recipient
- Clement J. Zablocki, U.S. representative
- Ozias M. Zander, architect
- Frank P. Zeidler, ex-mayor of Milwaukee, Socialist Party USA leader
- Will Zens, filmmaker
- Nicholas S. Zeppos, chancellor of Vanderbilt University
- Steve Ziem, MLB player
- Chip Zien, actor
- Ray Zillmer, attorney, mountaineer, and conservationist
- John A. Zoller, Wisconsin legislator
- Charlotte Zucker, actress, mother of David and Jerry Zucker
- David Zucker, film director, Airplane! and Top Secret!
- Jerry Zucker, film director, Airplane! and Top Secret!
- Bea Millan-Windorski, Filipino and American beauty pageant titleholder.

== Born elsewhere, raised in Milwaukee ==
The following people were not born in Milwaukee, but spent a significant amount of their growing-up years in the city.

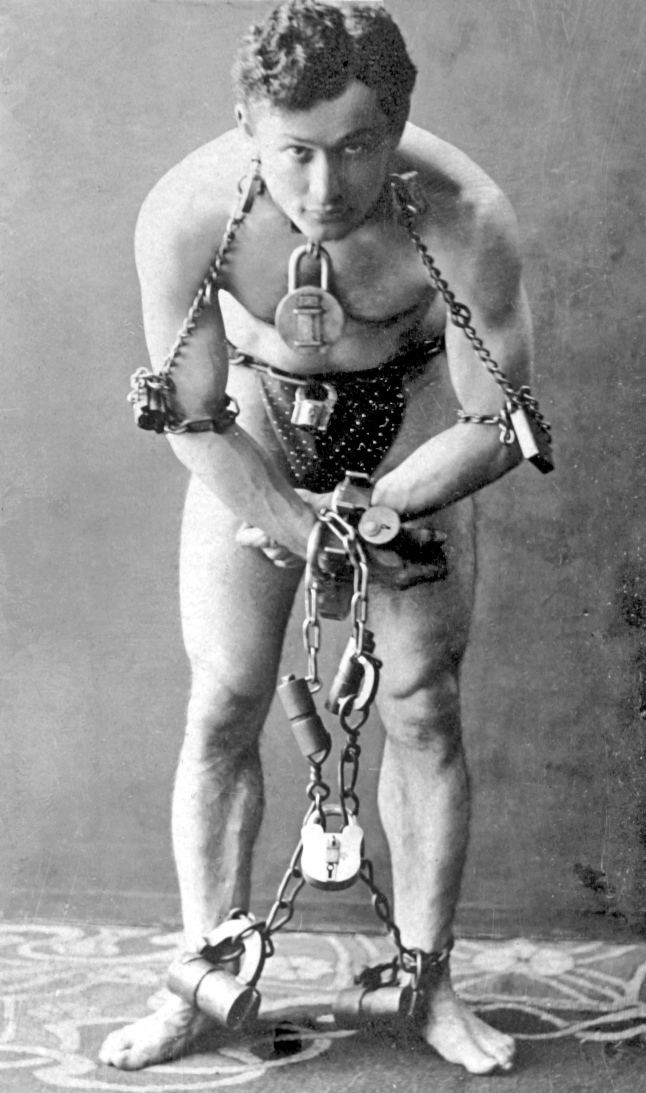
Houdini

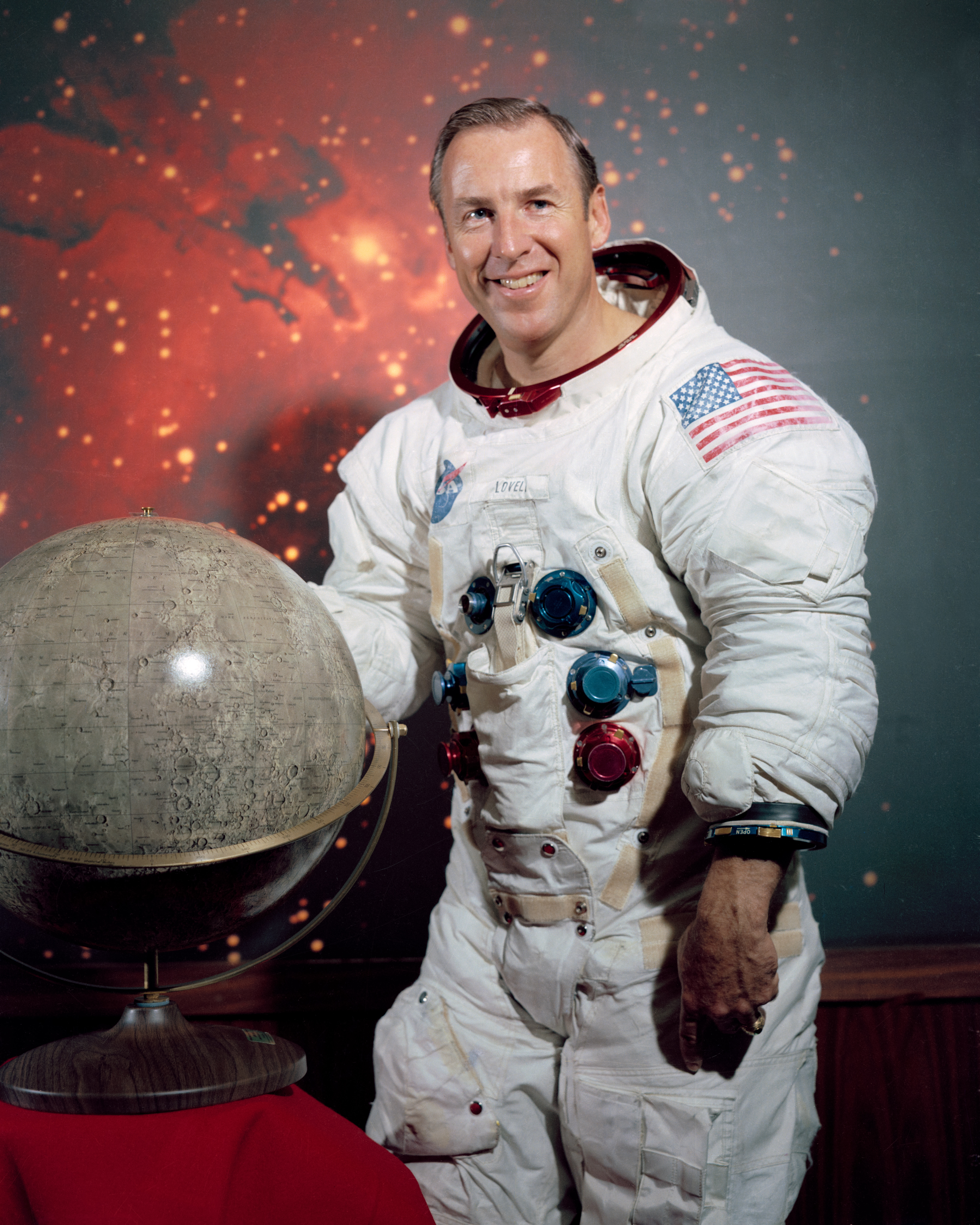
Jim Lovell

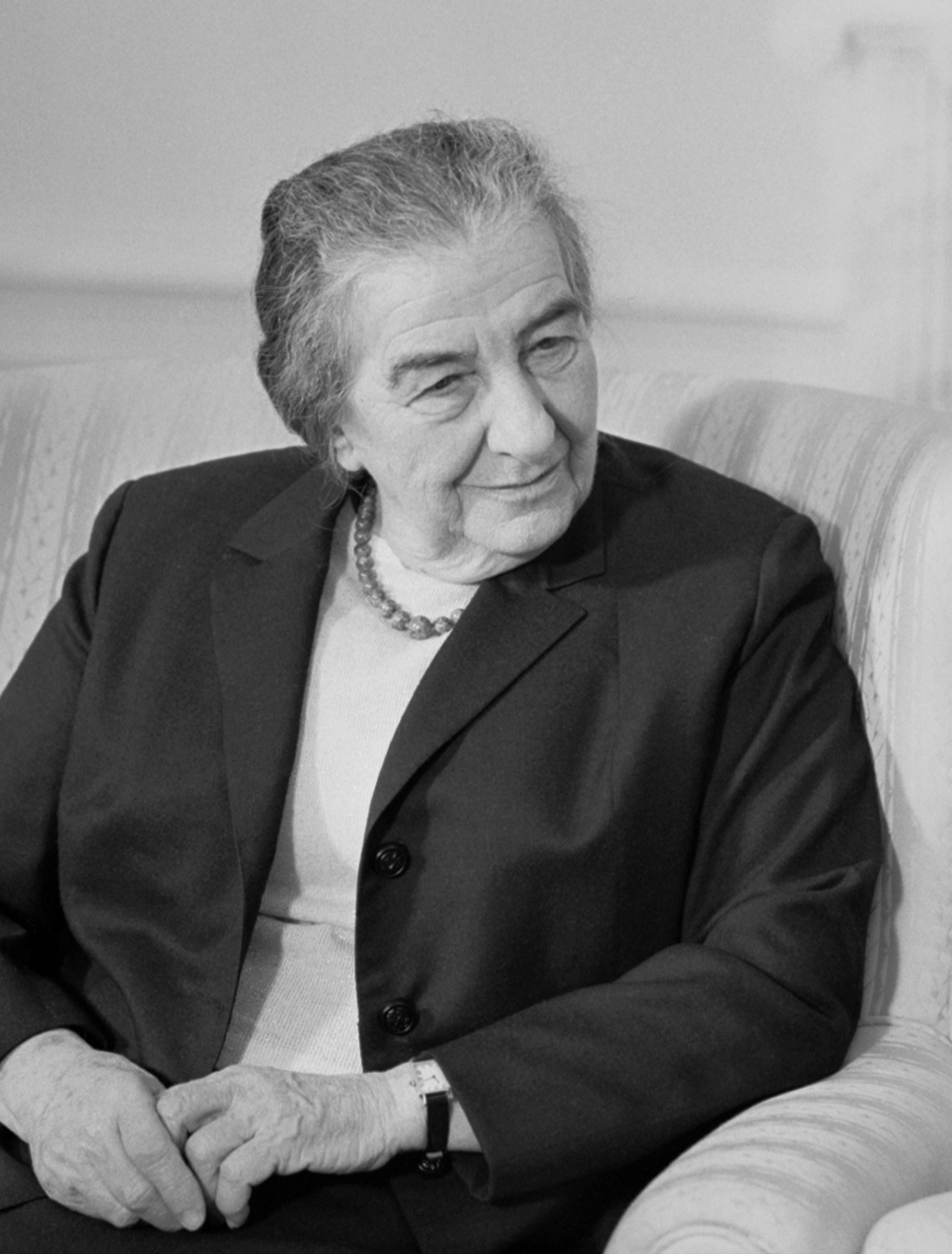
Golda Meir

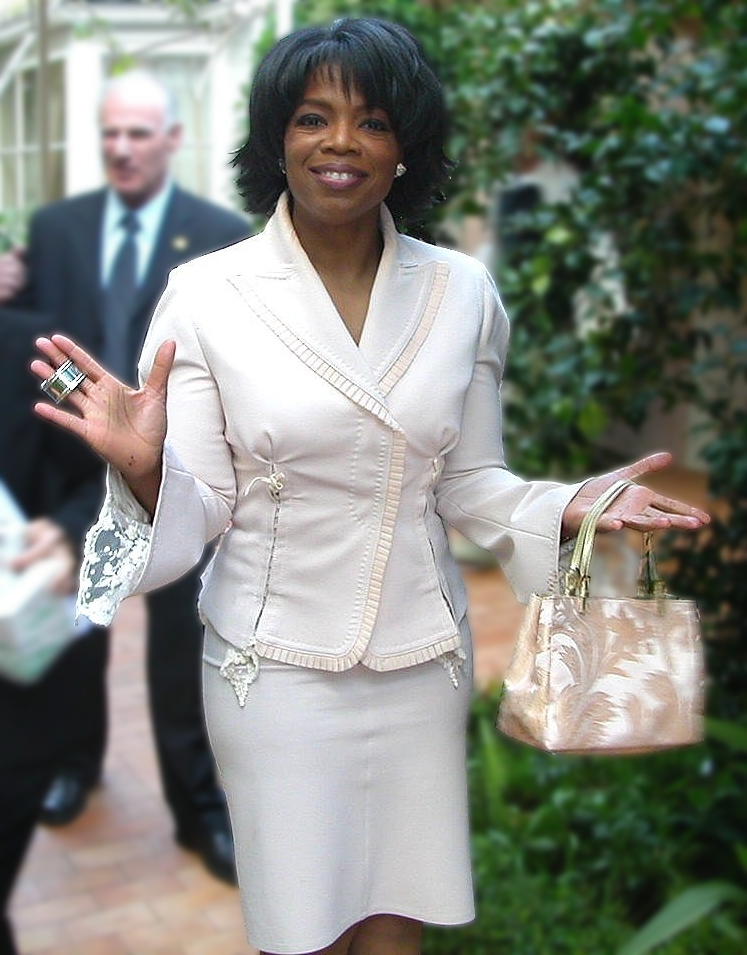
Oprah Winfrey

- Naima Adedapo, American Idol finalist
- Shauna Singh Baldwin, Canadian-born author currently living in Milwaukee
- Elizabeth Banks, journalist
- Jacob Best, founder of what became the Pabst Brewing Company
- Elizabeth Baker Bohan, author, journalist, artist, social reformer
- Andrew H. Boncel, Wisconsin state legislator and newspaper editor
- Jack Carson, actor, Mildred Pierce, Cat on a Hot Tin Roof, A Star Is Born
- Keo Coleman, NFL player
- Michael Cudahy, industrialist, great-uncle of Michael Cudahy (electronics entrepreneur)
- Patrick Cudahy, industrialist
- Victor DeLorenzo, drummer for punk-rock group, the Violent Femmes
- Humphrey J. Desmond, Wisconsin legislator, lawyer, writer, and newspaper editor
- Colleen Dewhurst, Canadian-born actress raised in Milwaukee, two-time Tony Award winner, four-time Emmy Award winner
- Joel Ehrendreich, US career diplomat, current ambassador to Palau (2023)
- Walter E. Ellis, serial killer
- Clarke Fischer, NFL player
- Garrett M. Fitzgerald, politician
- Evelyn Frechette, lover and accomplice of John Dillinger
- Gordon Gano, lead singer, guitarist and songwriter for the Violent Femmes
- Charles Goldenberg (1911–1986), Odessa-born All-Pro NFL player
- Wallace Wilson Graham, Wisconsin lawyer and politician
- Joseph Graybill, actor
- Elmer Grey, architect and painter
- Stone Hallquist, NFL player
- Albert Hammond, politician
- Matthea Harvey, poet
- Houdini, illusionist and stunt performer
- Jeffrey Hunter, actor, The Searchers, King of Kings
- John Johnson, NBA basketball player, First Team All-American at University of Iowa
- Warren S. Johnson, founder of Johnson Controls
- Kristen Johnston, born in Washington DC, raised in Whitefish Bay; played Sally Solomon in 3rd Rock from the Sun
- Josette Vieau Juneau, Métis "founding mother" of Milwaukee
- Al C. Kalmbach, born in Sturgeon Bay, Wisconsin, founder of Kalmbach Publishing
- Keedy, singer
- Harold Klemp, leader of Eckankar
- Tim Knoll, freestyle BMX rider
- Leon L. Lewis, attorney, spymaster, and Jewish community leader
- Rico Love, rapper and songwriter
- Jim Lovell, former NASA astronaut and commander of the Apollo 13 mission; namesake of James Lovell Street
- James Ludington, founder of Columbus, Wisconsin and Ludington, Michigan
- John Luick, American Civil War veteran; founder of Luick Ice Cream
- Arie Luyendyk Jr., professional auto racer, The Bachelorette contestant (Brookfield)
- Arthur MacArthur Jr., Medal of Honor recipient, military governor of the Philippines
- Rick Majerus, basketball coach; son of Raymond Majerus
- Golda Meir, a founder of State of Israel; served as minister of labor, foreign minister, and prime minister; graduated from the University of Wisconsin–Milwaukee
- Billy Mitchell, general, regarded as "father" of United States Air Force
- Gwen Moore, U.S. representative, former Wisconsin state senator and Wisconsin state assemblywoman
- Ronald Myers, noted Baptist minister
- Joseph Arthur Padway, socialist politician
- Ray Phillips, NFL player
- Henry A. Reed, US Army brigadier general
- Emma May Alexander Reinertsen, writer, social reformer
- Antonio R. Riley, Midwest Regional Administrator of the United States Department of Housing and Urban Development
- Martin P. Robinson, creator and puppeteer for the Jim Henson Company; puppeteer for Telly Monster, Mr. Snuffleupagus and Slimey (Brookfield)
- Gena Rowlands, Oscar-nominated actress, four-time Emmy Award winner
- Mark Rylance, theater actor and director; director of Shakespeare's Globe Theatre in London, two-time Tony Award winner
- David J. Saposs, economist
- Landy Scott, champion race car driver
- Edward Steichen, in 1900 left Milwaukee for NYC, met Alfred Stieglitz who was married to Georgia O'Keeffe; world's highest-paid photographer
- Lou Sullivan, born in Wauwatosa, Wisconsin, raised in Milkwaukee; transgender rights activist and historian
- Mike Taylor, NBA player
- Edwin F. Townsend, US Army brigadier general
- Fred W. Vetter Jr., U.S. Air Force general
- George H. Walther, Wisconsin state representative
- Walter Wangerin Jr., author
- Garrett Weber-Gale, U.S. Olympic swimmer
- Stanley G. Weinbaum, science fiction writer
- Oprah Winfrey, talk show host and media mogul
- Roger H. Zion, U.S. representative from Indiana

== Born in Milwaukee, raised elsewhere ==
The following people were born in Milwaukee, but spent most (if not all) of their growing-up years away from the city.

- Walter Annenberg, billionaire publisher, philanthropist, and creator of Annenberg Foundation
- Austin Aries, professional wrestler, former world champion
- J. Ogden Armour, owner and president of Armour and Company
- Paul M. Blayney, U.S. Coast Guard admiral
- Richard Nelson Bolles, author
- Jonah Bride, baseball player
- Rachel Brosnahan, actress
- Coo Coo Cal, singer, rapper
- Raja Chari, astronaut candidate
- Leroy Chiao, astronaut, commander and science officer of 10th expedition to International Space Station
- Gertrude Crocker, suffragist
- George Croil, Royal Canadian Air Force air marshal; first chief of the Air Staff
- Jeffrey Dahmer, serial killer raised in Ohio; returned to Milwaukee where he also committed acts of necrophilia and cannibalism
- Dan Davies, actor and screenwriter
- Ruth Bachhuber Doyle, member of Wisconsin Assembly, raised in Wausau; mother of Wisconsin Governor Jim Doyle
- Edward T. Foote II, former president of the University of Miami
- Alex Galchenyuk, hockey player for the AHL's Colorado Eagles
- Jeff Gillan, journalist
- Doug Gottlieb, ESPN analyst, host of The Doug Gottlieb Show
- Heather Graham, film actress; best known for role as Roller Girl in Boogie Nights
- Mark Grudzielanek, MLB player
- Herbert James Hagerman, governor of New Mexico Territory
- Andrea Hall, twin sister of soap actress Deidre Hall; best known for her role as Samantha Evans on Days of Our Lives
- Deidre Hall, actress on soap opera Days of Our Lives and twin sister of actress Andrea Hall
- Dennis Hall, world champion wrestler, Olympic medalist; Pan American Games gold medalist
- Susan Lynn Hefle, food allergen scientist
- Ben Heller, MLB pitcher
- Ed Hochuli, NFL referee
- Michael Huebsch, politician
- Ernie Johnson Jr., Emmy Award-winning sportscaster
- Colin Kaepernick, quarterback for San Francisco 49ers
- Eric Kelly, NFL player
- George F. Kennan, architect of U.S. Cold War policy of containment of Soviet Union
- Jalmar M. Kerttula, longest-serving member of the Alaska Legislature (1961–1963 and 1965–1995)
- Pee Wee King, songwriter, recording artist, and television entertainer; inducted into the Country Music Hall of Fame
- Jacob Latimore, R&B singer
- James J. Lindsay, U.S. Army general; first commander of United States Special Operations Command
- Bobby Marshall, NFL player, member of College Football Hall of Fame
- Ava Max, singer-songwriter
- Verne Meisner, polka musician
- Chris Mihm, NBA player
- Bea Millan-Windorski, Filipino and American beauty pageant titleholder; Miss Earth USA 2024, Miss Earth Water 2024, and Miss Universe Philippines 2026
- Steve Miller, musician, Steve Miller Band
- Raymond J. Moyer, politician
- Amir Omar, Texas politician
- Leslie Osborne, WPS player
- Peter Palmer, Broadway and film actor, most notably as Li'l Abner
- Otto A. Paulsen, Minnesota state representative and farmer
- Andre Phillips, Olympic gold medalist
- Armintie Price, WNBA player
- Joe Randa, MLB player
- Robert D. Richardson, biographer and historian
- Jay Schroeder, NFL player
- Mary Shane, pioneer sportscaster
- Cordwainer Smith (Paul Myron Anthony Linebarger), science fiction writer, East Asian scholar and expert in psychological warfare
- Bart Stupak, U.S. representative from Michigan
- Austin Surhoff, swimmer
- Eric Szmanda, actor, played Greg Sanders on CSI
- Peter G. Torkildsen, U.S. representative from Massachusetts
- Butch Woolfolk, NFL player

== Born and raised elsewhere ==
The following people were not born or raised in Milwaukee, but have a significant connection(s) to the city.

- Hank Aaron, Major League Baseball Hall of Famer; all-time leader in home runs; played majority of MLB career in Milwaukee
- Kareem Abdul-Jabbar, NBA Hall of Famer and first draft choice of Milwaukee Bucks
- George Abert, member of the Wisconsin State Assembly; father of George A. Abert
- Andrew J. Aikens, newspaper editor
- Anson Allen, politician and businessman
- Ray Allen, Milwaukee Bucks player 1996–2003
- Edward P. Allis, co-founder of Allis-Chalmers Manufacturing Company
- John Anderson, NFL player
- Mathilde Franziska Anneke, feminist
- Giannis Antetokounmpo, Milwaukee Bucks player
- Jimmy Archer, MLB player
- Philip Danforth Armour, founder of Armour and Company
- Jap Barbeau, MLB player
- Lloyd Barbee, Wisconsin legislator
- William A. Barstow, governor of Wisconsin; Union Army general
- John M Barth, chairman and chief executive officer of Johnson Controls
- John Knowlton Bartlett, vice president of American Medical Association
- Charles S. Benton, U.S. representative from New York
- Insoo Kim Berg, psychotherapist
- Victor L. Berger, first Socialist elected to U.S. House of Representatives
- William Joshua Blackmon, street preacher and artist
- Fred Blair, labor activist and politician
- Valentin Blatz, founder of Valentin Blatz Brewing Company
- Aaron T. Bliss, U.S. representative from Michigan
- Robert Bloch, science fiction, fantasy and horror writer, author of Psycho
- Ernest Borgnine, Academy Award-winning actor
- Matthias J. Bovee, U.S. representative from New York
- Emil Breitkreutz, Olympic medalist; head coach of USC Trojans men's basketball team
- Arthur Louis Breslich, president of German Wallace College and Baldwin-Wallace College
- Bunny Brief, MLB player
- Erhard Brielmaier, architect, designed many Milwaukee churches, buildings, and schools including The Basilica of St. Josaphat recipient
- Cecil B. Brown Jr., civil rights activist and legislator
- John A. Bryan, U.S. diplomat
- Larry Bucshon, U.S. representative from Illinois
- Chris Bury, television journalist, Nightline correspondent
- Charles C. Byrne, U.S. Army general
- James Cameron, civil rights activist
- Raymond Joseph Cannon, U.S. representative, attorney for the accused players during Black Sox Scandal
- Al Capone, Chicago gangster; had a "home" in Brookfield during Prohibition
- Carrie Carlton (1834–1868), poet, writer, journalist; published a book of poetry in Milwaukee during the early Civil War era
- Bill Carollo, NFL referee
- Sam Cassell, NBA player for Milwaukee Bucks
- Benjamin F. Church, 1835 pioneer, builder and contractor; built Benjamin Church House, now a museum
- Pep Clark, MLB player
- Dighton Corson, justice of the South Dakota Supreme Court
- Georgia Cozzini, politician
- Toby Crabel (born 1955), hedge fund manager and tennis player.
- Harriet L. Cramer, publisher of The Evening Wisconsin, a daily newspaper in Milwaukee
- John D. Cummins, U.S. representative from Ohio
- Lysander Cutler, Union Army general
- Steven E. Day, U.S. Coast Guard admiral
- Willem Dafoe, actor, from Appleton, WI, lived in Milwaukee while with Theatre X in Third Ward
- Peter V. Deuster, diplomat
- Gene DeWeese, author
- Dustin Diamond, actor, "Screech" on Saved by the Bell sitcom; resided in Port Washington
- Joseph Doe, U.S. assistant secretary of war
- Timothy Dolan, archbishop of the Roman Catholic Archdiocese of New York
- Charlie Dougherty, MLB player
- Tom Dougherty, MLB player
- David Draiman, rock musician, singer in heavy metal band Disturbed
- F. Ryan Duffy, judge of the U.S. Court of Appeals
- Clifford Durr, member of Federal Communications Commission
- Hi Ebright, MLB player
- Lois Ehlert, illustrator; Caldecott Medal recipient
- Michael Elconin, member of Wisconsin State Assembly
- Gary Ellerson, NFL player for Green Bay Packers and Detroit Lions
- Alter Esselin, Yiddish poet, carpenter, 1889–1974
- Charles E. Estabrook, Wisconsin attorney general
- Ole Evinrude, founder of Evirude Outboard Motors, inventor of first outboard motor with practical commercial application
- Edward T. Fairchild, jurist
- Chris Farley, born in Madison, Wisconsin, graduated from Marquette University; comedian and actor; cast member on Saturday Night Live
- Asahel Finch Jr., lawyer and politician
- Albert Fowler, mayor of Rockford, Illinois
- Charles F. Freeman, businessman and politician
- Harold A. Fritz, Medal of Honor recipient
- Ezekiel Gillespie, activist for equal rights for African Americans
- Luther F. Gilson, businessman and politician
- Guy D. Goff, U.S. senator from West Virginia
- Laurence Gross, playwright; lived and died in Milwaukee
- Paul Grottkau, radical newspaper publisher and labor organizer
- William G. Haan, U.S. Army major general
- Jackson Hadley, politician and businessman
- Ardie Clark Halyard (1896–1989), co-owner of the first black-owned bank in Milwaukee
- J.J. Hagerman, industrialist
- Doc Hamann, baseball player
- Charles Smith Hamilton, Union Army major general
- Gustav Otto Ludolf Heine, owner of Heine-Velox
- James L. Herdt, 9th master chief petty officer of the Navy
- Osia Joslyn Hiles, philanthropist and poet, heavily involved in many Milwaukee philanthropies such as the Wisconsin Humane Society
- Harrison Carroll Hobart, Union Army general
- Adrian Hoecken, Dutch missionary to the first nations
- Timothy E. Hoeksema, chairman of Midwest Air Group
- Roy Hoffmann, U.S. Navy admiral
- James Holliday, lawyer
- Bert Husting, MLB player
- John L. Jerstad, Medal of Honor recipient
- Electa Amanda Wright Johnson, philanthropist, writer
- Solomon Juneau, fur trader, land speculator, and co-founder of City of Milwaukee
- Francis Enmer Kearns, bishop of The Methodist Church and the United Methodist Church
- Alice Beck Kehoe, anthropologist
- Byron Kilbourn, Wisconsin railroad executive, politician, and co-founder of Milwaukee
- Jack Kilby, Nobel laureate and co-inventor of the integrated circuit (IC)
- Charles King, U.S. Army general
- Rufus King, Union Army general
- Adam Kinzinger, U.S. representative from Illinois
- Al Klawitter, MLB player
- Sue Klebold, author and mental health activist, studied and graduated from Cardinal Stritch University
- Nap Kloza, professional baseball player and manager
- Elmer Klumpp, MLB player
- Conrad Krez, Union Army general
- Ivanka Mandunić Kuzmanović, Croatian poet and historian
- Dan Lally, MLB player
- John H. Lang, war hero
- Increase A. Lapham, scientist; "father of the U.S. Weather Service"
- Alfred Lawson, credited as inventor of the airliner
- Jerris G. Leonard, administrator of the Law Enforcement Assistance Administration
- Judith Light, actress, star of Who's the Boss; acted in Milwaukee theater at "the Rep"
- Reginald Lisowski, professional wrestler known as "The Crusher"
- Casey Loomis, Navy Cross and Distinguished Service Cross recipient
- Scott Lorenz, MLS player
- Frank Luce, MLB player
- Arie Luyendyk, two-time Indianapolis 500 winner (Brookfield)
- Arthur MacArthur Sr, judge; father of Arthur MacArthur Jr and grandfather of General Douglas MacArthur
- Douglas MacArthur, U.S. Army general; U.S. Army chief of staff; Medal of Honor recipient
- Raymond Majerus, labor leader; father of Rick Majerus
- Dan Marion, MLB player
- Henry H. Markham, U.S. representative from California
- Hattie McDaniel, Academy Award-winning actress; the first African American to win an Academy Award
- Francis E. McGovern, 22nd governor of Wisconsin
- Al McGuire, college basketball coach and television commentator, head coach of Marquette national championship team
- Eschines P. Matthews, Wisconsin assemblyman and businessman
- Khris Middleton, Milwaukee Bucks player
- Frederick Miller, brewing magnate and founder of Miller Brewing Company; grandfather of Fred Miller
- Elias Molee, journalist; linguist
- Paul Molitor, baseball Hall of Famer; longtime player for Milwaukee Brewers
- Mary Mortimer (1816–1877), British-born American educator
- Frank Murray, head coach of Marquette Golden Avalanche and Virginia Cavaliers football teams, member of College Football Hall of Fame
- George New, artist
- George Nicol, MLB player
- Richard J. Nolan, Medal of Honor recipient
- Bill Norman, MLB player and manager
- Karl F. Nystrom, rail engineer; introduced a number of important innovations, including welded lightweight freight and passenger railcars
- John O'Malley, Wisconsin state representative
- Frederick Pabst, brewing magnate of Pabst Brewing Company
- Halbert E. Paine, Union Army general; U.S. representative
- Henry C. Payne, U.S. Postmaster General
- George Wilbur Peck, governor of Wisconsin
- Hal Peck, MLB player
- Carlotta Perry, poet
- Joseph Perry, auxiliary bishop of the Roman Catholic Archdiocese of Chicago
- Jane and Lloyd Pettit, philanthropists of Bradley family fortune, who gifted Bradley Center and Pettit National Ice Center
- Marjorie Peters, All-American Girls Professional Baseball League player, born in Greenfield and a longtime resident of Milwaukee
- Emanuel L. Philipp, 23rd governor of Wisconsin and resident of Milwaukee
- Reince Priebus, chairman of the Republican National Committee
- Michael Redd, Milwaukee Bucks shooting guard, holds Bucks' franchise record for points in a single game with 57
- Adolph Walter Rich, manufacturer and merchant
- Chester J. Roberts, head coach of Miami Redskins football and men's basketball teams
- Paul Robeson, pro football player, actor, singer and social activist
- Henry C. Runkel, lawyer and politician
- Carl Sandburg, author, reporter, poet; worked as organizer for Wisconsin Social Democratic Party at headquarters in Milwaukee; met wife Lilian Steichen (Menomonee Falls) in 1907
- Joseph Schlitz, brewing magnate of now defunct Joseph Schlitz Brewing Company
- Carl Schurz, U.S. secretary of the interior
- John Sharpstein, justice of the California Supreme Court
- Christopher Sholes, printer, politician, and newspaper editor; best known for inventing the modern day typewriter with its QWERTY key layout, while living in Milwaukee
- Abram D. Smith, Wisconsin Supreme Court justice
- Albert Smith, U.S. representative from New York
- George A. Starkweather, U.S. representative from New York
- John Converse Starkweather, Union Army general
- Thomas E. Stidham, NFL assistant coach
- Ellicott R. Stillman, Wisconsin state representative
- William Story, lieutenant governor of Colorado
- Samuel Stritch, Roman Catholic cardinal
- Kenneth E. Stumpf, Medal of Honor recipient
- Ted Sullivan, MLB player and manager
- Monroe Swan, Wisconsin politician
- Jeffrey Tambor, actor, performed at Milwaukee Repertory Theater ("The Rep")
- Paul Francis Tanner, bishop of the Roman Catholic Diocese of St. Augustine
- Adonis Terry, MLB player and umpire
- Charles Thau, figure captured in iconic World War II photo, settled in Milwaukee
- Thomas Toohey, Medal of Honor recipient
- Don A. J. Upham, 4th mayor of Milwaukee
- Franklin Van Valkenburgh, Medal of Honor recipient
- Henry Vianden, artist
- Dwyane Wade, guard for NBA's Miami Heat who played collegiately at Marquette University
- George H. Walker, trader, politician, and co-founder of City of Milwaukee
- Howard Weiss, NFL player
- Tony Welzer, MLB player
- Don S. Wenger, U.S. Air Force major general
- Mae West, actress, screenwriter, playwright, named 15th Greatest Female Film Star of All-Time by the American Film Institute
- Philo White, U.S. diplomat
- James Wieghart, journalist
- Frederick L. Wieseman, U.S. Marine lieutenant general
- Frederick C. Winkler, Union Army general
- George A. Woodward, U.S. Army general
- Cassin Young, Medal of Honor recipient
- Sheila Young, world champion speed skater and cyclist; Olympic gold medalist; member of United States Bicycling Hall of Fame, International Women's Sports Hall of Fame, and National Speedskating Hall of Fame
- Robin Yount, Major League Baseball Hall of Famer; player and bench coach for Milwaukee Brewers
- Elmo Zumwalt, chief of Naval Operations
