= Wollert =

Wollert may refer to:

- Wollert (surname)
- Wollert (given name)
- Wollert, Victoria, Australia, a suburb in Melbourne
