= Calvary Cemetery (Milwaukee) =

Catholic cemetery in Milwaukee, Wisconsin, US

Coordinates: 43.03398°N 87.98196°W

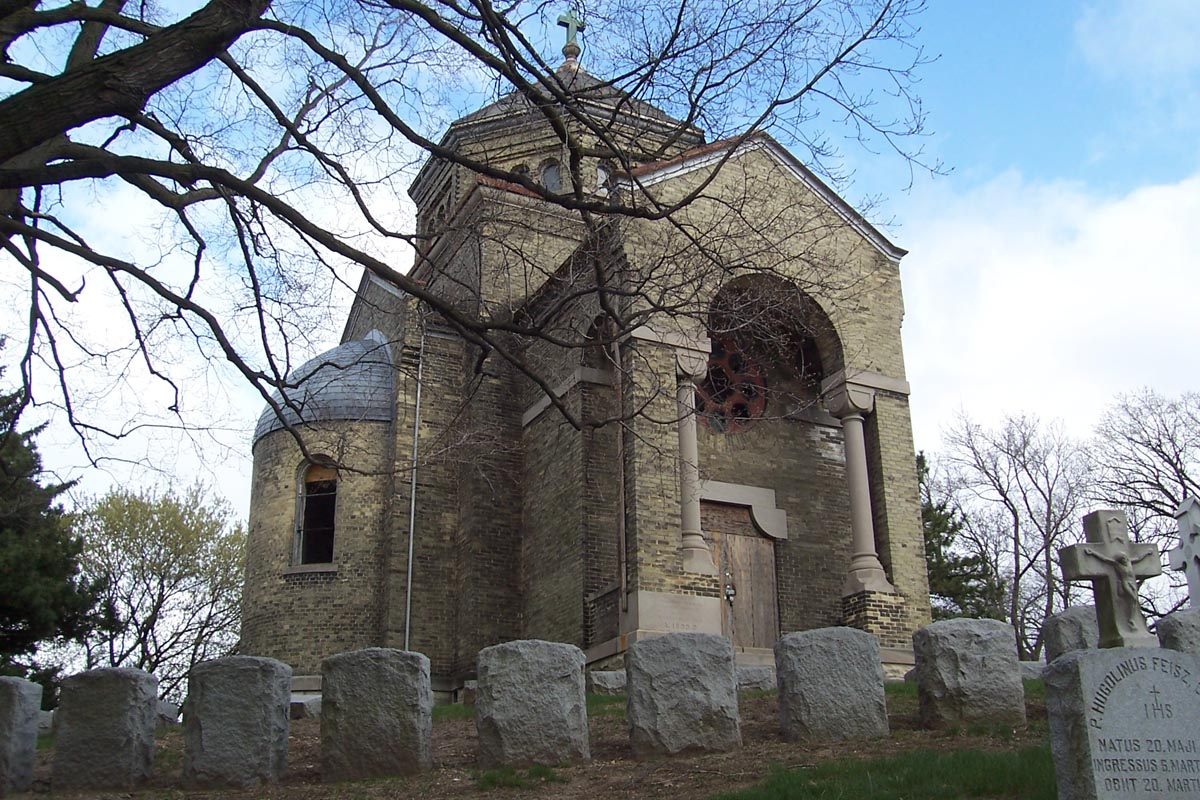
- Chapel Hill
- Interactive map of Calvary Cemetery

Details
- Established: November 2, 1857
- Location: Milwaukee, Wisconsin
- Country: United States
- Type: Catholic cemetery
- Size: 75 acres (30 ha)
- No. of graves: 80,000 (estimated)

Calvary Cemetery is the oldest existing Catholic cemetery in Milwaukee, Wisconsin. Owned by the Archdiocese of Milwaukee, it is the final resting place for many of the city's early influential figures. The cemetery was designated a Milwaukee Landmark in 1981.

With 75 acres (30 ha) and approximately 80,000 interments, the Victorian landscape contains many ornate statues, crypts and monuments.

== History ==
On November 2, 1857, a tract of 55 acres (22 ha) for Calvary Cemetery was consecrated by Archbishop John Henni four miles (6 km) west from the downtown area on Bluemound Road, the first road to be constructed by the Wisconsin Territory.

It was filled with the remains of the 10-acre (4.0 ha) "Old Cemetery," which also contained the remains from Milwaukee's first cemetery established in the First Ward. By 1880 Calvary had 10,307 recorded burials and an additional 20 acres (8.1 ha) were added.

Both the Gothic Revival gate house and Romanesque Revival chapel were designed by architect Erhard Brielmaier, who also designed the Basilica of St. Josaphat. A service building was constructed sometime after 1890 in Queen Anne style using Cream City brick, a distinct light colored brick made locally. The building is still in use today.

The wooden gate house with its triumphal arch and four-story tower was completed in 1897. It is the oldest building on the grounds and was repainted in 2002 when a new storage building was built to the west.

Chapel Hill (originally Jesuit Hill) is one of the highest points in Milwaukee. It is used as a burial site for clergy and members of the various religious orders. Many of the city's early catholic churches such as the Cathedral of St. John the Evangelist, Old St. Mary's and St. Gall's (now Gesu Church) also utilize cemetery grounds. A large Calvary cross stood at the peak until it was replaced with the chapel.

The chapel was built in 1899 using Cream City brick and decorated with stone trim. An arched portico with limestone columns and a rose window set the entrance while three hemispherical apses flank the other three sides. It is crowned by an octagonal tower with a peaked roof and clerestory windows. Dedicated on All Souls Day in 1902, the chapel held mass on Memorial Day and All Souls Day until 1950, when the building's deteriorating condition made this impractical.

Archbishop Henni donated 3 acres (1.2 ha) of land across Bluemound Road to the Order of Friars Minor Capuchin on September 9, 1879, for a monastery and church. In exchange, they were to perform funeral services at the cemetery when parish priests were unable to attend. The cornerstone for Holy Cross Church (now St. Vincent Pallotti East) was placed on October 26, 1879, and dedicated on April 20, 1880. The order blessed the cemetery on All Saints Day.

On May 18, 2006, a construction worker unearthed human remains in the area believed to be the location of the Old Cemetery near 22nd and Michigan streets. Thirteen burials have since been identified, and archaeologists are unsure if they are remnants from the cemetery or an earlier burial site used by a Potawatomi village.

== Notable interments ==
Calvary Cemetery contains interments of some of the approximately 430 people who died with the sinking of the Lady Elgin on Lake Michigan in 1860. Most of those lost in the tragedy were from Milwaukee's Third Ward Irish community and is the second greatest loss of life seen on the Great Lakes.

- John Black, 24th mayor of Milwaukee, member of the Wisconsin State Assembly and Senate
- Erhard Brielmaier, noted architect who also designed the Basilica of St. Josaphat
- William J. Cary, U.S. representative, Milwaukee sheriff and county clerk.
- Patrick Cudahy, industrialist and founder of the Patrick Cudahy meat packing company
- Peter Deuster, elected to the Wisconsin State Assembly, Wisconsin State Senate, and U.S. House of Representatives
- Patrick Drew, served in the Wisconsin State Legislature
- Adrian Hoecken, Dutch Jesuit missionary among the Native Americans
- Robert A. Johnston, founder of the American Biscuit Company, a precursor to Nabisco
- Solomon Juneau, co-founder of the City of Milwaukee and its first mayor
- Philipp Jung, early brewer whose business was acquired by Pabst Brewing Company
- Henry Killilea, attorney and professional baseball team owner. One of the founders of the American League.
- Matthew Keenan, local politician who helped to establish the Old Soldiers' Home
- Edward Keogh, 37th speaker of the Wisconsin State Assembly, represented Milwaukee in the Assembly for 13 terms.
- John Luick, founder of the Luick Ice Cream company
- Frederick Miller, founder of the Miller Brewing Company
- Charles Reynolds, Wisconsin state legislator
- Casper Sanger, businessman and representative in the Wisconsin Legislature
- Joseph F. Smart, business manager for the 1903 Boston Americans, member of the Wisconsin State Assembly
- William H. Timlin, justice of the Wisconsin Supreme Court
- George Weissleder, elected to the Wisconsin State Senate and the Wisconsin State Assembly
- Joseph Anthony Murphy, Jesuit Priest, Titular Bishop of Birtha, and Dean of College of Arts and Sciences at Marquette University

== See also ==
- List of Milwaukeeans
- List of mayors of Milwaukee

== Sources ==
- Calvary Cemetery
- List of notable people at Calvary (PDF)
- Historic Preservation Commission Study (PDF)
