= Gustav Heine =

Gustav Heine may refer to:

- Gustav Heine von Geldern (1812–1886), German-Austrian publicist
- Gustav Otto Ludolf Heine (1868–1959), owner of Heine Piano Company
