= Joseph F. Smart =

American politician (1870–1938)

Member of the Wisconsin State Assembly from the Milwaukee 18th district
- In office January 6, 1913 – January 4, 1915
- Preceded by: district established
- Succeeded by: Frank L. Prescott

Personal details
- Born: January 14, 1870 Cleveland, Ohio, U.S.
- Died: April 1, 1938 (aged 68) Milwaukee, Wisconsin, U.S.
- Resting place: Calvary Cemetery, Milwaukee
- Party: Democratic
- Spouse: Esther Butler (m. 1897–1938)
- Children: Ann Butler (Blommer) (b. 1911; died 1976)

Joseph F. Smart (January 14, 1870 – April 1, 1938) was an American businessman and politician who was business manager of the Boston Red Sox during the 1903 season. Later, he was a member of the Wisconsin State Assembly, elected as a Democrat, representing northern Milwaukee County during the 51st Wisconsin Legislature (1913).

== Early life ==
Smart was born in Cleveland, Ohio, on January 14, 1870. He eventually moved to Milwaukee, where he worked in sales for the Great Northern Life Insurance Company of Wausau and the Valentin Blatz Brewing Company.

== Boston Red Sox ==
In April 1903, Smart was appointed business manager of Boston's American League baseball club (now known as the Boston Red Sox) by team president Henry Killilea. He was hired after University of Michigan athletic director Charles A. Baird turned down the job. During his tenure with the team, Smart oversaw improvements to the Huntington Avenue Grounds and brokered an agreement between Killilea and the players that led to the players agreeing to participate in the first ever World Series. Smart was not brought back for the 1904 season.

== Wisconsin State Assembly ==
In 1912, Smart was elected to the Wisconsin State Assembly from Milwaukee County's 18th Assembly district. The district then consisted of the eighteenth ward of the city of Milwaukee, the towns of Granville and Milwaukee, and the villages of Whitefish Bay and East Milwaukee; roughly comprising the northern quarter of Milwaukee County. A Democrat, he defeated Republican Frank Mackut Jr., 1,970 votes to 1,202. During his one term in the Assembly, Smart was a member of the insurance and banking committee.

== Later life ==
Smart spent a number of years in Buffalo, New York, before returning to Milwaukee in 1936. He died there on April 1, 1938.
