= Wollert (surname) =

Wollert is a surname. Notable people with the surname include:

- Carl Wollert (1877–1953), Swedish sports shooter
- Edward Wollert (1895–1964), American World War I veteran
- Heide Wollert (born 1982), German judoka

== See also ==
- Wollert (given name)
