= De Rance Foundation =

Catholic charity (1946–92)

The De Rance Foundation was the world's largest Catholic charity until its dissolution in 1992. It was named for Armand Jean le Bouthillier de Rancé, the 17th-century abbot of the monastery at La Trappe, France.

Begun in 1946 by Harry G. John, a grandson of Miller Brewing Company founder Frederick Miller, De Rance was worth $188 million in March 1983. By October 1984, the charity's value plummeted to $83 million as a result of Harry John's questionable expenditures and investments of its assets. John's wife, Erica, and Dr. Donald Gallagher, two of the three foundation directors, subsequently sued to have John removed as a De Rance director. They claimed he was spending too much on a major television venture based at KIHS-TV in Ontario, California. Harry John was found guilty of gross mismanagement and was permanently removed by a judge from the De Rance board in August 1986.

After Harry John died in December 1992, the De Rance board voted to award $30 million of the charity's $100 million in assets to several of John's favorite causes and then dissolved in order to prevent assets from being transmitted to Southern Cross Inc., a conservative Catholic agency. The remainder, $70 million, was used to create a new charitable organization, the Archdiocese of Milwaukee Supporting Fund. The fund was further renamed in 2009 as the Erica P. John Fund and reportedly contributes around $600,000 annually to the archdiocese. The fund was involved in leading a class action suit, Erica P. John Fund, Inc. v. Halliburton Co., at the Supreme Court of the United States in June 2011.
