= Harry G. John =

American philanthropist

Harry G. John, Jr. (1919–1992) was an American philanthropist, founder of the De Rance Foundation and heir to the Miller Brewing Company fortune through his grandfather, founder Frederick Miller.

== Early years ==
Born in Milwaukee, Wisconsin. John's mother, Elise Miller John, was one of two daughters of brewery founder Frederick Miller. He graduated from the University of Notre Dame in 1941 and was president of Miller Brewing from 1946 to 1947, succeeded by his cousin Fred Miller (1906–1954). John married Erica Nowotny in 1956 and the couple had nine children.

As a young man, John funded leprosariums in India and camps for Milwaukee inner-city blacks. He donated money to dig wells in drought-stricken West Africa and provided seminary training in the Philippines.

== De Rance Foundation ==
In the early 1950s, Harry G. John, a devout Catholic, utilized his inheritance - Miller stock valued at $14 million - to found the De Rance Foundation, which he named after Armand Jean le Bouthillier de Rance, the 17th century abbot of the monastery at La Trappe, France. In 1972, Philip Morris through the broker Kidder Peabody, bought Miller Brewing, resulting in the value of John's stock soaring to $97 million overnight. The De Rance Foundation thus became the world's largest Catholic charity. Harry distributed 10% of his profits to the Roman Catholic Church from De Rance each year.

== Lawsuit ==
In 1984, Erica John and Donald Gallagher, both De Rance directors, became alarmed at Harry John's increasingly extravagant expenditure of De Rance assets on such things as entire television stations (for which John envisioned a 24-hour-a-day Catholic broadcast network), treasure hunts for sunken ships, and risky investments in gold futures and junk bonds. Mrs. John and Gallagher filed a lawsuit along with attorney Tom Cannon in Milwaukee County Circuit Court to have Harry John removed as a De Rance director. After a five-month trial, on August 21, 1986, Judge Michael Barron announced that the plaintiffs had proven their allegations. Harry John was permanently removed from the De Rance board; he divorced Erica, and moved to Pacific Palisades, California where he resided for the next six years, returning to Milwaukee in 1992.

== Santa Fe Communications ==
Harry John's Santa Fe Communications managed the newly acquired television stations into a television network that combined secular programming and Catholic programming. The sale of the television stations, combined with various legal settlements, brought the De Rance Foundation back to where it was before the Catholic television network venture.

In a new format and in the age of cable television, the Santa Fe Communications presently produces and distributes Heart of the Nation, a Sunday Catholic Mass broadcast on various cable networks, on streaming services such as Youtube, as well as online. It assists those with disabilities who are unable to go to church.

The first broadcast was from Los Angeles, on Palm Sunday, 1984. It presently reaches 156 television markets (2023). It broadcasts the Catholic Mass on the Family Entertainment Television and the Family Movie Classics television networks as well as on GetTV, World Harvest Television networks, and more than 100 of The CW channels. Heart of the Nation, the Catholic media ministry of Santa Fe Communications, is based in Milwaukee, Wisconsin.

== Death ==
On December 14, 1992, John was found unconscious on the floor of his apartment by a neighbor. Tom Cannon called an emergency meeting of the De Rance board, which voted to dissolve the De Rance Foundation after awarding $30 million in grants to some of John's favorite causes. The remaining $70 million was used to create a new charitable organization, the Archdiocese of Milwaukee Supporting Fund. During the court proceedings, Cannon, addressing John's wild spending, asked John whether De Rance could spend itself out of existence. Harry answered: "I think the directors could give away 100 percent of the foundation with complete propriety."

John died on December 19, 1992.

== Southern Cross ==
In 1985, John prepared a legal document that would authorize the transfer of De Rance's assets to another organization he had created, Southern Cross, Inc., upon his death. In 1993, Southern Cross filed suit in Milwaukee, challenging the Archdiocese of Milwaukee Supporting Fund's receipt of the bulk of John's fortune after his death the previous year. In particular, they alleged that John was kept alive artificially until his family could dispose of De Rance's assets. "The suit is frivolous," said Cannon, "and is a last-minute effort by John's cronies to wrest control of the assets." On November 15, 1993, the suit was dismissed by Circuit Court Russell J. Stamper.

== Sources ==
- National Catholic Reporter, Vol. 29, No. 40: September 17, 1993.
- The Milwaukee Journal, 12/20/92, 11/15/93.
- John v. John, 153 Wis.2d 343, 450 N.W.2nd 795 (Ct.App. 1989)
