= Otto A. Paulsen =

American politician

Otto A. Paulsen (March 29, 1875 – August 13, 1957) was an American politician.

Paulsen was born in Milwaukee, Wisconsin and then moved with his parents in 1879 to a farm in Steen, Rock County, Minnesota. He lived with his wife and family in Steen, Minnesota and was a farmer. Paulsen served on the Rock County Commission, on the Sheen School Board, and on the Sheen Town Board. He then served in the Minnesota House of Representatives from 1935 to 1938.
