= Alice Holz =

American union organizer (1912–1990)

Alice Holz (December 8, 1912 – January 18, 1990) was an American union organizer. She was involved in the foundation of the Office Employees International Union (OPEIU) and served as one of the union's first regional vice presidents.

== Early life ==
Holz was born on December 8, 1912, in Milwaukee, Wisconsin. Her parents were Christian Holz, a barber, and Alma Holz. Christian was a member of the Socialist Party who was a conscientious objector during World War I and an unsuccessful candidate for the Milwaukee City Council. Holz and her younger brother, Marvin, assisted in canvassing and met socialists and labor unionists from across the country and Europe who travelled to visit their father. She attended West Division High School, where she graduated in 1931 during the Great Depression and was unable to afford to go to college or to find work.

Holz began taking typing and shorthand courses at a local vocational school and began working part-time in circulation for the socialist newspaper, Milwaukee Leader. She later wrote about her time at the paper in an essay titled "Memories of the Milwaukee Leader" published in 1990. She became involved in socialist politics and union organizing while working at Brisbane Hall, befriending other activists including Maud McCreery. She worked as an assistant to McCreery in the women's division of the political party.

== Union organizing ==
On August 15, 1935, following the passage of the National Labor Relations Act of 1935, Holz joined Office Workers Local 16456 through her office work for the Socialist Party, which was affiliated with the American Federation of Labor (AFL). The union lobbied for her to get a job as secretary to the Truck Drivers Local 347, threatening to picket the truck drivers' union for saying they did not want to hire someone from an office workers' union but instead one of their employee's relatives, and she was ultimately hired. She collected and recorded dues, managed memberships, designed handbills and wrote articles for the union newsletter. The local was involved with raising money to release Tom Mooney and Warren Billings from jail in San Francisco.

Holz was elected as financial secretary of Local 16456 after being a member for a couple years and she lobbied for the union, which mostly covered employees of other labor organizations, to expand to represent commercial office workers. The union hired a female organizer and targeted an insurance company, however they faced resistance from employers and employees alike, particularly female workers who intended to marry and leave the workforce, and were ultimately unsuccessful in that campaign. However, during her time as the financial secretary, Miller Brewing Company, Valentin Blatz Brewing Company, the Transport Company, International Harvester and many local plants allowed their office workers to join the union. Holz focused on learning more about the movement, attending courses on collective bargaining, parliamentary procedure and labor history at the School for Workers at the University of Wisconsin–Extension in Madison and attending state AFL meetings.

=== Office Employees International Union ===
Holz became focused on founding an office workers’ council, which would begin the process for the creation of an international union. She led other office worker locals to petition the president of the AFL, William Green, to assist in establishing a council. Finally in 1942, Green established a conference in Detroit, Michigan, to allow office workers’ locals in the US and Canada to meet and discuss establishing a council. Holz was elected as a delegate and served on the by-laws committee. When the International Council was established, she was elected to the executive board and she was re-elected to a full term in 1943. The Office Employees International Union (OPEIU) was granted a charter by the AFL in January 1945 and Holz was elected as one of ten regional vice presidents. She was one of two female vice presidents, along with Mildred Erickson. She was appointed by Paul R. Hutchings as chairman of the convention arrangements committee to handle planning for the 1946 convention of the OPEIU which was held in Milwaukee. She received the largest vote of any candidate at the 1947 re-election, where Harold Beck was nominated from Milwaukee but declined the nomination to allow Holz to continue in the position.

=== Later union work ===
Holz left her position with the Local 347 and became secretary to the AFL regional director, working for David Sigman and Jacob Friedrick. She faced some hardships during her union career. She struggled with the requirement to declare a loyalty oath, as primary officers of labor unions had to state that they were not Communists. She personally opposed the obligation but ultimately signed, to prevent the government from blocking union elections. She also faced discrimination as a woman, being denied a scholarship to a labor school in the 1930s and never being offered a staff position in any trade union.

She did not run for re-election as vice president of the OPEIU after her second term and in 1952, she resigned as financial secretary of Local 16456 (which became the Professional Employees International Union Local 9 following the establishment of the OPEIU), and left the AFL regional office. She began working for the Brewery Workers Local 9 and then joined the Teamsters Local 344 as the office manager, a position that she held until retiring in 1978. She was a secretary of the Milwaukee chapter of the Women's Trade Union League from 1949 and along with Eleanor Raasch, she was involved with rebooting the chapter between 1948 and 1949. Holz also served as the recording secretary of the Public Enterprise Committee, which was founded by Frank Zeidler. She set up the health, welfare and pension departments of the Local 344. She presented at the Wisconsin Labor History Society's annual conference in April 1985 on her work with the Milwaukee Leader.

== Death and legacy ==
Holz died in 1990, aged 77.

She was interviewed by the Women of Wisconsin Labor Oral History Project for Like Our Sisters Before Us: Women of Wisconsin Labor, a book which was published in 1998 for the state's sesquicentennial celebration.
