= Deb Hoffmann =

American toy collector

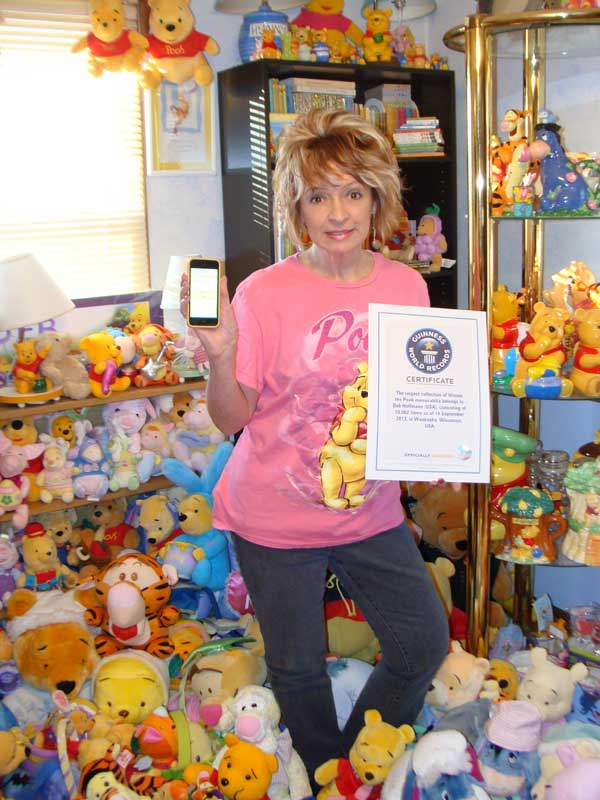
- Deb Hoffmann, February 2014
- Born: March 27, 1965 (age 61); Milwaukee, Wisconsin
- Occupations: Website Designer; Collector; Winnie-the-Pooh "ambassador" Auction Website Owner
- Website: http://mostpooh.com

Deb Hoffmann (born March 27, 1965) who resides in Waukesha, Wisconsin is recognized by Guinness World Records as the having the Largest Winnie-the-Pooh and Friends Memorabilia Collection.

In 2008 Hoffmann submitted her collection for adjudication to Guinness World Records and on January 17 received her first certificate for a collection totaling 3,891 unique items. The collection consists of items including clothes, jackets, watches, clocks, figurines, dishes, mugs, toys and plush stuffed characters. One plush in particular, a pre-Disney Piglet, was purchased from Victoria Price, the daughter of actor Vincent Price.

In deciding to keep her record current each year and because Guinness World Records only acknowledges uniquely different items, her husband Gary created a database and app which Hoffmann uses to catalog her collection.

== Biography ==
As a child Deb Hoffmann lived in Milwaukee, Wisconsin. She remembers always having had an affinity for Winnie the Pooh receiving her first stuffed plush Pooh when she was two years old. It wasn't until her twenties when the collection started to take on size.

In 1987 Deb married her college sweetheart, Gary. She many times refers to him as, "the best part of her collecting". Gary has not only supported Deb with her collecting but has also encouraged her and aided in her never ending search for unique items.

Besides the passion for Winnie the Pooh, Hoffmann has always been involved in activities that brought people together. Her first job after graduating from Carroll University (then Carroll College) in 1987 was running the marketing department for an insurance company where she developed programs to help agents locate new customers. After several years she then took that experience and went to work for an advertising agency in Pewaukee, Wisconsin where she honed her ability to develop marketing programs to promote businesses.

With technology becoming more prominent in companies, Hoffmann felt she needed to gain experience with computers and went to work for a variety of software companies.

Hoffmann always wanted to start her own company with her husband who was a software engineer. In 2000, with the increased use of websites, the Hoffmanns joined their strengths of marketing and technology together and formed TechAnalysts, Inc. a custom software and website design company. They also started a mobile DJ company, A Special Request.

Hoffmann volunteered to play Winnie the Pooh for Sears and Roebuck, who at the time, had a licensing agreement with Disney to sell Winnie the Pooh merchandise.

In 2009 she created a business networking organization called BIG Networking (Business Introduction Group) a non-dues business referral organization.

In 1999 Hoffmann ventured to White River, Canada to attend Winnie's Hometown Festival.White River is the town in which Lt Harry Colebourn purchased a female black bear cub that would go on to become the inspiration for A.A. Milne's Winnie the Pooh stories. The Hoffmanns have returned to the festival each year since. When the festival committee learned that Hoffmann was the Guinness World Record holder for Pooh and Friends Memorabilia and that she and Gary owned A Special Request, they asked her to become the emcee of the festival. As continued support to the town "Where It All Began", Hoffmann has donated several Winnie the Pooh items to the White River Heritage Museum.

Over the years, Hoffmann has been contacted by several media outlets to talk about her Guinness World Record collection including the show My Crazy Obsession.Due to scheduling conflicts, she never appeared on the show, but it prompted her to create the website MostPooh.com which showcases her collection and is an outlet for Winnie the Pooh enthusiasts to share their stories. Because the website gives Pooh fans and collectors the ability to communicate with Hoffmann, she receives emails every day from people looking to either sell their Pooh collectibles or find specific Pooh items to add to their collection. This led to her creating cartoonfreakboutique.com, a niche auction website for collectors of Pooh and cartoon memorabilia. Cartoonfreakboutique.com can also be used as a tool for non-profit organizations to raise money.

In 2015 Hoffmann followed a dream of participating in the World Pooh Sticks Championships. Pooh Sticks is based on a story in A.A. Milne's The House at Pooh Corner. The event, run by the Rotary of Oxford Spires,moved to a new location at Cogges Manor Farm in Witney to accommodate the growing number of people participating in the contest. It is a fundraiser for the Rotary with proceeds going to charity.

At the Championships several media outlets, including the BBC Radio in Oxford, That's Oxford TV, Oxford Mail and The Independent interviewed Hoffmann because she made the almost 4000 mile trip to attend the festivities.

Hoffmann has also been recognized by RecordSetter, formerly known as Universal Record Database, as having the record for the Most "Winnie the Pooh and Friends" Shirts And Jackets In A Backyard.

Because of all the Winnie-the-Pooh fans around the world asking to see Hoffmann's collection, Deb launched a YouTube video series called "Never Enough...Pooh" to showcase her collection. The video series can be found on Hoffmann's YouTube Channel MostPooh5150.

Deb and her Winnie the Pooh collection was featured on the MeTV series Collector's Call hosted by Lisa Whelchel, Blair, from the 80s TV series The Facts of Life (TV series). Deb now appears on IMDB as well.

== Records by date ==
| Date | Record Achieved |
|---|---|
| January 15, 2008 | Official Guinness World Record - 3,891 unique items |
| February 23, 2009 | Official Guinness World Record - 4,405 unique items |
| May 1, 2010 | Official Guinness World Record - 4,805 unique items |
| July 15, 2011 | Official Guinness World Record - 5,150 unique items |
| August 23, 2012 | Official Guinness World Record - 7,777 unique items |
| September 14, 2013 | Official Guinness World Record - 10,002 unique items |
| September 21, 2014 | Official Guinness World Record - 11,485 unique items |
| October 18, 2015 | Official Guinness World Record - 13,213 unique items |
| July 15, 2015 | Official RecordSetter Record – Most Winnie the Pooh and Friends Shirts and Jackets in a Backyard – 548 unique items |
| March 23, 2017 | Featured in Guinness World Records Blockbuster Book |
| April 8, 2017 | Official Guinness World Record - 14,314 unique items |
| December 20, 2020 | Official Guinness World Record - 20,000 unique items |
| February 23, 2023 | Official Guinness World Record - 23,623 unique items |
