= Wollert (given name) =

Wollert is a given name. Notable people with the given name include:

- Wollert Keilhau (1894–1958), Norwegian librarian and encyclopedist
- Wollert Konow (merchant) (1779–1839), Norwegian merchant and politician
- Wollert Konow (Prime Minister of Norway) (1845–1924), Norwegian politician
- Wollert Konow (Hedemarken politician) (1847–1932), Norwegian politician
- Wollert Krohn-Hansen (1889—1973), Norwegian theologian and pastor
- Wollert Nygren (1906–1988), Norwegian speed skater

== See also ==
- Wollert (surname)
