= Sandy MacKay =

American politician

Alexander M. MacKay (January 13, 1881 – December 9, 1952) was a politician in the State of Michigan.

== Biography ==
MacKay was born Alexander MacKay on January 13, 1881 in Milwaukee, Wisconsin. In 1901 he married Cora E. Winslow, who died in 1919. On July 7, 1924 he married Anna Bowman. MacKay was Episcopalian and was known to be a member of Freemasonry, the Independent Order of Odd Fellows, and the Knights of Pythias. He died on December 9, 1952.

== Career ==
MacKay served in the Michigan State House of Representatives from 1937 to 1952. He was a Republican. He was a jeweler and a postmaster by trade.
