= Fred Miller (American football, born 1906) =

American football player (1906–1954)

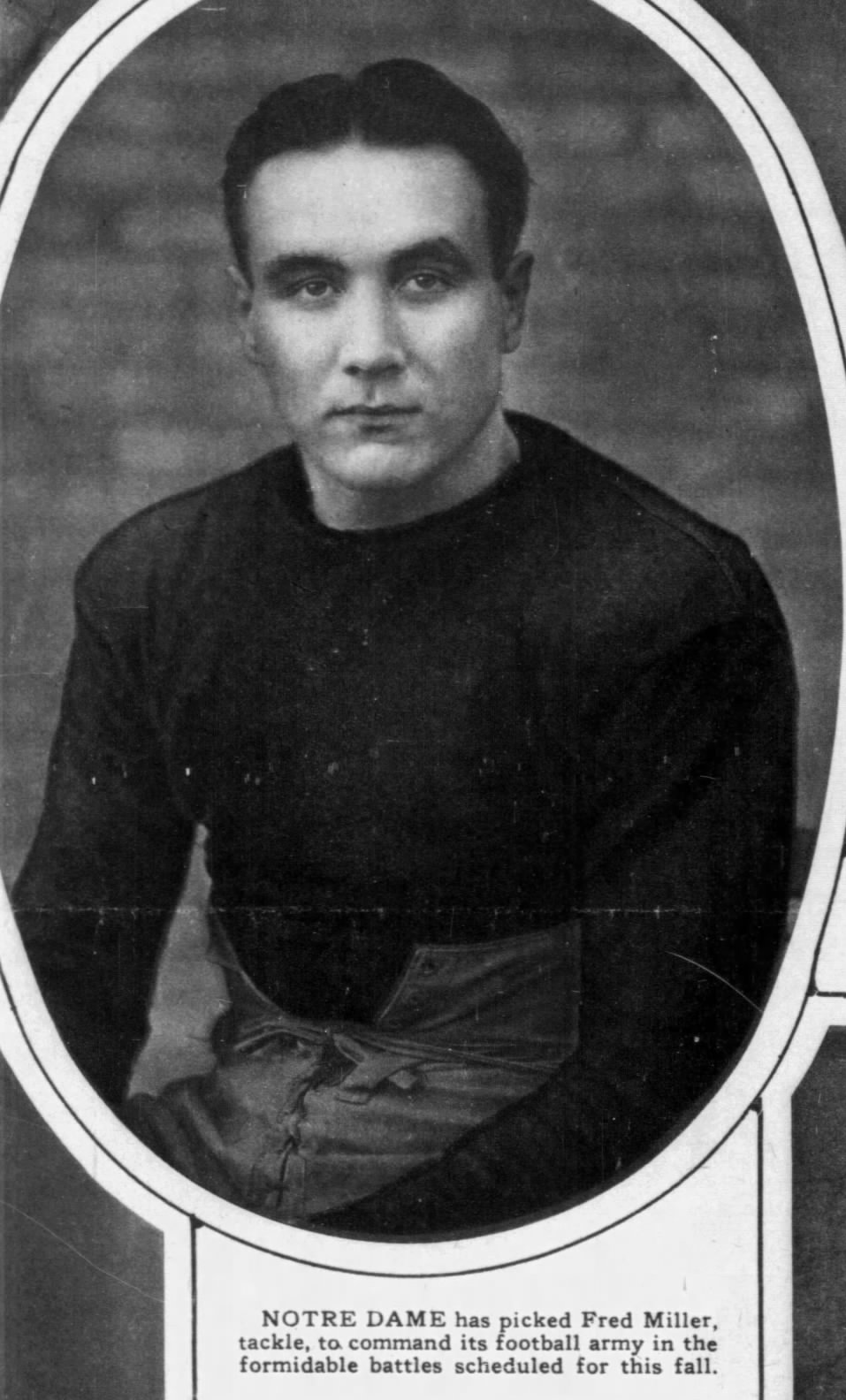

Profile
- Position: Tackle

Personal information
- Born: January 26, 1906; Milwaukee, Wisconsin, U.S.
- Died: December 17, 1954 (aged 48); Milwaukee, Wisconsin, U.S.
- Listed height: 6 ft 1 in (1.85 m)
- Listed weight: 195 lb (88 kg)

Career information
- College: University of Notre Dame, B.A. 1929
- College Football Hall of Fame

Frederick C. Miller (January 26, 1906 – December 17, 1954) was a college football player, an All-American tackle under head coach Knute Rockne at the University of Notre Dame, posthumously elected to the College Football Hall of Fame in 1985. He later served as an unpaid assistant coach for the Irish, flying in from Milwaukee several times a week.

Born in Milwaukee, Wisconsin, Miller was the son of Carl A. Miller of Germany, and Clara Miller (no relation), a daughter of Miller Brewing Company founder Frederick Miller, also a German immigrant.

Succeeding his younger cousin Harry John (1919–1992), Miller became the president of the family brewing company in 1947 at age 41 and had a major role in bringing Major League Baseball to Wisconsin, moving the Braves from Boston to Milwaukee in 1953. He coaxed Lou Perini into moving them into the new County Stadium and was made a director for the team. The Braves later played in consecutive World Series in 1957 and 1958, both against the New York Yankees. Both series went the full seven games with Milwaukee winning the former and New York the latter. Many close to Miller believe that if not for Miller's early death, that when Perini later sold the Braves in the early 1960s, Miller would have bought the team to keep them in Milwaukee.

== Death ==
The father of two sons and six daughters, Miller was killed in a plane crash at age 48 on December 17, 1954, while on the way to a hunting trip in Portage la Prairie, Manitoba. The company plane, a converted twin-engine Lockheed Ventura that was bound for Winnipeg’s airport on a Friday evening, had trouble with both engines and crashed shortly after takeoff from Mitchell Field in Milwaukee. Also killed were his oldest son, 20-year-old Fred, Jr., and the two company pilots, Joseph and Paul Laird. The Monday funeral for the Millers at Gesu Church was attended by thousands.
