= Casey Loomis =

Recipient of the Navy Cross

Casey Loomis served in the United States Marine Corps during World War I. He would be awarded the Navy Cross, the Distinguished Service Cross, and the Silver Star.

His Navy Cross citation reads:

The President of the United States of America takes pleasure in presenting the Navy Cross to Corporal Casey V. Loomis (MCSN: 83869), United States Marine Corps, for extraordinary heroism while serving with the 73d Company, 6th Regiment (Marines), 2d Division, A.E.F. in action near Thiaucourt, France, 15 September 1918. During an enemy counterattack Corporal Loomis voluntarily left a sheltered position, and, in entire disregard of his own safety, set up his gun in the open under heavy enemy fire. By securing enfilading fire on the advancing enemy, he broke up the counterattack within one hundred yards of our line.

His Distinguished Service Cross citation reads:

The President of the United States of America, authorized by Act of Congress, July 9, 1918, takes pleasure in presenting the Distinguished Service Cross to Corporal Casey V. Loomis (MCSN: 83869), United States Marine Corps, for extraordinary heroism while serving with the Seventy-Third Company, Sixth Regiment (Marines), 2d Division, A.E.F., in action near Thiaucourt, France, 15 September 1918. During an enemy counterattack Corporal Loomis voluntarily left a sheltered position, and, in entire disregard of his own safety, set up his gun in the open under heavy enemy fire. By securing enfilading fire on the advancing enemy, he broke up the counterattack within one hundred yards of our line.

His Silver Star citation reads:

By direction of the President, under the provisions of the act of Congress approved July 9, 1918 (Bul. No. 43, W.D., 1918), Corporal Casey V. Loomis (MCSN: 83869/120230), United States Marine Corps, is cited by the Commanding General, American Expeditionary Forces, for gallantry in action and a silver star may be placed upon the ribbon of the Victory Medals awarded him. Corporal Loomis distinguished himself by gallantry in action while serving with the 73d Company, 6th Regiment (Marines), 2d Division, American Expeditionary Forces, in action in Champagne Sector, French front, on 8 October 1918, north of St. Etienne, in inflicting heavy casualties on advancing enemy during counter-attack.

Loomis was born in Walhalla, North Dakota, his official residence was listed as Milwaukee, Wisconsin.
