= Karl F. Nystrom =

American rail engineer

Karl Fritjof Nystrom (1881–1961) was an American rail engineer who introduced a number of important innovations, including welded lightweight freight and passenger railcars. He is probably best known for his work designing and building the Hiawatha trains for the Milwaukee Road.

== Early career ==
Karl Fritjof Nystrom was born in Aspa bruk, Sweden, in 1881. He graduated in 1904 as a mechanical engineer from the Mining School at Filipstad. To pay for his education he worked summer jobs in machine shops in Stockholm and in steel mills in other parts of the country. Following graduation he went to Germany to study high tensile steel, but before finishing his studies he decided to seek employment in Pittsburgh, the center of the US steel industry. He worked as a 'blueprint boy' and then as an engineer at the Midland Steel Company, before obtaining employment for Pressed Steel Car Company as a draftsman.

His work at Pressed Steel Car apparently caused Nystrom to decide to focus his career on railcar design and manufacture. It appears that he may have decided to leave Pressed Steel during the Pressed Steel Car strike of 1909, because he joined Pullman in the later part of that year, where he was co-designer of the first steel sleeping car. He also established the specifications for the first all-steel railway post office car. He moved through a fairly rapid succession of railcar jobs, working for the Southern Pacific during the electrification of its Oakland-Alameda line, where he designed and built their first electric interurban cars, for the American Car & Foundry Company, for the Acme Supply Company, for the Grand Trunk (the Canadian National) and for the Canadian Pacific.

== Milwaukee Road ==
In 1922, Nystrom was appointed engineer of car design for the Milwaukee Road – and worked there for the rest of his career. He quickly rose through the ranks, eventually becoming chief mechanical officer of the company. Nystrom had close to 100 patents to his credit.

He was an innovator in many aspects of railcar design, but his principal distinction was the development of welded lightweight freight and passenger railcars, for his design of car wheel assemblies (trucks) for passenger railcars which were considered the smoothest riding in the industry, and for the cars for the Hiawatha trails where he played a leading role in designing the well-known bay window cabooses. He also perfected steam jet air conditioning for passenger cars.

By employing high-tensile steels in an all-welded design, the Milwaukee Road was able to achieve significant reductions in weight – some of their railcars were as much as 4.5 tons lighter than similar cars of the riveted construction.

== Other activities ==
Nystrom served for several years on the board of supervisors of Marquette University, where in recognition of distinctive work he received an honorary PhD in mechanical engineering from that university in 1941. He was a consultant for the War Department Transportation Corps and a member of the War Production Board. In 1945 he was elected a Fellow in the American Society of Mechanical Engineers – only about one percent of ASME members are elected to the grade of Fellow. He retired on January 31, 1949, and died on June 5, 1961.
