= Heine-Velox =

American automobile manufacturer (1905-08)

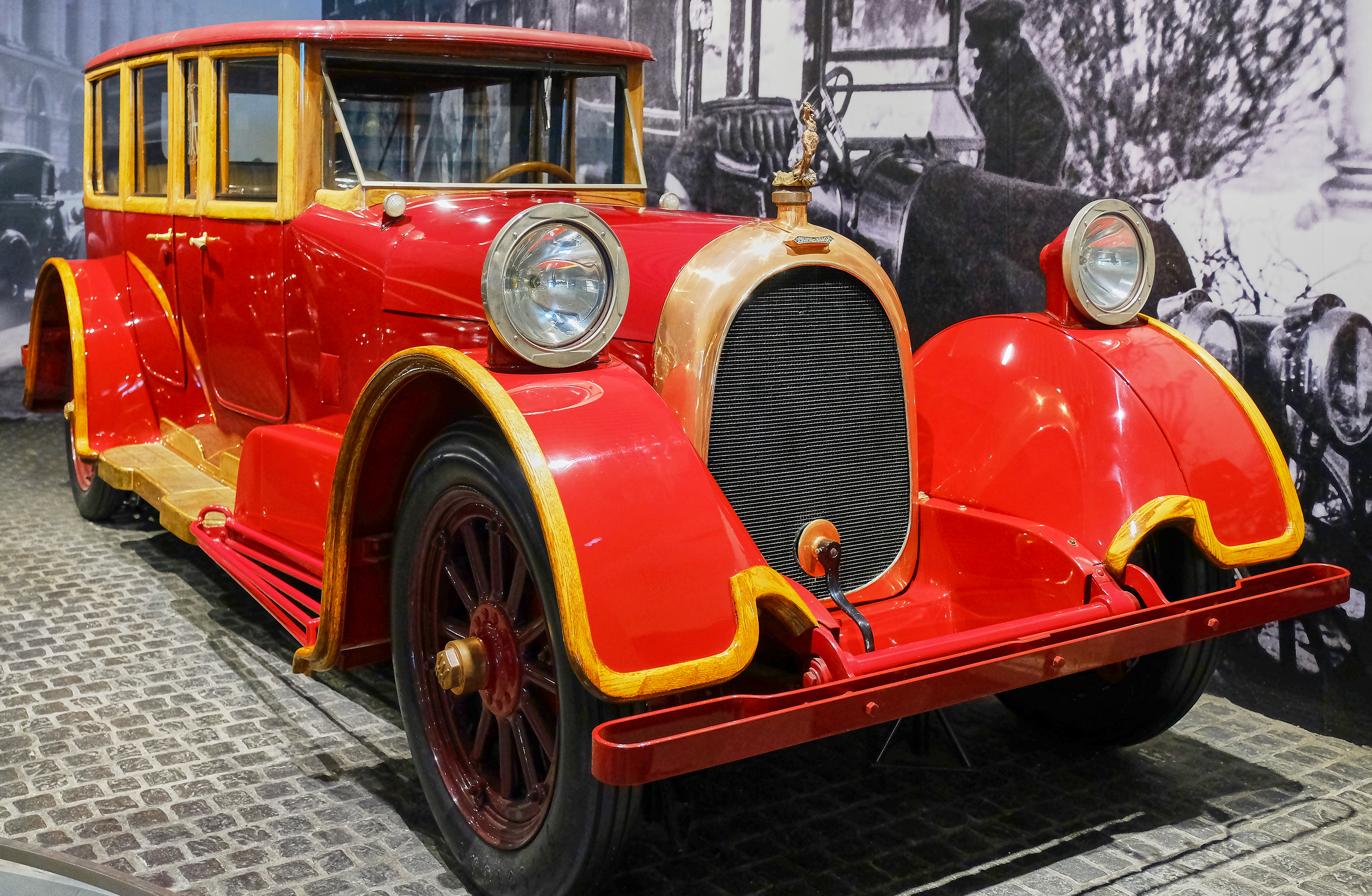

Heine-Velox was a large, expensive luxury car made by Gustav Heine. Heine Piano Company was originally Bruenn Piano Company before Heine became owner. All were based in San Francisco.

== Piano business ==
Gustav Otto Ludolf Heine was born near Boizenburg, Germany, in 1868, and emigrated to the United States in 1873 with his parents and seven siblings, settling in the Capay Valley. At the age of 16, he moved to San Francisco and went to work for Bruenn Piano Company. Heine became a piano tuner, but did not get along well with the owner of the firm. After much conflict, and a scar from dueling Bruenn with tuning hammers, Heine emerged owner of Bruenn Piano Company, changing the name of the firm to Heine Piano Company.

== Automobile interest ==
In 1903, Heine became interested in automobiles and had one of the first Ford dealerships in the west coast. The next year, he met Colonel E. J. Hall (of the Hall-Scott Motor Company), who designed engines for Heine with hill climbing units. Starting in 1905, Hall worked for Heine as works driver, repairman, chauffeur, salesman, and general partner for two and a half years. Heine built three tourers before the 1906 San Francisco earthquake and fire, which destroyed the Heine Motor Company and Heine Piano Company. Following the earthquake, Heine restarted the piano business, and offered federal troops the use of his tourer for transporting supplies, the wounded, and the dead.

Heine left after the earthquake for Milwaukee, where he arranged a deal to have a large number of vehicles produced under the Heine-Velox name. The new vehicles would then be sold by the Heine Motor Car Company, located on Golden Gate Avenue in San Francisco. The vehicles would be manufactured by Mauvais Motor Company, owned by Roy Mauvais. In 1906, the 45 H.P. was produced. Backed by a $5,000 guarantee, the car was advertised as having fewer parts in relation to its size and weight than any other car.

In February 1907, Heine was in negotiations to have one of his vehicles raced against a Fiat vehicle that was one of the fastest being manufactured at that time. The proposed race was cancelled when Fiat officials wanted to add a third vehicle into the race. Heine's planned production of 50 cars per year never came to fruition, and he ended automobile production in 1908.

=== Revitalized ===
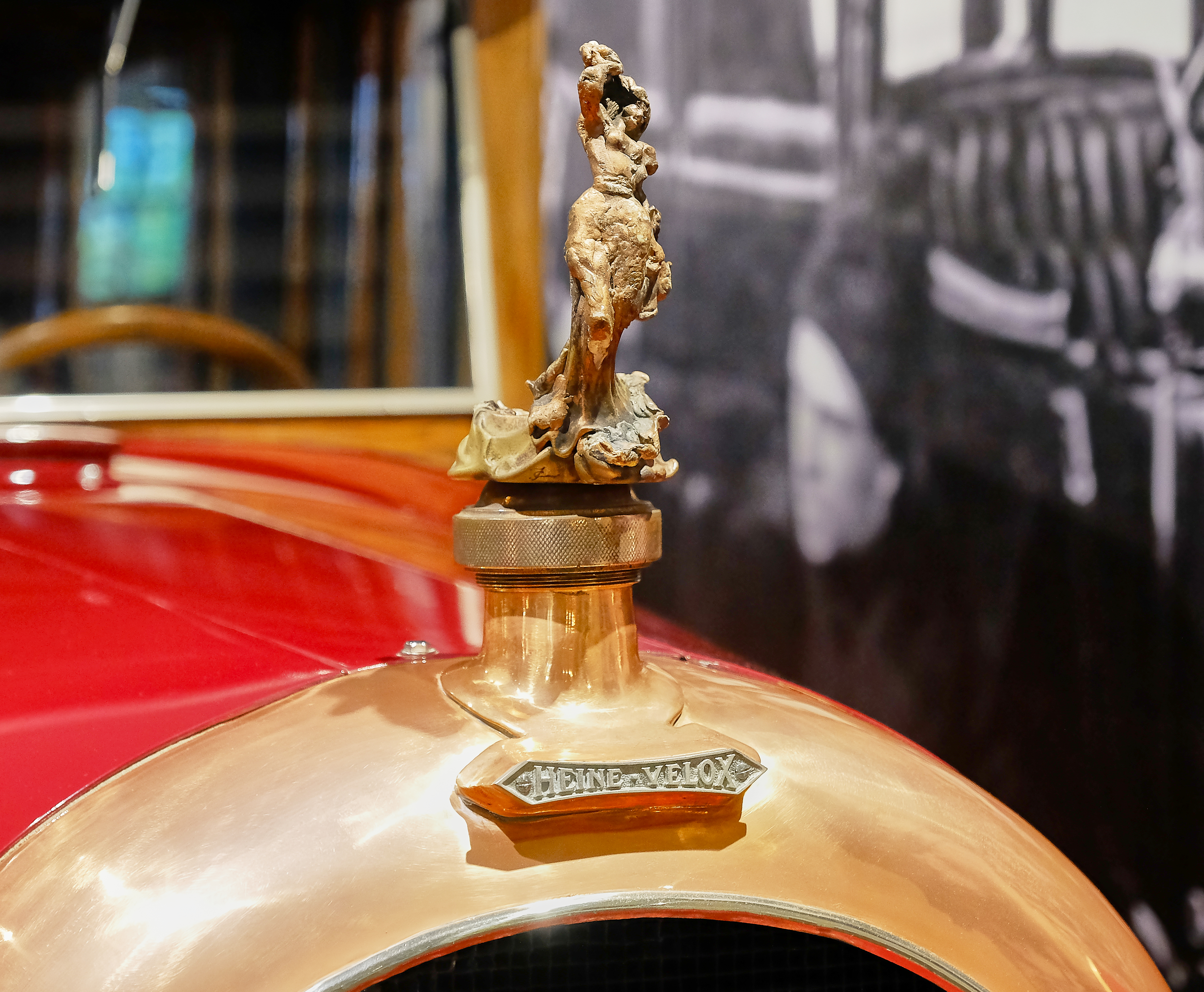
Heine-Velox Mascot

In 1921, after Heine had purchased Economy Steel Manufacturing Company, he had a new car designed and built with resources from the acquired company. The 1921 Heine-Velox, advertised as a custom-built luxury car, was first shown at a San Francisco auto show. The car had hydraulic brakes on all wheels, and a V-12 engine commissioned from the Weidely Motor Company. It was one of only a few vehicles manufactured after 1919 to use a V-12 engine, which was not widely reintroduced until the early 1930s.

It was massive, with a 148-inch (3,800 mm) wheelbase. The price tag of $17,000-$25,000 made it the most expensive American car of the era; a Rolls-Royce sold for less than $10,000, the most expensive Packard (a Twin Six Limousine) was $6,650 before options, American's highest-price model was $5,250, the Lozier Big Six limousines and landaulettes $6,500 (tourers and roadsters were $5,000), and the Lozier Light Six Metropolitan tourer and runabout bottomed at $3,250. By contrast, the high-volume Oldsmobile Runabout was $650 and Western's Gale Model A was $500.

The Heine-Velox V12 had a low-slung appearance because the body was mounted to the frame from the sides, instead of the top, which also provided more structural rigidity and a low center of gravity. The two headlights, mounted high on the fenders (giving a kind of bug-eyed look), contained both high and low beams, operated by a switch. Rather than roll up or down, Heine windows pivoted and could be locked in position. Luggage could be stored in lockable boxes on the running boards, as well as in places on all sides of the car. An easy to spot interior innovation was the tilting of the dashboard to 45 degrees, which was supposed to be more comfortable for the driver and would hide the steering column, as well as positioning of the handbrake and gear selector which did not require leaning. Heine demonstrated his car to Chevrolet and demanded to see the head engineer. He was pointed in his direction, leaving the car unattended, and the car was stolen. The following year Chevrolet released a car with pivoting windows. Heine's car had many other innovations, including an oil level automatically maintained by gravity, and a cold-weather start system operated from the dash. The Blackhawk Collection claims the cars were as powerful as the Duesenbergs of the day.

=== Post-automobile ===
In 1923, the company was dissolved after the Economy Steel Manufacturing Company closed. Gustav moved to southern California, where he enjoyed playing and composing for the piano, and purchasing cars for his own amusement, until his death in 1959. He spent his final years at his place in Sunol, California. His last three cars were lent to a local dealer for display, but he was never paid for them, and they disappeared.

Known cars built:

- 1906: three 45 horsepower, and cars offered in the San Francisco Automobile show 1907 and 1908
- 1921 and 1923: the Sporting Victoria, two sedans, and a limousine, all V12s.

The Victoria, formerly on display at the National Automobile Museum in Reno, Nevada, was owned by a New York collector as of 2005. The limousine and one of the sedans were in the Cars of the Stars collection from 1976 to 1980. Another sedan was given to Heine's sister's family in the 1930s, and eventually became a chicken coop, and then was abandoned. In 1978, the sedan was sold to a collector in Colorado, who still owned it as of 2005. Restorations on the limousine began in 1996, after it was sold to new owners. In 2005, the limousine was put on display at The Auto Collections at the Imperial Palace hotel-casino in Paradise, Nevada.

== See also ==
- List of automobile manufacturers
- List of defunct automobile manufacturers
