= Todd Temkin =

American poet (born 1964)

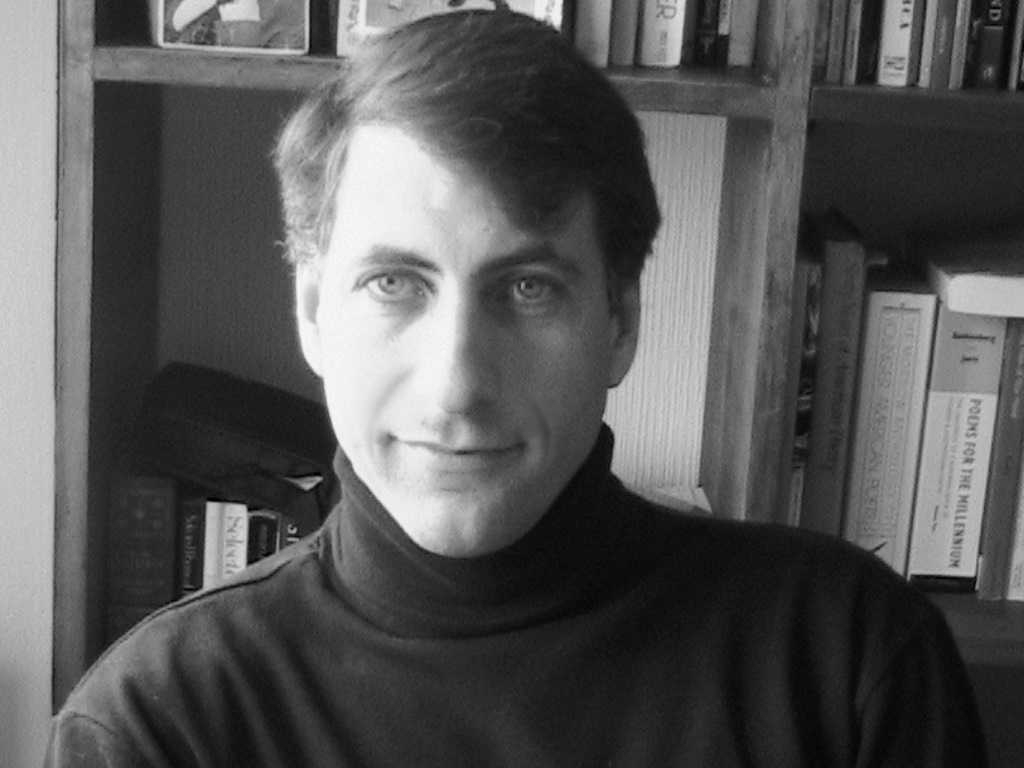
Todd Temkin

Todd Temkin (born 1964) is an American poet.

Born in Milwaukee, Wisconsin, Temkin has carved a niche as poet turned social entrepreneur and cultural activist. His poems are rich in humor, intimacy, and self-deprecating irony.

Temkin's poems startle the reader with "bursts of lucidity stripped bare of false poses and exaggerated gestures." In a recent documentary on Chilean television, Temkin stated: "We live our lives weighed down by the burden of names and labels that society bestows upon us. For me, a poem doesn't come alive until it sets us free from such burdens." Temkin's poems surprise us with their complex simplicity, breaking through the barriers that separate verse from oral speech."

Temkin is equally well known for his social activism in Chile, his adopted country, where he is said to have played an instrumental role in the transformation of Valparaíso into a major cultural center and UNESCO World Heritage Site. Much of Temkin's work on behalf of Valparaíso has come through the non-profit Valparaiso Foundation, which the poet created in 1998. He also writes a popular and influential Sunday column for El Mercurio de Valparaiso, Chile's oldest newspaper. In 2010, Mercurio Aguilar published a collection of Temkin's Sunday columns under the title "Moriré en Valparaíso" [Let me die in Valparaíso].

For his many contributions on behalf of the city, the mayor of Valparaíso conferred upon Todd Temkin the "Premio Juan Ross" for 2009 (Juana Ross Prize), the highest honor the city of Valparaíso can bestow upon a citizen or institution for their work on behalf of the city.

In the "Sunday Book Review" (El Mercurio), Chilean critic Matías Ayala writes: "Temkin moves with surprising range from joviality to elegy and back again, combining elements both absurd and profane to reveal a deeper illumination." Esteemed Chilean poet Ennio Moltedo has written, "Todd Temkin's poems clearly establish the difference between inhabiting by choice and inhabiting by obligation."

== University ==
Temkin is said to have been deeply transformed by the loss of a sister who died of melanoma when the poet was sixteen. He enrolled to study art history and psychology at Indiana University. Later he came of age as a poet under the tutelage of Pulitzer Prize winner Charles Simic. He received his M.A. in poetry writing at the University of Minnesota. Early poetic influences included James Wright, William Carlos Williams, Galway Kinnell, Philip Levine, and W.S. Merwin. In 1992, Temkin accepted an offer to teach North American literature at the Catholic University of Valparaíso, Chile.

== Chile ==
Once installed in Chile's historic port, Temkin taught, published poems, and became enraptured by the endearing chaos of Valparaíso. In 1998, the poet abandoned his academic post to create the Valparaiso Foundation, a non-profit organization dedicated to promoting the rebirth of Valparaíso as a cultural heritage site. From its earliest days, Temkin's foundation established an impressive list of accomplishments, winning grants and executing neighborhood redevelopment projects, all the time working to transform the movement on behalf of Valparaíso into a national campaign.

In recent years, Temkin's foundation has branched out into the administration of important cultural projects, teaming with noted film critic Alfredo Barrìa in the direction of the Valparaíso Film Festival and joining forces with Chilean mezzo-soprano Marìa Cecilia Toledo to direct a 15-day annual event known as "Opera by the Sea." Temkin is also said to be deeply involved in the restoration of one of Valparaíso's most important cultural venues, the Deutsches Haus Theater, in the Concepciòn National historic district of Valparaíso.

In 2002, the Chilean National Society of Architects named Todd Temkin "Honorary Architect" in recognition of his profound contributions to the restoration of Chile's National Heritage. In 2003, the historic quarter of Valparaíso was declared a UNESCO world heritage site. In August 2007, a thirty-minute documentary on Temkin's life and contributions to Chilean society aired on public television, produced by Channel 13 (Universidad Católica Televisión). The program was called, "La Huella de un Inmigrante," (An Immigrant's Imprint).

== Mixing poetry and politics ==
By the year 2003, the poet's tireless participation in the affairs of Valparaíso began to take a toll. Though greatly admired in political and professional circles—Temkin has twice been nominated "Person of the Year" by the newspaper El Mercurio de Valparaiso—some local activists openly questioned Temkin's excessive protagonism in all things related to Valparaíso.

Such jealousy reached a fever pitch when Chilean Secretary of State Soledad Alvear (1998–2004) invited Temkin to be the official guide for a delegation of 21 ambassadors who voted for Valparaíso in the UNESCO world heritage conference, infuriating some local officials who felt that such an honor should never have been bestowed upon a non-native, much less an American.

By 2004, Temkin found himself at a crossroads and began to hint openly in newspaper and radio interviews that he had painted himself into a corner and wished to get back to his writing. The 2005 publication of Enloquecidos Moradores de un Mundo Sin Quehacer is seen by some as a reconciliation between the poet and the civic activist. In his foreword to Crazy Denizens of the Lost World, Agustin Squella, cultural attaché to Chilean President Ricardo Lagos (1998–2004), wrote:

"When it comes to Todd Temkin, it seems unthinkable to separate the poet from the cultural activist from the man. I prefer to celebrate the activist, the cultural entrepreneur, the citizen, while thanking the man for taking the time to demonstrate the fine poet that he also is. The great Portuguese poet, Fernando Pessoa, once suggested that we are more than one person, that we are indeed a treasure chest of different people. Such an idea can find no better embodiment than the author of this book."

== Bibliography ==
Crazy Denizens of the Lost World (2005, University of Valparaíso Press)

Enloquecidos Moradores de un Mundo Sin Quehacer (2005, Editorial Universidad de Valparaíso)

Moriré en Valparaíso (2010, Mercurio Aguilar)

== Temkin's work ==
Temkin's poems have been celebrated for achieving a natural voice that avoids grandiosity and false posturing, often playfully poking fun at the poet's own expense. In "The Discovery of Love," Temkin extolls upon the virtues of physically induced love, only to deadpan several stanzas into the poem: "Later, she would dump me/ for a Kung Fu instructor/ canceling the wedding/ via U.S. mail."
