= Max Fernekes =

American painter and artist (1811–1885)

Maximillian (Max) Margius Fernekes
- Born: July 7, 1905; Milwaukee, Wisconsin, US
- Died: November 28, 1984 (aged 79); Lampasas, Texas

Maximillian (Max) Margius Fernekes (July 7, 1905 – November 28, 1984) was an American artist known for his etching and watercolors of the Wisconsin cityscapes. He has been called the Norman Rockwell of Mineral Point and Milwaukee, Wisconsin.

== Biography ==
Fernekes was born to Max Fernekes Sr., a local architect who encouraged him to study engineering at Marquette University. Unfulfilled, Fernekes dropped out to become a full time artist. He first studied painting and printmaking for a year under artist Gustave Moeller.

Fernekes survived the Great Depression selling his art in the streets of Milwaukee with his wife the artist Ava Avery Fernekes. His work often depicts rural Wisconsin landscapes, documents its architecture and the daily lives of peoples, and at times cityscapes.

Fernekes illustrated in the 1930s Index of American Design, a catalog of pre-1880s decorative arts of Wisconsin, written by Clarence F. Hornung. This was financed by the highly publicized Works Progress Administration, which provided jobs to indigent American artists. One of his work included was 'Arch Grill' (1938). This helped launch his career as an illustrator. Fernekes was then commissioned by various Milwaukee journals, magazines, and newspapers.

Fernekes was a prolific artist and had many devoted fans. Among them was Michael T. Crowley Sr., former CEO of Bank Mutual, collected the paintings, which were displayed throughout Bank Mutual's corporate headquarters. When Associated Banc-Corp bought Bank Mutual, more than 90 paintings of Fernekes was donated to the Wisconsin Historical Society.

== Works ==
Ferneke's work are rarely available at auction but a number of his paintings are owned by the city of Milwaukee and on display, so can be viewed in various city buildings. These include:

- Arch Grill, National Gallery of Art -not on display.
- Elegance from Time Victorian, etching on display at the Milwaukee City Hall.
- Gesu Church Milwaukee, etching, on display at the city of Milwaukee 841 Bldg.
- Jones Island Main Street, etching on display at the Milwaukee City Hall.
- Milwaukee Avenue, etching on display at the Milwaukee City Hall.
- Milwaukee Skyline, etching on display at the Milwaukee City Hall.
- Northpoint Water Tower Milwaukee, etching on display at the Milwaukee City Hall.
- Northwestern Depot Milwaukee, etching on display at the city of Milwaukee 809 Bldg.
- Old Barn, watercolor, at the city of Milwaukee -not on display.
- Wells Street Bridge Milwaukee, etching on display at the city of Milwaukee 841 Bldg.

== Museum Collections ==
- National Gallery of Art, Washington, DC
- Wisconsin Historical Society, Madison, WI
