= Frederick Miller =

Brewery owner in Wisconsin (1824–1888)

Frederick Müller
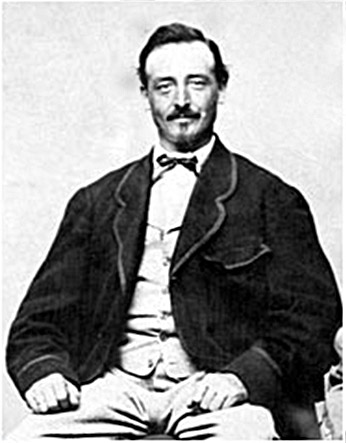
- Miller in an undated photograph
- Born: Friedrich Johannes Müller; November 24, 1824; Riedlingen, Kingdom of Württemberg, German Confederation
- Died: May 11, 1888 (aged 63); Milwaukee, Wisconsin, U.S.
- Burial place: Calvary Cemetery
- Known for: Miller Brewing Company
- Spouses: Josephine Müller; Lisette Gross Miller
- Children: 4 sons, 2 daughters

Frederick John Miller (born Friedrich Johannes Miller or Müller; November 24, 1824 – May 11, 1888) was a German-American brewery owner in Milwaukee, Wisconsin. He founded the Miller Brewing Company at the Plank Road Brewery, purchased in 1855. He learned the brewing business in Germany at Sigmaringen.

== Biography ==
Miller's grave at Calvary Cemetery

He was born Friedrich Johannes Miller in Riedlingen in the Kingdom of Württemberg. Some German records, like the one about the baptism of his first son Joseph Eduard, also state the name as Müller. Since the end of the 20th century, some publications state Miller's name as "Frederick Edward John Miller" from which they derive the birth name "Friedrich Eduard Johann(es) Müller".

Miller married Josephine Müller in Friedrichshafen, Württemberg, on June 7, 1853. Their first child, Joseph Edward Miller, was born the next year. In 1854, the family emigrated to the United States, spending the first year in New York. They moved to Wisconsin in 1855, arriving through New Orleans.

Josephine died in April 1860 and Miller married Lisette Gross and had five children who survived infancy: Ernst, Emil, Frederick II, Clara, and Elise. Clara married Carl A. Miller (no relation), also a German immigrant.

Frederick Miller once owned a tract of land in the Upper Peninsula of Michigan that is now Craig Lake State Park.

Miller died of cancer in 1888 at age 63, and was buried in the Calvary Cemetery in Milwaukee. Following his death, the company was run by his surviving three sons and son-in-law Carl.

== Family ==
Miller's younger daughter Elise was the mother of Harry G. John (1919–1992), president of the company from 1946 to 1947 and founder of the De Rance Corporation, once the world's largest Catholic charity.

Older daughter Clara's son Frederick C. Miller (1906–1954) was an All-American college football player at Notre Dame under Knute Rockne and became president of the company after John in 1947. He and his 20-year-old son Fred, Jr., were killed in a plane crash in Milwaukee in 1954. The nine-passenger twin-engine company aircraft was a converted Lockheed Ventura. It was bound for Winnipeg for a December hunting trip at Portage la Prairie; the crash also killed the two company pilots, brothers Joseph and Paul Laird.

== See also ==
- Eberhard Anheuser
- Jacob Best
- Valentin Blatz
- Adolphus Busch
- Adolph Coors
- Gottlieb Heileman
- Frederick Pabst
- Joseph Schlitz
- August Uihlein
