= George New =

American painter

George E. New
- Born: November 27, 1894; Bethlehem, Pennsylvania
- Died: February 14, 1963 (aged 68); Milwaukee, WI
- Known for: Painter, Etcher

Dr. George Edward New (1894–1963) was an etcher and portrait artist whose work garnered him international prestige. He is best known for a portrait of General Billy Mitchell, made from World War I photographs.

== Early years ==
George New was born November 27, 1894, in a Bethlehem, Pennsylvania suburb. In his early years he traveled with family and attended a number of prep schools on the east coast. A fishing expedition to Wisconsin, with his father, fostered his love for the state which he would eventually call home. New served in World War One on the French side, he was awarded the French Croix de Guerre after sustaining numerous injuries. After the war he finished his education in France and then was involved in archaeological expeditions in North Africa, and Asia.

== Milwaukee ==
From 1936 until 1941 he was a sort of artist in residence and informal lecturer on the Mount Mary College campus in Milwaukee, Wisconsin, although he never had faculty status. He also lectured occasionally at Marquette University. Dr. New taught art and art appreciation at Mount Mary College and lectured on history of art and cultural anthropology at Marquette University. New was awarded an honorary degree from Mount Mary College in 1937 and the Pere Marquette award from Marquette in 1957.

== Later life ==
New suffered a paralytic stroke on December 26, 1956, from which he never fully recovered. In his later years New continued to etch, but not at the rate prior to his stroke. He died on February 14, 1963. He was buried at Holy Cross Cemetery in Racine, Wisconsin on February 20, 1963.

== Artwork ==
One of George New's most widely known etchings was a portrait of General Billy Mitchell. Other etchings were acquired by the Library of Congress in Washington DC, the Metropolitan Museum of Art in New York, and museums in Paris and London. He was responsible for a number of etchings featuring prominent buildings of Midwestern campuses, including Northwestern University, Notre Dame University, the University of Chicago, Marquette University, and the University of Wisconsin–Madison. New also painted a number of portraits; these included Federal Judge F. Ryan Duffy, Col. Phillp Westfahl, and the last Czar of Russia.

== Archival collections ==
- George E. New Papers at Marquette University.

== See also ==
- Marquette University
- Marquette University Special Collections and University Archives
