= Walter Charles Kraatz =

American zoologist

Walter Charles Kraatz (1893–1970) was an American zoologist.

He was the head of the Biology Department at Akron University.
