= John Luick =

Confectioner and American Civil War veteran

- Born: 5 April 1840; Niagara Falls, New York, US
- Died: 30 March 1938 (aged 97); Milwaukee, Wisconsin, US
- Occupations: Confectioner, American Civil War veteran
- Spouse(s): Monica Adler (1867-1876); Elizabeth Hoff (1878-1931)

John Luick (born April 5, 1840 in Niagara Falls, New York – died March 30, 1938, in Milwaukee, Wisconsin) was the founder of Luick Ice Cream, which later became part of Sealtest Dairy.

== Life and career ==
Luick was born in Niagara Falls, New York to German-born parents Jacob and Elizabeth Luick. They moved to Milwaukee when John was 11 years old. At age 12, he began to work for Henry Miller, a confectioner. In 1861, he enlisted in the Union Army during the American Civil War, but returned to Milwaukee three months later due to ill health.

In 1874, he purchased James Curry's Confectioner and Ice Cream Business. Making ice cream is what brought his fame. He is known for being the first person to sell "bricks" of ice cream that could be taken home. He also innovated new flavors of ice cream. His company developed new machinery that would allow fruits and nuts to be consistent throughout the ice cream rather than settling at the bottom. President Grover Cleveland served Luick Ice Cream at a White House State Dinner.

Luick retired in 1903, leaving his business to his son. He died in 1938.

== See also ==
The Chudnow Museum of Yesteryear housed history and artifacts of Luick and his company, including an ice cream shop and soda counter.
