= Edward Wollert =

- Born: April 1, 1895; Milwaukee, Wisconsin
- Died: February 17, 1964 (aged 68); Milwaukee, Wisconsin
- Allegiance: United States
- Service / branch: Marine Corps
- Rank: Sergeant
- Awards: Medal of Honor

Edward Jacob Wollert served in the United States Marine Corps during World War I. He would be awarded the Navy Cross and Distinguished Service Cross.

Wollert was born on April 1, 1895, in Milwaukee, Wisconsin. He died in Milwaukee on February 17, 1964. He is buried in the Central Wisconsin Veterans Memorial Cemetery in Waupaca, Wisconsin.

His Navy Cross citation reads:

The President of the United States of America takes pleasure in presenting the Navy Cross to Corporal Edward J. Wollert (MCSN: 92209), United States Marine Corps, for extraordinary heroism while serving with the 79th Company, 6th Regiment (Marines), 2d Division, A.E.F. in action near Thiaucourt, France, 15 September 1918. At the risk of his life, Corporal Wollert went to the aid of a wounded officer who was a prisoner in the hands of six Germans. With his pistol he shot two of them, while the officer killed two others. He captured the two remaining Germans and forced them to carry the wounded officer back to our lines.

His Distinguished Service Cross citation reads:

The President of the United States of America, authorized by Act of Congress, July 9, 1918, takes pleasure in presenting the Distinguished Service Cross to Corporal Edward J. Wollert (MCSN: 92209), United States Marine Corps, for extraordinary heroism while serving with the Seventy-Ninth Company, Sixth Regiment (Marines), 2d Division, A.E.F., in action near Thiaucourt, France, 15 September 1918. At the risk of his life, Corporal Wollert went to the aid of a wounded officer who was a prisoner in the hands of six Germans. With his pistol he shot two of them, while the officer killed two others. He captured the two remaining Germans and forced them to carry the wounded officer back to our lines.
