= Gustav Otto Ludolf Heine =

American businessman

Gustav Otto Ludolf Heine (January 7, 1868 – April 23, 1959) was the owner of a piano business (Heine Piano Company) in San Francisco, which was formerly his boss's (Bruenn Piano Company). He also manufactured automobiles under the name of Heine-Velox.

== Early life ==
Heine was born near Boizenburg in the German grand duchy of Mecklenburg-Schwerin on January 7, 1868. He moved to Napa Valley, possibly in 1873, with his parents and seven siblings.

== Career ==
By the time Heine was sixteen years old, he moved to San Francisco and had gotten a job sweeping floors at the Bruenn Piano Company. He was soon trained as a piano tuner, and within two years became a partner at Bruenn. After a disagreement, Heine forcefully became owner of the company. He also sold pianos made by other manufacturers under his name; his pianos may say "Cincinnati" and "San Francisco".

Heine built a series of automobiles under the name of Heine-Velox. Three vehicles were manufactured before the 1906 San Francisco earthquake and fire destroyed both his workshop and piano store over on Union Square. He used his cars in relief efforts in the city, transporting people out of the city, carrying supplies like fresh milk and water, and even the dead for burial.

In 1907–08 he built some more cars with larger engines, these being featured in the San Francisco Auto Show in 1907. His car building activities were on hold until 1921 when he reintroduced the Heine-Velox name. The vehicle had a Weidly V-12 engine and retailed for $25,000. Around six were built.

== Death ==
Heine was found dead of a gunshot wound on April 23, 1959, at his three-story mansion in Sunol, California. His death was determined by the local sheriff to be a suicide.
