= Frederick Petersen =

American politician (1874–1946)

Frederick J. Petersen (whose name may be found spelled Frederic or Frederich, and occasionally Peterson even in official documents) (February 24, 1874 – October 14, 1946) was an American physiotherapist who served three terms as a Republican member of the Wisconsin State Assembly from Milwaukee, Wisconsin.

== Background ==
Petersen was born in Neenah, Wisconsin, on February 24, 1874. He attended Neenah public schools and Neenah High School, and graduated as a doctor of physiotherapy from the Philadelphia Orthopaedic Institute of Physio-Therapy, after which he came to Wisconsin, taking charge of the therapeutic department at the Northern State Hospital at Oshkosh for eight years, then doing the same at a sanatorium in Kenosha for three years, and another in Lake Geneva for eight years. He then moved to Milwaukee and went into practice there.

== Legislative service ==
Petersen's official biography of 1921 describes him as taking "a keen interest in municipal, state and national politics", but states falsely that he had "never sought or held a public office until elected to the assembly in 1920". In fact, in 1918 Petersen ran for the Assembly from the Sixth Milwaukee County district (the 6th Ward of the City of Milwaukee) to succeed Republican incumbent Charles Schiewitz (who was not a candidate for re-election). Petersen lost to Socialist Henry Sievers' who drew 1,105 votes to Petersen's 778.

Sievers was not a candidate for re-election in 1920, and was succeeded by Petersen, who won by 46 votes, with 1884 votes to 1838 for Socialist Eugene Cooney. He was assigned to the standing committees on elections and public welfare. In 1922, Sievers again faced Cooney, this time widening the margin of victory to 76 votes (1489 to 1413). He remained on the elections committee, but was shifted to the committee on manufactures and commerce.

In 1924, Petersen challenged Socialist Joseph Padway for the Sixth State Senate District, losing 7248 to 5384. He was succeeded in the Sixth Assembly seat by fellow Republican B. Z. Glass.

Glass was not a candidate for re-election in 1926, and Petersen returned to his old Assembly seat, polling 943 votes to 861 for John Lewin and 140 for John B. Traynor (political affiliations unknown). He was assigned once more to the committee on manufactures and commerce.

In 1928, Frederick W. Cords, Jr., the son of businessman and former Republican clerk of the Milwaukee County circuit court Fred W. Cords, Sr., defeated Petersen in the Republican primary election Cords went on to win the general election.

In 1930 Petersen was one of four challengers to Cords in a five-way primary, coming in third with 333 votes (Cords won a plurality with 734, but was unseated in the general election by Socialist Ben Rubin.

In 1932 Petersen was again one of Cords' competitors in another five-way primary over who would challenge Rubin, who was a candidate for re-election; this time Petersen came in fifth, with 165 votes (Cords again took the plurality with 685). In the general election, Cords again faced Rubin, Kaiser and another independent, as well as Petersen running as a nominal independent. This time Kaiser (with Franklin D. Roosevelt at the top of the Democratic ticket) was the victor, with 2240 votes to Cords' 1412, Rubin's 2130, and another 129 for the two independents. Petersen was last in the general election, polling only 37 votes.

In 1934, Petersen came out ahead in a three-way Republican primary, becoming the Republican nominee to take on Kaiser, Rubin, Progressive Fred G. Miller, and an independent. He came in fourth, behind Kaiser, Rubin and Miller.

== Personal life ==
Petersen was a Grand Chancellor of the Wisconsin Knights of Pythias, and helped preside in that capacity over the 1928 international convention of the Knights held in Milwaukee in August 1928. He died October 14, 1946, at his home in Milwaukee.
