= Clement Zablocki =

American politician (1912–1983)

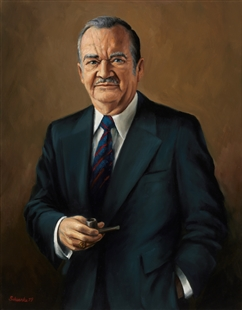
- 1979 portrait

Chair of the House Foreign Affairs Committee
- In office January 3, 1977 – December 3, 1983
- Preceded by: Thomas E. Morgan
- Succeeded by: Dante Fascell

Member of the U.S. House of Representatives from Wisconsin's 4th district
- In office January 3, 1949 – December 3, 1983
- Preceded by: John C. Brophy
- Succeeded by: Jerry Kleczka

Member of the Wisconsin Senate from the 3rd district
- In office January 1, 1943 – January 1, 1949
- Preceded by: Arthur L. Zimny
- Succeeded by: Casimir Kendziorski

Personal details
- Born: November 18, 1912 Milwaukee, Wisconsin, U.S.
- Died: December 3, 1983 (aged 71) Washington, D.C., U.S.
- Resting place: St. Adalbert Cemetery, Milwaukee
- Party: Democratic
- Spouse: Blanche M. Janic (m. 1937; died 1977)
- Children: 2
- Education: Marquette University (Ph.B.)

Clement John Zablocki (November 18, 1912 – December 3, 1983) was an American politician from Milwaukee, Wisconsin. He was one of Wisconsin's longest-serving members of the U.S. House of Representatives, representing Wisconsin's 4th congressional district for 18 terms, from 1949 until his death in 1983.

A liberal Democrat, he built his reputation in foreign policy by taking strong anti-communist positions and supporting the Vietnam War. He was a sponsor of the original Gulf of Tonkin Resolution which launched the American intervention, but near the end of the war he was a driving force for the War Powers Resolution, which sought to put restraints on the war-making powers of future presidents. He rose to become chair of the House Foreign Affairs Committee for the last seven years of his career.

== Early life and education ==
Clement Zablocki was born, raised, and lived most of his life in Milwaukee, Wisconsin. The son of Polish immigrants, he grew up speaking both Polish and English in Milwaukee's flourishing Polish American community. He attended St. Vincent's Catholic Parochial School and then graduated from Marquette University High School. He took lessons as an organist from age 10, and earned money for college by performing at church services and directing the church choir. He also worked as a department store clerk. He went on to attend Milwaukee's Marquette University, where he earned his Ph.B. in 1936. After graduating, he continued his work as a musician, and supplemented his income by teaching English and citizenship test preparation courses for Polish immigrants.

== Early political career ==
According to Milwaukee legend, Zablocki often emphasized with his Polish immigrant students the importance of participating in American politics. At one point, a student in his class, Mrs. Geniusz, responded to him saying that if he knew so much about politics, he should run for office. Zablocki responded by immediately declaring his candidacy for Wisconsin Senate. Whether or not that story is true, Zablocki had a strong base to begin a life in politics. His aunt, Leone Wozinski, was a leading figure in Milwaukee's Polish American community and was highly active with civic organizations which crossed over into other communities in the city. She introduced Zablocki to those organizations, and he quickly became "the life of the party".

Zablocki's run for Wisconsin Senate in 1938 was his first campaign for public office. He was only 26 and was launching a primary challenge against incumbent Arthur L. Zimny of Wisconsin's 3rd Senate district. Zimny had run afoul of local Democrats and the Polish community by accepting a number of personal benefits from the Wisconsin Progressive Party in exchange for his support in organizing the legislature. As it does today, the 3rd Senate district spanned a swath of the south side of the city of Milwaukee, from Walker's Point to the Jackson Park neighborhood, comprising many of the Polish American neighborhoods of the city. In addition to Zablocki, however, six other Democrats also sought to challenge Zimny in 1938, significantly diluting the vote. Zimni won renomination, but Zablocki posted a surprisingly strong second-place finish in the primary, falling only 411 votes short.

Zimny did not run again in 1942, and Zablocki was immediately seen as a frontrunner to replace him. Nevertheless, he did still face a competitive Democratic primary against Richard F. Maruszewski. Zablocki prevailed with 53.6% of the vote.

In the state Senate, Zablocki championed common Democratic issues of the time, supporting Franklin D. Roosevelt's New Deal policies, labor unions, and veterans benefits, but was deep in the minority and held little influence in the crafting of legislation. He defeated a primary challenge from former state representative Martin Franzkowiak in 1946, and won a landslide in the general election. In the Spring 1948 election, Zablocki sought election as Milwaukee city comptroller, but lost.

== Congress ==
Wisconsin's 4th congressional district 1931–1963

In 1946, Milwaukee's then-incumbent congressman Thaddeus Wasielewski lost the Democratic primary when seeking re-election, and then ran as an independent in the general election, splitting the Democratic vote and allowing Republican John C. Brophy to eke out a victory with 36% of the vote. When Wasielewski indicated he would not run again in 1948, Zablocki jumped into the race and quickly cleared the primary field. In the general election, however, Zablocki faced the danger of a split Democratic vote again, as the 1946 Democratic nominee Edmund V. Bobrowicz entered the race on the Progressive Party ticket. Zablocki and other prominent Milwaukee Democrats sought to head off this problem by denouncing Bobrowicz over past communist affiliations. The incumbent, Brophy, had only served on the Milwaukee City Council before his election to Congress and was regarded by the Wisconsin press as a weak campaigner relative to the gregarious Zablocki. At the general election, Zablocki won by a wide margin, taking nearly 56% of the vote.

He represented Wisconsin's 4th congressional district, which at that time comprised all of the southern half of Milwaukee County, including the south side of the city of Milwaukee, and also included the city and town of Wauwatosa. He was sworn in at the start of the 81st Congress and was reelected 17 times, serving from January 3, 1949, until his death on December 3, 1983. Zablocki faced several primary challenges during his career and nearly always faced a Republican opponent in the general election, but he never received less than 60% in another election after the 1948 general.

=== Early years in Congress ===
Zablocki was assigned to the House Foreign Affairs Committee from his first term in Congress. He immediately struck a strong anti-communist line, insisting that the United States should not recognize the newly established People's Republic of China, and asserting that the people of China—and those of Eastern Europe—would eventually overthrow Communism. Controversially, he also then said that the U.S. should sooner recognize the Franco regime than Communist China. During his first term, he also hailed the establishment of the state of Israel on the first anniversary of its founding, praising it as a haven for refugees and displaced persons after the devastation of World War II. Zablocki's continued support for rapprochement with Francoist Spain also led him into a public dispute with then-U.S. President Harry S. Truman in 1952. Zablocki also supported the Republican plan to invite General Douglas MacArthur to testify before Congress after his dismissal by President Truman.

Politically, Zablocki also clashed in these early years with the state Democratic Party leadership, particularly over patronage opportunities.

=== U.S. Senate special election (1957) ===
Zablocki made only one attempt to run for higher office after being elected to the U.S. House of Representatives. That attempt occurred in the 1957 special election for U.S. Senate following the death of senator Joseph McCarthy. In the Democratic primary election, Zablocki was opposed by former state representative William Proxmire, who had been the Democratic nominee for Governor of Wisconsin in the previous three general elections. Proxmire was an enthusiastic campaigner, and was—by then—well known throughout the state. At the primary, Zablocki put up a large majority in Milwaukee County, but Proxmire won nearly every other county and took the nomination easily. After losing the primary, however, Zablocki campaigned in Catholic communities around the state for Proxmire, sometimes accompanied by Massachusetts U.S. Senator John F. Kennedy. Their combined efforts led to Proxmire winning a surprise upset in the election, and was then emulated by future Democratic statewide campaigns.

=== Eisenhower and Kennedy administrations ===
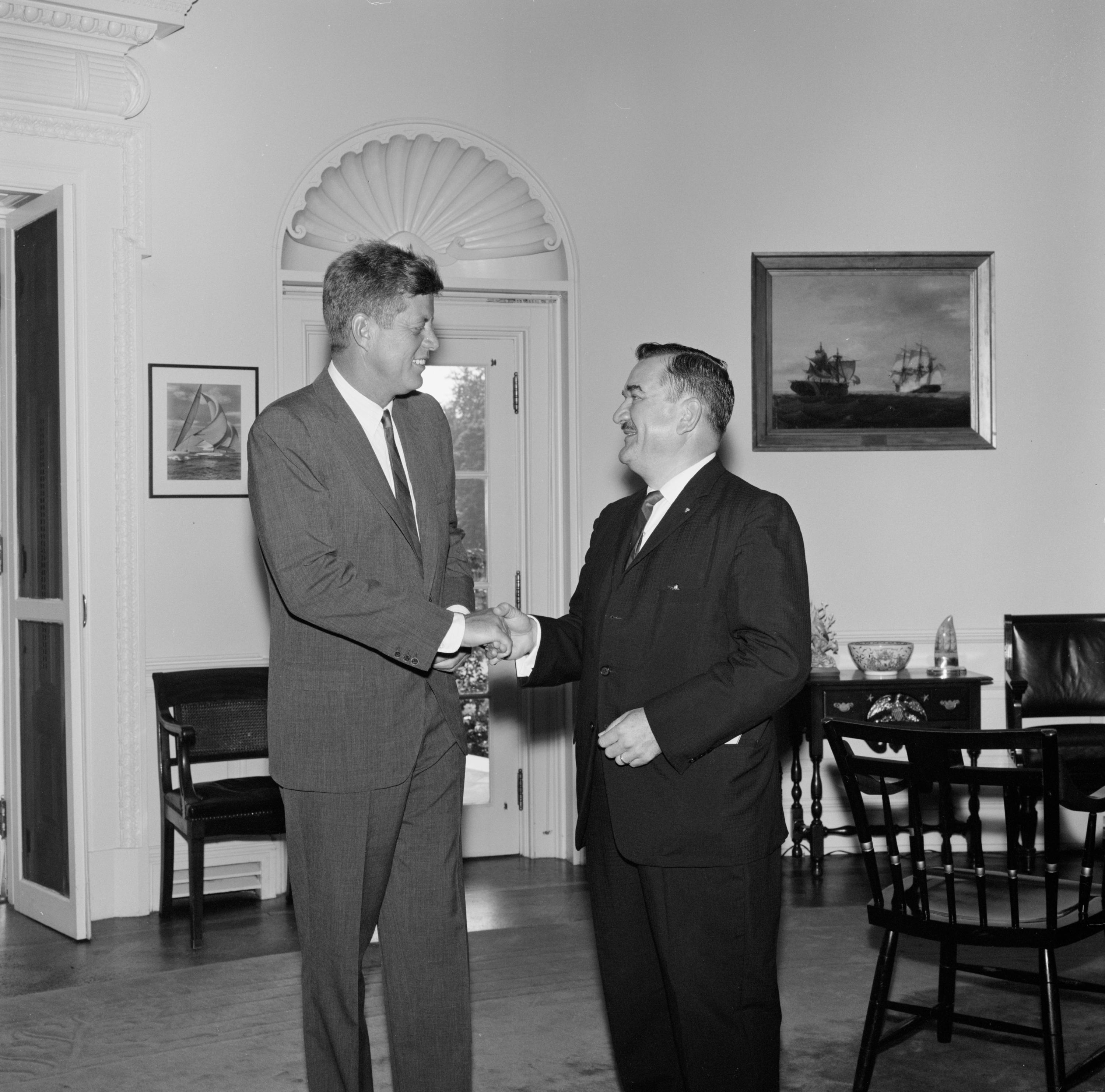
Zablocki with President Kennedy in the Oval Office, 1962.

During the presidency of Dwight D. Eisenhower, Zablocki was appointed as one of the United States delegates to the thirteenth session of the United Nations General Assembly.

Zablocki was an early supporter of Senator John F. Kennedy's presidential ambitions, endorsing his presidential campaign in early 1959 and volunteering to run as a Kennedy delegate in the 1960 primary. Later that year, Kennedy attended a series of events in Wisconsin culminating in a Pulaski Day dinner which included a celebration of Zablocki's decade of service in Congress. Zablocki later took credit for introducing Kennedy to the Polish-American community, which became part of Kennedy's base in the 1960 election. Zablocki was ultimately elected as a delegate to the 1960 Democratic National Convention. Kennedy would, in 1962, refer to Zablocki as his campaign manager in Wisconsin.

Zablocki shepherded many of Kennedy's foreign policy initiatives through Congress, including the Peace Corps, the Arms Control and Disarmament Agency, and his foreign aid program.

=== Civil rights ===
Zablocki voted in favor of the Civil Rights Act of 1964 and the Voting Rights Act of 1965, but saw significant backlash from his Polish American constituency. After segregationist candidate George Wallace was warmly received by his constituents in 1964, Zablocki began to waver on civil rights issues, opposing a fair housing law and taking other symbolic steps—distancing himself from activist Catholic priest James Groppi and maintaining his membership in the Fraternal Order of Eagles, which then excluded African Americans.

=== Vietnam War ===
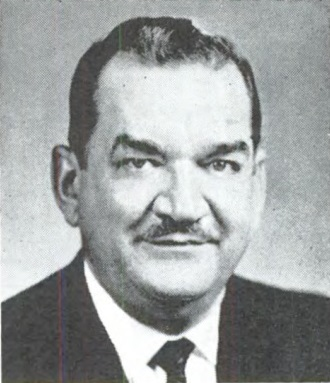
Zablocki's official portrait in the 90th Congress, 1967.

Zablocki was assigned to the House Foreign Affairs subcommittee on the Far East and Pacific, and began taking a particular interest in checking Communist expansion in southeast Asia in the early 1950s. In response to increased activity by the Pathet Lao, he suggested that a United Nations mission might be needed for Laos, not unlike the U.S.-led UN mission that had just fought the Korean War.

Zablocki traveled to South Vietnam to assess the government of president Ngo Dinh Diem just weeks before his assassination in 1963. Zablocki expressed that he believed criticism of Diem was overblown, and accusations of corruption were unfounded. Further, he expressed that there was no viable replacement for Diem, and that the Diem regime would remain stable so long as the United States support remained steadfast.

After the assassinations of Diem and Kennedy, Zablocki opposed increased American troop presence in Vietnam. He remained reticent about utilizing American troops after the Gulf of Tonkin incident, but co-sponsored the enabling Gulf of Tonkin Resolution in August 1964. In the year after Tonkin, Zablocki warmed to the idea of direct American involvement in the war, and suggested that he would be comfortable with maintaining an American presence in South Vietnam for more than 15 years.

Although Zablocki's position on Vietnam became more politically unpopular within his party as the war dragged on, he easily survived several primary challenges. He served as chair of President Lyndon B. Johnson's doomed re-election effort in Wisconsin in 1968.

Following the election of Richard Nixon as president, Zablocki continued to support the administration's Vietnam policy. Behind the scenes, however, Zablocki was souring on the war. In 1970, he began work on an early version of the War Powers Resolution. By 1971, Zablocki publicly supported a resolution from the House Foreign Affairs Committee calling for Nixon to set a date for a final American withdrawal from Vietnam as part of a broader effort to return American prisoners of war. And in 1972, Zablocki was a co-author of the Case-Zablocki Act, which required that executive agreements by the president be reported to Congress in 60 days. He ultimately helped push through the final version of the War Powers Resolution in 1973, over Nixon's veto.

Zablocki remained an advocate for the interests of Vietnam War prisoners of war and missing in action. During May 1973 hearings, Zablocki observed that returning prisoners uniformly had expressed their belief that there were no U.S. servicemen still alive in Vietnam.

=== Chair of House Foreign Affairs ===
With the retirement of House Foreign Affairs Committee chairman Thomas E. Morgan in 1977, Zablocki—with 28 years of seniority in the House—was a strong candidate to succeed him in the 95th Congress. But Zablocki faced intense opposition, led by veteran New York congressman Benjamin Rosenthal. Rosenthal circulated a memo criticizing Zablocki's temperament, reputation, and policy positions, accusing him of being more like a conservative Republican on foreign policy issues. Among Rosenthal's policy charges, he faulted Zablocki for frequently siding with nationalist parties, such as the South Korean military dictatorship and the Kuomintang of Taiwan. He accused Zablocki of blocking human rights proposals and attempts to cut off or limit support to regimes that were committing human rights violations. He said Zablocki's stance on the middle east isolated him from all sides—where Zablocki had suggested withdrawing support from both Israel and Egypt. And he assailed Zablocki's continued vocal support for the war in Vietnam long after most of the party had turned against the conflict.

Zablocki reacted angrily and compared the memo to McCarthyism. He charged that Rosenthal's criticism was mostly motivated by his opinion that Zablocki was not sufficiently supportive of Israel. He further responded to some of Rosenthal's specific points, saying that cutting off aid to allies would not improve human rights, and that withdrawing from Vietnam harmed the United States reputation in Asia. But Zablocki did acknowledge that his support of South Vietnam and other nationalist governments in Asia may have "gone overboard" at times.

Ultimately, 72 Democrats voted against Zablocki becoming chair of the committee, but 182 voted in favor, giving him more than enough support to secure the seat. After taking the chair, Zablocki indicated strong support for the policies of the incoming Jimmy Carter administration, including reopening negotiations over the status of the Panama Canal Zone and holding the Soviet Union to their commitments on the Strategic Arms Limitation Talks and the Helsinki Accords. Zablocki also sought to mend fences with Rosenthal, saying the first bill he would issue from his committee would be an amendment to the Export Control Act which would prohibit U.S. traders from joining boycotts against Israel.

At the start of the 96th Congress, President Carter formally recognized the government of the People's Republic of China. Zablocki then introduced the Taiwan Relations Act, which clarified and formalized the position of the United States toward Taiwan in the wake of that recognition. The Taiwan Relations Act remains the foundation of U.S.–Taiwan relations, and restricts an American president from making unilateral changes to that policy.

In the presidency of Ronald Reagan, Zablocki sought common ground and consensus with the Republican administration. Reagan strongly disputed the constitutionality of the War Powers Resolution, which Zablocki had championed. Zablocki—intent on preserving congressional oversight of war powers—negotiated a compromise with Reagan in which his deployment of armed forces to Lebanon would be authorized by Congress, and in exchange Reagan would sign legislation tacitly acknowledging the limits imposed by the war powers resolution.

=== Later years and death ===
Zablocki was wrapping up his seventh year as chair of the House Foreign Affairs Committee, and was at the height of his power and influence when he suffered a heart attack in his office on November 30, 1983, just before a planned meeting with Israeli prime minister Yitzhak Shamir. Zablocki was hospitalized in critical condition for three days, but did not recover. He died December 3, 1983, at Capitol Hill Hospital (now 700 Constitution Apartments).

Zablocki's funeral mass was held at Blessed Sacrament Catholic Church in Milwaukee, and was attended by roughly 1,000 people. Distinguished guests included House speaker Tip O'Neill, several dozen members of Congress, diplomats, and congressional staffers, as well as Wisconsin's governor, Tony Earl, both of Wisconsin's U.S. senators, and Milwaukee mayor Henry Maier. In his eulogy, Reverend Lesniewski described Zablocki as one who was equally at home with "those who ate caviar and those who ate kielbasa". Zablocki was buried at Saint Adalbert Catholic Cemetery in Milwaukee.

== Personal life and family ==
Clement Zablocki was the fifth of nine children born to Mathias Zablocki and his wife Mary (née Jankowski). Both of Zablocki's parents were immigrants from the Poznań region, part of Poland that was controlled by the German Empire during their lifetime. The Zablockis were Catholics and were members of the Blessed Sacrament Catholic Church in Milwaukee.

Clement Zablocki married his childhood sweetheart, Blanche Janic, in 1937. They had no biological children, but adopted a son and daughter. Zablocki's mother and wife died within days of each other in July 1977.

== Legacy ==
The Clement J. Zablocki Veterans Affairs Medical Center at 5000 West National Avenue in Milwaukee is named for him, as is the Zablocki Library and the Clement J. Zablocki Elementary School in Milwaukee.

== Electoral history ==
=== Wisconsin Senate (1938, 1942, 1946) ===
Year	Election	Date	Elected				Defeated				Total	Plurality
1938	Primary	Sep. 20	Arthur L. Zimny (inc)	Democratic	3,071	37.02%	Clement J. Zablocki	Dem.	2,660	32.06%	8,296	411
1938	Primary	Sep. 20	Arthur L. Zimny (inc)	Democratic	3,071	37.02%	Andrew Wesolowski	Dem.	789	9.51%	8,296	411
1938	Primary	Sep. 20	Arthur L. Zimny (inc)	Democratic	3,071	37.02%	Henry J. Dettlaff	Dem.	494	5.95%	8,296	411
1938	Primary	Sep. 20	Arthur L. Zimny (inc)	Democratic	3,071	37.02%	E. D. Wesolowski	Dem.	417	5.03%	8,296	411
1938	Primary	Sep. 20	Arthur L. Zimny (inc)	Democratic	3,071	37.02%	Ben M. Potter	Dem.	291	3.51%	8,296	411
1938	Primary	Sep. 20	Arthur L. Zimny (inc)	Democratic	3,071	37.02%	Stanley Fajkowski	Dem.	288	3.47%	8,296	411
1938	Primary	Sep. 20	Arthur L. Zimny (inc)	Democratic	3,071	37.02%	W. M. Langen	Dem.	286	3.45%	8,296	411
1942	Primary	Sep. 15	Clement J. Zablocki	Democratic	3,015	53.62%	Richard F. Maruszewski	Dem.	2,608	46.38%	5,623	407
1942	General	Nov. 3	Clement J. Zablocki	Democratic	10,253	48.81%	Alfred J. Melms	Prog.	6,299	29.99%	21,006	3,954
1942	General	Nov. 3	Clement J. Zablocki	Democratic	10,253	48.81%	Harry E. Chelminiak	Rep.	3,810	18.14%	21,006	3,954
1942	General	Nov. 3	Clement J. Zablocki	Democratic	10,253	48.81%	Edward Schultheis	Soc.	644	3.07%	21,006	3,954
1946	Primary	Aug. 13	Clement J. Zablocki (inc)	Democratic	4,271	67.63%	Martin Franzkowiak	Dem.	2,044	32.37%	6,315	2,227
1946	General	Nov. 5	Clement J. Zablocki (inc)	Democratic	17,414	66.81%	Leonard W. Galbrecht	Rep.	7,736	29.68%	26,066	9,678
1946	General	Nov. 5	Clement J. Zablocki (inc)	Democratic	17,414	66.81%	Edward Schultheis	Soc.	916	3.51%	26,066	9,678

=== U.S. House of Representatives (1948–1982) ===
Year	Election	Date	Elected				Defeated				Total	Plurality
1948	General	Nov. 2	Clement J. Zablocki	Democratic	89,391	55.89%	John C. Brophy (inc.)	Rep.	63,161	39.49%	159,929	26,230
1948	General	Nov. 2	Clement J. Zablocki	Democratic	89,391	55.89%	Edmund V. Bobrowicz	Prog.	5,051	3.16%	159,929	26,230
1948	General	Nov. 2	Clement J. Zablocki	Democratic	89,391	55.89%	Clement Stachowiak	Soc.	2,326	1.45%	159,929	26,230
1950	Primary	Sep. 19	Clement J. Zablocki (inc.)	Democratic	27,717	72.16%	Thaddeus Wasielewski	Dem.	10,692	27.84%	38,409	17,025
1950	General	Nov. 2	Clement J. Zablocki (inc.)	Democratic	83,564	60.88%	John C. Brophy	Rep.	53,702	39.12%	137,266	29,862
1952	Primary	Sep. 9	Clement J. Zablocki (inc.)	Democratic	43,710	77.84%	Edwin L. Nowak	Dem.	12,445	22.16%	56,155	31,265
1952	General	Nov. 4	Clement J. Zablocki (inc.)	Democratic	131,098	64.27%	John C. Schafer	Rep.	72,869	35.73%	203,967	58,229
1954	General	Nov. 2	Clement J. Zablocki (inc.)	Democratic	100,120	71.09%	John C. Schafer	Rep.	40,723	28.91%	140,843	59,397
1956	General	Nov. 6	Clement J. Zablocki (inc.)	Democratic	128,213	65.66%	William J. Burke	Rep.	67,063	34.34%	195,276	61,150
1958	Primary	Sep. 9	Clement J. Zablocki (inc.)	Democratic	36,857	85.38%	Roman R. Blenski	Dem.	6,311	14.62%	43,168	30,546
1958	General	Nov. 4	Clement J. Zablocki (inc.)	Democratic	112,226	74.13%	James J. Arnold	Rep.	39,167	25.87%	151,393	73,059
1960	Primary	Sep. 13	Clement J. Zablocki (inc.)	Democratic	47,718	88.00%	Roman R. Blenski	Dem.	6,505	12.00%	54,223	41,213
1960	General	Nov. 8	Clement J. Zablocki (inc.)	Democratic	155,789	71.71%	Samuel P. Murray	Rep.	61,468	28.29%	217,257	94,321
1962	Primary	Sep. 11	Clement J. Zablocki (inc.)	Democratic	41,408	87.91%	Roman R. Blenski	Dem.	5,694	12.09%	47,102	35,714
1962	General	Nov. 6	Clement J. Zablocki (inc.)	Democratic	117,029	72.51%	David F. Tillotson	Rep.	44,368	27.49%	161,397	72,661
1964	Primary	Sep. 8	Clement J. Zablocki (inc.)	Democratic	48,887	89.28%	Roman R. Blenski	Dem.	5,870	10.72%	54,757	43,017
1964	General	Nov. 3	Clement J. Zablocki (inc.)	Democratic	125,683	74.17%	Edward E. Estkowski	Rep.	43,773	25.83%	169,456	81,910
1966	Primary	Sep. 13	Clement J. Zablocki (inc.)	Democratic	37,588	90.10%	Roman R. Blenski	Dem.	4,129	9.90%	41,717	33,459
1966	General	Nov. 8	Clement J. Zablocki (inc.)	Democratic	77,690	74.31%	James E. Laessig	Rep.	26,863	25.69%	104,553	50,827
1968	Primary	Sep. 10	Clement J. Zablocki (inc.)	Democratic	32,121	86.04%	Roman R. Blenski	Dem.	5,212	13.96%	37,333	26,909
1968	General	Nov. 5	Clement J. Zablocki (inc.)	Democratic	118,203	72.62%	Walter McCullough	Rep.	44,558	27.38%	162,761	73,645
1970	Primary	Sep. 8	Clement J. Zablocki (inc.)	Democratic	32,201	85.35%	Donald P. Lass	Dem.	5,529	14.65%	37,730	26,672
1970	General	Nov. 3	Clement J. Zablocki (inc.)	Democratic	102,464	80.35%	Phillip D. Mrozinski	Rep.	23,081	18.10%	127,530	79,383
1970	General	Nov. 3	Clement J. Zablocki (inc.)	Democratic	102,464	80.35%	John A. Zierhut	Amer.	1,985	1.56%	127,530	79,383
1972	Primary	Sep. 12	Clement J. Zablocki (inc.)	Democratic	32,087	75.78%	Therese M. Heimann	Dem.	4,337	10.24%	42,340	27,750
1972	Primary	Sep. 12	Clement J. Zablocki (inc.)	Democratic	32,087	75.78%	Grant D. Waldo	Dem.	3,890	9.19%	42,340	27,750
1972	Primary	Sep. 12	Clement J. Zablocki (inc.)	Democratic	32,087	75.78%	Roman R. Blenski	Dem.	2,026	4.79%	42,340	27,750
1972	General	Nov. 7	Clement J. Zablocki (inc.)	Democratic	149,078	75.66%	Phillip D. Mrozinski	Rep.	45,008	22.84%	197,032	104,070
1972	General	Nov. 7	Clement J. Zablocki (inc.)	Democratic	149,078	75.66%	Eugene Annell	Amer.	2,946	1.50%	197,032	104,070
1974	General	Nov. 5	Clement J. Zablocki (inc.)	Democratic	84,768	72.46%	Lewis D. Collison	Rep.	27,818	23.78%	116,990	56,950
1974	General	Nov. 5	Clement J. Zablocki (inc.)	Democratic	84,768	72.46%	Herbert O. Jahnke	Amer.	4,404	3.76%	116,990	56,950
1976	Primary	Sep. 14	Clement J. Zablocki (inc.)	Democratic	29,540	83.50%	Roman R. Blenski	Dem.	5,838	16.50%	35,378	23,702
1976	General	Nov. 2	Clement J. Zablocki (inc.)	Democratic	172,166	100.0%	--Unopposed--				172,166	N/A
1978	General	Nov. 7	Clement J. Zablocki (inc.)	Democratic	101,575	66.09%	Elroy C. Honadel	Rep.	52,125	33.91%	153,700	49,450
1980	Primary	Sep. 9	Clement J. Zablocki (inc.)	Democratic	29,411	89.40%	Roman R. Blenski	Dem.	3,489	10.60%	32,900	25,922
1980	General	Nov. 4	Clement J. Zablocki (inc.)	Democratic	146,437	70.02%	Elroy C. Honadel	Rep.	61,027	29.18%	209,134	85,410
1980	General	Nov. 4	Clement J. Zablocki (inc.)	Democratic	146,437	70.02%	Lynn Rashkind	Ind.	1,670	0.80%	209,134	85,410
1982	Primary	Sep. 14	Clement J. Zablocki (inc.)	Democratic	56,047	60.82%	Lynn Adelman	Dem.	36,102	39.18%	92,149	19,945
1982	General	Nov. 2	Clement J. Zablocki (inc.)	Democratic	129,557	94.58%	Nicholas P. Youngers	Lib.	4,064	2.97%	136,988	125,493
1982	General	Nov. 2	Clement J. Zablocki (inc.)	Democratic	129,557	94.58%	John F. Baumgartner	Ind.	2,421	1.77%	136,988	125,493
1982	General	Nov. 2	Clement J. Zablocki (inc.)	Democratic	129,557	94.58%	John Gudenschwager	Cons.	946	0.69%	136,988	125,493

== See also ==
- List of members of the United States Congress who died in office (1950–1999)

Wisconsin Senate
Preceded by Arthur L. Zimny	Member of the Wisconsin Senate from the 3rd district January 1, 1943 – January 1, 1949	Succeeded by Casimir Kendziorski
U.S. House of Representatives
Preceded by John C. Brophy	Member of the U.S. House of Representatives from Wisconsin's 4th congressional district January 3, 1949 – December 3, 1983	Succeeded by Jerry Kleczka
Preceded by Thomas E. Morgan (Pennsylvania)	Chair of the House Foreign Affairs Committee; January 3, 1977 – December 3, 1983	Succeeded by Dante Fascell (Florida)
