= James Vint =

American politician (1881–1965)

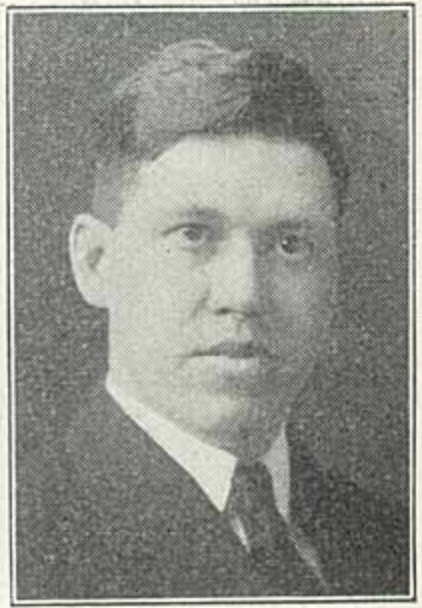

Commissioner of the Wisconsin Department of Markets
- In office September 12, 1927 – September 16, 1929
- Governor: Fred R. Zimmerman
- Preceded by: Edward Nordman
- Succeeded by: O. J. Thompson (as Secretary of Agriculture and Markets)

Member of the Wisconsin State Assembly
- In office January 6, 1913 – January 1, 1917
- Preceded by: Frederick Brockhausen
- Succeeded by: William E. Jordan
- Constituency: Milwaukee 11th
- In office January 2, 1911 – January 6, 1913
- Preceded by: Fred R. Zimmerman
- Succeeded by: Jacob J. Litza Jr.
- Constituency: Milwaukee 8th

Personal details
- Born: January 14, 1881 Hamilton, Ontario, British North America
- Died: January 7, 1965 (aged 83) Milwaukee, Wisconsin, U.S.
- Resting place: Forest Home Cemetery, Milwaukee
- Party: Social Democratic
- Spouse: Laura Louise Gisch (m. 1906–1965)
- Occupation: Machinist, farmer

James Henry Vint (January 14, 1881 – January 7, 1965) was a Canadian American immigrant, machinist, and Socialist politician from Milwaukee, Wisconsin. He represented the west side of the city of Milwaukee in the Wisconsin State Assembly for three terms from 1911 through 1917. He later served two years as commissioner of the Wisconsin Department of Markets, under Governor Fred R. Zimmerman.

== Background ==
Vint was born in Hamilton, Ontario, on January 14, 1881, and came to Milwaukee in 1892, where he was educated in the Milwaukee Public Schools. He became a machinist and a member of the Machinists Union (his 1913 Wisconsin Blue Book profile says he had been a union member eleven years).

== Service in the legislature ==
In 1910, Vint was elected to the Assembly to represent the Eighth Milwaukee County district (the 8th and 23rd wards of the City of Milwaukee). He received 1521 votes, to 1501 for Republican incumbent Fred R. Zimmerman, 143 for Democrat Harry McLogan, and 12 for Prohibitionist William Trout. He was assigned to the standing committees on agricultural exhibitions, and on express, telegraph and telephone.

In 1912, after a redistricting, he ran from the 11th Milwaukee County district, which included the 23rd ward from his old district, and the 11th ward, which had formerly constituted the 11th district and been represented by fellow Socialist Frederick Brockhausen (who was running for the Wisconsin State Senate). He won re-election, with 2242 votes to 2015 for Democrat J. F. Hefferman, 1146 for Republican L. A. Conlan, and 103 for Prohibitionist Lucia Willis; and was transferred to the committee on state affairs, and the special committee on rules.

In 1914, he was again re-elected, with 2062 votes to 1426 for Republican William Klug, 997 for Democrat Clement Emery, and 61 for Prohibitionist Willis. He remained on the rules committee, but also moved to the standing committees on taxation and on elections.

He did not run for re-election in 1916, and was succeeded by fellow Socialist William E. Jordan.

== After the legislature ==
Vint soon moved to Union Grove in Racine County, where he operated an 80-acre farm and served as manager of the Farmers' Cooperative Elevator company. In 1927, he was appoint head of the Wisconsin Department of Markets. In May 1929, he became chairman of the newly-organized Wisconsin affiliate of the National Potato Institute. Late in 1929, the Department of Markets was merged into the new state Department of Agriculture and Markets.

In 1931, Vint was elected as a delegate to a meeting of progressive Republicans which would nominate a candidate for the special election for the United States House of Representatives to replace Henry Allen Cooper. The Progressives were not yet officially a third party.

He died January 7, 1965, at a hospital in Milwaukee. Local newspapers said that he'd lived in Union Grove for fifty years, where he was a member of the local Masonic lodge and director of two consumer cooperatives. He was survived by his wife Laura and two children. He was buried in Milwaukee's Forest Home Cemetery.

Wisconsin State Assembly
Preceded by Fred R. Zimmerman	Member of the Wisconsin State Assembly from the Milwaukee 8th district January 2, 1911 – January 6, 1913	Succeeded by Jacob J. Litza Jr.
Preceded by Frederick Brockhausen	Member of the Wisconsin State Assembly from the Milwaukee 11th district January 6, 1913 – January 1, 1917	Succeeded by William E. Jordan
Government offices
Preceded by Edward Nordman	Commissioner of the Wisconsin Department of Markets; September 12, 1927 – September 16, 1929	Succeeded by O. J. Thompson (as Secretary of Agriculture and Markets)
