= Henry Sievers =

American politician

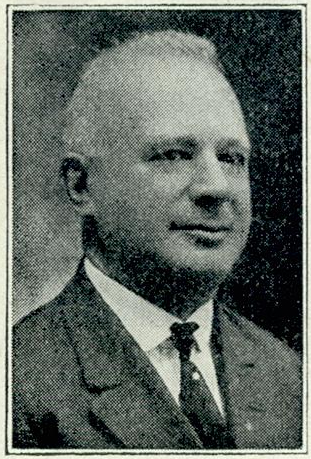
Sievers's official State Assembly portrait, 1919

Henry Sievers (October 13, 1874 – April 11, 1965) was an assistant printer, trade union activist and liquor store operator from Milwaukee, Wisconsin who served one term as a Socialist member of the Wisconsin State Assembly. Sievers died on April 11, 1965.

== Background ==
Sievers was born in Milwaukee on October 13, 1874, was educated in the public schools. At the age of 15 Sievers became a printer's apprentice and worked at various Milwaukee newspapers for several years, joining the International Typographical Union in 1899 after eight years in the trade., before going into the retail liquor business, in which business he remained for 19 years, retiring in 1918. He had remained an honorary member of the Typographical Union, and was active in union and Socialist circles for years prior to his election.

== Legislative service ==
In 1918, Sievers was elected to the Assembly from the Sixth Milwaukee County district (the 6th Ward of the City of Milwaukee) to succeed Republican incumbent Charles Schiewitz (who was not a candidate for re-election). Sievers won with 1,105 votes to 778 for Republican Frederick Petersen, and was assigned to the standing committee on insurance and banking.

Sievers was not a candidate for re-election in 1920, and was succeeded by Petersen.
