= Benjamin Charles Garside =

American politician (1863–1933)

Benjamin C. Garside

Member of the Wisconsin State Assembly from the Milwaukee 8th district
- In office January 3, 1887 – January 7, 1889
- Preceded by: Frank Haderer
- Succeeded by: Amos Thomas

Personal details
- Born: June 26, 1863 Glossop, England, UK
- Died: August 9, 1933 (aged 70) Chicago, Illinois, U.S.
- Cause of death: Heart attack
- Resting place: Crown Hill Cemetery, Wheat Ridge, Colorado
- Party: Labor
- Spouse: Emily Shepherd (m. 1885–1933)
- Children: at least 3
- Occupation: Machinist

Benjamin Charles Garside (June 26, 1863 – August 9, 1933) was an English American immigrant, machinist, and politician from Milwaukee, Wisconsin. He served one term in the Wisconsin State Assembly, representing the southwest side of Milwaukee during the 1887 term. He was elected as a Labor candidate, and described himself as pro-tariff and anti-monopoly.

== Background ==
Garside was born in Glossop, Derbyshire, England, on June 26, 1863. He came to Wisconsin in 1864 and settled at Milwaukee, was educated in the Second Ward public school of Milwaukee, and became a machinist by trade. He lived in South Chicago, Illinois from 1880 to 1883 before returning to Milwaukee.

== Elective office ==
Garside was on the executive committee of the Milwaukee Knights of Labor, and was one of the labor leaders under indictment for their roles in the labor unrest which ended in the Bay View Massacre, when elected to the Assembly in 1886 from the 8th Milwaukee County Assembly district (the 8th, 11th and 14th Ward of the City of Milwaukee) to succeed Democrat Frank Haderer (who was not a candidate for re-election) for the session of 1887. Garside won 2580 votes on a "High tariff and anti-monopoly" platform, to 1094 for Republican Charles Weilner and 652 votes for Democratic former Assemblyman John Fellenz. He received five votes as the People's Party candidate for Speaker of the Assembly; and was assigned to the standing committee on state affairs.

He ran for re-election in 1888 under the People's Party's new name of "Labor Party", losing to Republican Amos Thomas, who polled 2351 votes, to 1375 votes for former Democratic Assemblyman George Everts and 248 for Garside.

== Personal life ==
At the time of his service in the Assembly he was married. He died on August 9, 1933, in Chicago, Illinois.
