= Martin Gorecki =

American politician

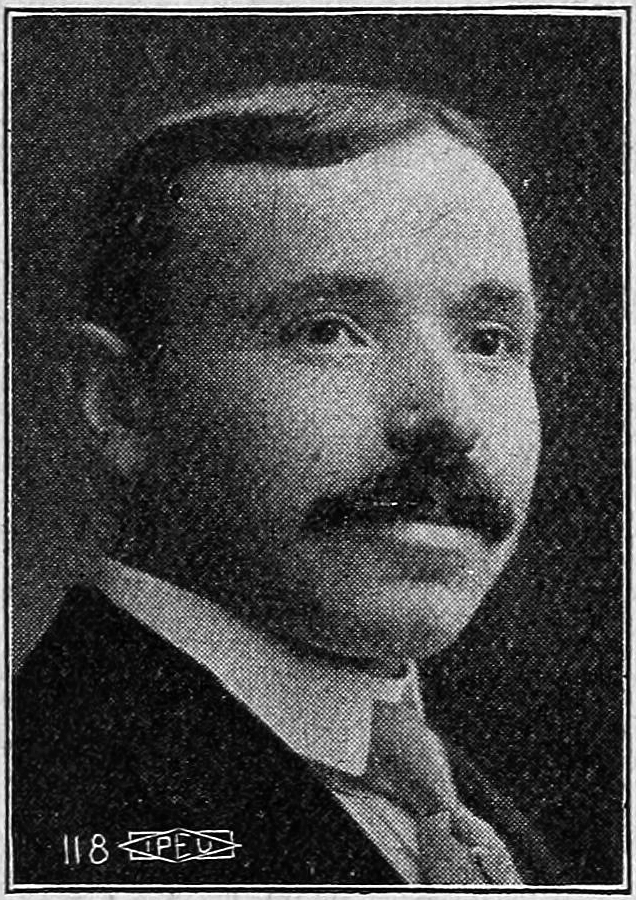
Gorecki c. 1912

Martin Gorecki (October 20, 1871 – 1928) was a brewery worker, ethnic Polish leader and politician from Milwaukee, Wisconsin who served one term as a Socialist member of the Wisconsin State Assembly.

== Background ==
Gorecki was born in Bydgoszcz (Bromberg) in the Polish-majority Province of Posen of the German Empire, on October 20, 1871. He attended public schools and immigrated to the United States at the age of eighteen. In 1902 he settled in Milwaukee, worked in the Schlitz brewery, joined the Beer Bottlers' Union and was later transferred to Brewers' Union Local 9. He served as a delegate to the Federated Trades Council from both unions. He became active as a leader of the Polish School Society, which was an anti-clerical organization devoted to public education and the teaching of the Polish language in public schools, and under his leadership served as a base for recruiting for the Socialists. He was active in organizing the five ethnic Polish Milwaukee branches of the Social Democratic party (as it was known in Wisconsin), and in establishing the Naprzod (Forward), a weekly Socialist Polish language newspaper.

== Public office ==
In 1904, Gorecki ran for the Assembly in the Fourteenth Milwaukee County district (the 14th Ward of the City of Milwaukee), coming in second, behind Democrat John Szymarek, with 1623 votes for Szymarek, 975 for Gorecki, and 855 for Republican John J. Derwort. In 1906, he tried again, losing to Democrat Joseph Domachowski by 1004 to 915, with the Republican a distant third at 460. In 1908, he challenged Domachowski again, losing with 2,001 for the now-incumbent Domachowski, 852 for Gorecki, and 736 for Republican Stanislaus Molszewki.

In 1910 he was elected a Milwaukee alderman-at-large for a two-year term. In 1912 he was elected to the Assembly from the Fourteenth district (which now added to the 14th Ward, the new 24th Ward), to succeed fellow Socialist Michael Katzban. Gorecki won with 1,519 votes to 1,094 for Democrat Jacob Posanski and 609 for Republican John Phillips. He was assigned to the standing committees on insurance and banking, and on public welfare.

He did not run for re-election in 1914, and was succeeded by fellow Socialist George L. Tews.

== After the Assembly; personal life ==
In 1915, it was announced that he had started a Polish-language humorous newspaper called The Cymbal. His son John Gorecki married teenage dancer Marianna Michalska, later to become famous as "Gilda Gray", the shimmy girl, around 1915, when she was 14 or 15 years old; the couple, who divorced in 1923, had one son, Martin Gorecki (born in 1913), who was to become a bandleader and emcee under the name "Martin Gray".

Gorecki's will was filed for probate in December 1928; it included provisions for John and for a widow, who is referred to only as "Mrs. Martin Gorecki". By that point, he himself was obscure enough that the headline in his home-town newspaper referred to him simply as Gilda's first father-in-law, without reference to his labor or political record.
