= Phillip Markey =

American politician (1913–2003)

Phillip Markey (August 1, 1913 – January 7, 2003) was an American lawyer who served one term as a Progressive member of the Wisconsin State Assembly. He was from Milwaukee, Wisconsin.

== Background ==
Markey was born in Milwaukee on August 1, 1913. He attended the Fourth Street School, the Ninth Street School, Lincoln High School, Milwaukee State Teachers College, and Marquette University. He received his LL.B. degree from the University of Wisconsin Law School and was admitted to the bar in 1940. He worked for the Smith Steel Company and the Sivyer Steel Company.

== Legislature ==
In 1942, Markey was narrowly declared victor in a five-way race, after a recount, winning election as a Progressive to succeed Socialist Ben Rubin in Milwaukee County's Sixth Assembly district (the Sixth Ward of the City of Milwaukee). A voting recount happened because African American Republican, Cleveland Moland Colbert was initially declared the winner, but after the recount Markey was only 10 votes higher. Markey had polled 1458 votes, to 1448 for Republican Cleveland Colbert; 917 for Democrat Charles Bennett; 652 for Independent Progressive Joseph Alberti; and 109 for Socialist Robert Repas. He was assigned to the standing committee on printing.

Markey ran for re-election in 1944 as a Republican, and was defeated in a three-way race by African American Democrat Le Roy Simmons, although he did finish ahead of the Progressive candidate. He ran again in the 1946 Republican primary election for the chance to face Simmons (by this time Wisconsin's Progressives had merged back into the Republican Party), but was unsuccessful, coming in second in a five-way race.

== After the legislature ==
After leaving the Assembly, Markey went back to the practice of law in Milwaukee, where he had been practicing since 1939. In 1951, the Supreme Court of Wisconsin ruled that he and his brother Maurice (also a lawyer) had been guilty of unprofessional conduct. Four counts are contained in the complaint. They are that the defendants were guilty of unprofessional conduct in that they conspired and acted together:

1. To secure advantages to themselves to the prejudice of the interests of their clients;
2. To injure their clients' interests by threatening to withdraw, and withdrawing from, the defense of litigation, at the time set for the trial thereof, with the intent and purpose of forcing their clients to execute agreements to the advantage and benefit of the defendants;
3. To use for their own benefit and the benefit of others and against the interests of their former clients, information acquired from their clients in the course of their employment as attorneys;
4. To attempt to injure their former clients, after withdrawing as attorneys from a case set for trial, by disclosing to the attorney for the adverse party that they had information acquired by them as attorneys which could be made available to the adverse party upon the trial of such cause and which would assist in establishing the cause of the adverse party.

While they were not disbarred, they were reprimanded, and their licenses to practice were suspended until they paid the costs of the proceeding against them, which, the Court noted, "it appears will involve a considerable sum".
