= Hallquist =

Hallquist may refer to:

- Barbara Hallquist (born 1957), American tennis player
- Christine Hallquist (born 1956), American politician
- Stone Hallquist (1902–1981), American football player
- Hallquist Lake, lake in Carver County, Minnesota, United States
