= Ermenc =

Ermenc is a surname. Notable people with the surname include:

- Alenka Ermenc (born 1963), Slovenian military officer
- John Ermenc (1887–1946), American politician
