= Jerry Kleczka =

American politician (1943–2017)

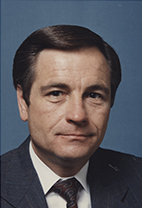

Member of the U.S. House of Representatives from Wisconsin's 4th district
- In office April 3, 1984 – January 3, 2005
- Preceded by: Clement Zablocki
- Succeeded by: Gwen Moore

Member of the Wisconsin Senate
- In office January 3, 1983 – April 3, 1984
- Preceded by: Kurt Frank
- Succeeded by: John Plewa
- Constituency: 7th district
- In office January 6, 1975 – January 3, 1983
- Preceded by: Casimir Kendziorski
- Succeeded by: John Norquist
- Constituency: 3rd district

Member of the Wisconsin State Assembly
- In office January 1, 1973 – January 6, 1975
- Preceded by: District established
- Succeeded by: Phillip James Tuczynski
- Constituency: 9th district
- In office January 6, 1969 – January 1, 1973
- Preceded by: Robert P. Kordus
- Succeeded by: District abolished
- Constituency: Milwaukee 14th district

Personal details
- Born: Gerald Daniel Kleczka; November 26, 1943 Milwaukee, Wisconsin, U.S.
- Died: October 8, 2017 (aged 73)
- Party: Democratic
- Spouse: Bonnie
- Education: University of Wisconsin–Milwaukee
- Occupation: Accountant

Gerald Daniel Kleczka (/klɛtʃkɑː/; November 26, 1943 – October 8, 2017) was an American politician and Democratic member of the United States House of Representatives from 1984 to 2005, representing Wisconsin's 4th congressional district. The district included the city of Milwaukee.

== Life and education ==
After graduating from Milwaukee's Don Bosco High School, in 1961, he attended the University of Wisconsin–Milwaukee for two years. Afterward, he served as an accountant and a member of the National Guard.

== Politics ==
Kleczka was elected to the Wisconsin State Assembly, serving from 1969 to 1974. Later, he was a member of the Wisconsin State Senate from 1975 to 1984. Kleczka was elected to the House in a special election following the death of Representative Clement J. Zablocki, defeating Milwaukee County District Attorney E. Michael McCann in the Democratic primary.

== Tenure in Congress ==
While in Congress, Kleczka was a member of the United States House Committee on Ways and Means and later the United States House Committee on the Budget. He was known to be one of the more liberal members of Congress and helped to secure money for many programs for education, poverty relief, and housing improvements.

For his first 10-and-a-half terms, Kleczka represented a district that included most of the southern half of Milwaukee, as well as part of eastern Waukesha County. After the 2000 census, his district was merged with the neighboring 5th District, covering downtown and north Milwaukee and represented by fellow Democrat Tom Barrett. The new 4th was a more compact district located solely in Milwaukee County, and took in all of the city of Milwaukee; it was by far the most Democratic district in Wisconsin. Although it retained Kleczka's district number, it was geographically and demographically more Barrett's district. However, Barrett opted to run for governor, effectively handing the seat to Kleczka.

The pronunciation of Kleczka's name often proved baffling to the uninformed. Rep. Frank Annunzio (D-IL) repeatedly butchered it to the point that an exasperated Kleczka took to calling him "Rep. Annunciation".

=== Legal issues ===
Kleczka was arrested at least twice for drunk driving while in office. A 1995 arrest for drunken driving — his blood alcohol content was twice the legal limit in Virginia — led him to acknowledge his alcoholism and seek treatment. He credits religion as part of the reason for his recovery and continued to meet regularly with fellow recovering alcoholics.

== Retirement and death ==
Kleczka announced his retirement in 2004, and did not run for reelection. He officially retired in January 2005 after ten terms in Congress, and was succeeded by State Senator Gwen Moore, also a Democrat.

After Kleczka retired, he moved to Middleton, Wisconsin, with his wife. Kleczka died on October 8, 2017, from natural causes at a care facility, in the Madison, Wisconsin area.

Wisconsin State Assembly
Preceded by Robert P. Kordus	Member of the Wisconsin State Assembly from the 14th Milwaukee County district 1969–1973	Succeeded by District abolished
Preceded by District created	Member of the Wisconsin State Assembly from the 9th district 1973–1975	Succeeded by Phillip James Tuczynski
Wisconsin Senate
Preceded by Casimir Kendziorski	Member of the Wisconsin Senate from the 3rd district 1975–1983	Succeeded by John Norquist
Preceded by Kurt Frank	Member of the Wisconsin Senate from the 7th district 1983–1984	Succeeded by John Plewa
U.S. House of Representatives
Preceded by Clement Zablocki	Member of the U.S. House of Representatives from Wisconsin's 4th congressional district 1984–2005	Succeeded by Gwen Moore
