= George L. Tews =

American politician (1883–1936)

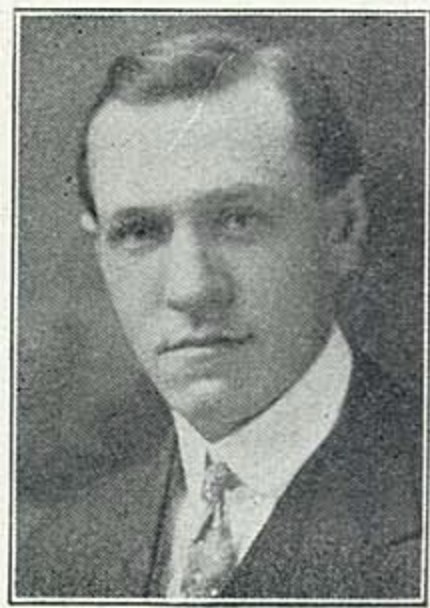
Wisconsin Socialist businessman and legislator George L. Tews

George L. Tews (September 25, 1883 – 1936) was a machinist, businessman and real estate broker from Milwaukee, Wisconsin, who served three non-continuous terms (1915–1916; 1927–1928; and 1931–32) as a Socialist member of the Wisconsin State Assembly.

== Background ==
Tews was born September 25, 1883, on Jones Island, Milwaukee. He was educated in the Milwaukee Public Schools and at a business institute. He served as a member of the Milwaukee crew of the United States Life-Saving Service (a predecessor to the United States Coast Guard), and later apprenticed as a machinist. He worked as a clerk in several large machine shops in Milwaukee until 1911, when he was appointed storekeeper by the new Socialist administration of the City of Milwaukee, and installed a storekeeping system for the city. (He had been an active Socialist "all his life.") He later went into a wholesale and retail seafood business with his brother William.

== Public service ==
He served one term as treasurer for district school No. 16 (for the Towns of Greenfield and Wauwatosa). He was first elected to the Assembly in 1914 for the 14th Milwaukee County district (14th and 24th Wards of the City of Milwaukee) to succeed fellow Socialist Martin Gorecki, who was not running for re-election. Tews received 1,254 votes to 1,022 votes for Democrat John A. Kroszewski, and 501 for Republican Fred J. Thorson. He was assigned to the standing committee on transportation.

Tews did not run for re-election in 1916, and was succeeded by Democrat Thomas Szewczykowski.

In 1926, Tews (who was still in the wholesale seafood business and was also working as an insurance broker) was elected for the Fifth Milwaukee County district (5th and 12th Wards) to succeed Republican Julius Jensen (who was not running for re-election). Tews won 1,602 to 1547 for Democrat Lewis E. Battger. He was assigned to the committee on commerce and manufactures. In 1928 he did not run for election, and was succeeded by Republican Joseph Przybylski.

In 1930, now working simply as a real estate broker, he was elected from the 11th Milwaukee County district (11th and 24th Wards) to succeed Republican Alex Chmurski, who had lost the Republican nomination to John C. Bauer. Tews won 3016 votes to 2228 for Bauer, 723 for Democrat George H. Buer, and 694 for Joseph Chonowski (who had also been a candidate in the Republican primary); and was assigned to the committees on transportation and on statutory revision. In 1932 Tews lost his bid for re-election to Democrat Martin Franzkowiak, who polled 6941 votes to Tews' 3442, 2091 for Republican Harry E. Shelminiak, and 58 for Independent Albert Krawczyk.

== "A Socialist with the brains knocked out" ==
During a January 5, 1932, debate on unemployment compensation and how to fund it, Tews argued for the Socialist bill and against the Progressive substitute, stating that a Progressive was "a Socialist with the brains knocked out" (although the Socialists eventually supported the bill, as better than nothing).; this line would re-appear in similar debates during the January session.
