= John Szymarek =

American politician

John H. Szymarek (March 4, 1875 - ?) was an American businessman from Milwaukee, Wisconsin who served two terms (1903-1906) as a Democratic member of the Wisconsin State Assembly.

== Background ==
Szymarek was born in Poland on March 4, 1875, and came to Wisconsin in 1879. He was educated in parochial schools and at Marquette College, from which he graduated in 1895. For several years he worked for the Farmers' Lumber Company of Milwaukee, and then became city agent for the Milwaukee Brewing Company, and went into the real estate business.

== Public office ==
Szymarek was first elected to the assembly in 1902 to represent the 14th Milwaukee County assembly district (the 14th Ward of the City of Milwaukee), with 1653 votes, to 695 for Republican Constantine Matuazenski, 467 for Socialist Joseph Lapinski, and 13 for independent Carl Bartsch (Democratic incumbent August Gawin was not a candidate for re-election). He was assigned to the standing committees on military affairs, and on engrossed bills.

He was re-elected in 1904, with 1623 votes to 975 for Socialist Martin Gorecki and 855 for Republican John J. Derwort. His subsequent official biography states that he had now gone into the real estate business, but does not say in what capacity. He was not a candidate for re-election in 1906, and was succeeded by fellow Democrat Joseph Domachowski.

He made a comeback attempt in 1910, running to succeed Domachowski (who was not a candidate for re-election that year). He lost to Socialist Michael Katzban, who polled 1,328 votes, to 1,184 for Szymarek and 440 for Republican Leo Kelpinski.

== After the Assembly ==
In 1913, he was working as a street inspector for the City of Milwaukee.
