= Martin Franzkowiak =

American politician (1870–1968)

Martin Franzkowiak (November 10, 1870 – October 1968) was a grocer from Milwaukee, Wisconsin, who served three terms as a Democratic member of the Wisconsin State Assembly.

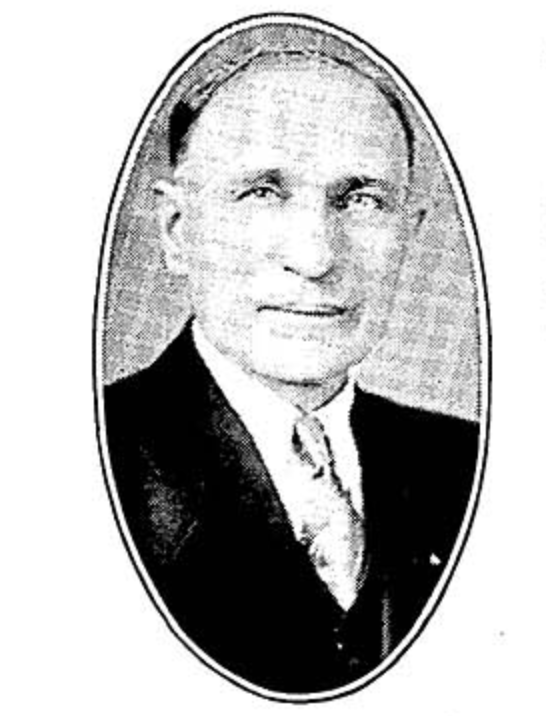
Martin B. Franzkowiak, Wisconsin legislator

== Background ==
Franzkowiak was born on November 10, 1870, in Poland. He moved to Milwaukee in 1878, and was educated in that city's parochial schools. He spent 22 years working in various capacities at the Kieckhefer Brothers Company (a tinware manufacturer), and in 1905 became a retail grocer; he would not retire until 1932.

In 1913, Franzkowiak was a founding organizer of the Federation Life Insurance Company of America (a mutual insurance company), serving as a director for four years and as its treasurer for six, and for fifteen years was the organization's local secretary. In 1924 he helped organize the Star Building and Loan Association, and spent three years as a director thereof, and three years as its president.

== Political career ==
Franzkowiak first sought public office in 1930, running in the Democratic primary for Wisconsin's 3rd State Senate district; he came in second, with 196 votes to 374 for Walter Nowicki.

He had retired as a grocer by the time he was first elected to the State Assembly from the 11th Milwaukee County district (the City of Milwaukee's 11th and 24th wards) in 1932. Unopposed in the Democratic primary, he won an absolute majority in the four-way general election, garnering 6941 votes to 3442 for Socialist incumbent George L. Tews, 2091 for Republican Harry Shalminiak, and 58 for independent Albert Krawczyk. He was assigned to the standing committees on conservation and education. After eking out a plurality in an eight-way primary in 1934, he was re-elected with 3813 votes, to 2498 for Socialist Herman Wartchow, 2028 for former Republican assemblyman Alex Chmurski (now running as a Progressive), 600 for Republican Harold Sahlin, and 52 for Krawczyk. He moved to the committee on printing. In 1936, he once more won a plurality in an eight-way primary, albeit by a narrower margin; and was re-elected, with 6,303 votes to 5,014 for Progressive Edward Wolski, 1,247 for Republican Agnes Malich, and 946 for "Independent Democrat" Edward Froncek, whom he had defeated in the primary. He became chairman of the committee on enrolled bills, and also served on the committee on municipalities. In 1938, after winning narrowly in a seven-way primary, he lost his seat in a tight race, defeated by Socialist Clement Stachowiak (running on the Progressive ballot line), who drew 3,832 votes to Franzkowiak's 3,324, Republican Albert Sargewitz' 2,186, "Independent Democrat" Valentine Kujawa's 1,622 votes (again, this was somebody he had already defeated in the primary) and 269 votes for John J. Kowalski of the Union Party.

He sought to re-gain his position in the 1940 primary election, but lost the nomination to Ervin J. Ryczek, who would go on to defeat Stachowiak in the general election. He would run unsuccessfully for his party's nomination, either in his old Assembly district or the 3rd Senate District, in 1942, 1944, 1946, 1948, 1949, 1952, 1954, and 1958.

== Personal life ==
According to the 1940 United States Census, he had a wife Catherine (age 66), two sons aged 31 and 25, and a daughter aged 27.

He is shown in the Social Security Death Index as dying in October 1968.
