= Michael Katzban =

American politician

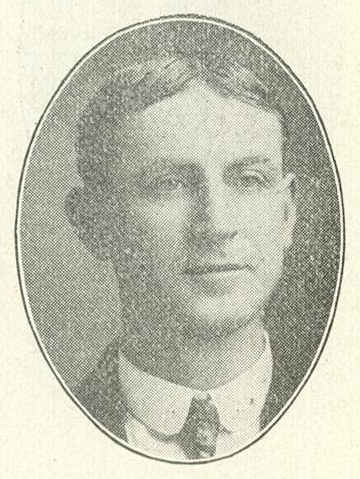
Katzban's official State Assembly portrait, 1911

Michael Katzban (September 11, 1876 – July 3, 1962) was a core molder and insurance salesman from Milwaukee, Wisconsin who served one term as a Socialist member of the Wisconsin State Assembly.

== Background ==
Katzban was born in Lemont, in Cook County, Illinois, on September 11, 1876. He came to Milwaukee in 1886, attended public and parochial schools, and learned the trade of core molder, which he continued to practice. He joined the Molders Union around 1898, and held various offices in it.

== Legislative service and political activity ==
He was elected to the Assembly's Fourteenth Milwaukee County district (the 14th Ward of the City of Milwaukee in 1910 to succeed Democrat Joseph Domachowski (who was not a candidate for re-election). Katzban earned 1,328 votes, to 1,184 for former Democratic Assemblyman John Szymarek and 440 for Republican Leo Kelpinski. He was assigned to the standing committees on city living conditions and on vocational education.

In 1912, after a redistricting, he ran for the Assembly in the newly-redrawn Eighth Milwaukee County district, losing to Democrat Jacob J. Litza, Jr., with 1298 votes for Litza, 1065 for Katzban, and 424 for Republican Charles Strasberger.

He served as a deputy sheriff in Milwaukee County in 1912, and in 1915-1916.

He ran once more for the Assembly from the Eighth District in 1930, coming in second with 1,912 votes to 3,041 for Republican Ben Wiczynski and 1641 for Democratic incumbent Mary O. Kryszak.

In 1945, he was elected to the executive committee of the Milwaukee County Socialist Party. In 1950, he was appointed as a Socialist member of the City of Milwaukee's Election Commission, and served a six-year term. In 1954, he was elected to the Party's state executive committee.

== Personal life and death ==
At the time of his death in 1962, he had been an insurance salesman for twenty years. He left behind a widow, Rose, and a son, John Katzban, who was village manager for the Village of Whitefish Bay, Wisconsin.
