= Thad F. Wasielewski =

American lawyer, politician (1904–1976)

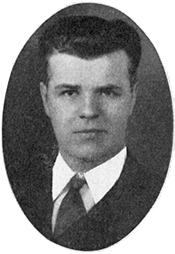

Member of the U.S. House of Representatives from Wisconsin's 4th district
- In office January 3, 1941 – January 3, 1947
- Preceded by: John C. Schafer
- Succeeded by: John C. Brophy

Personal details
- Born: December 2, 1904 Milwaukee, Wisconsin, U.S.
- Died: April 25, 1976 (aged 71) Milwaukee, Wisconsin, U.S.
- Resting place: St. Adalbert Cemetery, Milwaukee
- Party: Democratic
- Spouse: Stephanie M. Gorak (m. 1939–1976)
- Education: University of Michigan; Marquette University Law School
- Profession: Lawyer, politician

Thaddeus Francis Boleslaw Wasielewski (December 2, 1904 – April 25, 1976) was an American lawyer and Democratic politician from Milwaukee, Wisconsin. He served three terms in the U.S. House of Representatives, representing the southern half of Milwaukee County from 1941 to 1947.

== Background ==
Thad F. Wasielewski was born in Milwaukee, son of Dr. Frank S. and Felicia H. (Baranowski) Wasielewski. He attended SS. Cyril and Methodius Parochial School and South Division High School, and received degrees from the University of Michigan (B.A., 1927) and from Marquette University Law School (J.D., 1931) and practiced law in Milwaukee. On 28 October 1939, he married Stephanie M. Gorak, daughter of Mr. and Mrs. Thomas Gorak of Milwaukee. He was active in many local Polish-American organizations and would make campaign speeches both in English and in the Polish language.

== Congress ==
In 1938, Wasielewski unseated incumbent Congressman Raymond Joseph Cannon in the Democratic primary for Wisconsin's 4th congressional district, but was narrowly defeated in turn by a former incumbent, Republican John Schafer, with 33,559 votes (31.40%), to Schafer's 34,196 (32.00%), Progressive nominee Paul Gauer's 30,817 (28.84%), 7,498 votes (7.02%) for Cannon (who ran as an independent) and 794 votes (0.74%) for a Union Party candidate.

Wasielewski was again nominated in 1940, and this time was elected to the 77th Congress. Wasielewski was an interventionist (supported American entry into World War II) in a largely isolationist state. He voted in favor of both the 1941 Lend Lease Act to send more military aid to Great Britain, and the 1944 Lend Lease Act as well. He served as part of the 77th, 78th and 79th Congresses. He lost the Democratic nomination in 1946 to Edmund Bobrowicz (he was accused of voting for anti-labor legislation), then ran unsuccessfully for his seat as an independent when accusations surfaced that Bobrowicz was a Communist Party member. As a result, they both lost to Republican John C. Brophy, who drew 49,144 votes to Bobrowicz' 44,398, Wasielewski's 38.502, and Socialist George Helberg's 2,470.

== After Congress ==
Wasielewski returned to private life, although he served as a delegate to the 1948 Democratic National Convention and would make one more unsuccessful try for the Democratic nomination in 1950, losing 27,717 to 10,692 in an effort to unseat incumbent Clement Zablocki. He practiced law until his death in 1976.

His papers are owned by the Wisconsin Historical Society, and are housed in the University of Wisconsin–Milwaukee's Golda Meir Library Archives Department, in the Milwaukee Area Research Center.

U.S. House of Representatives
Preceded by John C. Schafer	Member of the U.S. House of Representatives from Wisconsin's 4th congressional district 1941 – 1947	Succeeded by John C. Brophy
