= Thomas Szewczykowski =

American politician

Thomas Szewczykowski (February 14, 1881 – April 14, 1947) was a moulder and saloonkeeper from Milwaukee, Wisconsin who served one term as a Democratic member of the Wisconsin State Assembly from Milwaukee County.

== Background ==
Szewczykowski was born in Port Colborne, Ontario, Canada of parents who had been born in German Poland. He came to Milwaukee with his parents at the age of three years, and received his early education in the city's parochial schools. He then began learning the moulders' trade, and became a foreman in one of the largest manufacturing concerns in the state. He later entered the saloon and grocery business.

== Elective office ==
Szewczykowski served on the Milwaukee Common Council from 1911 to 1914, and was a candidate for state senator for the Seventh District in 1914, losing in a three-way race, with 2,586 votes to 2,763 for Republican Daniel B. Starkey and 3,631 votes for the winner, Socialist Louis A. Arnold. He was elected to the Assembly in 1916 for the 14th Milwaukee County district (14th and 24th Wards of the City of Milwaukee) to succeed Socialist George L. Tews, who was not running for re-election. He won election by 29 votes over Socialist former assemblyman Frederick Brockhausen, with 1496 votes against 1467 votes for Brockhausen and 28 votes for Prohibitionist H. C. Schlauer.

Szewczykowski did not run for re-election in 1918, and was succeeded by Socialist John Masiakowski.
