= Frederick Brockhausen =

American politician (1858–1929)

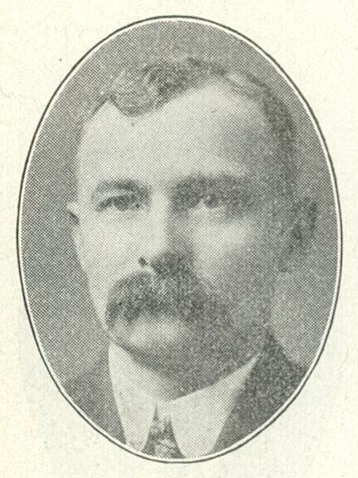
- Brockhausen c. 1911

Member of the Wisconsin State Assembly from the Milwaukee 11th district
- In office January 2, 1905 – January 6, 1913
- Preceded by: Frank Haderer
- Succeeded by: James Vint

Personal details
- Born: Frederick Carl Brockhausen, Jr. May 20, 1858 Fredericia, Denmark
- Died: June 16, 1929 (aged 71) Milwaukee, Wisconsin
- Party: Socialist
- Occupation: Cigar maker, politician

Frederick Carl Brockhausen, Jr. (May 20, 1858 – June 16, 1929) was a cigar maker and trade union activist from Milwaukee, Wisconsin who spent four terms as a Socialist member of the Wisconsin State Assembly.

== Background ==
Brockhausen was born in Fredericia, Denmark on May 20, 1858. He attended public schools and became a journeyman cigar maker in 1877. While working on the German island of Föhr in North Frisia, he joined both the Social Democratic Party and the cigarmakers' union. He migrated to the United States in 1879, and to Milwaukee soon after; but later spent some time in New York, Iowa, Montana, Chippewa Falls, Wisconsin, and St. Paul, Minnesota, before finally settling permanently in Milwaukee in 1894. He joined the Cigar Makers' International Union in 1890 while working in St. Paul, and in 1897, after participating in the People's Party during the 1896 election, joined the Milwaukee branch of the Social Democracy of America. He was an associate of fellow Socialist Frank J. Weber in the early years of the Wisconsin State Federation of Labor, and served as its unpaid secretary-treasurer from 1900 to 1912; the Wisconsin Historical Society's Dictionary of Wisconsin History describes him as "in effect, its executive officer and legislative representative". In 1903 he was among the leaders of the push for worker's compensation: statutory recognition of an injured worker's right to compensation without court action.

== Legislative service ==
He was first elected to the Assembly from Milwaukee County's 11th Assembly district (the 11th Ward of the City of Milwaukee) in 1904, defeating former Assemblyman Republican Herman Pomrening by 9 votes in a three-way race, with 1924 votes for Brockhausen, 1915 for Pomrening, and 1163 for Democrat Charles Miksch. (Democratic incumbent Frank Haderer, who had ousted Pomrening in 1902, was not a candidate.) Brockhausen was assigned to the standing committee on manufactures. He was more easily re-elected in 1906, and remained on what was now the committee on manufactures and labor. In 1908, with no Republican in the race, he defeated Miksch 1575 to 1288, and moved to the committee on municipalities. In 1910, with the Socialists sweeping Milwaukee's elections, he won 1983 votes to a total of 998 for his three opponents combined. He moved to the committees on taxation, on charitable and penal institutions, and the newly created committee on workmen's compensation. This session of the Legislature was to see worker's compensation enacted into law in 1911, the first such statute in the United States.

== After the Assembly ==
In 1912, his Assembly district had been merged with part of that represented by fellow Socialist James Vint. Rather than run against Vint (who won re-election) he ran for the Wisconsin State Senate, losing to Democrat Alexander E. Martin by a narrow margin in a five-way race. After his loss, he relinquished his union and party responsibilities to devote his time to his cigar business, but retained his Socialist and labor zeal.

In 1916 he ran again for the Assembly's 14th Milwaukee County district, losing by 29 votes to Democrat Thomas Szewczykowski.

He served on the State Council of Defense (chairman of its labor committee) during World War I, and on the board of trustees of the Milwaukee County Institutions (1921–1929). He died in Milwaukee on June 16, 1929. His papers are in the collections of the Wisconsin Historical Society.
