= John N. Kaiser =

American politician (1899–1978)

John N. Kaiser (May 16, 1899 – January 4, 1978) was an American salesman from Milwaukee, Wisconsin who served two terms (1933–1936) as a Democratic member of the Wisconsin State Assembly from the 6th Milwaukee County district. He succeeded, and was in turn succeeded by, Socialist Ben Rubin.

== Background ==
Kaiser was born May 16, 1899, in Milwaukee. He graduated from St. Ann's Parochial School in 1914, and worked first for the Mayer Boot and Shoe Company; was employed by the Milwaukee Electric Railway and Light Company for ten years; and then became a salesman for various companies. He was a member of the Wisconsin National Guard and upon the outbreak of World War I served in the United States Army, spending sixteen months in France as part of the "Iron Brigade" of the Thirty-Second Infantry Division.

== Assembly service ==
In 1930 Kaiser was the Democratic candidate for the Assembly's Sixth Milwaukee County district (the Sixth Ward of the City of Milwaukee) against Republican incumbent Frederick W. Cords; he drew 350 votes, to 1389 votes for Socialist Ben Rubin, 927 votes for Cords, and 55 for Lee Talton.

In 1932 Rubin was a candidate for re-election, again facing Cords and Kaiser and two independents. This time Kaiser (with Franklin D. Roosevelt at the top of the Democratic ticket) was the victor, with 2240 votes to Rubin's 2130, Cord's 1412, and another 129 for the two independents.

In 1934, Rubin came within somewhere between nine and twenty-seven votes of unseating Kaiser. 104 paper ballots were lost before a recount was held, with a janitor later admitting he'd burned them as wastepaper. The final official count was 1289 for Kaiser (Democrat), 1262 for Rubin (Socialist), 1002 for Fred G. Miller (Progressive), 638 for Frederick Petersen (Republican), and 49 for an independent and "scattering".

In 1936, Rubin again faced Kaiser in the general election, this time nominally as a Progressive (there were no official "Socialist" candidates during this era of Progressive/Socialist "federation" tickets, and no Socialist primary). Rubin unseated Kaiser with 3576 votes, to Kaiser's 2607 and Republican Paul Coleman's 1008.
