= Frederick W. Cords Jr. =

American politician (1903–1972)

Frederick W. Cords Jr. (December 27, 1903 - November 25, 1972) was an American electrical engineer from Milwaukee, Wisconsin who served one term as a Republican member of the Wisconsin State Assembly.

== Background ==
Cords was born December 27, 1903, in the city of Milwaukee, the son of Fred W. Cords, Sr., former clerk of the Milwaukee County circuit court and Augusta H. (Vogt) Cords. He was educated in the Milwaukee Public Schools, including the Highland Avenue School, and Riverside High School, and graduated from Milwaukee School of Engineering and a "school of finance" in New York City. He became an electrical engineer (doing both contracting and consulting) and an associate member of the American Institute of Electrical Engineers.

== Assembly service ==
Cords was elected to the Assembly's Sixth Milwaukee County district (the Sixth Ward of the City of Milwaukee), in 1928. He first defeated Frederick Petersen, former state representative from the district, in the Republican primary election; and in the general election polled 1380 votes, defeating Democrat Gene Ackerman, who received 936 votes, and Socialist Fred Breuhahn, who received 896 votes. He was assigned to the standing committee on elections.

In 1930 Cords had first to achieve a plurality in a five-way primary (Petersen was again one of his challengers). He was unseated in the general election by Socialist Ben Rubin, who drew 1389 votes, to Cords' 927 votes, with 350 for Democrat John N. Kaiser, and 55 for Lee Talton.

In 1932 Cords had once more to achieve a plurality in a five-way primary (Petersen was again one of his challengers) in order to challenge Rubin, who was a candidate for re-election. In the general election, Cords again faced Rubin, Kaiser and two new independents (one was Petersen, who polled only 37 votes). This time Kaiser (with Franklin D. Roosevelt at the top of the Democratic ticket) was the victor, with 2240 votes to Cords' 1412, Rubin's 2130, and another 129 for the two independents.
