= Frank Haderer =

American politician

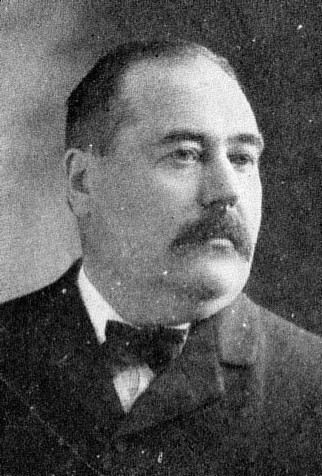
Frank Haderer's photo, from the 1903 edition of the Wisconsin Blue Book.

Frank Haderer (1859–1912) was an American hardware dealer from Milwaukee, Wisconsin, who served two terms as a Democratic member of the Wisconsin State Assembly from Milwaukee County.

== Background ==
Haderer was born on March 1, 1859, in Milwaukee, and received a common school education. He stayed in Milwaukee, where he became a hardware dealer. He was elected as a school commissioner in 1884.

== Legislative career ==
Hader was first elected to the Assembly in 1885 from the 8th Milwaukee County Assembly district (the 8th, 11th and 14th Wards of the City of Milwaukee), receiving 2,206 votes to 1,794 for Republican John L. Burnham and 29 for Prohibitionist 0. 0. Storle (Democratic incumbent John Fellenz was not a candidate). He did not run for re-election, and was succeeded by Populist Benjamin Charles Garside.

In 1902, he was again elected to the Assembly, from what was now the 11th Milwaukee County district (the 11th Ward of the City of Milwaukee), with 1,139 votes to 1,112 for incumbent Republican Herman Pomrening, 1,065 for Socialist Edmund T. Melins and 28 for independent Joseph Deikert. He was not a candidate for re-election in 1904, and was succeeded by Socialist Frederick Brockhausen.

Haderer died at the age of 53 on June 22, 1912, and is interred at the Holy Trinity Cemetery in Milwaukee.
