= John Kaiser =

John Kaiser may refer to:

- John Kaiser (American football) (born 1962), American football player
- John Anthony Kaiser (1932–2000), Roman Catholic priest murdered in Kenya
- John N. Kaiser (1899–?), member of the Wisconsin State Assembly
