= Edmund V. Bobrowicz =

American politician (1919–2003)

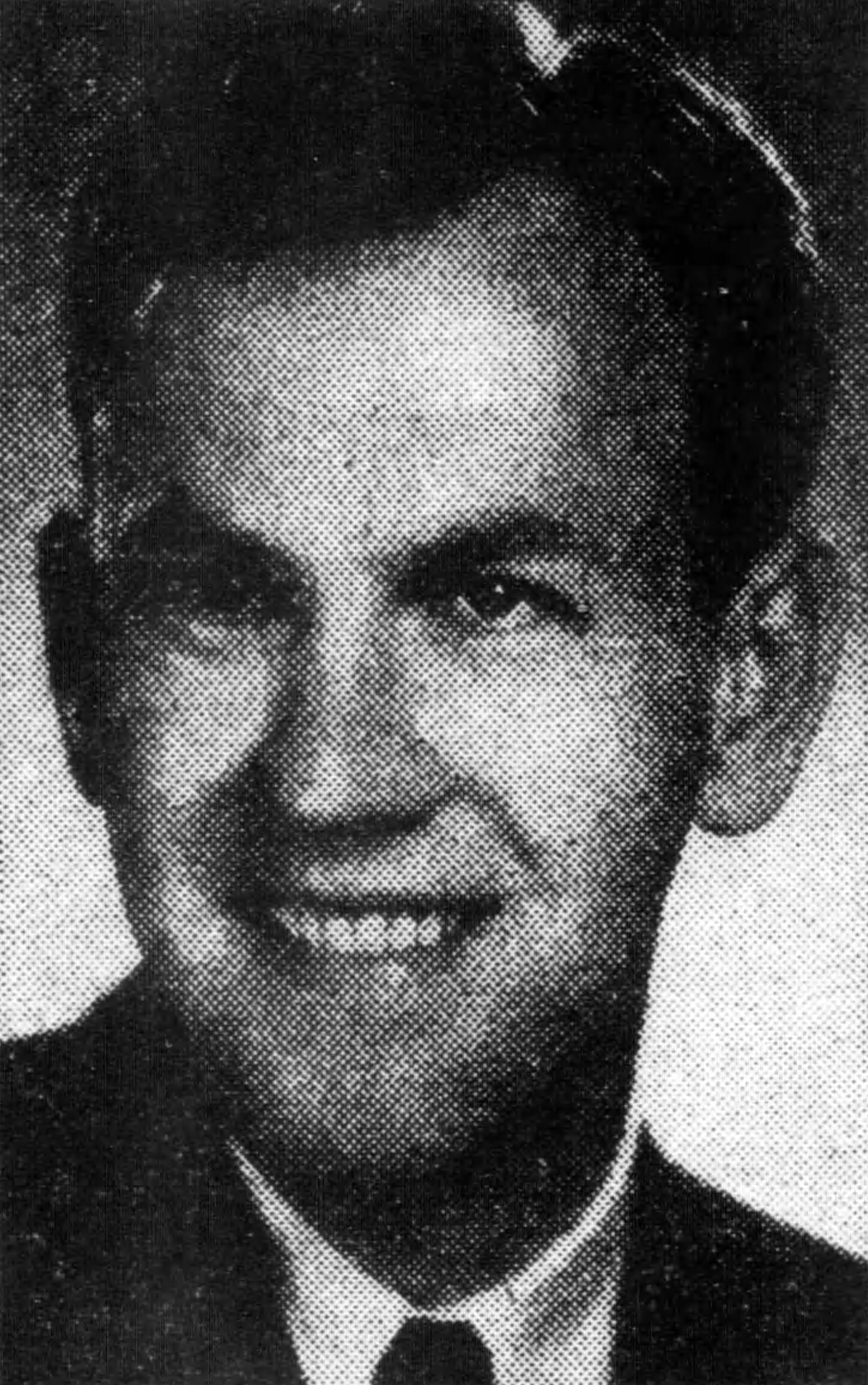
- Bobrowicz c. 1946

Personal details
- Born: Edmund Victor Bobrowicz; May 1, 1919 Milwaukee, Wisconsin, U.S.
- Died: March 16, 2003 (aged 83) Green Bay, Wisconsin, U.S.
- Resting place: St. Adalbert's Cemetery, Milwaukee
- Party: Democratic; Progressive (1948)
- Spouse: Dorothy A. Douglas (m. 1942; died 2014)
- Children: Victor Douglas Bobrowicz; (b. 1943; died 2005); Spring (Truckey)
- Profession: Union organizer, politician

Military service
- Allegiance: United States
- Branch/service: United States Army
- Years of service: 1943–1945
- Battles/wars: World War II; Asiatic-Pacific Theater

Edmund Victor Bobrowicz (May 1, 1919 – March 16, 2003) was an American trade union activist and politician from Milwaukee, Wisconsin. He ran for the U.S. House of Representatives in 1946, launching a successful primary challenge against incumbent Democratic representative Thaddeus Wasielewski, but after the primary he was accused of being a secret Communist, and lost the general election to Republican John C. Brophy.

== Biography ==
Bobrowicz was born in Milwaukee, Wisconsin, the son of Polish immigrants. He served in the Army during the Second World War, in the South Pacific. In 1946, Bobrowicz (then working as a union organizer) ran successfully for the Democratic nomination for Wisconsin's 4th congressional district, ousting incumbent Representative Thaddeus Wasielewski, who was accused of voting for anti-labor legislation).

Before the general election, however, Bobrowicz was accused by the Milwaukee Journal of secretly being a Communist and was subsequently expelled from the Democratic Party. Wasielewski, hoping to regain his seat, re-entered the race as an independent, but the two split the Democratic vote, allowing Republican John C. Brophy to win, with 49,144 votes to Bobrowicz' 44,398, Wasielewski's 38.502, and Socialist George Helberg's 2,470.

Bobrowicz subsequently left politics and became a union official, working for 35 years as a representative of the International Fur & Leather Workers Union and the Amalgamated Meat Cutters until his retirement in 1977. In 1987, he and his wife moved to Green Bay to be closer to family. He died at his home in Green Bay in 2003.

== Electoral history ==
Wisconsin's 4th Congressional District Election, 1946
Party	Candidate	Votes	%	±%
Democratic Primary, August 13, 1946
Democratic	Edmund V. Bobrowicz	11,998	52.83%	
Democratic	Thaddeus Wasielewski (incumbent)	10,713	47.17%	
Plurality		1,285	5.66%	
Total votes		22,711	100.0%	
General Election, November 5, 1946
Republican	John C. Brophy	49,144	36.53%	+2.59%
Democratic	Edmund V. Bobrowicz	44,398	33.01%	−30.49%
Independent Democrat	Thaddeus Wasielewski (incumbent)	38,502	28.62%	
Socialist	George E. Helberg	2,470	1.84%	−0.72%
Plurality		4,746	3.53%	-26.02%
Total votes		134,514	100.0%	-17.54%
Republican gain from Democratic		Swing	33.08%	

Wisconsin's 4th Congressional District Election, 1948
Party	Candidate	Votes	%	±%
General Election, November 2, 1948
Democratic	Clement J. Zablocki	89,391	55.89%	+22.89%
Republican	John C. Brophy (incumbent)	63,161	39.49%	+2.96%
Progressive	Edmund V. Bobrowicz	5,051	3.16%	
Socialist	Clement Stachowiak	2,326	1.45%	−0.38%
Plurality		26,230	16.40%	+12.87%
Total votes		159,929	100.0%	+18.89%
Democratic gain from Republican		Swing	19.93%	
