= St. Adalbert Cemetery (Milwaukee) =

Catholic cemetery in Milwaukee, Wisconsin, US

- Interactive map of St. Adalbert Cemetery

Details
- Established: December 9, 1888
- Location: 3801 S 6th St, Milwaukee, Wisconsin
- Country: US
- Coordinates: 42.975651°N 87.919983°W
- Type: Catholic cemetery
- Size: 98 acres (40 ha)
- No. of graves: 63,000 (estimated)
- No. of interments: 19,000 (estiamted)
- Website: Website
- Find a Grave: St. Adalbert Cemetery

St. Adalbert Cemetery is a historic Catholic cemetery traditionally used by the Polish American minority population in Milwaukee, Wisconsin. The cemetery was originally consecrated as St. Adalbert Cemetery in 1888 after the land was purchased by the Archdiocese of Milwaukee; for the first several decades, the cemetery was informally referred to as Polish Union Cemetery, as it was a shared cemetery serving several Milwaukee Polish Catholic parishes. The name St. Adalbert Cemetery took over common usage under the leadership of Archbishop Sebastian Gebhard Messmer in the early 20th century.

The 98 acres (40 ha) site contains approximately 64,000 graves and 19,000 other interments, such as crypts and niches. It is the final resting place for most of the city's notable Polish American figures.

== History ==
The original 30 acres of the cemetery was purchased by Archbishop Michael Heiss on land directly adjacent to the existing Holy Trinity Catholic Cemetery, in what was then the town of Lake, Wisconsin. The cemetery was consecrated as St. Adalbert Cemetery on December 9, 1888.

Shortly after its establishment, the cemetery was plagued by accusations that their gravedigger, John Markewicz, had been digging improper shallow graves and occasionally burying multiple people in a single grave. Markewicz, who had previously worked at the Holy Trinity Cemetery, was also accused of the same practice at that cemetery.

Through the first half of the 20th century, the Archdiocese made several purchases of adjacent land, ultimately expanding the cemetery to 98 acres.

== Notable interments ==
- Edmund V. Bobrowicz, union organizer and politician
- Fabian Gaffke, professional baseball player
- Casimir Kendziorski, state senator
- John C. Kleczka, U.S. representative
- Alan Kulwicki, auto racing driver
- Al Simmons, professional baseball player
- Thad F. Wasielewski, U.S. representative
- Clement Zablocki, U.S. representative

== See also ==
- St. Adalbert's Church (Milwaukee)
