= John Masiakowski =

American politician

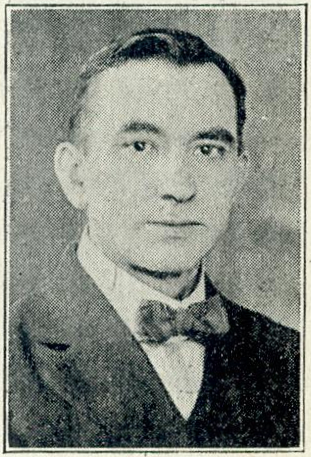
Masiakowski's official State Assembly portrait, 1919

John Masiakowski (August 31, 1874 – November 15, 1936) was an American stationer from Milwaukee, Wisconsin who served one term as a Socialist member of the Wisconsin State Assembly for the 14th Milwaukee County district (14th and 24th wards of the City of Milwaukee).

== Background ==
Masiakowski was born in 1874 in Milwaukee to Polish immigrant parents Ludwik Masiakowski and Maryanna Brzezińska. He attended parochial school and public school of the twelfth ward. He enlisted in the Hospital Corps of the United States Army, and served three years during the Spanish–American War. He served for two years as a deputy sheriff, and at the time of his election to the Assembly had been operating a school supply and confectionery store.

== Assembly service ==
Masiakowski had never held any public office (except that in 1917 he was appointed by Mayor of Milwaukee Dan Hoan as commissioner of the Community Christmas Board) until elected to the Assembly in 1918 to succeed Democratic incumbent Thomas Szewczykowski (who did not run for re-election). He received 1,239 votes to 1,086 for Republican Klemens Borucki and 1,020 for Democrat Frank Krempinski. He was assigned to the standing committee on elections.

He did not run for re-election in 1920, and was succeeded by fellow Socialist Stephen Stolowski.
