= Stephen Stolowski =

American printer and politician (1893–?)

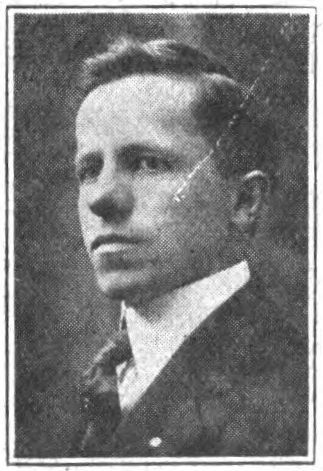
Stolowski's official State Assembly portrait, 1921

Stephen S. Stolowski (August 17, 1893 – ?) was an American printer from Milwaukee who served one term as a Socialist member of the Wisconsin State Assembly for the 14th Milwaukee County district (14th and 24th wards of the City of Milwaukee).

== Background ==
Stolowski was born in Milwaukee on August 17, 1893. He was educated in the parochial and public schools and also studied economics in the night school of the University of Wisconsin-Extension Division. He became a printer by trade.

== Assembly service ==
Stolowski had never held any public office until elected to the Assembly in 1920 to succeed Socialist incumbent John Masiakowski (who did not run for re-election). He received 2,800 votes to 2,169 for Republican Klemens Boruki and 1,208 for Democrat Alex Gramza. He was assigned to the standing committee on state affairs.

The Assembly was redistricted in 1920, and his wards were split between the new 8th and 11th Milwaukee County districts respectively. Stolowski did not run for re-election in 1922; both districts elected Socialists (John Polakowski (legislator) and Olaf C. Olsen).
