= Cleveland Colbert =

African American community activist, civil rights activist (1906–1962)

Cleveland Moland Colbert (October 6, 1906–January 23, 1962) was an African American 20th-century community organizer, political candidate, and author. Colbert served as the president of the Afro American National Economical Society (AANES) in the 1940s. In 1942, Colbert was elected as the second African American to serve in Wisconsin State Assembly; he was declared the election winner and it later was overturned by a recount, the seat was given to Philip Markey.

== Biography ==
Colbert was born on October 6, 1906, in Old Spring Hill, Alabama, to parents Minnie Cook and George Moland Colbert. He and his family lived at 813 West Galena Street in Milwaukee's Bronzeville neighborhood. He had worked in many roles including as a musician, an upholsterer, a crane operator, and an aviator. For a few months the 1930s Colbert served against his will as an aviator in the Spanish Civil War, where he was supposed to be in contract for commercial flying.

In 1940, after he had returned to the United States, Colbert was the president of the Afro American National Economical Society (AANES). The AANES supported the African American community through encouraging industrial businesses, as well as serving the civic, charitable, and social welfare needs.

Colbert was active in local politics, he won the election primaries against three competitors. In October 1942, Colbert was initially certified as the election winner of the 5th district seat in Wisconsin, before the results were overturned. After a recount, Phillip Markey was declared the winner, winning only by a few votes (as little as 10 votes); and Colbert was given $200 USD for his expenses during the period of recount. Colbert was a Republican. Lucian H. Palmer was the first African American to serve as a member of the Wisconsin state legislature; and Colbert would have been the second, if the election recount had not unseated him. LeRoy Simmons subsequently became the second African American to serve in the Wisconsin House of Representatives.

He authored the book, The Afro-Americans’ Problems and Solution (1951; Dell and Dell Publishers). The book can be found in the Special Collections Department at the University of Wisconsin–Milwaukee.

== See also ==
- List of African-American officeholders (1900–1959)
