= William E. Jordan =

American politician (1883–1953)

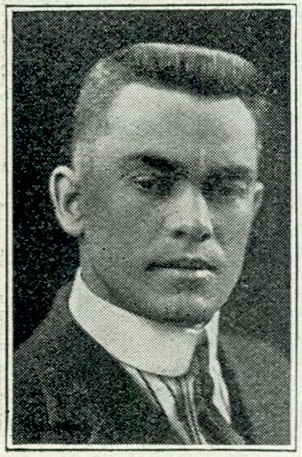
Jordan's official State Assembly portrait, 1917

William E. Jordan (September 10, 1883 – August 13, 1953) was a stenographer and bricklayer from Milwaukee, Wisconsin, who served three terms as a Socialist member of the Wisconsin State Assembly representing the 11th Milwaukee County district (11th and 23rd wards of the City of Milwaukee).

== Background ==
Jordan was born September 10, 1883, in East Prussia, Germany. He came with his parents to the United States in 1891. They settled in Milwaukee, where he attended the Milwaukee Public Schools. He attended a business college and worked four years as a stenographer. At age 21 he learned the bricklayers' trade, and became a member of the bricklayers union in October 1910.

== Assembly ==
Although active in his union, Jordan had never held a public office before being elected to the Assembly in November, 1916 to succeed fellow Socialist (and union activist) James Vint. Jordan received 2160 votes to 1985 for Democrat William A. Klug and 73 votes for Prohibitionist A. J. Jorgenson. He was assigned to the standing committee on municipalities.

He was re-elected in 1918, with 2753 votes to 1958 for Republican John L. Bieszk. He remained on the municipalities committee, and was also appointed to a special joint committee on pensions, annuities and retirement funds for teachers.

He ran unopposed in 1920 and stayed on the municipalities committee.

In 1922, after the Assembly was redistricted, Jordan's old 11th district was split between two districts. Jordan sought re-election in the new 10th Milwaukee County district (16th and 23rd wards), and was defeated by Republican John W. Eber, who received 3829 votes to Jordan's 2618. The 11th ward from the old district was encompassed in a revised 11th district, which elected Socialist Olaf C. Olsen.
