= Olaf C. Olsen =

American politician

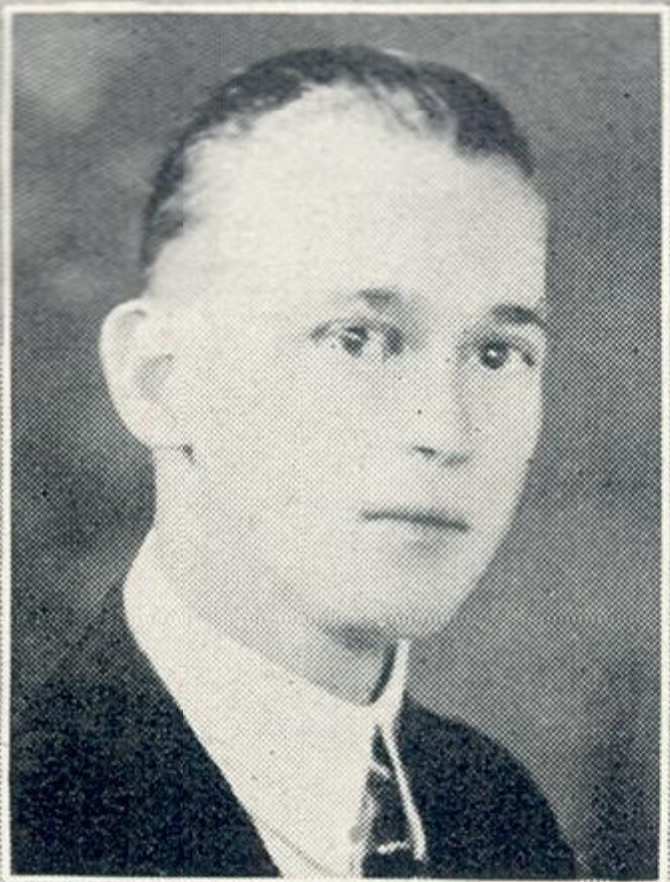
Olaf Olsen, Socialist legislator from Milwaukee

Olaf C. Olsen (February 26, 1899 - April 5, 1976) was a Socialist legislator from Milwaukee. He was a law student at Marquette University Law School in 1922 when he was elected to the first of his two terms in the Wisconsin State Assembly representing the 11th Milwaukee County district (11th and 24th wards of the City of Milwaukee).

== Background ==
Olsen was born February 26, 1899, in Milwaukee, Wisconsin. He graduated from South Division High School. He worked for the City of Milwaukee repairing traffic signals (a job on which he was injured, while working without safety devices). As of the 1923 opening of the legislature, he was attending the law school of Marquette University.

== Assembly ==
He had never held a public office before being elected to the assembly in November, 1922, receiving 3,643 votes to 887 for Democrat Alex J. Roselik (portions of this district had been represented by William E. Jordan and portions by Stephen Stolowski prior to reapportionment; both were Socialists). The youngest member of the legislature (he was just 22) he was appointed to the Assembly's standing committee on the judiciary.

In June 1924, he graduated from Marquette's law school, and was working as acting assistant chief examiner for the City of Milwaukee civil service commission. He was re-elected in November 1924, with 3817 votes to 3051 for Republican B. J. Adamkiewicz; by this time, his occupation was listed as "secretary".

He did not run for re-election in 1926, and was succeeded by fellow Socialist Elmer Baumann.

== Personal life ==
On July 28, 1923, he married Olive Wilson, an employee of the state tax commission. Olsen would die April 5, 1976. Olive died March 28, 1985.
