= John Ermenc =

American politician (1887–1946)

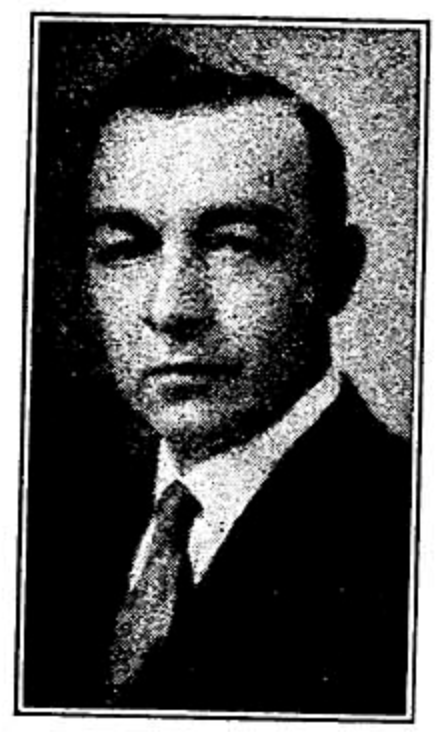
John Ermenc, Socialist businessman and Wisconsin legislator

John Ermenc (October 21, 1887 – November 29, 1946) was an American real estate and insurance broker from Milwaukee, Wisconsin who served one term as a Socialist member of the Wisconsin State Assembly.

== Background ==
Ermenc was born October 21, 1887, in Ljubno, Slovenia in the Austro-Hungarian Empire. He came to the United States in 1901, and finished his education at night school at the Milwaukee Technical School. Ermenc went into the real estate and insurance business, and organized the J. P. Z. Sloga fraternal society. He had held no previous public office prior to his election.

== Legislative service ==
Ermenc was elected to represent the Fifth Milwaukee County district (the 5th and 12th Wards of the City of Milwaukee), defeating Democratic incumbent State Representative Joseph Przybylski, with 1731 votes for Ermenc, 1565 for Republican Albert J. Loughlin, 1271 for Przybylski, and 472 for Stanley J. Tarnowski (who had lost the Republican primary and was running as an Independent). He was assigned to the standing committees on education and engrossed bills.

He ran for re-election in 1932, but was unseated by former Democratic State Representative Mary O. Kryszak in a redistricted Fifth district (now the 5th and 8th wards), with 7313 votes for Kryszak, 4020 for Ermenc, 2761 for Republican Harold C. Schultz, and 126 for Independent Joseph Plecha.
