= George Everts =

American politician (born 1842)

George Everts was a member of the Wisconsin State Assembly in 1883. He was later an unsuccessful candidate for the Assembly in 1888, losing to Benjamin Charles Garside. Additionally, he had been town clerk of Granville, Wisconsin, and a county supervisor of Milwaukee County, Wisconsin. He was a Democrat. Everts was born on August 8, 1842, in Granville.
