= Elmer Baumann =

American politician

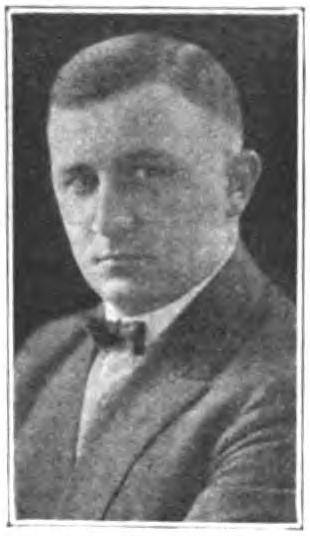
Baumann's official State Assembly portrait, 1927

Elmer H. Baumann (born February 15, 1902) was an American electrician from Milwaukee who served one term (1927–1928) as a Socialist member of the Wisconsin State Assembly representing Milwaukee County's 11th Assembly district (the 11th and 24th wards of the City of Milwaukee).

== Background ==
Baumann was born on February 15, 1902, in Milwaukee, and attended in public schools. He became an electrician and joined the International Brotherhood of Electrical Workers. In 1925, he served as the assistant business agent for his local union and as a delegate to the IBEW's international convention in Seattle, Washington. He held various positions within the Milwaukee labor movement and was serving as vice-president of IBEW Local 494 at the time of his election.

== In the Assembly ==
Baumann had never held public office prior to his successful 1926 bid for the Assembly to replace fellow Socialist Olaf C. Olsen. Due to his only opponent's failure to complete the necessary paperwork, Baumann ran unopposed in the 1926 election, becoming one of three Socialists to do so. He was assigned to the Assembly's Standing Committee on education.

In his 1928 re-election bid, Baumann was defeated by Republican Alex Chmurski, who received 3,358 votes compared to 3,056 for Democrat George Brier and 2,989 for Baumann.

== After the Assembly ==
Baumann served on the Milwaukee Board of School Directors for some time. He died in March 1935 while seeking re-election to that office. He was a strong advocate for higher pay for teachers and educational staff.
