= Clarence C. Krause =

American politician

Clarence C. Krause was a member of the Wisconsin State Assembly.

== Biography ==
Krause was born on September 9, 1898, in Milwaukee, Wisconsin. He graduated from South Division High School and the University of Wisconsin–Madison.

== Career ==
Krause was elected to the Assembly in 1924. He was a Republican.
