= Joseph Przybylski =

American politician

Joseph John Przybylski (June 9, 1897 – December 4, 1953) was an American politician and member of the Wisconsin State Assembly born in Milwaukee. He graduated from South Division High School before attending the University of Wisconsin Extension and Marquette University.

== Career ==
Przybylski was elected as a Republican to the Assembly in 1928, defeating incumbent George L. Tews. In 1932, he was defeated for re-election as a Democrat by John Ermenc.
