= John C. Brophy =

American politician (1901–1976)

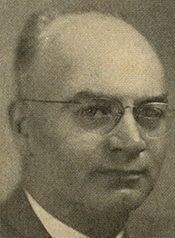

Member of the U.S. House of Representatives from Wisconsin's 4th district
- In office January 3, 1947 – January 3, 1949
- Preceded by: Thaddeus Wasielewski
- Succeeded by: Clement J. Zablocki

Personal details
- Born: October 8, 1901 Eagle, Wisconsin, U.S.
- Died: December 26, 1976 (aged 75) Milwaukee, Wisconsin, U.S.
- Cause of death: Cancer
- Resting place: Mount Olivet Cemetery, Milwaukee
- Party: Republican; Progressive (before 1946)
- Spouse: Marie Pechauer

Military service
- Allegiance: United States
- Branch/service: United States Navy
- Years of service: 1919–1921

John Charles Brophy (October 8, 1901 – December 26, 1976) was an American labor union organizer and Progressive and Republican politician from Milwaukee, Wisconsin. He was a member of the U.S. House of Representatives, representing Wisconsin's 4th congressional district during the 80th Congress (1947–1949). He also served as a member of the Milwaukee Common Council. Earlier in his career, he was active in the Coke and Gas Worker's union, and was president of the Milwaukee local.

== Early life and career ==
John C. Brophy was born in the town of Eagle, in Waukesha County, Wisconsin. As a child, he moved with his family to the nearby city of Milwaukee, Wisconsin, where he was raised and educated. He graduated from Milwaukee's St. Patrick's School and attended Marquette Academy for a year. Just before turning 18, he enlisted in the United States Navy, about a year after the armistice ending World War I. He served in the Navy from August 1919 to May 1921, and received an honorable discharge.

After his military service, he attended the Milwaukee Vocational School and worked as a mechanic for aircraft manufacturers and railroads. Through that work, he became involved in organized labor with the Coke and Gas Worker's union, and ultimately became president of the Milwaukee local. He was elected to the Milwaukee Common Council in 1939, and served until his election to Congress.

== Congress ==
Wisconsin's 4th congressional district 1932–1963

In 1942, Brophy made his first run for U.S. House of Representatives, running as the Wisconsin Progressive Party nominee in Wisconsin's 4th congressional district, which then comprised the southern half of Milwaukee County. His opponents in the race were the incumbent Democratic representative, Thaddeus Wasielewski, and Republican former U.S. representative John C. Schafer. Wasielewski prevailed with nearly 49% of the vote, Brophy came in a distant third with 18%.

In 1946, the Wisconsin Progressive Party voted to disband, with the majority of delegates voting to rejoin the Republican Party of Wisconsin. Brophy thus became a member of the Republican Party and that summer made another bid for election to the U.S. House of Representatives, this time seeking the Republican nomination. He faced a very crowded Republican field, with seven other Republicans in the race. Brophy prevailed with 24% of the vote. On the other side of the ticket, the Democratic incumbent, Thaddeus Wasielewski, lost his primary to union organizer Edmund V. Bobrowicz. After the primary, Bobrowicz was accused of communist ties, and Wasielewski decided to re-enter the race as an independent candidate. With Wasielewski taking 28.6% of the vote, Brophy won the general election with just 36.5% of the vote.

Brophy served in the 80th Congress, which was nicknamed the "Do-Nothing Congress" by U.S. President Harry Truman. Brophy lost his seat in the Democratic wave election of 1948, receiving just 39% of the vote against Democratic state senator Clement Zablocki, who won the seat with 56% of the vote.

Brophy made one more attempt to run for Congress in 1950, challenging Zablocki again. Brophy again faced a competitive primary, but managed to defeat his two Republican opponents. Brophy and Zablocki were the only candidates in this general election, and Zablocki won again in a landslide, taking 61% of the vote.

Although he served only one brief term in Congress, his congressional career had one lasting consequence: He nominated Juneau High School graduate Jim Lovell to attend the United States Naval Academy. Lovell went on to become an astronaut and famously commanded the Apollo 13 mission.

== Later years ==
Brophy never ran for elected office again, but remained active in politics. He was chosen to serve on the Republican electoral college slate for the 1952 United States presidential election. Since the Republican nominee, Dwight D. Eisenhower, won the state of Wisconsin, Brophy served as one of Wisconsin's 12 presidential electors that year.

In his later years, he worked in sales and public relations.

Brophy died of cancer in December 1976. He was buried in the Mount Olivet Cemetery in Milwaukee.

== Electoral history ==
=== U.S. House (1942) ===
Year	Election	Date	Elected				Defeated				Total	Plurality
1942	General	Nov. 3	Thaddeus Wasielewski (inc)	Democratic	46,819	48.79%	John C. Schafer	Rep.	29,104	30.33%	95,955	17,715
1942	General	Nov. 3	Thaddeus Wasielewski (inc)	Democratic	46,819	48.79%	John C. Brophy	Prog.	17,468	18.20%	95,955	17,715
1942	General	Nov. 3	Thaddeus Wasielewski (inc)	Democratic	46,819	48.79%	Robert Buech	Soc.	2,535	2.64%	95,955	17,715

=== U.S. House (1946, 1948, 1950) ===
Year	Election	Date	Elected				Defeated				Total	Plurality
1946	Primary	Aug. 13	John C. Brophy	Republican	9,707	24.11%	William E. Bohn	Rep.	8,716	21.64%	40,269	991
1946	Primary	Aug. 13	John C. Brophy	Republican	9,707	24.11%	Frank Schultz	Rep.	5,754	14.29%	40,269	991
1946	Primary	Aug. 13	John C. Brophy	Republican	9,707	24.11%	Chester Michalak	Rep.	4,143	10.29%	40,269	991
1946	Primary	Aug. 13	John C. Brophy	Republican	9,707	24.11%	Leon Nowak	Rep.	3,371	8.37%	40,269	991
1946	Primary	Aug. 13	John C. Brophy	Republican	9,707	24.11%	John Pringle	Rep.	3,233	8.03%	40,269	991
1946	Primary	Aug. 13	John C. Brophy	Republican	9,707	24.11%	Lillian Kohlmetz	Rep.	3,232	8.03%	40,269	991
1946	Primary	Aug. 13	John C. Brophy	Republican	9,707	24.11%	Harry Chelminiak	Rep.	2,113	5.25%	40,269	991
1946	General	Nov. 5	John C. Brophy	Republican	49,144	36.53%	Edmund V. Bobrowicz	Dem.	44,398	33.01%	134,514	4,746
1946	General	Nov. 5	John C. Brophy	Republican	49,144	36.53%	Thaddeus Wasielewski (inc)	Ind.D.	38,502	28.62%	134,514	4,746
1946	General	Nov. 5	John C. Brophy	Republican	49,144	36.53%	George E. Helberg	Soc.	2,470	1.84%	134,514	4,746
1948	Primary	Sep. 21	John C. Brophy (inc)	Republican	23,183	59.09%	Charles A. Madison	Rep.	9,050	23.07%	39,231	14,133
1948	Primary	Sep. 21	John C. Brophy (inc)	Republican	23,183	59.09%	Ruth Foster Froemming	Rep.	6,998	17.84%	39,231	14,133
1948	General	Nov. 2	Clement Zablocki	Democratic	89,391	55.89%	John C. Brophy (inc)	Rep.	63,161	39.49%	159,955	26,230
1948	General	Nov. 2	Clement Zablocki	Democratic	89,391	55.89%	Edmund V. Bobrowicz	Prog.	5,051	3.16%	159,955	26,230
1948	General	Nov. 2	Clement Zablocki	Democratic	89,391	55.89%	Clement Stachowiak	Soc.	2,326	1.45%	159,955	26,230
1950	Primary	Sep. 19	John C. Brophy	Republican	14,064	48.35%	Thomas Kattnig	Rep.	11,005	37.83%	29,087	3,059
1950	Primary	Sep. 19	John C. Brophy	Republican	14,064	48.35%	Paul A. Schmelter	Rep.	4,018	13.81%	29,087	3,059
1950	General	Nov. 7	Clement Zablocki (inc)	Democratic	83,564	60.87%	John C. Brophy	Rep.	53,702	39.12%	137,282	29,862

U.S. House of Representatives
Preceded by Thaddeus Wasielewski	Member of the U.S. House of Representatives from Wisconsin's 4th congressional district January 3, 1947 – January 3, 1949	Succeeded by Clement Zablocki
