= Ben Rubin (legislator) =

American politician from Wisconsin (1886–1942)

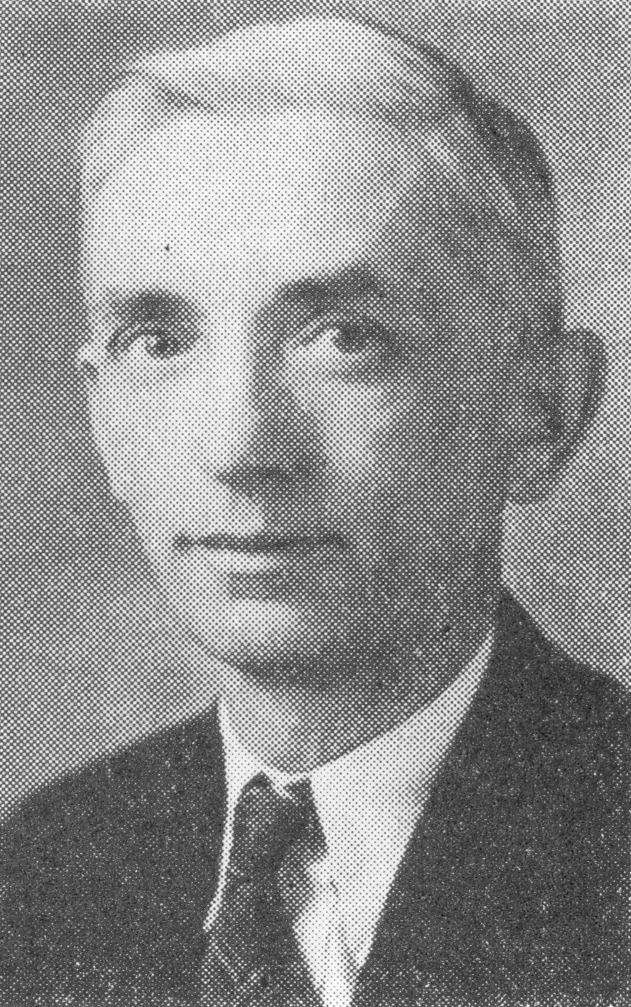
- Rubin c. 1940

Member of the Wisconsin State Assembly from the Milwaukee 6th district
- In office January 4, 1937 – February 24, 1942
- Preceded by: John N. Kaiser
- Succeeded by: Phillip Markey
- In office January 5, 1931 – January 2, 1933
- Preceded by: Frederick W. Cords Jr.
- Succeeded by: John N. Kaiser

Personal details
- Born: December 20, 1886 Pittsburgh, Pennsylvania, U.S.
- Died: February 24, 1942 (aged 55)
- Party: Socialist; Progressive

Ben Rubin (December 20, 1886 – February 24, 1942) was a cigar maker, zookeeper, union activist and member of the Wisconsin State Assembly from Milwaukee who served four terms. He was elected in 1930 and served one term as a Socialist. He was later elected as a Progressive on a fusion ticket, serving for six years (1937–1942).

Rubin's district had the largest concentration of African Americans in Wisconsin, and he was the author of a number of civil rights bills on topics such as insurance, employment by regulated utilities, and public accommodations.

== Background ==
Rubin was born December 20, 1886, in Pittsburgh, Pennsylvania. He attended public school to the age of ten, when he became an apprentice in a cigar factory. He worked as cigar maker up to 1919, and during these years was a member of and served offices in the Cigar Makers' Union. In 1919, he went to work as a zookeeper in the Washington Park Zoological Garden. When first elected to the Assembly in 1930 he had been president of the Building Service Employees Union and secretary of the Central Board of Milwaukee municipal employees' unions, and had been (by his estimate) a member of the Socialist Party for about twenty years.

== Assembly service ==
In 1930 he was elected to the Assembly's Sixth Milwaukee County district (the Sixth Ward of the City of Milwaukee), with 1389 votes, unseating Republican incumbent Frederick W. Cords who drew 927 votes, with 350 for Democrat John N. Kaiser, and 55 for Lee Talton. He was assigned to the standing committee on labor.

In 1932 Rubin was a candidate for re-election, again facing Cords and Kaiser and two independents. This time Kaiser (with Franklin D. Roosevelt at the top of the Democratic ticket) was the victor, with 2240 votes to Rubin's 2130, Cord's 1412, and another 129 for the two independents.

In 1934, Rubin came within somewhere between nine and twenty-seven votes of unseating Kaiser. 104 paper ballots were lost before a recount was held, with a janitor later admitting he'd burned them as wastepaper. The final official count was 1289 for Kaiser (Democrat), 1262 for Rubin (Socialist), 1002 for Fred G. Miller (Progressive), 638 for Frederick G. Peterson (Republican), and 49 for an independent and "scattering".

In 1936 (at which time he was serving his fourth term on the executive board of the Milwaukee Federated Trades Council, Rubin again faced Kaiser in the general election, this time nominally as a Progressive (there were no official "Socialist" candidates during this era of Progressive/Socialist "federation" tickets, and no Socialist primary). Rubin unseated Kaiser with 3576 votes, to Kaiser's 2607 and Republican Paul Coleman's 1008. He returned to the committee on labor, and was also assigned to the committee on municipalities.

During this period he also served on the annuity and pension board of the Milwaukee County employees' retirement system.

He was re-elected as a Progressive/Socialist in 1938 and 1940 (winning four-way and three-way races); and died in office February 24, 1942. He was succeeded by Progressive Phillip Markey (federation no longer being in effect).
