= Case–Zablocki Act =

1972 American law

The Case–Zablocki Act of 1972 is an American law, still in effect, designed to ensure that Congress would be informed about the international commitments made by executive agreements. The law was named after Democratic Congressman Clement Zablocki of Wisconsin and Republican Senator Clifford P. Case of New Jersey. It was passed in reaction to the ongoing Vietnam war, in which Congress rarely had a say. It required all classified executive agreements to be transmitted to the House Foreign Affairs Committee, and to the Senate Foreign Relations Committee, within 60 days. In 1978, new Congressional resolutions strengthened the law, spelling out the reporting requirements in more detail, and including as well oral agreements.

The White House argued that the law was inconsistent with the president's constitutional right to direct foreign policy. Compliance has therefore been intermittent. From 1978 to 1992, 19 percent of agreements were reported after the 60 day deadline, and explanations were often incomplete. Disputes between Congress and the President have arisen when the former has become aware of certain controversial agreements, such as intelligence commitments and access to important bases, after the deadline.
