= Mount Olivet Cemetery (Milwaukee) =

Catholic cemetery in Milwaukee, Wisconsin

Coordinates: 42.9787°N 87.9612°W

- Interactive map of Mount Olivet Cemetery

Details
- Established: 1907
- Location: 3801 West Morgan Avenue, Milwaukee, Wisconsin
- Country: United States
- Size: 72 acres (29 ha)
- No. of interments: ~33,000
- Find a Grave: Mount Olivet Cemetery

Mt. Olivet Cemetery is a cemetery administered by the Roman Catholic Archdiocese of Milwaukee. It was established in 1907 on the south side of Milwaukee, Wisconsin. Located at 3801 West Morgan Avenue, the cemetery is one of seven cemeteries in the Archdiocese of Milwaukee Catholic Cemeteries (AOMCC) System. The 72-acre (290,000 m^{2}) property holds over 27,000 in-ground burials in traditional graves and above-ground entombments and inurnments in crypts and niches. In 2006, a mausoleum expansion project of over 2,000 new crypts and over 600 niches began.

== Notable interments ==
- John C. Brophy – politician
- James Groppi – civil rights activist
- Dan Lally – Major League Baseball player
- Don Marion – Major League Baseball player

== See also ==
- Calvary Cemetery, Milwaukee, Wisconsin
