= Casimir Kendziorski =

20th century Polish American politician

Member of the Wisconsin Senate from the 3rd district
- In office April 19, 1949 – September 26, 1974
- Preceded by: Clement J. Zablocki
- Succeeded by: Jerry Kleczka

Member of the Wisconsin State Assembly from the Milwaukee 5th district
- In office January 6, 1947 – April 19, 1949
- Preceded by: Mary O. Kryszak
- Succeeded by: George Sokolowski

Personal details
- Born: December 3, 1898 Province of Posen, Prussia, Germany
- Died: September 26, 1974 (aged 75) Milwaukee, Wisconsin, U.S.
- Cause of death: Pulmonary embolism
- Resting place: St. Adalberts Cemetery, Milwaukee
- Party: Democratic
- Spouse: Anastasia Kasprzak
- Children: at least 1

Casimir "Casey" Kendziorski (December 3, 1898 – September 26, 1974) was a Polish American immigrant, machinist, and Democratic politician from Milwaukee, Wisconsin. He was a member of the Wisconsin State Senate for 25 years, representing the south side of the city of Milwaukee from 1949 until his death in 1974. Earlier, he served two years in the Wisconsin State Assembly.

== Biography ==
Kendziorski was born in what is now western Poland. At the time of his birth, this was the Province of Posen in the Kingdom of Prussia, within the German Empire. He received a primary school education in his native Poland and attended evening school classes after moving to Milwaukee. From 1928 to 1930 he worked as a real estate broker, then worked as a machinist.

He was elected to the Wisconsin State Assembly in 1946, representing Milwaukee County's 5th district, and was reelected in 1948. The 1948 election also saw State Senator Clement J. Zablocki elected to the United States House of Representatives, leaving his 3rd Senate district seat vacant. Kenziorski ran in the April 1949 special election to fill the Senate vacancy and prevailed with 62% of the vote.

He was a member of the Polish National Alliance and a past vice-president of his local trade union. He was active in civic and labor activities.

Kendziorski served in the Senate until his death in September 1974. He maintained a near-perfect voting record in the Senate until February 1973, when he had to enter a nursing home due to poor health. He was taken from the nursing home to a Milwaukee hospital after suffering a pulmonary embolism that migrated from his leg into his lung. He died September 26, 1974.

== See also ==
- List of Polish Americans

Wisconsin State Assembly
Preceded by Mary O. Kryszak	Member of the Wisconsin State Assembly from the Milwaukee 5th district January 6, 1947 – April 19, 1949	Succeeded by George Sokolowski
Wisconsin Senate
Preceded by Clement J. Zablocki	Member of the Wisconsin Senate from the 3rd district April 19, 1949 – September 26, 1974	Succeeded by Jerry Kleczka
