= Robert P. Kordus =

American politician and businessman

Robert P. Kordus (August 1, 1939 – May 23, 2017) was an American politician and businessman.

== Biography ==
Kordus was born on August 1, 1939, in Milwaukee, Wisconsin. He graduated from Casimir Pulaski High School and went to Milwaukee Area Technical College. Kordus was an accountant and an office manager. Kordus had five children, Robert Jr., Peter, Karen, Jan, and Kris. He also had 9 grandchildren, Robert III, Rachel (Robert Jr), Katrina, Lauren, Natalie (Karen), Andrew, Kimberly, Zachary, and Emily (Jan).

== Career ==
Kordus served in the Wisconsin Assembly from 1965 to 1968. He then served on the Milwaukee Common Council from 1968 to 1976. Kordus was a Democrat. He worked for Wisconsin Electric. Kordus died on May 23, 2017.
