= South Division High School =

Location
- 1515 West Lapham Boulevard; Milwaukee, Wisconsin; United States; 43°0′50″N 87°55′50″W

Information
- Type: Public Secondary
- Established: 1890
- School district: Milwaukee Public Schools
- Principal: Jose Trejo
- Teaching staff: 67.81 (FTE)
- Grades: 9–12
- Enrollment: 842 (2023-2024)
- Student to teacher ratio: 12.42
- Colors: Cardinal red and white
- Athletics conference: Milwaukee City Conference
- Nickname: Cardinals
- Website: mps.school/south/

South Division High School is a public high school in Milwaukee, Wisconsin. South Division is part of the Milwaukee Public Schools.

== History ==
The building was built after an 1890 motion by the Milwaukee Board of School Directors, as a second Milwaukee high school for the South Side. Thus, South Division is the second-oldest high school in the MPS system (after the old East Division High School, now called Riverside University High).

=== Innovation in school lunches ===
At the start of the 1899 school year, Principal Arthur Burch was granted permission to open a school lunch room in the building. A basement room 27 by 60 feet was selected for the purpose; a kitchen 10 by 20 feet was partitioned off in one corner; furniture, dishes, etc. were purchased (for $316.65), and Emma Stiles of Chicago was placed in charge, to purchase provisions, plan each day's menu, and to see that all lunches were paid for. The menu was posted on a blackboard in the corridor, with each dish priced at five cents. This was something in the nature of an innovation and other cities made inquiries regarding the success of the scheme. The principal advantage, according to Burch's report to the Superintendent, was derived from serving warm lunches to the students, many of whom came from a distance too great to go home every day for a warm lunch, and who did better work in the afternoons than if they had eaten a cold one.

=== Demolition of old building ===
A new South Division High building opened September 7, 1977, one block from the old school. Almost nothing was brought over from the old building, but the crowning copper dome, "a South Side landmark since it was built in the 1890s" was preserved when the building was demolished in 1978. Efforts to bring it "back home" to be incorporated into the new building failed; and it now ornaments a local gardening supply business, where it also houses a collection of old South Division memorabilia.

== Demographics ==
The demographic breakdown of the 1,138 students enrolled for the 2012-2013 school year was:

- Male - 53.5%
- Female - 46.5%
- Native American/Alaskan - 1.2%
- Asian/Pacific islanders - 13.4%
- Black - 32.1%
- Hispanic - 46.9%
- White - 5.9%
- Multiracial - 0.5%

In addition, 86.1% of the students were eligible for free or reduced lunch.

== Athletics ==
The Cardinals compete in the Milwaukee City Conference. The school colors are cardinal red and white. South Division offers the following sports:

- Baseball (boys)
- Basketball (boys & girls)
- Football (boys)
- Golf (boys)
- Soccer (boys & girls)
- Softball (girls)
- Tennis (girls)
- Track (boys & girls)
- Volleyball (girls)
- Wrestling (boys)

South Division won state championships in boys' cross country in 1922, 1923 and 1931.

=== Athletic conference affiliation history ===
- Milwaukee City Conference (1893-1980)
- Milwaukee Area Conference (1980-1985)
- Big Nine Conference (1985-1993)
- Milwaukee City Conference (1993–present)

== Notable alumni ==
- Arthur Bremer, made an assassination attempt on presidential candidate George Wallace
- Darroll DeLaPorte, football player
- B. Z. Glass, Wisconsin State Representative
- Stone Hallquist, football player
- Ralph Hermann, composer and arranger
- Clarence C. Krause, Wisconsin State Representative
- Richard B. Nowakowski, Wisconsin State Representative
- Richard C. Nowakowski, Wisconsin State Representative
- Olaf C. Olsen, Marquette student elected to Wisconsin State Assembly at age 23 while still in law school
- Sam L. Orlich, Wisconsin State Representative
- Terry Porter, coach and player in National Basketball Association
- Joseph Przybylski, Wisconsin State Representative
- Charles J. Schmidt, Wisconsin State Representative and Senator
- Herbert H. Smith, Wisconsin State Senator
- Christian Steinmetz, athlete and lawyer in Basketball Hall of Fame
- Raymond J. Tobiasz, Wisconsin State Representative
- Fred Williams, football player
- John M. Young, Wisconsin State Representative
- Carl Zimmermann, television journalist, news anchor, and World War II correspondent
- Arthur L. Zimny, Wisconsin State Senator
