= Amos Thomas (Wisconsin politician) =

American politician

Amos Thomas (March 30, 1826 – ?) was an American farmer and politician.

Born in Daviess County, Indiana, Thomas moved to Wisconsin Territory in 1839 and settled in the town of Granville in the community of Good Hope. He was a farmer. Thomas served on the Milwaukee County, Wisconsin Board of Supervisors and was the chairman. In 1889, Thomas served in the Wisconsin State Assembly as a Republican.
