= Ben Z. Glass =

American politician

Member of the Wisconsin State Assembly from the 6th Milwaukee district
- In office 1925

Personal details
- Born: Benjamin Zion Glass; April 30, 1897 Kamianets-Podilskyi, Russian Empire
- Died: March 4, 1972 (aged 74) Albuquerque, New Mexico

Benjamin Zion Glass (April 30, 1897 – March 4, 1972) was an American attorney and politician who served as a member of the Wisconsin State Assembly.

== Biography ==
Glass was born into a Jewish family in Kamianets-Podilskyi, Russian Empire (present-day Ukraine). He came to the US with his parents in 1903. He graduated from South Division High School in Milwaukee, Wisconsin, in 1916 and from Marquette University in 1921. He earned his law degree from Marquette University Law School, and is thought to be the first Jew to graduate from Marquette with a law degree.

Glass was elected to the Assembly in 1924 as a member of the Republican Party.

He later moved to Chicago, then Dallas, and finally Albuquerque to practice law.

== Personal life ==
Glass married Charlotte Goldman in 1925.

He was active in B'Nai B'rith on both a local and national level.

He died in Albuquerque, aged 74, after a short illness.
