= Arthur L. Zimny =

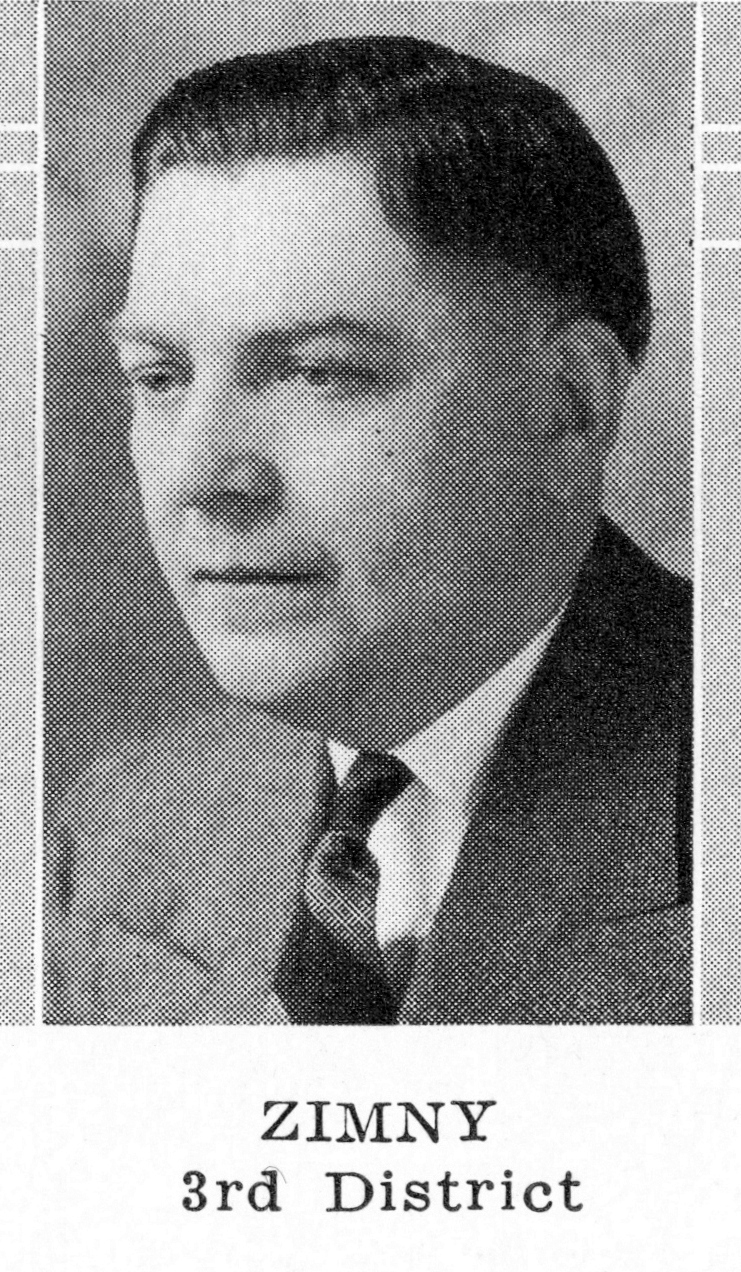
Arthur L. Zimny

Arthur L. Zimny (born 5 August 1900) was a member of the Wisconsin State Senate.

== Biography ==
Graduated from South Division High School in Milwaukee, Wisconsin. Zimny took part in the University of Wisconsin-Extension program. He was a member of the Polish Roman Catholic Union of America and the Knights of Columbus. He worked in the advertising business before entering the political sphere.

Zimny died in June 1973. Little is known about him.

== Career ==
Zimny was a Democratic member of the Senate, 3rd district, from 1935 to 1942.

== See also ==
- The Political Graveyard
