= Alex Chmurski =

American machinist and politician

Alexander J. Chmurski (April 19, 1899 – January 20, 1951) was an American machinist who served one term (1929-1930) as a Republican member of the Wisconsin State Assembly from the 11th Milwaukee County district (the City of Milwaukee's 11th and 24th wards).

== Background ==
Chmurski was born April 19, 1899, in Milwaukee. He attended parochial schools and Milwaukee Public Schools, later also attending the Marquette Conservatory of Music and the Milwaukee Art Institute. He worked in the printing trade, then as an office clerk. In 1915 he started working for International Harvester, and by 1918 had advanced to machinist in the factory.

== Legislative and electoral history ==
In 1928 he unseated incumbent Socialist Elmer Baumann in the general election, with 3,358 votes to 3,056 for Democrat George H. Brier and 2,989 for Baumann. He was assigned to the standing committees on engrossed bills and on state affairs.

Chmurski was himself unseated in the Republican primary election of 1930; his victorious opponent, John C. Bauer or Baur, in turn lost the general election to Socialist George L. Tews.

He sought nomination in the next two primaries in the 11th district, losing in the 1932 Republican primary. He ran in the 1934 primary of the Progressive Party (which in Wisconsin had split from the Republicans), and won nomination; but came in third in a five-way race, behind the Democrat and the Socialist, but ahead of the Republican nominee and an independent.

Chmurski died on 20 January 1951.
