= Stone Hallquist =

American football player (1902–1981)

Stone Conrad Hallquist (April 8, 1902 – June 1, 1981) was an American football running back, who played for the Milwaukee Badgers in the National Football League.

== Biography ==
Hallquist was born in Söderholm, Sweden. He went to South Division High School and Middlebury College. He played 9 regular season games over 1 season, in 1926.

He died in Sun City, Arizona.
