= Charles Schiewitz =

American politician

Charles Schiewitz was a member of the Wisconsin State Assembly.

== Biography ==
Schiewitz was born on March 4, 1885. He resided in Milwaukee, Wisconsin.

== Career ==
Schiewitz was elected to the Assembly in 1916. He was a Republican.
