= Jacob J. Litza Jr. =

American businessman and politician

Jacob J. Litza (August 29, 1880 – November 6, 1922) was an American businessman and politician.

Born in Milwaukee, Wisconsin, Litza served in Company "K" in the First Wisconsin Volunteers of the United States Army during the Spanish–American War. In 1910, Litza was appointed deputy sheriff for Milwaukee County, Wisconsin. He then became city agent for Miller Brewing Company and Jung Brewery Company. In 1913, Litza served in the Wisconsin State Assembly and was a Democrat. Litza then purchase a café and then became president of Berthelet Pipe and Supply Company. Litza died in a hospital in Milwaukee, Wisconsin.
