= Clement Stachowiak =

American politician

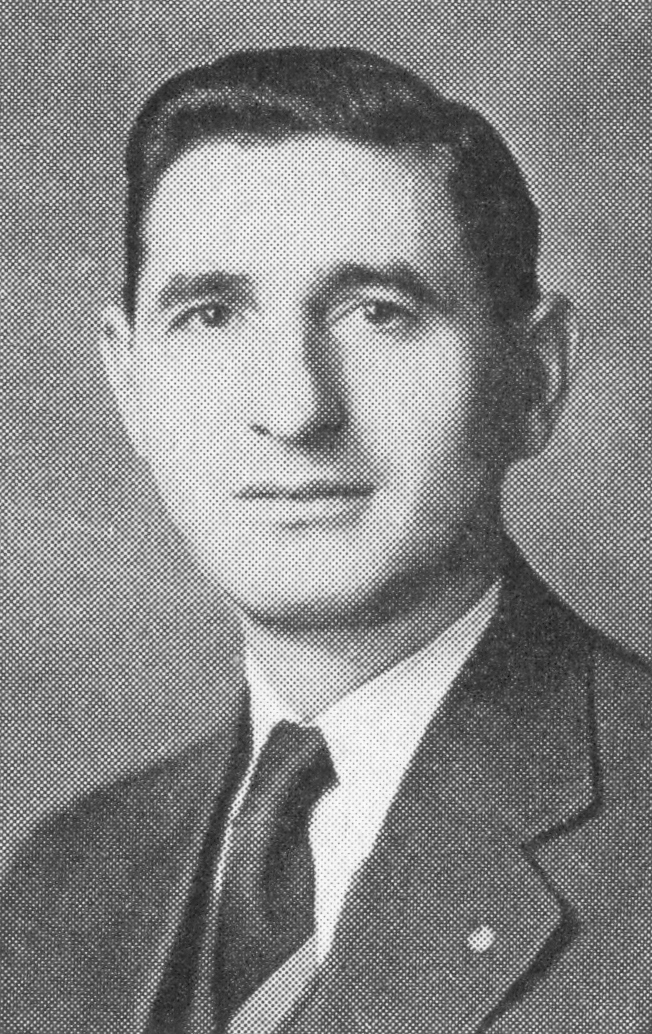
Stachowiak c. 1940

Clement Stachowiak (May 3, 1902 – December 12, 1981) was a member of the Wisconsin State Assembly from 1939 to 1941. He was elected to the Assembly on the Wisconsin Progressive Party ticket. In 1948, Stachowiak was an unsuccessful candidate for the United States House of Representatives from Wisconsin's 4th congressional district. Born in Milwaukee, Wisconsin, he was a member of the Socialist Party of America. Stachowiak was a laborer, police officer, and a machinist's helper.
