= Ward (United States) =

Optional division of a city or town

In the United States, a ward is an optional division of a city or town for administrative and representative purposes, especially for purposes of an election. Depending upon the state and local laws, the term ward can mean any of:

- an electoral district of a city council or town board, created for the purpose of providing more direct representation, from which one or more council members are elected; or
- a division used in political party leadership elections; or
- an administrative division, as in the wards of Newark, New Jersey or the six wards of Houston.

The ward system was the primary method used to elect city council members until the early 20th century when municipal reformers sought to replace it due to its control by political machines in major cities.

In Wisconsin, a 'ward' is what in most other states would be a precinct.

== See also ==
- Political machine in the history of the USA
- Ward (electoral subdivision)
