= 60th Wisconsin Legislature =

Wisconsin legislative term for 1931–1932

←	59th	61st	→
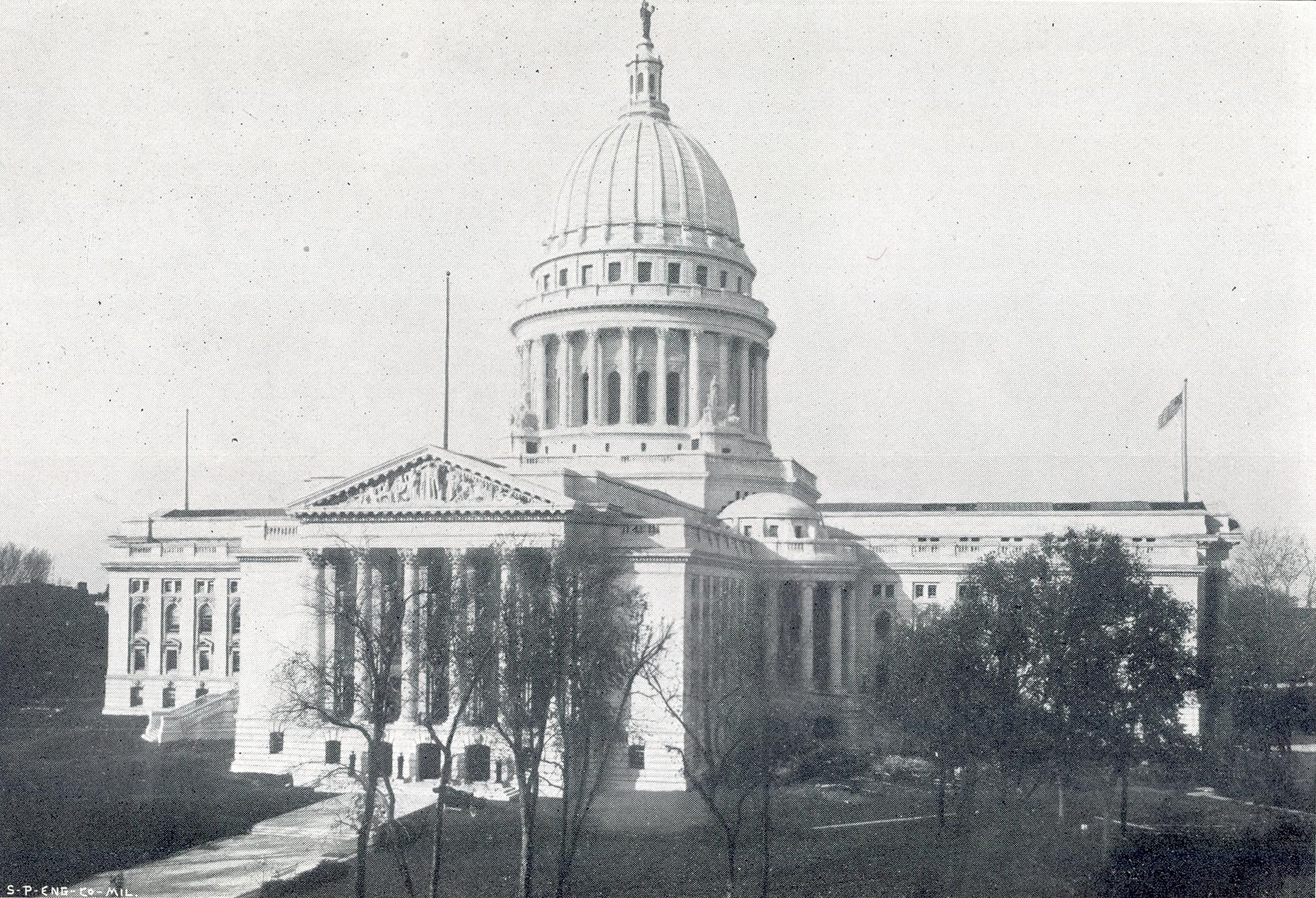
- Wisconsin State Capitol ca.1915

Overview
- Legislative body: Wisconsin Legislature
- Meeting place: Wisconsin State Capitol
- Term: January 5, 1931 – January 2, 1933
- Election: November 4, 1930

Senate
- Members: 33
- Senate President: Henry Huber (R)
- President pro tempore: Herman J. Severson (R)
- Party control: Republican

Assembly
- Members: 100
- Assembly Speaker: Charles B. Perry (R)
- Party control: Republican

Sessions
- Regular: January 14, 1931 – June 27, 1931

Special sessions
- Nov. 1931 Spec.: November 24, 1931 – February 5, 1932

The Sixtieth Wisconsin Legislature convened from January 14, 1931, to June 27, 1931, in regular session, and reconvened in a special session from November 24, 1931, to February 5, 1932.

Senators representing odd-numbered districts were newly elected for this session and were serving the first two years of a four-year term. Assembly members were elected to a two-year term. Assembly members and odd-numbered senators were elected in the general election of November 4, 1930. Senators representing even-numbered districts were serving the third and fourth year of a four-year term, having been elected in the general election of November 6, 1928.

The governor of Wisconsin during this entire term was Republican Philip La Follette, of Dane County, serving a two-year term, having won election in the 1930 Wisconsin gubernatorial election.

== Major events ==
- January 5, 1931: Inauguration of Philip La Follette as the 27th Governor of Wisconsin.
- March 1, 1931: Wisconsin congressman Henry Allen Cooper (WI-01) died in office.
- December 13, 1931: The Green Bay Packers were the champions of the 1931 NFL season.
- July 8, 1932: The Dow Jones Industrial Average reached its lowest level of the Great Depression.
- July 31, 1932: The July 1932 German federal election resulted in the Nazi Party becoming the largest party in the Reichstag.
- September 20, 1932: Wisconsin partisan primary election. In the ongoing intra-party feud in the Republican Party between Progressives and Stalwarts, the Stalwarts struck back in this primary:
  - Incumbent governor Philip La Follette was defeated by stalwart former governor Walter J. Kohler Sr.
  - Incumbent U.S. senator John J. Blaine was defeated by stalwart John B. Chapple.
- November 8, 1932: 1932 United States general election:
  - Franklin D. Roosevelt (D) elected President of the United States.
  - Albert G. Schmedeman (D) elected Governor of Wisconsin.
  - F. Ryan Duffy (D) elected United States senator from Wisconsin.
  - Wisconsin voters ratified four amendments to the state constitution:
    - to allow the Governor's salary to be set by legislation rather than fixed in the constitution
    - to allow the Lieutenant Governor's salary to be set by legislation rather than fixed in the constitution
    - to make technical corrections to the impeachment clause
    - to allow new options for municipal indebtedness

== Major legislation ==
=== Regular session ===
- 1931 Joint Resolution 52: Joint Resolution to amend Section 5 of Article V of the constitution, relating to the compensation of the governor, so as to in effect repeal the said section, and to submit this amendment to vote of the people at the general election of November 1932. Second legislative passage of a proposed amendment to the state constitution to allow the governor's salary to be set by legislation rather than fixed in the constitution. This amendment was ratified by voters at the November 1932 election.
- 1931 Joint Resolution 53: Joint Resolution to amend Section 9 of Article V of the constitution, relating to the compensation of the lieutenant governor, so as to in effect repeal this section, and to submit this amendment to vote of the people at the general election of November 1932. Second legislative passage of a proposed amendment to the state constitution to allow the lieutenant governor's salary to be set by legislation rather than fixed in the constitution. This amendment was ratified by voters at the November 1932 election.
- 1931 Joint Resolution 58: Joint Resolution to amend Section 1 of Article VII of the constitution, relating to impeachments, and to submit this amendment to vote of the people at the general election of November 1932. Second legislative passage of a proposed amendment to the state constitution to make technical fixes to the impeachment section. This amendment was ratified by voters at the November 1932 election.
- 1931 Joint Resolution 71: Joint Resolution to amend section 3 of article XI of the constitution, relating to indebtedness secured by public utility and other income producing property of municipalities, and to submit this amendment to vote of the people at the general election of November, 1932. Second legislative passage of a proposed amendment to the state constitution to allow new options and exceptions for municipalities taking on debt. This amendment was ratified by voters at the November 1932 election.
- 1931 Joint Resolution 86: Joint Resolution to amend section 1 of article IV and article XII of the constitution to give the people the power to propose laws and amendments to the constitution and to enact or reject the same at the polls, and to approve and reject at the polls any act of the legislature. First legislative passage of a proposed amendment to the state constitution to allow legislation to be proposed and enacted by public petition and referendum. This was the second time such an amendment was proposed, but this amendment also would not be enacted.
- 1931 Joint Resolution 86: Joint Resolution to amend section 1 of article III of the constitution, relating to suffrage, to eliminate obsolete provisions. First legislative passage of a proposed amendment to the state constitution to make technical updates to the suffrage section, removing references to "male" in qualifications for electors. Legally, women already had the right to vote in Wisconsin due to the federal constitution's 19th amendment. This amendment would eventually be ratified by voters at the November 1934 election.
- 1931 Joint Resolution 125: Joint Resolution memorializing The Congress to propose an amendment to the constitution of the United States repealing the Eighteenth Amendment. One of many Wisconsin resolutions objecting to the prohibition of alcohol and seeking to limit or repeal prohibition.

=== Special session ===
- January 19, 1932: An Act ... relating to the banking department, the banking review board, and the regulation of banks, providing penalties, and making appropriations, 1932 Special Session Act 10. Created the state Banking Review Board.
- January 29, 1932: An Act ... relating to unemployment reserves and compensation, providing penalties, and making appropriations, 1932 Special Session Act 20. Established Wisconsin's unemployment insurance program, the first such program in the United States and a model for the future Social Security Act.
- February 8, 1932: An Act ... relating to reapportionment of assembly and senatorial districts, 1931 Special Session Act 27.
- February 8, 1932: An Act ... relating to congressional districts, 1931 Special Session Act 28. Reduced the number of Wisconsin congressional districts from 11 to 10, the first time Wisconsin lost a representative in Congress during reapportionment.

== Party summary ==
=== Senate summary ===
Senate partisan composition Democratic: 1 seat Socialist: 2 seats Republican: 30 seats

	Party (Shading indicates majority caucus)			Total	
	Dem.	Soc.	Rep.	Total	Vacant
End of previous Legislature	0	2	31	33	0
Start of Reg. Session	1	2	30	33	0
From Nov. 1, 1931 (Note: Republican William Olson (17th District) died.)	1	2	29	32	1
Final voting share	9.38%		90.63%		
Beginning of the next Legislature	9	1	23	33	0

=== Assembly summary ===
Assembly partisan composition Democratic: 3 seats Socialist: 9 seats Republican: 88 seats

	Party (Shading indicates majority caucus)				Total	
	Dem.	Soc.	Ind.	Rep.	Total	Vacant
End of previous Legislature	5	3	1	90	99	1
Start of Reg. Session	3	9	0	88	100	0
From Feb. 26, 1931 (Note: Republican Hans A. Aune (St. Croix County) died.)	3	9	0	87	99	1
From Nov. 27, 1931 (Note: Republican William A. Kay (Pierce County) died.)	3	9	0	86	98	2
From July 13, 1932 (Note: Republican Joseph Schmittfranz (Clark County) died.)	3	9	0	85	97	3
From Sep. 11, 1932 (Note: Republican Henry Ellenbecker (Marathon County) died.)	3	9	0	84	96	4
Final voting share	12.5%			87.5%		
Beginning of the next Legislature	59	3	0	38	100	0

== Sessions ==
- Regular session: January 14, 1931 – June 27, 1931
- November 1931 special session: November 24, 1931 – February 5, 1932

== Leaders ==
=== Senate leadership ===
- President of the Senate: Henry Huber (R)
- President pro tempore: Herman J. Severson (R–Iola)

=== Assembly leadership ===
- Speaker of the Assembly: Charles B. Perry (R–Wauwatosa)

== Members ==
=== Members of the Senate ===
Members of the Senate for the Sixtieth Wisconsin Legislature:

Senate partisan representation Democratic: 1 seat Socialist: 2 seats Republican: 31 seats

Dist.	Counties	Senator	Residence	Party
01	Door, Kewaunee, & Manitowoc	John E. Cashman	Denmark	Rep.
02	Brown & Oconto	Elmer Hall	Green Bay	Rep.
03	Milwaukee (South City)	Walter Polakowski	Milwaukee	Soc.
04	Milwaukee (Northeast County & Northeast City)	Oscar Morris	Milwaukee	Rep.
05	Milwaukee (Northwest City)	Bernhard Gettelman	Milwaukee	Rep.
06	Milwaukee (North-Central City)	Thomas M. Duncan	Milwaukee	Soc.
07	Milwaukee (Southeast County & Southeast City)	Leonard Fons	Milwaukee	Rep.
08	Milwaukee (Western County)	Harry Daggett	Milwaukee	Rep.
09	Milwaukee (City Downtown)	Irving P. Mehigan	Milwaukee	Rep.
10	Buffalo, Pepin, Pierce, & St. Croix	Walter H. Hunt	River Falls	Rep.
11	Bayfield, Burnett, Douglas, & Washburn	Philip E. Nelson	Maple	Rep.
12	Ashland, Iron, Price, Rusk, Sawyer, & Vilas	James H. Carroll	Glidden	Rep.
13	Dodge & Washington	Eugene A. Clifford	Juneau	Dem.
14	Outagamie & Shawano	Anton M. Miller	Kaukauna	Rep.
15	Rock	George W. Blanchard	Edgerton	Rep.
16	Crawford, Grant, & Vernon	Edward J. Roethe	Fennimore	Rep.
17	Green, Iowa, & Lafayette	William Olson	Monroe	Rep.
18	Fond du Lac, Green Lake & Waushara	L. J. Fellenz	Fond du Lac	Rep.
19	Calumet & Winnebago	Merritt F. White	Winneconne	Rep.
20	Ozaukee & Sheboygan	Herman E. Boldt	Sheboygan Falls	Rep.
21	Racine	Walter S. Goodland	Racine	Rep.
22	Kenosha & Walworth	Conrad Shearer	Kenosha	Rep.
23	Portage & Waupaca	Herman J. Severson	Iola	Prog.Rep.
24	Clark, Taylor, & Wood	Walter J. Rush	Neillsville	Rep.
25	Lincoln & Marathon	Otto Mueller	Wausau	Rep.
26	Dane	Glenn D. Roberts	Madison	Rep.
27	Columbia, Richland, & Sauk	Fred W. Zantow	Baraboo	Rep.
28	Chippewa & Eau Claire	Peter J. Smith	Eau Claire	Rep.
29	Barron, Dunn, & Polk	John A. Anderson	Barron	Rep.
30	Florence, Forest, Langlade, Marinette, & Oneida	James A. Barker	Antigo	Rep.
31	Adams, Juneau, Monroe, & Marquette	Orland S. Loomis	Mauston	Rep.
32	Jackson, La Crosse, & Trempealeau	V. S. Keppel	Holmen	Rep.
33	Jefferson & Waukesha	William H. Edwards	Sussex	Rep.

=== Members of the Assembly ===
Members of the Assembly for the Sixtieth Wisconsin Legislature:

Assembly partisan composition Democratic: 3 seats Socialist: 9 seats Republican: 88 seats

Milwaukee County districts

Senate Dist.	County	Dist.	Representative	Party	Residence
31	Adams & Marquette		K. J. Callahan	Rep.	Montello
12	Ashland		Bernard J. Gehrmann	Rep.	Mellen
29	Barron		Charles A. Beggs	Rep.	Rice Lake
11	Bayfield		Robert A. Nixon	Rep.	Washburn
02	Brown	1	Harold C. Malchow	Rep.	Green Bay
02	Brown	2	Gustav J. Zittlow	Rep.	West De Pere
10	Buffalo & Pepin		Arthur A. Hitt	Rep.	Alma
11	Burnett & Washburn		James H. Jensen	Rep.	Grantsburg
19	Calumet		Jerome F. Fox	Dem.	Chilton
28	Chippewa		Ingolf E. Rasmus	Rep.	Chippewa Falls
24	Clark		Joseph Schmittfranz	Rep.	Thorp
27	Columbia		E. Myrwyn Rowlands	Rep.	Cambria
16	Crawford		W. R. Graves	Rep.	Prairie du Chien
26	Dane	1	Harold Groves	Rep.	Madison
26	Dane	2	James C. Hanson	Rep.	Deerfield
26	Dane	3	Albert J. Baker	Rep.	Mount Horeb
13	Dodge	1	Frank E. Panzer	Rep.	Oakfield
13	Dodge	2	Ira E. Burtis	Rep.	Beaver Dam
01	Door		Moulton Goff	Rep.	Sturgeon Bay
11	Douglas	1	Agnes Charbonneau	Rep.	Superior
11	Douglas	2	Joseph Westlund	Rep.	Superior
29	Dunn		James D. Millar	Rep.	Menomonie
28	Eau Claire		G. Erle Ingram	Rep.	Eau Claire
30	Florence, Forest, & Oneida		S. J. Gwidt	Rep.	Rhinelander
18	Fond du Lac	1	Carlton W. Mauthe	Rep.	Fond du Lac
18	Fond du Lac	2	H. Albert Wrucke	Rep.	Campbellsport
16	Grant	1	Harry E. Stephens	Rep.	Platteville
16	Grant	2	Hugh A. Harper	Rep.	Lancaster
17	Green		Ernst J. Hoesly	Prog.Rep.	New Glarus
18	Green Lake & Waushara		George M. O'Connor	Rep.	Hancock
17	Iowa		John S. Jackson	Rep.	Mineral Point
12	Iron & Vilas		John Benson	Rep.	Land o' Lakes
32	Jackson		William F. Dettinger	Rep.	Hixton
33	Jefferson		Don V. Smith	Rep.	Lake Mills
31	Juneau		Ben Tremain	Rep.	Hustler
22	Kenosha	1	Lewis W. Powell	Rep.	Kenosha
22	Kenosha	2	August J. Piper	Rep.	Somers
01	Kewaunee		Jacob J. Blahnik	Dem.	Algoma
32	La Crosse	1	John Mulder	Rep.	La Crosse
32	La Crosse	2	William F. Miller	Rep.	West Salem
17	Lafayette		S. Dell Penniston	Rep.	Argyle
30	Langlade		John R. Fronek	Prog.Rep.	Antigo
25	Lincoln		Leo Gesicki	Rep.	Merrill
01	Manitowoc	1	John Lorfeld	Rep.	Cleveland
01	Manitowoc	2	David Sigman	Prog.Rep.	Two Rivers
25	Marathon	1	Ben Lang	Rep.	Marshfield
25	Marathon	2	Henry Ellenbecker	Rep.	Wausau
30	Marinette		Charles A. Budlong	Rep.	Marinette
09	Milwaukee	1	Cornelius T. Young	Dem.	Milwaukee
09	Milwaukee	2	Michael Laffey	Rep.	Milwaukee
04	Milwaukee	3	George Hampel	Soc.	Milwaukee
04	Milwaukee	4	Emil Meyer	Soc.	Milwaukee
07	Milwaukee	5	John Ermenc	Soc.	Milwaukee
06	Milwaukee	6	Ben Rubin	Soc.	Milwaukee
06	Milwaukee	7	Philip Wenz	Soc.	Milwaukee
03	Milwaukee	8	Ben Wiczynski	Rep.	Milwaukee
06	Milwaukee	9	Otto Kehrein	Soc.	Milwaukee
08	Milwaukee	10	John W. Eber	Rep.	Milwaukee
03	Milwaukee	11	George L. Tews	Soc.	Milwaukee
05	Milwaukee	12	Charles F. Westfahl	Rep.	Milwaukee
04	Milwaukee	13	Walter P. Kuptz	Rep.	Milwaukee
07	Milwaukee	14	Marshall Reckard	Soc.	Milwaukee
05	Milwaukee	15	Theodore Engel	Rep.	Milwaukee
08	Milwaukee	16	Charles B. Perry	Rep.	Wauwatosa
07	Milwaukee	17	John W. Grobschmidt	Rep.	South Milwaukee
04	Milwaukee	18	Milton T. Murray	Rep.	Whitefish Bay
08	Milwaukee	19	Allen Busby	Rep.	West Milwaukee
05	Milwaukee	20	Edward H. Kiefer	Soc.	Milwaukee
31	Monroe		Earl D. Hall	Rep.	Greenfield
02	Oconto		Carl Schoenebeck	Rep.	Lena
14	Outagamie	1	Oscar J. Schmiege	Rep.	Appleton
14	Outagamie	2	William Bay	Prog.Rep.	Kaukauna
20	Ozaukee		John L. Long	Rep.	Grafton
10	Pierce		William A. Kay	Rep.	Spring Valley
29	Polk		Marius Dueholm	Rep.	Luck
23	Portage		John Kostuck	Prog.Rep.	Stevens Point
12	Price		L. S. Shauger	Rep.	Ogema
21	Racine	1	John L. Sieb	Rep.	Racine
21	Racine	2	Edward F. Hilker	Rep.	Racine
21	Racine	3	John H. Kamper	Rep.	Raymond
27	Richland		A. Ray Lawton	Rep.	Viola
15	Rock	1	Stanley Slagg	Rep.	Edgerton
15	Rock	2	Erastus G. Smith	Rep.	Beloit
12	Rusk & Sawyer		Jorge W. Carow	Rep.	Ladysmith
27	Sauk		Robert J. Keller	Rep.	Sauk City
14	Shawano		Paul T. Fuhrman	Rep.	Bowler
20	Sheboygan	1	Curt W. Janke	Rep.	Sheboygan
20	Sheboygan	2	Frederick W. Krez	Rep.	Plymouth
10	St. Croix		Hans A. Aune	Rep.	Baldwin
24	Taylor		John Gamper	Rep.	Medford
32	Trempealeau		Frank A. Kellman	Rep.	Galesville
16	Vernon		Dedrick M. Langve	Rep.	Westby
22	Walworth		Daniel E. LaBar	Rep.	Delavan
13	Washington		Joseph J. Huber	Rep.	West Bend
33	Waukesha	1	Evan G. Davies	Rep.	Wales
33	Waukesha	2	William H. Steele	Rep.	Pewaukee
23	Waupaca		Daniel F. Burnham	Rep.	Waupaca
19	Winnebago	1	William Meyer	Rep.	Oshkosh
19	Winnebago	2	Nels Larson	Rep.	Neenah
24	Wood		Peter Ebbe	Rep.	Marshfield

== Committees ==
=== Senate committees ===
- Senate Standing Committee on Agriculture and Labor – V. S. Keppel, chair
- Senate Standing Committee on Committees – W. H. Hunt, chair
- Senate Standing Committee on Contingent Expenditures – P. J. Smith, chair
- Senate Standing Committee on Corporations and Taxation – H. J. Severson, chair
- Senate Standing Committee on Education and Public Welfare – W. H. Hunt, chair
- Senate Standing Committee on Highways – J. E. Cashman, chair
- Senate Standing Committee on the Judiciary – W. J. Rush, chair
- Senate Standing Committee on Legislative Procedure – H. J. Severson, chair
- Senate Standing Committee on State and Local Government – A. M. Miller, chair
- Senate Special Committee on Lobbying on Power Bills – W. S. Goodland, chair

=== Assembly committees ===
- Assembly Standing Committee on Agriculture – B. J. Gehrmann, chair
- Assembly Standing Committee on Commerce and Manufactures – W. A. Meyer, chair
- Assembly Standing Committee on Conservation – J. R. Fronek, chair
- Assembly Standing Committee on Contingent Expenditures – A. J. Baker, chair
- Assembly Standing Committee on Education – J. D. Millar, chair
- Assembly Standing Committee on Elections – J. Gamper, chair
- Assembly Standing Committee on Engrossed Bills – P. T. Fuhrman, chair
- Assembly Standing Committee on Enrolled Bills – J. Kostuck, chair
- Assembly Standing Committee on Excise and Fees – A. J. Piper, chair
- Assembly Standing Committee on Highways – H. Ellenbecker, chair
- Assembly Standing Committee on Insurance and Banking – E. M. Rowlands, chair
- Assembly Standing Committee on the Judiciary – R. A. Nixon, chair
- Assembly Standing Committee on Labor – C. W. Mauthe, chair
- Assembly Standing Committee on Municipalities – T. Engel, chair
- Assembly Standing Committee on Printing – D. F. Burnham, chair
- Assembly Standing Committee on Public Welfare – D. V. Smith, chair
- Assembly Standing Committee on Revision – G. J. Zittlow, chair
- Assembly Standing Committee on Rules – J. W. Carow, chair
- Assembly Standing Committee on State Affairs – J. H. Kamper, chair
- Assembly Standing Committee on Taxation – A. A. Hitt, chair
- Assembly Standing Committee on Third Reading – C. Schoenebeck, chair
- Assembly Standing Committee on Transportation – E. D. Hall, chair
- Assembly Special Committee on Highway Investigations – D. M. Langve, chair
- Assembly Special Committee on Forest Fires – C. A. Budlong, chair
- Assembly Special Committee on Conservation Commission Investigation – C. B. Perry, chair

=== Joint committees ===
- Joint Standing Committee on Finance – T. M. Duncan (Sen.) & C. A. Beggs (Asm.), co-chairs
- Joint Special Committee on Congressional Reapportionment
- Joint Special Committee on Investigation of Memorial Union
- Joint Special Committee on Manufacture of Farm Machinery in State Prison
- Joint Special Committee on Northern Wisconsin Problems
- Joint Special Committee on University and Capitol Heating Plants

== Employees ==
=== Senate employees ===
- Chief Clerk: R. A. Cobban
  - Assistant Chief Clerk: C. J. Knoche
- Sergeant-at-Arms: Emil A. Hartman
  - Assistant Sergeant-at-Arms: Norman J. Hippert
- Postmaster: Joseph Kernler

=== Assembly employees ===
- Chief Clerk: C. E. Shaffer
  - Journal Clerk: Charles E. Tuffley
- Sergeant-at-Arms: Gustave Rheingans
  - Assistant Sergeant-at-Arms: Edward J. Konkol
- Postmaster: William H. Kasiska
