= 1926 Wisconsin gubernatorial election =

- November 2, 1926
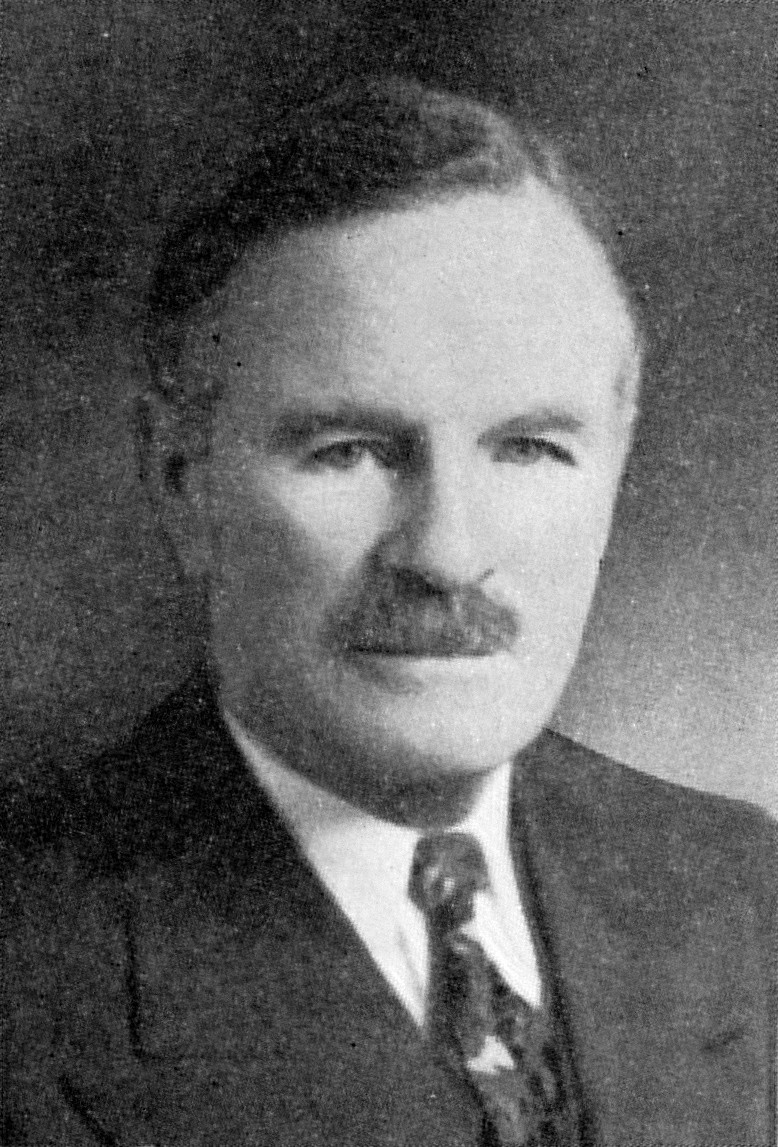

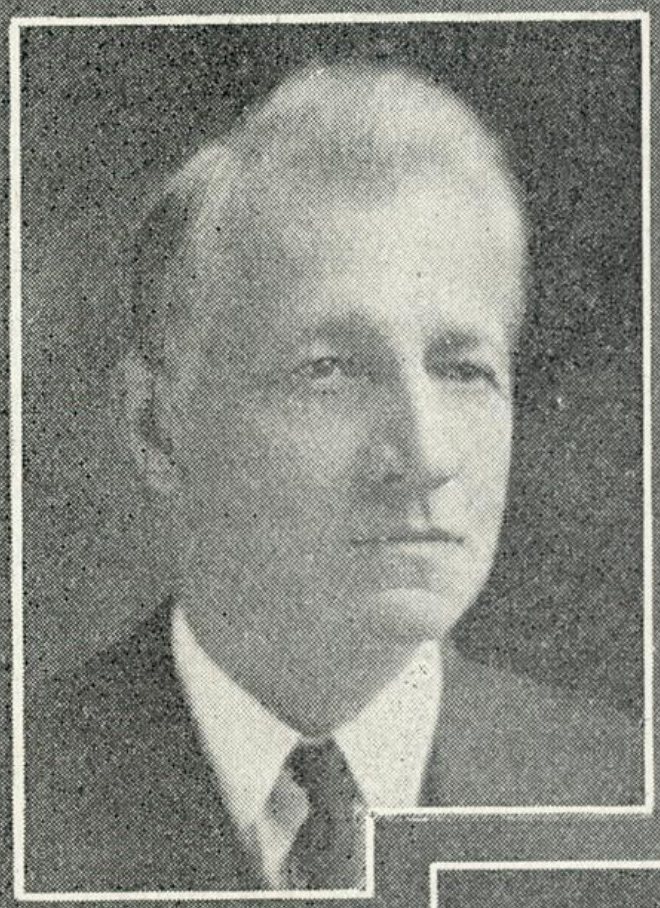

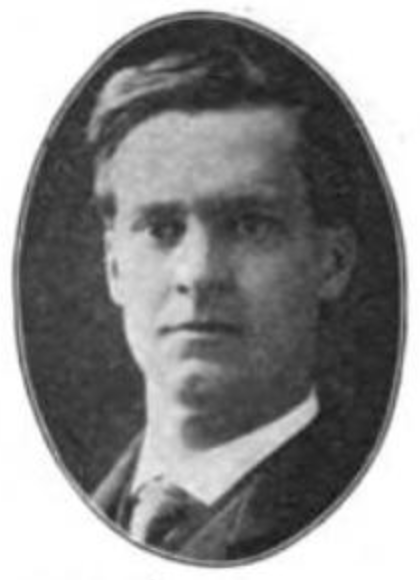

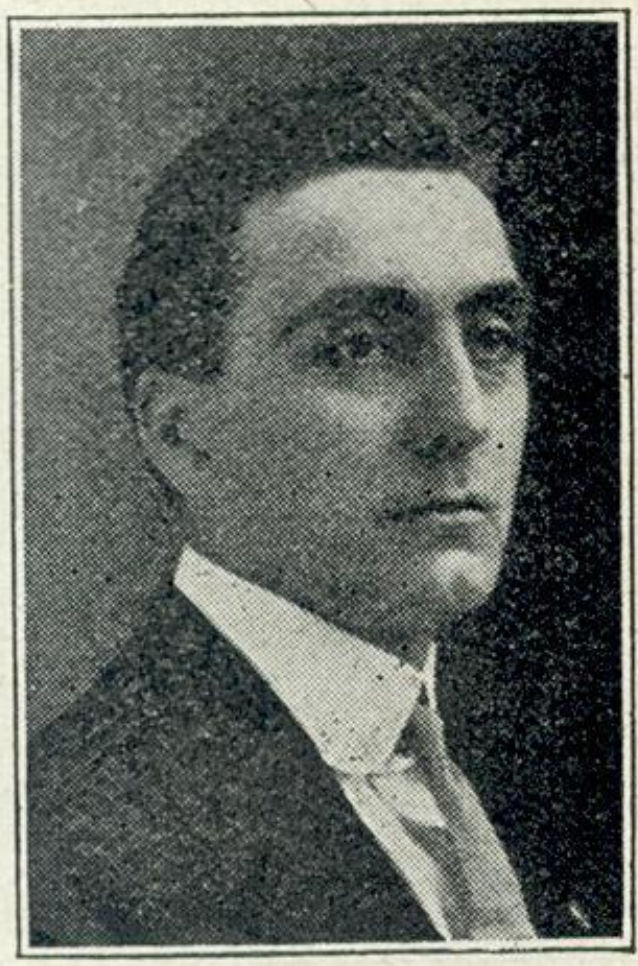
Nominee	Fred R. Zimmerman	Charles B. Perry
Party	Republican	Independent
Popular vote	350,927	76,507
Percentage	63.47%	13.84%
Nominee	Virgil H. Cady	Herman O. Kent
Party	Democratic	Social-Democratic
Popular vote	72,627	40,293
Percentage	13.14%	7.29%
- County results Zimmerman: 40–50% 50–60% 60–70% 70–80% 80–90% Cady: 40–50%
Governor before election
John J. Blaine
Republican
Elected Governor
Fred R. Zimmerman
Republican

The 1926 Wisconsin gubernatorial election was held on November 2, 1926. Primary elections were held on September 7, 1926.

Incumbent Republican Governor John J. Blaine retired to run for the U.S. Senate. Republican nominee Fred R. Zimmerman defeated Independent Charles B. Perry, Democratic nominee Virgil H. Cady and Social-Democratic nominee Herman O. Kent.

== Primary election ==
=== Republican party ===
==== Candidates ====
- Herman L. Ekern, incumbent Attorney General of Wisconsin
- Charles B. Perry, incumbent member of the Wisconsin State Assembly (ran as independent in general)
- W. Stanley Smith, former Commissioner of Insurance
- Fred R. Zimmerman, incumbent Secretary of State of Wisconsin

==== Results ====
Republican primary results
Party	Candidate	Votes	%
Republican	Fred R. Zimmerman	215,546	46.77%
Republican	Herman L. Ekern	178,252	38.68%
Republican	Charles B. Perry	41,856	9.08%
Republican	W. Stanley Smith	25,188	5.47%
Total votes		460,842	100.00%

=== Democratic party ===
==== Candidates ====
- Virgil H. Cady, Democratic nominee for Wisconsin's 7th congressional district in 1914

==== Results ====
Democratic primary results
Party	Candidate	Votes	%
Democratic	Virgil H. Cady	16,358	100.00%
Total votes		16,358	100.00%

=== Social-Democratic party ===
==== Candidates ====
- Herman O. Kent, former member of the Wisconsin State Assembly

==== Results ====
Social-Democratic primary results
Party	Candidate	Votes	%
Social-Democratic	Herman O. Kent	11,307	100.00%
Total votes		11,307	100.00%

=== Prohibition party ===
==== Candidates ====
- Adolph R. Bucknam, Prohibition nominee for U.S. Senate in 1922 and for Governor in 1924
- David W. Emerson, Prohibition nominee for Governor in 1914
- Alex McEathron, Prohibition nominee for Wisconsin's 9th congressional district in 1910

==== Results ====
Prohibition primary results
Party	Candidate	Votes	%
Prohibition	David W. Emerson	576	39.21%
Prohibition	Adolph R. Bucknam	546	37.17%
Prohibition	Alex McEathron	347	23.62%
Total votes		1,469	100.00%

=== Other party nominations ===
- Alex Gorden, Socialist Labor
- Charles B. Perry, Independent, incumbent member of the Wisconsin State Assembly

== General election ==
=== Results ===
1926 Wisconsin gubernatorial election
Party	Candidate	Votes	%	±%
Republican	Fred R. Zimmerman	350,927	63.47%	+11.71%
Independent	Charles B. Perry	76,507	13.84%	
Democratic	Virgil H. Cady	72,627	13.14%	−26.74%
Social-Democratic	Herman O. Kent	40,293	7.29%	+1.60%
Prohibition	David W. Emerson	7,333	1.33%	−0.12%
Socialist Labor (Note: "Independent Socialist Labor")	Alex Gorden	4,593	0.83%	+0.65%
	Scattering	632	0.11%	
Majority		274,420	49.63%	
Total votes		552,912	100.00%	
Republican hold		Swing	+37.74%	

=== Results by county ===
County	Fred R. Zimmerman Republican		Charles B. Perry Independent		Virgil H. Cady Democratic		Herman O. Kent Social-Democratic		All Others Various		Margin (Note: The margins are Zimmerman over Perry unless otherwise noted)		Total votes cast
County	#	%	#	%	#	%	#	%	#	%	#	%	Total votes cast
Adams	743	68.17%	98	8.99%	155	14.22%	54	4.95%	40	3.67%	588 (Note: Zimmerman's margin over Cady)	53.94%	1,090
Ashland	2,970	64.43%	907	19.67%	390	8.46%	160	3.47%	183	3.97%	2,063	44.75%	4,610
Barron	4,577	74.36%	704	11.44%	356	5.78%	261	4.24%	257	4.18%	3,873	62.92%	6,155
Bayfield	2,193	82.79%	167	6.30%	102	3.85%	83	3.13%	104	3.93%	2,026	76.48%	2,649
Brown	7,757	54.73%	1,267	8.94%	4,093	28.88%	780	5.50%	276	1.95%	3,664	25.85%	14,173
Buffalo	1,581	75.97%	182	8.75%	158	7.59%	97	4.66%	63	3.03%	1,399	67.23%	2,081
Burnett	1,591	85.31%	87	4.66%	52	2.79%	46	2.47%	89	4.77%	1,504	50.64%	1,865
Calumet	1,817	53.87%	263	7.80%	1,182	35.04%	59	1.75%	52	1.54%	635	18.83%	3,373
Chippewa	5,874	71.35%	1,309	15.90%	590	7.17%	117	1.42%	343	4.17%	4,565	55.45%	8,233
Clark	5,778	76.87%	884	11.76%	479	6.37%	153	2.04%	223	2.97%	4,894	65.11%	7,517
Columbia	5,075	70.55%	824	11.46%	1,006	13.99%	138	1.92%	150	2.09%	4,069	56.57%	7,193
Crawford	2,081	63.10%	283	8.58%	805	24.41%	45	1.36%	84	2.55%	1,276	38.69%	3,298
Dane	13,215	58.88%	5,029	22.41%	2,427	10.81%	1,029	4.58%	745	3.32%	8,186	36.47%	22,445
Dodge	6,420	55.53%	934	8.08%	3,588	31.03%	467	4.04%	153	1.32%	2,832	24.49%	11,562
Door	2,234	66.57%	861	25.66%	120	3.58%	33	0.98%	108	3.22%	1,373	40.91%	3,356
Douglas	8,852	83.92%	789	7.48%	385	3.65%	208	1.97%	314	2.98%	8,063	76.44%	10,548
Dunn	4,371	79.68%	643	11.72%	204	3.72%	127	2.31%	141	2.57%	3,728	67.95%	5,486
Eau Claire	5,355	68.11%	1,789	22.76%	391	4.97%	107	1.36%	220	2.80%	3,566	45.36%	7,862
Florence	1,004	89.01%	67	5.94%	23	2.04%	9	0.80%	25	2.22%	937	83.07%	1,128
Fond du Lac	8,270	66.22%	1,250	10.01%	2,558	20.48%	185	1.48%	226	1.81%	5,712	45.74%	12,489
Forest	1,571	74.88%	180	8.58%	275	13.11%	23	1.10%	49	2.34%	1,296	61.77%	2,098
Grant	6,469	69.55%	1,284	13.80%	1,208	12.99%	120	1.29%	220	2.37%	5,185	55.75%	9,301
Green	3,253	77.34%	475	11.29%	291	6.92%	70	1.66%	117	2.78%	2,778	66.05%	4,206
Green Lake	2,725	71.07%	477	12.44%	499	13.02%	27	0.70%	106	2.76%	2,226	58.06%	3,834
Iowa	3,178	62.68%	1,304	25.72%	359	7.08%	84	1.66%	145	2.86%	1,874	36.96%	5,070
Iron	1,724	82.77%	196	9.41%	57	2.74%	43	2.06%	63	3.02%	1,528	73.36%	2,083
Jackson	2,424	81.45%	270	9.07%	106	3.56%	84	2.82%	92	3.09%	2,154	72.38%	2,976
Jefferson	6,088	69.55%	913	10.43%	1,415	16.16%	139	1.59%	199	2.27%	4,673	53.38%	8,754
Juneau	3,168	76.54%	428	10.34%	396	9.57%	73	1.76%	74	1.79%	2,740	66.20%	4,139
Kenosha	9,212	65.84%	597	4.27%	3,567	25.49%	304	2.17%	312	2.23%	5,645	40.34%	13,992
Kewaunee	1,484	57.83%	478	18.63%	435	16.95%	112	4.36%	57	2.22%	1,006	39.20%	2,556
La Crosse	7,268	70.51%	1,092	10.59%	1,627	15.78%	96	0.93%	225	2.18%	5,641	54.72%	10,308
Lafayette	3,659	67.04%	493	9.03%	1,159	21.23%	67	1.23%	80	1.47%	2,500	45.80%	5,458
Langlade	3,504	60.68%	314	5.44%	1,685	29.18%	93	1.61%	179	3.10%	1,819	31.50%	5,775
Lincoln	2,666	59.88%	1,250	28.08%	306	6.87%	93	2.09%	137	3.08%	1,416	31.81%	4,452
Manitowoc	6,588	62.45%	1,420	13.46%	2,111	20.01%	245	2.32%	186	1.76%	4,477	42.44%	10,550
Marathon	9,437	74.17%	1,156	9.09%	798	6.27%	985	7.74%	348	2.73%	8,281	65.08%	12,724
Marinette	4,831	77.79%	640	10.31%	447	7.20%	96	1.55%	196	3.16%	4,191	67.49%	6,210
Marquette	1,413	68.79%	159	7.74%	432	21.03%	15	0.73%	35	1.70%	981	47.76%	2,054
Milwaukee	43,948	43.99%	15,411	15.43%	12,386	12.40%	27,250	27.28%	910	0.91%	16,698 (Note: Zimmerman's margin over Kent)	16.71%	99,905
Monroe	3,221	69.96%	706	15.33%	325	7.06%	141	3.06%	211	4.58%	2,515	54.63%	4,604
Oconto	3,379	60.23%	1,391	24.80%	698	12.44%	66	1.18%	76	1.35%	1,988	35.44%	5,610
Oneida	2,702	72.75%	400	10.77%	369	9.94%	134	3.61%	109	2.93%	2,302	61.98%	3,714
Outagamie	9,105	69.10%	2,049	15.55%	1,444	10.96%	234	1.78%	344	2.61%	7,056	53.55%	13,176
Ozaukee	1,484	39.97%	462	12.44%	1,608	43.31%	78	2.10%	81	2.18%	-124 (Note: Cady's margin over Zimmerman)	-3.34%	3,713
Pepin	1,024	63.92%	250	15.61%	214	13.36%	54	3.37%	60	3.75%	774	48.31%	1,602
Pierce	4,132	76.01%	569	10.47%	205	3.77%	359	6.60%	171	3.15%	3,563	65.54%	5,436
Polk	3,349	77.25%	437	10.08%	204	4.71%	124	2.86%	221	5.10%	2,912	67.17%	4,335
Portage	3,869	46.97%	497	6.03%	3,685	44.73%	57	0.69%	130	1.58%	184	2.23%	8,238
Price	3,012	76.72%	518	13.19%	194	4.94%	95	2.42%	107	2.73%	2,494	63.53%	3,926
Racine	12,958	70.63%	2,908	15.85%	1,473	8.03%	486	2.65%	521	2.84%	10,050	54.78%	18,346
Richland	3,634	74.51%	483	9.90%	549	11.26%	39	0.80%	172	3.53%	3,085	63.26%	4,877
Rock	10,697	80.67%	1,537	11.59%	641	4.83%	155	1.17%	230	1.73%	9,160	69.08%	13,260
Rusk	2,407	69.87%	658	19.10%	157	4.56%	84	2.44%	139	4.03%	1,749	50.77%	3,445
Sauk	4,117	61.26%	677	10.07%	1,553	23.11%	179	2.66%	195	2.90%	2,564	38.15%	6,721
Sawyer	1,177	78.26%	153	10.17%	85	5.65%	38	2.53%	51	3.39%	1,024	68.09%	1,504
Shawano	2,999	71.40%	406	9.67%	374	8.90%	318	7.57%	103	2.45%	2,593	61.74%	4,200
Sheboygan	5,141	42.55%	3,581	29.64%	1,902	15.74%	1,238	10.25%	220	1.82%	1,560	12.91%	12,082
St. Croix	3,958	65.71%	1,305	21.67%	372	6.18%	207	3.44%	181	3.01%	2,653	44.05%	6,023
Taylor	2,332	74.62%	396	12.67%	140	4.48%	190	6.08%	67	2.14%	1,936	61.95%	3,125
Trempealeau	3,961	73.95%	728	13.59%	432	8.07%	65	1.21%	170	3.17%	3,233	60.36%	5,356
Vernon	3,987	76.61%	618	11.88%	256	4.92%	161	3.09%	182	3.50%	3,369	64,74%	5,204
Vilas	907	83.90%	45	4.16%	61	5.64%	36	3.33%	32	2.96%	849	78.26%	1,081
Walworth	5,691	77.28%	714	9.70%	636	8.64%	78	1.06%	245	3.33%	4,977	67.59%	7,364
Washburn	1,572	79.59%	211	10.68%	57	2.89%	76	3.85%	59	2.99%	1,361	68.91%	1,975
Washington	2,721	52.41%	519	10.00%	1,735	33.42%	156	3.00%	61	1.17%	986	18.99%	5,192
Waukesha	6,277	63.83%	1,337	13.60%	1,730	17.59%	298	3.03%	192	1.95%	4,547	46.24%	9,834
Waupaca	5,637	78.35%	905	12.58%	398	5.53%	112	1.56%	143	1.99%	4,732	65.77%	7,195
Waushara	2,972	82.26%	351	9.71%	172	4.76%	41	1.13%	77	2.13%	2,621	72.54%	3,613
Winnebago	10,048	64.72%	3,112	20.05%	1,642	10.58%	459	2.96%	264	1.70%	6,936	44.68%	15,525
Wood	6,089	67.15%	1,710	18.86%	693	7.64%	358	3.95%	218	2.40%	4,379	48.29%	9,068
Total	350,927	63.47%	76,507	13.84%	72,627	13.14%	40,293	7.29%	12,558	2.27%	274,420	49.63%	552,912

==== Counties that flipped from Democratic to Republican ====
- Columbia
- Green Lake
- Jefferson
- Kenosha
- Marquette
- Pepin
- Portage
- Racine
- Richland
- Rock
- Walworth
- Washington
- Waukesha
- Winnebago

== Bibliography ==
- Gubernatorial Elections, 1787-1997. Washington, D.C.: Congressional Quarterly Inc. 1998. ISBN 1-56802-396-0.
- Holmes, Fred L., ed. (1927). The Wisconsin Blue Book, 1927. Madison, Wisconsin: Democrat Printing Company, State Printer.
