= Aune (surname) =

Aune is a Norwegian surname. Notable people with the surname include:

- Alison Aune, American professor and artist
- Anders John Aune (1923–2011), Norwegian politician
- Ashley Aune, American businesswoman and politician
- Austin Aune (born 1993), American gridiron football player
- Espen Aune (born 1982), Norwegian strongman
- David Aune (born 1939), American scholar
- Eira Aune (born 1997), Norwegian handball player
- Hans A. Aune (1878–1931), American educator, businessman, and politician
- Helge Aune (born 1973), retired Norwegian football defender
- Ingrid Aune (1985–2019), Norwegian politician
- Karin Aune (born 1975), Swedish road cyclist
- Leif Jørgen Aune (1925–2019), Norwegian economist and politician
- Malin Aune (born 1995), Norwegian handball player
- Nathan Aune (born 1996), American footballer
- Pål Trøan Aune (born 1992), Norwegian cross-country skier
- Therese Aune (born 1987), Norwegian musician and songwriter
- Tom Freddy Aune (born 1970), Norwegian footballer and coach
