= Emil Meyer =

Emil Meyer may refer to:

- Emil Meyer (linotype operator) (1862–?), linotype operator and Socialist legislator from Milwaukee, Wisconsin
- Emil Heinrich Meyer (1886–1945), German banker for the Third Reich

== See also ==
- Hannes Meyer (Hans Emil Meyer, 1889–1954), architect and Bauhaus theorist
- Torben Meyer (Torbin Emil Meyer, 1884–1975), Danish character actor
