= Julius Kiesner =

American politician

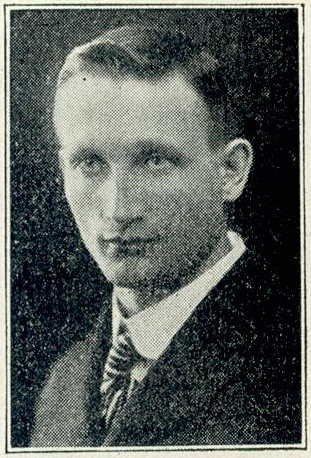
- Kiesner c. 1919

Member of the Wisconsin State Assembly from the Milwaukee 9th district
- In office January 6, 1919 – January 7, 1929
- Preceded by: Herman O. Kent
- Succeeded by: Otto Kehrein

Personal details
- Born: October 29, 1884 Chilton, Wisconsin, U.S.
- Party: Socialist
- Profession: Vulcanizer, politician

Julius Kiesner was an American tire vulcanizer from Milwaukee who served five terms (1919–1929) as a Socialist member of the Wisconsin State Assembly representing Milwaukee's 9th Assembly district (the 9th and 10th wards).

He was born in Chilton, Wisconsin on Oct. 29, 1884 and was educated in the public schools of that city. He traveled extensively in the United States and Europe. In 1910, after moving to Milwaukee he joined the Socialist party.

== In the Assembly ==
He had never held public office until his successful 1918 bid for the Assembly to replace fellow Socialist Herman O. Kent. In his last race, in 1926, he ran unopposed (one of three Socialists to run unopposed in the 1926 election). He was succeeded by fellow Socialist Otto Kehrein.

== After the Assembly ==
In 1935 he was nominated as a possible "progressive" candidate for the City of Milwaukee election commission.
