= Jacob Kehrein =

American politician

Jacob Kehrein (born December 5, 1846) was a Prussian-born American schoolteacher and a Democratic Party politician who served one term in the Wisconsin State Assembly.

== Early life and education ==
Kehrein was born in Kroetzenach, Kingdom of Prussia, on December 5, 1846; he immigrated with his family to the United States in 1848, and settled in Milwaukee in 1867. He received a common school education, and became a teacher.

== Elected office ==
After one term as a justice of the peace, and ten years as chairman of his ward, Kehrein was elected to the Assembly in 1902 for the 9th district of Milwaukee County (9th ward of the City of Milwaukee), succeeding fellow Democrat John C. Karel. Kehrein received 1,043 votes against 1,031 for Republican George Christianson, 939 for Social Democrat Edmund J. Berner, and 40 for independent Louis Ziener.

He was defeated for re-election in 1904 in a re-match with Social Democrat Berner, who garnered 1,348 votes to 1,168 votes for Republican Frank Mueller, 844 votes for Kehrein, and 28 votes for Independent Republican Elias Lehman. He was the Democratic nominee again in 1906, losing once more to Berner, with 539 votes to Berner's 1,147 and Republican A. H. Lambeck's 902.

He does not appear to have been any relation to Socialist Otto Kehrein, who would later represent the same district in the Assembly.
