= Virgil H. Cady =

American politician

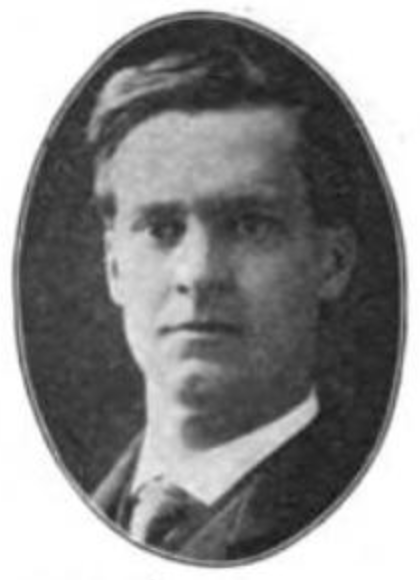

Member of the Wisconsin State Assembly
- In office 1908–1910
- Constituency: Sauk County First District

Personal details
- Born: December 25, 1876 Excelsior, Sauk County, Wisconsin
- Died: April 27, 1934 (aged 57) Baraboo, Wisconsin
- Party: Democratic
- Spouse: Margaret Pelley (m. 1903)
- Occupation: Lawyer, politician

Virgil H. Cady (December 25, 1876 – April 27, 1934) was a politician in the State of Wisconsin.

== Biography ==
Cady was born in Excelsior, Sauk County, Wisconsin on December 25, 1876 to William C. and Emogene Cady. He later moved to Baraboo, Wisconsin. On July 14, 1903, he married Margaret Pelley.

He died in Baraboo on April 27, 1934.

== Career ==
Cady served as a member of the Wisconsin State Assembly in 1909 before unsuccessfully running for a seat in the U.S. House of Representatives from Wisconsin's 7th congressional district in 1914, losing to incumbent John J. Esch, and for Governor of Wisconsin in 1926, losing to Fred R. Zimmerman. He was a Democrat.

Party political offices
Preceded by Martin L. Lueck	Democratic nominee for Governor of Wisconsin; 1926	Succeeded by Albert G. Schmedeman
