= Herman O. Kent =

American politician

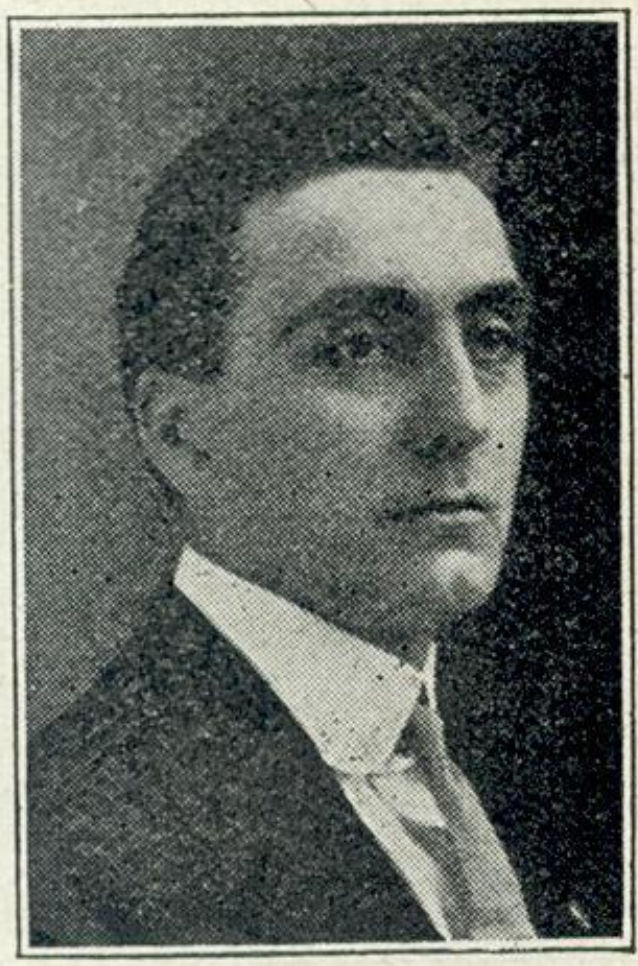
Herman O. Kent

Herman O. Kent (April 19, 1884 – ?) was a farmhand, typesetter and trade union activist from Milwaukee, Wisconsin who served two terms as a Socialist member of the Wisconsin State Assembly representing Milwaukee County's 9th Assembly district (the 9th and 10th wards of the City of Milwaukee).

== Background ==
Kent was born in Germany on April 19, 1884. He came to the town of Ashippun in Dodge County, Wisconsin with his parents, when one month old, living there on a farm until 1898, and attending local public schools and St. John's German-language parochial school. He then moved to Monterey in Waukesha County where he continued school and worked on a farm until 1901, when he entered his printing trade apprenticeship at the Wisconsin Free Press in Oconomowoc. After completing apprenticeship, he worked for several newspapers in Wisconsin. He went to Milwaukee in 1906, joining International Typographical Union Local 23 and continuing in his trade, eventually becoming a linotype operator for the Milwaukee Leader. He was active in the trade union movement and became a member of the Social Democratic party in 1908.

== Legislature ==
In 1912, Kent ran for the Assembly seat held by Socialist Edmund J. Berner, who was running for the state senate. Kent lost to Democrat William Walsh, who earned 1,209 votes against 1,035 for Kent, 459 for Republican Eugene Herman, and 31 for Prohibitionist Frank F. Wolfe. In 1914, with Walsh not running, Kent won the seat, with 915 votes to 674 for Democrat Anton Schloege and 548 for Republican Anthony Rausch, Jr. He was assigned to the standing committees on education and statutory revision.

Kent won re-election in 1916 with a vote of 1136, against 812 for Republican candidate A. F. Geisinger and 485 for prior opponent Rausch (now running as a Democrat). He transferred to the committee on labor.

He did not run for re-election in 1918, and was succeeded by fellow Socialist Julius Kiesner.

== Run for governor ==
In 1926, Kent was the Socialist nominee for Governor of Wisconsin. He came in fourth in a six-way race, with 40,293 votes (7.28%) out of 552,912.
