= William E. Walsh (Wisconsin tailor) =

American politician

William E. Walsh (December 25, 1869 – February 6, 1943) was a tailor from Milwaukee, Wisconsin who served one term as a Democratic member of the Wisconsin State Assembly.

== Background ==
Walsh was born in Galway, Ireland. His father died when Walsh was 11 years old, and he was sent to Boston, where he lived with relatives for a year before returning to Ireland. He and attended school until the age of fourteen, when he became a tailor. In 1887, at the age of 17, he sailed for Rio de Janeiro and remained in Brazil for about one year, when he took passage for New Orleans. After remaining there a short time he went to Puerto Limón, Costa Rica; then moved on to New York City, to Boston, Massachusetts and to St. Louis, Missouri, working at the tailoring trade in every place visited. In 1893 he moved to Milwaukee, where he married Marie Murray, and he worked for other tailors until 1898, when he enlisted in Company G, Fourth Wisconsin Volunteer infantry and served in the Spanish–American War. He was mustered out in February 1899, and became the manager of tailoring departments in various Milwaukee retail stores.

== Public office ==
He was elected to the Assembly for the 9th district of Milwaukee County (9th ward of the City of Milwaukee) in 1912 (Socialist incumbent Edmund J. Berner was running for the state senate), receiving 1,209 votes against 1,035 for Socialist Herman O. Kent, 459 for Republican Eugene Herman, and 31 for Prohibitionist Frank F. Wolfe. He was assigned to the standing committee on printing. He was later named deputy collector of internal revenue, in which capacity he was assaulted in April 1914 while inspecting a saloon.

He does not appear to have run for re-election in 1914. He was succeeded by Kent, who defeated Republican and Democratic candidates for the seat.
