= Mike Maslowski =

American football player (born 1974)

No. 51, 57
- Position: Linebacker

Personal information
- Born: July 11, 1974 (age 52); Thorp, Wisconsin, U.S.
- Listed height: 6 ft 2 in (1.88 m)
- Listed weight: 243 lb (110 kg)

Career information
- High school: Thorp
- College: Wisconsin–La Crosse
- NFL draft: 1997: undrafted

Career history
- San Diego Chargers (1997)*; San Jose SaberCats (1998); Kansas City Chiefs (1999–2004)
- * Offseason or practice squad member only

Career NFL statistics
- Tackles: 278
- Sacks: 4
- Interceptions: 3
- Stats at Pro Football Reference

Career AFL statistics
- Tackles: 14
- Passes defended: 2
- Forced fumbles: 1
- Stats at ArenaFan.com

Michael John Maslowski (born July 11, 1974) is an American former professional football player who was a linebacker in the National Football League (NFL) for the Kansas City Chiefs. He played college football for the Wisconsin–La Crosse Eagles.

== College career ==
The Wisconsin–La Crosse star earned Division III All-America honors as a senior. Maslowski finished his college career with 279 tackles, 21.0 tackles for a loss, 5.5 sacks, and 10 interceptions. He was part of the UW – La Crosse Eagles 1995 National Championship team as a junior when he had a career-high 108 tackles. Maslowski made 128 tackles and 13 interceptions to earn all-state honors as a senior at Thorp High School in Thorp, Wisconsin.

== Professional career ==
In 1997, Maslowski signed as a rookie free agent with the San Diego Chargers, but was cut by the team prior to the start of the regular season. In 1998, he played in the Arena Football League for the San Jose SaberCats. In 1999, Maslowski signed a contract with the Kansas City Chiefs of the NFL. The Chiefs then allocated him to NFL Europe where he played one season for the Barcelona Dragons of NFL Europe in 1999 where he set the single season record for tackles with 105 tackles, breaking the previous record of 95 tackles set by Anthony Fieldings of the Rhein Fire. Maslowski is the only player in the history of the NFL Europe to record a 100 tackle season. As a member of the Dragons, Maslowski was twice named the NFL Europe Defensive Player of the Week, was the Defensive Player of the Year, and helped lead his team to play in World Bowl VII against the Frankfurt Galaxy.

Maslowski joined the Chiefs in 1999, after the conclusion of the 1999 NFL Europe season, and played a significant role of the Chiefs special teams, earning the Chiefs' prestigious Mack Lee Hill Award, which is awarded to the most outstanding rookie of the team. His 2001 season was plagued by two major knee injuries, tearing his MCL and PCL in his left knee, but in the 2002 season he earned a spot at linebacker. In the 2002 season, Maslowski recorded 162 tackles, 109 of which were solo tackles, and broke the Chiefs single season record in tackles, which had previously been 157 tackles set by linebacker Gary Spani in 1979. This record was later broken by Derrick Johnson with 179 tackles. This record would be surpassed by Nick Bolton with 180 tackles in 2022

In 2003, Maslowski's season, and ultimately his career, were cut short by recurrent knee injuries which he first sustained in 2001. His MCL and PCL were completely torn from bone on his left leg and he underwent a tibial osteotomy which is designed to correct the alignment of the knee. He was only the second professional athlete to attempt a return to playing after undergoing such a surgery; the other was Steve Yzerman of the Detroit Red Wings. During training camp in the 2004 season, Maslowski attempted to make a comeback, but his left knee was not at full strength and the Chiefs placed him on the injured reserve. Again in 2005, he attempted a comeback, but decided to retire because he was not achieving his full potential.

On December 13, 2005, the Green Bay Packers worked out Maslowski, but did not sign him.

== Coaching career ==
Maslowski joined the Hamburg Sea Devils of NFL Europe in 2006 and was also the linebacker coach for the team.

== NFL career statistics ==
| Year | Team | G-S | No.Tkl. | Solo Tkl. | Sacks | TO Recovered |
|---|---|---|---|---|---|---|
| 1999 | Kansas City | 15–0 | 15 | 15 | 0 | 0 |
| 2000 | Kansas City | 16–5 | 64 | 46 | 2 | 1 |
| 2001 | Kansas City | 8–0 | 12 | 11 | 1 | 0 |
| 2002 | Kansas City | 16–16 | 123 | 92 | 1 | 4 |
| 2003 | Kansas City | 10–10 | 59 | 45 | 0 | 1 |
| Totals | | 65–31 | 273 | 209 | 4 | 6 |
