= Corwin C. Guell =

American politician

Corwin Carl Guell

Member of the Wisconsin State Assembly
- In office 1957–1958

Personal details
- Born: December 22, 1909 Fond du Lac, Wisconsin, U.S.
- Died: December 1976 (aged 66–67)
- Party: Republican
- Spouse: Anna L. Zimmerman
- Children: 3
- Education: North Central College; Northwestern University; University of Wisconsin Law School
- Occupation: Attorney

Military service
- Branch/service: United States Navy
- Years of service: World War II

Corwin Carl Guell (December 22, 1909 – December 1976) was a member of the Wisconsin State Assembly.

== Biography ==
Guell was born Corwin Carl Guell on December 22, 1909, in Fond du Lac, Wisconsin. He was later a resident of Thorp, Wisconsin, where he worked as an attorney. In 1932, he married Anna L. Zimmerman. They had three children. He attended North Central College, Northwestern University and the University of Wisconsin Law School. During World War II, he served as an officer in the United States Navy. He was also active in his local Methodist church, serving as a lay speaker.

== Political career ==
Guell was a member of the Assembly from 1957 to 1958. He also made an unsuccessful run for the Assembly in 1960. Guell was a Republican.
