= Thorp, Wisconsin =

- City
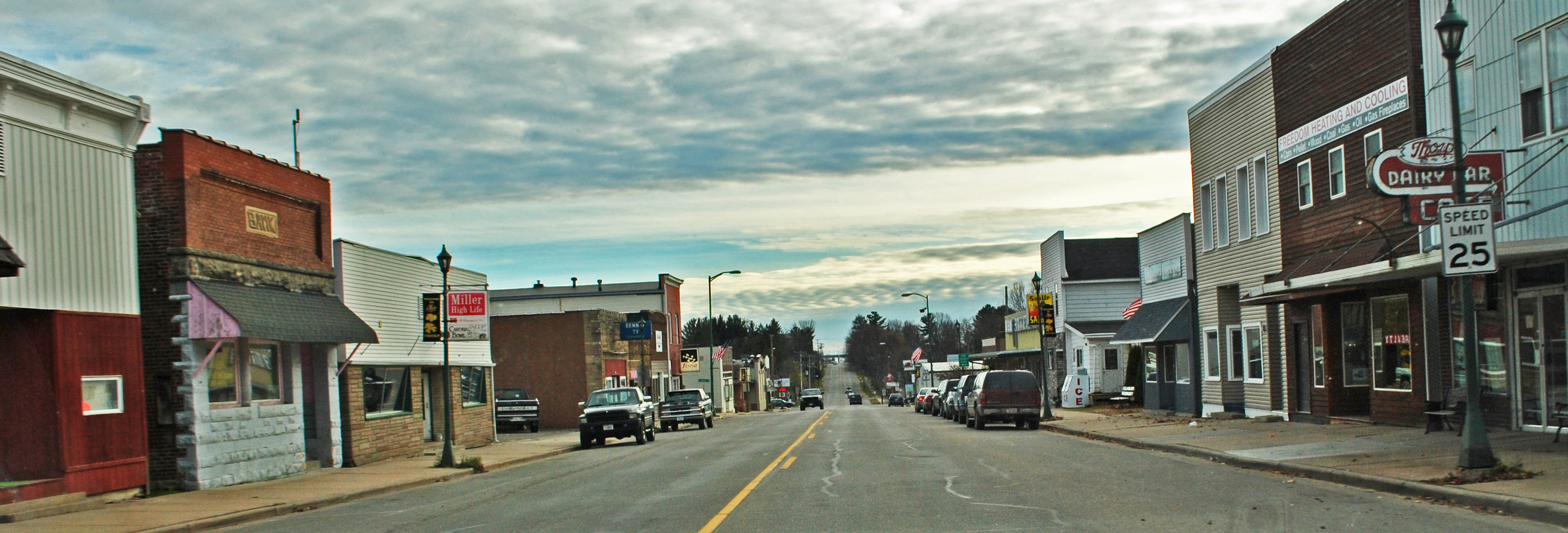
- Downtown Thorp

- Location of Thorp in Clark County, Wisconsin.

- Location within Wisconsin Location within the United States
- Coordinates: 44°57′35″N 90°48′4″W
- Country: United States
- State: Wisconsin
- County: Clark

Government
  - Mayor: Richard Wnek

Area
  - Total: 1.49 sq mi (3.87 km^{2})
  - Land: 1.49 sq mi (3.87 km^{2})
  - Water: 0 sq mi (0.00 km^{2})
- Elevation: 1,210 ft (370 m)

Population (2020)
  - Total: 1,795
  - Density: 1,200/sq mi (464/km^{2})
- Time zone: UTC-6 (Central (CST))
  - Summer (DST): UTC-5 (CDT)
- Area codes: 715 & 534
- FIPS code: 55-79625
- GNIS feature ID: 1575404
- Website: www.cityofthorp.com

Thorp is a city in Clark County, Wisconsin, United States. The population was 1,795 at the 2020 census. The city is located partially within the Town of Thorp and partially within the Town of Withee.

== Geography ==
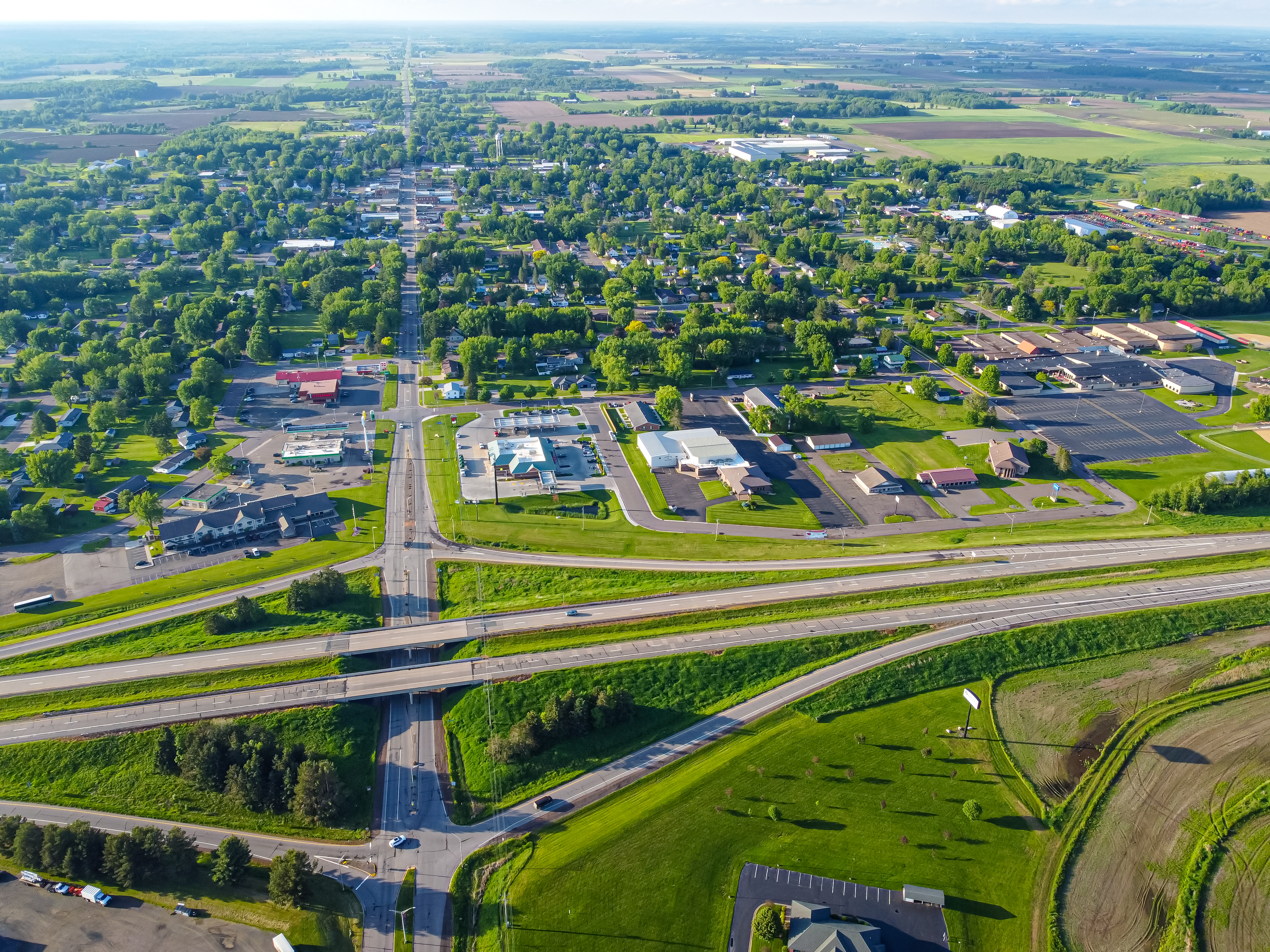
Wis-29 runs by town

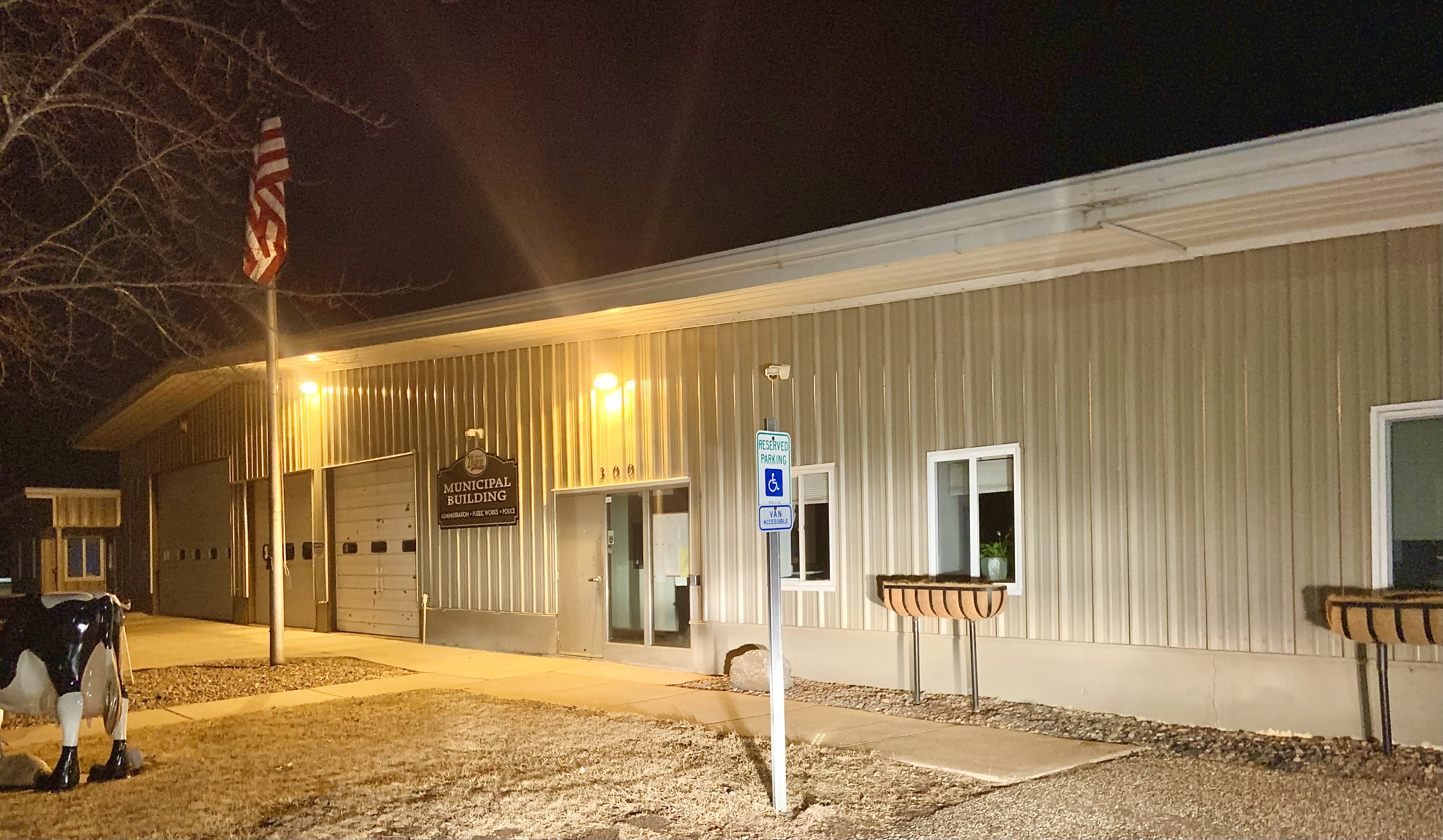
City hall

Thorp is located at 44°57′35″N 90°48′3″W (44.959792, -90.801061).

According to the United States Census Bureau, the city has a total area of 1.41 square miles (3.65 km^{2}), all land.

== History ==
The forest around Thorp was Ojibwe (Chippewa) territory in the decades before white settlers arrived. In the 1837 Treaty of St. Peters, the Ojibwe ceded Thorp and much of northern Wisconsin to the U.S. Around 1837 a sawmill and settlement began in Chippewa Falls to the west. In 1844 James O'Neill settled at Neillsville to the south. From 1847 to 1853 surveyors for the U.S. government marked off the section lines that would become Thorp and assessed timber and land quality.

The first settler near what would become Thorp was James Seneca Boardman, arriving in 1870 and building a log cabin for his family in what would become the Town of Withee. He made a little money by shaving shingles in the winter and hauling them by ox-sled 50 miles to Black River Falls, where he sold the shingles and returned with supplies. There were some Ojibwe families around, but that first year the Boardmans' nearest settler neighbors were ten miles away where Longwood is, and the nearest post office was in Greenwood.

Other settlers arrived soon. In 1871 D.R. Goodwin and George W. Richards settled in what is now the Town of Withee and Michael McCaffrey started a home within what are now the city limits of Thorp. They generally tried to clear land in the summer and made shingles or worked in logging camps in winter. James Boardman's brother Ephraim arrived with his family in late 1872, and in the next few years they were joined by George Courter, Nelson Courter, William Buyatt, S.S. Warner, Zeph Worden, William Jerard and F.M. Futts.

In 1874 the community built a log schoolhouse. The teacher was Mrs. Almeda Edmunds from Black River Falls, and she boarded with the J.S. Boardmans. Also in 1874 B.J. Brown established a post office named Winnieoka four miles east of what would become Thorp. He also stocked some goods which he sold to the locals. The following year, 1875, E.A. Boardman started selling some provisions hauled from Colby in what would become Thorp.

In 1876 the county board established the township of Thorp. E.A. Boardman was elected chairman. The 29 voters also agreed on some taxes: $1000 for improving roads, $300 for bridges, $25 for the school fund. They also agreed to split the children into two school districts. That year the school district built a frame schoolhouse.

Diphtheria broke out in 1879. The J.S. Boardman family lost four children, as did the C.C. Clark family. The Ephraim Boardmans lost two. When it finished, only one student was left in school district one.

In 1880 the Wisconsin Central Railroad reached Thorp from Abbotsford. The little community had been called North Fork, but the railroad named the station Thorpe, and soon shortened it to Thorp. The name honored Joseph G. Thorp, who founded the Eau Claire Lumber Company in 1866 and was a state senator in the 1860s and 1870s.

With the railroad came more growth. L.O. Garrison started a general store. E.A. Boardman opened a post office in his store. In 1881 the Boardmans platted a village of East Thorp, where the business section now is. The railroad had previously platted the west side of town. J.H. Sargent opened the Forest Queen Hotel. And Charles Sheldon and Melvin Nye started a sawmill. In addition to businesses already mentioned, the town also had a saloon, a blacksmith, and five homes.

The First Baptist Church formed in 1882, with the Methodist Episcopal soon after, and St. Bernard's Catholic parish soon after. The first newspaper, the Pioneer, began publishing in 1883, and soon was reorganized into the Courier. That same year the school district built a second building, with four rooms. About 1887 the York Iron Company built some kilns near town which converted local hardwood to charcoal that was then shipped by rail to fire the company's smelter at Black River Falls.

Polish immigrants began to arrive in the Thorp area in the late 1880s. By then much of the timber there was cut off, leaving this cutover land reduced to stumps and brush. This land was cheap, holding promise for hard-working new arrivals. The Poles concentrated east of Thorp and built their own wooden Catholic church in 1891, naming it St Hedwig's for Polish noblewoman Hedwig of Silesia. By 1904 their numbers had increased enough to replace the wooden church with the huge brick church that stands today. Many of these immigrants came from the area around Poznań, and they built a school called the Poznan School.

By 1894, major businesses in town were Nye, Lusk and Hudson's Saw Mill and Lumber Yard, the E.A. Boardman Saw Mill and Lumber Yard, and J.W. Cirkel & Sons Stave and Heading Works - a barrel-making factory.

The community of Thorp voted to incorporate as a village in 1893. The population was 837 by this time, and the reasons listed for incorporating included the need for a peace officer and jail to reduce the drunken brawls and disorderliness and bad language in the streets, the cattle and pigs running loose, the manure and filth in the streets, and the need for fire suppression. Addressing some of those concerns, the following year the new village installed a waterworks system with ten fire hydrants around town, and organized a hose company. An electric light plant was installed in 1901, a volunteer fire department in 1902, and a public sewer system in 1914.

The Thorp Telephone Company was organized as a private business in 1904, with fifty phones connected and Miss Allie Bruno manually making the first connections at a magneto switchboard in a building behind the Connor saloon.

Farming and dairying prospered on the cutover land as logging wound down in the early 1900s. Thorp Dairy Co. opened its first creamery in 1907 and by 1917 had five others operating in the area. The Big Four canning factory started in the 1920s and failed. Thorp Finance Co. started in 1924. The Women's Union Club built a library in 1926.

During the Great Depression in the 1930s the People's Exchange Bank closed, and many locals lost their savings. Farm values plummeted and some lost their farms. But some of the Polish immigrants never did trust banks, so didn't lose their savings. Expansion of Blue Moon Foods in 1939 helped raise wages and helped the village out of the depression.

In 1948 Thorp was incorporated into a city. The following year polio broke out, and various activities were cancelled to slow its spread.

Thorp's public swimming pool was built from 1955 to 1957, spurred by donations from Thorp Finance and guided by the Thorp Lions. The rural schools were consolidated around 1960, finally pushing the district to build a new high school in 1963.

== Demographics ==
Historical population
Census	Pop.	Note	%±
1890	723		—
1900	838		15.9%
1910	741		−11.6%
1920	796		7.4%
1930	892		12.1%
1940	1,052		17.9%
1950	1,383		31.5%
1960	1,496		8.2%
1970	1,469		−1.8%
1980	1,635		11.3%
1990	1,657		1.3%
2000	1,536		−7.3%
2010	1,621		5.5%
2020	1,795		10.7%
U.S. Decennial Census

=== 2010 census ===
As of the census of 2010, there were 1,621 people, 712 households, and 393 families living in the city. The population density was 1,149.6 inhabitants per square mile (443.9/km^{2}). There were 797 housing units at an average density of 565.2 per square mile (218.2/km^{2}). The racial makeup of the city was 98.9% White, 0.6% Native American, 0.1% from other races, and 0.5% from two or more races. Hispanic or Latino of any race were 0.9% of the population.

There were 712 households, of which 27.7% had children under the age of 18 living with them, 39.7% were married couples living together, 10.5% had a female householder with no husband present, 4.9% had a male householder with no wife present, and 44.8% were non-families. 39.6% of all households were made up of individuals, and 21.2% had someone living alone who was 65 years of age or older. The average household size was 2.19 and the average family size was 2.91.

The median age in the city was 41.5 years. 24.4% of residents were under the age of 18; 6.2% were between the ages of 18 and 24; 22.3% were from 25 to 44; 23.9% were from 45 to 64; and 23.2% were 65 years of age or older. The gender makeup of the city was 46.9% male and 53.1% female.

=== 2000 census ===
As of the census of 2000, there were 1,536 people, 706 households, and 391 families living in the city. The population density was 1,158.9 people per square mile (445.9/km^{2}). There were 759 housing units at an average density of 572.7 per square mile (220.3/km^{2}). The racial makeup of the city was 99.41% White, 0.07% Black or African American, 0.07% Native American, 0.13% Asian, 0.07% from other races, and 0.26% from two or more races. 0.59% of the population were Hispanic or Latino of any race.

There were 706 households, out of which 25.6% had children under the age of 18 living with them, 42.5% were married couples living together, 9.1% had a female householder with no husband present, and 44.5% were non-families. 39.9% of all households were made up of individuals, and 24.6% had someone living alone who was 65 years of age or older. The average household size was 2.10 and the average family size was 2.82.

In the city, the population was spread out, with 23.0% under the age of 18, 7.4% from 18 to 24, 23.5% from 25 to 44, 18.3% from 45 to 64, and 27.8% who were 65 years of age or older. The median age was 42 years. For every 100 females, there were 81.8 males. For every 100 females age 18 and over, there were 79.1 males.

The median income for a household in the city was $29,102, and the median income for a family was $39,000. Males had a median income of $30,602 versus $20,163 for females. The per capita income for the city was $15,828. About 6.7% of families and 11.0% of the population were below the poverty line, including 11.0% of those under age 18 and 19.2% of those age 65 or over.

== Education ==
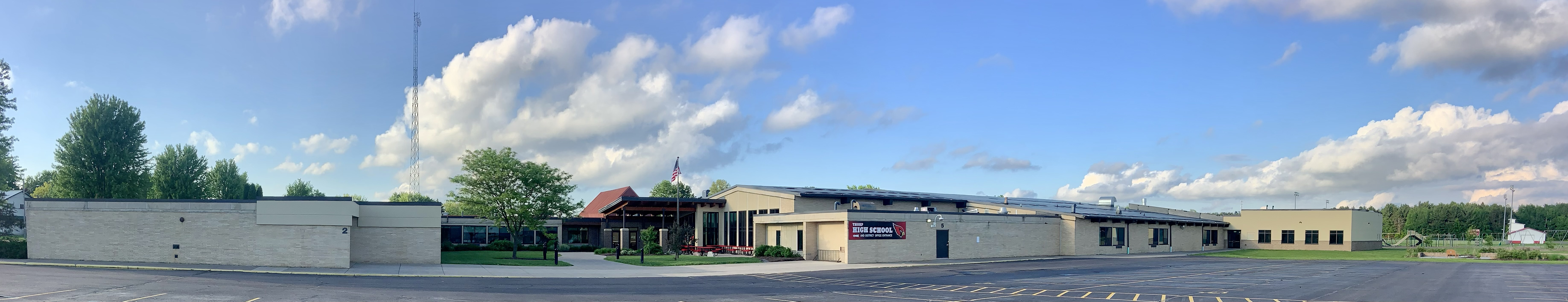
Thorp High School

Students living within Thorp, Wisconsin, attend schools within the School District of Thorp. There are two main schools in Thorp. They are the Thorp Catholic School and the Thorp Public School. The Catholic school has grades ranging from 1–8 grade and then they will go to the Thorp High School. The Thorp Public School contains PreK–6 elementary school, 7–8 junior high, and 9–12 high school.

== Notable people ==
- Filet of Soul – a rock band from the 1960s
- Corwin C. Guell – Wisconsin politician
- Jeff Hazuga (born 1978) – NFL player
- Stanley J. Lato – Wisconsin politician
- Mike Maslowski (born 1974)– former starting linebacker for the Kansas City Chiefs
- Billy Simons - singer and song writer
- Andy North (born 1950) – former professional golfer
- Eugene Oberle – Wisconsin farmer and politician
- Arnt O. Rhea – Wisconsin farmer, politician, and educator
- Joseph Schmittfranz – Wisconsin politician
- John Verkuilen – Wisconsin farmer and politician
- Robert K. Zukowski – Wisconsin politician
