= Edmund J. Berner =

American politician (1864–1917)

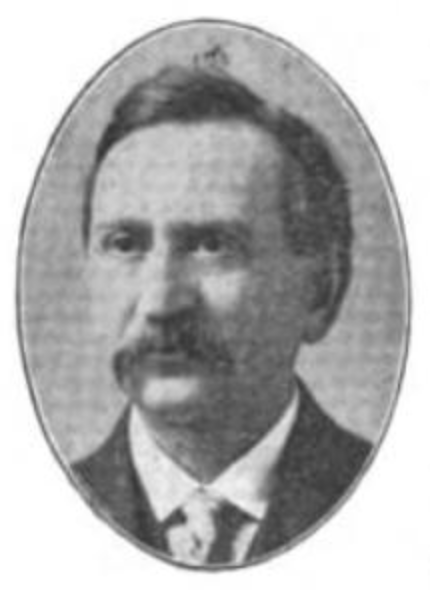
- Berner in 1909

Member of the Wisconsin State Assembly from the Milwaukee 9th district
- In office January 2, 1905 – January 6, 1913
- Preceded by: Jacob Kehrein
- Succeeded by: William E. Walsh

Personal details
- Born: May 17, 1864 Freistadt, Wisconsin
- Died: May 15, 1917 (aged 52) Milwaukee, Wisconsin
- Party: Socialist
- Occupation: Cigar maker, politician

Edmund J. Berner (May 17, 1864 – May 15, 1917) was a trade union activist from Milwaukee, Wisconsin who served four terms as a Socialist member of the Wisconsin State Assembly.

== Background ==
Berner was born in Freistadt, Wisconsin in Ozaukee County on May 17, 1864, and came to Milwaukee in 1872. A cigar maker by trade, he became active in the Cigar Makers' International Union and the trade union movement, and held various offices therein before being elected to the Assembly.

== Legislative races and service ==
In 1896, Berner ran for the Assembly for the 9th district of Milwaukee County (9th ward of the City of Milwaukee) as a Democrat/Populist, losing to Republican Reinhard Klabunde. In 1902, he ran as a Socialist, losing to Democrat Jacob Kehrein, who received 1,043 votes against 1,031 for Republican George Christianson, 939 for Berner, and 40 for independent Louis Ziener.

In 1904, Berner challenged incumbent Kehrein and won, with 1,348 votes to 1,168 votes for Republican Frank Mueller, 844 votes for Kehrein, and 28 votes for Independent Republican Elias Lehman. He was assigned to the standing committee on public health and sanitation. He was re-elected in 1906, defeating both Kehrein and Republican Arthur Lambeck; and was additionally assigned to the Assembly committee on libraries. In 1908 he again won out over Democratic and Republican opponents. He now listed himself as a "cigar dealer" by trade, and transferred to the Assembly committee on public improvements. He was re-elected again in 1910, for the first time polling more votes than his two major party opponents combined; and moved to the Assembly's committees on national and interstate relations, on cities, and on legislative procedure.

In 1912, he chose to run for the Wisconsin State Senate's 6th District seat, losing by a 97-vote margin to Democrat George Weissleder. He was succeeded in the Assembly by Democrat William E. Walsh.

He died in Milwaukee on May 15, 1917.
