= Ben Wiczynski =

American politician

Ben C. Wiczynski (January 1, 1895 – February 2, 1972) was an American politician, educator and businessman.

Born in Milwaukee, Wisconsin, Wiczynski went to South Division High School. He then went to Milwaukee Teachers State College and Marquette University. During World War I, he was a member of the Field Artillery Central Officers Training Band. He worked for the Gut-Wiczynski Realty Firm and helped start the Capitol Building and Loan Association. In 1931, he served in the Wisconsin State Assembly as a Republican. He retired from Milwaukee Public Schools after being a teacher and school principal.
