= G. Erle Ingram =

American politician

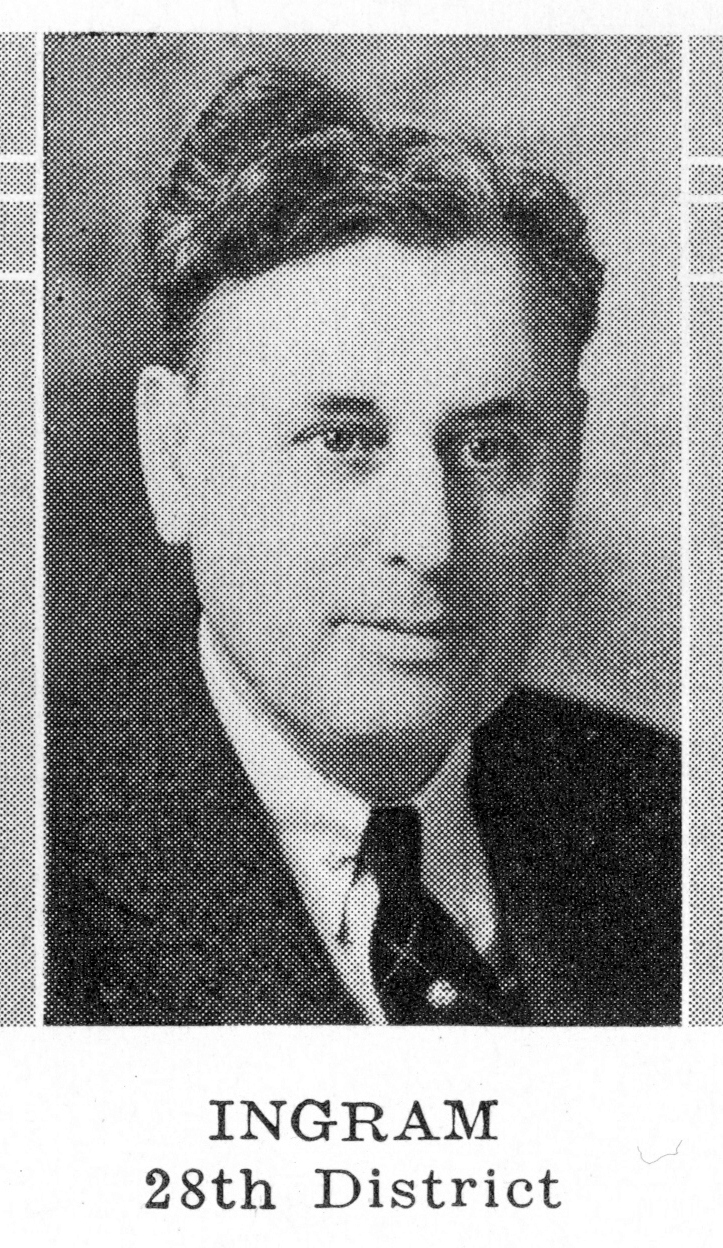
Gilbert Erle Ingram

G. Erle Ingram was a member of the Wisconsin State Assembly and the Wisconsin State Senate.

He was born Gilbert Erle Ingram on April 1, 1883 in Eau Galle, Dunn County, Wisconsin. He attended the Whitewater State Teachers College, the La Crosse State Teachers College, Kansas City Business College and Northern Indiana Law School.

== Career ==
From the age of seventeen, Ingram was a schoolteacher in various public schools in Wisconsin. In 1921, he began to practice law in Eau Claire. From 1928 to 1929, Ingram was a member of the Republican State Central Committee.

He served as a member of the Assembly from 1931 to 1932 and of the Senate from 1933 to 1940.
