= Otto Kehrein =

American politician (1873–1948)

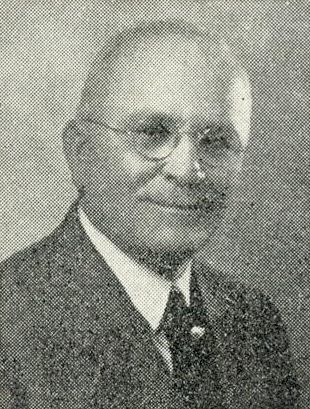
Kehrein's official State Assembly portrait, 1929

Otto A. Kehrein (October 22, 1873 – October 14, 1948) was an American carpenter from Milwaukee who served two terms (1929–1932) as a Socialist member of the Wisconsin State Assembly representing the 9th district of Milwaukee County (9th and 10th wards of the City of Milwaukee), and also served on the Milwaukee County Board of Supervisors.

== Background ==
He was born in the Town of Jackson in Washington County in 1873, grew up on a farm and was educated in the public schools of that area and at West Bend High School. Upon leaving school, he moved to Milwaukee, where he learned carpentry and practiced that profession, later going into the teamster, trucking and garage business.

== Public office ==
He had never held public office until his successful 1928 bid for the Assembly, succeeding fellow Socialist Julius Kiesner. (He does not appear to have been related to Democrat Jacob Kehrein, who had once represented the same district for one term from 1903–04.)

Kehrein was elected to the Milwaukee County Board in the spring of 1932, serving in both capacities until his Assembly term expired in January 1933. He was succeeded by Democrat George Weissleder, who had served in the Wisconsin State Senate 20 years before.

He was noted for composing his own verses and occasionally singing in the Assembly. In 1935 Kehrein testified before the Assembly in support of a bill to ban dance marathons.

In 1940 he ran as a Republican for the 2nd Milwaukee County Assembly district held by Andrew Biemiller (himself a former Socialist, but by then with the Progressives). Republican Governor Julius Heil quipped at a Republican convention that Kehrein was "a good singer, and he used to be a good Socialist." He lost by a considerable margin. He ran again in 1942 for the same seat, but was defeated in the Republican primary.
