= Emil Meyer (legislator) =

American politician

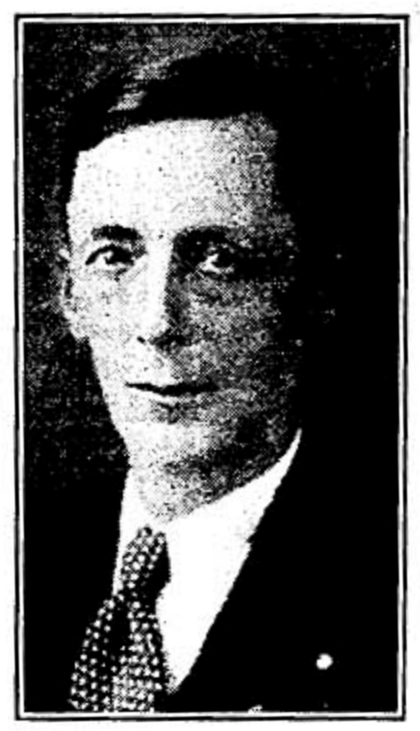
Emil Meyer, Socialist Wisconsin typesetter, labor activist and legislator

Emil Meyer (August 2, 1876 - ?) was a linotype operator from Milwaukee, Wisconsin who served one term as a Socialist member of the Wisconsin State Assembly.

== Background ==
Meyer was born in the City of Milwaukee on August 2, 1876, and attended the public schools of that city. After leaving high school, he learned the printing trade and worked on Milwaukee newspapers as a linotype machine operator. He became a member of the Milwaukee Typographical Union in 1900, and became active in his union, in the labor movement and in civic organizations.

== Legislature ==
He had never held public office before being elected to the Assembly in 1930 from the Fourth Milwaukee County Assembly District (the 21st Ward of the City of Milwaukee), with 1952 votes, to 1702 for incumbent Republican Assemblyman Fred W. Springer, 596 for Democrat Earle E. Wilson, and 283 for O. R. Werkmeister (who had lost the Republican primary election to Springer). Meyer was assigned to the standing committee on printing.

Meyer's Assembly district was merged into a new 13th Milwaukee County district, along with the 13th Ward. He sought re-election in 1932 anyway, but came in third with 3,547 votes, to Democrat Grover Ramstack's 6,787 and Republican Walter P. Kuptz's 4,086.
