= Baldwin, Wisconsin =

- Village
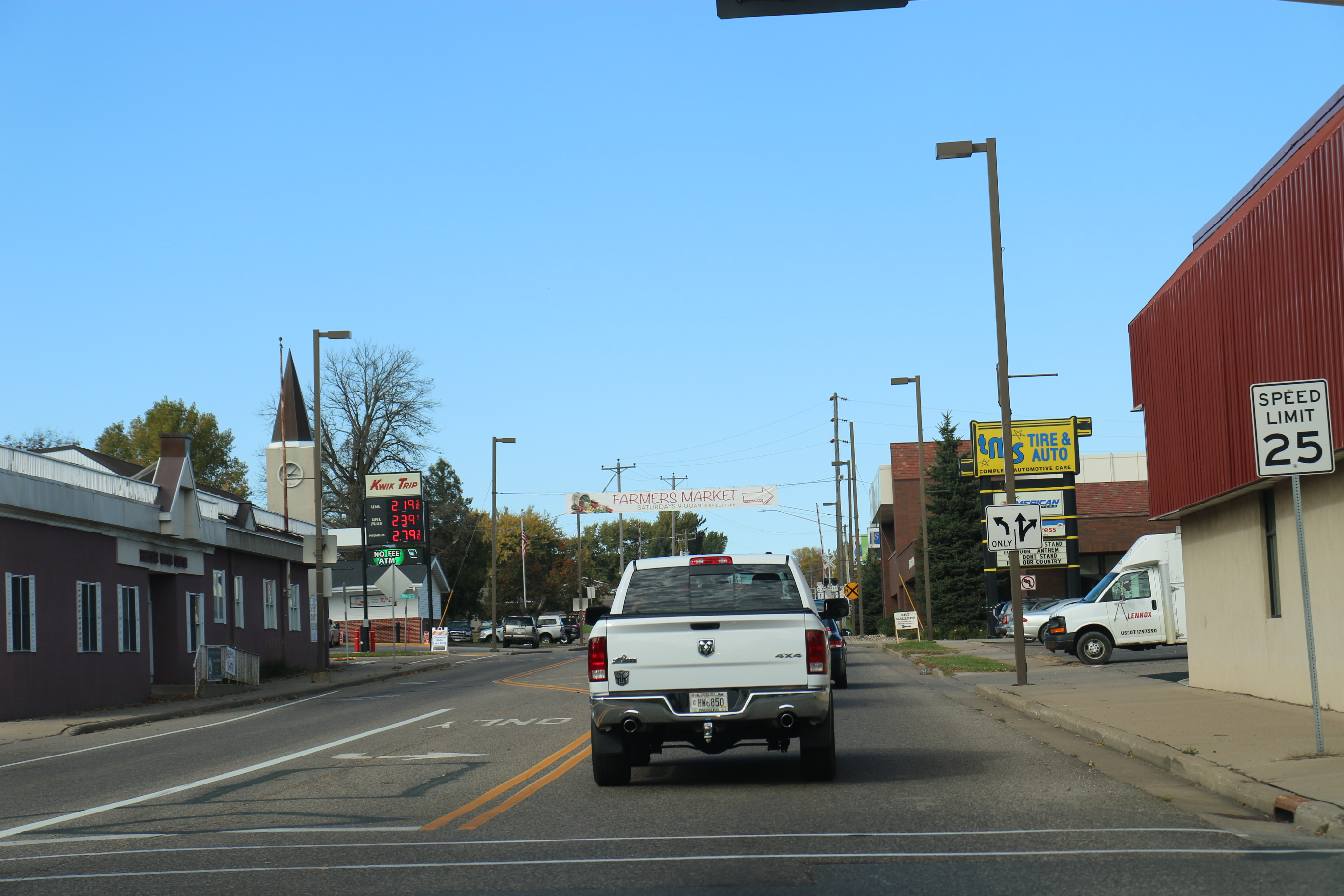
- Downtown Baldwin along U.S. Highway 63
- Motto: "The Biggest Little Town in Wisconsin"
- Location of Baldwin in St. Croix County, Wisconsin

- Location in Wisconsin Baldwin (the United States) Baldwin (North America)
- Coordinates: 44°59′51″N 92°19′44″W
- Country: United States
- State: Wisconsin
- County: St. Croix

Area
  - Total: 3.09 sq mi (8.00 km^{2})
  - Land: 3.09 sq mi (8.00 km^{2})
  - Water: 0 sq mi (0.00 km^{2})
- Elevation: 1,224 ft (373 m)

Population (2020)
  - Total: 4,291
  - Density: 1,390/sq mi (536/km^{2})
- Time zone: UTC-6 (Central (CST))
  - Summer (DST): UTC-5 (CDT)
- Postal code: 54002
- Area codes: 715 & 534
- FIPS code: 55-04400
- GNIS feature ID: 1582743
- Website: www.villageofbaldwin.com

Baldwin is a village in St. Croix County, Wisconsin, United States. The population was 4,291 at the 2020 census. The village is adjacent to the Town of Baldwin.

== History ==
Dana Reed Bailey founded Baldwin in 1871. First known as "Clarksville" after its railroad depot, it was renamed Baldwin after the manager of the Western Wisconsin Railroad, D. A. Baldwin, who was responsible for the railroad through the town.

== Geography ==
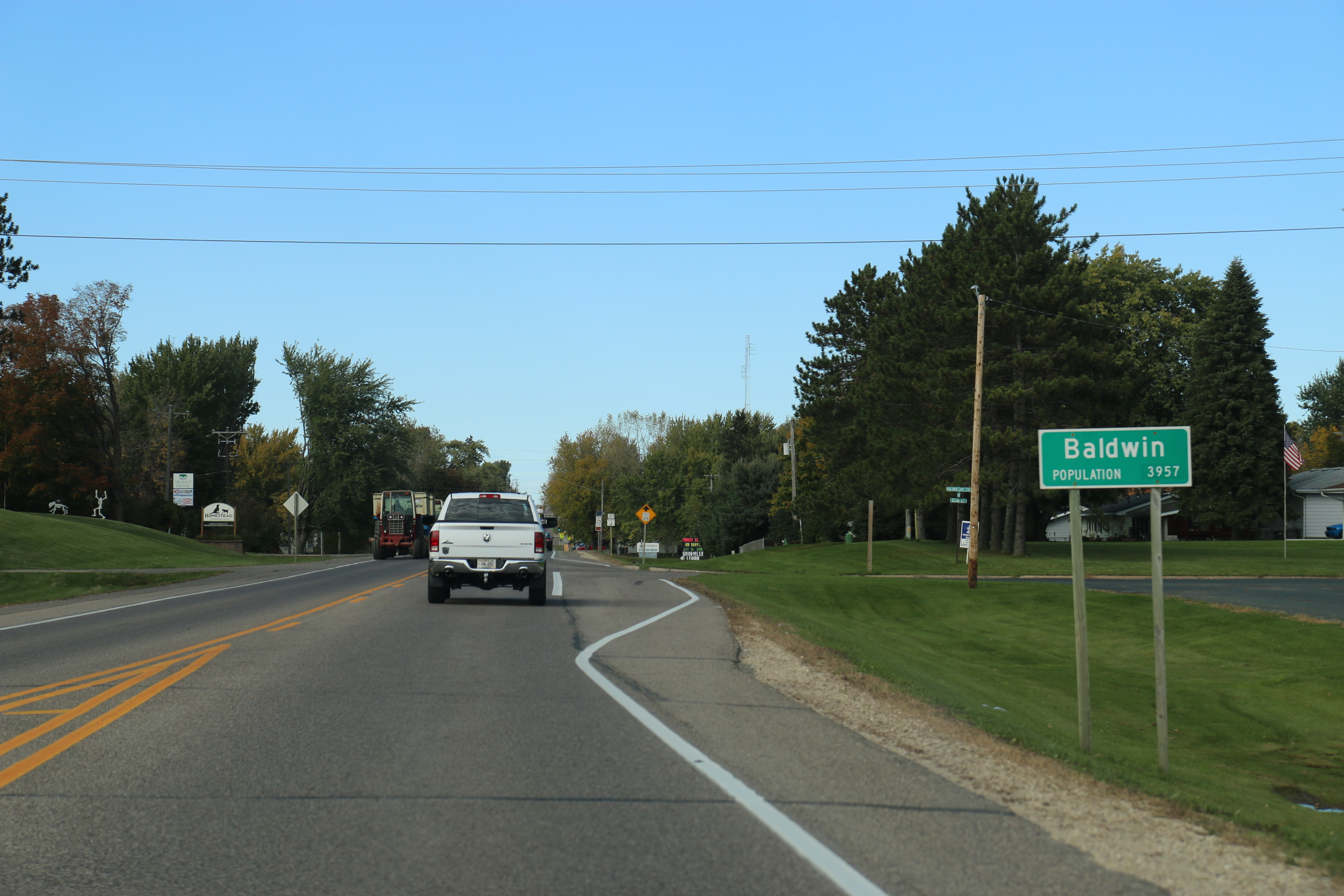
The sign for Baldwin on U.S. Highway 63

According to the United States Census Bureau, the village has an area of 2.91 square miles (7.54 km^{2}), all land.

Baldwin is located at 44°57′51″N 92°22′23″W (44.964401, -92.373251).

The Rush River flows nearby.

Baldwin is along Interstate 94, and U.S. Highways 12 and 63. Other routes include County Road J, Cedar Street, and Main Street. Highway 63 follows 10th Avenue through Baldwin.

Baldwin is 48 miles (77 km) east of Minneapolis, Minnesota, and 49 miles (79 km) west of Eau Claire.

=== Climate ===
Climate data for Baldwin, Wisconsin (1991–2020)
Month	Jan	Feb	Mar	Apr	May	Jun	Jul	Aug	Sep	Oct	Nov	Dec	Year
Mean daily maximum °F (°C)	20.3 (−6.5)	25.9 (−3.4)	37.4 (3.0)	53.9 (12.2)	65.6 (18.7)	75.9 (24.4)	79.3 (26.3)	77.4 (25.2)	71.1 (21.7)	56.2 (13.4)	40.1 (4.5)	26.7 (−2.9)	52.5 (11.4)
Daily mean °F (°C)	11.1 (−11.6)	15.4 (−9.2)	28.3 (−2.1)	43.2 (6.2)	55.2 (12.9)	65.8 (18.8)	69.1 (20.6)	67.1 (19.5)	59.8 (15.4)	46.0 (7.8)	31.8 (−0.1)	18.4 (−7.6)	42.6 (5.9)
Mean daily minimum °F (°C)	1.8 (−16.8)	4.9 (−15.1)	19.2 (−7.1)	32.5 (0.3)	44.8 (7.1)	55.7 (13.2)	59.0 (15.0)	56.7 (13.7)	48.5 (9.2)	35.8 (2.1)	23.4 (−4.8)	10.1 (−12.2)	32.7 (0.4)
Average precipitation inches (mm)	0.81 (21)	0.79 (20)	1.53 (39)	2.76 (70)	3.96 (101)	5.20 (132)	4.13 (105)	4.92 (125)	3.40 (86)	2.79 (71)	1.59 (40)	1.09 (28)	32.97 (838)
Average snowfall inches (cm)	9.4 (24)	8.0 (20)	8.3 (21)	3.3 (8.4)	0.5 (1.3)	0.0 (0.0)	0.0 (0.0)	0.0 (0.0)	0.0 (0.0)	0.4 (1.0)	4.1 (10)	9.4 (24)	43.4 (109.7)
Source: NOAA

== Demographics ==
Historical population
Census	Pop.	Note	%±
1880	591		—
1890	482		−18.4%
1900	631		30.9%
1910	584		−7.4%
1920	666		14.0%
1930	808		21.3%
1940	918		13.6%
1950	1,100		19.8%
1960	1,184		7.6%
1970	1,399		18.2%
1980	1,620		15.8%
1990	2,022		24.8%
2000	2,667		31.9%
2010	3,957		48.4%
2020	4,291		8.4%
U.S. Decennial Census

=== 2010 census ===
At the 2010 census, Baldwin had 3,957 people, 1,572 households, and 1,006 families. The population density was 1,359.8 inhabitants per square mile (525.0/km^{2}). It contained 1,724 housing units at an average density of 592.4 per square mile (228.7/km^{2}). The racial makup of the village was 96.0% White, 0.9% African American, 0.4% Native American, 0.6% Asian, 0.6% from other races, and 1.6% from two or more races. Hispanic or Latino of any race were 1.6%.

Of the 1,572 households, 37.0% had children under the age of 18, 51.7% were married couples living together, 7.8% had a female householder with no husband present, 4.5% had a male householder with no wife present, and 36.0% were non-families. 28.9% of households were one person and 12.1% were one person aged 65 or older. The average household size was 2.48 and the average family size was 3.09.

The age distribution was 24.1% under the age of 18, 10.0% from 18 to 24, 29.0% from 25 to 44, 18.0% from 45 to 64, and 18.9% 65 or older. The median age was 35 years. The female:male ratio was 100:90.9. For every 100 females age 18 and over, the village had 89.3 males.

The median household income was $40,313 and the median family income was $51,250. Males had a median income of $37,216 versus $26,250 for females. The per capita income for the village was $20,748. About 3.0% of families and 5.5% of the population were below the poverty line, including 3.0% of those under age 18 and 5.6% of those age 65 or over.

== Education ==
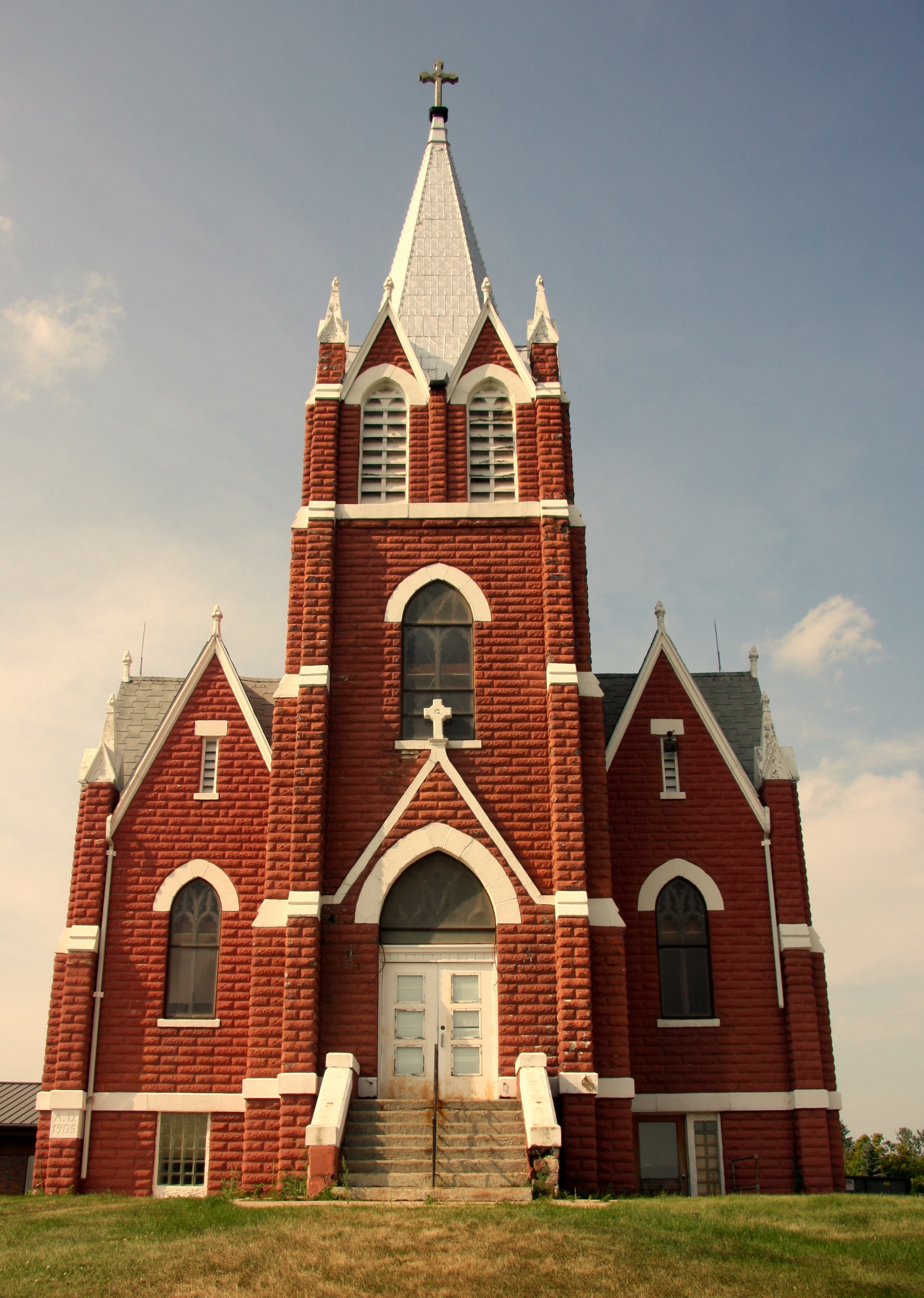
Landmark 1905 "Red Church" just outside Baldwin

There are three public schools in the Baldwin Woodville School District. Greenfield Elementary School and Baldwin-Woodville Area High School are in Baldwin, and Viking Middle School is in Woodville.

== Notable people ==
- Hans A. Aune, Wisconsin state representative, businessman, and educator, born in Baldwin
- Raymond A. Peabody, Wisconsin state representative and businessman, born in Baldwin
- James Patrick Powers, Roman Catholic bishop of the Diocese of Superior, born in Baldwin

== See also ==
- List of villages in Wisconsin
