= Joseph Schmittfranz =

American politician and cheese maker

Joseph Schmittfranz (July 13, 1892 – July 13, 1932) was an American politician and cheese maker.

Born in Chelsea, Wisconsin, Schmittfranz went to Medford High School. He then took the dairy course at University of Wisconsin. Schmittfranz lived in Thorp, Wisconsin and was a cheese maker. He was president of the Wisconsin Cheese Makers Association. In 1931, Schmittfranz served in the Wisconsin State Assembly and was a Republican. On his fortieth birthday, Schmittfranz was at his brother-in-law's house in Black River Falls, Wisconsin. Schmittfranz was target shooting with his brother-in-law when he picked up a rifle. The rifle discharged sending a bullet into his head killing him. The coroner ruled this to be an accident.
