= Alison Aune =

American academic

- Born: Amherst, Massachusetts, U.S.
- Education: University of Massachusetts Amherst, University of Minnesota, Ohio University
- Occupations: Painter, art educator, professor
- Employer: University of Minnesota Duluth
- Known for: Scandinavian-inspired art, art education

Alison Aune is a painter and full professor of art education at the University of Minnesota Duluth. Her work is inspired by Scandinavian patterns and motifs. It draws on a feminist aesthetic, honoring traditional folk arts and domestic arts. Many of her patterns are based on research of Scandinavian textiles and symbols, such as the eight-pointed star. Artists such as Gustav Vigilant, Harriet Backer and Gerhard Mentha have had an important influence on her work.

== Early life and education ==
Born in Amherst, Massachusetts, Aune received her B.F.A. from the University of Massachusetts Amherst (1984), M.A. from the University of Minnesota Duluth (1987) and Ph.D. from Ohio University Athens in 2000.

== Career ==
Aune served as education coordinator at the Tweed Museum of Art from 1991 to 1999 before joining the University of Minnesota Duluth Department of Art and Design. From 1999 to the present, she has been teaching art education and working as an artist.

Aune's scholarly interests include museum-based teacher training, women artists in history, and Nordic art education. She and her students have developed curriculum and intergenerational learning experiences using Scandinavian, Portuguese, Turkish, Finnish and American Indian art. In 2011, she brought a group of art education students to Sweden, Estonia, and Finland. In 2014, she led a Study Abroad course in Scandinavia called "Art for All". Students visited Växjö and Stockholm in Sweden, and Oslo, Norway.

=== Works ===
- 2015 - 2016: Fishnetstockings. An interactive installation created by digital artist Joellyn Rock, computer scientists Logan Sales and Pete Willemsen, visual artist Alison Aune, and a crew of collaborators. Uses layered mix of digital video, text, silhouettes and cutout elements in order to create a participatory space for audience members surrounding ancient lore of mermaids. The installation has been mounted in Bergen, Aarhus, and Duluth.
- 2007-2008: Dekorglädje: Swedish Paintings

=== Art education projects ===
- 2014: Peace Mandala. Along with Mousasi De, visiting lecturer from Indiana University, this project brought together art teachers, art education students, and grade school children to create a peace mandala in Duluth's Piedmont Elementary School.
- 2013: Face of Earth.
- 2006: Metamorphosis of Peace. This is a multi-faceted collaboration integrating art education, painting, digital media and graphic design.

=== Awards and honors ===
Aune has received numerous grants and awards including the Art Educators of Minnesota Higher Educator of the Year award for 2015–2016, a Minnesota Artist Initiative grant, a Fulbright Scholar and Teaching award to Sweden, Grant in Aid grants to conduct a Cross-Cultural Study of the Socio-Aesthetic Goals of Art Education in Scandinavia, the UMD Outstanding Adviser Award, the UMD Albert Tuzla Scholar/Teacher Award, the Art Educator's of Minnesota Museum Educator of the Year award, and a Jerome Foundation International Artist Travel Grant.

2002: Jerome Foundation Grant, with Kirsten Aune, to spend time in Norway and Sweden exploring Scandinavian textile design through direct contact with historic and contemporary textile designs in museums, galleries, and artists studios.

=== Publications ===
Aune has published chapters, articles, and on-line instructional resources on art education and museum-based learning for children and youth. The publication of her book, The Art of Cora Sandal: A Norwegian Painter and Writer, is forthcoming. For this project, she spent a year in Trondheim on an American Scandinavian Foundation fellowship doing research.

=== Exhibitions ===
She has exhibited her artwork in over 70 solo and group exhibitions in the U.S., Sweden, Norway and Denmark and she regularly presents guest lectures and workshops internationally, nationally, and regionally.

- 2012: 4 from the North. Sons of Norway Building. Duluth, MN
- 2007-2008: Dekorglädje: Swedish Paintings. John Steffi Gallery, in the Duluth Art Institute. Duluth, MN.
- 2003: Faces of the Earth. UMass Amherst Fine Arts Center. Amherst, MA.
