= Hans A. Aune =

American politician (1878–1931)

Hans Adolph Aune (December 19, 1878 – February 26, 1931) was an American educator, businessman, and politician.

Aune was born in Baldwin, St. Croix County, Wisconsin. He graduated from Menominie High School and the River Falls Normal School. He was a teacher and school principal. Aune also served as the St. Croix County School Superintendent and worked for a publishing company. Aune served in the Wisconsin Assembly in 1931 as a Republican and a Progressive. He died in office by committing suicide in Madison, Wisconsin from drowning in Lake Monona.

Following his death the seat remained vacant until the next election.
