= Walter P. Kuptz =

American politician and businessman

Walter P. Kuptz (January 1, 1898 – April 27, 1966) was an American politician and businessman.

Born in Milwaukee, Wisconsin, Kuptz served in the United States Army in Europe during World War I. He was a deputy sheriff in Calumet County, Wisconsin. Kuptz also was a steeple jack and later owned Kuptz Service Station. In 1931, Kuptz served in the Wisconsin State Assembly, from Milwaukee, Wisconsin, and was a Republican. He died in Milwaukee, Wisconsin.
