= Charles B. Perry =

American politician

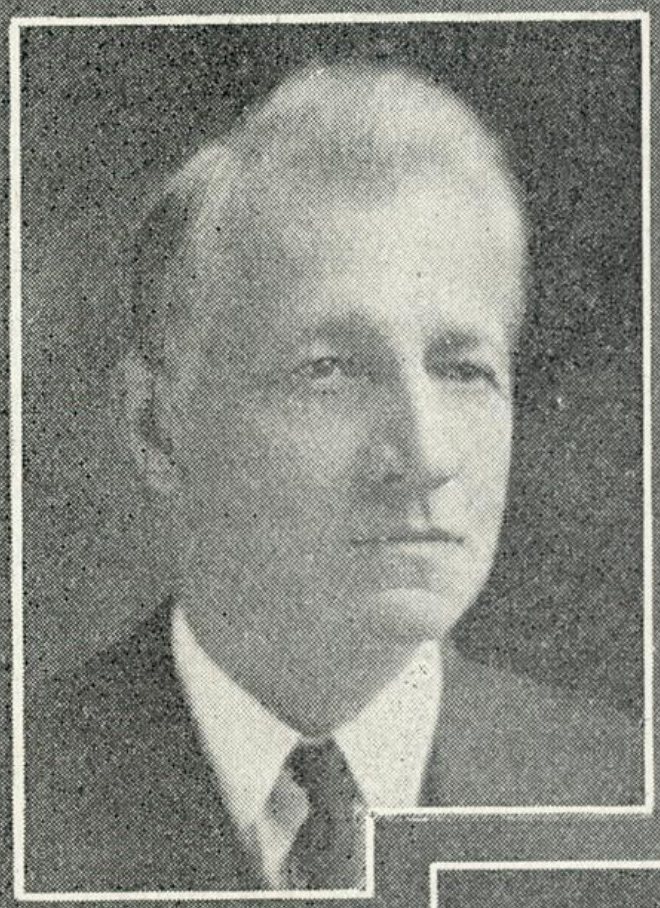
Charles B. Perry

Charles B. Perry (December 9, 1855 – December 17, 1940) was an American lawyer from Wauwatosa, Wisconsin who served as a Republican member and Speaker of the Wisconsin State Assembly.

== Biography ==
Perry was born in New Haven County, Connecticut on December 9, 1855. He attended high school in Cleveland, Ohio. Later, he also attended Central Connecticut State University, Yale Law School and the University of Wisconsin Law School. Perry died on December 17, 1940, in Milwaukee, Wisconsin.

== Career ==
Perry was elected to the Assembly in 1910, 1922, 1924 and 1928 as a Republican. He became Speaker in 1929. Additionally, he was Mayor of Wauwatosa, Wisconsin from 1906 to 1916, as well as City Attorney of Wauwatosa from 1895 to 1905. In 1926, Perry was an Independent candidate for Governor of Wisconsin, losing to Fred R. Zimmerman.
