= Operation PBHistory =

1954 CIA operation in Guatemala

Operation PBHistory was a covert operation carried out in Guatemala by the United States Central Intelligence Agency (CIA). It followed Operation PBSuccess, which led to the overthrow of Guatemalan President Jacobo Árbenz in June 1954 and ended the Guatemalan Revolution. PBHistory attempted to use documents left behind by Árbenz's government and by organizations related to the communist Guatemalan Party of Labor to demonstrate that the Guatemalan government had been under the influence of the Soviet Union, and to use those documents to obtain further intelligence that would be useful to US intelligence agencies. It was an effort to justify the overthrow of the elected Guatemalan government in response to the negative international reactions to PBSuccess. The CIA also hoped to improve its intelligence resources about communist parties in Latin America, a subject on which it had little information.

The first phase of the operation began soon after Árbenz's resignation on June 27, 1954: several agents were dispatched to Guatemala beginning on July 4. These included agents of the CIA and the Office of Intelligence Research (OIR). The first phase involved the collection of 150,000 documents from sources including Árbenz's personal possessions, trade union offices, and police agencies. The ruling military junta led by Carlos Castillo Armas aided these efforts. Following a presentation made to US President Dwight Eisenhower on July 20, a decision was taken to accelerate the operation, and the number of people working in Guatemala was increased. The new team members posed as unaffiliated with the US government to maintain plausible deniability. The operation helped set up the Guatemalan National Committee of Defense Against Communism, which was covertly funded by the CIA: agents of the committee became involved in PBHistory. The team studied over 500,000 documents in total, and finished processing documents on September 28, 1954.

PBHistory documents were used to support the CIA's existing operations Kufire and Kugown, which sought to track Latin American communists and to disseminate information critical of the Árbenz government. Documents were also shared with the Kersten Committee of the US House of Representatives, which publicized PBHistory within the US. The documents uncovered by the operation proved useful to the Guatemalan intelligence agencies, enabling the creation of a register of suspected communists. Operation PBHistory did not succeed in its chief objective of finding evidence that the Guatemalan communists were being controlled by the Soviet government, and was unable to counter the international narrative that the United States had toppled the government of Jacobo Árbenz to serve the interests of the United Fruit Company.

== Background and origins ==
The October Revolution of 1944 in Guatemala led to the election of Juan José Arévalo as President of Guatemala, who initiated reforms based on liberal capitalism. Arévalo was an anti-communist, and cracked down on the communist Guatemalan Party of Labor (Partido Guatemalteco del Trabajo, PGT). The US government was nonetheless suspicious that he was under the influence of the Soviet Union. Arévalo's defense minister Jacobo Árbenz was elected president in 1950. Influenced partly by McCarthyism, the US government was predisposed to see communist influence in Árbenz's government, particularly after the legalization of the PGT. Árbenz also had personal ties to some PGT members. In 1952 Árbenz began an agrarian reform program that transferred uncultivated land from large landowners to poor laborers in return for compensation. In response the US-based United Fruit Company, which had large landholdings in Guatemala, intensively lobbied the US government for Árbenz's overthrow.

US President Dwight Eisenhower authorized a Central Intelligence Agency (CIA) operation to overthrow Árbenz, code-named Operation PBSuccess in August 1953. Within the CIA, the operation was headed by Frank Wisner, who had worked in the US intelligence services since World War II. While preparations for Operation PBSuccess were underway, the US government issued a series of statements denouncing the Guatemalan government, alleging that it had been infiltrated by communists. On June 18, 1954 Carlos Castillo Armas, a Guatemalan army Colonel in exile since a failed coup in 1949, led an invasion force of 480 men into Guatemala. The invasion was supported by a campaign of psychological warfare, which presented Castillo Armas's victory as a fait accompli to the Guatemalan people. Worried by the possibility of a US invasion, the Guatemalan army refused to fight, and on June 27 Árbenz resigned.

A map showing the position of the Republic of Guatemala in North America

The actions of the United States resulted in international outrage. Media outlets across the world accused the US of sponsoring a coup to reverse Árbenz's agrarian reform in the interests of the United Fruit Company. This criticism was influenced by the coverage put out by media outlets in communist-controlled countries, but was repeated in the media in countries that were US allies, with Britain's Labour Party and the Swedish Social Democratic Party joining in. Latin American opposition to the US reached a new peak: author Daniel James stated that "No one could recall so intense and universal a wave of anti-US sentiment in the entire history of Latin America." Although people within the US saw the coup as a triumph for US foreign policy, CIA officials felt that in order for Operation PBSuccess to be termed a success, further action was needed. Thus, the CIA was interested in finding documents that would allow it to portray the administration of Árbenz as being controlled by Soviet communists, and thus to justify the coup.

Due to the quick overthrow of the Árbenz government, the CIA believed that the government and the PGT leaders would not have been able to destroy any incriminating documents, and that these could be analyzed to demonstrate Árbenz's supposed ties to the Soviet Union. According to historian Nick Cullather, Wisner hoped to "expose Soviet machinations throughout the hemisphere". The CIA also believed that it could better understand the workings of Latin American communist parties, on which subject the CIA had very little information. Although there had been an active communist movement in Latin America since 1919, it had largely been clandestine, and the CIA knew little about the methods that parties like the PGT used. The CIA hoped that PGT records left behind in haste would enable its international Communism Division to reconstruct the party's leadership and organizational structure, and possibly do the same for other communist parties in the region.

The CIA also hoped to exploit the aftermath of the coup to bolster its own intelligence resources. Wisner, who was serving as Deputy Director for Plans at the time of the coup, hoped to recruit agents both from among communists who wanted to defect, and from other Guatemalans who might become a part of the new government. In Wisner's words, he wished to identify "people who can be controlled and exploited to further US policy". Furthermore, the agency hoped to use the findings of the operation to demonstrate the extent of Soviet influence for propaganda purposes, and also to use the information gathered to eliminate any communist influence in Guatemala.

== Document analysis ==
=== First phase ===
On June 30, 1954, three days after the resignation of Árbenz, Wisner sent a telegram that later became known as the "shift of gears cable". Two agents from the CIA, and two from the Office of Intelligence Research (OIR), arrived in Guatemala City on July 4. Castillo Armas had arrived in the capital on the previous day to assume the presidency. One of the CIA officers was Lothar Metzl, who was on the counterintelligence staff of the CIA. Metzl was an Austrian, who had studied communist movements since the 1930s, including in Europe. In Wisner's words, the agents were supposed to perform a "snatch job on documents while the melon was freshly burst open".

The initial targets of the operation were the personal possessions and documents of Árbenz and those of Carlos Enrique Díaz (who had been chief of the armed forces under Árbenz, and briefly his successor as president), the offices of trade unions, known front organizations, police agencies, and the headquarters of the Partido Guatemalteco del Trabajo (PGT). The results of the initial searches were disappointing for the CIA; many of the offices had already been plundered both by the Guatemalan army and by other looters. The CIA were particularly interested in finding documents that mentioned the Árbenz government's purchase of weapons from Czechoslovakia, but they were unsuccessful. They were also unsuccessful in finding any evidence that the Soviet Union had controlled the communist movement in Guatemala.

Despite these difficulties, the agents collected 150,000 documents, in addition to a number of government files, which the agency judged to be useful. The CIA received assistance in collecting these from Castillo Armas's junta, and from the Guatemalan army. The haul was described as the "greatest catch of documents ever left behind by a Communist Party and its auxiliaries". Most of these had nothing but "local significance". Although no documents were discovered demonstrating Soviet influence, the CIA hoped to use the large number of papers to show that the communists in Guatemala had had a large influence over the government, through institutions like labor unions, peasant organizations, student unions, and youth groups.

On July 20, the CIA agents presented the results of their first two weeks of work in Washington. At Wisner's request, Tracy Barnes—principal manager of CIA operations in PBSuccess—created a booklet from these documents to show to US President Dwight Eisenhower. The 23 documents in the booklet included communist literature owned by Árbenz, such as a Chinese study on agrarian reform and some Marxist volumes, as well as diplomatic records implying communist sympathies, and a biography of Joseph Stalin belonging to Árbenz's wife Maria Cristina Villanova. After the presentation, Wisner decided that the examination of the seized documents needed to proceed faster, and so expanded the group of agents working in Guatemala.

One of the aims of the new team was to help Castillo Armas establish an intelligence agency that would be able to fight communism in Guatemala. Castillo Armas was pressured to create an anti-communist task force, which he did on July 20—creating the National Committee of Defense Against Communism (Comité de Defensa Nacional contra el Comunismo). The purpose of this group was to create an anti-communist bureaucracy and intelligence service and to organize records and facilitate PBHistory. The Comité secretly received funds from the CIA, with the understanding that this fact could prove "very embarrassing" and that a new source would eventually need to be found. Although the Comité was theoretically an intelligence agency, it also had some police powers. It could order the arrest of anybody suspected of being a communist, and had oversight over all army and police authorities. The CIA team was supposed to help it set up by creating a nucleus of information about people associated with the PGT.

The Comité was not, however, granted the power to arrest or search the house of prominent government officials who had served under Árbenz. This was largely because Castillo Armas and other military leaders lacked trust in the Comité. Nevertheless, the Comité was able to conduct personal searches of exiles as they left the country. This proved to be ineffective as very few documents proved to be revealing.

=== Second phase ===
We again call to your attention and that of entire PBHistory team the extreme importance of any and all documentary evidence tending to establish contacts, connections and courses of dealing as between Árbenz regime and/or [the Guatemalan] Communist Party and leaders on the one hand, and Moscow–Prague and international Communist organization on the other hand. [U.S. embassy] particularly keen obtain any such documentary evidence soonest possible to assist in tying down allegations still made in some quarters that [the Guatemalan] Communist apparatus was purely indigenous affair, not directed, controlled or guided by world Communist [headquarters].

— Telegram from CIA headquarters to CIA station in Guatemala, on August 9, 1954.

On August 4, a new and larger US contingent was deployed to Guatemala. In order to remain covert, this group identified itself to Armas as the "Social Research Group", composed of businessmen and experts from universities. It consisted of eight CIA officers, three men from the State Department, and one from the US Information Agency. It was led by an officer working under the pseudonym "Francis T. Mylkes," and included David Atlee Phillips, who was fluent in Spanish and had been part of the PBSuccess team. The group presented itself as unaffiliated with the US government in order to avoid nationalist backlash and to maintain plausible deniability. The new PBHistory group worked directly with the new Guatemalan Comité training its 25 agents and using them to procure documents; the training covered topics including screening, organizing, and classifying confiscated documents, as well as "the rudiments of mail control, logging, abstracting, and cryptic reference".

Eventually, the 25 personnel of the Comité joined the CIA officers in sorting and processing the seized documents. The CIA officers had a separate side entrance to the building in which the operations took place, in order to maintain the image that the operation was a Guatemalan internal affair. The task of sorting through the papers proved to be daunting: by September, the main index of the material contained 15,800 cards. All hand-written material was preserved, and multiple copies of printed material were kept. Every document had to be reproduced, because the original copies of each one were to remain in Guatemala. Approximately half of the paper that had been gathered was incinerated. The CIA gave the highest priority to the documents seized from the PGT.

By September 1954, the PBHistory agents had found only a few top secret documents. Some documents showed that government officials and communist party leaders had been able to dispose of most of the sensitive material before they left. In the period of uncertain leadership that followed Árbenz's overthrow, a member of one of the series of ruling juntas had prevented the Comité from searching the homes of private citizens, and from arresting them, which potentially reduced the number of sensitive documents the CIA had access to. Additionally, Castillo Armas stated after taking power that the intelligence information of the army had been completely destroyed.

The CIA finished processing documents on September 28, 1954. By this point, the agents had parsed through more than 500,000 unique documents. Photostatic copies were taken of 2,095 important documents, 750 photographs of the material were published for the use of the media, and 50,000 documents were microfilmed. Copies of a handful of important documents were distributed to the various agencies that had been a part of PBHistory, as well as the US Federal Bureau of Investigation.

== Document exploitation ==
The agencies that participated in Operation PBHistory had different aims in mind for the products of the operation. The CIA was most interested in using the information gathered against communist movements in Latin America and elsewhere. The State Department wanted to use them to reconstruct the history of the communist party within Guatemala, while the highest priority of the United States Information Agency was to use the documents to release information that could be used to change international opinion. The agents in charge of the operation were expected to balance these interests: however, as the organization behind the operation, the CIA had veto power over any public use. The work done by the PBHistory team assisted two existing CIA operations, Operation Kufire and Operation Kugown, both of which had been a part of Operation PBSuccess.

=== Operation Kufire ===
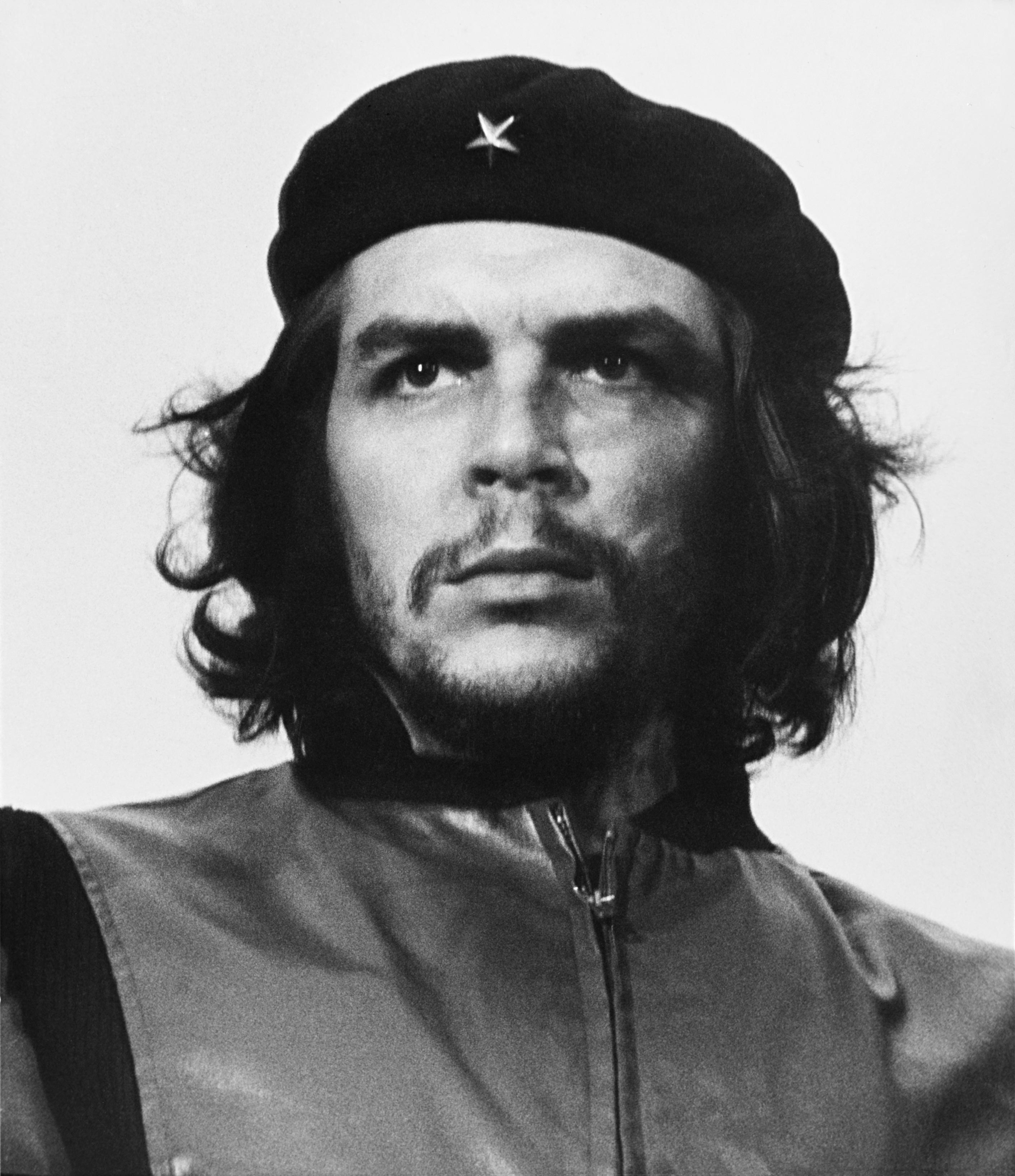
Cuban revolutionary Ernesto "Che" Guevara. The CIA opened a file on him as a consequence of Operation PBHistory and Operation Kufire, while he was still only known as a physician.

Operation Kufire was a wide-ranging effort to track communists from various countries across Latin America who had come to Guatemala during the presidency of Árbenz. The CIA expected that these individuals would return to their home countries, or to other countries that had liberal policies about political asylum, and by tracking them, the CIA hoped to disrupt their activities. During the course of this operation, a CIA analyst asked Philips whether to open a file on a 25-year-old physician, who did not at the time appear to be particularly threatening. Philips said yes, thereby opening a file on Ernesto "Che" Guevara, which would quickly become one of the thickest files the CIA had on a single individual. Che's name was added to a secret CIA kill list of individuals targeted for assassination. Few other documents resulted in files that were of enduring value to the CIA.

=== Operation Kugown ===
Operation Kugown was the name given to the psychological warfare operation that had played an important part in the overthrow of Árbenz. During the coup, its primary targets had been the Árbenz government. After the conclusion of the coup, Kugown continued, targeting the rest of Guatemala, and the wider international audience. The aim of the operation was to disseminate derogatory information about Árbenz, and to convince Guatemalans—and the rest of the world—that Árbenz's regime had been communist-dominated. The use of documents from PBHistory for Operation Kugown began in August 1954. The standard method employed by the CIA was to select a document that could be portrayed as incriminating and write an explanation covering it. This would then be released to the press by the Comité, so that the local agency could receive some credit. The Comité also released a short documentary film, titled Después Descubrimos La Verdad ("Later We Discovered the Truth"). Through these avenues news media in Guatemala and elsewhere in Central America were saturated with stories of how the Árbenz government had been controlled by communists.

While the press releases had a substantial impact within Guatemala, the CIA was unable to staunch the continued criticism of the US role in the coup, which came from virtually all countries except for West Germany and the US itself. Very few news agencies chose to run the press releases from the Comité, even though a number of them were put out. Information was sent to press agencies worldwide describing infiltration by the PGT and links among Communists elsewhere; nonetheless, their impact remained minimal. The lack of attention frustrated the PBHistory agents to the point where they planned to stage a false flag attack on their own headquarters, which would later be described as the work of Guatemala's remaining communists. However, the CIA decided that such an attack would need the cooperation of too many "indigenous" people, and the plan was scrapped as being too risky. Operation Kugown also released a large quantity of communist propaganda material that had entered Guatemala from countries within the Soviet sphere of influence; these convinced American journalists such as Donald Grant, of the St. Louis Post-Dispatch, that there must have been a connection between Árbenz and the Soviet government. Ultimately, these operations were unsuccessful in convincing Latin America that the 1954 coup was justified.

=== Kersten committee ===
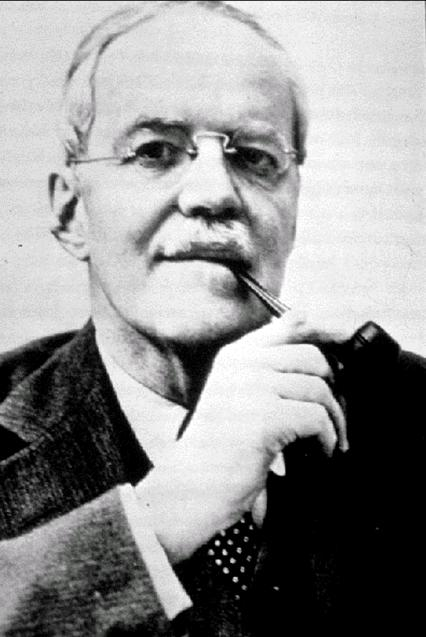
CIA Director Allen Dulles, who channeled information to the Kersten committee to prevent the committee from unintentionally disrupting CIA operations

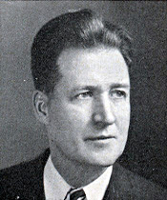
Charles Kersten, head of the Kersten Committee

Information from the PBHistory documents was disseminated by the officials of both the US and Guatemalan governments. US ambassador Henry Cabot Lodge made use of 21 documents in a speech he made at the United Nations. Information was also funnelled to US ambassadors and Congresspeople. The US Congress in 1954 was among the few Republican controlled Congresses in many years. Republicans sought to use an anti-communist push to generate support for themselves and to erode the voting base of the Democratic Party. Anti-Communist members of the US Congress, such as Charles J. Kersten and Patrick J. Hillings of the Kersten Committee, enthusiastically involved themselves with PBHistory. By August 1954, Kersten was receiving PBHistory documents from Dulles so he could use them in speeches to Congress about the Soviet Union's influence in Guatemala. In September and October 1954, the Kersten Committee held hearings purportedly investigating the penetration of communist influence. PBHistory documents were used in this process, and Castillo Armas became the first head of state to testify before a US Congress committee (although he did so through the use of a tape recording of his testimony). Although the hearings did little to unearth information about communist presence in Guatemala, they provided Operation PBHistory with huge publicity within the US.

At the same time, the involvement of the Kersten committee and of Kersten and Hillings caused concern for the CIA. Dulles constantly worried that their investigation would damage CIA operations, particularly when Hillings visited Guatemala shortly before PBSuccess was to begin. Congresspeople had not officially been informed of the CIA's role in the coup, and Dulles wished to keep them uninformed. By supplying them with PBHistory documents, Dulles hoped to forestall them from inadvertently exposing the CIA's other projects. Following the hearings, a subcommittee headed by Hillings produced a final report. In addition to stating without evidence that the Guatemalan government had been acting under orders from the Soviet Union, this report falsely claimed that Soviet weapons had been brought covertly to Guatemala by submarine. This unintentionally drew attention to Operation Washtub, a CIA effort to foist incriminating weapons on the Guatemalan government.

=== Other uses ===
Once the CIA had stopped using the documents for propaganda purposes, the agents in charge of PBHistory decided that the best use of the documents they had uncovered would be to record the growth of the communist movement in Guatemala. This research was undertaken by the US State Department's Office of Intelligence Research. The OIR produced a 50-page report after five months of work; the State Department considered it the "definitive answer" to the question of how communism had arisen in Guatemala. The government of Honduras, which had allowed its territory to be used as a "staging area" for the coup against Árbenz, also made use of the PBHistory papers to justify its position. It argued that it had been facing interference in its internal matters from communists in Guatemala.

== Aftermath and analysis ==
Max Holland, analyzing PBHistory in 2004, wrote that although very few highly sensitive communist documents were found, the operation provided the CIA with its first detailed look at the development of a powerful communist movement. It also allowed them to set up a Guatemalan service that would work against the communists, and for these reasons, the CIA judged the operation to be a success. Historian Kate Doyle stated that the documents uncovered by PBHistory allowed the CIA to create a register of suspected communists. The documents were described by participants as an "intelligence goldmine"; the register that the CIA left with the Guatemalan security forces contained information on thousands of citizens.

PBHistory documents were used for years afterward to discredit Árbenz (living in exile) and to counter Soviet propaganda about American imperialism in Guatemala. When Árbenz moved to Montevideo in 1957, the CIA used the PBHistory documents to produce a biography of Árbenz that described him as a Soviet agent, in an attempt to prevent him from moving to Mexico, where opposition to Castillo Armas' regime was coalescing. Nonetheless, Árbenz remained a symbol of principled resistance to the United States, helped in part by Soviet propaganda to that effect. When some PBHistory documents were published, they received little attention in Latin America. Though PBSuccess was viewed positively within the US soon after it occurred, the violence perpetrated by the Guatemalan governments supported by the US in the 1970s and 1980s changed the perception of the coup among the US public.

Despite the report produced by the Office of Intelligence Research, by 1957 the CIA realized that its version of the history of the Árbenz government and the coup was not gaining traction. Books written by defenders of the Árbenz government, which were strongly critical of the US intervention, were generally better received. Nationalist Latin Americans were inclined to view the Castillo Armas government as a creation of the US. As a result, the US government decided to allow Ronald Schneider, a historian who was in the process of completing his Ph.D., to access the PBHistory archive. Schneider published Communism in Guatemala: 1944 to 1954 in 1959. Later observers have stated that the publication may have been subsidized in some way by the CIA: both the Foreign Policy Research Institute, where Schneider worked, and Frederick A. Praeger, who published Schneider's book, received CIA funds. Schneider stated in his book that the Comité was responsible for collecting the documents he accessed, but did not mention the CIA's role in funding the Comité, nor did he explain how the documents came to the US. Schneider's book did not rely on PBHistory material alone, but also on information that he gathered during a trip to Mexico and Guatemala in 1957. The book was generally well received.

The operation failed in its main purpose, which was to find evidence that the government of Árbenz was under Soviet control. A CIA report published on October 1, 1954, stated that "'very few' 'Communist damaging' documents had been found". The US failed to persuade Latin Americans of its point of view on communism: most people viewed the reforms of the Guatemalan Revolution in a positive light, and even Schneider's account, described by Holland as a balanced portrayal, was unable to persuade the public that the Soviet Union was involved in the rise of Guatemalan communism. Political scientist Jeremy Gunn, who was given access to the material collected by the operation, stated that it "found no traces of Soviet control and substantial evidence that Guatemalan Communists acted alone, without support or guidance from outside the country". Nothing useful was discovered with respect to international communism either. In contrast, the Soviet government's portrayal was of a Guatemalan government that did not threaten the interests of the US, but which was nonetheless overthrown in order to protect the United Fruit Company. Over time, this description of the events became the favored one in Latin America.

The Soviet narrative was further strengthened in 1957, when Castillo Armas was overthrown and replaced with a highly reactionary government which further rolled back the reforms of the 1944 revolution; the Eisenhower administration did not react to the coup in any significant way. When Richard Nixon, then US vice-president, visited Latin America in 1958, he encountered severe abuse wherever he went, even from people who were not communists or their sympathizers. PBHistory was also unable to change the strong resentment against the CIA that the Guatemalan coup had created. Writing in 2008 Gunn compared PBHistory to a similarly unsuccessful attempt by the US to justify the invasion of Iraq after it had occurred. Historian Mark Hove has written that "Operation PBHistory proved ineffective because of 'a new, smoldering resentment' that had emerged in Latin America over US intervention in Guatemala."

== Sources ==
- Cullather, Nick (1999). Secret History: The CIA's Classified Account of Its Operations in Guatemala, 1952–1954. Palo Alto, California: Stanford University Press. ISBN 978-0-8047-3311-3.
- Doyle, Kate (September–October 1997). "The Art of the Coup: A Paper Trail of Covert Actions in Guatemala". NACLA Report on the Americas. 31 (2): 34–41. doi:10.1080/10714839.1997.11725715. ProQuest 748689317.
- Forster, Cindy (2001). The Time of Freedom: Campesino Workers in Guatemala's October Revolution. Pittsburgh, Pennsylvania: University of Pittsburgh Press. ISBN 978-0-8229-4162-0.
- Gleijeses, Piero (1991). Shattered Hope: The Guatemalan Revolution and the United States, 1944–1954. Princeton, New Jersey: Princeton University Press. ISBN 978-0-691-02556-8.
- Grant, Donald (1955). "Guatemala and United States Foreign Policy". Journal of International Affairs. 9 (1): 64–72. JSTOR 24355574.
- Grant, Donald (June 30, 1954). "Power of Communists Broken in Guatemala: Peace Talk Scheduled". St. Louis Post-Dispatch. p. 1 – via newspapers.com.
- Gunn, T. Jeremy (2008). Spiritual Weapons: The Cold War and the Forging of an American National Religion. Westport, Connecticut: Greenwood Publishing group. ISBN 978-0-313-04326-0.
- Holland, Max (2004). "Operation PBHistory: The Aftermath of SUCCESS". International Journal of Intelligence and CounterIntelligence. 17 (2): 300–332. doi:10.1080/08850600490274935. S2CID 153570470.
- Holly, Susan K.; Patterson, David S., eds. (2003). Foreign Relations of the United States, 1952–1954: Guatemala. Washington, DC: Government Printing Office. ISBN 978-0-16-051304-6.
- Hove, Mark T. (September 2007). "The Árbenz Factor: Salvador Allende, U.S.-Chilean Relations, and the 1954 U.S. Intervention in Guatemala". Diplomatic History. 31 (4): 623–663. doi:10.1111/j.1467-7709.2007.00656.x.
- Immerman, Richard H. (1982). The CIA in Guatemala: The Foreign Policy of Intervention. Austin, Texas: University of Texas Press. ISBN 978-0-292-71083-2.
- Jacobsen, Annie (2019). Surprise, Kill, Vanish, The Secret History of CIA Paramilitary Armies, Operators, and Assassins. New York: Hachette. ISBN 978-0-316-44140-7.
- James, Daniel (1954). Red Design for the Americas: Guatemalan Prelude. New York: John Day.
- Jiménez, Hugo Murillo (1985). "La intervención Norteamericana en Guatemala en 1954. Dos interpretaciones recientes". Anuario de Estudios Centroamericanos. 11 (2): 149–155.
- Rabe, Stephen (November 2004). "Feature Review: The U.S. Intervention in Guatemala: The Documentary Record". Diplomatic History. 28 (5): 785–790. doi:10.1111/j.1467-7709.2004.00450.x.
- Schlesinger, Stephen; Kinzer, Stephen (1999). Bitter Fruit: The Story of the American Coup in Guatemala. Cambridge, Massachusetts: Harvard University Press. ISBN 978-0-674-01930-0.
- Streeter, Stephen M. (2000). Managing the Counterrevolution: The United States and Guatemala, 1954–1961. Athens, Ohio: Ohio University Press. ISBN 978-0-89680-215-5.
