= Andrew Biemiller =

American politician (1906–1982)

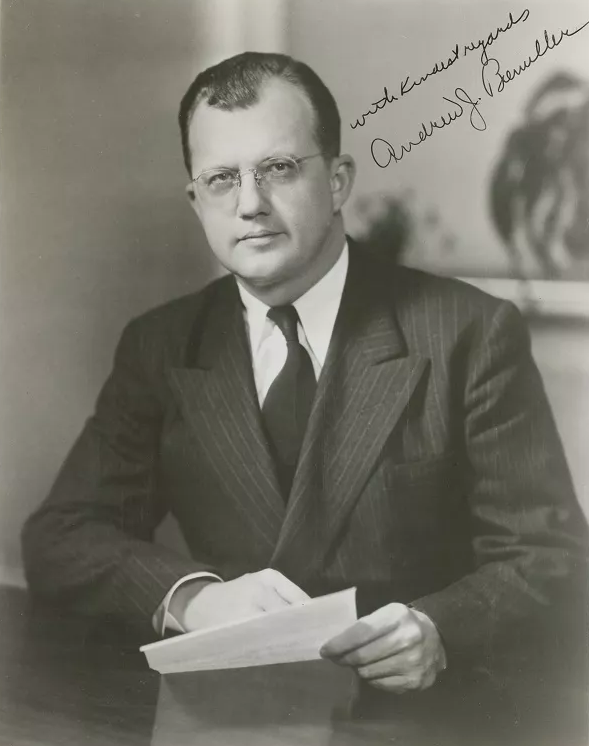
- Biemiller c. 1945

Member of the U.S. House of Representatives from Wisconsin's 5th district
- In office January 3, 1949 – January 3, 1951
- Preceded by: Charles J. Kersten
- Succeeded by: Charles J. Kersten
- In office January 3, 1945 – January 3, 1947
- Preceded by: Howard J. McMurray
- Succeeded by: Charles J. Kersten

Member of the Wisconsin State Assembly from the Milwaukee 2nd district
- In office January 4, 1937 – January 4, 1943
- Preceded by: Clarence Kretlow
- Succeeded by: Michael F. O'Connell

Personal details
- Born: July 23, 1906 Sandusky, Ohio, U.S.
- Died: April 3, 1982 (aged 75) Bethesda, Maryland, U.S.
- Party: Socialist (before 1935); Progressive (1935–1946); Democratic (after 1946)
- Spouse: Hannah Perot Morris (m. 1929)
- Children: Andrew Jr.; Nancy
- Education: Cornell University (B.A.); University of Pennsylvania (attended)

Andrew John Biemiller (July 23, 1906 – April 3, 1982) was an American politician and labor union officer who served as a Wisconsin State Assemblyman from 1937 to 1943, as a U.S. Representative from 1945 to 1947 and again from 1949 to 1951, and as the AFL-CIO's chief lobbyist from 1956 to 1978.

== Early life ==
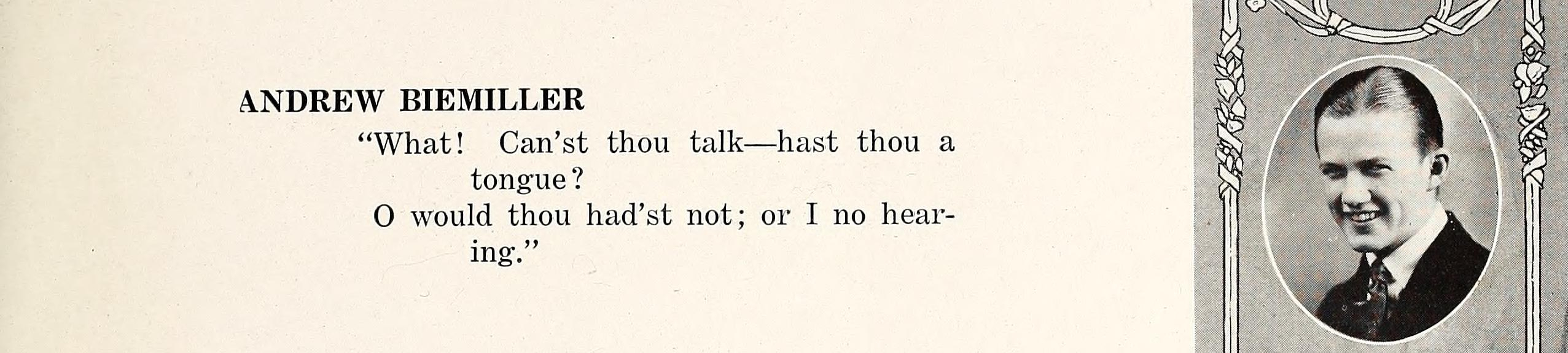
Biemiller in the Sandusky High School yearbook, 1922

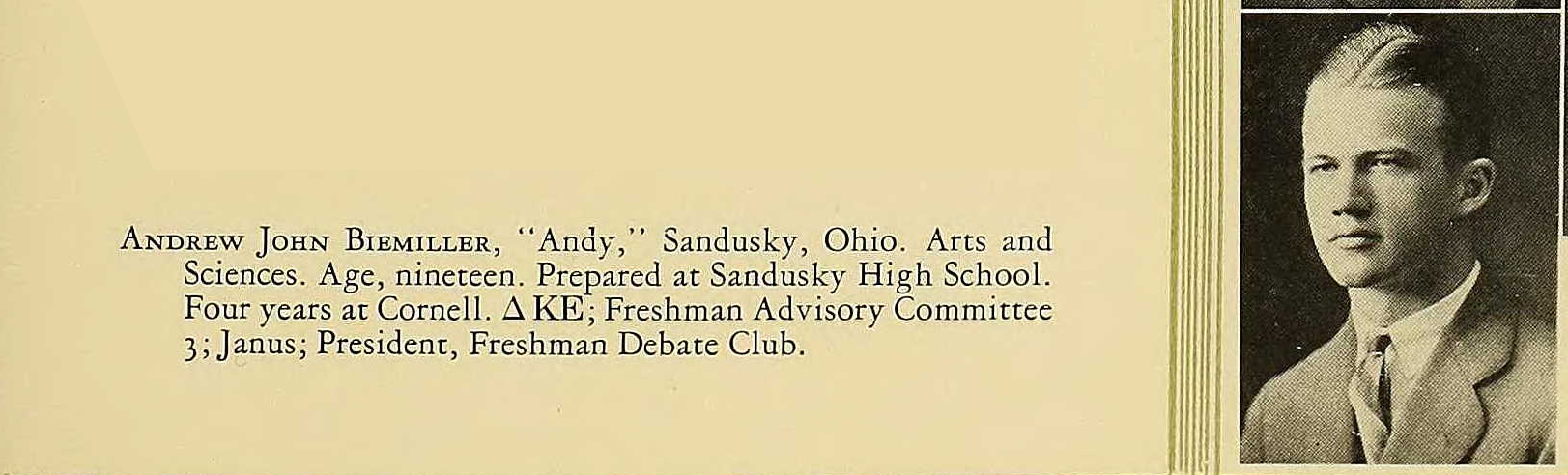
Biemiller in the Cornell University yearbook, 1926

Biemiller was born in Sandusky, Ohio on July 23, 1906, into "one of the wealthiest families" in the city, and was educated in the public schools there. He got a B.A. degree from Cornell University in 1926, was an instructor in history at Syracuse University from 1926 to 1928, and then studied in the graduate school of the University of Pennsylvania from 1929 to 1931, teaching undergraduate classes, as well as teaching at Bryn Mawr Summer School for Workers (1930–31). He married Hannah Perot Morris in 1929.

Biemiller began speaking on socialism as early as 1929, and by 1930 he was a member of the Socialist Party of America, serving on the board of directors of the League for Industrial Democracy and as secretary of its Philadelphia branch. In 1932, he was elected chairman of the education and literature committee of the Philadelphia County Socialist Party, and was a campaign manager for Norman Thomas, Socialist candidate for president. In 1933, Biemiller went to Milwaukee to work for the party, serving as educational director of the party from 1933 to 1936, editing the Milwaukee Leader (a Socialist newspaper) from 1934 to 1936, and working with various organizations.

In addition to the Socialist Party, Biemiller became an active member of the Farmer-Labor Progressive Federation. He was a member of the American Federation of Teachers, and the American Newspaper Guild, served on the executive board of the Milwaukee Federated Trades Council and was vice-president of the Wisconsin Turner District.

== Political career ==
=== Assembly ===
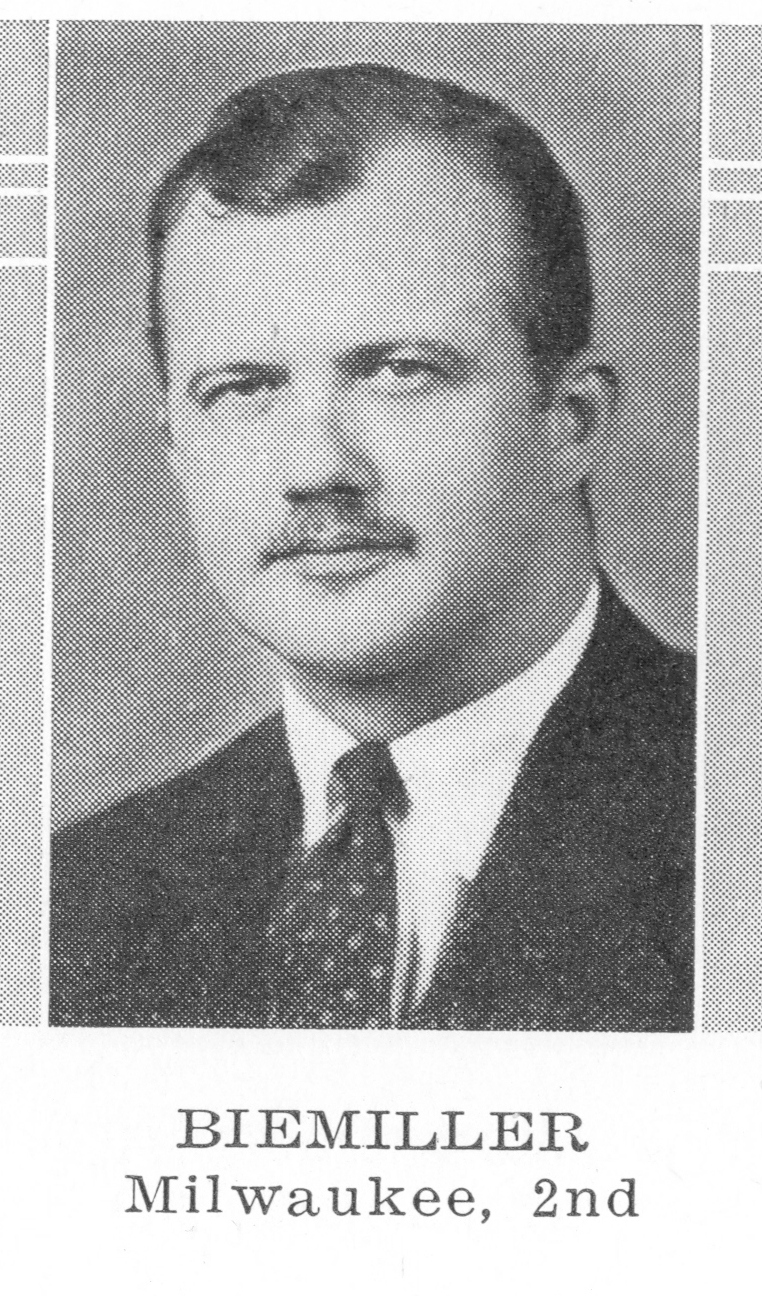
Biemiller's official State Assembly portrait, 1940

In 1936 he was elected to the Wisconsin State Assembly on the ticket of the Wisconsin Progressive Party (the Socialists and Progressives were practicing a form of electoral fusion during this period; his biography clearly identified him as an active Socialist) from the 2nd Milwaukee County district (the 2nd and 10th Wards of the City of Milwaukee), unseating Democratic incumbent Clarence Kretlow, with 6,767 votes to 5867 for Kretlow and 2129 for Republican Alex Klose. He was appointed to the standing committees on the judiciary and public welfare, to a special joint committee on "Legislation on Administration of State Government", and perhaps most importantly to the "Interim Committee" appointed in 1937 by the Legislature to discuss reorganization of Wisconsin government.

He was re-elected in 1938, with 5,098 votes to 2934 for Republican Edward J. Mueller and 2848 for Democrat William W. Murphy. He remained on the judiciary committee, and was appointed to special committees on "Revenue Needs of the State for the Current Biennium" and automobile title laws.

He was re-elected once more in 1940, with 7,812 votes to 4,869 for former Socialist State Representative Otto Kehrein (now running as a Republican) and 4095 for Democrat Elmer Foerster. He was moved to the committee on engrossed bills and to an additional special committee on "Subversive and Un-American Activities of Certain Groups of Employes Engaged in the Manufacture of National Defense Materials". His official biography no longer listed him as an active member of the Socialist Party, but did describe him as a member of the Progressive Party Federation; and he became the floor leader of the Progressive Party in the Assembly.

Biemiller continued to work as a special organizer for the Wisconsin State Federation of Labor through 1942, when he moved to Washington to take a position in the War Production Board. He did not run for re-election, and was succeeded in the Assembly by Democrat Michael F. O'Connell.

=== Congress ===
In 1944 he was elected as a Democrat (Biemiller had abandoned both the Socialist Party and the Progressives by then) to the 79th Congress from the Milwaukee-based Wisconsin's 5th congressional district, unseating Republican incumbent Lewis D. Thill, with 88,606 votes to Thill's 78,834, Socialist former State Representative Edwin Knappe's 4,758, and 2,103 for Independent Progressive Irwin Aaron.

He was defeated for re-election in 1946 by Republican Charles J. Kersten, and went to work as director of political education for the Upholsterers Union. During this period Biemiller joined many other former Socialists and Progressives in helping to found Americans for Democratic Action. He cooperated with Hubert Humphrey in successfully calling for a strong civil rights plank at the 1948 Democratic National Convention, to which he was a delegate and chair of the platform committee which produced the plank.

He defeated Kersten in a 1948 re-match for election to the 81st Congress, but once more lost a bid for re-election in 1950 to Kersten.

== Later career ==
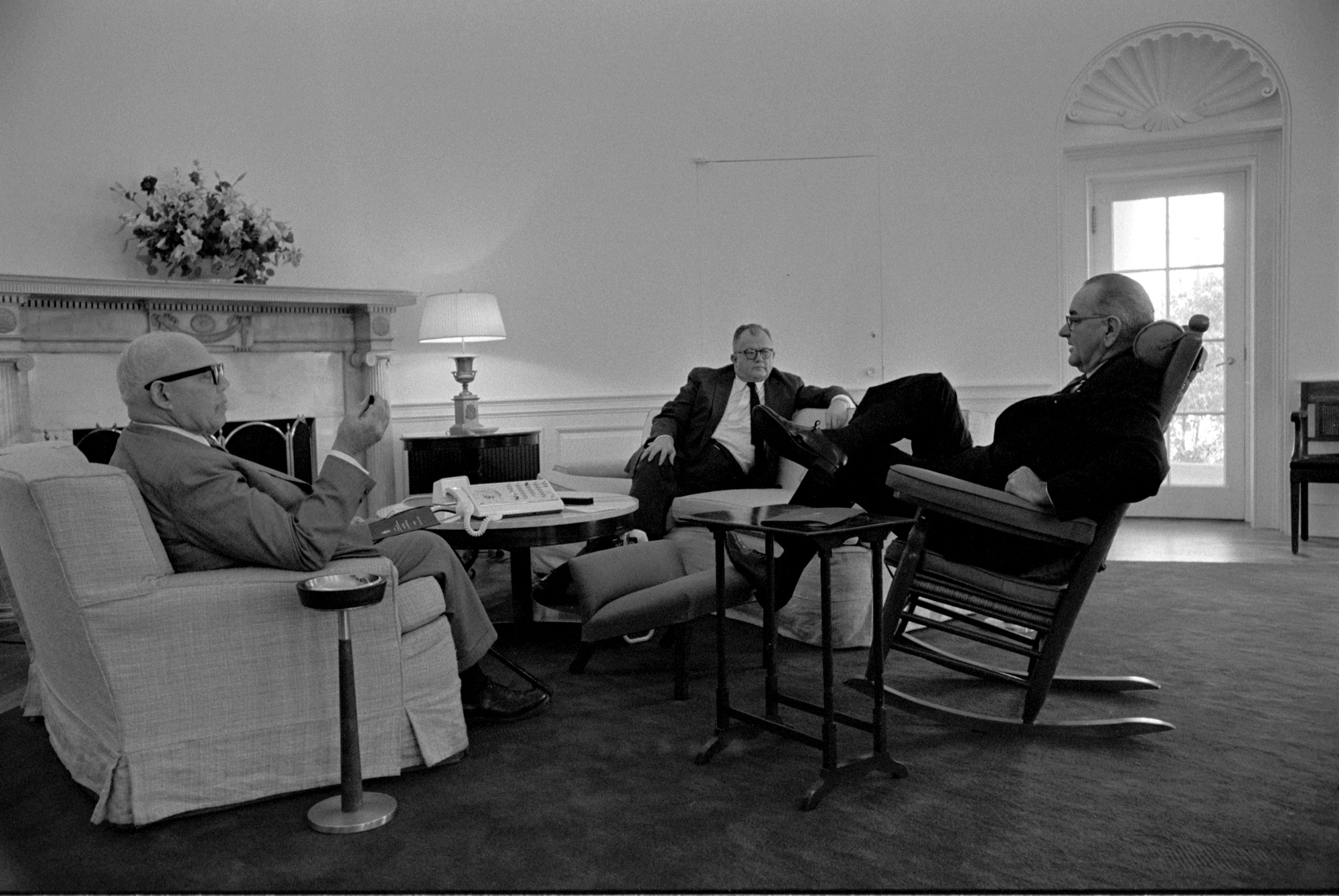
Biemiller (center) in the Oval Office with AFL-CIO President George Meany (left) and President Lyndon B. Johnson, January 17, 1964

After losing his seat in Congress, Biemiller worked through the remainder of the Truman administration at the Department of the Interior. He served from 1953 to 1956 as a legislative representative (lobbyist) for the American Federation of Labor, and then Director of the Department of Legislation (chief lobbyist) of the AFL-CIO from 1956 to 1978. During this period, he played a significant role in passing civil rights, Medicare, and other social and economic legislation, especially during the Kennedy and Johnson administrations.

== Death and legacy ==
Biemiller died in Bethesda, Maryland on April 3, 1982. As a legislator, congressman and labor activist and advocate, he was credited with playing a role in most major social legislation of his era. His papers are housed at the Carl Albert Center at the University of Oklahoma.

== Works ==
- "Speed-Up Hits Manufacture Of Speed Belts". The New Leader. Vol. XI, no. 4. New York. 23 August 1930.
- "Phila. Police Seize Daniel For 'Sedition'". The New Leader. Vol. XII, no. 8. New York. 21 February 1931.
- "Phila. Socialists Name McKeown To Run For Mayor". The New Leader. Vol. XII, no. 5. New York. 1 August 1931.
- "Phila. Fight Opens Monday With Big Rally". The New Leader. Vol. XII, no. 12. New York. 19 September 1931.
- "Phila. Rich Start Drive On Taxation". The New Leader. Vol. XII, no. 20. New York. 14 November 1931.
- "The Philadelphia Jobless". The New Leader. Vol. XII, no. 23. New York. 5 December 1931.
- "Socialists of Phila. Act On Party Policies". The New Leader. Vol. XIII, no. 4. New York. 23 January 1932.
- "250,000 Face Starvation In Philadelphia". The New Leader. Vol. XIII, no. 16. New York. 16 April 1932.
- "Tax-Dodgers Seeking The Recall of Hoan". The New Leader. Vol. XVI, no. 9. New York. 26 August 1933.
- "Hoan Fights for City Housing Project". The New Leader. Vol. XVI, no. 17. New York. 21 October 1933.
- "Socialists Tell Executive of Wis. His Duty". The New Leader. Vol. XVI, no. 18. New York. 28 October 1933.
- "Wisconsin Farm Strike Draws Workers and Farmers Together". The New Leader. Vol. XVI, no. 20. New York. 11 November 1933.
- "Organization Being Pushed in Wisconsin Farm Area". The New Leader. Vol. XVI, no. 23. New York. 2 December 1933.
- "Milwaukee Stirred by Plettl; Is Given Official Welcome". The New Leader. Vol. XVI, no. 25. New York. 16 December 1933.
- "Wisconsin Farmers Flock to the Socialist Party". The New Leader. Vol. XVI, no. 26. New York. 23 December 1933.
- "Shoe Workers of Wisconsin Cities Strike". The New Leader. Vol. XVII, no. 6. New York. 10 February 1934.
- "Milwaukee to Hold Biggest Bazaar". The New Leader. Vol. XVII, no. 7. New York. 17 February 1934.
- "America at..." The New Leader. Vol. XVII, no. 11. New York. 17 March 1934.
- "Hoan Backs Demands of 20,000 Demonstrators in Milwaukee". The New Leader. Vol. XVII, no. 16. New York. 21 April 1934.
- "The Proudest Chapter In Socialist History". The New Leader. Vol. XVII, no. 17. New York. 28 April 1934.
- "Dan Hoan Leads Colorful May Day Demonstration". The New Leader. Vol. XVII, no. 19. New York. 12 May 1934.
- "The LaFollettes Reject Class Party Ideas". The New Leader. Vol. XVII, no. 21. New York. 26 May 1934.
- "Badger Farmers Line Up for Socialism". The New Leader. Vol. XVII, no. 24. New York. 16 June 1934.
- "Utility Trust Forced to Give In As Milwaukee Rallies to Back Strikers". The New Leader. Vol. XVII, no. 27. New York. 7 July 1934.
- "Socialist Bill Reported Out In Wisconsin". The New Leader. Vol. XVIII, no. 18. New York. 4 May 1935.
- "Biemiller Denies Charges By Lefkowitz on Teachers". The New Leader. Vol. XVIII, no. 37. New York. 14 September 1935.
- "Remove Cause of Strikes!". The New Leader. Vol. XXIX, no. 26. New York. 29 June 1946.
- "The Growing Need for Health Insurance". The New Leader. Vol. XXX, no. 15. New York. 12 April 1947.

U.S. House of Representatives
Preceded by Howard J. McMurray	Member of the U.S. House of Representatives from Wisconsin's 5th congressional district January 3, 1945 – January 3, 1947	Succeeded by Charles J. Kersten
Preceded by Charles J. Kersten	Member of the U.S. House of Representatives from Wisconsin's 5th congressional district January 3, 1949 – January 3, 1951	Succeeded by Charles J. Kersten
