= William Coleman (politician) =

American politician

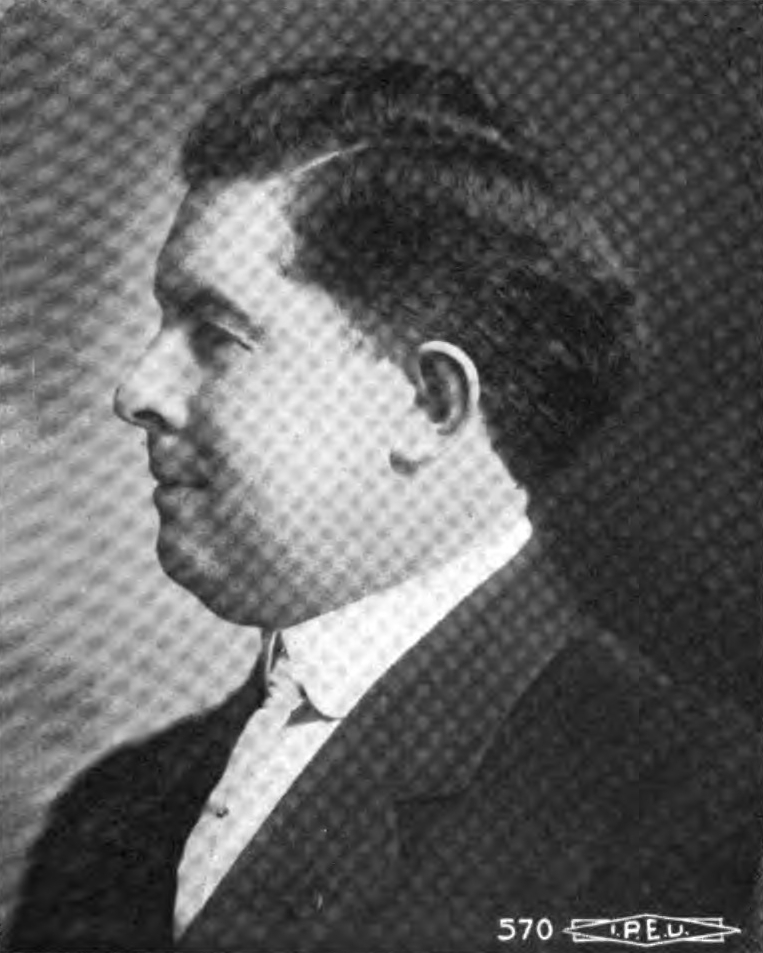
- Coleman c. 1924

Member of the Wisconsin State Assembly from the Milwaukee 20th district
- In office January 5, 1925 – January 7, 1929
- Preceded by: Albert F. Woller
- Succeeded by: Norman R. Klug

Member of the Milwaukee Common Council
- In office April 19, 1910 – August 28, 1933

Personal details
- Born: July 6, 1878 Sioux City, Iowa, U.S.
- Died: August 28, 1933 (aged 55) Milwaukee, Wisconsin, U.S.
- Party: Socialist
- Spouse: Magdalena
- Children: John
- Profession: House painter, trade union activist

William C. Coleman (July 6, 1878 – August 28, 1933) was a house painter and trade union activist from Milwaukee, Wisconsin, who served two terms as a Socialist member of the Wisconsin State Assembly.

== Background ==
Coleman was born July 6, 1878, on a farm at Sioux City, Iowa, where his parents (father from Theresa in Dodge County; mother from Byron in Fond du Lac County) had settled in 1877. During the year his parents returned to Wisconsin, due to a grasshopper plague and Indian disturbances, settling on a farm in Fond du Lac County, where he was educated in the public schools. He moved to Milwaukee in 1899, and became a house painter by trade, and an active member of the Brotherhood of Painters, Decorators and Paperhangers Union of America. He worked as a union organizer for the Painters' Union, the Milwaukee Federated Trades Council and the Wisconsin State Federation of Labor, and rose to be a member of the executive boards of the Council and the Federation.

== Politics ==
In 1908, Coleman came within nine votes of unseating incumbent Republican State Representative Herman Georgi. In 1910, he was elected to the Milwaukee Common Council. He was the Socialist candidate for governor in 1920, coming in third in a four-way race and receiving 71,104 votes, the highest vote ever cast for a Socialist candidate for that office to that date.

By 1924, Coleman was still an alderman-at-large on the Milwaukee Common Council, and was serving as state secretary and organizer of the Socialist Party of Wisconsin. That year, he was elected to the State Assembly, succeeding fellow Socialist Albert F. Woller in the Twentieth Milwaukee County Assembly district (the 20th ward of the City of Milwaukee), defeating former State Representative Republican Charles Meising (whom Woller had unseated in 1922), 4,232 to 3,492. He was assigned to the standing committee on labor.

In 1926, Coleman was re-elected with 3327 votes to 2679 for Meising and 2763 for Democrat Gustin Schwarn.

Coleman did not run for re-election in 1928, and was succeeded by Republican Norman R. Klug. Coleman was a Wisconsin delegate at the 1932 Socialist National Convention, which was held in Milwaukee.

Coleman died in Milwaukee on August 28, 1933.
