= Albert F. Woller =

American politician (1886–1944)

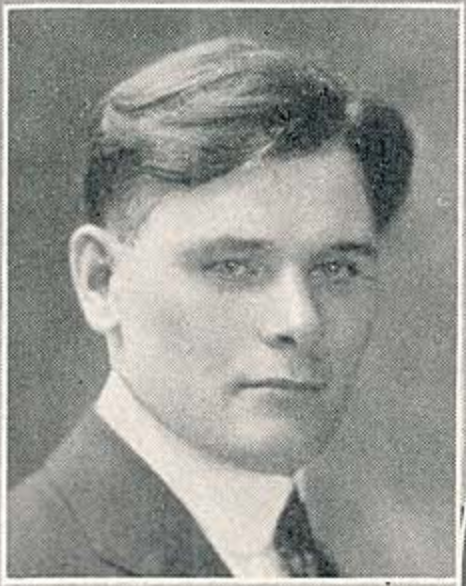

Member of the Wisconsin State Assembly
- In office January 3, 1927 – January 5, 1931
- Preceded by: Frank J. Weber
- Succeeded by: George Hampel
- Constituency: Milwaukee 3rd district
- In office January 1, 1923 – January 5, 1925
- Preceded by: District established
- Succeeded by: William Coleman
- Constituency: Milwaukee 20th district

Personal details
- Born: December 12, 1886 Pomerania, German Empire
- Died: July 27, 1944 (aged 57) Milwaukee, Wisconsin, U.S.
- Resting place: Valhalla Memorial Park, Milwaukee
- Party: Socialist
- Spouse: Marie (died 1931)
- Occupation: Machinist

Albert Frank Woller (December 12, 1886 – July 27, 1944) was a German American immigrant, machinist, auto mechanic, and Socialist politician from Milwaukee, Wisconsin. He served three terms as a member of the Wisconsin State Assembly (1923, 1927, 1929), representing the northwest corner of the city of Milwaukee.

== Background ==
Woller was born in Germany December 12, 1886, and came to the United States with his parents in 1892. He received a public school education at Marengo, Illinois, became a machinist and eventually came to work in auto repair for the Milwaukee Western Fuel Company.

== Public office ==
He had been a member of the Socialist Party for fifteen years, but had never held public office before being elected to the Assembly in November, 1922, receiving 3,246 votes to 2,049 for Republican incumbent Charles Meising. He was assigned to the standing committees on transportation and third reading.

Woller did not run for office in 1924, being succeeded by fellow Socialist William Coleman. In 1926, he had moved to the neighboring 3rd Milwaukee County Assembly district (25th ward of the City) and was elected to the Assembly without opposition (one of three Socialists to run unopposed in the 1926 election). He moved to the Committee on State Affairs. He was narrowly re-elected in 1928, with 2980 votes to 2869 for Republican Arthur Bowers and 1684 for Democrat Timothy Considine.

Woller did not run for re-election in 1930; he was succeeded by fellow Socialist George Hampel.

== After the legislature ==
His wife, also a native of Germany, died at the age of 45 on August 27, 1931, after an illness of two years.

Wisconsin State Assembly
District created by 1921 Wisc. Act 470	Member of the Wisconsin State Assembly from the Milwaukee 20th district January 1, 1923 – January 5, 1925	Succeeded by William Coleman
Preceded by Frank J. Weber	Member of the Wisconsin State Assembly from the Milwaukee 3rd district January 3, 1927 – January 5, 1931	Succeeded by George Hampel
