= La Folletteism =

US political ideology from Wisconsin

La Folletteism (or La Follettism) is a political Ideology and movement within the United States of America which originated in and is associated with Wisconsin.

== History ==
In the 1930s, the La Follette faction of the Republican Party of Wisconsin separated and formed the Wisconsin Progressive Party led by Philip F. La Follette and Robert M. La Follette Jr. After the 1934 State elections, the Wisconsin progressive party became dominant in the state and many of its members went on to form the Farmer-Labor Progressive Federation as a faction within the Wisconsin Progressive Party.

The Wisconsin progressives often informally aligned themselves with the national New Deal of Franklin D. Roosevelt. During the late 1930s, it became difficult to place Philip's policies on whether they were politically to the left or to the right of the national New Deal with Philip being accused of authoritarianism, fascism and demagoguery. This accumulated with the Wisconsin Progressives formation of the National Progressives of America (NPA) and the defeat of the Progressives in the 1938 elections.

With the formation of the NPA Philip stated that "This party, has sprung up from the rank and file of liberals in many states. It is not a ‘popular front' movement and we will not accept disgruntled groups. It is a righteous crusade to unite America and win a lost heritage. It blazes a new trail which avoids old fashioned capitalism, socialism, fascism and communism.”

The NPA wanted to unite the several third parties in the United States that had become dominant throughout the 1930s in their respective states. With local NPA organizations being formed throughout the United States. Officials of the Minnesota Farmer-Labor Party and the Nonpartisan League of North Dakota "could see no immediate possibility of a coalition." Viewing the NPA as more oriented towards the political Interests of farmers in which they viewed would "largely make up" the NPA. The New York Times described the NPA as "largely rural and conservative, with an eye to the great farm vote." During 1938, the Iowa Farmer-Labor Party became the first state organization to announce its support for the NPA. In California the Progressive Commonwealth Federation (PCF) approved of plans for the NPA set out by Philip, asking to be recognized as the California "division" of the NPA, leading to the California Progressive Party to send a pledge of cooperation with Philip.

Robert Jr. helped found the America First Committee in 1940 to oppose Roosevelt's foreign policy and denounce risk of U.S. entry into World War II. Philip found himself working alongside figures such as Charles Lindbergh, which led some to assume he had shifted towards more conservative politics.

Some Progressive leaders such as Evjue began pushing for greater affiliation with the Democratic Party. By the early 1940s, Amlie led an exodus of liberals and left-winger members of the Wisconsin Progressive Party in joining with the Democratic Party of Wisconsin with Philip viewing the party switchers as traitors. Orland Steen Loomis was the last Progressive to be elected Governor of Wisconsin, in the 1942 election. He died, however, before his inauguration as governor. By 1946, the Wisconsin Progressive Party had all but collapsed, barely qualifying for major party status after the 1944 elections. Over the years, the party became factionalized between the support of a rural electorate that was in the middle of ideologically shifting from progressivism to conservatism and the urban left-wing. While Philip had desired for the party to continue on, after being advised to stay out of the 1946 convention, the Party voted to dissolve itself, voting 284 to 131 to rejoin the Republican Party of Wisconsin.

== See also ==
- McCarthyism
