= Ronald Schneider =

Ronald Schneider may refer to:

- Ronnie Schneider, music business manager
- Ronald Schneider (historian), scholar of Latin America
- Ronald Schneider (politician), mayor of Barendrecht, Netherlands, since 2023

== See also ==
- Ronnie Schneider (tennis), American tennis player
- Roy Schneider, Virgin Islander politician and physician
