= Operation Washtub (Nicaragua) =

Coordinates: 38°57′06″N 77°08′48″W

Operation WASHTUB was a covert operation organized by the United States Central Intelligence Agency to plant a phony Soviet arms cache in Nicaragua. It was a part of the CIA's effort to portray the administration of Guatemalan President Jacobo Árbenz as having ties to the Soviet Union, prior to the CIA sponsored 1954 Guatemalan coup d'état which overthrew Árbenz later the same year. On 19 February 1954, the CIA, working through the Guardia Nacional de Nicaragua, planted a cache of Soviet-made arms on the Nicaraguan coast near the fishing village of Masachapa to be "discovered" weeks later by Rafael Lola, a lieutenant in the Nicaraguan army, and fishermen in the pay of Nicaraguan president Anastasio Somoza García. The CIA also wished to dispose of the weapons, which were to have been used by Carlos Castillo Armas, and were therefore incriminating to the CIA. On May 7, 1954, President Somoza told reporters at a press conference that a Soviet submarine had been photographed, but that no prints or negatives were available. The story presented to the press was embroidered with the involvement of Guatemalan assassination squads. Somoza was supposed to convince the public that the arms had been intended for Guatemala. The press and the public were skeptical and the story did not get much press. However, the story became part of the Nicaragua local legends until the 1979 revolution.

The operation received attention again during the attempts by the U.S. government to exploit the products of Operation PBHistory, the CIA effort to gather intelligence from documents left in Guatemala after the 1954 coup by the government and the communist party. Anti-Communist members of the US Congress, especially Charles J. Kersten and Patrick J. Hillings of the Kersten Committee, began to use PBHistory documents in their reports, provided by the CIA to forestall the possibility that members of Congress, officially ignorant of the CIA's role in the Guatemalan coup, would expose other CIA projects. A subcommittee headed by Hillings produced a final report. In addition to stating without evidence that the Guatemalan government had been acting under orders from the Soviet Union, this report also claimed that Soviet weapons had been brought covertly to Guatemala by submarine. This unintentionally drew attention to Operation WASHTUB.

== Sources ==
- Cullather, Nick (2006) [1999]. Secret History: The CIA's Classified Account of Its Operations in Guatemala 1952–1954 (2nd ed.). Stanford, CA: Stanford University Press. ISBN 978-0-804-75467-5.
- De La Pedraja, René (2013). Wars of Latin America, 1948-1982. McFarland. ISBN 9781476602936.
- Gleijeses, Piero (1992). Shattered Hope: The Guatemalan Revolution and the United States, 1944–1954. Princeton, NJ: Princeton University Press. ISBN 978-0-691-07817-5.
- Holland, Max (2004). "Operation PBHISTORY: The Aftermath of SUCCESS". International Journal of Intelligence and CounterIntelligence. 17 (2): 300–332. doi:10.1080/08850600490274935. S2CID 153570470.
