= David Sigman =

American politician (1905–1987)

David Sigman (1905 – February 1, 1987) was an American trade union staff member from Two Rivers, Wisconsin who served three terms as a Republican, then a Progressive member of the Wisconsin State Assembly from the 2nd Manitowoc County district.

== Background ==
Born in 1905 in Brest-Litovsk, Poland, Sigman was the youngest of six children born in Poland before his family immigrated to the United States. Sigman graduated from Two Rivers High School and the University of Wisconsin. When elected in 1930, he had been a resident of Two Rivers for 24 years.

== Public office ==
He was still in law school when first elected to the Assembly in 1930 from the 2nd District (the Towns of Cato, Cooperstown, Eaton, Franklin, Gibson, Kossuth, Maple Grove, Mishicot, Rockland, Schleswig, Two Creeks, and Two Rivers; Villages of Reedsville and Valders; and the Cities of Kiel and Two Rivers) as a self-described "Progressive Republican", with a plurality over three challengers in the Republican primary. He won the general election with 3,458 votes to 2,911 for Democrat Henry Goedjen. Sigman was assigned to the standing committees on elections and engrossed bills, and to a special joint committee for investigation of the Memorial Union.

In 1932, Sigman defeated two challengers in the Republican primary, only to go down to defeat in the 1932 landslide Democratic victory, being unseated by Democrat Raymond J. Scheuer. In 1934, Sigman (now working as a union organizer for the Wisconsin State Federation of Labor, part of a WSFL policy of offering employment to key pro-labor legislators to supplement the low legislative salaries) reclaimed his seat, first by winning a three-way Progressive Party primary, then by defeating Democratic and Republican nominees (Scheur was not a candidate for re-election) in the general election. He was re-elected in 1936, after facing a challenge from one Everett La Fond or Lafond first in the Progressive primary, then again as an "Independent Progressive" in the general election (along with Democratic and Republican challengers).

In 1938, Sigman ran for the 1st State Senate District, losing in the primary.

== After the legislature ==
In 1939, as part of a campaign against perceived supporters of Henry Ohl in the WSFL, Sigman lost his seat on the WSFL executive board, one he had been elected to in 1937 as recognition of his key role in defending labor interests in the just-ended legislative session.

=== Senior citizen activism ===
Sigman served as secretary for the Allied Council of Senior Citizens of Wisconsin (a senior citizens' rights organization) in November 1964, speaking to the press at the organization's first meeting in Milwaukee. Among the council's other leaders was former Socialist assemblyman John Polakowski; at one point he was their president.
