= Operation Washtub =

Operation Washtub may refer to:

- Operation Washtub (Nicaragua), a covert CIA operation in Nicaragua in the 1950s
- Operation Washtub (United States), a covert Air Force and FBI operation in Alaska in the 1950s
