= Frank J. Weber =

American politician, union organizer (1849–1943)

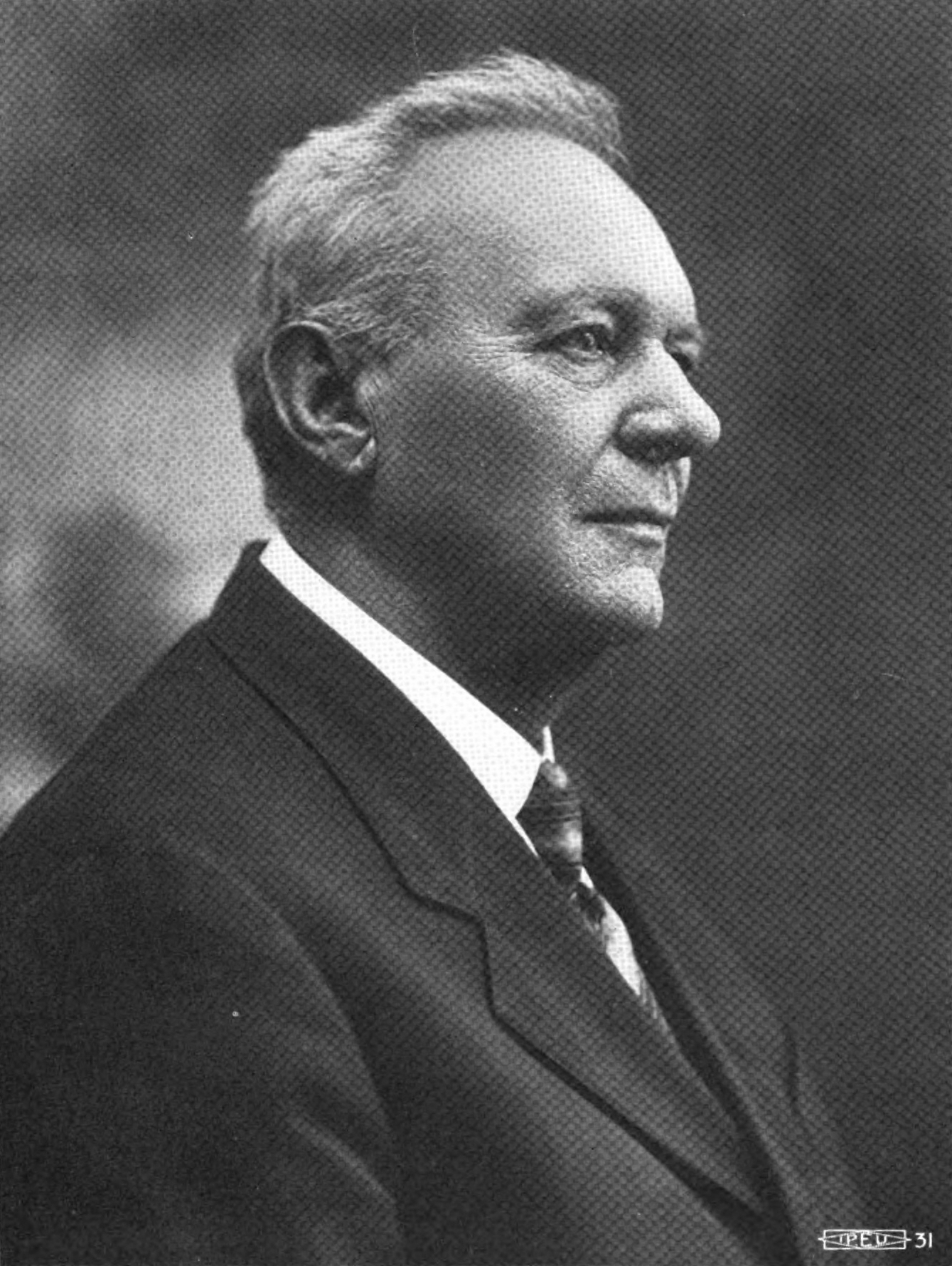
- Weber c. 1923

General Organizer of the Wisconsin State Federation of Labor
- In office June 6, 1893 – July 21, 1917
- Preceded by: Office established
- Succeeded by: Henry Ohl Jr.

Member of the Wisconsin State Assembly
- In office January 1, 1923 – January 3, 1927
- Constituency: Milwaukee 3rd
- In office January 4, 1915 – January 1, 1917
- Constituency: Milwaukee 10th
- In office January 7, 1907 – January 6, 1913
- Constituency: Milwaukee 16th

Personal details
- Born: August 7, 1849 Milwaukee, Wisconsin, U.S.
- Died: February 4, 1943 (aged 93) Milwaukee, Wisconsin, U.S.
- Party: Socialist
- Occupation: Seaman, carpenter, labor leader, politician

Frank J. Weber (August 7, 1849 – February 4, 1943) was a seaman, carpenter and union organizer from Milwaukee who served as the General Organizer of the Wisconsin State Federation of Labor from 1893 to 1917, as well as five non-consecutive terms as a Socialist member of the Wisconsin State Assembly between 1907 and 1926.

== Background ==
Weber was born in the city of Milwaukee on August 7, 1849. In 1852 his family moved to Grafton in Ozaukee County, and he attended public school in Ulao. After completing apprenticeship, Weber became an able seaman and sailed on Great Lakes and Atlantic Ocean merchant ships (according to his 1906 official biography, "in which capacity he visited all the most important seaports of the world").

== Labor movement ==
He joined the Lake Seamen's Union in 1868, and was active in the Knights of Labor after 1869. In 1887 he helped organize the Milwaukee Federated Trades Council, becoming its secretary in 1902: an office he would hold until his retirement in January 1934. In 1888 Weber organized ship cargo handlers into what became the International Longshoremen's Association, and in the same year organized a Carpenters' Union in Milwaukee. In 1893 Weber was chosen the first president of the Wisconsin State Federation of Labor. As of 1894 he refused the title of President, preferring to be General Organizer; he was to hold that office until 1917. Weber fought to align the State Federation of Labor with the goals and principles of the Social Democratic Party (as it was long known in Wisconsin).

As of 1906 he boasted that he had been a member of a labor organization for 40 years, and was also one of the General Organizers of the American Federation of Labor.

== Political office and service ==
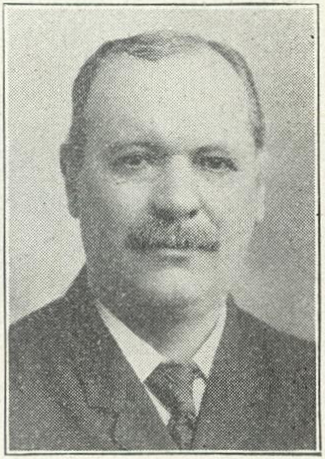
Weber's official State Assembly portrait, 1907

In 1904 Weber was a Socialist candidate for Presidential elector from Milwaukee.

In 1906 he was elected to the Assembly from the 16th Milwaukee County district (the 20th ward of the City of Milwaukee), succeeding fellow Socialist August W. Strehlow. Weber won with 1,580 votes to 1,080 for Republican Edward Groeling. In 1908 he was re-elected, with 1,799 votes against to 1,380 for Republican Louis Goulki and 825 for Democrat Charles Newser. Weber was assigned to the standing committee on Manufactures and Labor.

In the Assembly Weber worked for the passage of laws establishing the Wisconsin Industrial Commission (with Charles H. Crownhart and John R. Commons he wrote the industrial commission law in 1911), workmen's compensation, the state system of technical education, and other statutes favorable to the interests of the working class.

In 1926 (at which time he was State Chairman of the Socialist Party of Wisconsin), rather than run for re-election to the Assembly, he opted to challenge incumbent State Senator Bernhard Gettelman. He lost the election to Gettelman, with 8,074 votes to 10,589 for the incumbent.

== After the Assembly ==
As he had always done when not in the legislature himself, he continued to spend time during the session at Madison lobbying for labor. Weber died in Milwaukee on February 4, 1943, known as "the grand old man of Wisconsin labor."
