= National Progressives of America =

- Emblem of the National Progressives of America
- Abbreviation: NPA
- Leader: Philip La Follette; Ralph Immell
- Founded: April 28, 1938, Madison, Wisconsin
- Dissolved: 1946
- Ideology: La Folletteism; Progressivism; Conservatism; Isolationism
- Political position: Syncretic
- Regional affiliation: Wisconsin Progressive Party
- Colors: red, white, and blue

Party flag

The National Progressives of America (NPA) also referred to as the National Progressives was a Progressive political party in the United States established in April 1938. The organization was closely associated with the personality and agenda of Wisconsin governor Philip La Follette and declined greatly as a national organization when his bid for re-election was defeated in November of that year.

Although continuing to operate from its Madison, Wisconsin, headquarters into the early 1940s, the NPA failed to gain significant support around the country and was broadly criticized for lack of programmatic specifics and for its perceived use of fascist-inspired iconography.

== History ==
=== Background ===
The Wisconsin Progressive Party emerged from the Republican Party of Wisconsin and was established in 1934 by Philip La Follette and Robert La Follette Jr.—the sons of Robert M. "Fighting Bob" La Follette, who ran for President of the United States as a Progressive candidate during the 1924 presidential election.

The new Progressive Party was successful in subsequent elections and the party surpassed the Democratic Party of Wisconsin, relegating the Democrats once again to effective third party status in the state. The National Progressives of America was an attempt to take this state-level success and replicate it on the national stage.

First elected governor of Wisconsin in the fall of 1930 as a Republican, Philip La Follette won re-election in 1934 on the ticket of the Wisconsin Progressive Party and looked askance at both of the "old parties" as inadequate to meet the extraordinary economic situation of the Great Depression. While he was generally supportive of the New Deal legislation of President Franklin D. Roosevelt throughout the middle years of the 1930s, he became disillusioned after the election of 1936, with the large scale dismissal of Works Progress Administration personnel in 1937 marking a particular tipping point in his perspective.

Beginning in the spring of 1937, La Follette began to look around the country for prospective allies in construction of a new political party to challenge the hegemony of the Democrats and Republicans, both of which were constrained by conservative elements. At a May 1937 celebration of the third anniversary of the Wisconsin Progressive Party, La Follette made a public call for liberals around the country to cooperate with the Wisconsin Progressives in establishing a new third party.

"The time is close at hand for the formation of a new political realignment in the nation which will defeat the reactionary forces in the nation just as the Progressive Party has defeated the reactionary forces in Wisconsin," he declared.

He spent the following summer networking with like-minded political figures around the country, making the acquaintance of Raymond Haight, leader of the California Progressive Party and recipient of more than 300,000 votes in the 1934 California gubernatorial election, as well as Mayor Fiorello La Guardia of New York City and various leaders of the Midwestern farmer-labor movement.

=== Formation ===
Governor Phil La Follette announces formation of the National Progressives of America, April 28, 1938.

The National Progressives of America was established on April 28, 1938, at a rally in Madison, Wisconsin, convened and addressed by Governor La Follette. The organization was inseparably bound with the personality of the charismatic governor—no figure of national prominence sat with him on the platform, with assistant secretary of state Adolf Berle and Minnesota budget director Paul Rasmussen, acting as a representative of Governor Elmer A. Benson, seated as the top dignitaries in attendance to the side of the platform. Berle, who appeared as the representative of New York City mayor Fiorello La Guardia, received the advance permission of President Roosevelt to attend the gathering.

In preparation for a grand political event, the University of Wisconsin stock pavilion was decorated in red, white, and blue, with a military band playing marching music and other patriotic songs and players for the Wisconsin Badgers football team acting as ushers. An overflow crowd estimated at 7,500 people assembled to hear the Governor's 90 minute speech at the pavilion, with thousands milling outside listening to loudspeakers after all the seats in the 3,500 seat hall were taken. Wisconsin circuit court judge Alvin C. Reis had been tasked with leading the meeting as its chairman.

At the front, under the rostrum, were three long tables reserved for members of the press. Some 75 reporters were in attendance, including representatives of newspapers in Washington, DC, New York, and Chicago, as well as dozens of photojournalists. In addition, hot klieg lights were in place for newsreel cameramen — an arrangement which left the assembled photographers up front dripping with sweat by the end of the evening.

Beginning his speech slowly and without gestures, Governor La Follette rose to what one journalist described as an "evangelical fervor," pointing his forefinger and theatrically stretching his arms wide. Behind him was a gigantic banner with the emblem of the new party—rendered as a blue cross on a white background, inside a red circle, "typifying the voter's mark on the ballot."

Text of a leaflet enumerating principles of the new party distributed to those attending the April 28, 1938, foundation meeting in Madison.

La Follette struck "a nationalistic note in the sense that he was primarily, and almost exclusively concerned with America. The country remained mired in an economic depression that had lasted nearly a decade, La Follette said, with liberty itself endangered by disrupted production and a low standard of living for a major part of the country. The nation had become mired in attempt to maintain prices, profits, and wages by combating what La Follette considered the mythical notion of "overproduction" by restricting agricultural and industrial output—all the while millions of Americans remained without adequate food, shelter, or clothing.

Both the Republican and Democratic parties were to blame for the decade of malaise, La Follette declared, with the nation waiting hopelessly for "prosperity which was just around the corner" for four years under Herbert Hoover before six unsatisfactory years of the Roosevelt administration that only "transferred red ink from the books of private enterprise to the bookkeeping of our local, state, and national government." This attempt to maintain living standards through private and public borrowing had been a costly and futile exercise, albeit "well-meant," La Follette asserted.

La Follette sought a return to the policy of the "old days" in which

"our country did not pay people to remain idle or to do unproductive work. We gave everyone an opportunity to do wealth-creating work. If they did not take that offer, they could sink or swim as they pleased. Today we have idle resources, and also idle people.... Again we must provide every able-bodied man and woman with a real opportunity for wealth-creating work at decent hours and at decent pay. Then, let us return to the principle that he who is able and does not work—well, then, at least he shall not live at the expense of his neighbor."

With enthusiasm among the attendees duly escalated, La Follette unveiled a set of principles for the new National Progressives of America (NPA).

The organization's six principles were very general in tone, affirming the freedoms of religion, press, and assembly and adding the right of Americans "to have effective voice in...political and economic life"; the right of citizens to earn a living through useful work; the right of youth to adequately funded public education; the right of the elderly to a "self-respecting system of old-age pensions"; the right of workers to organize and collectively bargain; and a vague right of all to live under a government that was both strong and just.

=== Response ===
Reaction to the formation of the new national political party was tepid, with various national liberal figures, allies of Roosevelt, organized labor, and even allies of La Follette declining to join the new party.

Minnesota Farmer–Labor Senator Ernest Lundeen said of the new organization, "I am very glad to see my third or first or any other new party formed. I predict that all such parties which we may form will eventually drift into a great national labor party as it did in England." For his own part, however, Lunden said, "we in Minnesota like the name farmer–labor. I do not think we shall want to change the name of our party or merge in this new party, but I think we shall want to cooperate with it."

Officials of the Minnesota Farmer-Laborites and the Nonpartisan League of North Dakota "could see no immediate possibility of a coalition." Viewing the NPA as more oriented towards the political Interests of farmers in which they viewed would "largely make up" the NPA.

Others, like liberal Democratic U.S. Senator Sherman Minton of Indiana, saw the new party as a potential threat to the unity of liberal forces which would result in the election of reactionaries. Independent Senator George W. Norris of Nebraska, took a wait-and-see approach, indicating that such a national organization of progressive people would be a good thing, while offering that a third party campaign would split liberal forces, resulting in election of a right wing president. "I do not know whether it is Phil's intent to have a presidential ticket in 1940," Norris said.

Additionally, Mayor La Guardia and John L. Lewis, then president of the Congress of Industrial Organizations (CIO), refused to associate themselves with the NPA. Robert Jr. himself seemed skeptical of his brother's efforts, as he gave half-hearted statements of support for the party.

Journalist Walter Lippmann was skeptical of La Follette's efforts, believing that a national coalition of liberals would need the support of both the American Federation of Labor and the CIO. He believed that such support would be unlikely due to La Follette's leadership and due to his formation of the NPA as separate from the farmer-labor movement. This criticism was similar to those expressed by members of Roosevelt's cabinet, such as Harold L. Ickes, who felt La Follette was trying to seize the moment and be the center of attention. Heywood Broun, another prominent journalist, criticized the event for its attempts at appealing to the middle class, claiming that "the most formidable fascist movement which has yet arisen in America is being nurtured in Madison, Wisconsin by Phil La Follette".

The seven Wisconsin Progressive members of the United States House of Representatives appeared with the NPA's Emblem. With Robert Jr. going on to state "I shall do everything I can to contribute to the development of the new party. I shall seize every opportunity that is presented to advance this new movement."

The party's official logo, using the national colors of red-white-and-blue and ostensibly depicting a marked ballot space, appeared to some as the offspring of a Confederate battle flag and the logo of Nazi Germany. It was often described as a "mutilated swastika" as well as a "circumcised swastika" by eastern liberals.

The media offered criticism of the party platform, with many media outlets calling it vague and lacking in definite proposals, with the party itself described as having fascist overtones.

=== Development and defeat ===
After its formation, La Follette traveled the country in an attempt to recruit allies to his cause and build up the party. In response, various progressive and liberal figures declined to affiliate and expressed disinterest in the party.

La Follette traveled to Iowa to help establish the NPA within the state and in cooperation with the Progressive League of Iowa and the Farmer-Labor Party of Iowa a rally was held with around 2,000 attendees. Before the rally was held he announced that the NPA would have Canadettes for congress in ten states for the 1938 elections. He later traveled to a conference with various Farmer-Labor leaders in attendance, among the attendees were leaders of the Farmer-Labor Party of Minnesota.

The NPA established tickets in Iowa and Idaho and organized alliances with California, Oregon, North Dakota organizations, and opened regional headquarters in Chicago with plans to expanded into Texas, New York, and California.

While La Follette was absent from Wisconsin, the state progressive party began to collapse, as factionalism and intraparty bickering began to take hold. Additionally, many of his old allies, such as Paul Alfonsi, felt sidelined by La Follette, as many of them did not agree with the formation of the NPA. Due to his prolonged absences, La Follette appointed Ralph Immell as the National Progressive's National Director, Immell would go on to state:

"The next decade holds the most critical chapter of American history. it will unfold the story of the eclipse of the two major political parties in America in the struggle of our people to beat off the unwanted European doctrines of Communism, Fascism, and Nazism, and the unworkable European doctrine of pure socialism. We all should be too concerned with the insecurity and want amid plenty to smugly stand by and not play what part we can in the drive of the National Progressives of America to make America once again the land of opportunity and security for every child and man."

The Wisconsin gubernatorial election of 1938, with Philip La Follette running for a fourth term of office, was the first test of the NPA at the ballot box. It resulted in the election of conservative Julius P. Heil in a sweeping victory cast as a massive repudiation of La Follette and the progressive movement.

Gubernatorial election before the founding of the NPA (1936)

Gubernatorial election after the founding of the NPA (1938)

Writing in the February 1939 issue of Harper's Magazine, novelist and journalist Elmer Davis declared that "virtually everybody but Phil La Follette believes that this last election finished NPA, at least as an immediate factor in national politics." Davis opined that the landslide against La Follette had been fueled by his "assurance and imperiousness in office," combined with the "outward trappings of his party, no less than his single-handed domination of it" which "reminded some people unjustly, but not without superficial plausibility" of Adolf Hitler.

Another analyst declared that while "in sober retrospect, many people who voted against Phil because of the NPA believe the charge he is 'tainted with fascism' is absurd," nevertheless the timing of the 1938 election on the heels of the Munich crisis created jitters among the electorate which provided fertile ground for an opposition which made note that "the NPA symbol looked like a mutilated swastika."

After turning over the keys to the governor's mansion in January 1939, former governor Philip La Follette went on an extended trip to Europe, leaving his fledgling personality-centered third party in America rudderless.

In March 1939 the Manitowoc Herald-Times declared that while the Progressive Party movement in Wisconsin had been defeated, it was not destroyed in the November 1938 election. However, the fate of the NPA, La Follette's national third party, had been more or less sealed, the editorialist declared: "[La Follette] might as well forget about the NPA unless a major miracle sends all liberal groups throughout the country scurrying for a haven. It is more dead now than it was last November, if that is possible."

=== Wartime years ===
As Europe descended into World War II, La Follette remained undaunted, continuing to attempt to build the National Progressives of America organization. While continuing to maintain headquarters in Madison, he attempted to temper expectations for the organization, indicating in a December 1939 interview that it was not designed to be a third party itself, but rather an educational agency intended to unite disparate liberal political groups from around the country and the medium through which a new political organization would emerge. La Follette maintained an optimistic face, acknowledging that the emergence of a proper third party might take years.

The lure of coming elections proved strong, however, and in January 1940 he announced to the media that the NPA planned to "try to elect some persons to congress this year." While declaring that the NPA would run tickets in several states, he declined to provide specifics, however.

On June 20, 1940, La Follette turned his eye to foreign policy in a radio speech broadcast to the nation. In this address, La Follette called for America to "forge a ring of steel around the Western hemisphere to make it safe from foreign aggression." He called for a policy of "selective service to defend America" which would "include all according to their fitness" and which would incorporate vital industries as part of the national enterprise.

La Follette charged that leaders of both of the old parties had "continuously given aid and comfort to the appeasers in Europe" rather than by fortifying America by building its own economic institutions. He declared that America must not be entangled by "futile and dangerous gestures that can not save France and Britain" and should resist any attempts of European governments to "bring its unfinished war to the shores of our hemisphere."

As the move was made to isolationism, the La Follette brothers moved to acquire complete ownership and control of The Progressive, a weekly newspaper established by Robert La Follette Sr. as La Follette's Weekly in 1909 and which had from 1928 been published jointly by the La Follette family and the Capital Times newspaper in Madison. Marking the change of control, Morris H. Rubin, publicity director of the NPA, was installed as editor, with Phil La Follette's wife Isabel listed on the masthead as associate editor.

== See also ==
- Wisconsin Progressive Party
- New Deal coalition
