= 1920 Wisconsin gubernatorial election =

- November 2, 1920
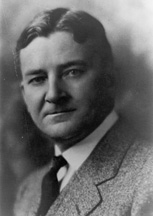

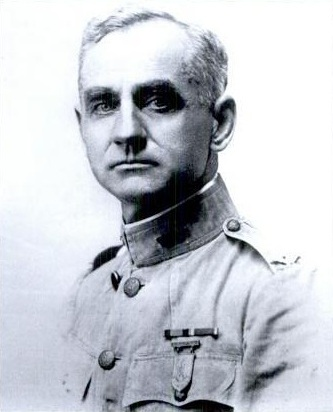

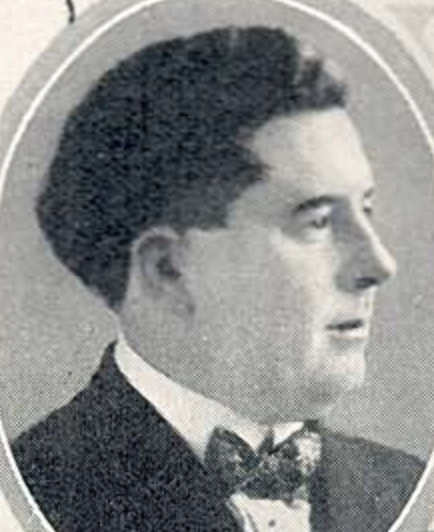
Nominee	John J. Blaine	Robert McCoy	William Coleman
Party	Republican	Democratic	Social-Democratic
Popular vote	366,247	247,746	71,126
Percentage	52.98%	35.84%	10.29%
- County results Blaine: 30–40% 40–50% 50–60% 60–70% 70–80% McCoy: 40–50% 50–60%
Governor before election
Emanuel L. Philipp
Republican
Elected Governor
John J. Blaine
Republican

The 1920 Wisconsin gubernatorial election was held on November 2, 1920. Primary elections were held on September 7, 1920.

Republican candidate John J. Blaine won the election with 52.98% of the vote, winning his first of three terms as Governor of Wisconsin. Blaine defeated Democratic Party candidate Robert McCoy, Social-Democratic candidate William Coleman and Prohibition Party candidate Henry H. Tubbs.

== Republican party ==
=== Candidates ===
==== Nominee ====
- John J. Blaine, incumbent Attorney General of Wisconsin

==== Eliminated in primary ====
- Edward Dithmar, incumbent Lieutenant Governor
- Merlin Hull, incumbent Secretary of State of Wisconsin
- Gilbert E. Seaman, regent of the University of Wisconsin
- James N. Tittemore, unsuccessful candidate for Republican nomination for Governor in 1918
- Roy P. Wilcox, incumbent State Senator, unsuccessful candidate for Republican nomination for Governor in 1918

==== Declined ====
- Joseph D. Beck, former chairman of the Wisconsin Industrial Commission (1915–1917)

==== Results ====
Republican primary results
Party	Candidate	Votes	%
Republican	John J. Blaine	113,001	29.87%
Republican	Roy P. Wilcox	102,199	27.02%
Republican	Gilbert E. Seaman	59,008	15.60%
Republican	Merlin Hull	45,308	11.98%
Republican	Edward F. Dithmar	31,399	8.30%
Republican	James N. Tittemore	27,348	7.23%
Total votes		378,263	100.00%

== Democratic party ==
=== Nominee ===
- Robert Bruce McCoy, general in the National Guard, former Monroe County Court judge and Mayor of Sparta

=== Results ===
Democratic primary results
Party	Candidate	Votes	%
Democratic	Robert B. McCoy	22,435	100.00%
Total votes		22,435	100.00%

== Social-Democratic party ==
=== Nominee ===
- William Coleman, union organizer, unsuccessful candidate for the Wisconsin House of Representatives in 1908

=== Results ===
Social-Democratic primary results
Party	Candidate	Votes	%
Social-Democratic	William Coleman	33,213	100.00%
Total votes		33,213	100.00%

== Prohibition party ==
=== Nominee ===
- Henry H. Tubbs, Prohibition nominee for Wisconsin's 1st congressional district in 1904

=== Results ===
Prohibition primary results
Party	Candidate	Votes	%
Prohibition	Henry H. Tubbs	2,663	100.00%
Total votes		2,663	100.00%

== General election ==
=== Results ===
1920 Wisconsin gubernatorial election
Party	Candidate	Votes	%	±%
Republican	John J. Blaine	366,247	52.98%	+5.99%
Democratic	Robert B. McCoy	247,746	35.84%	+1.89%
Social-Democratic	William Coleman	71,126	10.29%	−7.06%
Prohibition	Henry H. Tubbs	6,047	0.87%	−0.72%
	Scattering	128	0.02%	
Majority		118,501	17.14%	
Total votes		691,294		
Republican hold		Swing	+4.11%	

=== Results by county ===
McCoy was the first Democrat to ever win Rock County. He was also the first Democrat since Nelson Dewey in 1848 to win Walworth County and the first since George W. Peck in 1892 to win Oneida County.

County	John J. Blaine Republican		Robert B. McCoy Democratic		William Coleman Social-Democratic		Henry H. Tubbs Prohibition		Scattering Write-in		Margin		Total votes cast
County	#	%	#	%	#	%	#	%	#	%	#	%	Total votes cast
Adams	1,319	67.75%	574	29.48%	32	1.64%	21	1.08%	1	0.05%	745	38.26%	1,947
Ashland	3,172	56.42%	2,199	39.11%	188	3.34%	62	1.10%	1	0.02%	973	17.31%	5,622
Barron	5,141	64.34%	2,637	33.00%	87	1.09%	121	1.51%	4	0.05%	2,504	31.34%	7,990
Bayfield	2,059	61.78%	1,033	30.99%	193	5.79%	47	1.41%	1	0.03%	1,026	30.78%	3,333
Brown	7,413	51.71%	6,076	42.39%	736	5.13%	109	0.76%	1	0.01%	1,337	9.33%	14,335
Buffalo	2,553	73.13%	801	22.94%	109	3.12%	27	0.77%	1	0.03%	1,752	50.19%	3,491
Burnett	1,937	77.95%	360	14.49%	135	5.43%	52	2.09%	1	0.04%	1,577	63.46%	2,485
Calumet	3,325	70.55%	930	19.73%	423	8.98%	35	0.74%	0	0.00%	2,395	50.82%	4,713
Chippewa	5,171	63.56%	2,794	34.35%	84	1.03%	84	1.03%	2	0.02%	2,377	29.22%	8,135
Clark	4,822	62.11%	2,160	27.82%	668	8.60%	114	1.47%	0	0.00%	2,662	34.29%	7,764
Columbia	5,548	62.74%	3,189	36.06%	57	0.64%	48	0.54%	1	0.01%	2,359	26.68%	8,843
Crawford	2,853	59.15%	1,898	39.35%	24	0.50%	48	1.00%	0	0.00%	955	19.80%	4,823
Dane	18,109	61.89%	10,796	36.90%	153	0.52%	197	0.67%	6	0.02%	7,313	24.99%	29,261
Dodge	8,554	59.27%	4,911	34.03%	887	6.15%	79	0.55%	2	0.01%	3,643	25.24%	14,433
Door	3,001	72.35%	1,054	25.41%	58	1.40%	35	0.84%	0	0.00%	1,947	46.94%	4,148
Douglas	6,285	59.24%	3,709	34.96%	506	4.77%	107	1.01%	2	0.02%	2,576	24.28%	10,609
Dunn	4,049	64.42%	2,054	32.68%	61	0.97%	116	1.85%	5	0.08%	1,995	31.74%	6,285
Eau Claire	5,095	55.03%	3,972	42.90%	75	0.81%	111	1.20%	6	0.06%	1,123	12.13%	9,259
Florence	758	76.18%	203	20.40%	20	2.01%	14	1.41%	0	0.00%	555	55.78%	995
Fond du Lac	9,361	56.72%	6,645	40.27%	374	2.27%	123	0.75%	0	0.00%	2,716	16.46%	16,503
Forest	944	50.83%	868	46.74%	33	1.78%	12	0.65%	0	0.00%	76	4.09%	1,857
Grant	6,996	59.29%	4,613	39.10%	50	0.42%	132	1.12%	8	0.07%	2,383	20.20%	11,799
Green	3,974	62.98%	2,160	34.23%	42	0.67%	132	2.09%	2	0.03%	1,814	28.75%	6,310
Green Lake	2,381	53.45%	1,885	42.31%	152	3.41%	37	0.83%	0	0.00%	496	11.13%	4,455
Iowa	3,767	57.81%	2,610	40.06%	21	0.32%	114	1.75%	4	0.06%	1,157	17.76%	6,516
Iron	1,426	69.83%	486	23.80%	103	5.04%	27	1.32%	0	0.00%	940	46.03%	2,042
Jackson	2,838	68.19%	1,227	29.48%	45	1.08%	44	1.06%	8	0.19%	1,611	38.71%	4,162
Jefferson	6,195	56.32%	4,623	42.03%	93	0.85%	88	0.80%	0	0.00%	1,572	14.29%	10,999
Juneau	3,196	60.70%	1,935	36.75%	85	1.61%	46	0.87%	3	0.06%	1,261	23.95%	5,265
Kenosha	5,450	44.13%	6,227	50.42%	611	4.95%	62	0.50%	0	0.00%	-777	-6.29%	12,350
Kewaunee	2,354	72.72%	807	24.93%	60	1.85%	16	0.49%	0	0.00%	1,547	47.79%	3,237
La Crosse	8,178	60.40%	4,970	36.71%	217	1.60%	164	1.21%	11	0.08%	3,208	23.69%	13,540
Lafayette	3,782	59.03%	2,525	39.41%	19	0.30%	78	1.22%	3	0.05%	1,257	19.62%	6,407
Langlade	2,700	44.66%	3,273	54.13%	55	0.91%	18	0.30%	0	0.00%	-573	-9.48%	6,046
Lincoln	3,085	60.44%	1,603	31.41%	375	7.35%	40	0.78%	1	0.02%	1,482	29.04%	5,104
Manitowoc	6,834	51.97%	3,540	26.92%	2,728	20.75%	48	0.37%	0	0.00%	3,294	25.05%	13,150
Marathon	7,729	45.11%	5,402	31.53%	3,903	22.78%	96	0.56%	4	0.02%	2,327	13.58%	17,134
Marinette	4,795	60.66%	2,564	32.44%	458	5.79%	88	1.11%	0	0.00%	2,231	28.22%	7,905
Marquette	1,808	58.70%	1,221	39.64%	30	0.97%	21	0.68%	0	0.00%	587	19.06%	3,080
Milwaukee	54,594	38.56%	41,958	29.63%	44,418	31.37%	619	0.44%	0	0.00%	10,176 (Note: Blaine's margin over Coleman)	7.19%	141,589
Monroe	5,004	61.46%	2,969	36.47%	70	0.86%	99	1.22%	0	0.00%	2,035	24.99%	8,142
Oconto	3,935	65.19%	1,903	31.53%	157	2.60%	39	0.65%	2	0.03%	2,032	33.66%	6,036
Oneida	1,571	43.42%	1,704	47.10%	315	8.71%	26	0.72%	2	0.06%	-133	-3.68%	3,618
Outagamie	7,691	54.12%	6,246	43.95%	179	1.26%	94	0.66%	0	0.00%	1,445	10.17%	14,210
Ozaukee	3,167	69.09%	1,189	25.94%	210	4.58%	18	0.39%	0	0.00%	1,978	43.15%	4,584
Pepin	1,113	55.32%	843	41.90%	30	1.49%	25	1.24%	1	0.05%	270	13.42%	2,012
Pierce	3,134	60.41%	1,917	36.95%	77	1.48%	58	1.12%	2	0.04%	1,217	23.46%	5,188
Polk	4,146	71.98%	1,386	24.06%	131	2.27%	97	1.68%	0	0.00%	2,760	47.92%	5,760
Portage	4,429	52.22%	3,894	45.91%	109	1.29%	48	0.57%	2	0.02%	535	6.31%	8,482
Price	2,607	65.72%	1,011	25.49%	317	7.99%	32	0.81%	0	0.00%	1,596	40.23%	3,967
Racine	8,181	41.87%	9,953	50.94%	1,205	6.17%	201	1.03%	0	0.00%	-1,772	-9.07%	19,540
Richland	2,760	53.58%	2,187	42.46%	26	0.50%	176	3.42%	2	0.04%	573	11.12%	5,151
Rock	8,618	46.07%	9,678	51.73%	167	0.89%	240	1.28%	4	0.02%	-1,060	-5.67%	18,707
Rusk	2,078	63.92%	1,000	30.76%	118	3.63%	55	1.69%	0	0.00%	1,078	33.16%	3,251
Sauk	5,582	59.21%	3,585	38.03%	37	0.39%	216	2.29%	8	0.08%	1,997	21.18%	9,428
Sawyer	1,178	57.83%	776	38.10%	56	2.75%	26	1.28%	1	0.05%	402	19.73%	2,037
Shawano	5,036	64.23%	1,421	18.13%	1,335	17.03%	46	0.59%	2	0.03%	3,615	46.11%	7,840
Sheboygan	8,466	49.28%	5,255	30.59%	3,384	19.70%	73	0.42%	0	0.00%	3,211	18.69%	17,178
St. Croix	4,251	56.61%	3,123	41.59%	56	0.75%	78	1.04%	1	0.01%	1,128	15.02%	7,509
Taylor	2,009	54.05%	992	26.69%	681	18.32%	35	0.94%	0	0.00%	1,017	27.36%	3,717
Trempealeau	3,600	65.66%	1,790	32.65%	25	0.46%	64	1.17%	4	0.07%	1,810	33.01%	5,483
Vernon	4,685	71.91%	1,645	25.25%	25	0.38%	159	2.44%	1	0.02%	3,040	46.66%	6,515
Vilas	696	52.85%	450	34.17%	160	12.15%	11	0.84%	0	0.00%	246	18.68%	1,317
Walworth	4,913	47.71%	5,074	49.27%	64	0.62%	245	2.38%	2	0.02%	-161	-1.56%	10,298
Washburn	1,506	60.43%	875	35.11%	79	3.17%	31	1.24%	1	0.04%	631	25.32%	2,492
Washington	5,194	68.51%	1,971	26.00%	374	4.93%	34	0.45%	8	0.11%	3,223	42.51%	7,581
Waukesha	5,593	46.77%	5,898	49.32%	361	3.02%	106	0.89%	0	0.00%	-305	-2.55%	11,958
Waupaca	6,169	62.83%	3,082	31.39%	503	5.12%	59	0.60%	6	0.06%	3,087	31.44%	9,819
Waushara	2,702	56.00%	1,949	40.39%	145	3.01%	28	0.58%	1	0.02%	753	15.61%	4,825
Winnebago	7,814	46.20%	8,005	47.32%	969	5.73%	127	0.75%	0	0.00%	-191	-1.13%	16,915
Wood	4,868	49.61%	3,483	35.49%	1,393	14.20%	69	0.70%	0	0.00%	1,385	14.11%	9,813
Total	366,247	52.98%	247,746	35.84%	71,126	10.29%	6,047	0.87%	128	0.02%	118,501	17.14%	691,294

==== Counties that flipped from Democratic to Republican ====
- Ashland
- Bayfield
- Brown
- Polk
- Portage

==== Counties that flipped from Social-Democratic to Republican ====
- Calumet
- Manitowoc
- Marathon
- Milwaukee
- Sheboygan

==== Counties that flipped from Republican to Democratic ====
- Kenosha
- Langlade
- Oneida
- Racine
- Rock
- Walworth
- Waukesha
- Winnebago

== Bibliography ==
- Gubernatorial Elections, 1787-1997. Washington, D.C.: Congressional Quarterly Inc. 1998. ISBN 1-56802-396-0.
- Glashan, Roy R. (1979). American Governors and Gubernatorial Elections, 1775-1978. Meckler Books. ISBN 0-930466-17-9.
- The Wisconsin Blue Book, 1921. 1921.
