= Carl Minkley =

American politician

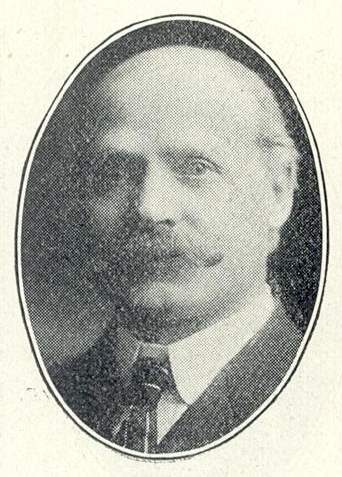
Minkley's official State Assembly portrait, 1913

Carl Minkley (November 14, 1866 – July 26, 1937) was an interior decorator, housepainter, labor movement activist and Socialist Party of America politician from Milwaukee, Wisconsin who served two terms in the Wisconsin State Assembly (as well as being an alderman for the City of Milwaukee).

== Background ==
Minkley was born in Strelno (now Strzelno), in what was then the Kingdom of Prussia, on November 14, 1866. He attended the public schools and studied designing for interior decoration in the trade schools of Berlin, Germany. He became a member of his trade union in 1887, and was elected a delegate from the city of Berlin to its national convention in 1890. Minkley came to the United States in 1892, settling in Milwaukee in 1893. He was a delegate to the national convention of the Brotherhood of Decorators and Painters of America. He became a member of the Socialist Party of America, became the state organizer of the Socialist Party (known in Wisconsin at the "Social-Democratic Party"), and served as a delegate to the national Socialist convention in 1912.

== Elective office ==
Minkley was appointed as alderman-at-large in the city of Milwaukee by mayor Emil Seidel, to fill the vacancy created by the resignation of Victor L. Berger after Berger's 1910 election to Congress. Minkley was first elected a member of the Assembly in the Fourth district of Milwaukee County (20th and 22nd wards of the City of Milwaukee) in 1912, with 2365 votes to 1969 for independent Paul G. Dorow, 1331 for Republican Max J. Leutermann, and 54 for Prohibitionist Peter J. Norgaaard, succeeding his fellow Socialist Max E. Binner (Binner, whose old district had been split up after the 1910 United States census, did not run for re-election.) Minkley served on the Assembly's Committee on Municipalities.

In 1914, he was re-elected by a narrow margin, with 2295 votes to 2209 for Republican Walter F. Mayer. He was assigned to the Committee on the Judiciary for the 1915-1916 Assembly session. In May 1915, he requested an indefinite leave of absence, as the $500 salary and what money he had earned as a housepainter while the Assembly was not in session was insufficient to pay his expenses in Madison. While in the Assembly, he continued his work as Socialist Party state organizer.

He was succeeded in the Assembly in the 1916 election by fellow Socialist Henry Ohl, Jr.

== After the Assembly ==
After leaving the Assembly, Minkley continued as an activist. He frequently appeared before the legislature on behalf of Socialist legislation or on behalf of unions. As a lobbyist for the Brewery Workers Union, he wrote, published and distributed 2,500,000 copies of a pamphlet against Prohibition, and appeared before the United States Senate and five state legislatures in opposition to it.

When the Milwaukee City Hall's Council Chambers were remodelled in 1931, Minkley contributed a stencil design for the ceiling and anteroom on the theme "Human Endeavor and Progress". This led to some complaints from the Milwaukee Art Commission, which condemned the designs as the product of "a painter, not an artist."

In 1934 he was the Socialist nominee for the Fifth Wisconsin State Senate District, garnering 6,458 votes to 10,435 for Democrat Harold Schoenecker, 6,916 for Republican Bernhard Gettleman, and 5.674 for Progressive Gustave Dick.

Minkley's rhetoric was often vigorous. During a 1935 rally in the Assembly chamber in favor of a bill to create a state corporation to operate shuttered factories and employ jobless workers, he told the Assembly that if the bill did not pass, its supporters would return at the next session with baseball bats "to drive you out." In 1937, Minkley was state secretary of the Socialist Party, and expressed the Party's concern that the Civilian Conservation Corps was "a breeding spot for militarism or Fascism."

== Personal life ==
On September 29, 1934, he married Anna Hunter, a widow whom he'd met at the Wisconsin Socialist Party annual picnic in Pleasant Prairie. He already had six children (Carl, Nora, Carla, Clio, Eric and Kurt) by a prior marriage.

He died July 26, 1937, of a stroke.
