= Albert Ehlman =

American politician

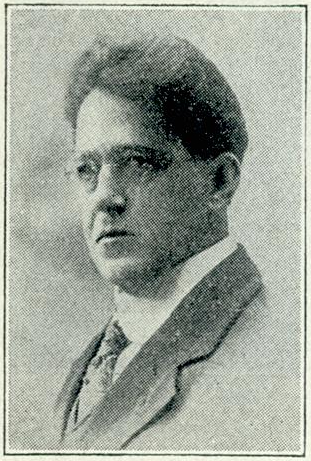
Ehlman's official State Assembly portrait, 1919

Albert Charles Ehlman (November 10, 1876 – 1930) was a lawyer, schoolteacher and professor from Milwaukee, Wisconsin, United States, who served one term as a Socialist member of the Wisconsin State Assembly.

== Background ==
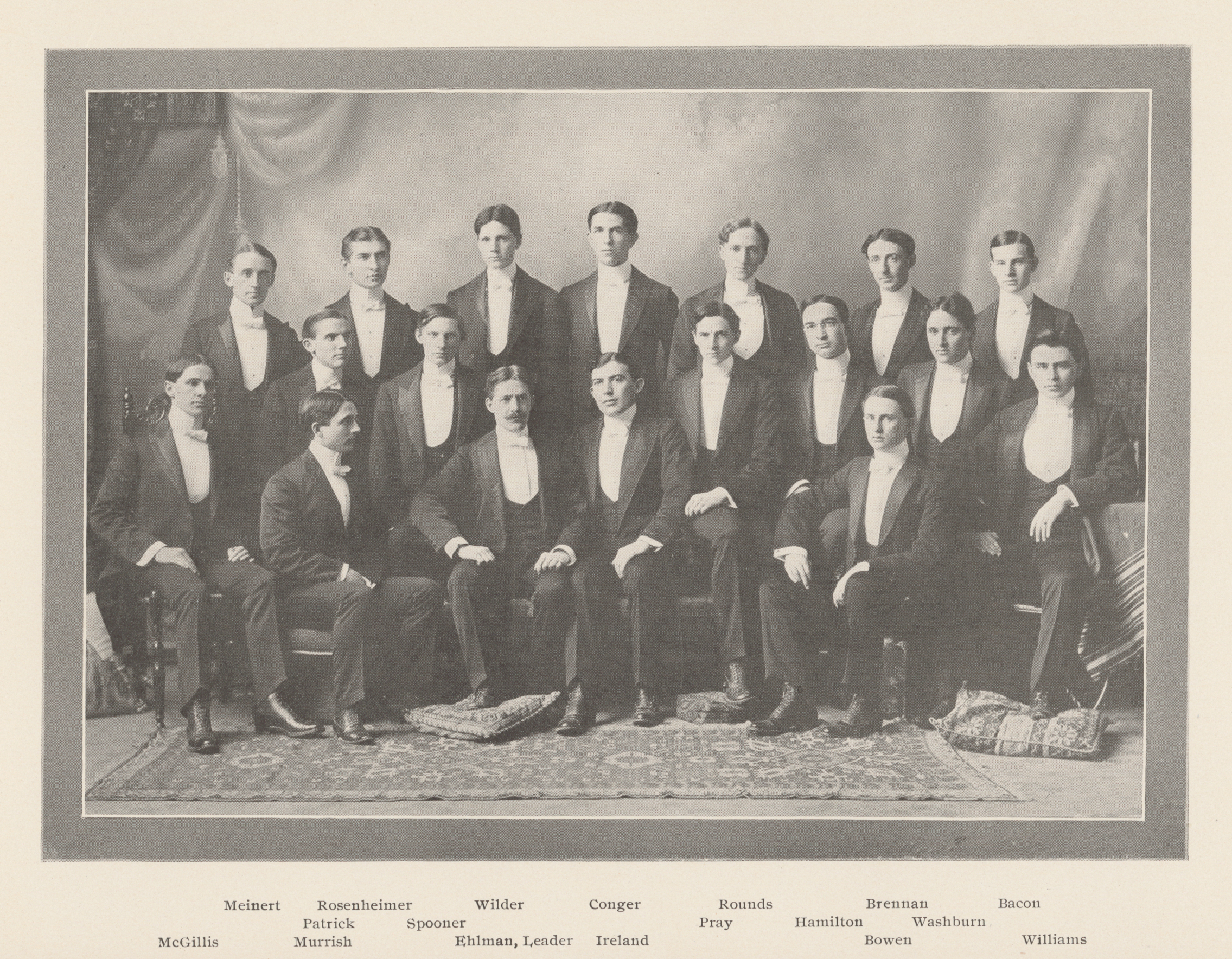
Ehlman (bottom row, third from left) as leader of the glee club at the University of Wisconsin–Madison, 1902

Ehlman was born in Milwaukee on November 10, 1876, the son of William A. and Frances Graham Ehlman. He was educated in Milwaukee public schools (his father was a teacher and then superintendent of music for the Milwaukee Public Schools). He attended what was then known as the University of Wisconsin (while in college he was leader of the Glee and Mandolin Clubs and the University Band, and was an instructor in the School of Music), studied law, and in 1898 passed the state bar examination. He taught in several high schools of Wisconsin, and at Western Kentucky State Normal School at Bowling Green, Kentucky. He practiced law briefly in Chicago, but in 1903 he returned to Milwaukee to open a law office.

== Legislature ==
He was elected to the Assembly in 1918 to succeed fellow Socialist Henry Ohl, Jr. as a member for the Fourth district of Milwaukee County (20th and 22nd wards of the City of Milwaukee), receiving 4,122 votes to 1,868 for Democrat Elmer Marlette, and 68 for Progressive John C. Clayton. He was appointed to the standing committee on the judiciary.

He did not run for re-election in 1920, and was succeeded by Republican Charles Meising.

== Personal life ==
On December 26, 1901, Ehlman married Ruby D. Bell of Concord, Wisconsin; as of 1922, they had two children, Neal LeRoy and Beatrice Lucille.
