= Wisconsin State Federation of Labor =

Federation of labor unions in Wisconsin

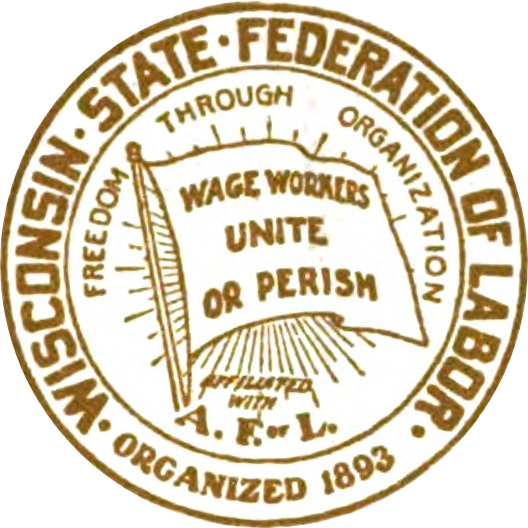
- Abbreviation: WSFL
- Formation: June 6, 1893; 132 years ago
- Affiliations: American Federation of Labor; Farmer-Labor Progressive Federation

The Wisconsin State Federation of Labor (WSFL), affiliated with the American Federation of Labor and the Farmer-Labor Progressive Federation, was the largest federation of labor unions in Wisconsin, from its formation in 1893 at the behest of the Milwaukee Federated Trades Council to its 1958 merger with the smaller CIO-affiliated Wisconsin State Industrial Council to form the Wisconsin AFL-CIO.

A number of WSFL leaders were also elected to public office in Wisconsin, in part due to its roots in and alliance with the Socialist Party, especially Milwaukee's so-called Sewer Socialists.

== Notable WSFL activists ==
- Victor Berger: editor/publisher of one of the WSFL's two official newspapers, and Socialist Congressman
- Andrew Biemiller: professor, editor, Socialist (later Progressive) legislator, WSFL union organizer (hired to supplement his meagre legislative salary), Democratic Congressman, and union lobbyist
- Frederick Brockhausen: cigar maker, WSFL official and Socialist state legislator
- Charles Burhop: cigar maker, WSFL delegate, and Socialist state legislator
- William Coleman: house painter, union organizer, WSFL board member, and Socialist state legislator
- Arthur Kahn: baker, union activist and organizer, and Socialist state legislator
- Frank Metcalfe: glassblower, WSFL board member, Socialist state legislator and nominee for Governor of Wisconsin
- Henry Ohl, Jr.: WSFL official and Socialist state legislator
- Joseph Arthur Padway: labor lawyer, legal counsel for WSFL, Socialist state senator, and later first general counsel of the American Federation of Labor
- L. W. Rogers: teacher, railway brakeman, union officer and organizer, Socialist political activist, and newspaper editor, one of the founders of the WSFL
- Carl Sandburg: reporter, writer, editor, poet, and WSFL delegate
- George J. Schneider: papermaker, vice-president of the International Brotherhood of Paper Makers, WSFL board member and Republican (later Progressive) Congressman
- James P. Sheehan: cigar maker, WSFL board member, Socialist Milwaukee County Supervisor
- David Sigman: pro-labor Progressive state legislator who was hired as a WSFL staffer to supplement his meagre legislative salary
- Frank J. Weber: seaman, union organizer, first president of the WSFL, and Socialist state legislator

== See also ==
- Texas State Federation of Labor
- Pennsylvania Federation of Labor
- California Labor Federation
