= Max E. Binner =

American politician

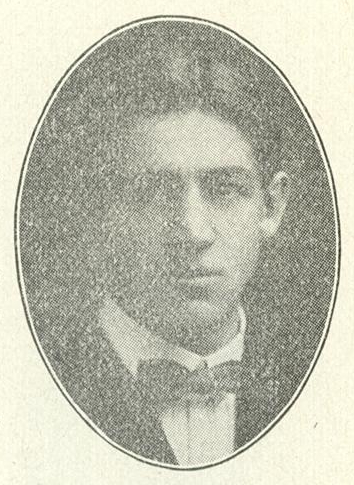
Binner's official State Assembly portrait, 1911

Max E. Binner (January 6, 1883 – March 15, 1943) was a bookkeeper from Milwaukee, Wisconsin who served one term as a Socialist member of the Wisconsin State Assembly.

== Background ==
Binner was born in the city of Erfurt, Germany on January 6, 1883, and was brought to Milwaukee by his parents that same year. He attended public schools in Milwaukee, and continued his studies at the Rhuedes Business College and Milwaukee Law School. He worked as a bookkeeper and occasional teacher of bookkeeping. He also became a member of the Socialist Party (known in Wisconsin as the "Social Democratic Party"), and served on the party's state executive committee.

== Elective office ==
In 1910 Binner was elected to the 12th Milwaukee County assembly district (19th and 22nd wards of the City of Milwaukee) in 1910, receiving 2,36S votes against 1,369 for Democrat James J. Prinz and 1,826 for Garhard P. Plischke. He served on the Committees on Cities and on Printing.

After the 1910 United States census, Binner's district was split between two other districts: the Fourth, where he was succeeded by fellow Socialist Carl Minkley, and the Fifteenth, where he was succeeded by Republican August Dietrich. Binner did not run for re-election. By May 1913, he was Deputy Tax Commissioner for the City of Milwaukee. From 1920 to 1922, Binner served as Clerk of the Milwaukee County, Wisconsin Circuit Court. He died on March 13, 1943.
