= Henry Ohl Jr. =

American politician (1873–1940)

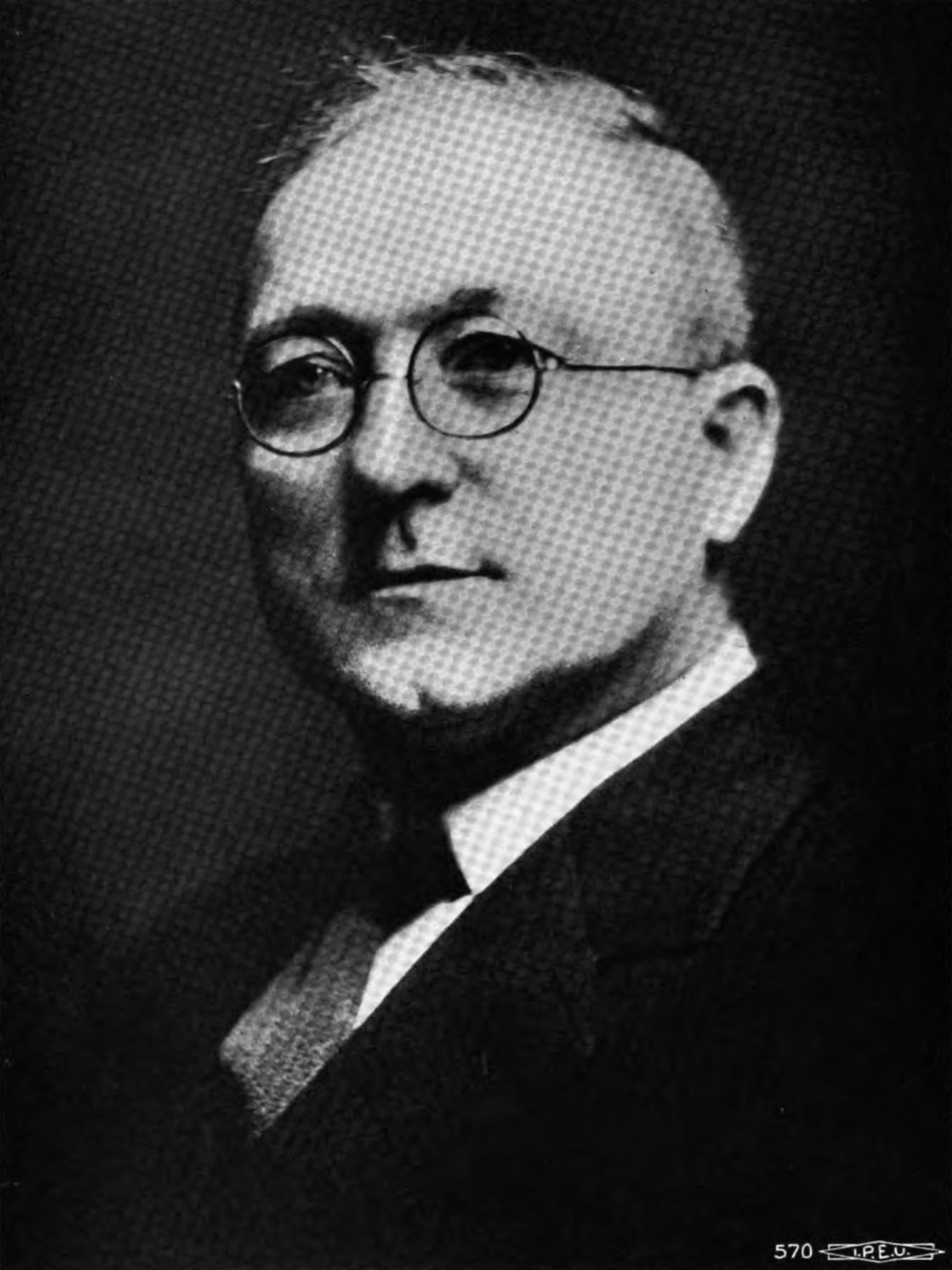
- Ohl c. 1924

President of the Wisconsin State Federation of Labor
- In office July 1923 – October 16, 1940
- Preceded by: Office established
- Succeeded by: Herman Seide

General Organizer of the Wisconsin State Federation of Labor
- In office July 21, 1917 – July 1923
- Preceded by: Frank J. Weber
- Succeeded by: Office abolished

Member of the Wisconsin State Assembly from the Milwaukee 4th district
- In office January 1, 1917 – January 6, 1919
- Preceded by: Carl Minkley
- Succeeded by: Albert Ehlman

Personal details
- Born: March 16, 1873 Milwaukee, Wisconsin, U.S.
- Died: October 16, 1940 (aged 67) Milwaukee, Wisconsin, U.S.
- Party: Socialist (before 1937); Progressive (after 1937)
- Occupation: Typographer

Henry J. Ohl Jr. (March 16, 1873 – October 16, 1940) was a Wisconsin typographer and trade union leader, president for many years of the Wisconsin State Federation of Labor (WSFL). He also served one term as a Socialist member of the Wisconsin State Assembly from Milwaukee.

== Background ==
Ohl was born in the city of Milwaukee March 16, 1873, attended the public schools, and became a typographer and member of the International Typographical Union. He had been active in the union movement of Wisconsin, for some time, and was a member of the Wisconsin State Federation of Labor Executive Board, and union organizer for the American Federation of Labor and Wisconsin Federation of Labor, when elected to the legislature.

== Politics ==
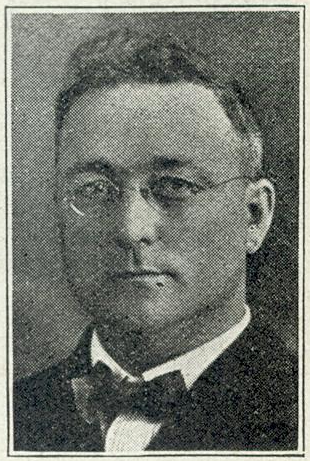
Ohl's official State Assembly portrait, 1917

Ohl was an active member of the Socialist Party of Milwaukee, and served as deputy city clerk under Socialist mayor Emil Seidel from 1910-1912. He was elected in 1916 to succeed fellow Socialist Carl Minkley as a member of the State Assembly for the Fourth district of Milwaukee County (20th and 22nd wards of the City of Milwaukee), with 3057 votes to 2987 for Republican F. Meyer and 1381 for Democrat J.P. O'Neil. He was assigned to the standing committee on state affairs. He did not run for re-election in 1918, and was succeeded by fellow Socialist Albert Ehlman.

== Labor movement ==
Ohl succeeded Frank J. Weber as head of the WSFL in 1917 and continued to lead it until his death, under the titles of general organizer (1917–1923) and then president (1923–1940), lobbying for the labor movement with the legislature after his term was completed. He served as a member of the Federal Board of Vocational Education and Franklin Roosevelt's Advisory Council on Economic Security.

During the early 1920s Ohl was active in the Conference for Progressive Political Action, and in 1935 helped muster labor support to form the Farmer-Labor Progressive Federation which coordinated the Wisconsin Progressive Party with the Socialists, progressive farmer organizations and other groups. He finally broke with the Socialists in 1937 when the national Socialist Party endorsed the Congress of Industrial Organizations over the AFL.

Ohl repeatedly charged that the C.I.O. movement was being used as an instrument for the Communist Party of America to move into and take over American labor unionism. At the 1937 convention of the American Federation of Teachers, Ohl accused, "The full drama of betrayal, as evidenced by events, exposes a treachery never before perpetrated in the annals of labor anywhere. Existing unions were disrupted by the C.I.O., funds were manipulated into C.I.O. channels wherever this could be accomplished."
