= Charles Burhop =

American politician

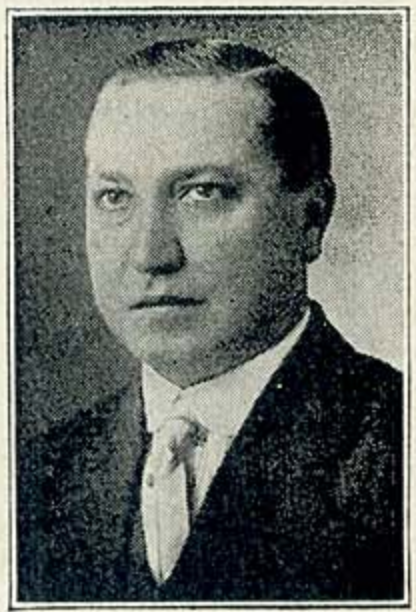
Charles Burhop

Charles Burhop (December 5, 1882 – September 7, 1952) was a Socialist cigarmaker and saloonkeeper from Sheboygan, Wisconsin who served one term (1919–1920) in the Wisconsin State Assembly.

== Background ==
Burhop was born in Sheboygan on December 5, 1882. (His parents, Fred and Anna, had immigrated to Sheboygan from their native Hanover earlier that year.) He was educated in the public schools, and became a cigarmaker, a trade which he followed for 16 years (his older brothers William and Fred owned a cigar factory). Burhop was a Cigar Makers' International Union delegate to the Wisconsin State Federation of Labor's 19th annual convention, held in La Crosse in July 1911, where he served on the convention's Resolutions Committee along with (inter alia) fellow Socialist Carl Sandburg, a delegate from News-writers Union Local 9 of Milwaukee. He served four terms on the Sheboygan County Board of Supervisors, representing two different wards. When elected to the Assembly in 1918 he had "been engaged in the saloon business" for five years.

== Wisconsin Assembly ==
He was the first Socialist ever elected to the assembly from Sheboygan County, being elected to represent the first Sheboygan County district (City of Sheboygan; Town of Sheboygan; and Village of Kohler) in 1918 when he received 2,082 votes to 1,433 for Republican Henry L. Mueller, and 697 for Democrat John B. Steffes. (The Republican incumbent, ship chandler John J. Koepsell, was not a candidate for re-election.) Burhop was defeated for re-election in 1920 by Republican William G. Kaufmann.

== Later career ==
Burhop served on the Sheboygan County Board of Supervisors from 1935 until his death. He died at St. Nicholas Hospital in Sheboygan, Wisconsin after undergoing surgery. He had been in ill health.
