= Charles Meising =

American politician (1876–??)

Charles Meising (April 9, 1876 – ?) was a salesman from Milwaukee, Wisconsin, who served one term as a Republican member of the Wisconsin State Assembly, and conducted several less successful campaigns.

== Background ==
Meising was born in Taylors Falls, Minnesota on April 9, 1876, was educated in the public schools of Kansas City, Missouri, and for several years worked as a manufacturer's agent in Milwaukee. He had twice run for Milwaukee county supervisor, once for Milwaukee alderman and once for the Wisconsin State Senate (in 1916), but never held a public office until elected to the Assembly in 1920.

== Legislature ==
Meising was elected to the Assembly in 1920 to succeed Socialist Albert Ehlman (who did not seek re-election) as a member for the Fourth district of Milwaukee County (20th and 22nd wards of the City of Milwaukee), receiving 7278 votes to 6664 for Socialist Louis J. Green. He was appointed to the standing committee on fish and game.

He ran for re-election in 1922, but lost to Socialist Albert F. Woller, who polled 3,246 votes to Meising's 2,049. He tried to regain the seat in 1924, losing to Socialist William Coleman; and again losing to Coleman in 1926.

In 1930 he unsuccessfully challenged Socialist incumbent Philip Wenz in the general election for the Assembly's 7th Milwaukee County seat, losing with 1103 votes to 1443 for Wenz, 314 for Democrat Fred Stich, and 34 for Jack Schwab.
