= Clarence Kretlow =

American politician

Clarence C. Kretlow (December 3, 1892 – August 2, 1954) was an American politician.

Born in Milwaukee, Wisconsin, Kretlow served as a sergeant in the United States Army during World War I. He went to Badger State Business College. He was an inspector for the Milwaukee Gas and Light Company in 1909. He was an assistant cemetery inspector and was involved in the recreation business. Kretlow was involved with the Democratic Party and was an inspector of elections. In 1933 and 1935, Kretlow served in the Wisconsin State Assembly. He then served as deputy collector of internal revenue and was transfer from Milwaukee to Merrill, Wisconsin, in 1943; he resigned, in 1950, because of ill health. Kretlow served on the Merrill Common Council and the Lincoln County, Wisconsin Board of Supervisors. Kretlow died in Merrill, Wisconsin from a heart attack.
