= Socialist Party of Wisconsin =

- Founded: 1973
- Headquarters: Milwaukee, Wisconsin
- Ideology: Democratic socialism Socialist feminism
- National affiliation: Socialist Party USA
- Colors: Red

The Socialist Party of Wisconsin (SPWI) is a defunct political party in the U.S. state of Wisconsin affiliated with Socialist Party USA (SPUSA). Frank Zeidler, who was mayor of Milwaukee from 1948 to 1960, served as the national chairman of SPUSA from its establishment in 1973 until 1984. Zeidler was the party's presidential nominee in 1976. Diane Drufenbrock, a Milwaukee resident, was the Socialist Party USA nominee for vice-president in 1980.

== History ==
The Socialist Party of America voted 73:34 to change its name to Social Democrats, USA in December 1972. SPUSA was founded in 1973, after which the SPWI was founded.

The Socialist Party had two locals, the Milwaukee County Local and the South Central Wisconsin Local.

William Osborne Hart ran for office more than 20 times as a member of the Socialist Party. He was a candidate for lieutenant governor in 1948, Supreme Court in 1949, governor in 1950 and 1974. He also challenged William Proxmire for United States Senate in the 1970s.

== Notable members ==
- Diane Drufenbrock, Milwaukee resident and Socialist Party USA nominee for vice-president in 1980
- Angela Nicole Walker, Milwaukee resident and Socialist Party USA nominee for vice-president in 2016
- Frank Zeidler, Mayor of Milwaukee (1948-1960), chairman of the Socialist Party USA (1973-1984) and Socialist Party USA nominee for president in 1976
