= Farmer-Labor Progressive Federation =

- Abbreviation: FLPF
- Founded: November, 30, 1935
- Ideology: Progressivism; Socialism; Factions: La Folletteism
- Political position: Left-wing to far-left

The Farmer-Labor Progressive Federation (FLPF) also referred to as the Farmer-Labor Progressive Federation of Wisconsin was a political organization which acted as a de facto branch of the United States Farmer-Labor movement within the state of Wisconsin and as a faction within the Wisconsin Progressive party.

== History ==
The FLPF was a collation of Progressive, Liberal and Socialist organizations and political party's such as the Socialist Party of Wisconsin, Wisconsin Progressive Party, Wisconsin State Federation of Labor and the Farmer-Labor Progressive League. The purpose of the organization was to act as a united political front to push legislative reform and to exsert influence over the Wisconsin Progressive party in order to move the parties ideology in a Left-wing direction. The FLPF sought to push the Wisconsin Progressive party to be more aligned with the national Farmer-Labor Movement and criticized the party for the amount of control that the La Follette's held over it, as well as that there was no way for the general population to influence the parties political program without the FLPF's involvement. With the formation of the FLPF on November, 30, 1935, the organization stated:

"This Farmer-Labor Federation proposes to change the present economic system based primarily on production for profit to an economic system based primarily on production for use. Production for use means that the basic monopolistically-controlled industries shall be cooperatively or publicly owned. Therefore, organized Wisconsin workers, farmers and other liberal and progressive forces join together in a federation for political education and action."

The first elections the FLPF took part in were the 1936 United States elections. Twenty-seven members of the Wisconsin State Assembly and eight members of the Wisconsin State Senate held membership with the FLPF.

== See also ==
- Minnesota Farmer-Labor Party
- Iowa Farmer-Labor Party
- Thomas Ryum Amlie
- Thomas Duncan
