= Ronald Schneider (historian) =

Ronald Milton Schneider is a political scientist who is a professor at Queens College. He is known for writing Communism in Guatemala: 1944 to 1954, a book which documented the increasing influence of communism during the Guatemalan Revolution.

== Biography ==
Ronald Schneider was born in Minneapolis, and went to school in Valley City, North Dakota. In 1954 he graduated from Northwestern University in Evanston, Illinois. He ranked at the top of his class at graduation. He received his Master's Degree in political science from Princeton University in 1956, and received his Ph.D in 1958. By 1959 he had begun to work as a political analyst for the US State Department. While working there, he was briefly assigned to the US embassy in Rio de Janeiro. For seven years beginning in 1963 Schneider was an associate professor of public law and government at Columbia University, where was also an active part of the Institute of Latin American Studies. Later he became a professor of political science at Queens College. He has written several books on Central and South America. His wife is of Panamanian origin, and is also a scholar of Latin America.

== Communism in Guatemala ==
While still a student at Princeton in October 1956, he was granted access to the files gathered during Operation PBHistory by the US Central Intelligence Agency, and given permission to write a book about the events surrounding the 1954 Guatemalan coup d'état. Schneider wrote the book while he was a research assistant at the Foreign Policy Research Institute (FPRI), a think-tank in Philadelphia. After spending an initial six months with the PBHistory materials, Schneider also traveled to Guatemala and Mexico to further research his book, where he was assisted in his research by his wife. Schneider's book is likely to have been subsidized by the CIA, possibly without his knowledge. The book was described as a balanced presentation of the subject, and as "easily the most comprehensive and best documented work on that subject." It found no evidence that Guatemalan communism had been influenced by the Soviet Union. Despite being based on documents gathered by a CIA operation, the book did not attempt to justify the coup: Max Holland stated that it bore similarities to the work of Robert Alexander, who was critical of the policies pursued by the US in Guatemala.

== Sources ==
- Cullather, Nick (1999). Secret History: The CIA's Classified Account of Its Operations in Guatemala, 1952-1954. Stanford University Press. ISBN 9780804733113.
- Holland, Max (2004). "Operation PBHistory: The Aftermath of SUCCESS". International Journal of Intelligence and CounterIntelligence. 17 (2): 300–332. doi:10.1080/08850600490274935. S2CID 153570470.
- "Ronald Schneider". worldleaders.columbia.edu. Columbia University.
