= Norman R. Klug =

American politician

Norman R. Klug (June 9, 1905 – October 24, 1966) was a member of the Wisconsin State Assembly and a president of the Miller Brewing Company.

Born in Milwaukee, Wisconsin. He attended Washington High School before attending Marquette University, eventually graduating from Marquette University Law School in 1927. He became a vice president at Miller and following the death of Fred Miller in a plane crash in 1954, Klug became the first outside the Miller family to head the company.

Klug died at age 61 of a heart attack.

== Career ==
Klug was first elected to the Assembly in 1928. He was a Republican.
