= Iowa Farmer–Labor Party =

Farmer-Labor Party of Iowa
- Abbreviation: FLP
- Leader: Wallace M. Short
- Ideology: Agrarianism; Laborism; Progressivism

The Iowa Farmer-Labor Party (FLP) or the Farmer-Labor Party of Iowa was a political party in the American state of Iowa.

== History ==
The Farmer-Labor Party of Iowa was affiliated with the Farmer-Labor Movement. During the 1938 Midterms in the United States, the party suffered an internal conflict on whether to support Philip La Follette and his plans for the National Progressives of America, or to stay in line with the Elmer A. Benson and the Minnesota Farmer-Labor Party resulting in a split within the party. The Farmer-Labor Party of Iowa became the first state organization to announce its support for the National Progressives of America.
