= Charles J. Kersten =

American politician

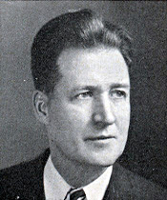

Member of the U.S. House of Representatives from Wisconsin's 5th district
- In office January 3, 1951 – January 3, 1955
- Preceded by: Andrew Biemiller
- Succeeded by: Henry S. Reuss
- In office January 3, 1947 – January 3, 1949
- Preceded by: Andrew Biemiller
- Succeeded by: Andrew Biemiller

Personal details
- Born: May 26, 1902 Chicago, Illinois, US
- Died: October 31, 1972 (aged 70) Milwaukee, Wisconsin, US
- Party: Republican

Charles Joseph Kersten (May 26, 1902 – October 31, 1972) was a U.S. representative from Wisconsin.

Born in Chicago, Illinois, Kersten graduated from Marquette University College of Law, Milwaukee, Wisconsin, in 1925 and was admitted to the bar the same year. He commenced the practice of law in Milwaukee, Wisconsin, in 1928, serving as first assistant district attorney of Milwaukee County from 1937-1943 under District Attorney Herbert Steffes.

Kersten was elected as a Republican to the Eightieth Congress (January 3, 1947 – January 3, 1949) as the representative of Wisconsin's 5th congressional district. A novice politician, Kersten won the nomination over seven opponents, using the slogan “Put Kersten in Congress and Keep Communism Out.” The one-term Democratic incumbent, Andrew Biemiller, was a former Socialist and accused of being a Communist. Kersten was a close friend of fellow freshman Congressman Richard Nixon. Kersten was an unsuccessful candidate for reelection in 1948 to the Eighty-first Congress, losing to Biemiller.

Kersten was elected to the Eighty-second and Eighty-third Congresses (January 3, 1951 – January 3, 1955), defeating Biemiller both times and once again representing Wisconsin's 5th district. He served as chairman of the United States House Select Committee to Investigate Communist Aggression and the Forced Incorporation of the Baltic States into the U.S.S.R. during the Eighty-third Congress. Kersten successfully amended a foreign aid bill in 1951 to permit refugees from behind the Iron Curtain to form NATO military units. The eponymic feat of the Kersten Amendment, however, led to no such units, the Joint Chiefs being opposed to its implementation. He was an unsuccessful candidate for reelection in 1954, losing to Henry S. Reuss, and failed in his bid for renomination in 1956, as of 2018 making him the last Republican to represent Milwaukee in the U.S. Congress. In between these campaigns Kersten briefly served in the Eisenhower administration under Nelson Rockefeller as White House consultant on psychological warfare (1955–1956). He then resumed his law practice, remaining active in anticommunist circles until his death on October 31, 1972, in Milwaukee, Wisconsin. He was interred in Holy Cross Cemetery.

== Sources ==
- United States Congress. "Charles J. Kersten (id: K000150)". Biographical Directory of the United States Congress.

U.S. House of Representatives
Preceded by Andrew Biemiller	Member of the U.S. House of Representatives from Wisconsin's 5th congressional district January 3, 1947 – January 3, 1949	Succeeded by Andrew Biemiller
Preceded by Andrew Biemiller	Member of the U.S. House of Representatives from Wisconsin's 5th congressional district January 3, 1951 – January 3, 1955	Succeeded by Henry S. Reuss
