= Kersten Committee =

1950s US House select committee

The Select Committee to Investigate Communist Aggression and the Forced Incorporation of the Baltic States into the U.S.S.R., also known as the Kersten Committee after its chairman U.S. Representative Charles J. Kersten, was established in 1953 to investigate the annexation of Estonia, Latvia, and Lithuania into the Soviet Union. The committee terminated March 4, 1954, when it was replaced by the Select Committee on Communist Aggression.

== Background ==
In 1940, in accordance with the secret protocol of the 1939 Molotov–Ribbentrop Pact with Nazi Germany, the Soviet Union directed the occupation and subsequent annexation of Estonia, Latvia, and Lithuania. In each country, demands were made under threat of force from Moscow for puppet communist governments to be formed. Fraudulent elections were held in July 1940 with solely communists being represented in the parliament of each country's government. Those governments then were instructed by Moscow to petition the Soviet government to be added as constituent Soviet republics.

The United States, like other Western democratic powers, such as the United Kingdom, Norway, France, and Denmark, never recognized the incorporation as valid and continued to accredit the legations of Estonia, Latvia, and Lithuania. On June 23, 1940, U.S. Secretary of State Sumner Welles declared the American non-recognition policy on the principles of the Stimson Doctrine. The policy was maintained until the 1991 restoration of independence in all three countries.

== Investigation ==
In 1953, the House of Representatives passed House Resolution 346 calling for a special investigation into the incorporation of the Baltic states into the Soviet Union. The House Select Baltic Committee was established on July 27, 1953, to oversee the investigation, which was chaired by Charles J. Kersten.

The select committee held hearings between November 30 and December 11, 1953, and reported its findings in February 1954. During the investigation, the Baltic Committee interviewed approximately 100 witnesses including Johannes Klesment, a former Estonian government official; Jonas Černius, the former prime minister of Lithuania; Juozas Brazaitis, the acting foreign minister of Lithuania; and former President of the United States Herbert Hoover, all of whom provided testimony and additional information about Soviet activities in Estonia, Latvia, and Lithuania in 1940.

Among those accused of crimes during the Baltic occupation process were the Soviet politicians Andrei Zhdanov and Andrey Vyshinsky.

== Significance ==
The significance of the Kersten Committee was primarily related to the U.S. non-recognition policy of the Soviet incorporation of Estonia, Latvia, and Lithuania. However, the investigation at the time was seen as a way for the U.S. Congress to better study the manner in which the Soviet Union was able to direct the seizure of power in foreign countries. Specifically, the investigation coincided with United States involvement in the Korean War and was seen by investigators as a way of studying communist methods that could be used in better articulating policy related to that conflict. Continued interest in the subject led the U.S. House of Representatives to replace the Baltic Committee with the Select Committee on Communist Aggression, which continued to operate until December 31, 1954.

== Sources ==
- Hearings Before the Select Committee to Investigate the Incorporation of the Baltic States into the U.S.S.R., 83rd United States Congress, First Session, Under Authority of H. Res. 346, Part I (1954)
