= 1902 Milwaukee mayoral election =

← 1900	April 1, 1902	1904 →
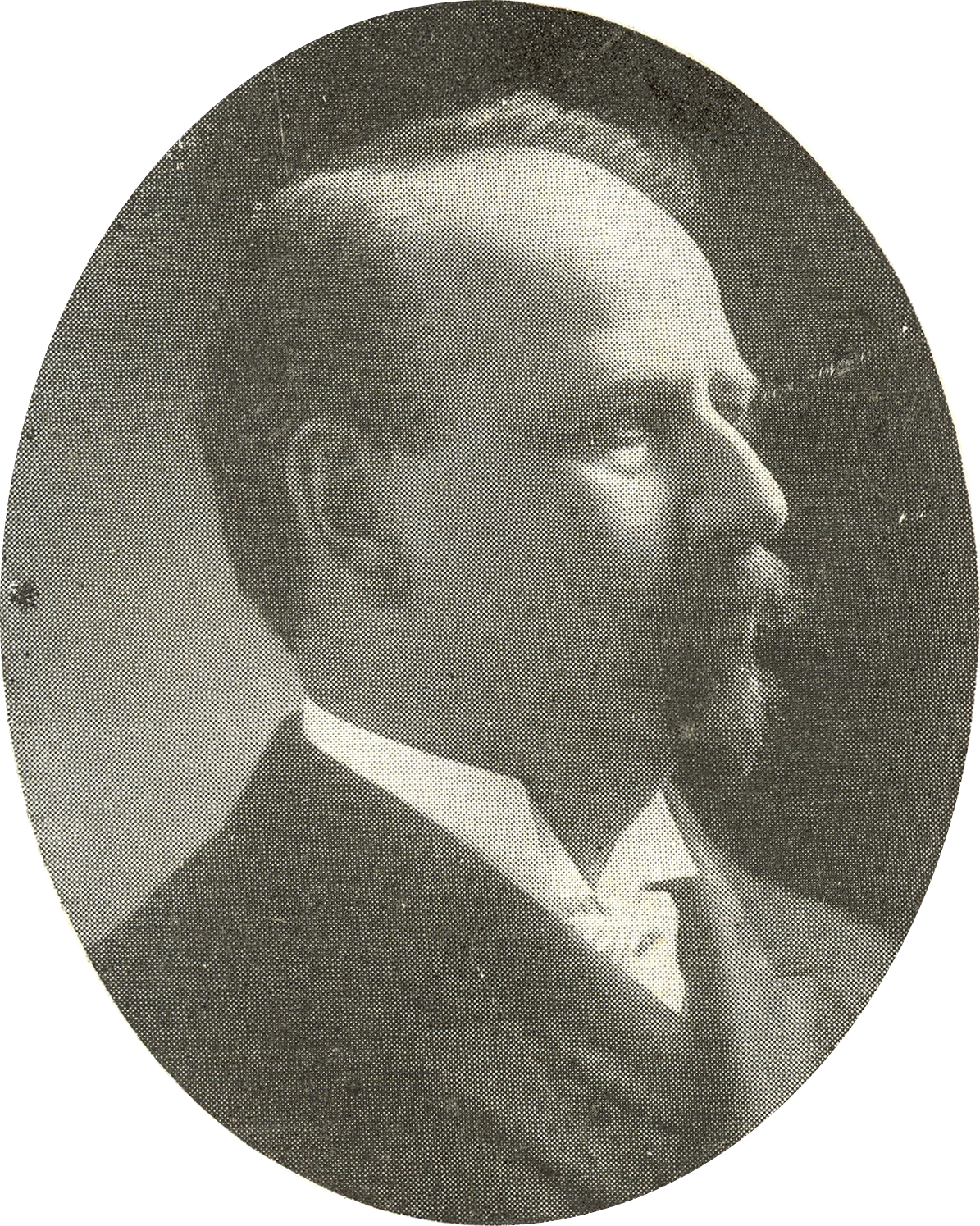

Nominee	David S. Rose	Charles H. Anson	Howard Tuttle
Party	Democratic	Republican	Social-Democratic
Popular vote	29,031	20,743	8,373
Percentage	49.93%	35.67%	14.40%
Mayor before election
David S. Rose
Democratic
Elected mayor
David S. Rose
Democratic

An election for Mayor of Milwaukee was held on April 1, 1902. Incumbent mayor David S. Rose was re-elected with 50% of the vote.

Candidates included incumbent mayor David S. Rose, former state assemblyman Charles H. Anson, and Social Democrat Howard Tuttle.

== Results ==
Milwaukee mayoral election, 1902
Party	Candidate	Votes	%
Democratic	David S. Rose	29,031	49.93
Republican	Charles H. Anson	20,743	35.67
Social-Democratic	Howard Tuttle	8,373	14.40
Total votes		58,511	100.00
