= 1956 United States presidential election in Wisconsin =

- November 6, 1956

Nominee	Dwight D. Eisenhower	Adlai Stevenson
Party	Republican	Democratic
Home state	Pennsylvania (Note: Although he was born in Texas and grew up in Kansas before his military career, at the time of the 1952 election Eisenhower was president of Columbia University and was, officially, a resident of New York. During his first term as president, he moved his private residence to Gettysburg, Pennsylvania, and officially changed his residency to Pennsylvania.)	Illinois
Running mate	Richard Nixon	Estes Kefauver
Electoral vote	12	0
Popular vote	954,844	586,768
Percentage	61.58%	37.84%
County results
Eisenhower
50–60%
60–70%
70–80%
Stevenson
50–60%
President before election
Dwight D. Eisenhower
Republican
Elected President
Dwight D. Eisenhower
Republican

The 1956 United States presidential election in Wisconsin was held on November 6, 1956, as part of the 1956 United States presidential election. State voters chose 12 electors to the Electoral College, who voted for president and vice president.

Politics in Wisconsin since the Populist movement had been dominated by the Republican Party. The Democratic Party became uncompetitive away from the Lake Michigan coast as the upper classes, along with the majority of workers who followed them, fled from William Jennings Bryan's agrarian and free silver sympathies. Although the state did develop a strong Social-Democratic Party to provide opposition to the GOP, Wisconsin developed the direct Republican primary in 1903 and this ultimately created competition between the "League" under Robert M. La Follette, and the conservative "Regular" faction. This ultimately would develop into the Wisconsin Progressive Party in the late 1930s, which was opposed to the conservative German Democrats and to the national Republican Party, and allied with Franklin D. Roosevelt at the federal level.

During the two wartime elections, the formerly Democratic German counties in the east of the state – which had been powerfully opposed to the Civil War because they saw it as a "Yankee" war and opposed the military draft instituted during it – viewed Communism as a much greater threat to America than Nazism and consequently opposed President Roosevelt's war effort. Consequently, these historically Democratic counties became virtually the most Republican in the entire state, and became a major support base for populist conservative Senator Joe McCarthy, who became notorious for his investigations into Communists inside the American government. The state's populace's opposition to Communism and the Korean War turned Wisconsin strongly to Republican nominee Dwight D. Eisenhower in the 1952 presidential election.

For the 1956 rematch, Democratic nominee Adlai Stevenson II began by campaigning against Eisenhower's handling of farm problems, at a time when most of the interior United States was suffering from a severe drought. The Democrat would then attack Eisenhower as a "weak" President when the two were touring the Midwest during September.

Early polls showed Eisenhower leading the state despite farm unrest, owing to the unpopularity of Stevenson. No later poll was taken, but evidence was that state's farmers were not trending to Stevenson at all, and that the Suez Crisis would hurt rather than help Stevenson.

== Polls ==
Source	Rating	As of
The Boston Daily Globe	Likely R	October 23, 1956
Fort Worth Star-Telegram	Safe R	November 2, 1956
Corpus Christi Times	Safe R	November 3, 1956
The Philadelphia Inquirer	Safe R	November 4, 1956
The Salt Lake Tribune	Safe R	November 4, 1956

== Results ==
1956 United States presidential election in Wisconsin
Party	Candidate	Votes	Percentage	Electoral votes
Republican	Dwight D. Eisenhower (incumbent)	954,844	61.58%	12
Democratic	Adlai Stevenson	586,768	37.84%	0
Independent (Note: "Independent Better Government under the Constitution")	T. Coleman Andrews	6,918	0.45%	0
Social-Democratic (Note: "Independent Socialist")	Darlington Hoopes	754	0.05%	0
Socialist Labor (Note: "Independent Socialist Labor")	Eric Hass	710	0.05%	0
Socialist Workers (Note: "Independent Socialist Workers")	Farrell Dobbs	564	0.04%	0
Totals		1,550,558	100.00%	12

=== Results by county ===
County	Dwight D. Eisenhower Republican		Adlai Stevenson Democratic		T. Coleman Andrews Independent		Other candidates Various parties		Margin		Total votes cast
County	#	%	#	%	#	%	#	%	#	%	Total votes cast
Adams	1,854	59.48%	1,244	39.91%	15	0.48%	4	0.13%	610	19.57%	3,117
Ashland	4,121	52.70%	3,677	47.03%	16	0.20%	5	0.06%	444	5.67%	7,819
Barron	8,634	61.12%	5,419	38.36%	44	0.31%	29	0.21%	3,215	22.76%	14,126
Bayfield	3,096	53.32%	2,691	46.35%	8	0.14%	11	0.19%	405	6.97%	5,806
Brown	32,878	70.24%	13,642	29.14%	246	0.53%	42	0.09%	19,236	41.10%	46,808
Buffalo	3,387	59.83%	2,266	40.03%	7	0.12%	1	0.02%	1,121	19.80%	5,661
Burnett	2,198	52.36%	1,986	47.31%	7	0.17%	7	0.17%	212	5.05%	4,198
Calumet	6,166	74.22%	2,099	25.26%	38	0.46%	5	0.06%	4,067	48.96%	8,308
Chippewa	9,781	59.42%	6,617	40.20%	58	0.35%	5	0.03%	3,164	19.22%	16,461
Clark	7,941	62.26%	4,765	37.36%	39	0.31%	9	0.07%	3,176	24.90%	12,754
Columbia	10,120	66.01%	5,158	33.65%	45	0.29%	7	0.05%	4,962	32.36%	15,330
Crawford	4,123	61.71%	2,522	37.75%	31	0.46%	5	0.07%	1,601	23.96%	6,681
Dane	38,955	51.11%	36,891	48.41%	295	0.39%	72	0.09%	2,064	2.70%	76,213
Dodge	17,569	72.10%	6,704	27.51%	76	0.31%	17	0.07%	10,865	44.59%	24,366
Door	6,722	77.96%	1,859	21.56%	32	0.37%	9	0.10%	4,863	56.40%	8,622
Douglas	9,183	44.79%	11,276	55.00%	22	0.11%	21	0.10%	-2,093	-10.21%	20,502
Dunn	6,401	60.36%	4,189	39.50%	11	0.10%	3	0.03%	2,212	20.86%	10,604
Eau Claire	13,122	58.48%	9,276	41.34%	33	0.15%	8	0.04%	3,846	17.14%	22,439
Florence	1,003	57.94%	723	41.77%	4	0.23%	1	0.06%	280	16.17%	1,731
Fond du Lac	21,496	72.46%	7,940	26.76%	207	0.70%	23	0.08%	13,556	45.70%	29,666
Forest	2,039	57.03%	1,527	42.71%	8	0.22%	1	0.03%	512	14.32%	3,575
Grant	11,648	68.69%	5,208	30.71%	92	0.54%	10	0.06%	6,440	37.98%	16,958
Green	7,114	66.00%	3,614	33.53%	43	0.40%	8	0.07%	3,500	32.47%	10,779
Green Lake	5,441	76.49%	1,643	23.10%	25	0.35%	4	0.06%	3,798	53.39%	7,113
Iowa	5,201	61.79%	3,176	37.73%	36	0.43%	4	0.05%	2,025	24.06%	8,417
Iron	1,930	46.22%	2,226	53.30%	14	0.34%	6	0.14%	-296	-7.08%	4,176
Jackson	3,614	56.66%	2,755	43.20%	7	0.11%	2	0.03%	859	13.46%	6,378
Jefferson	13,357	67.02%	6,452	32.37%	94	0.47%	28	0.14%	6,905	34.65%	19,931
Juneau	5,135	67.58%	2,428	31.96%	30	0.39%	5	0.07%	2,707	35.62%	7,598
Kenosha	21,367	55.08%	17,094	44.06%	269	0.69%	66	0.17%	4,273	11.02%	38,796
Kewaunee	5,106	68.00%	2,364	31.48%	31	0.41%	8	0.11%	2,742	36.52%	7,509
La Crosse	18,264	61.66%	11,258	38.01%	73	0.25%	27	0.09%	7,006	23.65%	29,622
Lafayette	4,733	59.33%	3,212	40.26%	30	0.38%	3	0.04%	1,521	19.07%	7,978
Langlade	5,004	63.82%	2,804	35.76%	28	0.36%	5	0.06%	2,200	28.06%	7,841
Lincoln	6,329	67.74%	2,880	30.83%	118	1.26%	16	0.17%	3,449	36.91%	9,343
Manitowoc	18,078	61.91%	10,800	36.99%	291	1.00%	30	0.10%	7,278	24.92%	29,199
Marathon	22,586	59.36%	15,301	40.21%	126	0.33%	38	0.10%	7,285	19.15%	38,051
Marinette	8,874	63.12%	5,113	36.37%	63	0.45%	10	0.07%	3,761	26.75%	14,060
Marquette	2,796	73.87%	975	25.76%	14	0.37%	0	0.00%	1,821	48.11%	3,785
Milwaukee	227,253	55.79%	177,286	43.53%	1,783	0.44%	996	0.24%	49,967	12.26%	407,318
Monroe	7,460	63.16%	4,311	36.50%	27	0.23%	13	0.11%	3,149	26.66%	11,811
Oconto	6,836	64.95%	3,632	34.51%	51	0.48%	6	0.06%	3,204	30.44%	10,525
Oneida	6,261	64.89%	3,328	34.49%	51	0.53%	8	0.08%	2,933	30.40%	9,648
Outagamie	26,090	76.56%	7,725	22.67%	236	0.69%	26	0.08%	18,365	53.89%	34,077
Ozaukee	9,808	69.63%	4,139	29.38%	126	0.89%	13	0.09%	5,669	40.25%	14,086
Pepin	1,975	65.51%	1,040	34.49%	0	0.00%	0	0.00%	935	31.02%	3,015
Pierce	5,782	61.13%	3,644	38.53%	25	0.26%	7	0.07%	2,138	22.60%	9,458
Polk	5,894	54.04%	4,985	45.71%	14	0.13%	13	0.12%	909	8.33%	10,906
Portage	8,320	54.08%	7,010	45.56%	41	0.27%	15	0.10%	1,310	8.52%	15,386
Price	4,028	58.82%	2,778	40.57%	27	0.39%	15	0.22%	1,250	18.25%	6,848
Racine	31,968	58.21%	22,646	41.24%	248	0.45%	57	0.10%	9,322	16.97%	54,919
Richland	5,062	64.29%	2,783	35.34%	26	0.33%	3	0.04%	2,279	28.95%	7,874
Rock	28,980	67.42%	13,834	32.18%	148	0.34%	25	0.06%	15,146	35.24%	42,987
Rusk	3,433	53.68%	2,929	45.80%	24	0.38%	9	0.14%	504	7.88%	6,395
Sauk	10,644	66.46%	5,292	33.04%	61	0.38%	19	0.12%	5,352	33.42%	16,016
Sawyer	2,823	64.54%	1,520	34.75%	26	0.59%	5	0.11%	1,303	29.79%	4,374
Shawano	9,388	71.54%	3,675	28.01%	54	0.41%	5	0.04%	5,713	43.53%	13,122
Sheboygan	22,077	59.91%	14,540	39.46%	182	0.49%	53	0.14%	7,537	20.45%	36,852
St. Croix	6,956	55.72%	5,499	44.05%	21	0.17%	8	0.06%	1,457	11.67%	12,484
Taylor	3,843	57.75%	2,759	41.46%	35	0.53%	17	0.26%	1,084	16.29%	6,654
Trempealeau	5,476	54.25%	4,602	45.59%	9	0.09%	7	0.07%	874	8.66%	10,094
Vernon	6,200	55.66%	4,923	44.19%	15	0.13%	2	0.02%	1,277	11.47%	11,140
Vilas	3,683	74.07%	1,267	25.48%	19	0.38%	3	0.06%	2,416	48.59%	4,972
Walworth	16,696	76.62%	4,922	22.59%	152	0.70%	20	0.09%	11,774	54.03%	21,790
Washburn	2,798	58.88%	1,935	40.72%	14	0.29%	5	0.11%	863	18.16%	4,752
Washington	12,167	72.93%	4,447	26.66%	59	0.35%	10	0.06%	7,720	46.27%	16,683
Waukesha	35,212	68.93%	15,496	30.33%	313	0.61%	63	0.12%	19,716	38.60%	51,084
Waupaca	11,798	78.64%	3,133	20.88%	66	0.44%	6	0.04%	8,665	57.76%	15,003
Waushara	4,717	76.99%	1,387	22.64%	20	0.33%	3	0.05%	3,330	54.35%	6,127
Winnebago	28,759	71.44%	11,115	27.61%	353	0.88%	27	0.07%	17,644	43.83%	40,254
Wood	15,091	69.92%	6,412	29.71%	66	0.31%	14	0.06%	8,679	40.21%	21,583
Totals	954,844	61.58%	586,768	37.84%	6,918	0.45%	2,028	0.13%	368,076	23.74%	1,550,558

==== Counties that flipped from Democratic to Republican ====
- Kenosha

== Analysis ==
As it turned out, despite the doubts of the Boston Daily Globe Eisenhower slightly improved upon his 1952 margin in Wisconsin: although he did lose some support in the farming areas, he gained upon his 1952 vote in Wisconsin's cities due to increased Catholic support, and carried all but two northern counties. Wisconsin's result was 8.34% more Republican than the nation-at-large. As of 2020, this remains the last time a Republican has carried Wisconsin by double digits, as the state would trend Democratic beginning with the 1958 midterm elections, although Democrats have subsequently won Wisconsin by double digits just three times – Lyndon B. Johnson in 1964, Bill Clinton in 1996 and Barack Obama in 2008. This is also the last election as of 2020 in which Ashland County, Dane County, Milwaukee County, and Portage County voted for a Republican presidential candidate. This is also the last election in which Wisconsin voted to the right of Wyoming.

== Electors ==
These were the names of the electors on each ticket.

Dwight D. Eisenhower & Richard M. Nixon Republican Party	Adlai Stevenson & Estes Kefauver Democratic Party (Note: There were only 11 named electors on the Democratic ticket in Wisconsin)	T. Coleman Andrews & Thomas H. Werdel Independent
Warren P. Knowles; Vernon W. Thomson; Elbert H. Neese Jr.; Arthur L. May; Everett Yerly; Margaret S. Needham; John N. Dickinson; Samuel N. Pickard; Robert G. Marotz; Wendall MacEachran; Louis G. Arnold; Willis J. Hutnik	Henry W. Maier; Harold Newton; Thomas Miglautsch; Richard S. McKnight; John Giacomo; William S. Clark; David Rabinovitz; Clarence Mitten; John Reynolds; Keith C. Hardie; Thomas J. Joyce	Henry Reamer; Edward Niffenegger Jr.; Henry H. Swan; Edward J. Froncek; James F. Mallas; Orville W. Fox; Fannie McMahon; William W. Wolf Jr.; Ronald F. North; William F. Brown; George C. Hildebrant; Georgianna McFetridge

Darlington Hoopes & Samuel H. Friedman Social-Democratic Party	Eric Hass & Georgia Cozzini Socialist Labor Party	Farrell Dobbs & Myra Tanner Weiss Socialist Workers Party
Walter G. Benson; Fred G. Kneevers; William P. Piek; Michael Katzban; Anna Mae Davis; Rudolph Beyer; Ruth Hart; John A. Pearson; Lee Schaal; Joseph Dumont; Fred Dahir; John M. Work	Eugene J. Adolphe; Frank Brlas Jr.; Marko Golubich; William Kelenic; Matthew Karlovich; Henry A. Ochsner; Alex Schaufelberger Jr.; William Schlingman; Ferdinand Schnarsky; Amos Wagner; Arthur Wepfer; Samuel Munek	Albert Stergar; Betsy M. Stergar; Calvin Sherard; Lillian Scherf; Millard Plauster; Sophia Pantazes; Theodore Ostrowski; Wayne Leverenz; Elmer Leverenz; Lorraine Fons; Alfred Cortez; Augusta Cortez

== See also ==
- United States presidential elections in Wisconsin
