= Social-Democratic Party of Wisconsin =

Defunct political party

- Founders: Victor L. Berger; Frederic Heath
- Founded: 1897
- Dissolved: 1972
- Newspaper: Wisconsin Vorwärts
- Ideology: Democratic socialism Christian socialism Sewer socialism
- Political position: Left-wing
- National affiliation: Social Democratic (1897-1901); Socialist (1901-1972)
- Regional affiliation: Farmer-Labor Progressive Federation
- Colors: Red

The Social-Democratic Party of Wisconsin (SDPW) (German: Sozialdemokratische Partei Wisconsin) also referred to as the Socialist Party of Wisconsin was established in 1897 as the Wisconsin state affiliate of the Chicago faction of the Social Democratic Party of America. When that organization merged in 1901 to form a political party known as the Socialist Party of America, the Social-Democratic Party of Wisconsin became the state affiliate of that organization, retaining its original name. For most of its 75 years, the Social-Democratic Party of Wisconsin was the state affiliate of the Socialist Party of America, established in 1901. The party was one of the largest state organizations which together comprised the Socialist Party of America.

The party was responsible for electing the first socialist member of the United States Congress and was the governing party in the city of Milwaukee for many years, electing several long-time mayors. The SDPW experienced a golden period in the 1920s and early 1930s with many electoral successes and extensive influence on state-level legislation.

== History ==
=== Historical background ===
Socialism was by no means new to Wisconsin; a fair percentage of the émigrés from Germany in the dozen years prior to the Civil War, the so-called "Forty-Eighters," had been exposed to radical ideas and been participants in a continent-wide battle against absolutist monarchy. Milwaukee was, among other things, an enclave of German-American radicalism, with some 24% of the city German born in 1895. it was there that the American Socialist movement sank deep roots.

The first socialist newspaper in Wisconsin appeared in Milwaukee in November 1875, a small sheet called Der Sozialist. The paper had a Lassallean political orientation and survived for only about one year. The first English-language paper appeared the next year, when a weekly called Social Democrat saw print. As with Der Sozialist, this paper proved to be short-lived.

Chicago radical publisher Paul Grottkau came to Milwaukee in 1886, bringing with him his newspaper, the German-language tri-weekly the Arbeiter Zeitung (Workers News). This publication continued without interruption, although undergoing a name change to the Volks Zeitung (Peoples' News), until it was sold in January 1893 to a young school teacher named Victor L. Berger and transformed into the Wisconsin Vorwärts ('Wisconsin Forward'). Berger assumed the role of both editor and publisher of the publication, and his emergence in this capacity marked a turning point in the history of the socialist movement in the state. Berger grew his paper by attempting to de-emphasize revolutionary change in favor of incremental reform, and made a conscious effort to forge alliances with the trade union movement of his city and state.

The minimum program which Berger espoused included such things as the municipal ownership of public utilities, the national ownership of mines, abolition of child labor, establishment of income and inheritance taxation, and establishment of state standards for working conditions as well as old age pensions and insurance against sickness. Additional political demands included abolition of the United States Senate and the veto power of the executive branch, and the elimination of the standing army and restrictions upon immigration. Berger's consistent advocacy of this "constructive" program began to be felt and by the end of the 1890s the Milwaukee Federated Trades Council was won over to support of the practical immediate demands espoused by Berger.

In 1901 The Social Democratic Herald, the official organ of the Chicago-based Social Democratic Party of America, moved its office to Milwaukee. This paper would continue as the English-language voice of socialism in Wisconsin through September 1913.

=== Early organizations ===
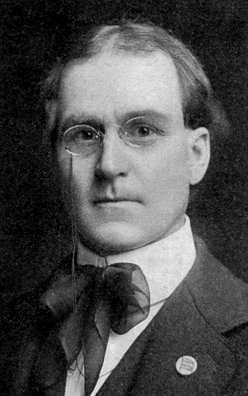
Frederic Heath, a key leader and founder of the Social-Democratic Party of Wisconsin.

Behind Milwaukee's socialist press, there was an evolving political organization. Between 1874 and 1876 there was a Milwaukee branch of the International Workingmen's Association — the so-called "First International" in which Karl Marx played no small role. Many of the members of this pioneering group, which met at a place called Casino Hall, would go on to become leading members of the Social-Democratic Party during the decade of the 1890s.

The 1877 election saw the first explicitly socialist campaign in Wisconsin, when leaflets touting a so-called "Social Democratic Ticket" were circulated among the workers of Milwaukee.

The direct forerunners of the Social-Democratic Party of Wisconsin Included the German language Sozialistischer Verein, in which Victor Berger played a leading role, and a small English-language group styling itself as the "Fabian Society," in which Frederic Heath was the most active participant. Berger's group was part of the turner movement — a network of social and gymnastic organizations established in America by emigrants from Germany.

On October 9, 1893, with a city election in Milwaukee less than a month away, members of the Sozialistischer Verein and Fabian Society gathered with individuals associated with the Socialist Labor Party of America, the People's Party ("Populists"), and unaffiliated trade unionists to decide upon a common plan of action. A committee of 15 was elected, who managed to hammer out the differing views of the various participating organizations into a coherent platform behind a set of nominees called the "Cooperative Ticket."

The alliance of reformers and radicals had no great delusions of their prospects of success, but instead sought to make their united effort at the polls a cause for building the organized strength of the working class. This alliance lasted until the summer of 1894, when the Populists severed themselves from the socialist movement by banning admission of Victor Berger and two dozen socialists as delegates to their state convention.

Relations between the socialists and the Populists continued to sour over the next several years, with Berger declaring at the time of the November 1896 elections that socialists should support the Populists at the polls only until a national political party was established for the working class.

Berger and his co-thinkers had not long to wait for such an organization. On January 2, 1897, trade union organizer and orator Eugene V. Debs announced in an open letter that he was severing himself from the increasingly conservative People's Party, owing to his conversion to Socialism. Berger had been instrumental in winning Debs to the socialist cause, visiting him with books in hand during the time of his incarceration in Woodstock Jail in Chicago in 1895, and he wrote to Debs exploring the formation of a new explicitly socialist political party. This would take shape later that same year as the Social Democracy of America, from which Berger and Debs would split in 1898 to form the electorally-oriented Social Democratic Party.

=== Establishment ===
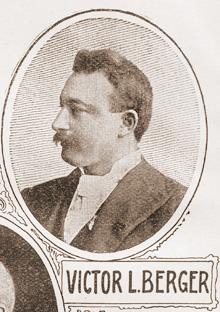
Social-Democratic Party founder and patriarch Victor L. Berger as he appeared in 1900.

On July 7, 1898, Eugene Debs made his first public speech on behalf of the Social Democracy at a meeting held at West Side Turner Hall in Milwaukee before a large and enthusiastic audience. Two nights later, Milwaukee saw the establishment of Branch 1 of the Social Democracy of America, with Debs again on hand to provide a keynote address to the session. Between 75 and 100 of the city's residents, including many German-American immigrants, turned out to help establish the new organization.

From the earliest days, left wing opposition existed to the new organization in the form of the Socialist Labor Party, which sought to debate Debs and the Social Democracy on the nature of Socialism. One historian of this interlude has intimated that such a desire for debate was natural, characterizing party leader Daniel DeLeon of the SLP and Victor Berger of the Social Democracy as "the sages behind two opposing schools of socialism."

Debs had planned to stay in Wisconsin helping to establish the Social Democracy in other cities around the state, but he was ultimately called away to the West Virginia coal fields to help organize striking miners then engaged in a heated economic battle with mine-owners.

Berger and Heath, the two leading figures in the Wisconsin movement, sought to expand the size and influence of their movement among Wisconsinites by establishing a daily newspaper, which they hoped to launch on New Year's Day, 1898. In a surprising move intended to unite the warring factions of American socialism, an offer was made to Daniel DeLeon to come to Wisconsin from New York City in order to edit the new paper. There is no evidence that DeLeon ever answered this proposal, which seems to have been made in good faith. The idea for an English daily was ultimately abandoned at this time.

The first city convention of the Social Democratics in Milwaukee was held on February 1, 1898, and included substantial representation from the Milwaukee Federated Trades Council and individual unions. The party’s first central committee consisted of Victor L. Berger (serving as chairman), Louis A. Arnold, F. Clausen, John Doerfler, Fred C. Haack, Henry Luther, Gustav Richter, James P. Sheehan, Fred Sieling, and Ed Ziegler.

An initial slate of four candidates was put forward by the organization to run in the Milwaukee municipal election which followed on April 5. Those nominated were the first of many subsequent Socialist candidates to be bound to the party program through the submission of signed-but-undated "blank resignations," which were entrusted to the party organization to be dated and submitted if the elected candidate were to ever lose the party's trust.

The electoral platform guiding these candidates has been described by one historian as one of "detailed reformism," including calls for city-owned utilities, public works projects, free textbooks for schoolchildren, and the development of recreation areas in poor sections of the city of Milwaukee.

The Social Democratic candidate for mayor, machinist Robert Meister, ultimately received 2400 votes, trailing the 26,000 ballots received by the Democratic Party's victorious nominee and the 18,000 votes for his Republican opponent.

The Social Democratic campaign was taken statewide for the first time in the fall of 1898, with a platform calling for establishment of a progressive income tax and a new property tax to replace the current system of taxation, universal suffrage for all literate adults, establishment of the initiative and referendum, abolition of the veto power of the governor, abolition of the Wisconsin State Senate, and prohibition of child labor and night work for women. This set of substantial reforms was not met with favorably by the electorate as the Social Democratic ticket generated results no better than the Milwaukee mayoral effort, polling a mere 2,544 votes in a statewide race.

=== Development ===
The Social-Democratic Party was buoyed to some extent by an onslaught against the Socialist Labor Party, an ideological battle led nationally by the Appeal to Reason, a large circulation weekly based in the rural town of Girard, Kansas. The Appeal's 1898 onslaught was followed by a split of the SLP over the question of trade union tactics in the following year. Dissatisfied former member of the SLP in Milwaukee bolted for the Social-Democratic Party, swelling its ranks and reducing the physical and rhetorical volume of its left wing opponents.

In 1900 dissident former members of the SLP and the Chicago-based Social Democratic Party managed to patch up their differences long enough to run a joint ticket for the presidency, headed by Eugene Debs for President and Job Harriman of California for Vice-President. Although the SDP leadership remained leery of the former SLP members, organizational unity eventually followed, formalized by a convention in Indianapolis which was gaveled to order on July 29, 1901. The Socialist Party of America was thereby born.

=== Electoral victories ===
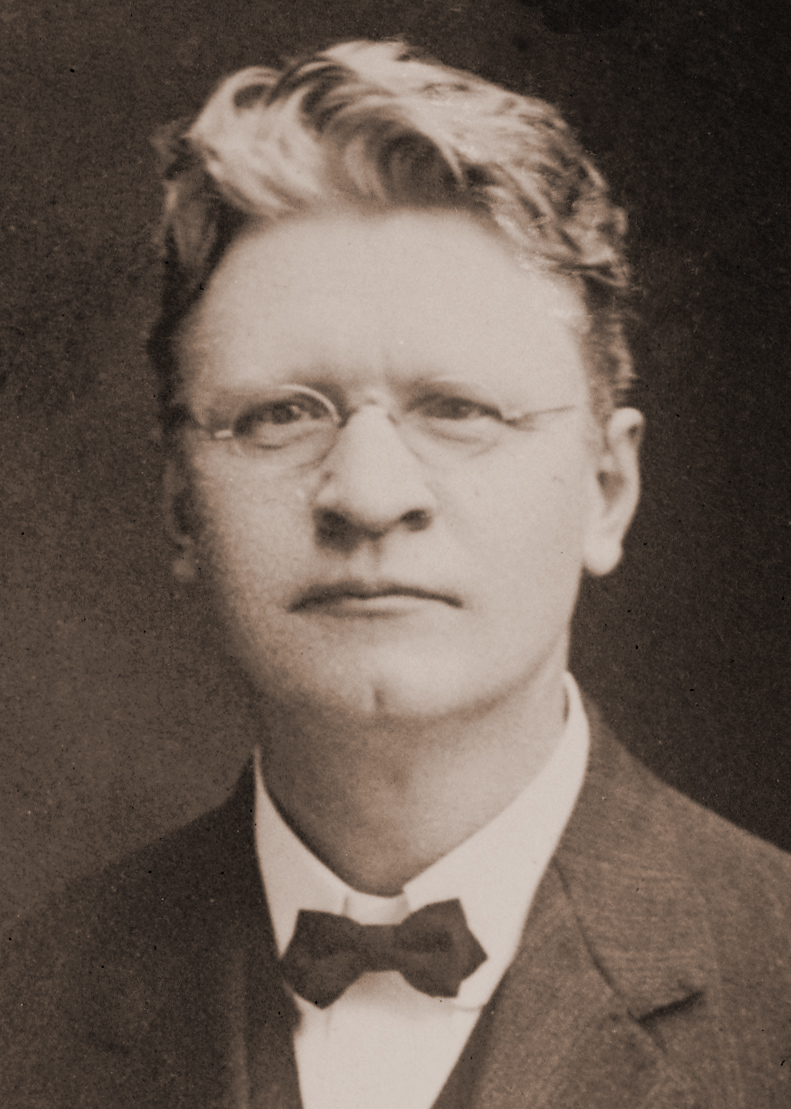
Emil Seidel, first member of the Social-Democratic Party of Wisconsin elected as the Mayor of Milwaukee.

The Social-Democratic Party of Wisconsin broke through electorally in 1904, first winning office in the Milwaukee city election in April. That successful campaign saw nearly 20,000 votes cast for the SDP, with ten party members elected as city aldermen and another four as city supervisors. In addition, two party members won positions as justices and two more as constables. Among those elected to office for the first time as incoming aldermen were pioneer English-speaking socialist Frederic Heath and future Mayor Emil Seidel. Newspaper editor Victor Berger finished third in his bid to become Mayor of Milwaukee, but he nonetheless recorded a respectable 15,343 votes (27.2% of those cast) in a three-cornered race.

Success continued in November 1904 when the party saw five of its candidates elected to the Wisconsin State Assembly and one other elected to the Wisconsin State Senate. That election also saw the first Congressional campaign of the party's patriarch, Victor Berger, when he stood for election in Wisconsin's 5th Congressional District, centered in Milwaukee. During this campaign the SDP refined its electoral tactics, dividing the distribution of campaign literature in the urban center of Milwaukee on a carefully planned block-by-block basis and managing to distribute 100,000 pieces of campaign literature, hitting every dwelling in the city, in a 24-hour period. An efficient political machine to rival those of the so-called "old parties" was thereby developed — a factor not to be underestimated in any assessment of the organization's electoral success.

The SDP scored its biggest electoral triumph to date in the spring of 1910 when Emil Seidel was elected as Mayor of Milwaukee. One key factor behind socialist success in this race was a breakthrough by the SDP among working class Polish-American voters, who had traditionally supported candidates of the Democratic Party. Seidel's victory capped a decade of steady SDP growth in Milwaukee mayoral elections, in which the party's candidates had seen the number of socialist votes cast grow by a factor of 8 between the election of 1900 and the end of the decade.

The SDP reached its electoral zenith in 1918, during World War I; in a special election to the United States Senate held in April, Congressman Victor Berger polled over 26% of the vote and won eleven counties. That November, Emil Seidel polled over 17% of the vote for Governor of Wisconsin, and for the first time the Socialists became the second-largest party in the Wisconsin Legislature, with 4 State Senators and 16 State Assemblymen. Two years later, this number dropped sharply to 4 State Senators and 6 State Assemblymen. 1922 saw the return of Victor Berger to Congress, while 3 party members were elected to the State Senate and 10 were sent to the Assembly. The party did not run a candidate for U.S. Senate that year, avoiding a race which was handily won by popular progressive Republican Robert M. La Follette, Sr. over his Democratic challenger by a margin of nearly 5-to-1.

=== Progressive fusion ===
After the death of Congressman Victor Berger in 1929, State Senator Thomas Duncan was considered his successor as leader of the Wisconsin socialists. In a controversial move, Republican Governor Philip La Follette appointed Duncan his executive secretary in 1931, and he quickly became a member of La Follette's inner circle. Duncan was seen as less doctrinaire than Berger, and in 1932 was asserted to have (unsuccessfully) led efforts to lure the Socialists into the La Follette camp. Three years later however, Duncan orchestrated the formation of the Wisconsin Farmer-Labor Progressive Federation, a coalition made up of the Progressive Party, the Socialist Party, the Farmer-Labor Progressive League, the Wisconsin State Federation of Labor, and several other labor and farmers' groups. Duncan was able to convince the socialists to give up their ballot access in exchange for reserving certain seats for socialists running under the Progressive ticket.

== Sewer Socialists ==
The SDPW was the center of what was derisively termed "Sewer Socialism" within the socialist movement: an element which favored democratic socialism over Orthodox Marxism, deemphasizing social theory and revolutionary rhetoric, in favor of honest government and efforts to improve public health. The Sewer Socialists fought to clean up what they saw as "the dirty and polluted legacy of the Industrial Revolution," cleaning up neighborhoods and factories with new sanitation systems, city-owned water and power systems, and improved education.

== Prominent members ==
=== Federal officials ===
- Victor L. Berger, U.S. Representative (1911–1913, 1919, 1923–1929)
- Andrew Biemiller, U.S. Representative (1945–1947, 1949–1951) (elected as a Democrat), Wisconsin State Assemblyman (1937–1943)

=== State officials ===
- George A. Nelson, Speaker of the Wisconsin State Assembly (1926–1927), Wisconsin State Assemblyman (1921–1927) (elected as a Republican)
- Jacob Rummel, Wisconsin State Senator (1905–1909)
- Winfield Gaylord, Wisconsin State Senator (1909–1913)
- Gabriel Zophy, Wisconsin State Senator (1911–1915)
- Louis A. Arnold, Wisconsin State Senator (1915–1923)
- W. C. Zumach, Wisconsin State Senator (1917–1921)
- Frank Raguse, Wisconsin State Senator (1917)
- Rudolph Beyer, Wisconsin State Senator (1919–1923)
- Henry Kleist, Wisconsin State Senator (1919–1923)
- Joseph J. Hirsch, Wisconsin State Senator (1921–1925)
- Walter Polakowski, Wisconsin State Senator (1923–1935), Wisconsin State Assemblyman (1921–1923)
- William F. Quick, Wisconsin State Senator (1923–1927)
- Joseph Arthur Padway, Wisconsin State Senator (1925–1926)
- Alex C. Ruffing, Wisconsin State Senator (1927–1929), Wisconsin State Assemblyman (1919–1927)
- Thomas Duncan, Wisconsin State Senator (1929–1933), Wisconsin State Assemblyman (1923–1929)
- Anton M. Miller, Wisconsin State Senator (1929–1933), Wisconsin State Assemblyman (1921–1929) (elected as a Republican)
- George Hampel, Wisconsin State Senator (1937–1945), Wisconsin State Assemblyman (1931–1933)
- Charles D. Madsen, Wisconsin State Senator (1943–1951) (elected as a Progressive)
- William Alldridge, Wisconsin State Assemblyman (1905–1909)
- Edmund J. Berner, Wisconsin State Assemblyman (1905–1913)
- Frederick Brockhausen, Wisconsin State Assemblyman (1905–1913)
- August W. Strehlow, Wisconsin State Assemblyman (1905–1907)
- Carl D. Thompson, Wisconsin State Assemblyman (1907–1909)
- Frank J. Weber, Wisconsin State Assemblyman (1907–1911, 1915–1917, 1923–1927)
- W. J. Gilboy, Wisconsin State Assemblyman (1911–1913)
- Frank Metcalfe, Wisconsin State Assemblyman (1911–1913, 1915–1921)
- Jacob Hahn, Wisconsin State Assemblyman (1911–1913)
- James Vint, Wisconsin State Assemblyman (1911–1917), Commissioner of the Wisconsin Department of Markets (1927–1929)
- Arthur Kahn, Wisconsin State Assemblyman (1911–1913)
- Max E. Binner, Wisconsin State Assemblyman (1911–1913)
- George Klenzendorff, Wisconsin State Assemblyman (1911–1913)
- Michael Katzban, Wisconsin State Assemblyman (1911–1913)
- Edward H. Kiefer, Wisconsin State Assemblyman (1911–1915, 1931–1941)
- Carl Minkley, Wisconsin State Assemblyman (1913–1917)
- Edward Zinn, Wisconsin State Assemblyman (1913–1917)
- William L. Smith, Wisconsin State Assemblyman (1913–1919)
- Martin Gorecki, Wisconsin State Assemblyman (1913–1915)
- Herman O. Kent, Wisconsin State Assemblyman (1915–1919)
- George L. Tews, Wisconsin State Assemblyman (1915–1917, 1927–1929, 1931–1933)
- Henry Ohl Jr., Wisconsin State Assemblyman (1917–1919)
- Gilbert Poor, Wisconsin State Assemblyman (1917–1919)
- Glenn P. Turner, Wisconsin State Assemblyman (1917–1919)
- William E. Jordan, Wisconsin State Assemblyman (1917–1923)
- Herman Marth, Wisconsin State Assemblyman (1918–1921)
- Otto Lerche, Wisconsin State Assemblyman (1919–1921)
- Herman Roethel, Wisconsin State Assemblyman (1919–1921, 1927–1929)
- Charles Zarnke, Wisconsin State Assemblyman (1919–1921)
- Joseph Klein, Wisconsin State Assemblyman (1919–1921)
- Albert Ehlman, Wisconsin State Assemblyman (1919–1921)
- Henry Sievers, Wisconsin State Assemblyman (1919–1921)
- Julius Kiesner, Wisconsin State Assemblyman (1919–1929)
- Edwin Knappe, Wisconsin State Assemblyman (1919–1921)
- John M. Sell, Wisconsin State Assemblyman (1919–1921)
- John Masiakowski, Wisconsin State Assemblyman (1919–1921)
- Frank X. Bauer, Wisconsin State Assemblyman (1919–1921)
- Charles Burhop, Wisconsin State Assemblyman (1919–1921)
- Fred Hasley, Wisconsin State Assemblyman (1921–1923)
- Stephen Stolowski, Wisconsin State Assemblyman (1921–1923)
- H. G. Tucker, Wisconsin State Assemblyman (1923–1925)
- John Polakowski, Wisconsin State Assemblyman (1923–1925)
- Olaf C. Olsen, Wisconsin State Assemblyman (1923–1927)
- Richard Elsner, Wisconsin State Assemblyman (1923–1925)
- George Gauer, Wisconsin State Assemblyman (1923–1925, 1927–1929)
- Albert F. Woller, Wisconsin State Assemblyman (1923–1925, 1927–1931)
- Frank Cieszynski, Wisconsin State Assemblyman (1925–1927)
- William Coleman, Wisconsin State Assemblyman (1925–1929)
- Philip Wenz, Wisconsin State Assemblyman (1927–1933)
- Elmer Baumann, Wisconsin State Assemblyman (1927–1929)
- Otto Kehrein, Wisconsin State Assemblyman (1929–1933)
- Emil Meyer, Wisconsin State Assemblyman (1931–1933)
- John Ermenc, Wisconsin State Assemblyman (1931–1933)
- Ben Rubin, Wisconsin State Assemblyman (1931–1933, 1937–1942)
- Marshall Reckard, Wisconsin State Assemblyman (1931–1933)
- Arthur Koegel, Wisconsin State Assemblyman (1933–1943)
- Herman B. Wegner, Wisconsin State Assemblyman (1933–1945)
- Henry J. Berquist, Wisconsin State Assemblyman (1937–1942) (elected as a Progressive)
- Clement Stachowiak, Wisconsin State Assemblyman (1939–1941) (elected as a Progressive)

=== Local officials ===
- Emil Seidel, Mayor of Milwaukee (1910–1912)
- Daniel Hoan, Mayor of Milwaukee (1916–1940)
- Frank Zeidler, Mayor of Milwaukee (1948–1960)
- Winfred C. Zabel, Milwaukee County District Attorney (1911–1923, 1933–1936)
- Max Raskin, Milwaukee City Attorney (1932–1936)
- Charles B. Whitnall, Milwaukee City Treasurer (1910–1912)
- William A. Arnold, Milwaukee County Sheriff (1911–1914)
- Edmund T. Melms, Milwaukee County Sheriff (1915–1917)
- Robert Buech, Milwaukee County Sheriff (1919–1920)
- Fred C. Haack, Sheboygan Alderman (1897–1916), first member of the Social Democratic Party to hold public office in the United States
- Leo Krzycki, Milwaukee Alderman (1912–1916)
- Meta Berger, Milwaukee School Director (1909–1939)
- Frederic Heath, Milwaukee County Supervisor (1910–1948)
- James P. Sheehan, Milwaukee County Supervisor (1904–1906, 1908–1912, 1914–1936)
- George W. Lippert, Marathon County District Attorney (1918–1920, 1922–1924)
- Emil Tesch, Marathon County Sheriff (1918–?)
- Frank Damrow, Marathon County Treasurer (1918–?)
- Charles A. Born, Mayor of Sheboygan (1903–1904)
- James Larson, Mayor of Marinette (1911)
- Henry Stolze Jr., Mayor of Manitowoc (1911)
- David Love, Mayor of West Allis (1916)
- William Swoboda, Mayor of Racine (1931–1932)

=== Other members ===
- Oscar Ameringer
- Moses Hull
- John C. Kleist
- David J. Saposs
- A. M. Simons
- Ernest Untermann
- John M. Work

== Party Press ==
=== Milwaukee ===
- Milwaukee Arbeiter Zeitung [Milwaukee Workers’ Newspaper] (1886–1893) — Tri-weekly, published previously in Chicago.
  - Wisconsin Vorwärts [Wisconsin Forward] (1893–??) — Edited by Victor Berger.
  - Die Wahrheit [The Truth] (1893–1910) — Edited by Victor Berger.
- Social Democratic Herald (1901–Sep. 1913) — Weekly, published previously in Terre Haute and Chicago.
- The Vanguard (1900s) — Monthly theoretical magazine.
- Milwaukee Leader (Dec. 1911–1940s)
- Wisconsin Comrade (1914–May 1916) — Monthly members’ bulletin.
  - The Coming Nation (June 1916–March 1917)

== See also ==
- Social Democratic Party of Germany
- Socialist Party of Minnesota
- Socialist Party of Missouri
- Socialist Party of North Dakota
- Socialist Party of Oklahoma
- Socialist Party of Oregon
- Socialist Party of Washington

== Publications ==
- Louis A. Arnold, Men of Wisconsin: They Have Silenced the Voice of Freedom But Votes Speak Louder than Words: Let Your Answer Be Victor L. Berger for US Senator (Socialist Ticket). Milwaukee: Louis A. Arnold, n.d. (1918).
- Victor L. Berger, "A 'Dissolved' Trust," The Vanguard, vol. 5, no. 10, whole no. 54. Milwaukee: Social-Democratic Publishing Co., 1907.
  - Berger's Broadsides. Milwaukee: Social-Democratic Publishing Co., 1912.
  - Voice and Pen of Victor L. Berger: Congressional Speeches and Editorials. Milwaukee: Milwaukee Leader, 1929.
- Winfield R. Gaylord, County Option: Where Labor Stands at Present on the Liquor Question: Address Delivered in the Debate on County Option in the Wisconsin Legislature, March 31st, 1909. Milwaukee: Social-Democratic Publishing Co., n.d. (1909).
- Daniel W. Hoan, Inaugural Address of Daniel W. Hoan, Mayor of Milwaukee: Delivered to the Common Council of Milwaukee, Wis., April 16, 1918. Milwaukee: n.p., n.d. (1918).
- Ralph Korngold, Brain Jolters. Milwaukee: Milwaukee Social-Democratic Publishing Co., n.d. (c. 1914).
- Paul Porter, Which Way for the Socialist Party? Milwaukee: State Executive Board, Socialist Party of Wisconsin, 1937.
- Emil Seidel, Which Must Go? America or Private Ownership of Railroads? Milwaukee: Socialist Party of Wisconsin, n.d. (c. 1920).
- Norman Thomas, Collective Security and War. Milwaukee: Socialist Party of Wisconsin, 1938.
- Carl D. Thompson, Ferdinand Rehfeld, and Max Grass (eds.), Milwaukee Municipal Campaign Book 1912, Social-Democratic Party. Milwaukee: County Central Committee of the Social-Democratic Party, Milwaukee County, Wis., 1912.
- R.W. Tucker, The Debs Caucus: A Party Within a Party. Milwaukee: Socialist Party of Wisconsin, 1970.
- Some Anti-Socialist Voices of the Press on Victor L. Berger, Representative of the Fifth Wisconsin District, and his Work in Congress. Milwaukee: Social-Democratic Publishing Co., n.d. (c. 1912).
- Socialist Party of Wisconsin, Wisconsin Socialist Platform, 1918. Milwaukee Leader, vol. 7, no. 337 (Aug. 31, 1918), pg. 8.
- Carl D. Thompson, Municipal Campaign Book, 1912. Milwaukee County Central Committee of the Social-Democratic Party of Wisconsin, 1912.

== SDPW average paid memberships ==
Year	Average Paid Membership	Exempt Members	National SPA Membership
1901		n/a	4,759 paid (of 7,629)
1902	370	n/a	9,949
1903		n/a	15,975
1904		n/a	20,763
1905		n/a	23,327
1906		n/a	26,784
1907		n/a	29,270
1908		n/a	41,751
1909	1,831	n/a	41,470
1910		n/a	58,011
1911		n/a	84,716
1912		n/a	118,045
1913			95,957
1914			93,579
1915			79,374
1916	3,092		83,284
1917	3,694		80,379
1918	5,160 (first 6 mos.)		82,344
1919			104,822
1920			26,766
1921			13,484
1922			11,019
1923			10,662
1924			10,125
1925			8,558
1926			8,392
1927			7,425
1928			7,793
1929			9,560
1930			9,736
1931			10,389
1932			16,863
1933			18,548
1934			20,951
1935			19,121
1936			11,922

Sources: Carl D. Thompson, "The Rising Tide of Socialism," The Socialist (Columbus, OH), Aug. 12, 1911, pg. 2; St. Louis Labor, Feb. 22, 1902, pg. 5; "Dues Paid Last Year," The Worker, March 22, 1903, pg. 4; Socialist Party Official Bulletin and successors, Executive Secretary state-by-state membership summaries, January issues;"Socialist Party Official Membership Series,' (1932). Report to 1937 Convention, cited in "Socialist Party of America Annual Membership Figures," Early American Marxism website. Adoloph Germer, Report of Executive Secretary to the National Executive Committee: Chicago, Illinois — Aug. 8, 1918, pp. 5-6. "Exempt" members denote those receiving special dispensation from the state office due to unemployment starting 1913. 1909 figure from Socialist Party Official Bulletin, April 1910, pg. 10.
