= 1952 United States presidential election in Wisconsin =

- November 4, 1952

Nominee	Dwight D. Eisenhower	Adlai Stevenson
Party	Republican	Democratic
Home state	New York	Illinois
Running mate	Richard Nixon	John Sparkman
Electoral vote	12	0
Popular vote	979,744	622,175
Percentage	60.95%	38.71%
County results
Eisenhower
50–60%
60–70%
70–80%
80–90%
Stevenson
50–60%
60–70%
President before election
Harry S. Truman
Democratic
Elected President
Dwight D. Eisenhower
Republican

The 1952 United States presidential election in Wisconsin was held on November 4, 1952, as part of the 1952 United States presidential election. State voters chose 12 electors to the Electoral College, who voted for president and vice president.

Politics in Wisconsin since the Populist movement had been dominated by the Republican Party. The Democratic Party became uncompetitive away from the Laue Michigan coast as the upper classes, along with the majority of workers who followed them, fled from William Jennings Bryan's agrarian and free silver sympathies. Although the state did develop a strong Social-Democratic Party to provide opposition to the GOP, Wisconsin developed the direct Republican primary in 1903 and this ultimately created competition between the "League" under Robert M. La Follette, and the conservative "Regular" faction. This ultimately would develop into the Wisconsin Progressive Party in the late 1930s, which was opposed to the conservative German Democrats and to the national Republican Party, and allied with Franklin D. Roosevelt at the federal level.

During the two wartime elections, the formerly Democratic German counties in the east of the state – which had been powerfully opposed to the Civil War because they saw it as a "Yankee" war and opposed the military draft instituted during it – viewed Communism as a much greater threat to America than Nazism and consequently opposed President Roosevelt's war effort. Consequently, these historically Democratic counties became virtually the most Republican in the entire state, and with the fall of the Progressive Party that had provided the main opposition to the Republicans in the 1930s, the state sent an all-Republican congressional delegation to the 80th Congress for the first time since the 71st, and Democratic representation in the state legislature reached the lowest level since that same date, although it improved to a quarter of the state House in 1950.

During the second term of now-unpopular President Truman, populist conservative Wisconsin Senator Joe McCarthy became notorious for his investigations into Communists inside the American government. It was thought that he would be a hindrance both to Democratic nominee Adlai Stevenson II, and to Republican nominee Dwight D. Eisenhower. Stevenson would call for McCarthy's defeat during his campaign in the state because he thought Eisenhower was using unfair political tactics, that Eisenhower was a "scaremonger", and that the Republican Party was the "Same Old Political Hokum".

Polls in the state during the third week of October showed that most voters were for Eisenhower, although it was thought Stevenson was gaining. The poll however said that if Stevenson was to carry Wisconsin he would be required to win over a large majority of undecided voters. The probability of Stevenson achieving this was made more remote by a poll near the end of October that showed him trailing Eisenhower amongst Wisconsin's farmers by a two-to-one margin.

== Results ==
1952 United States presidential election in Wisconsin
Party	Candidate	Votes	Percentage	Electoral votes
Republican	Dwight D. Eisenhower	979,744	60.95%	12
Democratic	Adlai Stevenson	622,175	38.71%	0
Independent Progressive	Vincent Hallinan	2,174	0.14%	0
Independent Socialist Workers	Farrell Dobbs	1,350	0.08%	0
Independent Social-Democratic	Darlington Hoopes	1,157	0.07%	0
Independent Socialist Labor	Eric Hass	770	0.05%	0
Totals		1,607,370	100.00%	12

=== Results by county ===
County	Dwight D. Eisenhower Republican		Adlai Stevenson Democratic		Other candidates Various parties		Margin		Total votes cast
County	#	%	#	%	#	%	#	%	Total votes cast
Adams	2,259	65.35%	1,180	34.13%	18	0.52%	1,079	31.22%	3,457
Ashland	4,451	53.50%	3,828	46.01%	41	0.49%	623	7.49%	8,320
Barron	10,013	66.84%	4,902	32.72%	66	0.44%	5,111	34.12%	14,981
Bayfield	3,419	55.98%	2,616	42.84%	72	1.18%	803	13.14%	6,107
Brown	30,400	67.80%	14,342	31.99%	94	0.21%	16,058	35.81%	44,836
Buffalo	4,233	67.92%	1,988	31.90%	11	0.18%	2,245	36.02%	6,232
Burnett	2,683	60.43%	1,741	39.21%	16	0.36%	942	21.22%	4,440
Calumet	6,640	77.07%	1,970	22.87%	5	0.06%	4,670	54.20%	8,615
Chippewa	11,429	64.01%	6,380	35.73%	45	0.25%	5,049	28.28%	17,854
Clark	9,406	71.71%	3,652	27.84%	58	0.44%	5,754	43.87%	13,116
Columbia	11,133	67.78%	5,272	32.10%	20	0.12%	5,861	35.68%	16,425
Crawford	5,323	70.15%	2,256	29.73%	9	0.12%	3,067	40.42%	7,588
Dane	38,724	50.34%	37,987	49.38%	216	0.28%	737	0.96%	76,927
Dodge	19,298	73.28%	7,001	26.58%	37	0.14%	12,297	46.70%	26,336
Door	7,621	80.82%	1,790	18.98%	19	0.20%	5,831	61.84%	9,430
Douglas	9,677	45.40%	11,538	54.14%	98	0.46%	-1,861	-8.74%	21,313
Dunn	7,475	67.38%	3,593	32.39%	26	0.23%	3,882	34.99%	11,094
Eau Claire	14,069	59.47%	9,554	40.38%	35	0.15%	4,515	19.09%	23,658
Florence	1,147	58.43%	809	41.21%	7	0.36%	338	17.22%	1,963
Fond du Lac	22,794	74.43%	7,724	25.22%	107	0.35%	15,070	49.21%	30,625
Forest	1,990	52.47%	1,791	47.22%	12	0.32%	199	5.25%	3,793
Grant	14,327	77.21%	4,197	22.62%	32	0.17%	10,130	54.59%	18,556
Green	7,949	70.46%	3,326	29.48%	6	0.05%	4,623	40.98%	11,281
Green Lake	6,117	79.27%	1,590	20.60%	10	0.13%	4,527	58.67%	7,717
Iowa	6,211	69.38%	2,722	30.41%	19	0.21%	3,489	38.97%	8,952
Iron	1,733	39.24%	2,662	60.28%	21	0.48%	-929	-21.04%	4,416
Jackson	4,235	59.89%	2,819	39.87%	17	0.24%	1,416	20.02%	7,071
Jefferson	13,884	66.93%	6,827	32.91%	32	0.15%	7,057	34.02%	20,743
Juneau	5,978	73.22%	2,163	26.49%	23	0.28%	3,815	46.73%	8,164
Kenosha	18,917	48.72%	19,768	50.91%	142	0.37%	-851	-2.19%	38,827
Kewaunee	6,482	76.42%	1,972	23.25%	28	0.33%	4,510	53.17%	8,482
La Crosse	19,271	61.90%	11,808	37.93%	53	0.17%	7,463	23.97%	31,132
Lafayette	5,731	66.23%	2,905	33.57%	17	0.20%	2,826	32.66%	8,653
Langlade	5,841	63.02%	3,371	36.37%	57	0.61%	2,470	26.65%	9,269
Lincoln	6,877	68.72%	3,092	30.90%	38	0.38%	3,785	37.82%	10,007
Manitowoc	18,950	61.32%	11,879	38.44%	72	0.23%	7,071	22.88%	30,901
Marathon	20,702	58.52%	14,541	41.11%	130	0.37%	6,161	17.41%	35,373
Marinette	9,313	61.73%	5,727	37.96%	47	0.31%	3,586	23.77%	15,087
Marquette	3,379	80.11%	835	19.80%	4	0.09%	2,544	60.31%	4,218
Milwaukee	219,477	51.52%	204,474	48.00%	2,055	0.48%	15,003	3.52%	426,006
Monroe	8,744	69.98%	3,717	29.75%	34	0.27%	5,027	40.23%	12,495
Oconto	7,807	69.58%	3,382	30.14%	31	0.28%	4,425	39.44%	11,220
Oneida	6,224	61.86%	3,808	37.85%	30	0.30%	2,416	24.01%	10,062
Outagamie	26,603	73.86%	9,373	26.02%	44	0.12%	17,230	47.84%	36,020
Ozaukee	8,665	66.97%	4,241	32.78%	33	0.26%	4,424	34.19%	12,939
Pepin	2,348	72.14%	896	27.53%	11	0.34%	1,452	44.61%	3,255
Pierce	6,763	67.49%	3,241	32.34%	17	0.17%	3,522	35.15%	10,021
Polk	6,966	61.74%	4,274	37.88%	42	0.37%	2,692	23.86%	11,282
Portage	8,499	52.83%	7,537	46.85%	51	0.32%	962	5.98%	16,087
Price	4,376	58.42%	3,048	40.69%	67	0.89%	1,328	17.73%	7,491
Racine	30,628	54.65%	25,241	45.03%	180	0.32%	5,387	9.62%	56,049
Richland	6,605	74.42%	2,260	25.46%	10	0.11%	4,345	48.96%	8,875
Rock	27,837	64.64%	15,183	35.26%	45	0.10%	12,654	29.38%	43,065
Rusk	4,134	59.36%	2,777	39.88%	53	0.76%	1,357	19.48%	6,964
Sauk	12,347	69.89%	5,267	29.81%	52	0.29%	7,080	40.08%	17,666
Sawyer	3,146	67.02%	1,527	32.53%	21	0.45%	1,619	34.49%	4,694
Shawano	11,131	76.76%	3,334	22.99%	36	0.25%	7,797	53.77%	14,501
Sheboygan	22,084	59.00%	15,136	40.44%	212	0.57%	6,948	18.56%	37,432
St. Croix	7,607	59.78%	5,094	40.03%	25	0.20%	2,513	19.75%	12,726
Taylor	4,892	63.45%	2,768	35.90%	50	0.65%	2,124	27.55%	7,710
Trempealeau	6,501	61.63%	4,021	38.12%	26	0.25%	2,480	23.51%	10,548
Vernon	7,619	65.33%	4,032	34.57%	12	0.10%	3,587	30.76%	11,663
Vilas	3,687	70.85%	1,497	28.77%	20	0.38%	2,190	42.08%	5,204
Walworth	16,906	75.57%	5,417	24.21%	49	0.22%	11,489	51.36%	22,372
Washburn	3,184	60.80%	2,039	38.93%	14	0.27%	1,145	21.87%	5,237
Washington	12,626	73.84%	4,440	25.96%	34	0.20%	8,186	47.88%	17,100
Waukesha	30,238	65.58%	15,756	34.17%	117	0.25%	14,482	31.41%	46,111
Waupaca	13,693	81.38%	3,105	18.45%	28	0.17%	10,588	62.93%	16,826
Waushara	5,447	81.14%	1,242	18.50%	24	0.36%	4,205	62.64%	6,713
Winnebago	28,172	68.17%	13,016	31.49%	140	0.34%	15,156	36.68%	41,328
Wood	14,707	67.62%	6,914	31.79%	128	0.59%	7,793	35.83%	21,749
Totals	979,744	60.95%	622,175	38.71%	5,451	0.34%	357,569	22.24%	1,607,370

==== Counties that flipped from Democratic to Republican ====
- Adams
- Ashland
- Barron
- Bayfield
- Brown
- Buffalo
- Burnett
- Chippewa
- Crawford
- Dane
- Dunn
- Eau Claire
- Florence
- Forest
- Iowa
- Jackson
- La Crosse
- Lafayette
- Langlade
- Manitowoc
- Marathon
- Marinette
- Milwaukee
- Oneida
- Pepin
- Pierce
- Polk
- Portage
- Price
- Racine
- Rusk
- Sheboygan
- St. Croix
- Taylor
- Trempealeau
- Vernon
- Washburn

=== Electors ===
These were the names of the electors on each ticket.

Dwight D. Eisenhower & Richard M. Nixon Republican Party	Adlai Stevenson & John Sparkman Democratic Party	Vincent Hallinan & Charlotta Bass Progressive Party	Farrell Dobbs & Myra Tanner Weiss Socialist Workers Party	Darlington Hoopes & Samuel H. Friedman Social-Democratic Party	Eric Hass & Stephen Emery Socialist Labor Party
Walter J. Kohler; Vernon W. Thomson; George R. Fuller; Hermann Eisner; Donald C. McDowell; John C. Brophy; Charles D. Ashley; Carl Steiger; Max Stieg; Alfred A. Laun Jr.; Grant J. Paul; Paul J. Rogan	Jerome F. Fox; John G. Green; Arnie W. Agnew; Ruth B. Doyle; Edna Bowen; Robert A. Dejewski; Henry S. Reuss; James J. Dillman; John H. Mills; John J. Brogan; Esther P. Lederer; Joseph Szumowski	J. W. Anderson; Erwin Bonlender; Herbert H. Fisher; Bertha Franklin; Alvina Hayman; Stanley Jones; Warren Pecore; Wayne Peltola; Donald A. Rasmussen; Lois Walker; Milous W. Walker; Ralph Washington	John Adams; James E. Boulton; Kenneth Boulton; Shirley Conell; Lorraine Fons; Richard K. Kujoth; John Potzner; Francis X. Shepherd; Raymond C. Shepherd; Robert Stein; Betsy M. Stergar; Allan Wickboldt	Walter Benson; Rudolph Beyer; Anna Mae Davis; Marguerite Habelman; Ruth Hart; George Helberg; Fred Kneevers; Ervin A. Koth; Clifford T. McCarthy; Herbert J. Meltzer; John A. Pearson; Lee Schaal	Frank Brlas; Marko Golubich; Matthew Karlovich; William Kelenic; Anthony Kolosso; Louis Myler; Rudolph Prosen; Sebastian Rack; Alex Schaufelberger; Ferdinand Schnarsky; Arthur Wepfer; Adolf Wiggert

== Analysis ==
As it turned out, Eisenhower nearly matched the poll of farmers a week before the election, carrying Wisconsin by 22.25 points for the best Republican performance in the state since Warren G. Harding carried the state in 1920. Eisenhower carried all but three counties – Kenosha in the urban far south and the two Scandinavian unionized mining and industrial counties of Douglas and Iron. His large victory was due to the unpopularity of the Korean War in a traditionally isolationist state, to the ongoing fear of Communist subversion in those German Catholic regions that had turned against the Democrats during the 1940s, and to solid traditional Yankee support in the southern interior. Eisenhower was also the first Republican since Warren G. Harding in 1920 to win Portage County.

== See also ==
- United States presidential elections in Wisconsin
