= Clarence W. Watson =

American politician

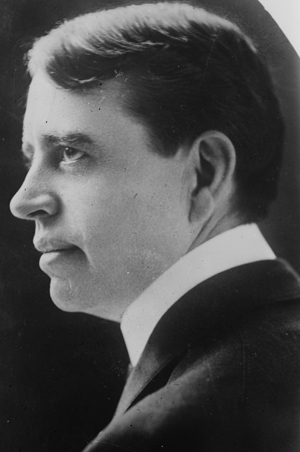

United States Senator from West Virginia
- In office February 1, 1911 – March 3, 1913
- Preceded by: Davis Elkins
- Succeeded by: Nathan Goff, Jr.

Personal details
- Born: May 8, 1864 Fairmont, West Virginia
- Died: May 24, 1940 (aged 76) Cincinnati, Ohio
- Party: Democratic

Clarence Wayland Watson (May 8, 1864 – May 24, 1940) was a coal mining "baron" from West Virginia. Watson organized several coal companies that became the Consolidation Coal and Mining Companies in West Virginia, Maryland, Pennsylvania, and Kentucky. Watson was president of the company until 1911, then became its chairman. Later in life, he became President of Elk Horn Coal Company and served as trustee of various corporations, railroads, and banks across the United States.

Watson was also elected as a Senator from West Virginia to the United States Senate to fill the vacancy caused by the death of Senator Stephen B. Elkins, serving from 1911 to 1913. During World War I he served in the United States Army as a Lieutenant Colonel in the Ordnance Department, and served in France from 1918 to 1919. While in France he received a nomination for re-election to his Senate seat, but lost the election. He lived in Fairmont in Marion County, on his family's homestead, an estate named Fairmont Farms, where he bred horses.

== Biography ==
=== Politics ===
A Democrat, he served as United States Senator from West Virginia from 1911 to 1913 after Stephen B. Elkins died in office. In March 1918, Watson was commissioned a lieutenant colonel in the Ordnance Department of the United States Army and served with the American Expeditionary Forces in France until January 1919. In 1918, while overseas, he was once again nominated as a candidate for the U.S. Senate from West Virginia, but lost the election.

=== Horses ===
He lived in Fairmont in Marion County, on his family's homestead, an estate named Fairmont Farms, where he bred horses. His show horses (including the well-regarded Lord Baltimore) won numerous awards both in the United States and in Europe. They also competed in the Bay Shore Horse Show Association at Oakwood Driving Park, Bay Shore, New York.

=== Personal life ===
He was married to Minnie Owings Watson of Ellicott City, Maryland, whose portrait hangs in the ballroom of the Governor's Mansion in Charleston, West Virginia. They also maintained residences in New York City (where Rockefeller Center now stands) and in Baltimore.

He died in Cincinnati, Ohio, while tending to Elk Horn Coal Company business, and is buried at Woodlawn Cemetery in Fairmont.

Party political offices
First	Democratic nominee for U.S. Senator from West Virginia (Class 1); 1918	Succeeded by William E. Chilton
U.S. Senate
Preceded by Davis Elkins	Class 2 Senator from West Virginia; 1911–1913	Succeeded by Nathan Goff, Jr.
