= Herman Georgi =

American politician

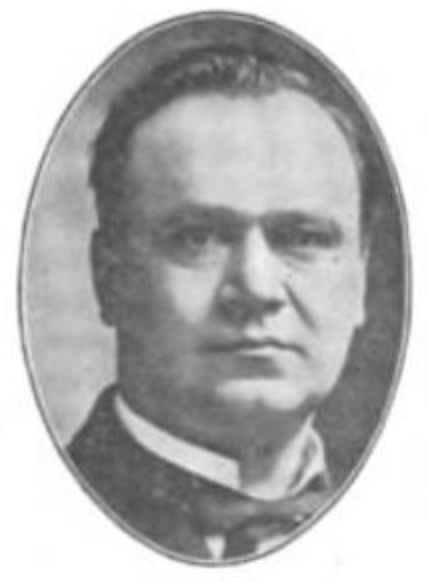

Member of the Wisconsin State Assembly
- In office 1906–1910
- Constituency: Milwaukee County Tenth District

Personal details
- Born: Herman Emil Georgi; June 16, 1870 Milwaukee, Wisconsin
- Died: 1939 Milwaukee, WI
- Resting place: Forest Home Cemetery, Milwaukee, WI
- Party: Republican
- Spouse: Ottilie Memmler (m. 1904)
- Occupation: Teacher, lawyer, politician

Herman Emil Georgi (June 16, 1870 - 1939) was an American schoolteacher, lawyer and Republican politician who served two terms as a member of the Wisconsin State Assembly from Milwaukee, Wisconsin, representing the 10th Milwaukee County district (the 10th Ward of the City of Milwaukee).

== Background and career ==
Georgi was born on June 16, 1870, in Milwaukee, was educated in the Milwaukee Public Schools, taught school and attended the University of Wisconsin–Madison, graduating from it in June 1891, and took up the practice of law in his native city. In November 1904, he married Ottilie "Tillie" Memmler. They had 2 sons, Carl Georgi in 1906 and Richard Georgi in 1919.

== Legislative service ==
He was first elected to the Assembly in 1906, with 1,221 votes to 1,004 for the Socialist George Mensing, succeeding fellow Republican Louis Metzler. Georgi was re-elected in 1908 by only nine votes, with 1,219 votes to 1,210 for the Socialist William Coleman and 896 for the Democrat William A. Aschman.

He did not run for re-election in 1910, and was succeeded by the Socialist Arthur Kahn.

== Later life ==
Georgi was still listed as practicing law in Milwaukee in the 1928 edition of Martindale's American Law Directory.
