= Guy D. Goff =

American lawyer and politician (1866–1933)

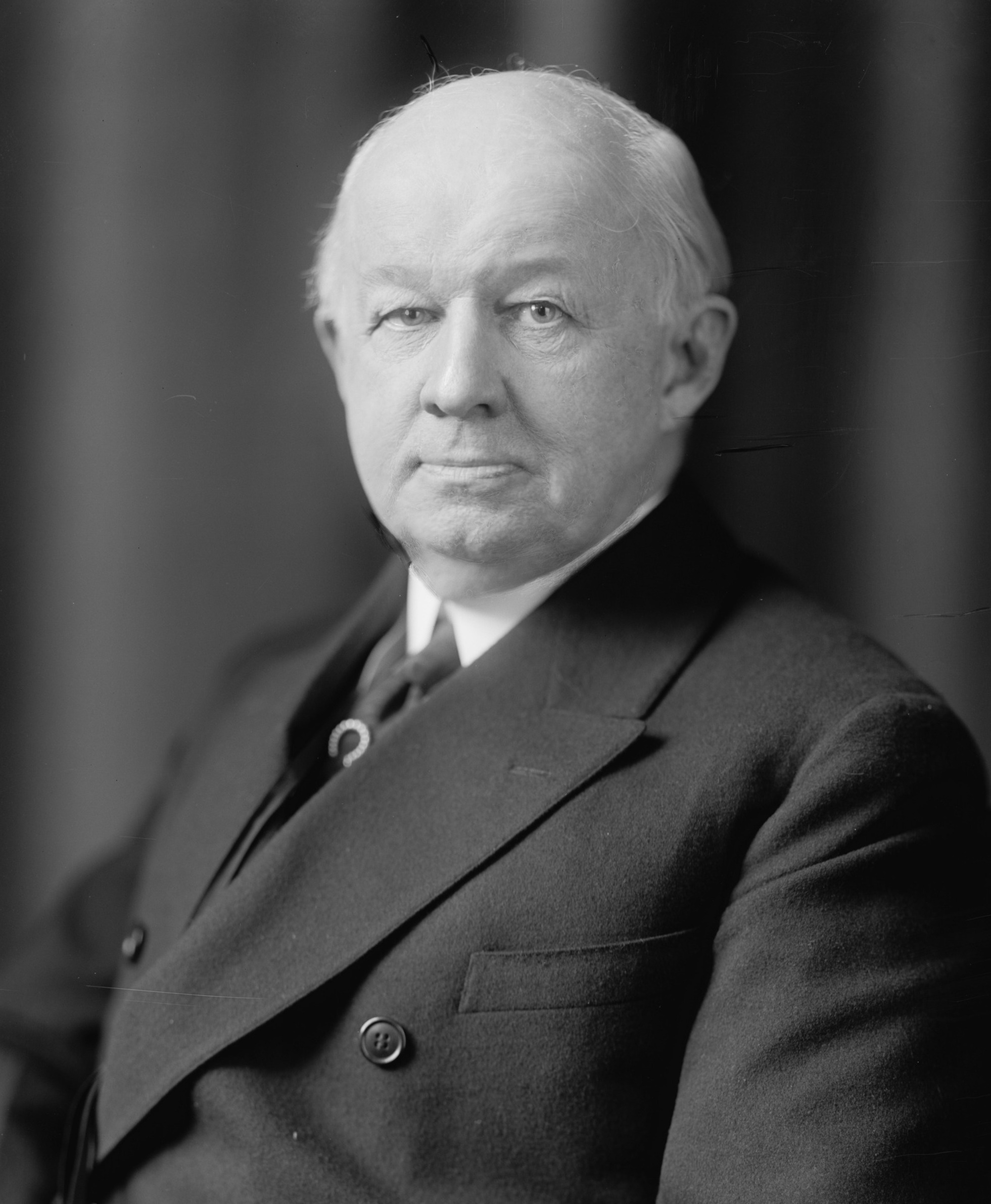
- Goff, c. 1925–1931

United States Senator from West Virginia
- In office March 4, 1925 – March 3, 1931
- Preceded by: Davis Elkins
- Succeeded by: Matthew M. Neely

United States Attorney for the Eastern District of Wisconsin
- In office 1911–1915
- President: William Howard Taft; Woodrow Wilson
- Preceded by: E. A. Henning
- Succeeded by: H. A. Sawyer

Personal details
- Born: Guy Despard Goff; September 13, 1866 Clarksburg, West Virginia
- Died: January 7, 1933 (aged 66) Thomasville, Georgia
- Resting place: Arlington National Cemetery
- Party: Republican
- Spouses: Mari Louise Van Nortwick; (m. 1897; died 1905); Anne May Baker; (died 1950)
- Children: Louise Goff Reece; (b. 1898; died 1970)
- Parents: Nathan Goff (father); Laura Ellen (Despard) Goff (mother)

Military service
- Allegiance: United States
- Branch/service: United States Army
- Years of service: 1918–1919
- Rank: Colonel
- Unit: Judge Advocate General's Corps
- Battles/wars: World War I

Guy Despard Goff (September 13, 1866 – January 7, 1933) was an American lawyer and politician who served as a United States senator from West Virginia. Earlier in his career, he was United States Attorney for the Eastern District of Wisconsin and served in various roles in the United States Department of Justice.

== Life and career ==
Goff was a member of the political dynasty established by his father Nathan Goff, also a U.S. Senator from West Virginia. Born in Clarksburg, West Virginia, he attended the common schools and the College of William and Mary. He graduated from Kenyon College (in Gambier, Ohio) in 1888 and from the law department of Harvard University in 1891; he was admitted to the bar the same year and commenced practice in Boston, Massachusetts.

In 1893 he moved to Milwaukee, Wisconsin, and continued the practice of law; he was elected prosecuting attorney of Milwaukee County in 1895, ran for mayor in 1904 and, in 1911, he was appointed United States Attorney for the Eastern District of Wisconsin by President William Howard Taft. He served two years into the presidency of Woodrow Wilson, leaving office in 1915. Goff was appointed special assistant to the Attorney General of the United States in 1917, and, during World War I, he was commissioned a colonel in the Judge Advocate General's Department of the United States Army and served in France and Germany in 1918-1919.

Goff was appointed by President Woodrow Wilson as general counsel of the United States Shipping Board in 1920 and later became a member, serving until 1921; he was appointed an assistant to the Attorney General on several occasions from 1920 to 1923. He returned to Clarksburg in 1923 and was elected as a Republican to the U.S. Senate and served from March 4, 1925, to March 3, 1931; he was not a candidate for renomination in 1930.

While in the Senate, he was chairman of the Committee on Expenditures in Executive Departments (Seventy-first Congress). He resided in Washington, D.C. and died at his winter home in Thomasville, Georgia, in 1933, aged 66. Interment was in Arlington National Cemetery.

Guy D. Goff was a son of Nathan Goff, a U.S. Senator and Representative from West Virginia, and was the father of Louise Goff Reece, a U.S. Representative from Tennessee.

Party political offices
Preceded by Davis Elkins	Republican Party nominee for U.S. Senator from West Virginia (Class 2); 1924	Succeeded by James Elwood Jones
U.S. Senate
Preceded by Davis Elkins	Class 2 Senator from West Virginia; 1925–1931	Succeeded by Matthew M. Neely
