= Charles H. Anson =

American businessman and politician

Charles Henry Anson (November 22, 1841 – February 15, 1928) was an American businessman and politician.

Anson was born in Peru, New York and went to school in Keeseville, New York. During the American Civil War, Anton served in the 11th Vermont Infantry and was commissioned a major. In 1866, Anson moved to Milwaukee, Wisconsin and was involved with the wholesale grocery business. In 1891 and 1892, Anson served in the Wisconsin State Assembly and was a Republican. He ran for mayor of Milwaukee in 1902, losing to incumbent David Stuart Rose. Anson died at his home in Milwaukee, Wisconsin.
