= Louis Metzler =

American politician

Louis Metzler (February 18, 1864 – October 9, 1929) was an American auditor, bookkeeper and Republican politician who served one term as a member of the Wisconsin State Assembly from Milwaukee, Wisconsin, representing the 10th Milwaukee County district (the 10th Ward of the City of Milwaukee).

== Background and career ==
Metzler was born in Milwaukee County on February 18, 1864, and received his education in public schools. He worked in the auditing department of the Chicago, Milwaukee & St. Paul Railway from 1883 to 1890; from 1891 to 1894 held a similar position with the Milwaukee, Lake Shore and Western Railway, and from 1896 to 1903 worked as an independent bookkeeper.

== Public office ==
In the spring of 1904, Metzler (described in all accounts as a "lifelong Republican") was the Republican nominee for justice of the peace in his district, but lost to the Socialist candidate by 425 votes. In the fall general election of that year, however, he was elected to the Assembly, with 1,411 votes to 1,209 for Socialist Jacob Hunger and 627 for Democrat William Biesel, succeeding fellow Republican George Rankl. He was assigned to the standing committees on railroads and on enrolled bills. He did not run for re-election in 1906, and was succeeded by fellow Republican Herman Georgi. He then served five years as deputy register of deeds in Milwaukee County.

== Later life ==
In 1912, he left politics and opened one of the first five and dime stores in Milwaukee, which he operated for fifteen years. He died on October 9, 1929, at his home on Milwaukee's North Side, leaving a widow Minnie, two daughters and two sons. He was a charter member of Nest 1818 of the Fraternal Order of Owls.
