= Davis Elkins =

American politician (1876–1959)

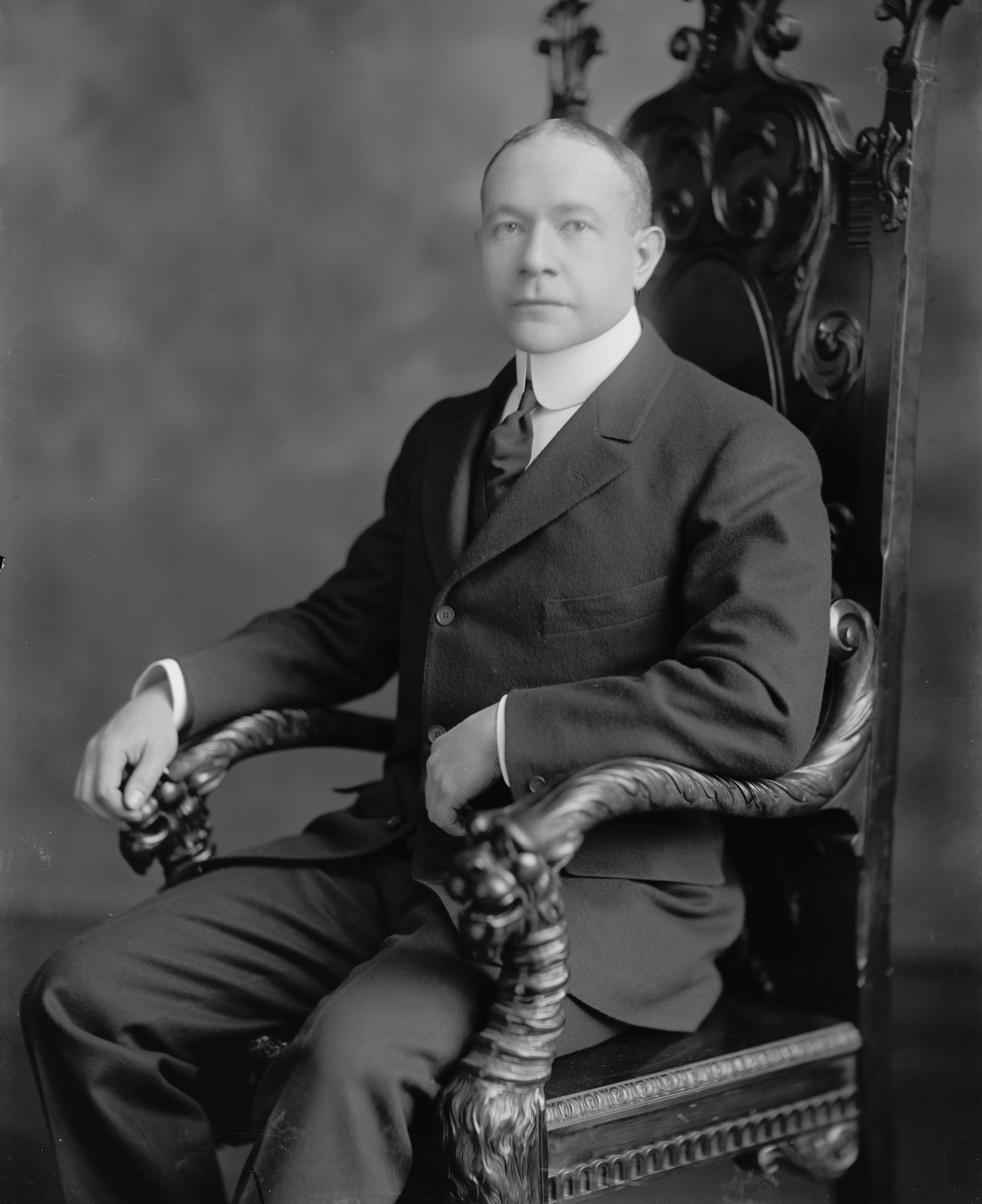
- Elkins, c. 1911–1925

United States Senator from West Virginia
- In office January 9, 1911 – January 31, 1911
- Appointed by: William E. Glasscock
- Preceded by: Stephen B. Elkins
- Succeeded by: Clarence W. Watson
- In office March 4, 1919 – March 3, 1925
- Preceded by: Nathan Goff, Jr.
- Succeeded by: Guy D. Goff

Personal details
- Born: January 24, 1876 Washington, D.C.
- Died: January 5, 1959 (aged 82) Richmond, Virginia
- Party: Republican

Davis Elkins (January 24, 1876 – January 5, 1959) was a United States senator from West Virginia.

== Biography ==
Born in Washington, D.C., he attended the Lawrenceville School, Phillips Academy in Andover, Massachusetts and Harvard University. During the Spanish–American War he enlisted as a private in the First West Virginia Volunteer Infantry, becoming assistant adjutant general in 1898.

Elkins was an industrialist with interests in railroads, banking, utilities, and coal mining; he was appointed as a Republican to the U.S. Senate to fill the vacancy caused by the death of his father, Stephen Benton Elkins, and served from January 9 to January 31, 1911, when a successor was elected. During World War I he served as a major with the 7th Division of the United States Army in France, 1917–1918. He was then elected to the U.S. Senate and served from March 4, 1919, to March 3, 1925; he was not a candidate for renomination in 1924. While in the Senate he was chairman of the Committee on Expenditures in the Department of Commerce (Sixty-sixth Congress).

From 1936 to 1956 he was owner of the Washington and Old Dominion Railroad Company. Davis Elkins died in Richmond, Virginia in 1959; interment was in Maplewood Cemetery, Elkins, West Virginia.

Davis Elkins' father, Stephen B. Elkins, and his grandfather, Henry Gassaway Davis, were both U.S. senators from West Virginia. He was married to Mary Reagan Elkins and had 3 children. His sister Katherine Hallie "Kitty" Elkins (Jan. 14, 1886 – Sept. 3, 1936) was engaged for some time to Prince Luigi Amedeo, Duke of the Abruzzi (1873–1933), a cousin of the king of Italy.

== See also ==
- List of United States senators from West Virginia

Party political offices
First	Republican Party nominee for U.S. Senator from West Virginia (Class 2); 1918	Succeeded by Guy D. Goff
U.S. Senate
Preceded by Stephen B. Elkins	Class 2 Senator from West Virginia; 1911	Succeeded by Clarence W. Watson
Preceded by Nathan Goff, Jr.	Class 2 Senator from West Virginia; 1919–1925	Succeeded by Guy D. Goff
