= 1920 United States presidential election in Wisconsin =

- November 2, 1920
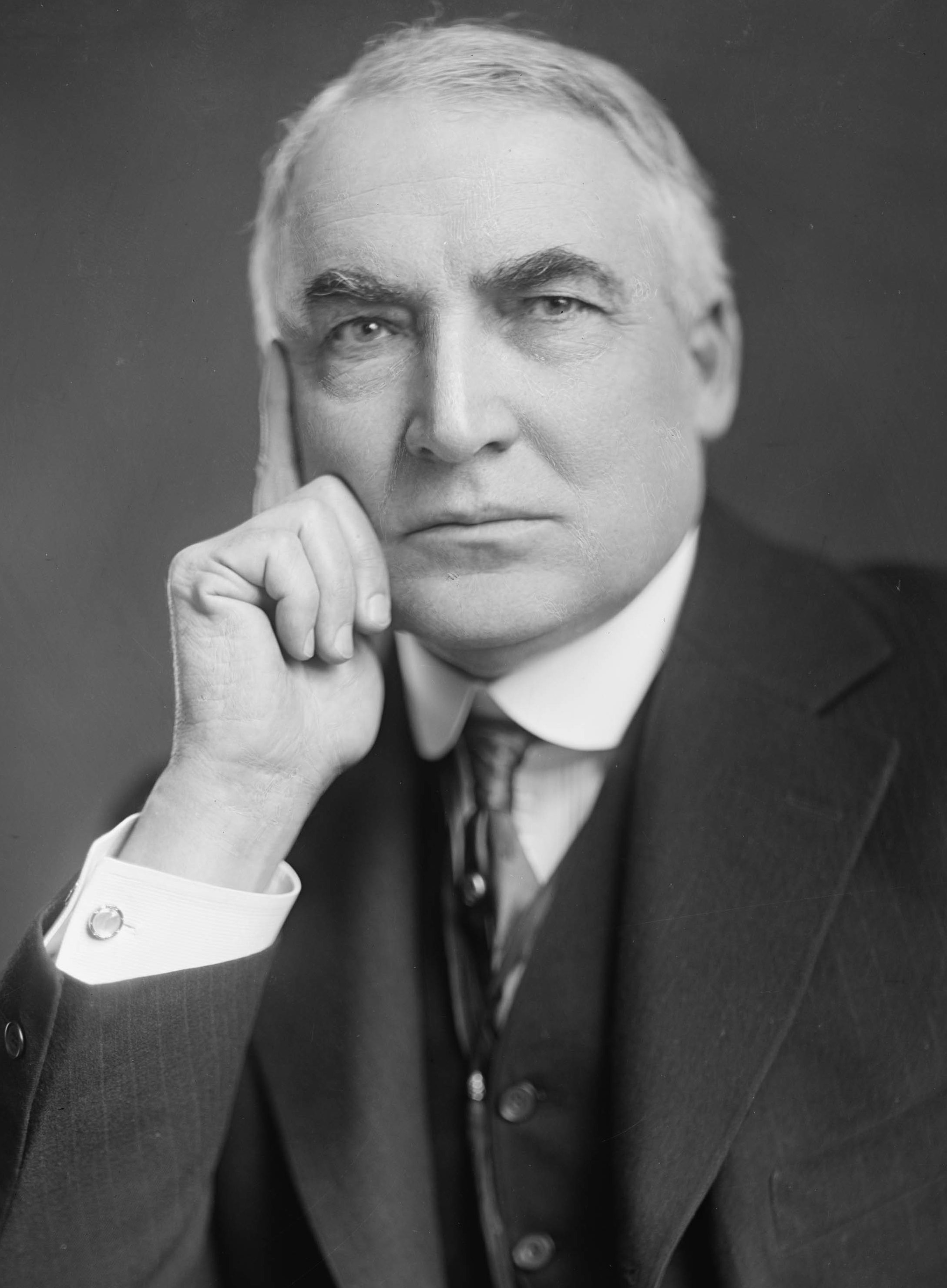

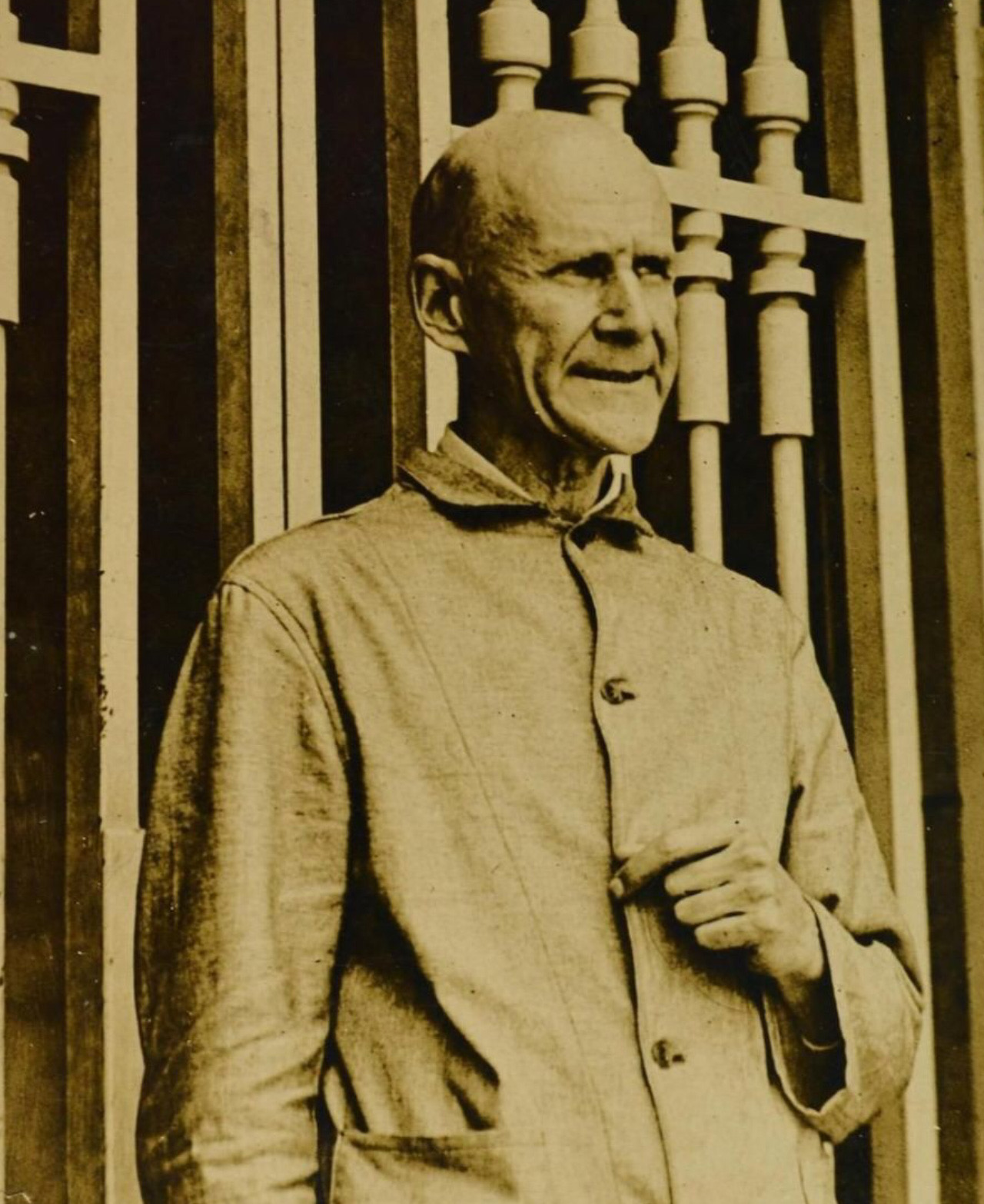
Nominee	Warren G. Harding	James M. Cox	Eugene V. Debs
Party	Republican	Democratic	Social-Democratic
Home state	Ohio	Ohio	Indiana
Running mate	Calvin Coolidge	Franklin D. Roosevelt	Seymour Stedman
Electoral vote	13	0	0
Popular vote	498,576	113,422	80,635
Percentage	71.09%	16.17%	11.50%
County results
Harding
50–60%
60–70%
70–80%
80–90%
President before election
Woodrow Wilson
Democratic
Elected President
Warren G. Harding
Republican

The 1920 United States presidential election in Wisconsin was held on November 2, 1920, as part of the 1920 United States presidential election. State voters chose 13 electors to the Electoral College, who voted for president and vice president.

Wisconsin had ever since the decline of the Populist movement been substantially a one-party state dominated by the Republican Party. The Democratic Party became entirely uncompetitive outside certain German Catholic counties adjoining Lake Michigan as the upper classes, along with the majority of workers who followed them, completely fled from William Jennings Bryan's agrarian and free silver sympathies. As Democratic strength weakened severely after 1894 – although the state did develop a strong Social-Democratic Party to provide opposition to the GOP – Wisconsin developed the direct Republican primary in 1903 and this ultimately created competition between the "League" under Robert M. La Follette, and the conservative "Regular" faction.

The beginning of the 1910s would see a minor Democratic revival as many La Follette progressives endorsed Woodrow Wilson, but this flirtation would not be long-lasting as Wilson's "Anglophile" foreign policies were severely opposed by Wisconsin's largely German- and Scandinavian-American populace. The 1918 mid-term elections saw the Midwestern farming community largely desert the Democratic Party due to supposed preferential treatment of Southern farmers: Democratic seats in the Midwest fell from thirty-four to seventeen, whilst Scandinavian-Americans were also vigorously opposed to entering the war. Furthermore, Democratic fear of Communism seen in the Palmer Raids and "Red Scare" led to ultimate nominee James M. Cox, then Governor of Ohio, to ban German-language instruction in public schools in 1919. Still more critical for German-Americans was the view that outgoing President Woodrow Wilson was deliberately trying to punish Germany and Austria for starting the war, especially via his disregard for the United Kingdom's continuing blockade of Germany. Stressing Harding's German ancestry, the German press drummed up the view that a vote for Harding was a vote against the persecutions suffered by German-Americans during the war.

== Campaign ==
As the campaign began after the Republican Party had nominated U.S. Senator Warren G. Harding of Ohio and the Democratic Party former Ohio governor James M. Cox, a further blow to the Democrats came when the national economy suffered a major downturn following the wartime boom, resulting in plummeting agricultural prices that were especially problematic in the Midwest. Whereas Cox travelled throughout the nation apart from the "Solid South" during September, Harding, despite having four times the budget, campaigned from his home in Marion, Ohio.

A poll by the giant Rexall drug store chain – which in 1916 had been accurate enough to predict Wilson's razor-thin wins in New Hampshire and California – suggested Harding would win 382 electoral votes, and at the end of October, although no more opinion polls had been published, most observers were even more convinced that the Republicans would take complete control of all branches of government. Polls were similarly confident in Wisconsin, despite forecasts of a big vote for imprisoned fifth-time Social-Democratic nominee Eugene V. Debs. Expectations of a landslide were fully realized: whereas Charles Evans Hughes had carried Wisconsin by only 6.59 points in 1916, Harding won this arch-isolationist state by a nine-to-two majority. Wisconsin would prove to be Harding's fourth strongest state in the 1920 election terms of popular vote percentage after North Dakota, Vermont and Michigan. Wisconsin would prove Cox's weakest state in the largest landslide loss in United States presidential election history, and Debs' strongest state in his last campaign for the presidency. Despite Debs' substantial vote, Harding carried all Wisconsin's counties with absolute majorities, becoming the only candidate to ever win every single Wisconsin county in a presidential election, and Cox cracked twenty-three percent of the vote in just three counties. This would be the last time a Republican presidential candidate carried Iron County until Richard Nixon in 1972.

== Results ==
General Election Results (Note: One should exercise caution with using the 1921 Blue Book as a source for the 1920 election in Wisconsin; it contains a number of misprints that cause the county figures to not add up to the stated totals. The true figures can all be found in the 1920 Board of Canvassers reports, held at the Wisconsin Historical Society in Madison.)
Party	Pledged to	Elector	Votes
Republican Party	Warren G. Harding	Mrs. Theodore Youmans	498,576
Republican Party	Warren G. Harding	Z. G. Simmons	497,664
Republican Party	Warren G. Harding	John Turner	497,243
Republican Party	Warren G. Harding	Myron E. Keats	497,099
Republican Party	Warren G. Harding	Sam Blum	496,920
Republican Party	Warren G. Harding	Max Sell	496,875
Republican Party	Warren G. Harding	William Mauthe	496,821
Republican Party	Warren G. Harding	James T. Drought	496,786
Republican Party	Warren G. Harding	John Fitzgibbons	496,677
Republican Party	Warren G. Harding	Anton Kuckuk	496,661
Republican Party	Warren G. Harding	David A. Bogue	496,509
Republican Party	Warren G. Harding	Mrs. Al C. Anderson	496,236
Republican Party	Warren G. Harding	John T. Murphy	496,161
Democratic Party	James M. Cox	John C. Karel	113,422
Democratic Party	James M. Cox	Anthony Szczerbinski	113,298
Democratic Party	James M. Cox	Charles Mulberger	113,236
Democratic Party	James M. Cox	Mrs. A. Tupper	113,196
Democratic Party	James M. Cox	M. K. Reilly	113,119
Democratic Party	James M. Cox	Vilas W. Whaley	113,118
Democratic Party	James M. Cox	John W. Hogan	112,962
Democratic Party	James M. Cox	H. A. Pfeffer	112,790
Democratic Party	James M. Cox	John P. Diener	112,765
Democratic Party	James M. Cox	Henry E. Fitch	112,742
Democratic Party	James M. Cox	Earl Y. Sangster	112,730
Democratic Party	James M. Cox	M. R. Strouse	112,619
Democratic Party	James M. Cox	John O'Day	112,531
Social-Democratic Party	Eugene V. Debs	Cora Wuethrick	80,635
Social-Democratic Party	Eugene V. Debs	Casimir Kowalski	80,629
Social-Democratic Party	Eugene V. Debs	Richard Holtz	80,601
Social-Democratic Party	Eugene V. Debs	Mrs. E. T. Melms	80,597
Social-Democratic Party	Eugene V. Debs	Louis Pauls	80,555
Social-Democratic Party	Eugene V. Debs	John G. Justen	80,554
Social-Democratic Party	Eugene V. Debs	R. W. Koehn	80,554
Social-Democratic Party	Eugene V. Debs	Mrs. John H. Sims	80,541
Social-Democratic Party	Eugene V. Debs	Fred Heath	80,513
Social-Democratic Party	Eugene V. Debs	G. P. Haus	80,495
Social-Democratic Party	Eugene V. Debs	Mrs. Frank Hilger	80,481
Social-Democratic Party	Eugene V. Debs	Ray M. Empey	53,101
Social-Democratic Party	Eugene V. Debs	F. E. Withrow	52,213
Social-Democratic Party	Eugene V. Debs	J. Verchota	27,886
Social-Democratic Party	Eugene V. Debs	A. C. Krueger	27,069
Prohibition Party	Aaron S. Watkins	Marcia A. B. Smith	8,647
Prohibition Party	Aaron S. Watkins	David W. Emerson	8,529
Prohibition Party	Aaron S. Watkins	Francis Baker	8,517
Prohibition Party	Aaron S. Watkins	Peter T. James	8,498
Prohibition Party	Aaron S. Watkins	Frank E. Cummings	8,470
Prohibition Party	Aaron S. Watkins	Joseph V. Collins	8,467
Prohibition Party	Aaron S. Watkins	Benjamin F. Skiff	8,466
Prohibition Party	Aaron S. Watkins	August F. Fehlandt	8,445
Prohibition Party	Aaron S. Watkins	Walter R. Drought	8,431
Prohibition Party	Aaron S. Watkins	John H. Malloch	8,425
Prohibition Party	Aaron S. Watkins	William R. Nethercut	8,425
Prohibition Party	Aaron S. Watkins	Lily Shimmin	8,413
Prohibition Party	Aaron S. Watkins	Ole H. Caspers	8,408
Write-in		Scattering	82
Votes cast (Note: Based on totals for highest elector on each ticket)			701,362

=== Results by county ===
County	Warren G. Harding Republican		James M. Cox Democratic		Eugene V. Debs Social-Democratic		Aaron S. Watkins Prohibition		Margin		Total votes cast (Note: Based on highest elector on each ticket)
County	#	%	#	%	#	%	#	%	#	%	Total votes cast
Adams	1,528	75.42%	392	19.35%	60	2.96%	27	1.335%	1,136	56.07%	2,026 (Note: Includes 19 Scattering votes)
Ashland	4,005	70.94%	1,081	19.15%	497	8.80%	63	1.12%	2,924	51.79%	5,646
Barron	6,887	84.09%	742	9.06%	336	4.10%	211	2.58%	6,145	75.03%	8,190 (Note: Includes 14 Scattering votes)
Bayfield	2,536	73.34%	589	17.03%	257	7.43%	76	2.20%	1,947	56.30%	3,458
Brown	8,845	61.66%	3,877	27.03%	1,501	10.46%	122	0.85%	4,968	34.63%	14,345
Buffalo	3,082	85.40%	299	8.28%	172	4.77%	56	1.55%	2,783	77.11%	3,609
Burnett	2,025	79.57%	187	7.35%	275	10.81%	58	2.28%	1,750 (Note: In this county where Debs ran second ahead of Cox, margin given is Hardin vote minus Debs vote and percentage margin Hading percentage minus Debs percentage.)	68.76%	2,545
Calumet	3,730	78.26%	586	12.30%	415	8.71%	35	0.73%	3,144	65.97%	4,766
Chippewa	6,750	82.57%	1,103	13.49%	186	2.28%	136	1.66%	5,647	69.08%	8,175
Clark	6,246	79.74%	745	9.51%	692	8.83%	150	1.91%	5,501	70.23%	7,833
Columbia	7,394	83.25%	1,201	13.52%	157	1.77%	130	1.46%	6,193	69.73%	8,882
Crawford	3,600	74.27%	1,112	22.94%	70	1.44%	64	1.32%	2,488	51.33%	4,847 (Note: Includes 1 Scattering vote)
Dane	22,842	77.46%	4,879	16.55%	1,277	4.33%	490	1.66%	17,963	60.92%	29,488
Dodge	11,354	77.46%	2,293	15.64%	865	5.90%	146	1.00%	9,061	61.82%	14,658
Door	3,817	88.34%	385	8.91%	76	1.76%	43	1.00%	3,432	79.43%	4,321
Douglas	7,250	67.53%	2,111	19.66%	1,271	11.84%	104	0.97%	5,139	47.87%	10,736
Dunn	5,596	87.81%	491	7.70%	170	2.67%	113	1.77%	5,105	80.10%	6,373 (Note: Includes 3 Scattering votes)
Eau Claire	7,856	81.62%	1,193	12.39%	351	3.65%	225	2.34%	6,663	69.23%	9,625
Florence	912	86.86%	98 (Note: The 1921 Blue Book contains a typo for Democratic elector Karel in this county)	9.33%	30	2.86%	10	0.95%	814	77.52%	1,050
Fond du Lac	12,543	74.58%	3,409	20.27%	695	4.13%	172	1.02%	9,134	54.31%	16,819
Forest	1,429	75.13%	379	19.93%	72	3.79%	22	1.16%	1,050	55.21%	1,902
Grant	9,638	80.92%	1,971	16.55%	119	1.00%	183	1.54%	7,667	64.37%	11,911
Green	5,466	84.68%	633	9.81%	109	1.69%	247	3.83%	4,833	74.87%	6,455
Green Lake	3,457	75.45%	890	19.42%	179	3.91%	54	1.18%	2,567	56.02%	4,582 (Note: Includes 2 Scattering votes)
Iowa	5,428	81.42%	942	14.13%	67	1.00%	230	3.45%	4,486	67.29%	6,667
Iron	1,714	77.70%	268	12.15%	179	8.11%	45	2.04%	1,446	65.55%	2,206
Jackson	3,652	85.93%	410	9.65%	106	2.49%	82	1.93%	3,242	76.28%	4,250
Jefferson	8,865	80.38%	1,844	16.72%	203	1.84%	117	1.06%	7,021	63.66%	11,029
Juneau	4,385	81.22%	774	14.34%	174	3.22%	66	1.22%	3,611	66.88%	5,399
Kenosha	9,791	77.81%	1,724	13.70%	990	7.87%	79	0.63%	8,067	64.11%	12,584
Kewaunee	2,622	78.81%	598	17.97%	97	2.92%	9	0.27%	2,024	60.84%	3,327
La Crosse	10,067	73.96%	2,588	19.01%	606	4.45%	350	2.57%	7,479	54.94%	13,612
Lafayette	4,893	76.11%	1,357	21.11%	45	0.70%	134	2.08%	3,536	55.00%	6,429
Langlade	4,059	68.65%	1,619	27.38%	189	3.20%	46	0.78%	2,440	41.27%	5,913
Lincoln	3,713	72.11%	838	16.28%	542	10.53%	56	1.09%	2,875	55.84%	5,149
Manitowoc	8,378	61.70%	2,018	14.86%	3,116	22.95%	67	0.49%	5,262	38.75%	13,579
Marathon	11,356	65.53%	2,133	12.31%	3,709	21.40%	131	0.76%	7,647	44.13%	17,329
Marinette	6,138	75.55%	1,314	16.17%	584	7.19%	88	1.08%	4,824	59.38%	8,124
Marquette	2,436	76.01%	687	21.44%	42	1.31%	31	0.97%	1,749	54.57%	3,205 (Note: Includes 9 Scattering votes)
Milwaukee	73,410	51.58%	25,464	17.89%	42,914	30.16%	523	0.37%	30,496	21.43%	142,311
Monroe	6,784	83.15%	978	11.99%	206	2.52%	178	2.18%	5,806	71.16%	8,159 (Note: Includes 13 Scattering votes)
Oconto	4,735	78.16%	1,030	17.00%	234	3.86%	59	0.97%	3,705	61.16%	6,058
Oneida	2,424	64.93%	833	22.31%	426	11.41%	50	1.34%	1,591	42.62%	3,733
Outagamie	11,140	74.69%	3,121	20.93%	510	3.42%	144	0.97%	8,019	53.76%	14,915
Ozaukee	3,523	75.60%	835	17.92%	279	5.99%	23	0.49%	2,688	57.68%	4,660
Pepin	1,817	84.91%	265	12.38%	36	1.68%	22	1.03%	1,552	72.52%	2,140
Pierce	4,441	82.62%	644	11.98%	167	3.11%	123	2.29%	3,797	70.64%	5,375
Polk	4,796	80.47%	752	12.62%	303	5.08%	109	1.83%	4,044	67.85%	5,960
Portage	5,527	65.39%	2,656	31.42%	199	2.35%	70	0.83%	2,871	33.97%	8,452
Price	2,990	74.23%	551	13.68%	441	10.95%	46	1.14%	2,439	60.55%	4,028
Racine	14,406	71.95%	3,650	18.23%	1,714	8.56%	251	1.25%	10,756	53.72%	20,021
Richland	3,862 (Note: The 1921 Blue Book contains a typo for Republican elector Youmans in this county)	76.63%	917	18.19%	82	1.63%	179	3.55%	2,945	58.43%	5,040
Rock	16,152	83.53%	2,447	12.65%	421	2.18%	317	1.64%	13,705	70.87%	19,337
Rusk	2,609	77.53%	441	13.11%	231	6.86%	81	2.41%	2,168	64.43%	3,365
Sauk	8,074	84.79%	946	9.93%	216	2.27%	286	3.00%	7,128	74.86%	9,522
Sawyer	1,668	79.28%	302	14.35%	98	4.66%	36	1.71%	1,366	64.92%	2,104
Shawano	5,836	73.64%	525	6.62%	1,496	18.88%	68	0.86%	4,340	54.76%	7,925
Sheboygan	11,994	68.95%	1,895	10.89%	3,416	19.64%	91	0.52%	8,578	49.31%	17,396
St. Croix	5,601	73.34%	1,638	21.45%	263	3.44%	135	1.77%	3,963	51.89%	7,637
Taylor	2,707	72.71%	282	7.57%	685	18.40%	49 (Note: The 1921 Blue Book contains a typo for Prohibition elector Smith in this county)	1.32%	2,022	54.31%	3,723
Trempealeau	4,748	84.05%	718	12.71%	70	1.24%	100	1.77%	4,030	71.50%	5,649
Vernon	5,694	86.00%	629	9.50%	98	1.48%	200	3.02%	5,065	76.50%	6,621
Vilas	903	66.06%	255	18.65%	185	13.53%	24	1.76%	648	47.40%	1,367
Walworth	8,437	80.68%	1,631	15.60%	151	1.44%	239	2.29%	6,806	65.08%	10,458
Washburn	2,023	78.26%	352	13.62%	150	5.80%	60	2.32%	1,671	64.64%	2,585
Washington	5,949	76.78%	1,328	17.14%	421	5.43%	50	0.65%	4,621	59.64%	7,748
Waukesha	8,665	71.63%	2,759	22.81%	487	4.03%	186	1.54%	5,906	48.82%	12,097
Waupaca	8,302	83.04%	888	8.88%	697	6.97%	110	1.10%	7,414	74.16%	9,997
Waushara	4,176	85.17%	482	9.83%	196	4.00%	49	1.00%	3,694	75.34%	4,903
Winnebago	12,035	69.52%	3,397	19.62%	1,697	9.80%	179	1.03%	8,638	49.90%	17,311
Wood	6,863	70.60%	1,051	10.81%	1,665	17.13%	142	1.46%	5,198	53.47%	9,721
Totals	498,576	71.09%	113,422	16.17%	80,635	11.50%	8,647	1.23%	385,154	54.92%	701,362

==== Counties that flipped from Democratic to Republican ====
- Brown
- Dane
- Kewaunee
- La Crosse
- Langlade
- Manitowoc
- Milwaukee
- Portage
- Racine
- Sawyer
- Waukesha

== See also ==
- United States presidential elections in Wisconsin
