= Fred C. Haack =

German-American politician (1873–1944)

Alderman of the Sheboygan Common Council for the 5th Ward
- In office 1897–1916
- Succeeded by: Ernst Zehms

Personal details
- Born: Fred C. Haack c. 1873; Germany
- Died: 1944; Milwaukee, Wisconsin
- Political party: Socialist (Wisconsin) Populist Party
- Spouse: Elizabeth Schneider

Fred C. Haack (c. 1873–1944) was the first member of the Social Democratic Party to hold public office in the United States. He was originally elected to the common council of Sheboygan, Wisconsin as a member of the Populist Party in 1897, but he soon joined in organizing the local Social Democratic Party. Running on the Socialist ticket, he was re-elected 5th ward alderman in 1898. He served a total of sixteen years. Haack was recognized as the first American Socialist officeholder at the national Socialist Party convention held in Milwaukee in 1932, despite the fact that socialists had been elected as Chicago aldermen and Illinois legislators as early as 1878. Also elected in 1898 on the Socialist ticket was local baseball manager August L. Mohr.

Haack was born in Germany, and in 1882 he traveled to Sheboygan to join up with his father Frederick Sr. who worked as a laborer. In 1891 Frederick Sr. opened a shoe and boot store on the city's south side at 1226 Georgia Avenue, where he made his home on the second floor with his wife Regina and his growing family. By 1892 son Fred was the bookkeeper for the family business. In 1897 he married Elizabeth Schneider, who lived on the same street.

As the alderman for Sheboygan's 5th ward, Haack turned from populism to socialism in 1897. He did not advocate a radical agenda, but was often a contentious figure. He promoted city ownership of public utilities. He also advanced a bond issue that helped build a new school in his precinct. He was also in favor of paying aldermen to attend council meetings. He sat on various committees concerning the judiciary, the poor, printing, licenses, bonds and salaries, and became a powerful chairman of the building committee later in his tenure. In 1900 the city council appointed a committee to investigate Haack in regard to the purchase of additional school grounds. In 1914 aldermen elected Haack president of the common council. He ran for mayor the next year, but was unsuccessful. Months later he objected to the appointment of a Socialist to a vacant council seat previously held by a Republican.

By 1908 Haack had moved to a new residence down the block from his business. In 1915 he bought out the interests of other heirs to the shoe store property, which had also become a substation of the local post office. In April 1916 Haack unexpectedly failed to be re-elected to the council. Less than a week later his store was damaged by a fire that destroyed much of his stock. That October he was hired as a local insurance agent for the Eureka F. & M. and the Security of Cincinnati.

He moved his family to Milwaukee, where Haack purchased rental property. He was still engaged in the insurance business when his wife died in 1924. He joined the 24th ward branch of the city's Socialist Party in 1930, and was re-instated as an honorary member of the 21st ward branch. He held the position of party secretary for many years. He later held clerical positions with various Milwaukee County institutions. In later life Haack was crippled in an auto accident. A few years later in August 1944 his body was found in the Milwaukee River.
