= 1904 Milwaukee mayoral election =

- April 5, 1904
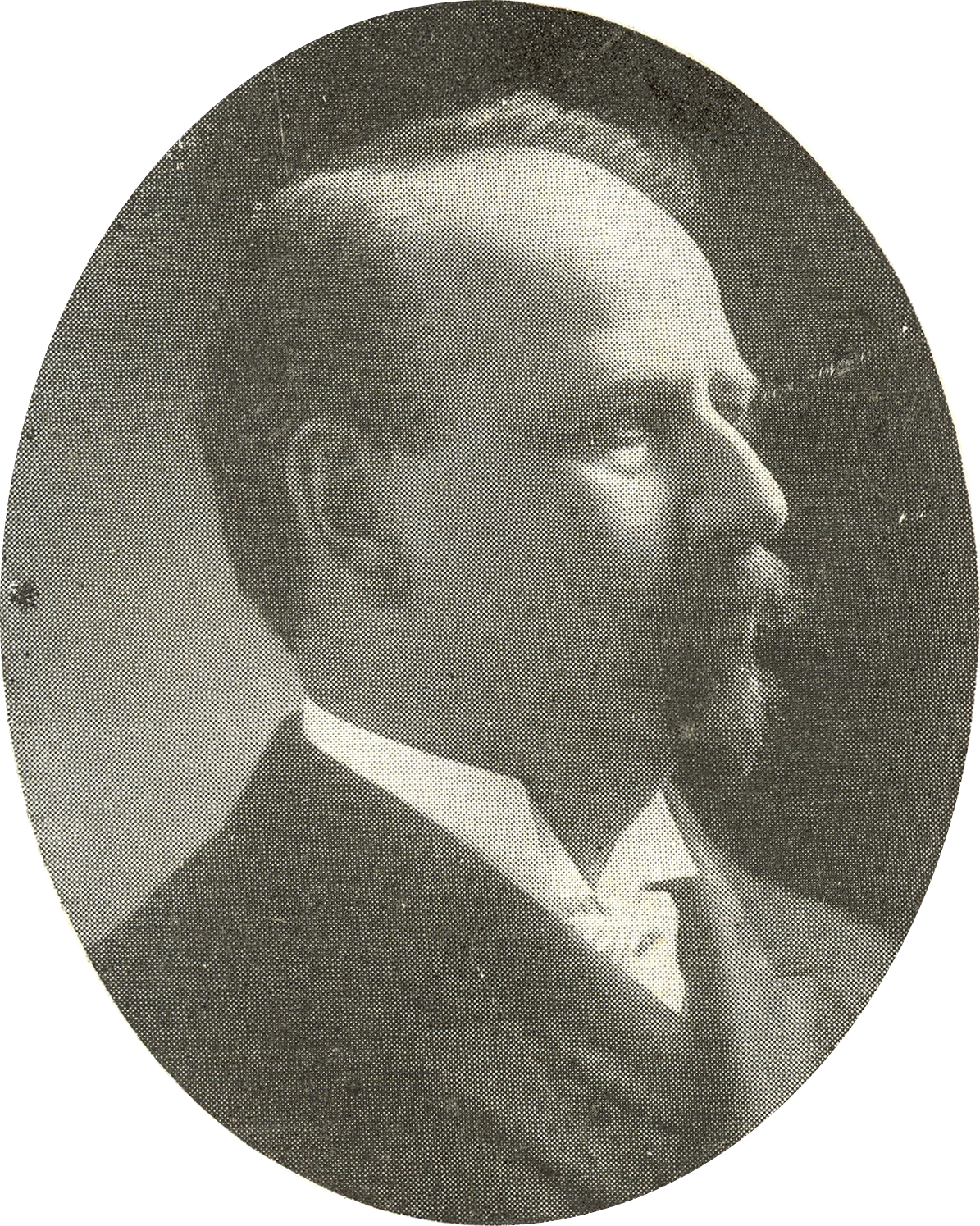

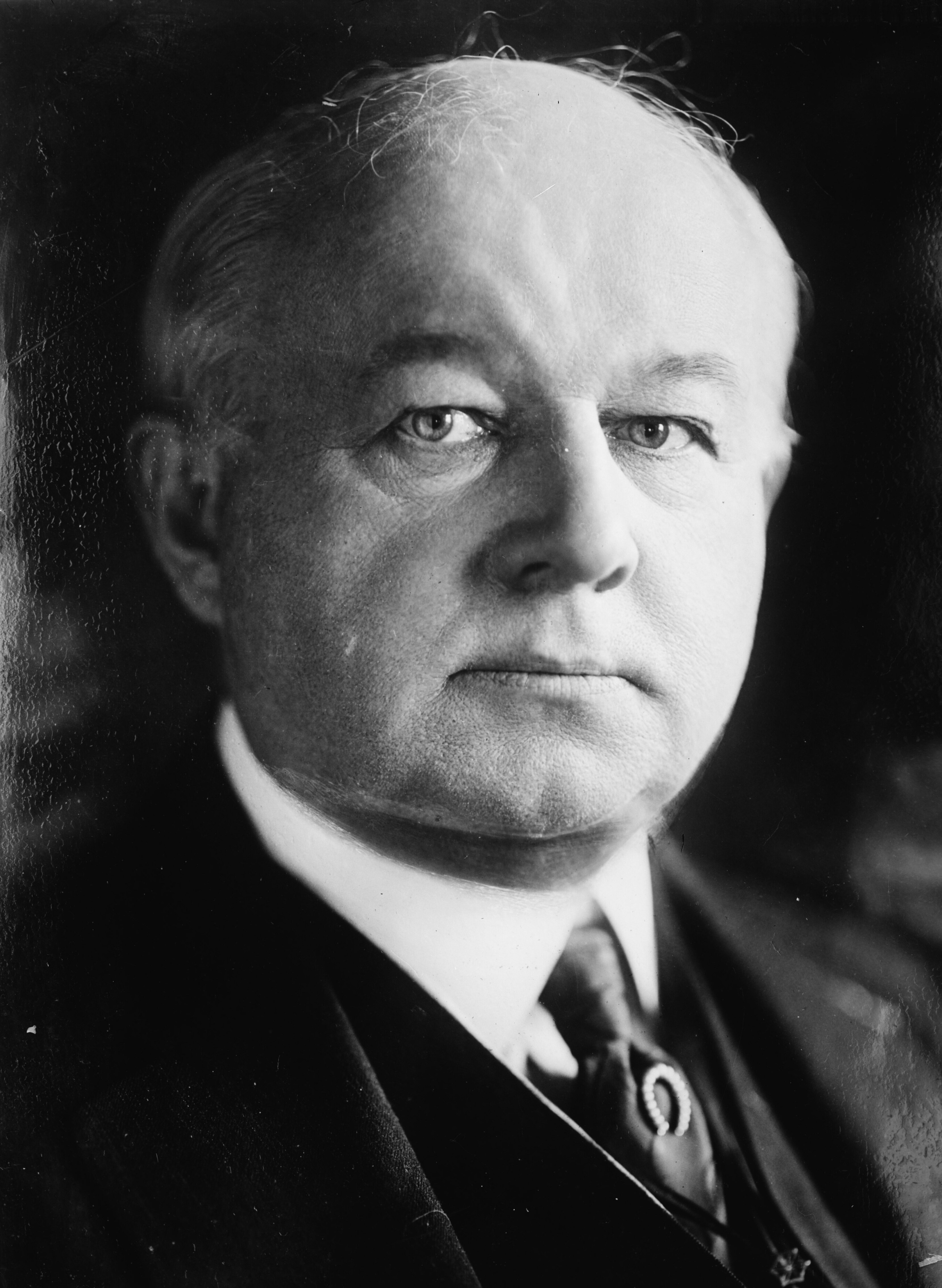

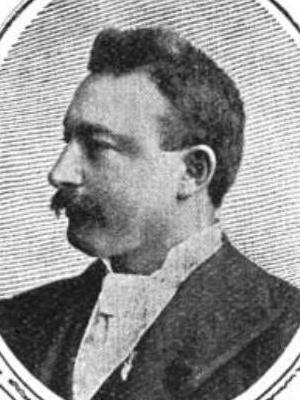

Nominee	David S. Rose	Guy D. Goff
Party	Democratic	Republican
Popular vote	23,515	17,603
Percentage	40.47%	30.30%
Nominee	Victor L. Berger	Frank Wilke
Party	Social-Democratic	Socialist Labor
Popular vote	13,333	3,650
Percentage	22.95%	6.28%
Mayor before election
David S. Rose
Democratic
Elected mayor
David S. Rose
Democratic

An election for Mayor of Milwaukee was held on April 5, 1904. Incumbent mayor David S. Rose was re-elected with 40% of the vote.

Candidates included incumbent mayor David S. Rose, Milwaukee County prosecuting attorney Guy D. Goff, Vorwärts! editor Victor L. Berger, and Socialist Laborite Frank Wilke.

== Results ==
Milwaukee mayoral election, 1904
Party	Candidate	Votes	%
Democratic	David S. Rose	23,515	40.47
Republican	Guy D. Goff	17,603	30.30
Social-Democratic	Victor L. Berger	13,333	22.95
Socialist Labor	Frank Wilke	3,650	6.28
Total votes		58,101	100.00
