= Jacob Hahn =

American politician

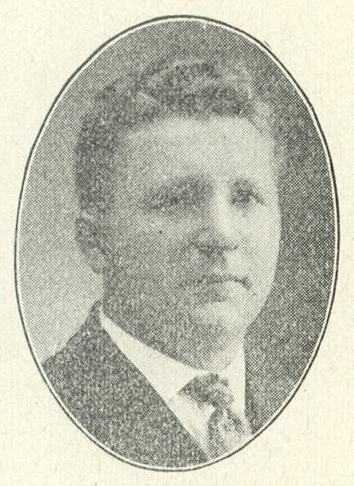
Hahn's official State Assembly portrait, 1911

Jacob Hahn was a cigar maker from Milwaukee, Wisconsin, who served one term as a Socialist member of the Wisconsin State Assembly.

Hahn was born in Wittlich, Germany on October 10, 1879. He came to Milwaukee in 1883, attended the public schools, learned the craft of cigarmaking, and had been a trade union member of the Cigar Maker's Union for the past thirteen years when elected. Hahn was married to Martha Strasse. He died March 24, 1970, in Milwaukee.

== Legislature ==
In 1910, Hahn was elected to the Fifth Milwaukee County Assembly seat (5th and 12th Wards of the City of Milwaukee), unseating incumbent Democrat Michael Kalaher with 1,581 votes to 982 for Kalaher and 779 for Republican Albert T. Jenkins. He was assigned to the standing committees on excises and fees, and on engrossed bills.

By 1912, a redistricting had split Hahn's district into two new districts matching the numbers of the wards which made them up. The new Fifth elected Democrat Charles Stemper, and the new Twelfth elected Hahn's fellow Socialist and union activist William L. Smith. Hahn returned to the cigar trade.
