= William L. Smith (barber) =

20th century American politician

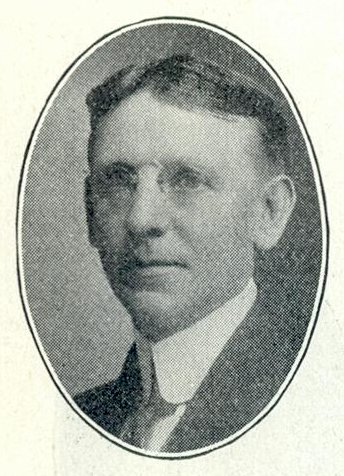
- Smith c. 1913

Member of the Wisconsin State Assembly from the Milwaukee 12th district
- In office January 6, 1913 – January 6, 1919
- Preceded by: Max E. Binner
- Succeeded by: George Czerwinski

Personal details
- Born: March 12, 1878 Franklin, Milwaukee County, Wisconsin, U.S.
- Died: 1951 (aged 72–73)
- Resting place: Forest Home Cemetery, Milwaukee, Wisconsin
- Party: Socialist
- Occupation: Barber

William L. Smith (March 12, 1878 – 1951) was an American barber and socialist politician from Milwaukee, Wisconsin. He served three terms in the Wisconsin State Assembly (1913, 1915, 1917), representing the south side of the city of Milwaukee.

== Background and business ==
Smith was born in Franklin, Milwaukee County, Wisconsin, in 1878. He attended both public and parochial schools, but at the age of fourteen years was compelled to earn his own living. He became a barber's apprentice, and continued in that trade. He opened his own shop on Kinnickinnic Avenue in the Bay View neighborhood of Milwaukee about 1897. His official biography boasted, "Smith has always been a union man and employs nothing but union men in his shop".

== Legislative service ==
Smith was first elected in 1912 in the newly-redistricted twelfth Milwaukee County Assembly seat (12th Ward of the City of Milwaukee), succeeding fellow Socialist and union activist Jacob Hahn. Smith received 1,125 votes to 1,007 for Democrat John F. Filut, 450 for Republican Martin Gedlinski, and 31 for Prohibitionist Walter Lewerenz. Smith was assigned to the legislature's joint committee on finance.

In 1914, Smith won re-election, with 932 votes to 828 for Gedlinski (now running as a Democrat) and 329 for Republican John J. Morris; and remained on the joint finance committee. In 1916, he was again re-elected, with 944 votes to 785 for Democrat William T. Langen and 499 for Republican J. Jensen, and remained on the joint finance committee, on which he was now joined by newly elected Republican Assemblyman William L. Smith of Neillsville.

In 1918, Smith was defeated for re-election by Democrat George Czerwinski, 1006 to 863.
