= 1900 Milwaukee mayoral election =

- April 3, 1900
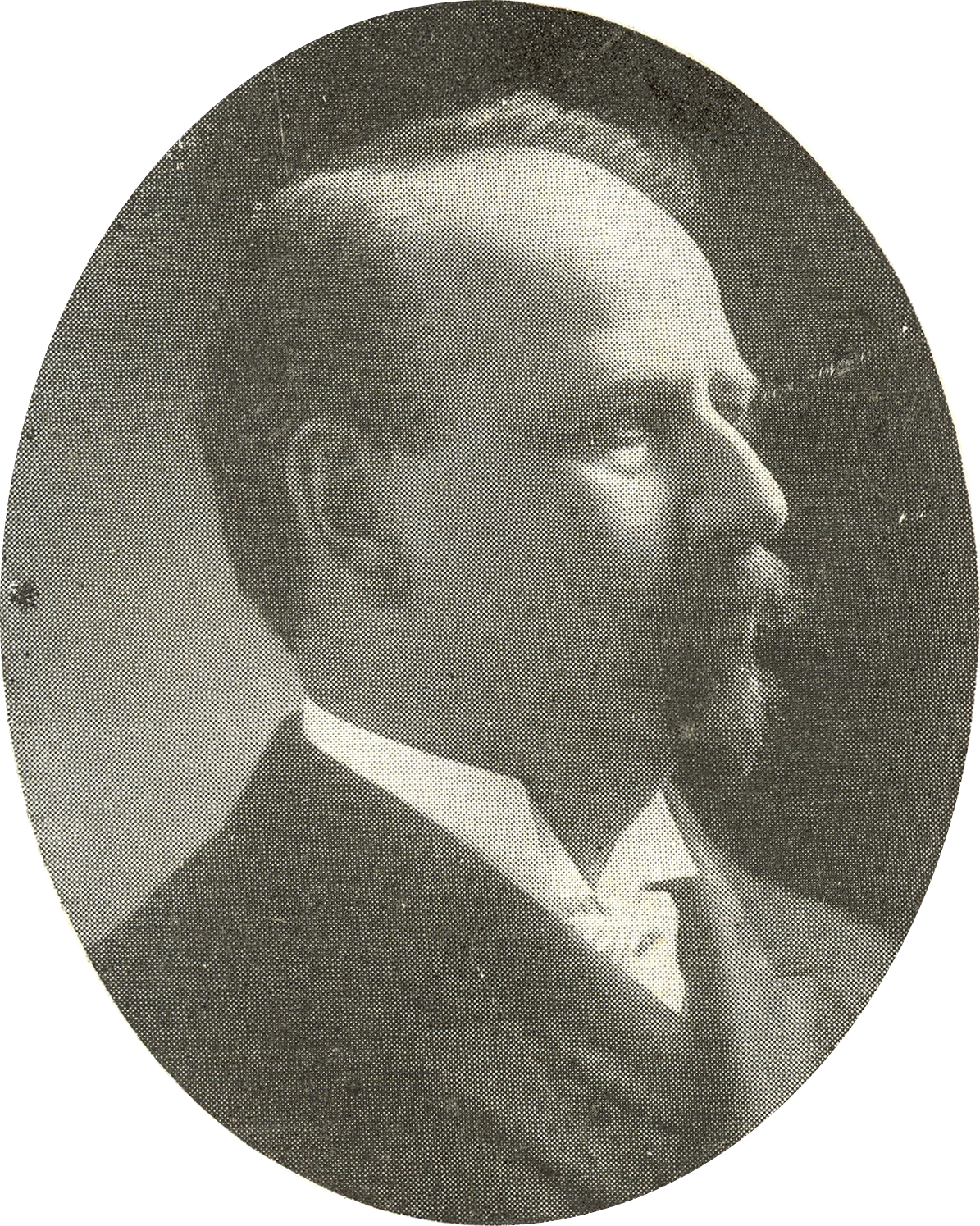

Nominee	David S. Rose	Henry J. Baumgaertner	Unknown
Party	Democratic	Republican	Social-Democratic
Popular vote	~25,437	~23,063	~2,600
Percentage	~49.88%	~45.22%	~5.10%
Mayor before election
David S. Rose
Democratic
Elected mayor
David S. Rose
Democratic

An election for Mayor of Milwaukee was held on April 3, 1900. Incumbent mayor David S. Rose was re-elected with 50% of the vote.

Candidates included incumbent mayor David S. Rose, Republican Henry J. Baumgaertner, and a Social Democrat.

== Results ==
Milwaukee mayoral election, 1900
Party	Candidate	Votes	%
Democratic	David S. Rose	~25,437	~49.88
Republican	Henry J. Baumgaertner	~23,063	~45.22
Social-Democratic	Unknown	~2,600	~5.10
Total votes		~51,000	100.00
