= William Alldridge =

American politician

William J. Alldridge
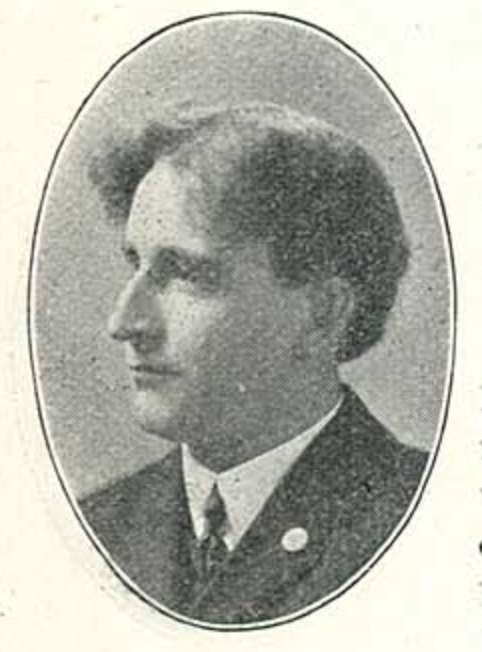

Member of the Wisconsin State Assembly
- In office 1905–1908
- Succeeded by: M. W. Kalaher

Personal details
- Born: March 18, 1879 Bay View, Wisconsin
- Died: June 9, 1942 (aged 63)
- Party: Socialist
- Occupation: Machinist, lawyer

William J. Alldridge (March 18, 1879 – June 9, 1942) was an American machinist from Milwaukee who served two terms as a Socialist member of the Wisconsin State Assembly representing the 5th Milwaukee County district (the 5th and 12th Wards of the City of Milwaukee). He later became a member of the Milwaukee Common Council, attended law school, and became a lawyer.

== Background ==
Alldridge was born in Bay View, Wisconsin on March 18, 1879; he became a machinist by trade and a member of the Machinists Union.

== Public office ==
Alldridge had never run for or held public office until he was elected to the Assembly in 1904, receiving 1,629 votes against 1,568 votes for Republican William T. Duke, 1,518 for Democrat Joseph O'Hearn (Democratic incumbent Frank Hassa was not a candidate for re-election) and 34 for Charles M. Frink, an independent Democrat. He was assigned to the standing committee on the judiciary. He was re-elected in 1906, with 1503 votes against 1015 for Republican Frank Ammon and 887 for Democrat John Desseler.

He was not a candidate in 1908, and was succeeded by Democrat M. W. Kalaher. In 1910, he was among the many Socialists elected to the Milwaukee Common Council in the Sewer Socialists victory, and continued to serve through at least 1918.

== Legal career ==
In later years he graduated from Marquette University Law School and became a lawyer. He was still a member of the bar at his death in June 1942.
