= Arthur Kahn =

American politician

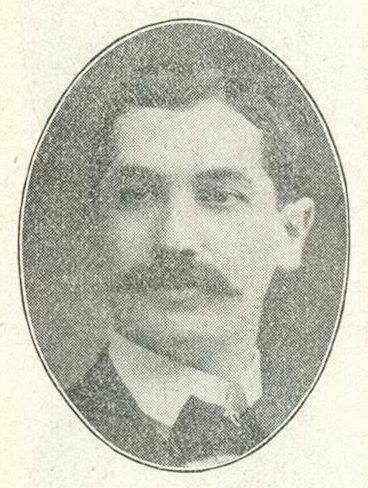
- Kahn in c. 1911

Member of the Wisconsin State Assembly from the Milwaukee 10th district
- In office January 2, 1911 – January 6, 1913
- Preceded by: Herman Georgi
- Succeeded by: Edward H. Kiefer

Personal details
- Born: November 9, 1875 or 1874 Ústí nad Labem, Bohemia, Austria-Hungary
- Died: December 31, 1930 (aged 55) New York City, United States
- Known for: Member of the Wisconsin State Assembly

Arthur Kahn (November 9, 1875 or 1874 - December 31, 1930) was a baker, trade union activist and organizer from Milwaukee, Wisconsin who served one term as a Socialist member of the Wisconsin State Assembly.

== Background ==
Born in Aussig, Bohemia, Austria-Hungary (now Ústí nad Labem in the Czech Republic) in November 1875, Kahn came to the United States at the age of 15 and began to work in a bakery. He served as a business agent for the Milwaukee Bakers Union, as an organizer for the Bakery and Confectionery Workers union in the U.S. and Canada, and as a delegate to various conventions of the Wisconsin State Federation of Labor and the American Federation of Labor, as well as representing Philadelphia's Central Labor Union at the Second American Peace Congress in Chicago in 1909.

== Legislative service ==
Kahn was elected on the Social Democratic ticket (as the party was still known in Wisconsin) in 1910 to succeed Republican incumbent Herman Emil Georgi (who was not a candidate for re-election) in the 10th Milwaukee County district (the 10th Ward of the City of Milwaukee). He won with 1370 votes to 1034 for Republican Edward Wunderlick and 36 for Democrat Joseph E. Matzek.

Kahn did not run for re-election in 1912, and was succeeded by fellow Socialist Edward Zinn.
