= Edward Zinn =

American politician

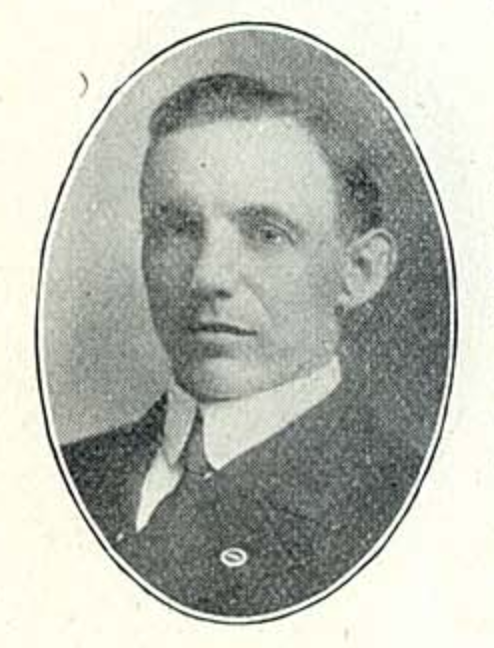
Edward Zinn, Milwaukee Socialist engineer and legislator

Edward H. Zinn (July 30, 1877 – May 19, 1920) was an American mechanical engineer, tax assessment clerk and Socialist from Milwaukee, Wisconsin who served two terms (1913–1916) as a member of the Wisconsin State Assembly representing the 7th Milwaukee County Assembly district (7th and 10th wards of the city of Milwaukee.

== Background ==
Zinn was born in Milwaukee, July 30, 1877. He graduated from local public schools and attended engineering school. He became a mechanical engineer apprentice for Pawling & Harnischfeger Company, moving in 1897 to Allis-Chalmers and later with other engineering concerns of Milwaukee. In 1910 he was appointed special assessment clerk in the Department of Public Works of the City of Milwaukee but in 1912 returned to engineering.

As of 1911, he was President of the North Division Neighborhood Center in the neighborhood around North Division High School.

== Assembly career ==
He was elected to the Assembly on the ticket of the Social Democratic Party (as the party was still known in Wisconsin) in 1912, receiving 2,215 votes to 1,794 for Democrat Frank Muench, 1,117 for Republican Edward Wunderlich, and 32 for Prohibitionist George Zinnern, succeeding fellow Socialist Arthur Kahn. He was appointed to the standing committee on taxation He was re-elected in the 1914 election, with 1889 votes to 1446 for Republican A. W. Hinkel and 775 for Democrat Charles Olbrogge; he then transferred to the Committee on Municipalities.

He did not run for re-election in 1916, and was succeeded by Republican Bernhard Gettelman.

He continued to work as an engineer until his death on May 19, 1920.
