= Wisconsin Vorwärts =

Wisconsin Vorwärts ("Wisconsin Forward") was a German language newspaper published in Milwaukee, Wisconsin from 1892 to 1932. The newspaper was an organ of the Social-Democratic Party of Wisconsin, with Victor L. Berger as the founding editor. The offices of the newspaper were located at 530 Chestnut Street, Milwaukee.
