= M. W. Kalaher =

American politician

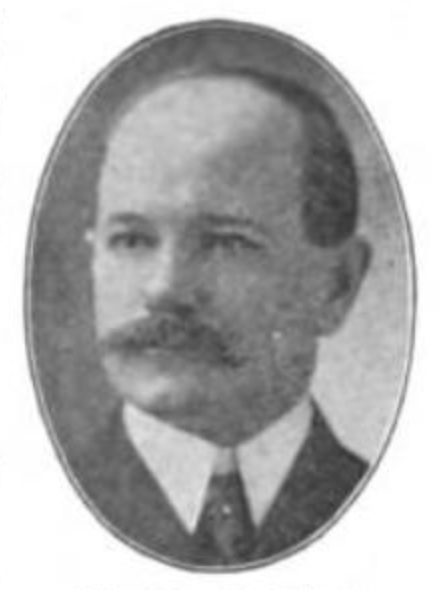

Member of the Wisconsin State Assembly
- In office 1908–1910
- Constituency: Milwaukee County Fifth District

Personal details
- Born: Michael W. Kalaher; June 22, 1870 Walworth County, Wisconsin
- Died: February 12, 1957 (aged 86) Milwaukee, Wisconsin
- Resting place: Holy Cross Cemetery
- Party: Democratic
- Spouse: Ella Charlotte Dassler (m. 1908)
- Children: 1
- Education: University of Wisconsin
- Occupation: Lawyer, teacher, politician

Michael W. Kalaher (June 22, 1870 – February 12, 1957) was a member of the Wisconsin State Assembly.

== Biography ==
M. W. Kalaher was born on June 22, 1870, in Walworth County, Wisconsin, and attended high school in Lake Geneva. He graduated from the University of Wisconsin, and became a high school teacher and principal in Manitowoc. In 1906, he moved to Milwaukee, where he practiced law.

== Political career ==
Kalaher was elected to the Assembly for Milwaukee County's Fifth District in 1908. He succeeded William Alldridge. He was a Democrat.

== Personal life ==
He married Ella Charlotte Dassler in Manitowoc on September 2, 1908. They had one son.

M. W. Kalaher died at Deaconess Hospital in Milwaukee on February 12, 1957. He was buried in Holy Cross Cemetery.
