= Sewer socialism =

Historical political movement in Wisconsin, United States

Sewer socialism was an American socialist movement that centered in Milwaukee, Wisconsin, from around 1892 to 1960. The moniker was coined by Morris Hillquit at the 1932 Milwaukee convention of the Socialist Party of America and was intended as a pejorative, commenting on the Milwaukee socialists and their perpetual boasting about the excellent public sewer system in the city. However, the term has grown to have a more complimentary and even aspirational meaning. It has become synonymous with pragmatic socialist policies of building public infrastructure, expanding public programs, cutting waste, and committing to efficient, functional government.

Modern day socialists have evoked sewer socialism and the legacy of the Milwaukee socialists when describing their political projects and strategies. New York City Mayor Zohran Mamdani, a democratic socialist, has referred to this modern approach as "pothole politics".

== Background ==
With the creation of the Socialist Party of America, Sewer Socialists formed the core of an element that favored reformism rather than revolution, de-emphasizing social theory and revolutionary rhetoric in favor of creating honest government and implementing social works to improve public health. Milwaukee's socialist party was heavily influenced by the Turners, a progressive German-American gymnastic movement which began in the mid 19th-century. Although centered on physical fitness, Turners promoted liberal, intellectual political engagement. The sewer socialists fought to clean up what they saw as "the dirty and polluted legacy of the Industrial Revolution", cleaning up neighborhoods and factories with new sanitation systems, city-owned water and power systems and improved education. This approach is sometimes called "constructive socialism". The movement has its origins in the organization of the Social Democratic Party, a precursor to the Socialist Party of America. Even before the creation of the Social Democratic Party, Milwaukee had elected socialist millwright Henry Smith (who had been elected to the legislature under the "Socialist" label) to Congress on the Union Labor ticket in 1886.

== Victor Berger and Meta Berger ==
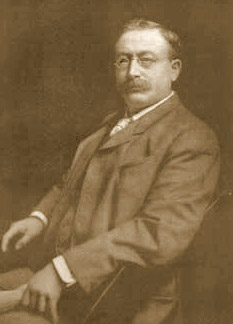
Victor L. Berger, Representative of Wisconsin's 5th district in the 61st and 67th–72nd Congresses

Victor L. Berger, a Milwaukee schoolteacher, was one of the founders of sewer socialism and has often been compared to Robert La Follette. Berger was an Austrian Jewish immigrant who published English and German daily newspapers, distributing free copies to every household in Milwaukee before elections. He was frustrated by the living and working conditions he found in Milwaukee, which motivated him to become a socialist in 1892. Inspired by German Socialist politics, he later attempted to form a similar socialist party in Milwaukee. In 1895, he conferred with labor leader Eugene V. Debs, who soon after helped him found the Socialist Democratic Party of America in 1898. Berger was less concerned with resolving ideological differences, as he was with providing quality governmental services. Even before the American Socialist Party’s Milwaukee already had longstanding traditions of participating in unions and having a vocal workforce, and Berger sought to adapt these unions to new socialist principles. In 1899, after years of influence, Milwaukee’s Federated Trades Council elected an entirely socialist executive committee, which included Berger. His wife, Meta Berger, was also a prominent socialist activist. In 1910, he became the first of two 20th-century Socialists elected to the House of Representatives, representing Wisconsin's 5th congressional district (the second was Meyer London of New York). Berger was reelected in 1918, but he was barred from his seat in the House because of his trial and conviction under the 1917 Espionage Act for his public remarks opposing intervention in World War I. A special election was called in which Berger again emerged victorious, but Congress denied him the seat and it was declared vacant. Although initially maintaining only one term in Congress, he later went on to win reelection to the House in 1922, in which he served until 1929 and during his tenure introduced proposals for numerous programs that were subsequently adopted, such as old age pensions, unemployment insurance and public housing. Positions advanced by Meta Berger which proved successful included "penny lunches", medical exams for children, and improved working conditions and wages for teachers. Shifting cultural norms following World War I greatly diminished the Socialist Party’s influence on both the state and the nation as a whole, however Milwaukee voters continued to support the party. Between 1910 and 1960, three socialist mayors were elected within the city.

== Electoral success ==
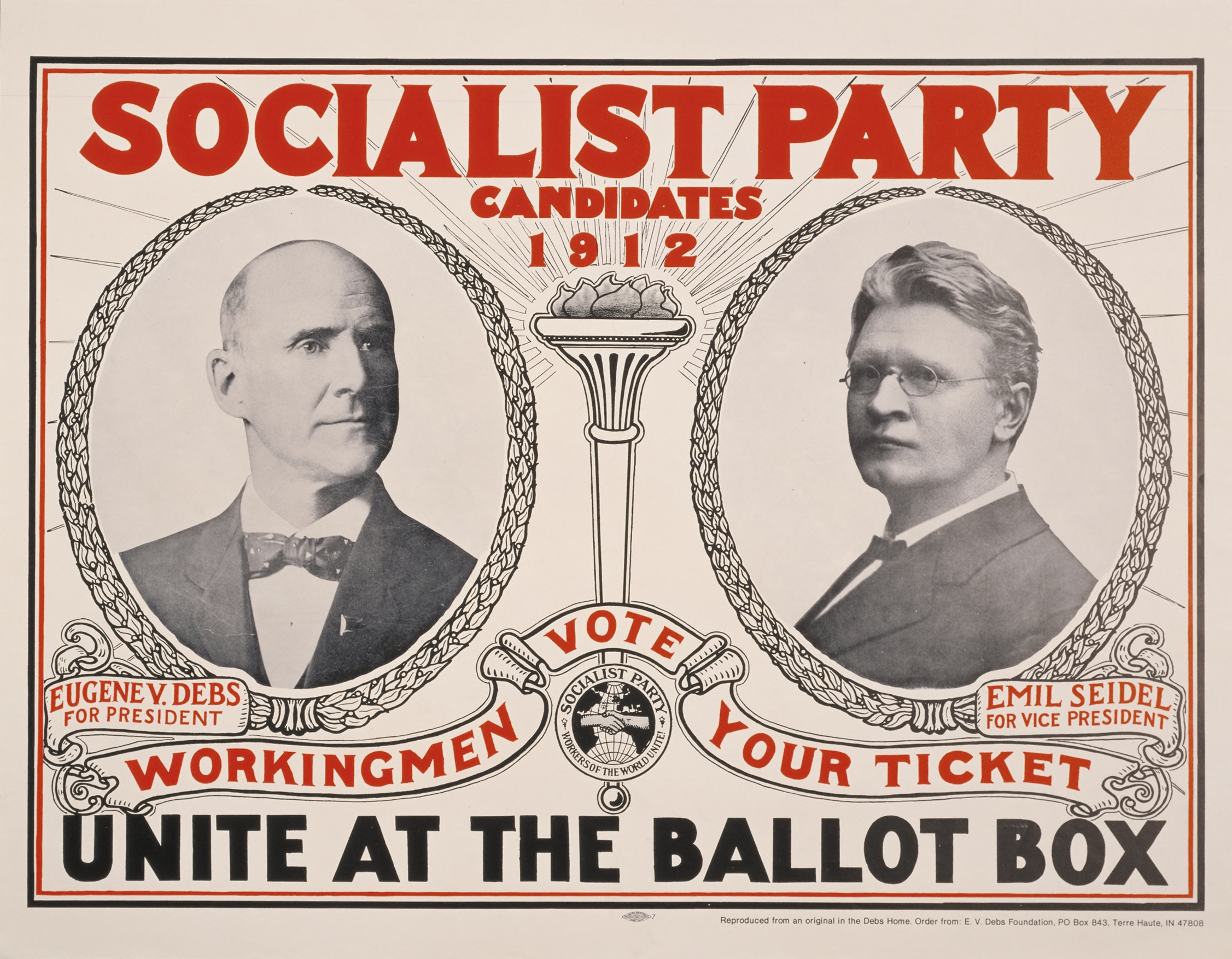
Campaign poster from the 1912 United States presidential election where Emil Seidel was the running mate of Eugene V. Debs

In the 1900s, no other city within the U.S. saw as many socialist electoral successes as did Milwaukee. In 1910, the same year as Victor Bergers’s election as the first socialist to sit in the U.S. House of Representatives, the Socialists won most of the seats in the Milwaukee city council and county board. This included the first Socialist mayor in the United States, Emil Seidel, who also received the nomination for Vice President on the Socialist Party of America ticket in the 1912 election when the Socialists netted 6% of the vote, their highest-ever percentage. Seidel and Berger both lost their campaigns in 1912, but in 1916 a new socialist mayor was elected, Daniel Hoan, who remained in office for 24 years until 1940. During his time in office, Hoan supervised the establishment of Milwaukee County’s parks system . One of the primary factors in the Sewer Socialist’s achievements was their relationship with the Milwaukee Trade Unions. This support was evident during Berger’s 1918 Senate Campaign for which Frank J Weber, a prominent labor leader in Wisconsin, issued an inscription on Berger’s campaign posters claiming to be authorized by Weber. Socialists never regained total control over the local government as they did in 1910, but they continued to show major influence until the defeat of Daniel Hoan in 1940. The sewer socialists elected one more mayor in Milwaukee, Frank Zeidler, who served for three terms (1948–1960). Following Zeidler's tenure, socialist parties had limited success in mayoral elections in major American cities. Independent democratic socialist Bernie Sanders was elected mayor of Burlington, Vermont in 1981. In the Democratic Party primary for the 2021 Buffalo mayoral election, self-identified socialist India Walton scored an upset victory over incumbent Byron Brown. However, Brown went on to defeat Walton in the general election as a write-in candidate. In November 2025, Zohran Mamdani, a member of both the Democratic Socialists of America and the Democratic Party (United States) was elected mayor of New York City, becoming the first member of a socialist political organization to be elected mayor of a major American city since Zeidler.

In 2022, Milwaukee elected two democratic socialists to the Wisconsin State Assembly, Darrin Madison and Ryan Clancy. Madison and Clancy, who are both members of the Democratic Party, announced they would form an informal Socialist Caucus, the first of its kind in Wisconsin since 1931.

== Relationship with the Wisconsin Progressive Party ==
Although the Socialists had many ideas and policies similar to those of the Wisconsin Progressives, tensions still existed between the two groups because of their differing ideologies. Socialist Assemblyman George L. Tews, during a 1932 debate on unemployment compensation and how to fund it, argued for the Socialist bill and against the Progressive substitute, stating that a Progressive was "a Socialist with the brains knocked out". Although, as a rule, the Progressives and Socialists did not run candidates against each other in Milwaukee, they rarely co-operated on elections. One notable exception was the 1924 presidential campaign of Robert La Follette, who was endorsed by the Socialist Party of America. A factor that affected this lack of collaboration was the relationship of each party to the Republican Party. Socialists were outright opposed to the party, while the Progressives sometimes worked with their parent party.

After the death of Congressman Victor Berger in 1929, State Senator Thomas Duncan was considered his successor as leader of the Wisconsin socialists. In a controversial move, Republican Governor Philip La Follette appointed Duncan his executive secretary in 1931, and he quickly became a member of La Follette's inner circle. Duncan was seen as less doctrinaire than Berger, and in 1932 was asserted to have (unsuccessfully) led efforts to lure the Socialists into the La Follette camp. Three years later, however, Duncan was able to orchestrate the formation of the Wisconsin Farmer-Labor Progressive Federation, a coalition made up of the Progressive Party, the Socialist Party, the Farmer-Labor Progressive League, the Wisconsin State Federation of Labor, and several other labor and farmers' groups. Duncan was able to convince the socialists to give up their ballot access in exchange for reserving certain seats for socialists running under the Progressive ticket.

== Modern usage ==
In 1961, Progressive editor William Evjue wrote of the Wisconsin Socialist legislators he had known by saying: "They never were approached by the lobbyists, because the lobbyists knew it was not possible to influence these men. They were incorruptible."

In 2022, when union organizer Juan Miguel Martinez was elected to join incumbent Ryan Clancy as the second self-proclaimed socialist member of the eighteen-member Milwaukee County board of supervisors (both had been endorsed by the Milwaukee chapter of the Democratic Socialists of America), Martinez and Clancy both cited the sewer socialists as part of the heritage on which they seek to build.

The policies of Zohran Mamdani have also been compared to sewer socialism. In a speech at the Knockdown Center marking his first 100 days as Mayor of New York City, Mamdani described his administration's focus on municipal services as "pothole politics". Mamdani called this approach "our 2026 answer to sewer socialism" and highlighted efforts such as filling 100,000 potholes, increasing garbage containerization, and modernizing catch basins to show how government can deliver public goods.. After Mamdani announced an initiative to open the opera to the public, Fox News inverted the sewer socialism title and disparagingly labeled his approach "Opera Socialism".

== See also ==
- Jasper McLevy
- Municipal socialism
- Progressivism in the United States
- Milwaukee Metropolitan Sewerage District
  - Milorganite
