= Frank and Doris Hursley =

American screenwriters (1902–1989, 1898–1984)

- Occupation: Screenwriting duo
- Known for: Have Gun, Will Travel; Search for Tomorrow; General Hospital
- Frank Hursley
- Birth Name: Frank M. Hursley
- Born: November 21, 1902; Canada
- Died: February 3, 1989 (aged 86); Santa Barbara, California, United States
- Family: Bridget Dobson (daughter)
- Doris Hursley
- Born: September 29, 1898; Milwaukee, Wisconsin United States
- Died: May 5, 1984 (aged 85); Santa Barbara, California, United States
- Parents: Victor L. Berger; Meta Berger

Frank and Doris Hursley were an American husband-and-wife television screenwriting duo, comprising Frank M. Hursley (November 21, 1902 – February 3, 1989) and Doris Hursley (September 29, 1898 – May 5, 1984) they were best known for their serials, especially the medical drama General Hospital.

== Career ==
The couple were writers on the Western series Have Gun, Will Travel, but became famous in the soap world in 1957 when they began writing for the CBS Daytime show Search for Tomorrow.

They continued to write for it even after co-creating a new show, General Hospital, in 1963. (Another married writing team, Theodore and Mathilde Ferro, wrote the show in its early months.) This medical drama was the first serious effort by ABC Daytime to create a daytime serial. Today, General Hospital is the longest-running daytime serial on American television. The duo head wrote the show until 1973, when they handed the reins to their daughter and son-in-law, Bridget and Jerome Dobson.

In 1969, the Hursleys created and wrote the NBC Daytime soap opera Bright Promise that starred Dana Andrews as college president Tom Boswell. However, they soon left that series and it was eventually cancelled in 1972.

The Hursleys retired from writing serials in 1973.

=== Credits ===
Love, American Style, Wagon Train, Have Gun – Will Travel, Whirlybirds, The Adventures of Jim Bowie, The Millionaire, Dr. Christian, Lassie, Matinee Theatre, The 20th Century-Fox Hour, The Moon is Blue

=== Awards/nominations ===
Frank and Doris were nominated for a Daytime Emmy Awards in 1974. They shared this nomination with their daughters Bridget (Dobson) and Deborah (Hardy).

=== Lawsuit ===
In April, 2011, the Hursleys' daughters filed a lawsuit against ABC over unpaid royalties. They claim that their parents struck a deal with ABC years earlier to reap 10% of all profits from the syndication of the show, but allege that ABC failed to pay the full amount owed to the creators. The lawsuit was ultimately settled out of court.

== Personal lives ==
Doris Berger was the eldest daughter of Socialist Congressman Victor Berger and Socialist organizer/feminist Meta Berger and held a law degree from Marquette University.

Frank Hursley was a graduate of the University of Michigan (A.B. 1925). He left his first wife, Madeleine, and their one-year-old son, Frank Jr., both of Detroit, and became an English professor at the University of Wisconsin's Milwaukee Extension.

After Doris's divorce in 1935 from her first husband, Colin Welles, she married Frank Hursley in 1936. The couple began writing for radio during World War II and moved from their home in Thiensville, Wisconsin, to California in 1946.

Their daughter Bridget (1938–2024) became a television writer, creating soap opera Santa Barbara.
