= 1918 United States Senate special election in Wisconsin =

- April 2, 1918
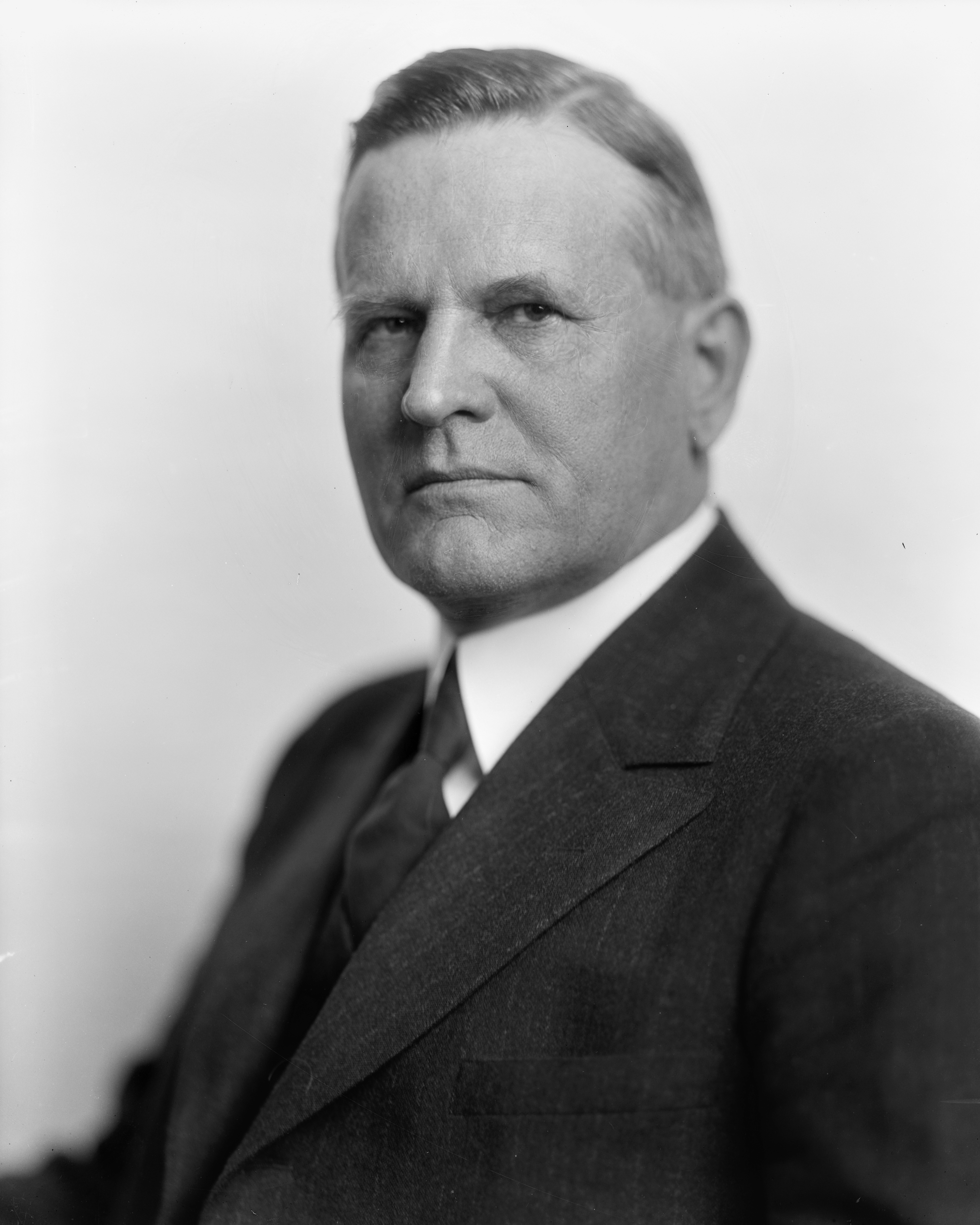

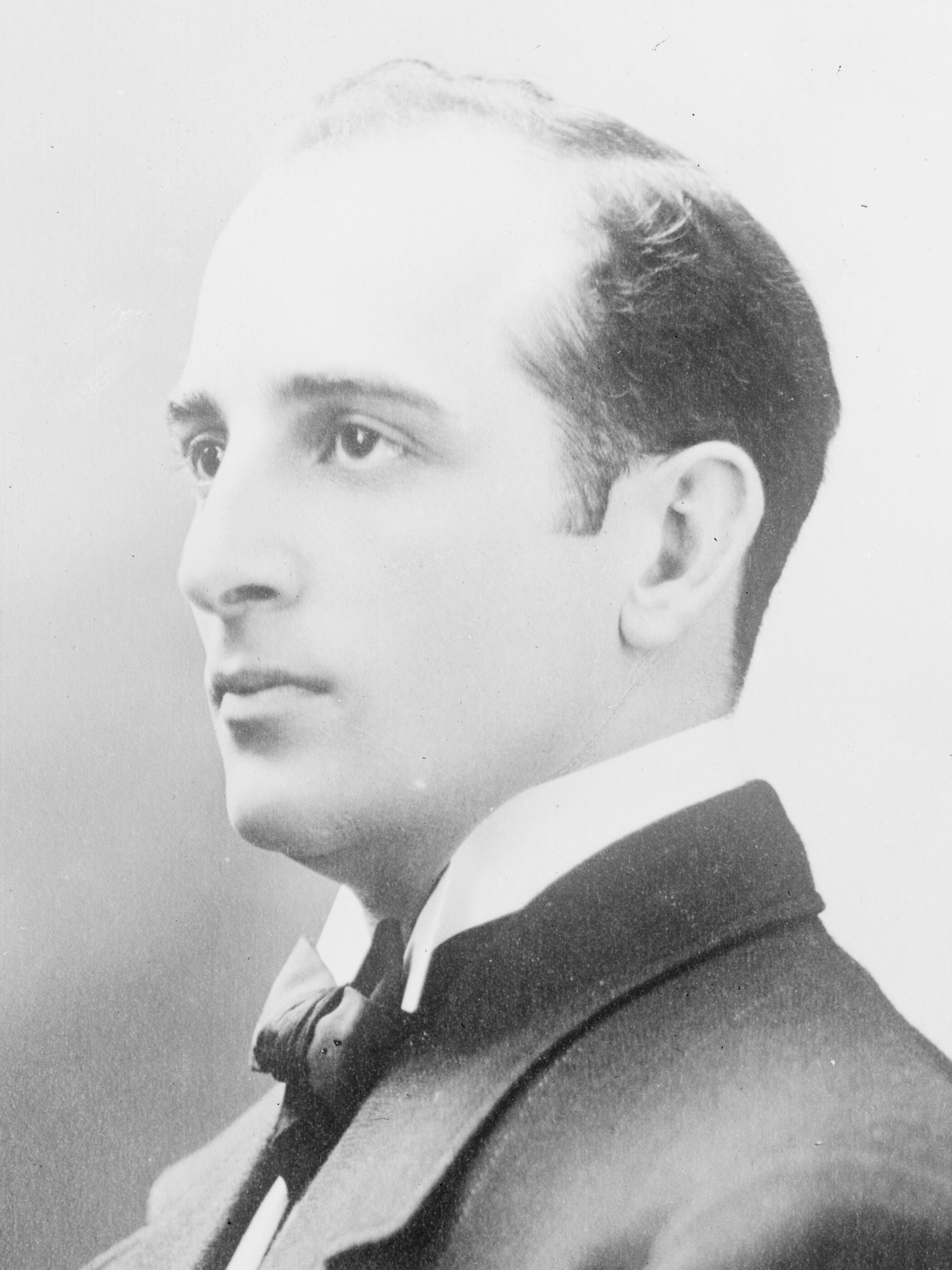

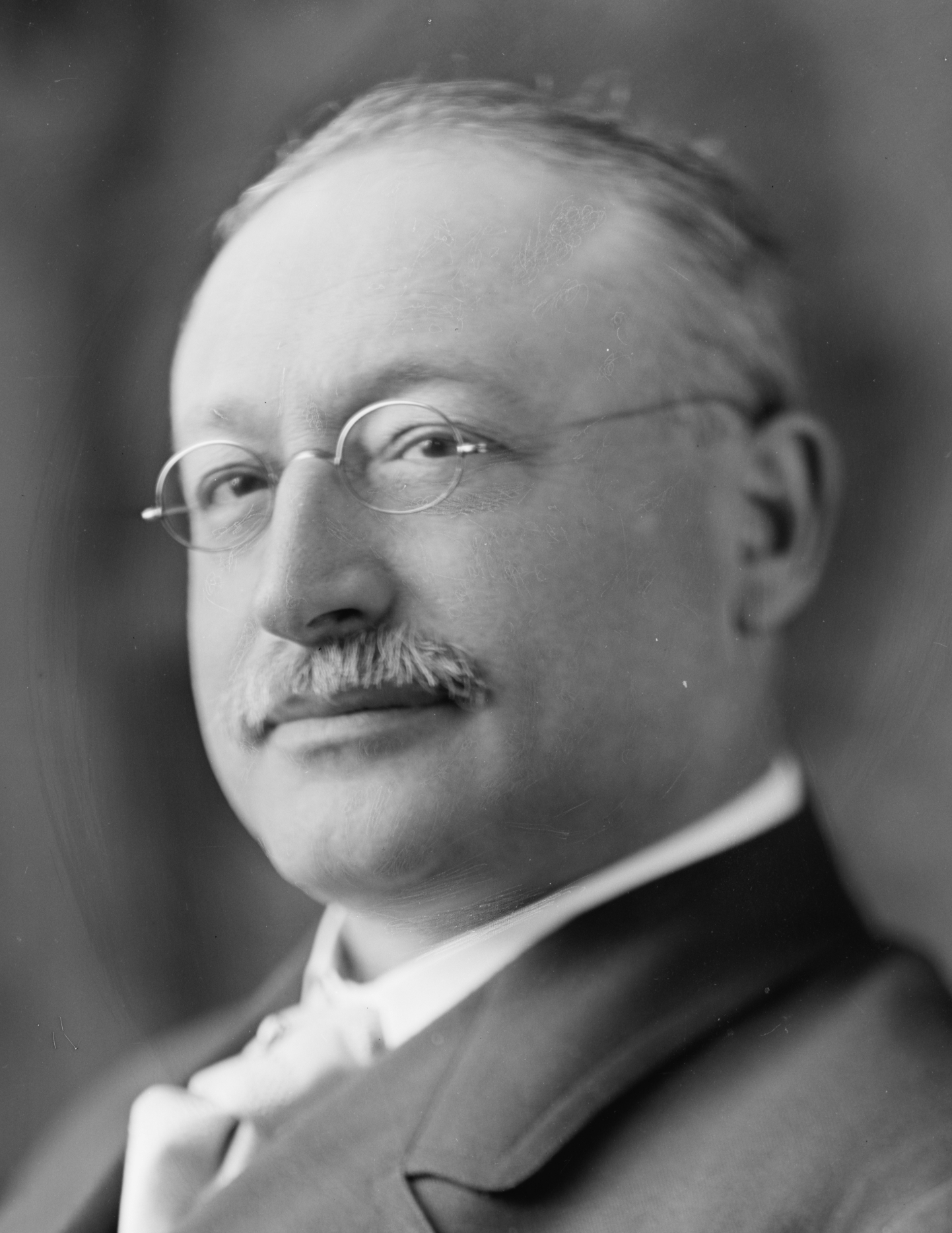
Nominee	Irvine Lenroot	Joseph Davies	Victor Berger
Party	Republican	Democratic	Social-Democratic
Popular vote	163,983	148,923	110,487
Percentage	38.73%	35.12%	26.09%
- County results Lenroot: 30–40% 40–50% 50–60% 60–70% Davies: 30–40% 40–50% 50–60% Berger: 30–40% 40–50% 50–60%
U.S. senator before election
Paul O. Husting
Democratic
Elected U.S. senator
Irvine Lenroot
Republican

The 1918 United States Senate special election in Wisconsin was held on April 2, 1918. Incumbent Democrat Senator Paul O. Husting was killed in a hunting accident the previous year.

Republican U.S. Representative Irvine Lenroot defeated Democratic Federal Trade Commission Chairman Joseph E. Davies and Social-Democratic former Congressman Victor L. Berger.

Primary elections were held on March 19. Davies easily defeated progressive reformer Charles McCarthy for the Democratic nomination, while Lenroot narrowly defeated James Thompson, a progressive district attorney and ally of Senator Robert M. La Follette, for the Republican nomination by a margin of less than three thousand votes.

As of 2022, this is the last time an open election was held for Wisconsin's Class 3 Senate seat.

== Background ==
Incumbent Senator Paul O. Husting was shot and killed by his brother Gustav in a hunting accident on October 21, 1917. Husting had been elected in 1914 and his term in office was set to expire in 1921.

A special election to complete Husting's unexpired term was scheduled for April 2, 1918. Although Governor Emanuel L. Philipp had the power under Wisconsin law to appoint a temporary successor until one could be duly elected, the seat remained vacant until the election.

The election held national importance because following Husting's death, the United States Senate was composed of 48 Republicans and 47 Democrats. Thus, whichever party won the Wisconsin special election would control the Senate for the remainder of the 65th United States Congress. (Note: Republicans would retain their majority with a victory, while Democrats would gain an effective majority by virtue of the tiebreaking vote of Vice President Thomas R. Marshall.) The election was also held during wartime, as the United States had formally entered into World War I on April 6, 1917, and major U.S. operations in Europe were set to begin in the summer of 1918. Wisconsin, a state long defined by its progressive politics and home to a large ethnically German population, had been branded a "hotbed of sedition."

== Democratic primary ==
=== Candidates ===
- Joseph E. Davies, chair of the Federal Trade Commission
- Charles McCarthy, progressive author of the Wisconsin Idea and aide to Herbert Hoover

=== Campaign ===
Joseph E. Davies ran at the personal request of President Woodrow Wilson, who hoped to win the seat and thus control of the Senate for his party. Davies, who had run Wilson's campaign in the Midwest in 1916, resigned from the new Federal Trade Commission to join the race.

=== Results ===
1918 Democratic U.S. Senate special primary
Party	Candidate	Votes	%
Democratic	Joseph E. Davies	57,282	80.60%
Democratic	Charles McCarthy	13,784	19.40%
Total votes		71,066	100.00%

== Republican primary ==
=== Candidates ===
- Irvine Lenroot, U.S. Representative from Superior
- James Thompson, former La Crosse County district attorney

=== Results ===
1918 Republican U.S. Senate special primary
Party	Candidate	Votes	%
Republican	Irvine Lenroot	73,186	50.84%
Republican	James Thompson	70,772	49.16%
Total votes		143,958	100.00%

== Social-Democratic primary ==
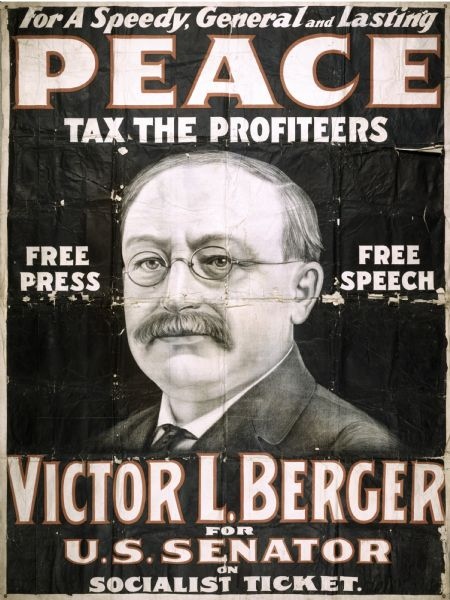
Campaign poster for Congressman Victor L. Berger

=== Candidates ===
- Victor Berger, former U.S. Representative from Milwaukee

=== Campaign ===
Berger, a leader of the Social-Democratic Party in Milwaukee and of its national pragmatic wing, faced no opposition from within his party for the nomination for Senator. For him, most of the primary campaign was focused on opposition from federal law enforcement. Berger dismissed the war as "a capitalist war caused chiefly by the struggle between Great Britain and Germany for the world market" and published several editorials opposing American entry in his newspaper, the Milwaukee Leader. In the fall of 1917, federal authorities revoked the Leader's second-class mailing privileges.

Shortly before the primary in February, Berger and three other Social-Democrats were indicted for alleged violations of the Espionage Act. Nevertheless, he remained in the race and advanced to the general election.

=== Results ===
1918 Social-Democratic U.S. Senate special primary
Party	Candidate	Votes	%
Social-Democratic	Victor Berger	38,564	100.00%
Total votes		38,564	100.00%

== General election ==
=== Candidates ===
- Irvine Lenroot, U.S. Representative from Superior (Republican)
- Joseph E. Davies, chair of the Federal Trade Commission (Democratic)
- Victor L. Berger, former U.S. Representative from Milwaukee (Social-Democratic)
- Anthony J. Benjamin (Prohibition)

=== Campaign ===
Berger ran on the Social-Democratic platform with his calls for protection of "freedom of speech, freedom of press and freedom of assemblage," which received increased attention in light of his indictment. His Social-Democratic platform also called for "an early, general, lasting and democratic peace," "compelling the profiteers of the war to pay the cost of the war," and "national ownership of trusts and ... public ownership of public utilities."

=== Results ===
1918 United States Senate special election in Wisconsin
Party	Candidate	Votes	%
Republican	Irvine Lenroot	163,983	38.73
Democratic	Joseph E. Davies	148,923	35.12
Social-Democratic	Victor L. Berger	110,487	26.09
Prohibition	Anthony J. Benjamin	233	0.06
Write-in	Scattering	371	0.06
Majority		15,060	3.61
Total votes		423,997	100.00
Republican gain from Democratic			
