= Ernest Untermann =

German-American writer and translator (1864–1956)

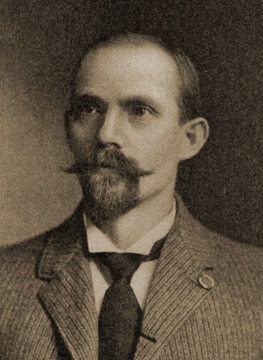
- Untermann in 1902
- Born: Gerhard Ernest Untermann; November 6, 1864; Soldin, Brandenburg, Kingdom of Prussia (now Poland)
- Died: January 5, 1956 (aged 91)
- Citizenship: Prussia; German Empire (from 1871); United States (from 1893)

Gerhard Ernest Untermann, Sr. (November 6, 1864 – January 5, 1956) was a German-American seaman, socialist author, translator, and newspaper editor. In his later life he was Director of the old Washington Park Zoo in Milwaukee, a geologist, fossil hunter, and artist.

== Biography ==
=== Early years ===
Ernest was born in what was then Soldin, Brandenburg, Kingdom of Prussia on November 6, 1864. He studied geology and paleontology at the University of Berlin. He later wrote that after graduating, he was "drafted into the great army of the unemployed before I had done a stroke of useful work. Society had trained me for intellectual tasks, but had failed to provide for employment." Untermann took work as a deckhand on a German steamer sailing to New York City, thus bringing him to America for the first time. He subsequently made several trips around the world, working on German, Spanish, and American sailing vessels. In the course of his nautical adventures, he was shipwrecked three times, which exposed him to life in the Philippine Islands and China. In the third incident, he narrowly survived when his own vessel went down in the North Sea.

Following these events, Untermann served briefly in the German military, an interlude which he recalled as decisive in his political radicalization:

"I had learned the truth of economic determinism and of the class struggle without knowing these terms. But I still clung to the illusion of patriotism. The drillmasters of Billy the Versatile cured me of that. The class line in all its brutal nakedness became visible to me. The tyrannical and insolent arrogance of the demigods with shoulder straps roused my spirit of independence to its climax. An affront, a blow, a courtmartial, closed my military career and fixed in my mind one aim — the abolition of the ruling class."

Untermann returned to the University of Berlin for post graduate courses, but later said this only "showed me the rottenness of the intellectual elite of Germany." Still, it was at this time that he came into contact with the Social Democratic newspaper Vorwärts ("Forward") and various other Marxist books and leaflets, which gave concrete political form to his emerging radicalism.

Untermann immigrated to America and joined the United States Merchant Marine, spending the next ten years on board ships plying the South Seas trade routes. He became a U.S. citizen in 1893.

=== Socialist years ===
Untermann was a member of the Socialist Labor Party of America (SLP) in the 1890s before leaving to join the Socialist Party of America (SPA). He was a regular contributor to Algie Simons' dissident SLP newspaper The Workers Call. When Simons moved to Chicago in 1900 to assume the editorship of International Socialist Review—a monthly published by the Marxist publishing house, Charles H. Kerr & Co.—Untermann became a regular contributor to that publication as well. In 1903 he worked as associate editor of J.A. Wayland's mass circulation socialist weekly, The Appeal to Reason.

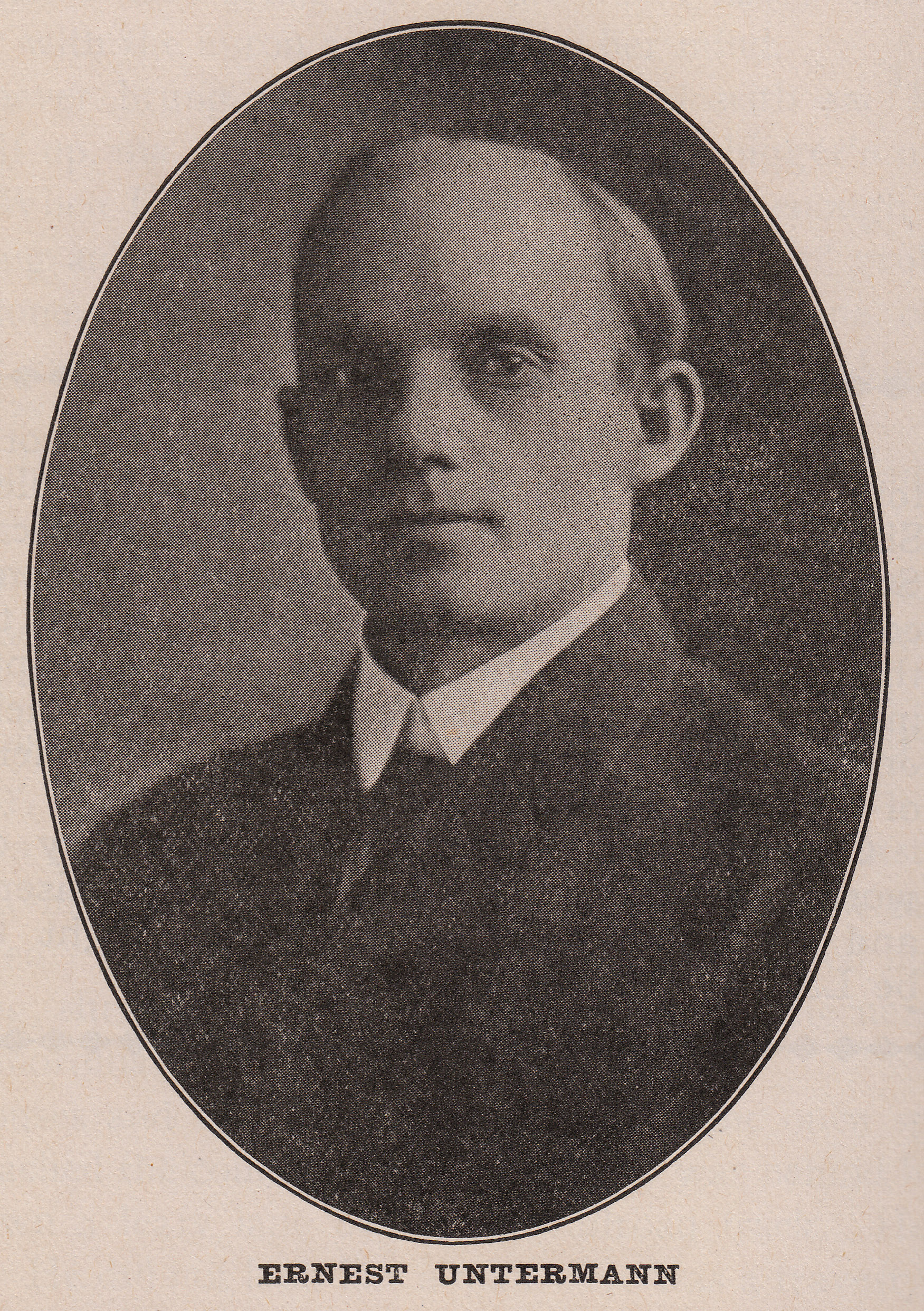
Ernest Untermann in 1909.

Untermann was the first American translator of Karl Marx's Das Kapital, beginning work on the massive project in the spring of 1905 while living on a chicken farm in Orlando, Florida and completing translations of volumes 2 and 3 for Kerr in 1907 and 1909, respectively. He also translated other socialist works for an American audience, including the memoirs of Wilhelm Liebknecht and August Bebel as well as The Origin of the Family, Private Property, and the State, by Frederick Engels. In addition to translations from German and Italian, Untermann wrote original works on Economics and Natural History. His books included Science and Revolution (1905), The World's Revolutions (1906), and Marxian Economics: A Popular Introduction to the Three Volumes of Marx's Capital (1907).

Untermann professed an adherence to the thinking of Karl Kautsky and Joseph Dietzgen. He held that science had a class basis and drew very radical conclusions from this premise without hesitation or pulling of punches, writing in his 1905 book, Science and Revolution, that

"I speak as a proletarian and a socialist. I make no pretense to be a scientist without class affiliation. There has never been any science which was not made possible, and which was not influenced, by the economic and class environment of the various scientists. I am, indeed, aware of the fact that there are certain general facts in all sciences which apply to all mankind regardless of classes. But I am also aware of the other fact, that the concrete application of any general scientific truth to different historical conditions and men varies considerably, because abstract truths have a general applicability only under abstract conditions, but are more or less modified in the contact with concrete environments."

Untermann further indicated that "bourgeois science" was perpetually under assault in capitalist society and that "university professors have learned to their bitter disappointment that freedom of science is little respected when it runs counter to freedom of trade." Hence:

"Under these circumstances, the proletariat cannot place any reliance on bourgeois science. it must and will maintain a critical attitude toward all bourgeois science, and accept nothing that does not stand the test of proletarian standards.

"So far as bourgeois science coincides with the findings of proletarian science, we shall gladly accept and foster every truth... But we shall on our part reject everything which tends to strengthen the ruling class, endanger the progress of the proletarian revolution, or interfere with the advance of human knowledge and control of natural forces in general."

Rather unsurprisingly, his Science and Revolution was translated into Russian and published in Soviet Ukraine in 1923.

Untermann was on the National Executive Committee of the Socialist Party of America from 1908 to 1910. He was the Socialist candidate for governor of Idaho in 1908 and 1910, and for U.S. senator from California in 1914. He strongly supported the affiliated unions of the AF of L and opposed the radical labor militancy of the Industrial Workers of the World. His anti-syndicalist perspective became more pronounced over time. He declared in a 1913 polemical article that a crisis approached during which "it will be impossible to avoid the expulsion of individuals who through word and deed confess that they are not in harmony with the fundamental principles of the [socialist] organization."

Untermann was a delegate to the 1910 "National Congress" and 1912 National Convention of the Socialist Party, chairing the organization's Committee on Immigration. He was a chief author, along with Joshua Wanhope (1863–1945), of a resolution on immigration which was pro-exclusionary — called "racist" by its critics — backing the AF of L in its desire to stop manufacturers from importing cheap, non-union labor from the Far East. Untermann and Wanhope were joined as a majority on this point by journalist Robert Hunter and J. Stitt Wilson of California.

John Spargo, Meyer London, and Leo Laukki (1880–1938) were the minority on this committee, opposing exclusionism. Untermann and Wanhope's majority proposal was effectively killed by the convention on motion by Charles Solomon of New York not to receive the committee's report, but rather to hold the matter open for further investigation and final decision by the next party convention, scheduled for four years hence.

Untermann later served as Foreign Editor of Victor Berger's socialist daily, the Milwaukee Leader, during World War I and from 1921 to 1929. Untermann wrote the editorials pertaining to international affairs, while John M. Work wrote the editorials on domestic affairs.

=== Post-radical years ===
Untermann was also a painter of great accomplishment, specializing in landscapes and prehistoric flora and fauna. He was known as "The Artist of the Uintas". He contributed paintings, murals, and panels to the Dinosaur National Monument, the old Utah Field House of Natural History State Park Museum and has a large collection of paintings at the new Utah Field House of Natural History State Park Museum in Vernal, Utah. His interest in paleontology and Geology led to his moving to Vernal, Utah.

Untermann died in Vernal on January 5, 1956.

Untermann's papers are housed at two institutions, the Wisconsin Historical Society in Madison, Wisconsin, and the University of Utah Library, Special Collections, in Salt Lake City.

== Selected works ==
=== Books and pamphlets ===
- Municipality: From Capitalism to Socialism. Girard, KS: Appeal to Reason, 1902.
- Religion and Politics. Girard, KS: Appeal to Reason, c. 1904.
- Socialism: A New World Movement. Girard, KS: Appeal to Reason, 1904.
- Science and Revolution. Chicago: Charles H. Kerr & Co., 1905.
- Socialism vs. Single Tax: A Verbatim Report of a Debate held at Twelfth Street, Turner Hall, Chicago, December 20th, 1905. With Louis F. Post. Chicago: Charles H. Kerr & Co., n.d. [1906].
- The World's Revolutions. (1906) Chicago: Charles H. Kerr & Co., 1909.
- Marxian Economics: A Popular Introduction to the Three Volumes of Marx's Capital. Chicago: Charles H. Kerr & Co., 1907.
- Die Logischen Mängel des Engeren Marxismus. Georg Plechanow et alii gegen Josef Dietzgen. Berlin: Verlag der Dietzgenschen Philosophie, 1910.
- Popular Guide to the Geology of Dinosaur National Monument.

=== Articles ===
- "The American Farmer and the Socialist Party", The Socialist [Seattle], part 1: no. 143 (May 3, 1903), pg. 2; part 2: no. 144 (May 10, 1903), pg. 2; part 3: no. 145 (May 17, 1903), pp. 2, 4; part 4: no. 147 (May 31, 1903), pg. 2. part 5: no. 149 (June 14, 1903), pg. 2; part 6: no. 153, pg. 3.; part 7 (conclusion): no. 156 (August 5, 1903), pg. 2.
- "How I Became a Socialist", The Comrade, v. 2, no. 3 (Dec. 1902), p. 62.
- "Marxism and Revisionism", The Worker, vol. 14, no. 6, (May 8, 1904), pg. 8.
- "The Socialist Party and the Trade Unions", The Worker [New York], vol. 16, no. 5, (May 5, 1906).
- "The Third Volume of Marx's Capital", International Socialist Review, vol. 9, no. 6 (June 1909), pp. 946–958.
- "A Reply to Debs", The Social-Democratic Herald [Milwaukee], Wisconsin Edition, vol. 13, no. 16, whole no. 629 (Aug. 20, 1910), pg. 2.
- "The Immigration Question", The Social-Democratic Herald [Milwaukee], vol. 13, no. 32 (Dec. 10, 1910), pg. 2.
- "No Compromise with the IWW", St. Louis Labor, no. 624 (Jan. 18, 1913), pg. 7.

=== Translations ===
- Wilhelm Liebknecht, Karl Marx: Biographical Memoirs. Chicago: Charles H. Kerr & Co., 1901.
- Frederick Engels, The Origin of the Family, Private Property and the State. Chicago: Charles H. Kerr & Co., 1902.
- Wilhelm Bölsche, The Evolution of Man. Chicago: Charles H. Kerr & Co., 1905.
- Joseph Dietzgen, The Positive Outcome of Philosophy. Chicago: Charles H. Kerr & Co., 1906.
- Enrico Ferri, The Positive School of Criminology: Three Lectures Given at the University of Naples, Italy, on April 22, 23, and 24, 1901. Chicago: Charles H. Kerr & Co., 1906.
- M. Wilhelm Meyer, The Making of the World. Chicago: Charles H. Kerr & Co., 1906.
- Antonio Labriola, Socialism and Philosophy. Chicago: Charles H. Kerr & Co., 1907.
- August Bebel, Bebel's Reminiscences. New York: Socialist Literature Co., 1911.

== See also ==
- Social-Democratic Party of Wisconsin
