= J. Mahlon Barnes =

American trade union functionary and socialist political activist

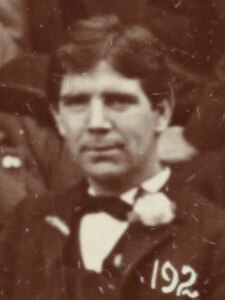
Barnes at the first Socialist Party of America convention in Chicago, 1904

John Mahlon Barnes (June 22, 1866 – February 22, 1934) was an American trade union functionary and socialist political activist. Barnes is best remembered as the Executive Secretary of the Socialist Party of America from 1905 to 1911, during which time he originated the idea of the party's 1908 "Red Special" campaign train on behalf of its Presidential nominee, Eugene V. Debs.

== Biography ==
=== Early years ===
John Mahlon Barnes, commonly known to his contemporaries as "Mahlon," was born June 22, 1866, in Lancaster, Pennsylvania, the son of a bootmaker. He attended the Soldiers' Orphan School at Mount Joy, a borough of Lancaster, from 1875 to 1882.

In 1882, the 16-year-old Mahlon moved to Philadelphia, where he obtained a job as a cigarmaker, while continuing his education by mail through a Chatauqua correspondence course. He continued to work as a cigarmaker until 1905.

In conjunction with his work as a cigarmaker, Barnes joined the Order of the Knights of Labor, then the country's largest labor union in 1884. In 1887, he left the Knights of Labor to join the Cigar Makers' International Union (CMIU), part of the rival American Federation of Labor (AF of L). Barnes served as the Secretary of Local 100 of the CMIU in Philadelphia from 1891 to 1893 and again from 1896 to 1899. In 1901 he was elected Secretary of CMIU Local 165, also in Philadelphia, continuing in that position until 1904.

Barnes was a frequent delegate of the Cigarmakers' Union to the annual conventions of the AF of L, attending 27 such gatherings between 1892 and 1921.

=== Political career ===
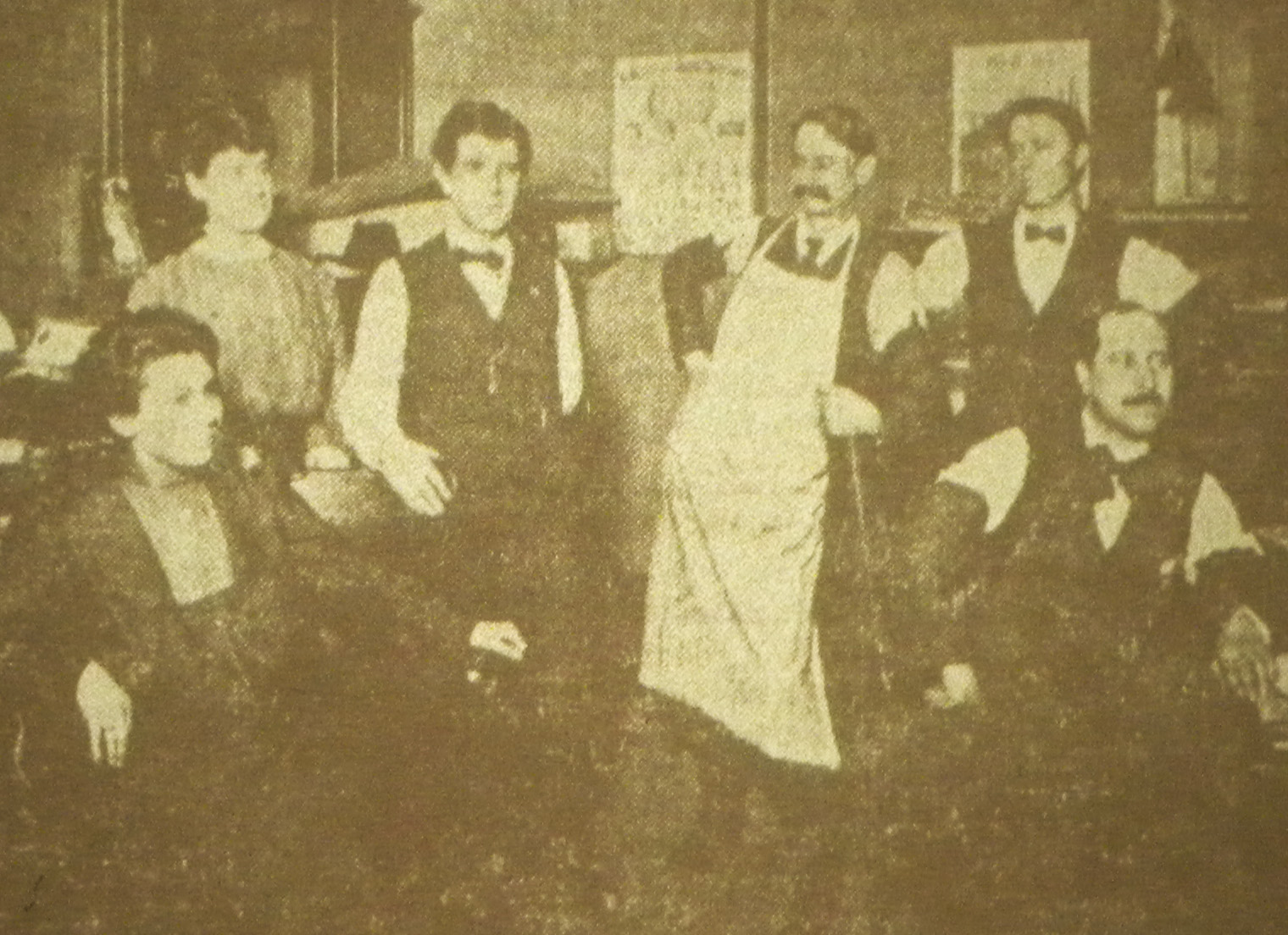
Barnes (bow-tie, standing at left) with members of the staff of the Socialist Party National Office at the time of his election as Executive Secretary in 1905.

In 1891, Barnes joined the Socialist Labor Party of America (SLP), remaining an active member of that organization until the 1899 split headed by Henry Slobodin, Morris Hillquit, and individuals close to the New Yorker Volkszeitung newspaper. During his tenure as a member of the SLP, Barnes was the Secretary of Section Philadelphia beginning in 1892 and Secretary of the SLP's Pennsylvania state organization from 1893 until his departure from the organization.

Barnes was twice a candidate for political office on behalf of the SLP, running for United States Congress in 1892 and heading the party's state ticket as its candidate for Governor of Pennsylvania in 1898.

Barnes was a founding member of the Socialist Party of America (SPA) in 1901 and a delegate to most of its national conventions. He was twice a candidate for office under the Socialist Party banner, running in 1902 for Lieutenant Governor of Pennsylvania and in 1908 for Congress in the Illinois 9th District.

In 1903 and again in 1904, Mahlon Barnes was elected as Pennsylvania's representative to the governing National Committee of the SPA.

When Socialist Party National Executive Secretary William Mailly resigned his post in January 1905, the National Committee found itself faced with selecting a successor. Mahlon Barnes was elected as Mailly's successor, effective February 1, 1905. Barnes was subsequently re-elected every year until a combination of opposition by the SPA's left wing with charges of immorality resulted in his removal in 1911.

During his time at the helm of the Socialist Party's National Office in Chicago, Barnes conceived of the idea of chartering a locomotive on behalf of the 1908 campaign of Socialist Presidential candidate Eugene V. Debs. This train carried the candidate and his support staff from city to city, and served as a platform from which Debs made scores of campaign speeches on socialist themes to enthusiastic crowds.

==== Ouster as Executive Secretary ====
The revolutionary socialist left wing of the SPA was deeply dissatisfied with Barnes as the Executive Secretary of the organization, seeing him as a willing factional ally of the electorally-oriented right wing in periodic factional skirmishes involving the party's National Office. The left long sought his removal but were unable to muster sufficient strength on the National Committee to vote the clerically-proficient and ideologically discreet Barnes out of office. Ultimately it was not the SPA's left wing, but rather publicity about alleged personal indiscretions which energized the SPA's Christian socialists against Barnes and led to his ouster.

In the summer of 1910, old-time Socialist Labor Party and Socialist Party veteran Thomas J. Morgan published a set of charges against Barnes in a weekly newspaper, The Provoker. Morgan's assistance had been sought by labor organizer Mary "Mother" Jones to force Barnes to repay a loan made by her to him previously. Barnes did not promptly repay the loan, which lead Morgan to make melodramatic accusations against Barnes, charging the party's Executive Secretary with dishonesty, incompetence, drunkenness, and the conduct of sexual affairs with National Office employees. A former employee of the National Office wrote to the party's National Executive Committee documenting the substance of some of these charges.

When the NEC refused to place the matter before the larger National Committee for action, a firestorm erupted in the Socialist Party, with Reverend Edward E. Carr, editor of the national newspaper The Christian Socialist, taking up the attack against Barnes for his alleged immoral conduct. This drumbeat of criticism forced the NEC to capitulate and in December 1910 a special investigating committee was named to explore the veracity of the charges against Barnes.

At the end of February 1911 this committee found Barnes and the NEC innocent of all misconduct.

The favorable report of the special investigating committee did not end the matter, however. The National Executive Committee declined to publish the testimony taken by the investigators, instead merely passing a resolution accepting the conclusions of the report—an action which infuriated some members of the National Committee, who sought full disclosure on the controversial matter, fearing a whitewash.

The debate raged for another six months, forcing the National Executive Committee to revisit the matter at its session in August 1911, at which it heard the direct testimony of some of the witnesses against Barnes. At the conclusion of these hearings, the NEC revealed that Barnes had placed the mother of his child—to whom he was not married—on the party payroll while at the same time deducting $2 a week from her paycheck as repayment of a $30 loan he made to her. The NEC declared Barnes guilty of a "grave indiscretion" and accepted his resignation, naming John M. Work, a member of the Right faction, as the new Executive Secretary of the organization.

==== Return to good graces ====
The "constructive socialist" wing of the Socialist Party, exemplified by party leaders Morris Hillquit and Victor L. Berger, saw the attack on Mahlon Barnes as a thinly-disguised and very unfair political hatchet job and immediately set about returning Barnes to the party's good graces as a paid functionary. In 1912, Barnes was named as campaign manager for the fourth campaign of Socialist Party journalist and orator Eugene V. Debs for President of the United States.

At the Socialist Party's 1917 Emergency National Convention in St. Louis, Missouri, Barnes was the primary author of the organization's national platform, although he did not participate in the drafting of the organization's controversial anti-militarist St. Louis Resolution against the war.

In 1919, Barnes served as head of the National League for the Release of Political Prisoners and the American Freedom Foundation, organizations launched by the Socialist Party and civil libertarians in an effort to build public pressure for political pardons of conscientious objectors languishing in prison following the conclusion of World War I.

Barnes continued to work for the Socialist Party as the business manager of the organization's propaganda weekly, The New Day, from 1920 to 1921.

After the Socialist Party's bitter split into socialist and communist wings at its 1919 Emergency National Convention, Barnes remained with the Socialists. He was elected Secretary of Local Cook County, Socialist Party—the Chicago party organization—in 1921 and served in that position through 1922.

=== Death and legacy ===
Mahlon Barnes died February 22, 1934. He was 68 years old at the time of his death.

== Works ==
- "Trades Unions: Their Logical Mission in the Propagation of Socialism: Address Delivered under the Auspices of the People’s Union, at Well’s Memorial Hall, Boston, 28 June 1896." The People [New York], July 26, 1896.
- Report of Socialist Party of the United States to the International Socialist Congress at Copenhagen, 1910. With Morris Hillquit and Victor L. Berger. Chicago : National Headquarters, Socialist Party, 1910.

== See also ==
- Socialist Party of America
