= John M. Work =

American socialist writer, lecturer, and activist

John McClelland Work
- Work in 1905
- Born: January 3, 1869; Washington County, Iowa
- Died: January 5, 1961 (aged 91); Whitefish Bay, Wisconsin
- Education: Monmouth College, B.A. George Washington University Law School, J.D.
- Occupations: Attorney, journalist, activist
- Known for: Founding member and executive secretary (1911–1913) of the Socialist Party of America

John McClelland Work (1869–1961) was an American socialist writer, lecturer, activist, and political functionary. Work is best remembered as a founding member of the Socialist Party of America and as the author of one of its best-selling propaganda tracts of the first decade of the 20th century. He was also the executive secretary of the Socialist Party of America from 1911 to 1913 and a frequent candidate for public office on its ticket.

== Biography ==
=== Early years ===
John M. Work was born January 3, 1869, in rural Washington County in Southeastern Iowa, the son of John H. Work, a farmer.

In September 1886, Work left the family farm in Dutch Creek Township and went off to school. He stayed close to home, attending the non-denominational religious preparatory school Washington Academy, in nearby Washington, Iowa, returning home on weekends to help with the farm work. Work graduated the academy in June 1889, part of a graduating class of 8.

Following graduation from Washington Academy, Work began studying law in the office of an elderly lawyer in Washington who was a friend of the Work family, with John running errands. After a year he returned to the farm to help with the summer work before enrolling in Monmouth College in Monmouth, Illinois, a United Presbyterian school which often sent its graduates on to theological seminaries. Work entered with Senior class status and graduated in June 1891 with a Bachelor of Arts degree.

While in college, Work was a supporter of the Prohibition Party.

Upon graduation, Work took a job at a weekly newspaper published in Monmouth, gathering local news and soliciting advertising. He was a failure as an ad salesman, however, and was fired after just six weeks.

Work decided to attend the United Presbyterian Theological Seminary at Allegheny, Pennsylvania in the fall of 1892. Upon arrival, Work found the seminary "cheerless and uninviting" and spontaneously decided to hop a train for Washington, D.C. to attend Columbian Law School, now part of George Washington University. Work graduated in June 1892 with a degree of Bachelor of Laws.

After passing the Iowa State Bar exam, Work began to practice law in Des Moines, Iowa. He also joined the Young Men's Republican Club in Des Moines and was a delegate to a national convention of Republican clubs in Louisville, Kentucky in 1893. He remained a Republican until 1896 and practiced law until 1900.

Work married a former classmate at Monmouth College, Lucy Josephine Hoisington, on June 24, 1896, in Monmouth, Illinois. The pair had a daughter, Josephine, in April 1897.

In the fall of 1896, Work began studying various social remedies at the Des Moines Public Library, preparing for a public lecture against socialism. During the course of his studies, Work read The Co-operative Commonwealth by Laurence Gronlund. He later recalled:

As I read, my ambition to prepare a lecture against socialism dissolved into nothingness. The book opened my eyes. I owe a great debt to it. * * * I proceeded to read books and otherwise investigate the single tax, the initiative and referendum, bi-metallism, proportional representation, free trade, postal savings banks, public ownership of public service corporations, extension of the civil service ... , election of judges and United States Senators by the people ... , the limitation of the powers of the judiciary, the limitation of the powers of the executives. I also investigated the concentration of wealth and the encroachments of monopoly. * * * By the autumn of 1897 I was a confirmed socialist, although I really was a socialist from the time when I read Laurence Gronlund's The Co-operative Commonwealth in the fall of 1896.

— Glances at My Life, chapter 3, page 6

Work became absorbed with advancing the socialist idea. His law practice suffered as a result.

=== Political career ===
John M. Work was a founding member of the Socialist Party of America in August 1901.

Work was the organizer of the first branch of the formed Social Democratic Party of America of Iowa and attended the Iowa state convention of the newly formed organization in 1899. The gathering was attended by about 50 delegates from 11 of the state's 99 counties. Work was elected secretary of the state organization and given the task of preparing a state platform.

Work's first published article on socialism, entitled "Credential of Socialism," was published in the Des Moines Iowa Unionist in January 1900. That fall he also addressed his first "street meeting" as a soapboxer on behalf of the Social Democratic Party, speaking for half an hour. Work would subsequently tour the nation speaking to public audiences on socialist themes.

In December 1900, Work went to Minnesota to await a forthcoming national convention of the Social Democratic Party, called for January 15, 1901, in Chicago, but fell ill and had to return to Iowa, missing the gathering.

In July 1901, Work was the delegate of the Des Moines branch of the Social Democratic Party to the Unity Convention which established the Socialist Party of America (SPA). Although taken aback by the "lack of brotherliness" displayed by many of the delegates, Work remained active in the new organization. In October 1901, he was elected by referendum vote of the membership as the Socialist Party of Iowa's delegate to the governing National Committee of the SPA.

Beginning at this time, Work also periodically contributed material to the Iowa Socialist, the newspaper of the Iowa party, the Chicago Socialist, and The Coming Nation (later gaining fame as The Appeal to Reason.)

In 1902, Work was the candidate of the Socialist Party for Mayor of Des Moines. He ran the next year for Governor of Iowa for the first time.

When the SPA briefly moved its headquarters to Omaha, Nebraska in 1903, Work by virtue of his status as National Committee member of an adjacent state became a member of the so-called "National Quorum," which acted as a de facto executive committee between annual meetings of the National Committee. Work was joined in this position by Barney Berlyn of Illinois, Stephen M. Reynolds of Indiana, Charles Dobbs of Kentucky, and Victor L. Berger of Wisconsin. The party moved its headquarters again, this time to Chicago, in 1904.

Work was a delegate to the 1904 National Convention of the Socialist Party, held in Chicago. This convention established an elected 7 member National Executive Committee to handle matters of party governance in between annual sessions of the National Committee, a group which was at the same time expanded to enhance representation by large states. Work and the others of the National Quorum were reappointed until the new constitution could be ratified by the membership of the SPA.

In January 1905, Work wrote an introductory work on socialism called What's So and What Isn't. The short book was frequently reprinted and became his best known writing, one of the Socialist Party's propaganda standards of the Debs era. The first 10,000 copies of the work appeared as the March 1905 number of Wayland's Monthly. The book would ultimately be published in over a dozen editions, with a total print run of well over 165,000 copies.

The first edition of Work's best-selling introduction to socialism, What's So and What Isn't, appeared as the March 1905 issue of Wayland's Monthly.

Work introduced five amendments to the SPA's national constitution in 1905, one of which made the National Executive Committee directly elected by the party membership instead of by the National Committee; another which made the party's Executive Secretary electable by the membership instead of by the National Committee, and a third which caused all amendments to the national constitution to be presented to the membership seriatim, so that individual parts of the proposal could be accepted or declined on their own merits. These proposals were overwhelmingly carried by the party membership in December 1905 and became a regular part of party life.

In January 1906, Work was reelected to the SPA's NEC on the first ballot, receiving 32 of the 45 votes cast. This was the last NEC elected by the National Committee, since the passage of Work's constitutional amendment had come too close to the January deadline to take immediate effect. Work was also reelected to the National Committee by the Socialist Party of Iowa in February of that same year.

In 1906, Work revised and shortened What's So and What Isn't so that The Appeal to Reason could issue it as a new 10 cent pamphlet. The book was again revised with the addition of five new chapters for 1,000 copies of a clothbound edition by Charles H. Kerr & Co. that same summer. Although stated as the Third Edition, this actually constituted the Fourth Edition of the work. A slightly corrected hardcover Fifth Edition followed from Kerr the next year.

In January 1907, Work was again returned to the Socialist Party's 7 member NEC, this time by vote of the party membership in referendum. Joining Work on this first membership-elected committee were Morris Hillquit and Ben Hanford of New York, Ernest Untermann of Florida, A.M. Simons and Joseph Medill Patterson of Illinois, and Victor L. Berger of Wisconsin.

Together with Hillquit and Simons, Work was part of a committee of three given the task of preparing the Socialist Party's 1908 platform. Work prepared and circulated a so-called "minority report" written in simple to understand language, while the erudite Hillquit prepared a version more to his liking. In his memoirs, Work later recalled exchanging mean-spirited words with Hillquit over the two drafts, with Hillquit calling Work's version "kindergartenish," while Work retorted that Hillquit's version was "sophomoric." Neither version was ultimately accepted.

Work was an employee of the National Office of the Socialist Party in August and September 1908, during which time he prepared the proceedings of the 1908 National Convention for publication. At the same time he appeared on the ballot as a candidate for U.S. Senate.

Work was defeated in his attempt for re-election to the NEC in the party referendum election of January 1910. In the aftermath, Work was asked by National Executive Secretary J. Mahlon Barnes to take a job in the National Office, handling literature and supplies and working to develop organizations in unorganized states. Work accepted the offer.

Work also attended the 1910 National Congress of the Socialist Party as a delegate, delivering the report on organization on behalf of the NEC. He was also the candidate of the Socialist Party for Governor of Iowa in the fall of that year.

In August 1911, Mahlon Barnes was forced to resign as Executive Secretary, revealed by a NEC investigation to have placed the mother of his illegitimate child on the party payroll. John Work was selected by the NEC to take his place on an interim basis, beginning September 1. A referendum was held to formally fill the position that fall, an election in which Work was elected over J.O. Bentall, 22,081 to 6,449.

As Executive Secretary of the Socialist Party, Work found himself in the spotlight, the recipient of criticism and the object of political machinations. The rurally-raised Christian Socialist, Work often found himself at loggerheads with de facto party leader Morris Hillquit, an eloquent urban Marxist. Hillquit plainly sought Work's removal as Executive Secretary. As chairman of the Constitution Committee at the 1912 National Convention of the Socialist Party Hillquit oversaw an amendment returning the selection of the SPA's Executive Secretary to the National Committee.

For his part Work was unhappy that Hillquit had reintegrated his personal friend and close political associate Mahlon Barnes into the National Office as the 1912 Socialist campaign manager, a newly created post serving at the pleasure of the NEC rather than the Executive Secretary. When Barnes incurred a $12,000 deficit in the running of the campaign, Work bitterly remonstrated that Barnes had used the regular funds of the party without authorization instead of specially earmarked campaign funds.

Not surprisingly, the return of Executive Secretary selection to the inner circle of the National Committee spelled the end of Work's tenure in the position. Work was cast aside by the National Committee at its 1913 meeting in favor of Walter Lanfersiek, with Lanfersiek garnering 37 votes to 9 for Work, with left wingers Frank Bohn and J.E. Snyder trailing with 8 and 5 votes, respectively. This marked the first time in its history that a sitting Executive Secretary of the Socialist Party had failed in his bid for re-election.

After a six-week lecture tour of Illinois on behalf of the state Socialist Party organization in that state, Work left the party's employment to take a job as a teacher of law at LaSalle Extension University in Illinois, a post which he continued for the next four academic years. The school had obtained over 3,000 socialist correspondence students, largely through its advertising in The Appeal to Reason, and actively sought a qualified socialist teacher for their instruction. Work was hired as a correspondence teacher of law.

Work ran two political campaigns in 1914, making a try for Chicago city alderman in the spring and appearing on the ballot as a Socialist for U.S. Congress in the 10th District of Illinois in the fall.

With election of the NEC returned to direct election by the party membership in 1916, Work chose to run again for the body. In a vote closing in May 1916 he joined Victor Berger, Morris Hillquit, Anna A. Maley, and John Spargo on the 5 person NEC. He remained in that position until the Socialist Party split of 1919.

In June 1916, Work was nominated by the state convention of the Socialist Party of Illinois as its candidate for governor.

In the spring of 1917, Work was an alternate delegate to the 1917 Emergency National Convention of the Socialist Party in St. Louis. While he had been opposed to the calling of the special convention, he was supportive of the aggressive anti-war declaration drafted by Hillquit, C.E. Ruthenberg, and Algernon Lee which was passed by the convention and later ratified in referendum vote of the party membership. That fall, Work stood as the Socialist Party's candidate for Superior Judge in Chicago, having retained his citizenship in Illinois despite taking a job as an editorial writer in Milwaukee.

Work was not a delegate to the 1919 Emergency National Convention of the Socialist Party, at which the party split into three rival organizations.

Work was the Socialist Party's candidate in the 1925 special election to fill the seat of Wisconsin U.S. Senator Robert M. La Follette, who had died in office.

Thereafter, Work largely contained his Socialist Party activity to journalism, making an exception to run for delegate to the 1936 National Convention. A known opponent of the 1934 Declaration of Principles, Work was defeated in his bid for full delegate status and was elected instead as an alternate. He chose not to attend but neither did he follow the so-called "Old Guard" out of the party into a new rival organization called the Social Democratic Federation. "I believed that the Socialist Party would get over this spell of 'the measles,' and I stayed in it—and my belief turned out to be correct," he later recalled in his memoirs.

Work did not lay an active role in Socialist Party affairs again until the middle 1940s, when the 75-year-old Work was elected a delegate to the 1946 National Convention of the Socialist Party in Chicago.

=== Journalistic career ===
In May 1917, Victor L. Berger offered John Work, his colleague on the NEC, a position as an editorial writer at The Milwaukee Leader, of which Berger was editor-in-chief. The previous editorial writer, James R. "Jim" Howe, had recently died and Berger was in need of an immediate replacement. Work accepted and on May 17, 1917, took over as the editor of the editorial page, writing the unsigned daily editorials on the left side of the page.

The Leader, as an anti-war publication, drew the ire of the Wilson administration and its Postmaster General, Albert S. Burleson and in October 1917 had its Second Class mailing privileges revoked. In August 1918 the publication was deprived of the right to receive First Class mail, with all letters from subscribers and readers sent to the publication summarily returned to sender with the envelope stamped "Mail to This Address Undeliverable Under Espionage Act." Despite the attack, loyal Milwaukee readers and advertisers rallied around the paper with monetary donations and the publication survived the attack. Through it all, Work wrote extensively on anti-militarist themes including, according to his own testimony, four of the five editorials for which Victor Berger was indicted by a grand jury in Chicago in December 1918.

After the termination of the Milwaukee Leader in 1942, Work wrote a series of texts on legal themes which were published through LaSalle Extension University.

=== Death and legacy ===
John Work died just two days after his 92nd birthday, on January 5, 1961, in Whitefish Bay, Wisconsin.

John Work's papers are housed by the Milwaukee Public Library. The collection is contained 7 manuscript boxes and is available to scholars, who should contact the library in advance in order to work the papers.

The manuscripts of four unpublished autobiographical works by John M. Work are housed at the Wisconsin Historical Society in Madison and are available on microfilm by sale or through interlibrary loan.

== Works ==
=== Books and pamphlets ===
- What's So and What Isn't. Girard, Kansas: The Appeal to Reason, 1905. Also translated into Lithuanian.
- Private Property. Chicago: National Office, Socialist Party, n.d., c. 1911.
- Report of National Secretary to the Socialist Party National Convention, 1912. Chicago: H.G. Adair, 1912.
- Where You Get Off, 1913.
- The Key to the Mystery: Why the Producers of All Wealth Have Northing. Girard, KS: The Appeal to Reason, 1914.
- Why Things Happen to Happen, 1919.
- A Big Undertaking. Chicago: Socialist Party, n.d., c. 1925.
- Certain Misconceptions: A Few Current Objections to Socialism Answered. Girard, KS: Haldeman-Julius Publications, 1931. Also translated into Spanish.
- Executors and Administrators: With Outline of Study, Lesson Talks, and Daily Recitations. Chicago: LaSalle Extension University, 1936.
- Conflict of Laws: With Outline of Study, Lesson Talks, and Daily Recitations. Chicago: LaSalle Extension University, 1944.
- Let's Be Practical. New York: Socialist Party, 1945.
- Landlord and Tenant: With Outline of Study, Lesson Talks, and Daily Recitations. Chicago: LaSalle Extension University, 1949.
- Municipal Corporations: With Outline of Study, Lesson Talks, and Daily Recitations. Chicago: LaSalle Extension University, 1950.
- Letters to a Lady. New York: Exposition Press, 1951.
- X-Rays on Human Affairs. New York: Vantage Press, 1955.
- Face the Future. New York: Vantage Press, 1958.
- Philip and Aurelia: A Novel. New York: Comet Press Books, 1957.
- Lectures on Real Property: With Outline of Study, Lesson Talks, and Daily Recitations. With George Raymond Jekins and William S. Rea. Chicago, Illinois: LaSalle Extension University, 1961.

=== Leaflets and articles ===
- "The Recent Election." Organizational Leaflet No. 2. Chicago: Socialist Party National Office, n.d. 1917.
- "The First World War," The Wisconsin Magazine of History, vol. 41, no. 1 (Autumn 1957), pp. 32–44. In JSTOR
