= Milwaukee Leader =

Front page of the Milwaukee Leader, Jan. 3, 1920, detailing the aftermath of the Palmer Raids.

The Milwaukee Leader was a socialist daily newspaper established in Milwaukee, Wisconsin in December 1911 by Socialist Party leader Victor L. Berger. The Woodrow Wilson administration attempted to suppress the paper during World War I by denying it access to the mails and conducting periodic raids on its offices, but it managed to survive through a combination of direct donations from supporters, economizing measures, and home delivery in Milwaukee by a network of newspaper delivery bodys.

The Leader continued in operation until January 1939, when it was succeeded by the Milwaukee Evening Post.

== History ==
=== Establishment ===
The Milwaukee Leader was established on December 7, 1911, by a holding company called the Social Democratic Publishing Company. Stock was owned jointly by unions, branches of the Socialist Party, and individual participants in the labor and radical movement. Critical additional funding was provided by Elizabeth H. Thomas, a wealthy Milwaukee resident of radical political views.

Editor-in-Chief from the paper's founding was Victor L. Berger, best known as the first Socialist member of the United States Congress. Other important editorialists over the paper's history included James R. "Jim" Howe (who died in the spring of 1917), his successor John M. Work, and international affairs commentator Ernest Untermann.

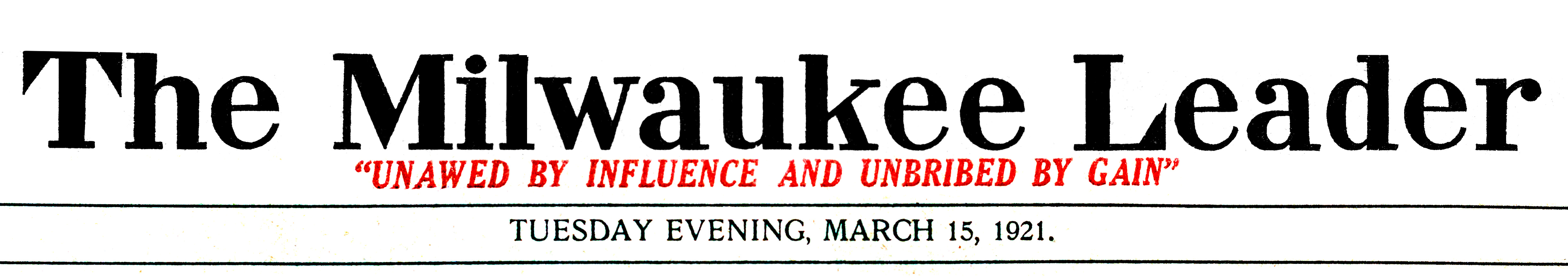
The masthead from The Milwaukee Leader daily newspaper from March 1921.

=== World War I problems ===
During World War I, the paper's consistent antimilitarist stand brought it into conflict with the administration of President Woodrow Wilson and his Postmaster General Albert Burleson. The Leader's second class mailing privileges was revoked on September 22, 1917, forcing an instant doubling of the price of mail subscriptions — eliminating 5 out of 6 mail subscribers in one blow. To meet the financial emergency which followed, a mass meeting was held on October 13, with a crowd of more than 5,000 contribuing $4,000 at the single event.

With circulation forced to contract, advertising revenue dried up. The paper reduced its typical layout from 12 to 6 pages in an effort to economize on production costs.

In August 1918 the publication was deprived of the right to receive first class mail, with all letters from subscribers and readers sent to the publication summarily returned to sender with the envelope stamped "Mail to This Address Undeliverable Under Espionage Act." The paper was one of several periodicals to sue the post office department in court, filing a writ of mandamus in an attempt to force restoration of second class mailing rights. This effort was unsuccessful.

The paper was twice raided by the U.S. Department of Justice and subscriber records were seized.

Editor-in-Chief Victor L. Berger, one of the leading socialist politicians in America, was subjected to particular scruting, facing federal indictment in February 1918 under the Espionage Act. Facing trial along four other top leaders of the Socialist Party, Berger was convicted and sentenced to a 20 year term in prison for conspiracy to undermine the war effort. Bail was collected to keep Berger free pending appeal and the conviction was subsequently overturned on appeal.

The Leader managed to survive only through carrier delivery in Milwaukee and its environs, with the paper regaining its mailing privileges only in June 1921, over two and a half years after the armistice which ended the world war. The paper survived this onslaught without skipping an issue and by 1923 had nearly 50,000 subscribers on its rolls.

=== Sale and name changes ===
Suffering financially, the Leader was sold on in March 1938 to Paul Holmes. Although no immediate changes were taken in the paper's editorial stance, editorialist John Work later recalled "for a little while I could write socialist editorials, but it soon appeared that, while I could write socialist editorials, I was expected not to make much use of the word 'socialism.' I stayed on, knowing that I could still do some good work for the cause, and not knowing but that the socialists might again get control of the paper."

The new owners formed a new holding company for the paper called the Wisconsin Guardian Publishing Company. In April 1938 the name of the paper was changed from the Milwaukee Leader to the New Milwaukee Leader.

In January 1939, seeking to further distance the faltering publication from its socialist past and to bring in as many new readers as possible of a recently terminated Hearst newspaper, the name of the New Milwaukee Leader was changed again, this time to the Milwaukee Evening Post.

In the spring of 1939, new owner Paul Holmes and his associates sold their interest in the Wisconsin Guardian Publishing Company to representatives of the Milwaukee Federated Trades Council, and the unions took over the paper. The paper continued to languish.

By July 1940, the Milwaukee unions had enough of the faltering daily and made an arrangement for the paper's employees to run it. The name of the paper was changed yet again that September, this time to the Milwaukee Post which continued in daily print until May 23, 1942, six months after the US entered WWII.

The complete run of the Milwaukee Leader is available on microfilm from the Wisconsin Historical Society.

== See also ==
- Social-Democratic Party of Wisconsin
- New York Call
