= Meta Berger =

American socialist organizer

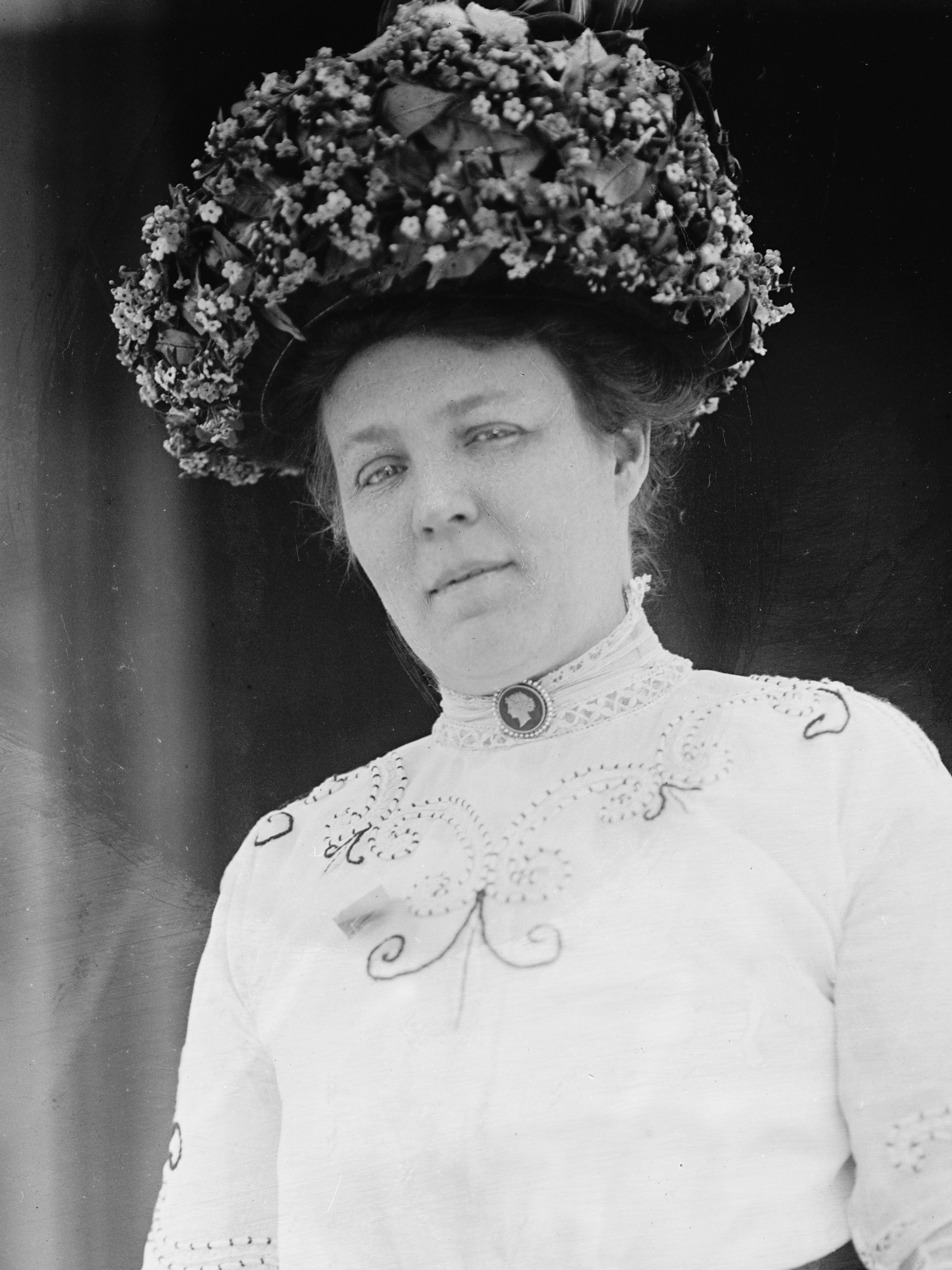
- Berger in 1911

Member of the Milwaukee Board of School Directors
- In office April 1909 – April 1939
- Succeeded by: William H. Tesch

Personal details
- Born: Meta Schlichting; February 23, 1873 Milwaukee, Wisconsin, U.S.
- Died: June 16, 1944 (aged 71) Thiensville, Wisconsin, U.S.
- Resting place: Forest Home Cemetery
- Party: Socialist Labor (before 1897); Social Democracy (1897–1898); Social Democratic (1898–1901); Socialist (1901–1940)
- Other political affiliations: Social-Democratic Party of Wisconsin (1897–1940)
- Spouse: Victor L. Berger (m. 1897; died 1929)
- Occupation: Political activist

Meta Berger (née Schlichting; February 23, 1873 – June 16, 1944) was an American socialist organizer in Milwaukee, Wisconsin, and advocate for improved public schooling systems. She was also the wife of the prominent Socialist Party of America politician Victor L. Berger.

== Biography ==
=== Early years ===
Meta Schlichting was born in Milwaukee, Wisconsin to parents from Germany on February 23, 1873. She was educated at the Wisconsin State Normal School (now the University of Wisconsin–Milwaukee). She taught primary school for three years before resigning in 1897 to marry Victor Berger.

=== Political career ===
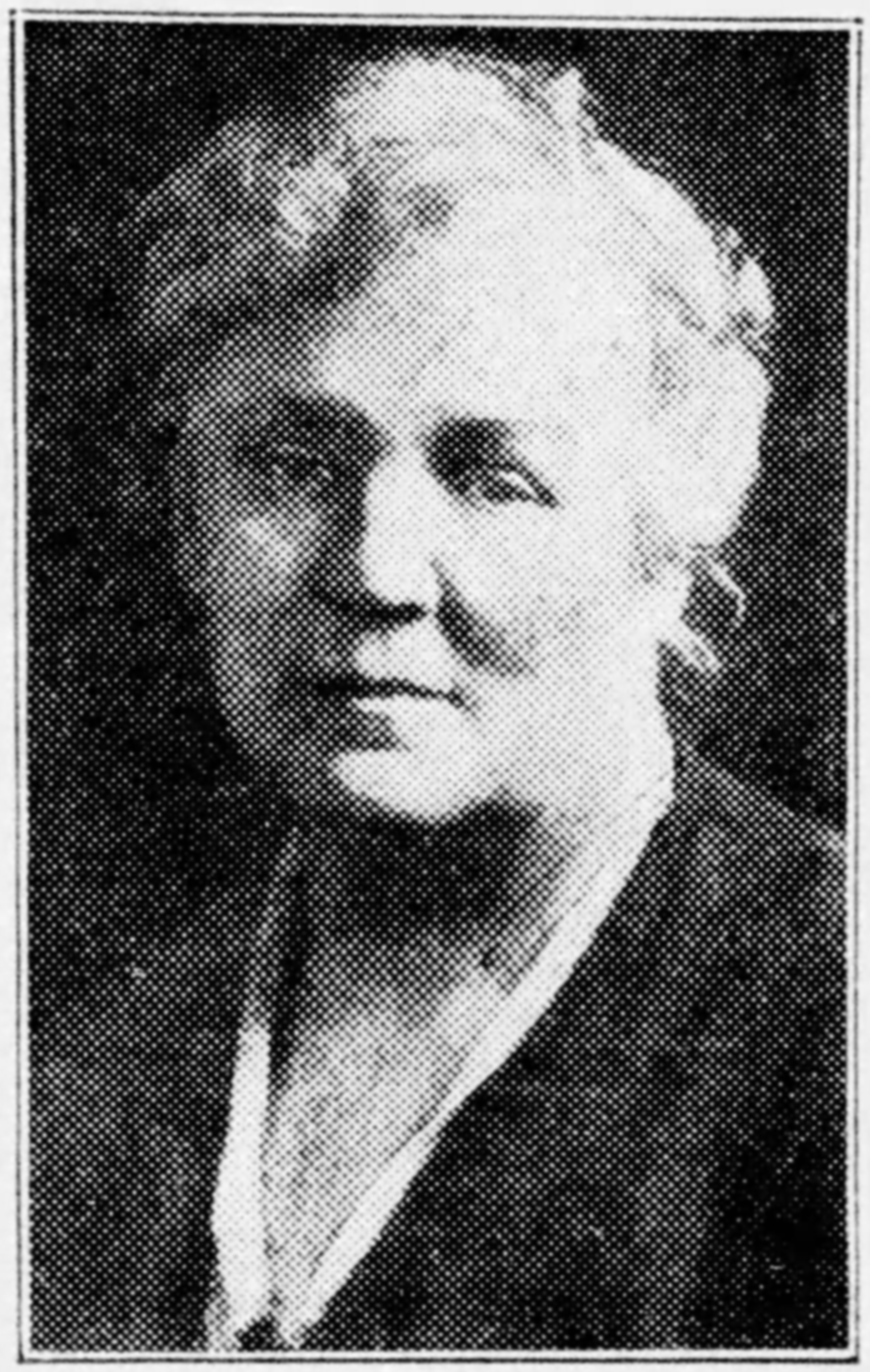
Berger c. 1938

In 1909, Berger was elected to the Milwaukee school board. As a school board member, she supported progressive measures such as the construction of playgrounds, "penny lunches" and medical exams for children. She also advocated on behalf of teachers, working for tenure, a fixed-salary schedule and a pension system. Re-elected in 1915, Berger won three more times, serving a total of 30 years.

In 1917, Berger joined the Milwaukee Emergency Peace Committee, a group that tried to prevent U.S. Navy recruiters from targeting schoolchildren.

Her work for the school board led to her appointments to the Wisconsin State Board of Education, the Wisconsin Board of Regents of Normal Schools, and University of Wisconsin Board of Regents.

The Bergers spent much of the 1920s traveling in Asia and Germany. After her husband's death in 1929, Berger remained on the school board until 1939, and was considered a potential candidate for vice-president in the Socialist Party in 1932. However, Berger left the Socialist Party in May 1940 in response to pressure from the national office over her continued involvement in communist front organizations.

=== Death and legacy ===
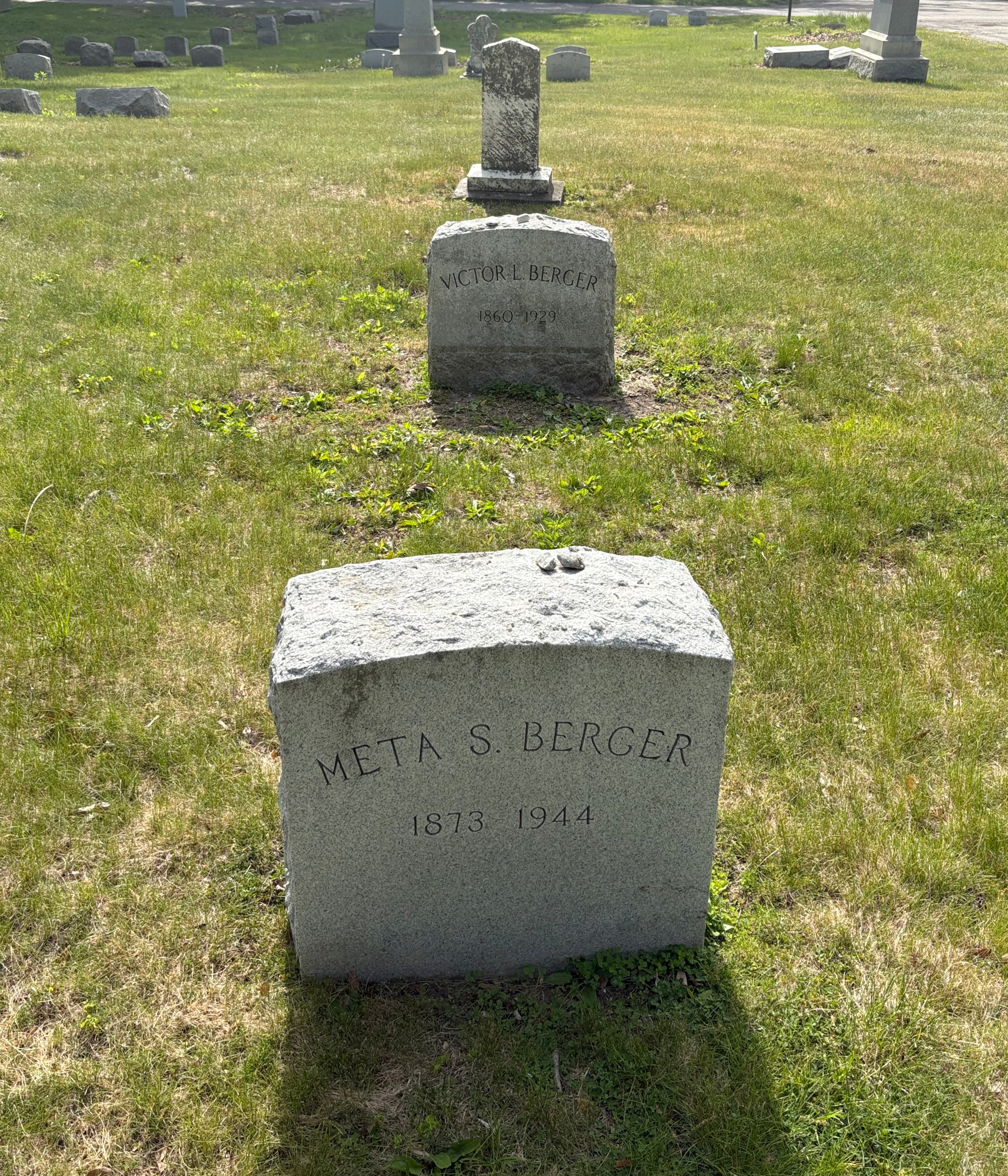
Graves of Meta and Victor Berger at Forest Home Cemetery

Berger died at her Thiensville farm on June 16, 1944, aged 71. She is interred in Forest Home Cemetery in Milwaukee.
