= Victor L. Berger =

American politician (1860–1929)

Victor Berger
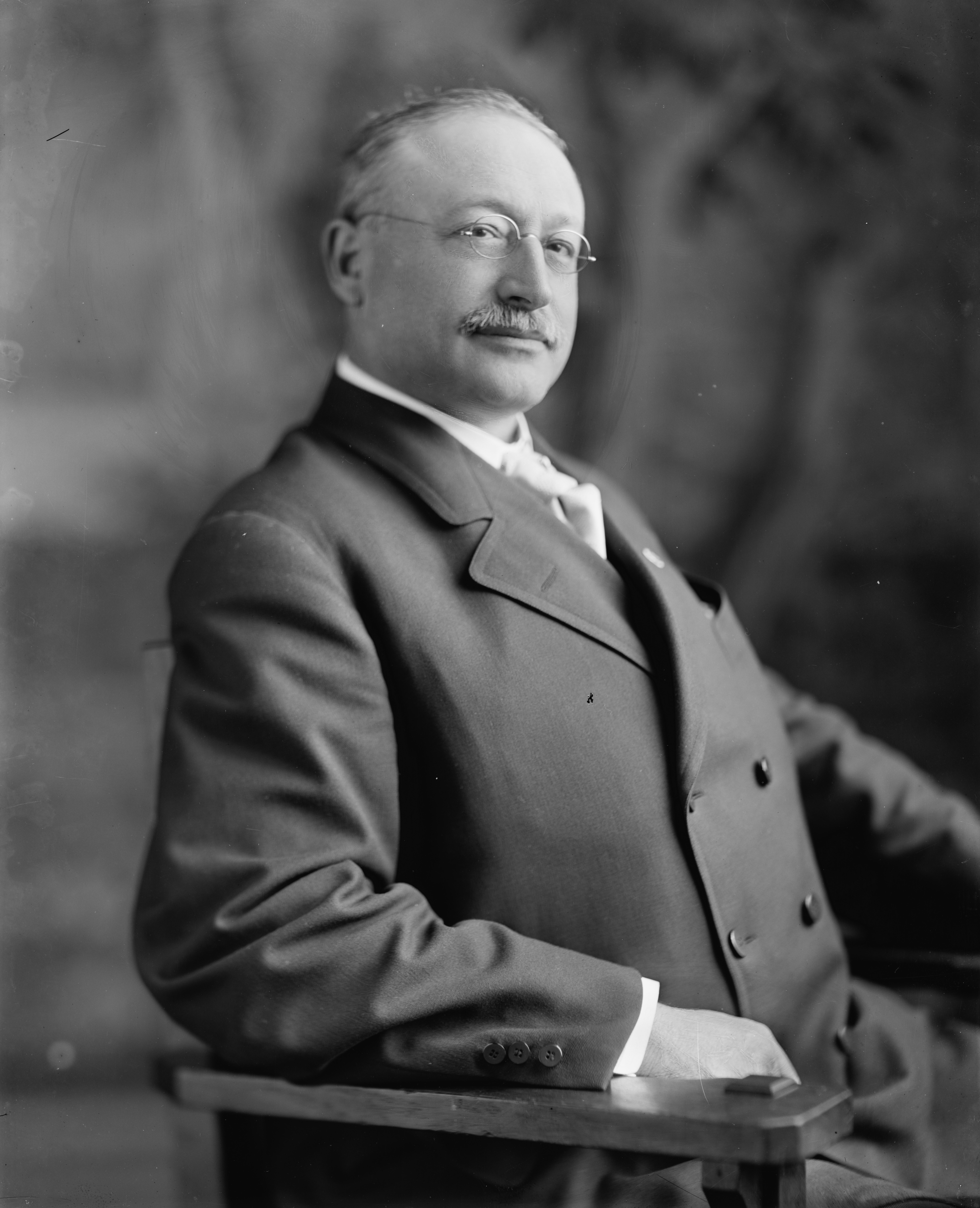
- Portrait by Harris & Ewing c. 1911–1918

Member of the U.S. House of Representatives from Wisconsin's 5th district
- In office March 4, 1923 – March 3, 1929
- Preceded by: William H. Stafford
- Succeeded by: William H. Stafford
- In office March 4, 1919 – November 10, 1919; Unseated
- Preceded by: William H. Stafford
- Succeeded by: William H. Stafford (1921)
- In office March 4, 1911 – March 3, 1913
- Preceded by: William H. Stafford
- Succeeded by: William H. Stafford

National Chairman of the Socialist Party of America
- In office October 20, 1926 – August 7, 1929
- Preceded by: Eugene V. Debs
- Succeeded by: Morris Hillquit

Personal details
- Born: Victor Luitpold Berger; February 28, 1860 Nieder-Rehbach, Austrian Empire (now Romania) (Note: A 1929 Vorwärts article said the place was in Transylvania. The modern name for Niederrehbach is unclear.)
- Died: August 7, 1929 (aged 69) Milwaukee, Wisconsin, U.S.
- Resting place: Forest Home Cemetery
- Party: Socialist Labor (1881–1897); Social Democracy (1897–1898); Social Democratic (1898–1901); Socialist (1901–1929)
- Other political affiliations: Populist (1896); Social-Democratic Party of Wisconsin (1897–1929)
- Spouse: Meta Schlichting (m. 1897)

Victor Luitpold Berger (February 28, 1860 – August 7, 1929) was an Austrian-American socialist politician and journalist who was a founding member of the Social Democratic Party of America and its successor, the Socialist Party of America.

Born in the Austrian Empire (present-day Romania), Berger immigrated to the United States as a young man and became an important and influential socialist journalist in Wisconsin. He helped establish the so-called Sewer Socialist movement, and also sparked the American Socialist Party's nativist turn. In 1910, he was elected as the first Socialist to the U.S. House of Representatives, representing a district in Milwaukee, Wisconsin.

In 1919, Berger was convicted of violating the Espionage Act of 1917 for publicizing his anti-interventionist views and was denied the seat to which he had been reelected in the House of Representatives. The criminal verdict was eventually overturned by the Supreme Court in 1921 in Berger v. United States. Berger was subsequently elected to three successive terms in the 1920s, for which he was seated.

== Early life ==
Berger was born into a Jewish family on February 28, 1860, in Nieder-Rehbach, Austrian Empire (modern Romania). He was the son of Julia and Ignatz Berger. He attended the Gymnasium at Leutschau (today in Slovakia), and the major universities of Budapest and Vienna. In 1878, he immigrated to the United States with his parents, settling near Bridgeport, Connecticut.

Berger's wife, Meta, later claimed that Berger had left Austria-Hungary to avoid conscription into the military.

In 1881, Berger settled in Milwaukee, Wisconsin, home to a large population of German Americans and a very active labor movement. Berger joined the Socialist Labor Party (then headed by Daniel de Leon). In 1892, Berger became the editor of Milwaukee Arbeiter-Zeitung, and changed its name to Vorwärts! He also served as editor of another paper: Die Wahrheit [The Truth]. Berger taught German in the public school system. His future father-in-law was the school commissioner.

Berger was a member of the Milwaukee Turners and was elected leader of the South Side Turners in 1889.

In 1897, he married a former student, Meta Schlichting, an active socialist organizer in Milwaukee. For many years, she was a member of the University of Wisconsin Board of Regents. The couple raised two daughters, Doris (who later went on to write television shows such as General Hospital, with her husband Frank) and Elsa, speaking only German in the home. The parents were strongly oriented to European culture.

== Socialist organizing ==
Berger was credited by trade union leader Eugene V. Debs for having won him over to the cause of socialism. Jailed for six months for violating a federal anti-strike injunction in the 1894 strike of the American Railway Union, Debs turned to reading:

Books and pamphlets and letters from socialists came by every mail and I began to read and think and dissect the anatomy of the system in which workingmen, however organized, could be shattered and battered and splintered on a single stroke [...] It was at this time, when the first glimmerings of socialism were beginning to penetrate, that Victor L. Berger — and I have loved him ever since — came to Woodstock [prison], as if a providential instrument, and delivered the first impassioned message of socialism I had ever heard — the very first to set the wires humming in my system. As a souvenir of that visit there is in my library a volume of Capital by Karl Marx, inscribed with the compliments of Victor L. Berger, which I cherish as a token of priceless value.

In 1896, Berger was a delegate to the People's Party Convention in St. Louis.

Berger was short and stocky, with a studious demeanor, and had both a self-deprecating sense of humor and a volatile temper. Although loyal to friends, he was strongly opinionated and intolerant of dissenting views. His ideological sparring partner and comrade Morris Hillquit later recalled of Berger that

He was sublimely egotistical, but somehow his egotism did not smack of conceit and was not offensive. It was the expression of deep and naive faith in himself, and this unshakable faith was one of the mainsprings of his power over men.

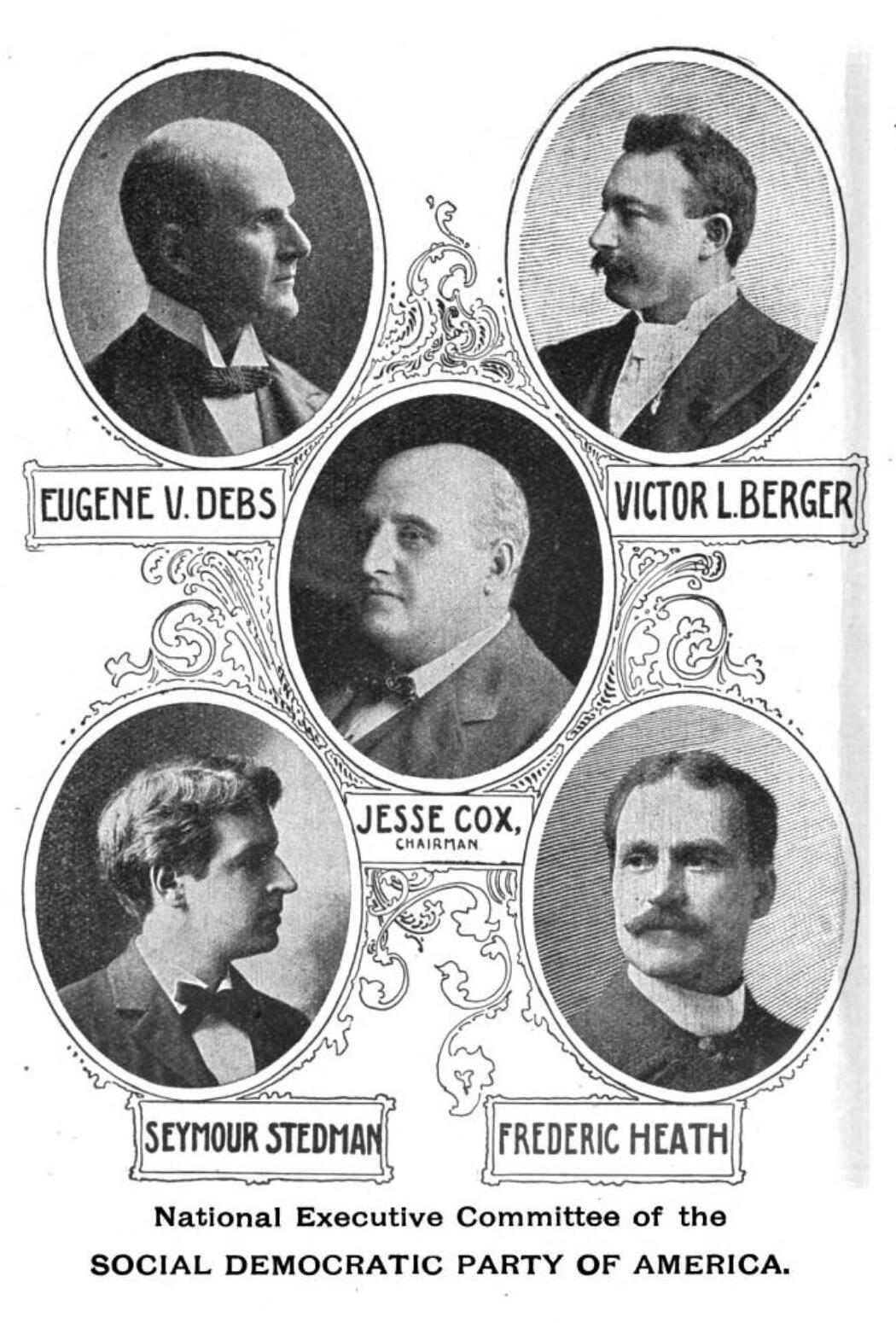
Members of the National Executive Committee of the SDP, 1900

Berger was a founding member of the Social Democracy of America in 1897 and led the split of the "political action" faction of that organization to form the Social Democratic Party of America (SDP) in 1898. He was a member of the governing National Executive Committee of the SDP for its entire duration.

Berger was a founder of the Socialist Party of America in 1901 and played a critical role in the negotiations with an east coast dissident faction of the Socialist Labor Party in the establishment of this new political party. Berger was regarded as one of the party's leading revisionist Marxists, an advocate of the trade union-oriented and incremental politics of Eduard Bernstein. He advocated the use of electoral politics to implement reforms and thus gradually build a collectivist society.

Relative to other contemporary socialist politicians, Berger was a racial conservative. He regularly fought Eugene V. Debs on the subject. Berger initially believed Asian immigrants would out-reproduce white Americans and further complicate the socialist movement's cross-racial solidarity. Between 1907 and 1912, he masterminded racially-discriminatory immigration restrictions in the Socialist Party platform. However, by 1924, he opposed bans on immigration from Asia. His views on Jim Crow were only slightly more nuanced: while Berger wrote in a 1902 editorial that "There can be no doubt that the negroes and mulattoes constitute a lower race — that the Caucasian and even the Mongolian have the start on them in civilization by many years," he does not appear to have believed that this justified "the barbarous behavior of American whites towards the negroes". Instead, Berger argued that segregation was a symptom of an elite capture that left the American legal system indifferent to the poor of every race. By the 1920s, Berger had reversed his views on race, stating that a man "cannot belong to a society organized to persecute Catholics, Jews, Negroes and foreigners — and at the same time call himself a Socialist."

Berger was a man of the written word and back room negotiation, not a notable public speaker. He retained a heavy Austrian accent and had a voice which did not project well. As a rule he did not accept outdoor speaking engagements and was a poor campaigner, preferring one-on-one relationships to mass oratory. Berger was, however, a newspaper editorialist par excellence. Throughout his life he published and edited a number of different papers, including the German language Vorwärts! ("Forward") (1892-1911), the Social-Democratic Herald (1901-1913), and the Milwaukee Leader (1911-1929).

== First term in Congress ==
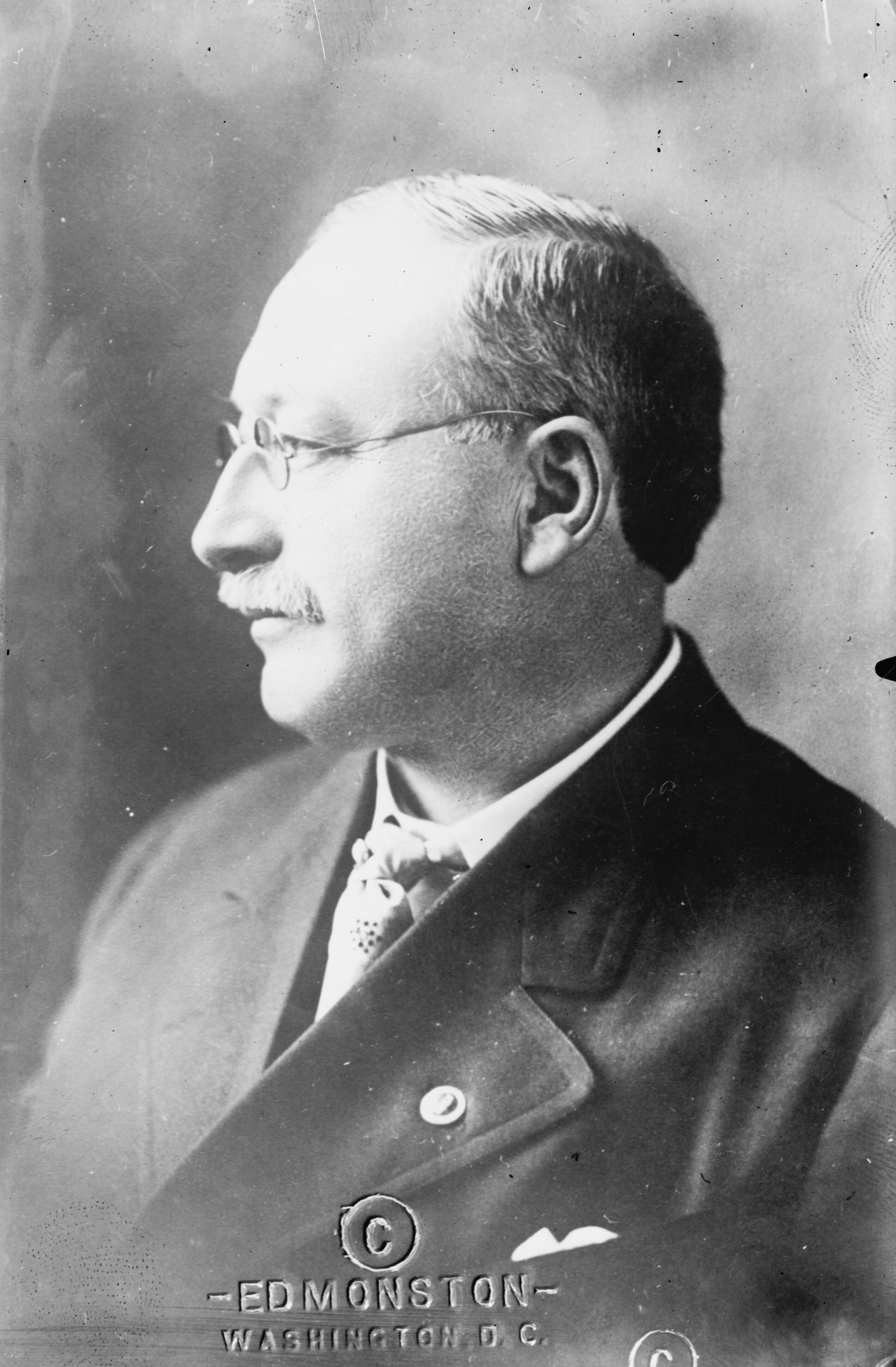
Portrait by Edmonston c. 1910s

Berger first ran for public office in April 1904 when he campaigned for mayor of Milwaukee, coming in third place with 23% of the vote. That November, he ran for Congress in Wisconsin's 5th congressional district and lost again, but came in second place with 28% of the vote. He finally won in 1910, becoming the first Socialist to serve in the United States Congress.

In Congress, he focused on issues related to the District of Columbia and also more radical proposals, including eliminating the President's veto, abolishing the Senate, and the social takeover of major industries. Berger gained national publicity for his old-age pension bill, the first of its kind introduced into Congress. He announced in November 1911 that he intended to introduce a bill for women's suffrage and back it with a petition bearing one million signatures. Less than two weeks after the Titanic passenger ship disaster, Berger introduced a bill in Congress providing for the nationalization of the radio-wireless systems. A practical socialist, Berger argued that the wireless chaos which was one of the features of the Titanic disaster had demonstrated the need for a government-owned wireless system.

Although he did not win re-election in 1912, 1914 or 1916, he remained active in Wisconsin and Socialist Party politics. Berger was especially involved in the biggest party controversy of the pre-war years, the fight between the SP's centrist "regular" bloc against the syndicalist left wing over the issue of "sabotage". The bitter battle erupted in full force at the 1912 National Convention of the Socialist Party, to which Berger was again a delegate. At issue was language to be inserted into the party constitution which called for the expulsion of "any member of the party who opposes political action or advocates crime, sabotage, or other methods of violence as a weapon of the working class to aid in its emancipation." The debate was vitriolic, with Berger, somewhat unsurprisingly, stating the matter in its most bellicose form:

Comrades, the trouble with our party is that we have men in our councils who claim to be in favor of political action when they are not. We have a number of men who use our political organization — our Socialist Party — as a cloak for what they call direct action, for IWW-ism, sabotage and syndicalism. It is anarchism by a new name. ...

Comrades, I have gone through a number of splits in this party. It was not always a fight against anarchism in the past. In the past we often had to fight utopianism and fanaticism. Now it is anarchism again that is eating away at the vitals of our party.

If there is to be a parting of the ways, if there is to be a split — and it seems that you will have it, and must have it — then, I am ready to split right here. I am ready to go back to Milwaukee and appeal to the Socialists all over the country to cut this cancer out of our organization.

The regulars won the day handily at the Indianapolis convention of 1912, with a successful recall of IWW leader "Big Bill" Haywood from the SP's National Executive Committee and an exodus of disaffected left wingers following shortly thereafter. The remaining radicals in the party remembered bitterly Berger's role in this affair and the ill feelings continued to fester until erupting anew at the end of the decade.

== World War I ==
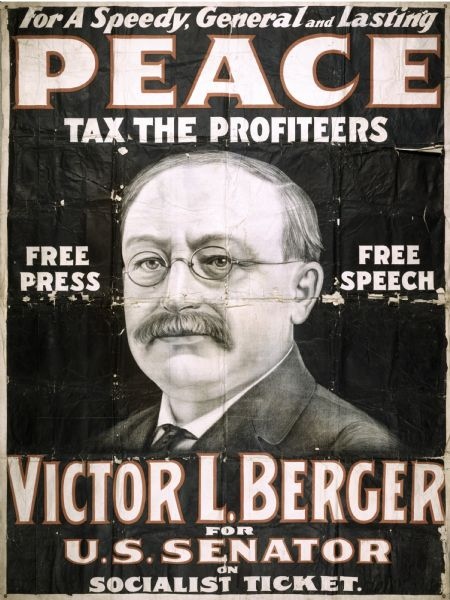
Poster from Berger's 1918 campaign for U.S. Senate

Although Berger's views on World War I were complicated by the Socialist view and the difficulties surrounding his Austrian heritage, he supported his party's stance against the war. When the United States entered the war and passed the Espionage Act of 1917, Berger's continued opposition made him a target. He and four other Socialists were indicted under the Espionage Act in February 1918. The trial followed on December 9 of that year, and on February 20, 1919, Berger was convicted and sentenced to 20 years in federal prison.

During the 1918 United States Senate special election in Wisconsin, Berger ran for the seat despite being under federal indictment. His newspaper, the Milwaukee Leader, had printed a number of anti-war articles, leading the postal service to revoke the paper's second-class mail privileges. Despite these circumstances, Berger won 26% of the vote statewide in an April special election to fill a Senate vacancy, including winning 11 counties, in a three-way race.

The espionage trial was presided over by Judge Kenesaw Mountain Landis. Berger's conviction was appealed and was ultimately overturned by the US Supreme Court on January 31, 1921, which found that Landis had improperly presided over the case after the filing of an affidavit of prejudice.

Even though Berger was under indictment, the voters of Milwaukee once again elected him to the House of Representatives in 1918. When he arrived in Washington to claim his seat, Congress formed a special committee to determine whether a convicted felon and war opponent should be seated as a member of Congress. On November 10, 1919, they concluded that he should not, and they declared the seat vacant, disqualifying him pursuant to Section 3 of the Fourteenth Amendment to the United States Constitution.

Wisconsin promptly held a special election to fill the vacant seat. On December 19, 1919, they elected Berger a second time, and on January 10, 1920, the House again refused to seat him. The seat remained vacant until January 1921, after his previous electoral opponent, Republican William H. Stafford, once again prevailed over Berger in the 1920 general election.

== Second stint in Congress ==
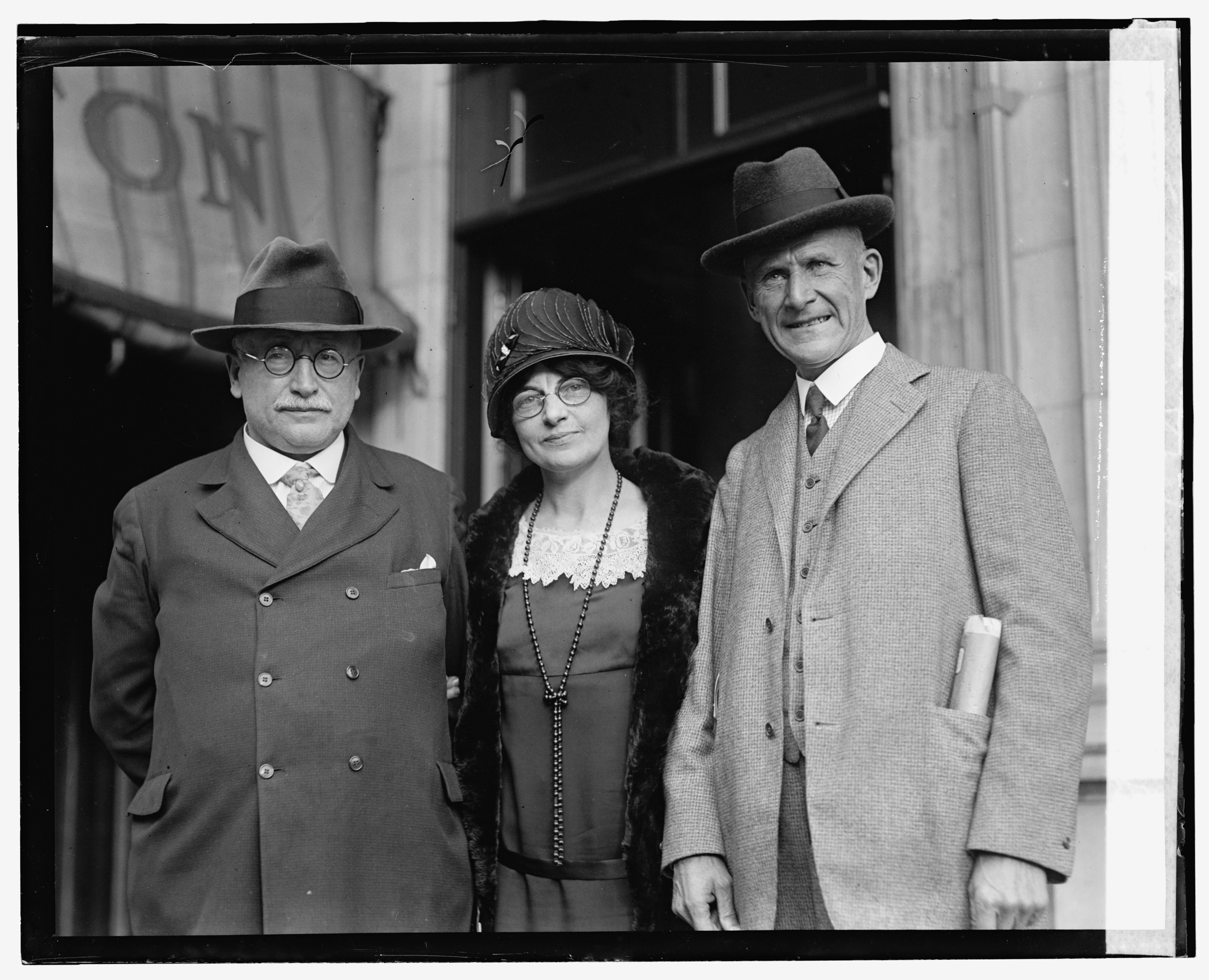
Representative Berger, Bertha Hale White and Eugene V. Debs, 1924

Berger defeated Stafford in 1922 and was reelected in 1924 and 1926. In those terms, he dealt with Constitutional changes, a proposed old-age pension, unemployment insurance, and public housing. He also supported the diplomatic recognition of the Soviet Union and the revision of the Treaty of Versailles. In January 1929, Berger introduced a bill to elect the US House of Representatives by proportional representation. The bill did not pass. After his defeat by Stafford in 1928, he returned to Milwaukee and resumed his career as a newspaper editor. He became national chairman of the Socialist Party upon the death of Eugene V. Debs in 1926, holding the office until his own death in 1929.

== Death ==
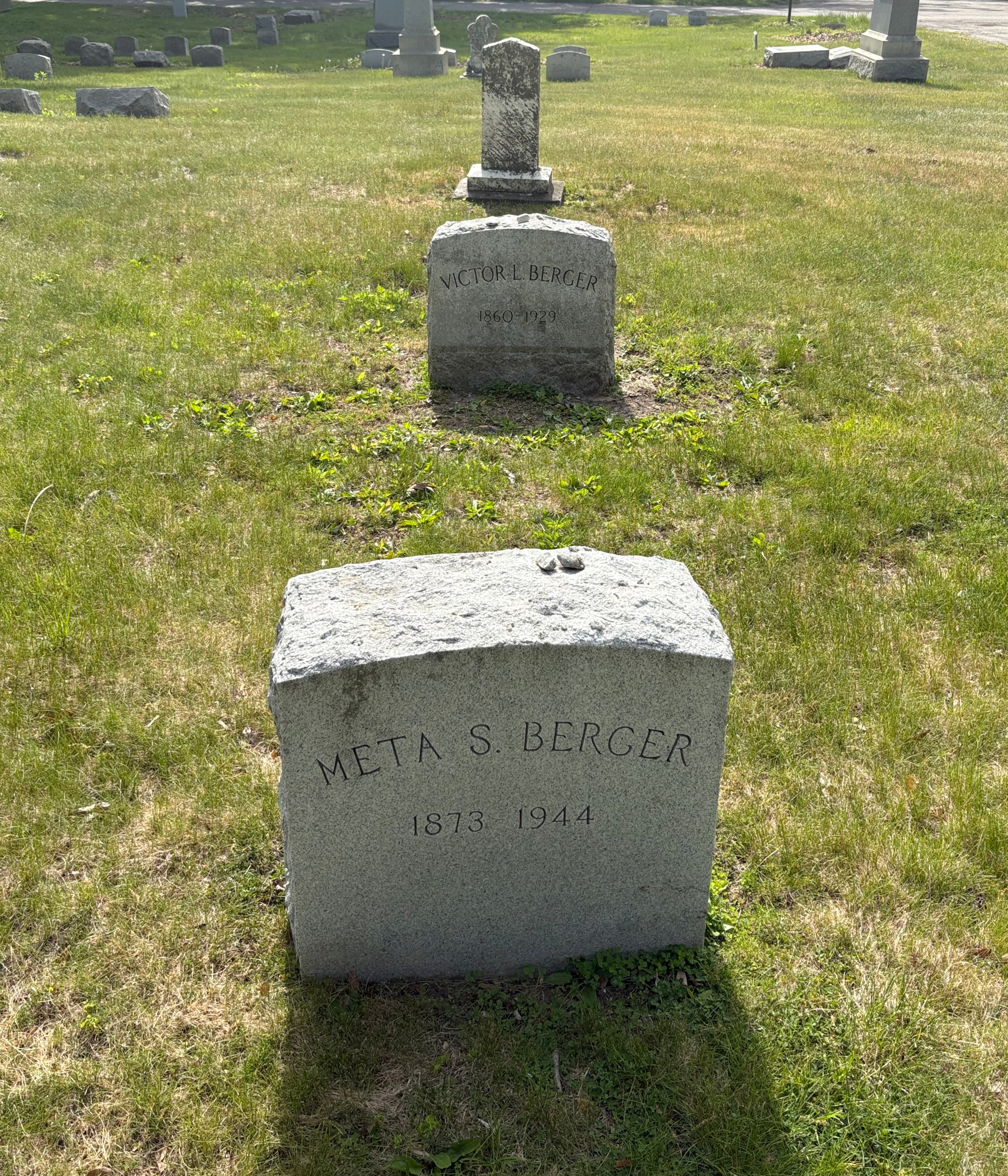
Graves of Meta and Victor Berger at Forest Home Cemetery

On July 16, 1929, while crossing the street outside his newspaper office, Berger was struck by a streetcar travelling on North Third Street (now Dr. Martin Luther King Drive) at the intersection with West Clarke Street in Milwaukee. The accident fractured his skull, and he died of his injuries on August 7, 1929. Prior to burial at Forest Home Cemetery his body lay in state at City Hall. 75,000 residents of the city came to pay their respect.

== Legacy ==
According to historian Sally Miller:

Berger built the most successful socialist machine ever to dominate an American city....[He] concentrated on national politics...to become one of the most powerful voices in the reformist wing of the national Socialist party. His commitment to democratic values and the non-violent socialization of the American system led the party away from revolutionary Marxist dogma. He shaped the party into force which, while struggling against its own left wing, symbolize participation in the political order to attain social reforms.... In the party schism of 1919, Berger opposed allegiance to the emergent Soviet system. His shrunken party echoed his preference for peaceful, democratic, and gradual transformation to socialism.

Berger's papers are housed at the Wisconsin Historical Society, with smaller numbers of items dispersed to other locations. The complete run of the Milwaukee Leader exists on microfilm published by the Wisconsin Historical Society and on site at the University of Wisconsin in Madison.

== Works ==
Victor Berger's writing was voluminous, but rarely reproduced in book or pamphlet form outside of the newspapers in which it first appeared. In 1912, the Social-Democratic Publishing Company published a collection of his works entitled Berger's Broadsides. In 1929, the Milwaukee Leader published the Voice and Pen of Victor L. Berger: Congressional Speeches and Editorials (1860–1929) which also included an obituary. Broadsides included Berger's phrase regarding draining the swamp in reference to his assertion that economic crises such as the Panic of 1893, were "hastened" by excessive profits—the $900,000,000 to Standard Oil "magnates". According to Daniel Yergin in his Pulitzer Prize-winning The Prize: The Epic Quest for Oil, Money, and Power (1990), at the time the general public considered the Standard Oil conglomerate, which was controlled by a small group of directors, to be "all-pervasive" and "completely unaccountable".

[Y]et as long as capitalism lasts, speculation is absolutely necessary and unavoidable in order to protect the system from stagnation." So this is another evil that is inherent in this system. It cannot be avoided any more than malaria in a swampy country. And the speculators are the mosquitos. We should have to drain the swamp-change the capitalist system-if we want to get rid of those mosquitos. Teddy Roosevelt, by starting a little fire here and there to drive them out, is simply disturbing them. He is causing them to swarm, which makes it so much more intolerable for us poor, innocent inhabitants of this big capitalist swamp.

— Victor L. Berger. Berger's Broadsides (1860–1912)

== See also ==
- Meyer London
- Espionage Act of 1917
- First Red Scare
- List of Jewish members of the United States Congress
- Palmer Raids
- Sewer Socialism
- Socialist Party of America
- Social-Democratic Party of Wisconsin
- Unseated members of the United States Congress

== Citations ==
U.S. House of Representatives
Preceded by William H. Stafford	Member of the U.S. House of Representatives from Wisconsin's 5th congressional district 1911–1913	Succeeded by William H. Stafford
Preceded by William H. Stafford	Member of the U.S. House of Representatives from Wisconsin's 5th congressional district Unseated; 1919	Succeeded by William H. Stafford
Preceded by William H. Stafford	Member of the U.S. House of Representatives from Wisconsin's 5th congressional district 1923–1929	Succeeded by William H. Stafford
