= 1908 Milwaukee mayoral election =

← 1906	April 8, 1908	1910 →
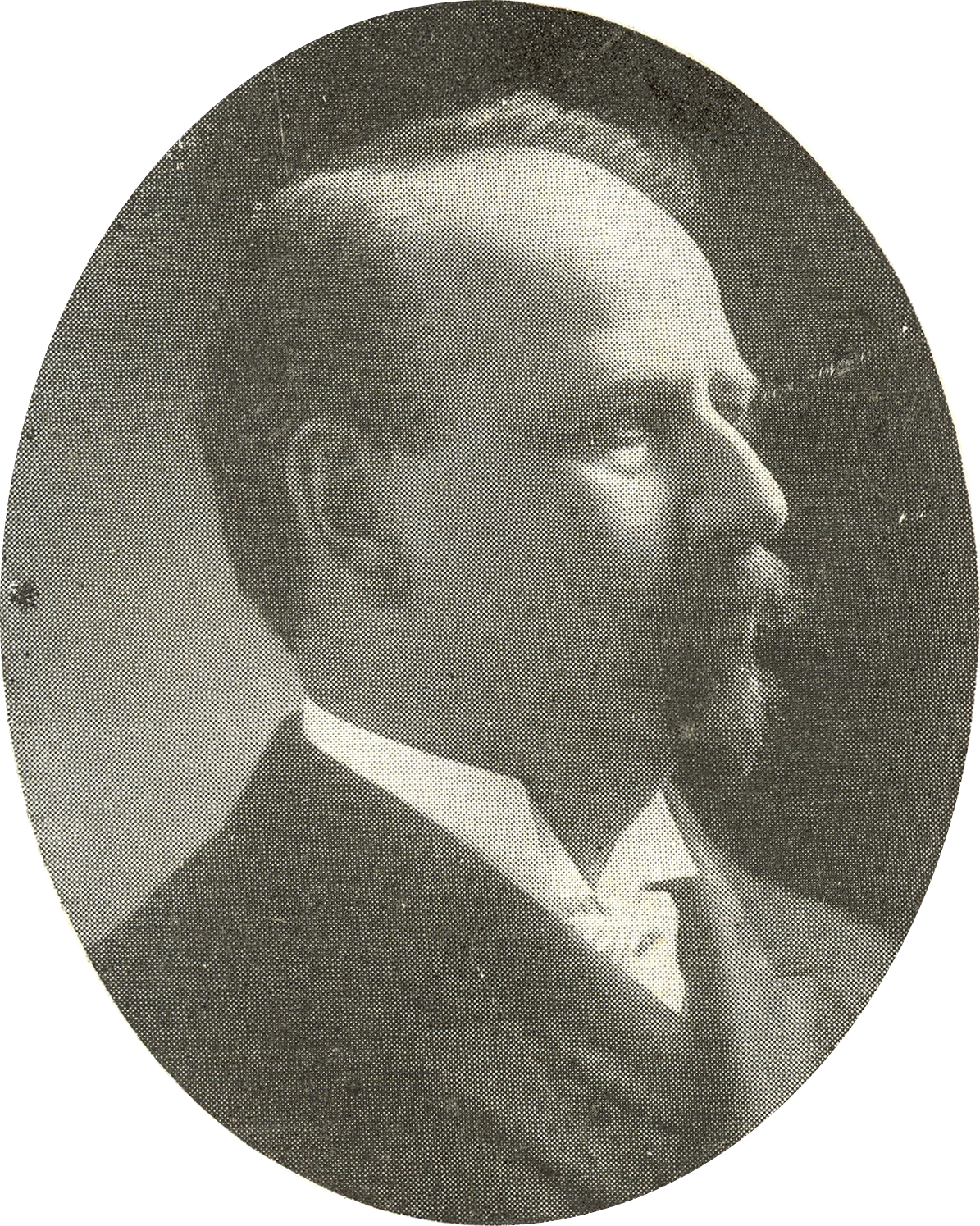

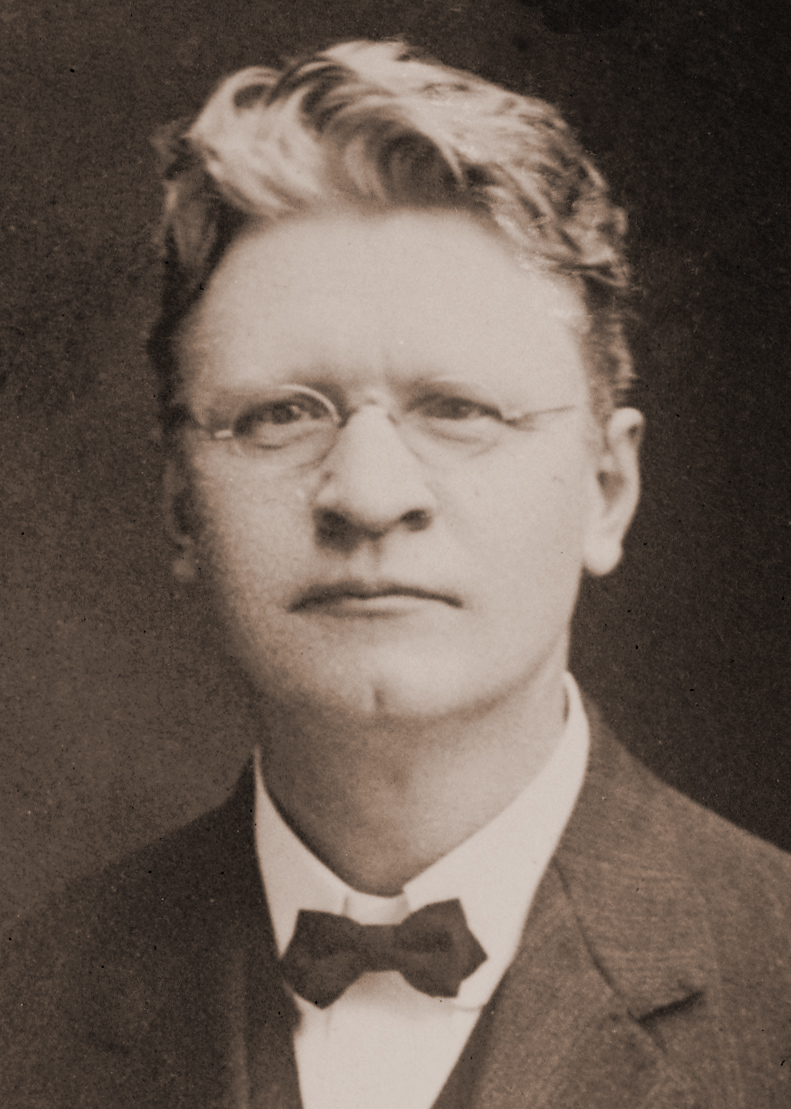

Nominee	David S. Rose	Emil Seidel	T. J. Pringle
Party	Democratic	Social-Democratic	Republican
Popular vote	23,124	20,902	18,446
Percentage	37.01%	33.46%	29.53%
Mayor before election
Sherburn M. Becker
Republican
Elected mayor
David S. Rose
Democratic

An election for Mayor of Milwaukee was held on April 8, 1908. David S. Rose was elected with 37% of the vote.

Candidates included former Milwaukee mayor David S. Rose, Milwaukee city alderman Emil Seidel, and Republican T. J. Pringle.

== Results ==
Milwaukee mayoral election, 1908
Party	Candidate	Votes	%
Democratic	David S. Rose	23,124	37.01
Social-Democratic	Emil Seidel	20,902	33.46
Republican	T. J. Pringle	18,446	29.53
Total votes		62,472	100.00
