= Gerhard Adolph Bading =

American politician

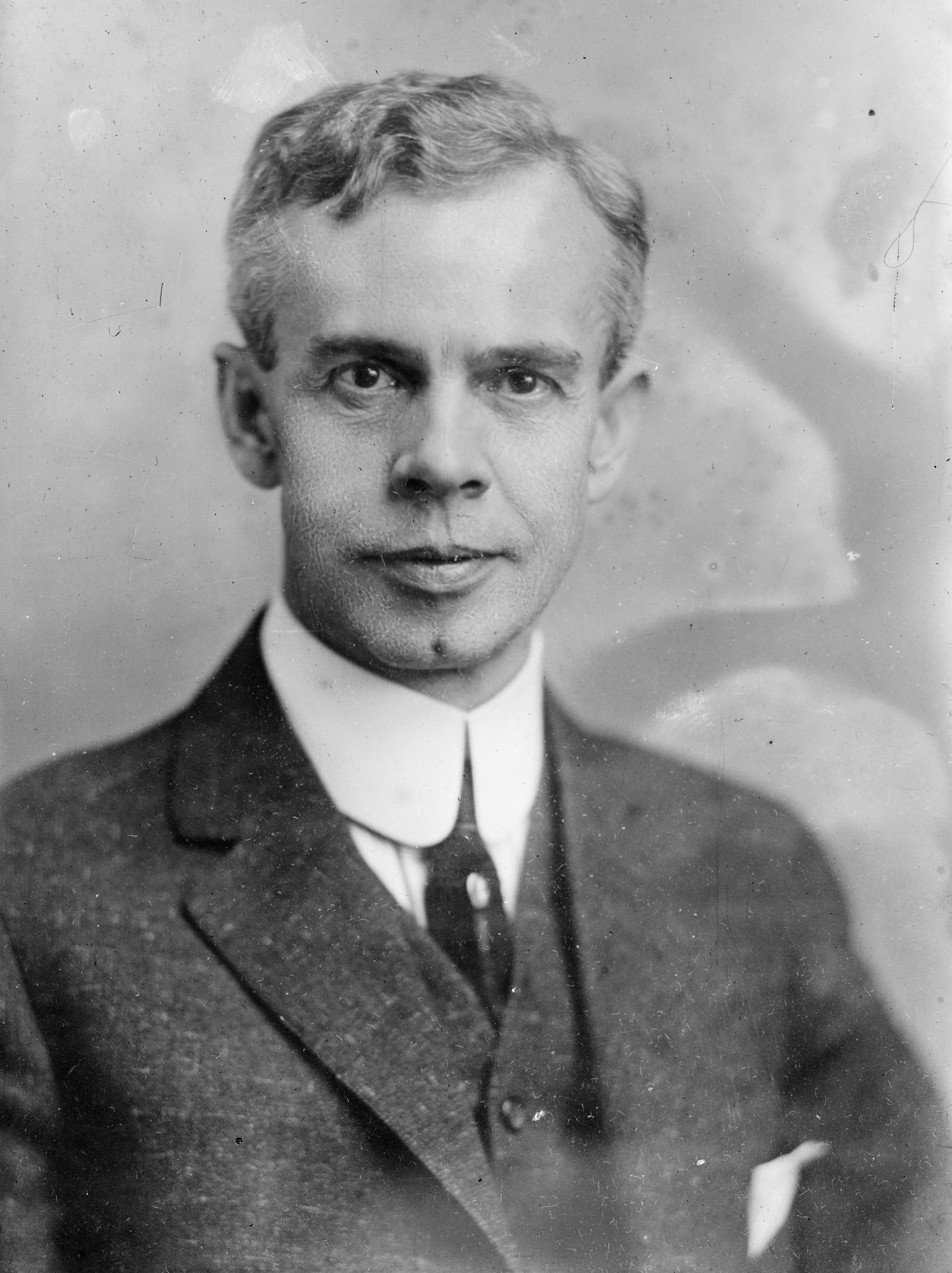
- Bading c. 1916

37th Mayor of Milwaukee, Wisconsin
- In office April 17, 1912 – April 18, 1916
- Preceded by: Emil Seidel
- Succeeded by: Daniel Hoan

United States Envoy to Ecuador
- In office 15 May 1922 – 1 November 1929
- Preceded by: Charles S. Hartman
- Succeeded by: William Dawson

Personal details
- Born: August 31, 1870 Milwaukee, Wisconsin, U.S.
- Died: April 11, 1946 (aged 75)
- Resting place: Forest Home Cemetery, Milwaukee, Wisconsin, U.S.

Gerhard Adolph Bading (August 31, 1870 – April 11, 1946) was an American physician, politician, and diplomat. Bading is best remembered as the 31st mayor of Milwaukee, Wisconsin, serving from 1912 to 1916. Bading also served as US Envoy and an Ambassador Extraordinary to Ecuador from 1922 until his retirement in 1930.

== Biography ==
=== Early years ===
Bading was born August 31, 1870, in Milwaukee, the son of German-born Lutheran pastor John Bading and Brooklyn-born Dorothea (Ehlers) Bading. His father was for 27 years the president of the Evangelical Lutheran Synodical Conference of North America.

Bading attended public schools in Milwaukee through his high school graduation before attending Northwestern College of Watertown, Wisconsin, a small school run by the Wisconsin Evangelical Lutheran Synod and known today as Martin Luther College. Bading did not graduate from this institution, however, deciding to leave school for a year to become a cowboy in Texas.

Bading's stint in the Southwest was brief and he was soon back home in Milwaukee. Bading decided to start a career in medicine and was admitted to Rush Medical College in Chicago, from which he graduated in 1896.

Upon graduation Bading worked for a year as a physician at a Milwaukee hospital. He then moved from practicing medicine to teaching, taking a post as an instructor of surgical pathology at Milwaukee Medical College, a position in which he remained until 1901. For the next four years he worked as an associate in surgery, before moving to the Wisconsin College of Physicians and Surgeons, where he taught as a professor in operative surgery until 1907.

=== Milwaukee politician ===
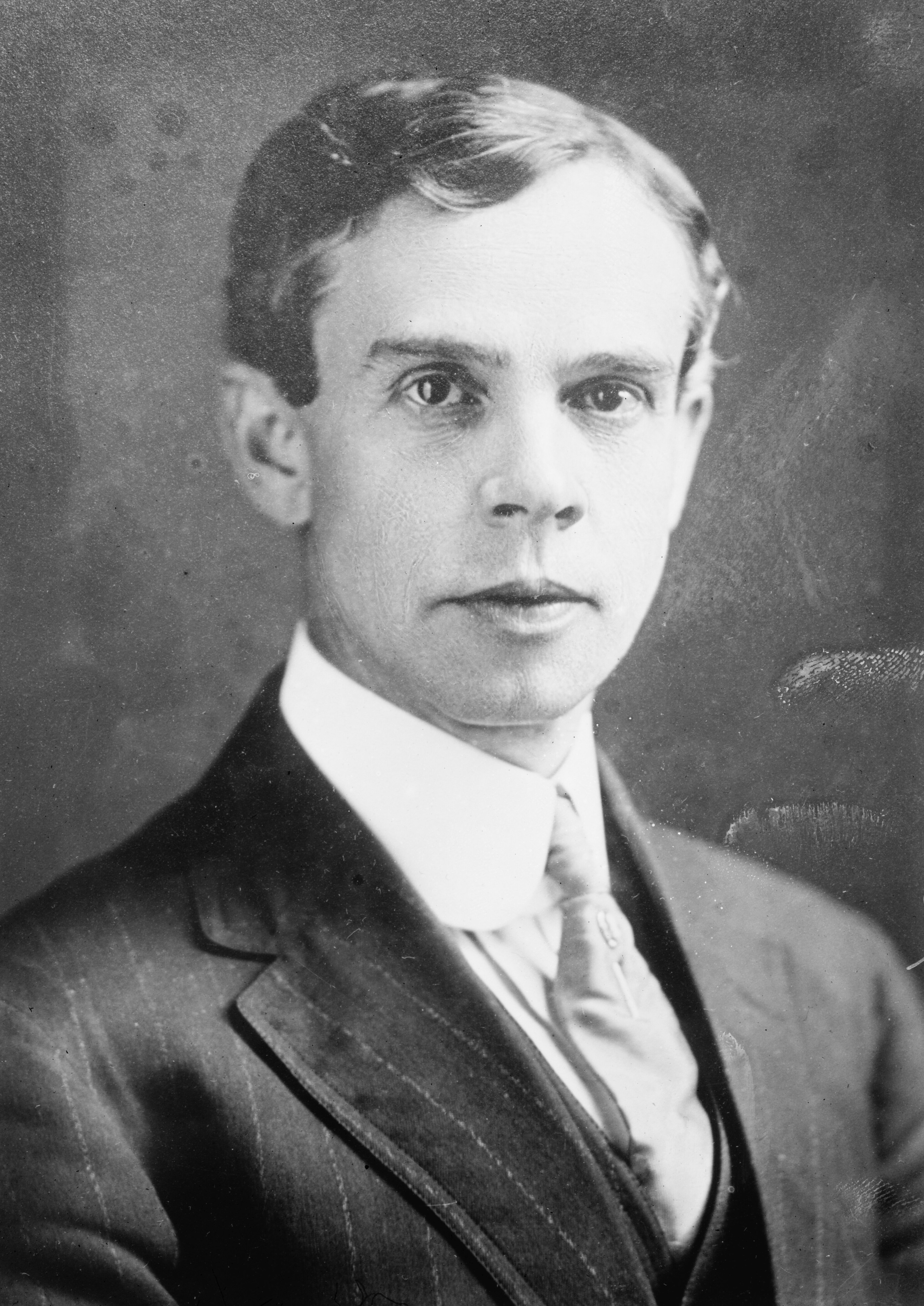
Bading in 1912

In 1906, while he was still a professor of operative surgery, Bading was appointed as Milwaukee's municipal health commissioner. He would remain in that post until 1910, when the new Socialist administration of Emil Seidel won the mayorship. During his time as health commissioner, Bading was credited for establishing tests for bovine tuberculosis among the dairy cattle supplying Milwaukee with milk.

Since Seidel won the 1910 election by a narrow plurality in a three-way race against the candidates of the Republican and Democratic parties, he was seen as a common threat and a beatable opponent by both of these political organizations. In the 1912 election the Republicans and Democrats "fused" their tickets, with both parties jointly nominating Gerhard Bading as their candidate for Mayor of Milwaukee. Bading won election over Seidel, winning the tally of votes over his Socialist rival by a ratio of approximately 4:3. This was the beginning of a tradition of such "nonpartisan" candidacies to defeat the Socialists.

Bading was reelected in 1914, but lost a third reelection bid in the spring of 1916 to city attorney Daniel Hoan, who became Milwaukee's second Socialist mayor.

=== Military and diplomatic career ===
Bading was a supporter of American participation in World War I and enlisted in the U.S. Army to support the war effort. Bading was posted to the Philippine Islands as a military instructor for officer training in sanitation. Bading was later made part of an American expeditionary force to China and Manchuria, in which he served as chief sanitary officer. Bading was discharged from the army in July 1919, ending his military service with the rank of major.

In 1922 Bading was appointed U.S. Envoy Extraordinary and Minister Plenipotentiary to Ecuador by President Warren G. Harding.

In 1925 Bading was named by President Calvin Coolidge as an Ambassador Extraordinary on Special Mission. He was reappointed to this post in 1929 by a third successive Republic President, Herbert Hoover.

Bading retired from the diplomatic service in 1930.

=== Later years ===
During his eight years living in Quito, Ecuador, Bading learned Spanish fluently and took to collecting early South American art. A valuable collection of early religious objects was amassed, featuring 40 carved wooden figurines dating back up to three centuries. The grouping deemed so historically significant that special permission President Isidro Ayora and his cabinet were necessary before the collection was allowed to leave the country. Bading's highly regarded collection of 162 pieces was left to the Milwaukee public museum after his death.

In his last years, Bading's eyesight failed but he retained a keen interest in world events, with his Chicago-born wife, the former Carol Royal Clemmer, keeping him abreast of the news by reading to him.

As a fluent speaker of German, Bading believed that his linguistic skills might be valuable to the American military effort following the outbreak of World War II in 1941. He formally offered his services to the army to assist the war effort, but his help was refused for reasons of age.

=== Death and legacy ===
Bading died on April 11, 1946, at the age of 75. He is buried at Forest Home Cemetery in Milwaukee.

== Footnotes ==
Civic offices
Preceded by Emil Seidel	Mayor of Milwaukee; 1912–1916	Succeeded by Daniel Hoan
Diplomatic posts
Preceded by Charles S. Hartman	United States Envoy to Ecuador; 15 May 1922–1 November 1929	Succeeded by William Dawson
