= 1914 Milwaukee mayoral election =

- April 7, 1914
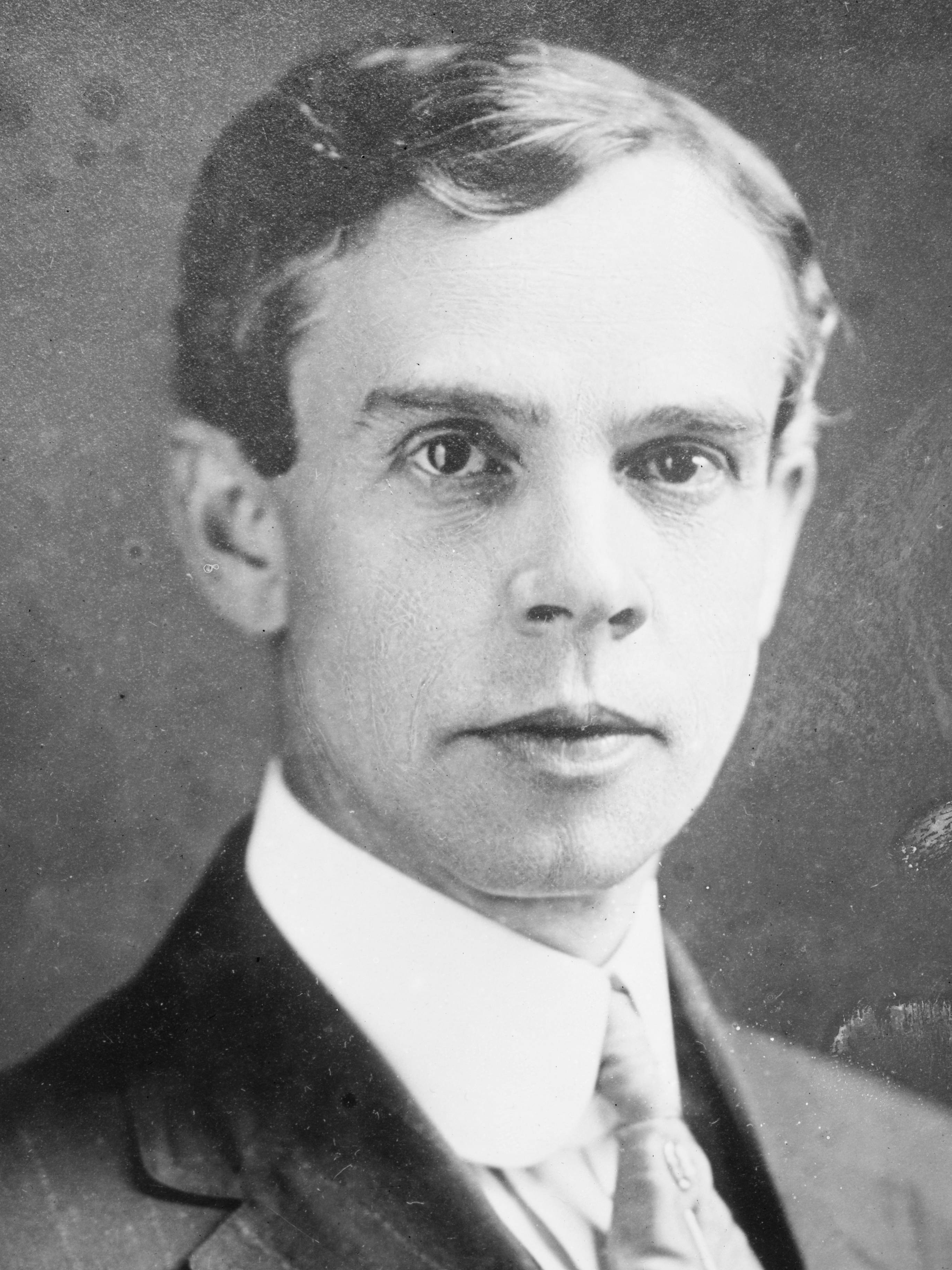

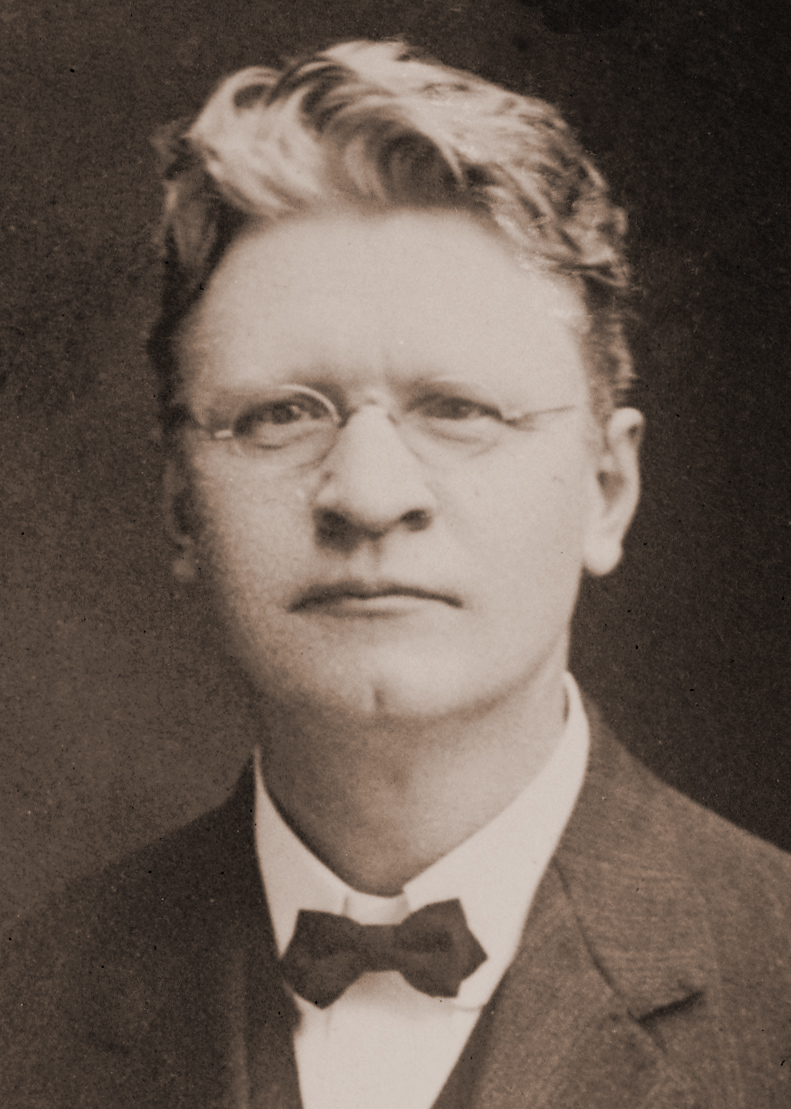
Nominee	Gerhard Adolph Bading	Emil Seidel
Party	Fusion	Social-Democratic
Popular vote	37,701	29,147
Percentage	56.40%	43.60%
Mayor before election
Gerhard Adolph Bading
Fusion
Elected mayor
Gerhard Adolph Bading
Fusion

An election for Mayor of Milwaukee was held on April 7, 1914. Incumbent mayor Gerhard Adolph Bading was re-elected with 56% of the vote in the city's first non-partisan election.

Primary candidates included incumbent mayor Gerhard Adolph Bading, former mayor Emil Seidel, former mayor David S. Rose, and former congressman Theobald Otjen.

== Results ==
Milwaukee mayoral primary election, 1914
Party	Candidate	Votes	%
Social-Democratic	Emil Seidel	21,054	34.26
Fusion	Gerhard A. Bading	20,022	32.58
Democratic	David S. Rose	17,511	28.49
Republican	Theobald Otjen	2,875	4.68
Total votes		61,462	100.00

Milwaukee mayoral general election, 1914
Party	Candidate	Votes	%
Fusion	Gerhard A. Bading	37,701	56.40
Social-Democratic	Emil Seidel	29,147	43.60
Total votes		66,848	100.00
