= 1902 Wisconsin gubernatorial election =

- November 4, 1902
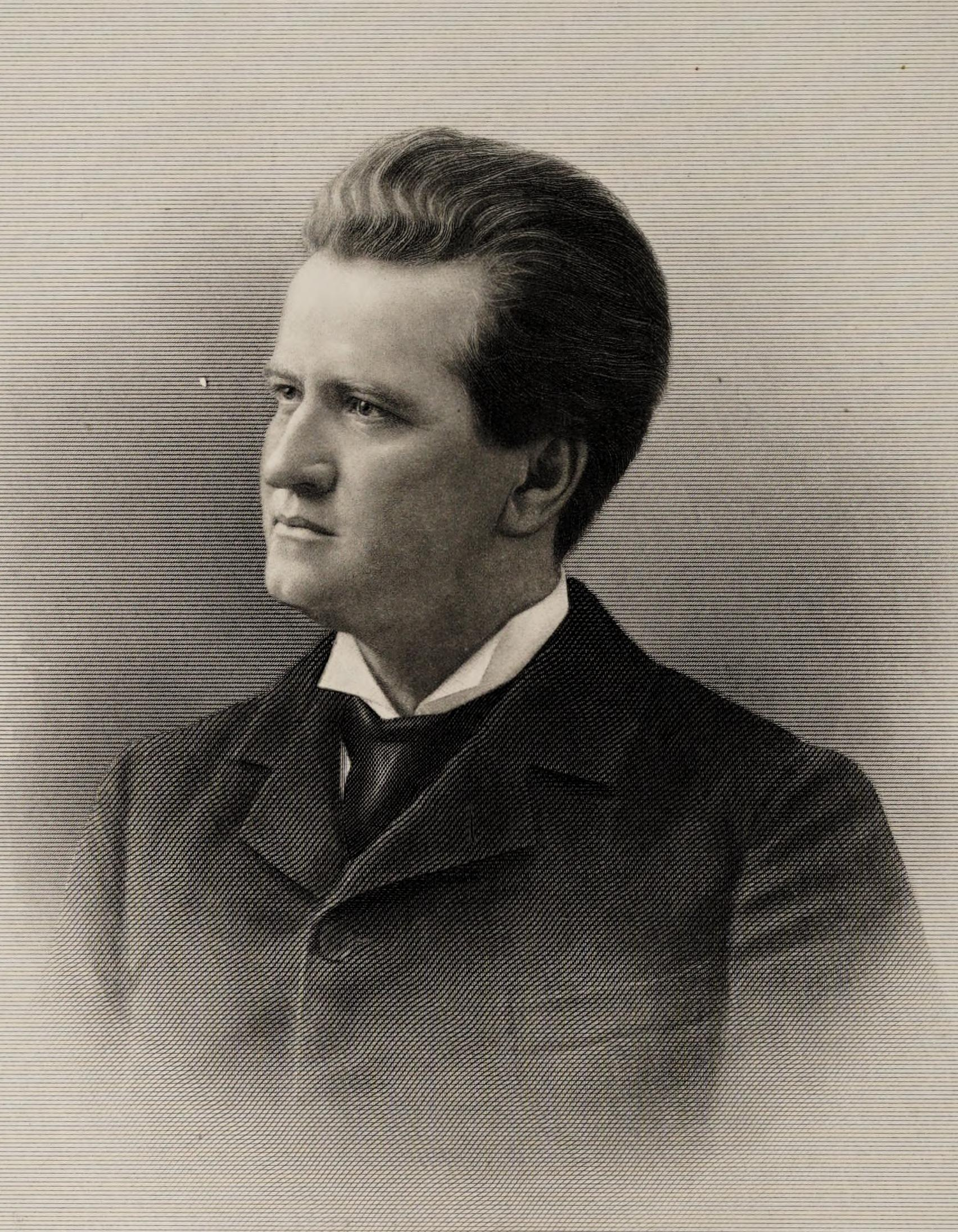

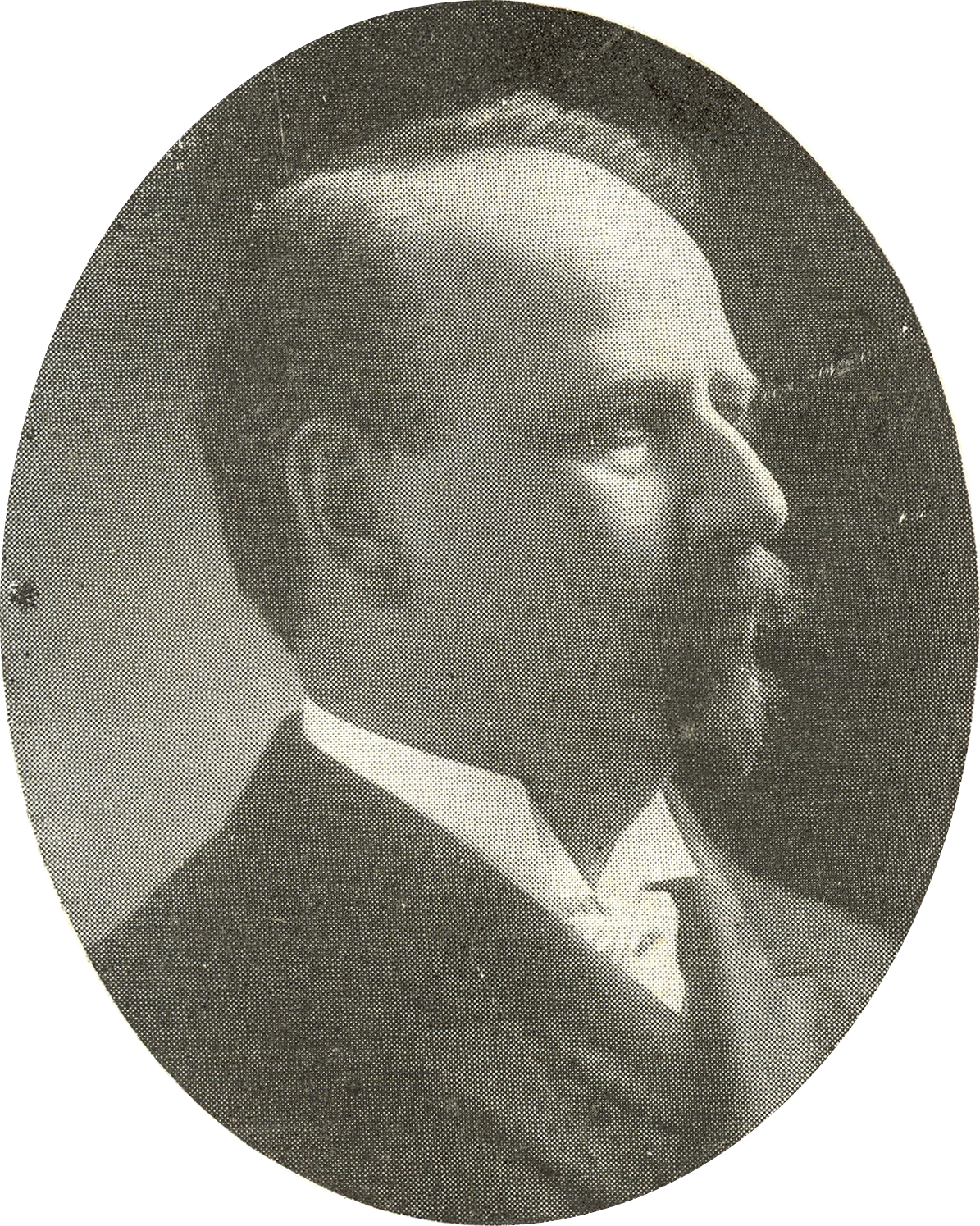
Nominee	Robert M. La Follette	David Stuart Rose
Party	Republican	Democratic
Popular vote	193,417	145,818
Percentage	52.89%	39.88%
- County results La Follette : 40–50% 50–60% 60–70% 70–80% 80–90% Rose : 40–50% 50–60% 60–70%
Governor before election
Robert M. La Follette
Republican
Elected Governor
Robert M. La Follette
Republican

The 1902 Wisconsin gubernatorial election was held on November 4, 1902.

Incumbent Republican Governor Robert M. La Follette defeated Democratic nominee David Stuart Rose with 52.89% of the vote.

Conservative Republican party leaders attempted to deny La Follette renomination in 1902, but La Follette's energized supporters overcame the conservatives and took control of the state convention, implementing a progressive party platform. In the 1902 general election, La Follette decisively defeated the conservative Democratic nominee, Mayor David Stuart Rose of Milwaukee.

In the aftermath of the 1902 election, the state legislature enacted the direct primary (subject to a statewide referendum) and La Follette's tax reform bill. The new tax law, which required railroads to pay taxes based on property owned rather than profits, resulted in railroads paying nearly double the amount of taxes they had paid before the enactment of the law. Having accomplished his first two major goals, La Follette next focused on regulating railroad rates, but the railroads prevented passage of his bill in 1903.

== General election ==
=== Candidates ===
Major party candidates

- David Stuart Rose, Democratic, incumbent Mayor of Milwaukee
- Robert M. La Follette, Republican, incumbent Governor

Other candidates

- Emil Seidel, Social Democratic
- Edwin W. Drake, Prohibition, candidate for Wisconsin State Senate in 1886
- Henry E. D. Puck, Socialist Labor, architect

=== Results ===
1902 Wisconsin gubernatorial election (Note: One must exercise caution using the Blue Book as a source for Wisconsin election data for the period of 1890-1920 as it was unreliable during this period. However, the Blue Book's data for 1902 does match up with the Board of Canvassers reports.)
Party	Candidate	Votes	%	±%
Republican	Robert M. La Follette (inc.)	193,417	52.89%	−6.94%
Democratic	David S. Rose	145,818	39.88%	+3.52%
Social Democratic	Emil Seidel	15,970	4.37%	+2.88%
Prohibition	Edwin W. Drake	9,647	2.64%	+0.44%
Socialist Labor	Henry E. D. Puck	791	0.22%	+0.10%
	Scattering	30	0.01%	
	Blank	3	0.00%	
Majority		47,599	13.02%	
Total votes		365,676	100.00%	
Republican hold		Swing	-10.46%	

=== Results by county ===
This was the first election that Gates (Rusk) County participated in; it would vote for the winning candidate in every gubernatorial election from its establishment in 1901 until 1954.

County	Robert M. La Follette Republican		David S. Rose Democratic		Emil Seidel Social Democratic		Edwin W. Drake Prohibition		Henry E. D. Puck Socialist Labor		Margin		Total votes cast
County	#	%	#	%	#	%	#	%	#	%	#	%	Total votes cast
Adams	1,236	76.20%	338	20.84%	4	0.25%	44	2.71%	0	0.00%	898	55.36%	1,622
Ashland	2,280	54.11%	1,752	41.58%	68	1.61%	109	2.59%	5	0.12%	528	12.53%	4,214
Barron	2,174	72.93%	620	20.80%	34	1.14%	140	4.70%	11	0.37%	1,554	52.13%	2,981 (Note: Includes 2 Scattering votes)
Bayfield	1,892	79.03%	426	17.79%	17	0.71%	53	2.21%	6	0.25%	1,466	61.24%	2,394
Brown	3,654	50.40%	3,283	45.28%	174	2.40%	126	1.74%	13	0.18%	371	5.12%	7,250
Buffalo	1,267	59.23%	826	38.62%	1	0.05%	43	2.01%	2	0.09%	441	20.62%	2,139
Burnett	865	83.01%	90	8.64%	18	1.73%	57	5.47%	12	1.15%	775	74.38%	1,042
Calumet	1,238	45.50%	1,325	48.70%	123	4.52%	30	1.10%	2	0.07%	-87	-3.20%	2,721 (Note: Includes 3 Blank votes)
Chippewa	2,967	63.32%	1,611	34.38%	24	0.51%	84	1.79%	0	0.00%	1,356	28.94%	4,686
Clark	2,577	56.96%	1,729	38.22%	15	0.33%	191	4.22%	12	0.27%	848	18.74%	4,524
Columbia	3,479	58.05%	2,240	37.38%	43	0.72%	229	3.82%	2	0.03%	1,239	20.67%	5,993
Crawford	1,746	51.37%	1,572	46.25%	8	0.24%	73	2.15%	0	0.00%	174	5.12%	3,399
Dane	7,561	51.77%	6,463	44.25%	118	0.81%	449	3.07%	8	0.05%	1,098	7.52%	14,604 (Note: Includes 5 Scattering votes)
Dodge	2,810	33.54%	5,343	63.78%	36	0.43%	186	2.22%	1	0.01%	-2,533	-30.24%	8,377 (Note: Includes 1 Scattering vote)
Door	1,888	70.90%	707	26.55%	11	0.41%	53	1.99%	2	0.08%	1,181	44.35%	2,663
Douglas	2,933	58.62%	1,762	35.22%	109	2.18%	141	2.82%	58	1.16%	1,171	23.41%	5,003
Dunn	1,736	64.66%	817	30.43%	13	0.48%	111	4.13%	7	0.26%	919	34.23%	2,685
Eau Claire	2,762	60.36%	1,597	34.90%	68	1.49%	136	2.97%	13	0.28%	1,165	25.46%	4,576
Florence	267	58.55%	169	37.06%	4	0.88%	15	3.29%	1	0.22%	98	21.49%	456
Fond du Lac	4,443	45.94%	4,903	50.70%	95	0.98%	227	2.35%	2	0.02%	-460	-4.76%	9,671
Forest	484	62.37%	272	35.05%	6	0.77%	14	1.80%	0	0.00%	212	27.32%	776
Gates	573	69.04%	222	26.75%	5	0.60%	29	3.49%	1	0.12%	351	42.29%	830
Grant	4,411	59.80%	2,642	35.82%	32	0.43%	283	3.84%	8	0.11%	1,769	23.98%	7,376
Green	2,231	54.74%	1,602	39.30%	70	1.72%	172	4.22%	1	0.02%	629	15.43%	4,076
Green Lake	1,460	46.59%	1,532	48.88%	37	1.18%	96	3.06%	9	0.29%	-72	-2.30%	3,134
Iowa	2,659	57.16%	1,794	38.56%	9	0.19%	188	4.04%	2	0.04%	865	18.59%	4,652
Iron	1,165	75.45%	348	22.54%	6	0.39%	22	1.42%	3	0.19%	817	52.91%	1,544
Jackson	1,735	72.11%	593	24.65%	13	0.54%	64	2.66%	1	0.04%	1,142	47.46%	2,406
Jefferson	2,492	38.06%	3,843	58.69%	20	0.31%	183	2.79%	10	0.15%	-1,351	-20.63%	6,548
Juneau	2,398	60.94%	1,435	36.47%	24	0.61%	75	1.91%	3	0.08%	963	24.47%	3,935
Kenosha	1,959	45.24%	1,895	43.76%	398	9.19%	68	1.57%	8	0.18%	64	1.48%	4,330
Kewaunee	1,302	42.41%	1,718	55.96%	19	0.62%	29	0.94%	2	0.07%	-416	-13.55%	3,070
La Crosse	3,806	51.34%	3,300	44.51%	65	0.88%	226	3.05%	16	0.22%	506	6.82%	7,414
Lafayette	2,376	51.36%	2,144	46.35%	28	0.61%	78	1.69%	0	0.00%	232	5.02%	4,626
Langlade	1,167	46.92%	1,246	50.10%	15	0.60%	57	2.29%	2	0.08%	-79	-3.18%	2,487
Lincoln	1,992	56.38%	1,412	39.97%	37	1.05%	89	2.52%	3	0.08%	580	16.42%	3,533
Manitowoc	3,584	48.01%	3,376	45.22%	420	5.63%	78	1.04%	7	0.09%	208	2.79%	7,465
Marathon	3,745	49.02%	3,657	47.87%	86	1.13%	129	1.69%	22	0.29%	88	1.15%	7,639
Marinette	2,880	59.20%	1,769	36.36%	22	0.45%	181	3.72%	13	0.27%	1,111	22.84%	4,865
Marquette	1,266	52.75%	1,045	43.54%	6	0.25%	82	3.42%	0	0.00%	221	9.21%	2,400
Milwaukee	26,787	43.80%	22,403	36.63%	10,881	17.79%	766	1.25%	327	0.53%	4,384	7.17%	61,164
Monroe	2,693	56.29%	1,912	39.97%	9	0.19%	169	3.53%	1	0.02%	781	16.33%	4,784
Oconto	2,097	54.74%	1,619	42.26%	18	0.47%	92	2.40%	5	0.13%	478	12.48%	3,831
Oneida	1,154	60.93%	670	35.37%	21	1.11%	49	2.59%	0	0.00%	484	25.55%	1,894
Outagamie	3,806	51.41%	3,287	44.40%	116	1.57%	192	2.59%	2	0.03%	519	7.01%	7,403
Ozaukee	977	35.89%	1,677	61.61%	44	1.62%	21	0.77%	3	0.11%	-700	-25.72%	2,722
Pepin	611	62.67%	341	34.97%	2	0.21%	20	2.05%	1	0.10%	270	27.69%	975
Pierce	1,315	58.29%	765	33.91%	22	0.98%	152	6.74%	2	0.09%	550	24.38%	2,256
Polk	1,386	78.97%	215	12.25%	74	4.22%	60	3.42%	20	1.14%	1,171	66.72%	1,755
Portage	2,601	50.02%	2,459	47.29%	23	0.44%	117	2.25%	0	0.00%	142	2.73%	5,200
Price	1,087	54.43%	773	38.71%	33	1.65%	96	4.81%	8	0.40%	314	15.72%	1,997
Racine	4,452	50.41%	3,824	43.30%	249	2.82%	263	2.98%	44	0.50%	628	7.11%	8,832
Richland	2,080	54.59%	1,419	37.24%	13	0.34%	296	7.77%	2	0.05%	661	17.35%	3,810
Rock	5,078	58.23%	3,146	36.08%	120	1.38%	361	4.14%	10	0.11%	1,932	22.16%	8,720
Sauk	2,775	54.07%	2,085	40.63%	19	0.37%	248	4.83%	3	0.06%	690	13.45%	5,132
Sawyer	578	53.87%	467	43.52%	13	1.21%	15	1.40%	0	0.00%	111	10.34%	1,073
Shawano	2,298	60.63%	1,393	36.75%	18	0.47%	77	2.03%	4	0.11%	905	23.88%	3,790
Sheboygan	4,460	45.87%	3,731	38.37%	1,358	13.97%	142	1.46%	32	0.33%	729	7.50%	9,723
St. Croix	2,408	52.95%	1,886	41.47%	86	1.89%	159	3.50%	9	0.20%	522	11.48%	4,548
Taylor	1,026	47.72%	1,050	48.84%	17	0.79%	51	2.37%	4	0.19%	-24	-1.12%	2,150
Trempealeau	2,141	76.93%	519	18.65%	4	0.14%	116	4.17%	3	0.11%	16,22	58.28%	2,783
Vernon	3,439	78.21%	759	17.26%	23	0.52%	176	4.00%	0	0.00%	2,680	60.95%	4,397
Vilas	760	58.06%	516	39.42%	7	0.53%	25	1.91%	1	0.08%	244	18.64%	1,309
Walworth	2,838	60.98%	1,488	31.97%	53	1.14%	272	5.84%	2	0.04%	1,350	29.01%	4,654
Washburn	644	69.32%	252	27.13%	8	0.86%	22	2.37%	3	0.32%	392	42.20%	929
Washington	2,140	46.94%	2,327	51.04%	30	0.66%	59	1.29%	3	0.07%	-187	-4.10%	4,559
Waukesha	3,799	52.55%	3,091	42.76%	103	1.42%	230	3.18%	6	0.08%	708	9.79%	7,229
Waupaca	3,489	72.57%	1,030	21.42%	40	0.83%	247	5.14%	1	0.02%	2,459	51.14%	4,808
Waushara	2,107	74.77%	565	20.05%	13	0.46%	126	4.47%	5	0.18%	1,542	54.72%	2,818
Winnebago	6,191	53.88%	4,811	41.87%	184	1.60%	289	2.52%	15	0.13%	1,380	12.01%	11,490
Wood	2,740	56.67%	1,920	39.71%	68	1.41%	99	2.05%	7	0.14%	820	16.96%	4,835
Total	193,417	52.89%	145,818	39.88%	15,970	4.37%	9,647	2.64%	791	0.22%	47,599	13.02%	365,676

==== Counties that flipped from Republican to Democratic ====
- Fond du Lac
- Green Lake
- Langlade
- Taylor
- Washington

== Bibliography ==
- Glashan, Roy R. (1979). American Governors and Gubernatorial Elections, 1775-1978. Meckler Books. ISBN 0-930466-17-9.
- Gubernatorial Elections, 1787-1997. Washington, D.C.: Congressional Quarterly Inc. 1998. ISBN 1-56802-396-0.
- Erickson, Halford, ed. (1903). The Blue Book of the State of Wisconsin. Milwaukee: Northwestern Litho. Co.
