= 1912 Milwaukee mayoral election =

- April 2, 1912
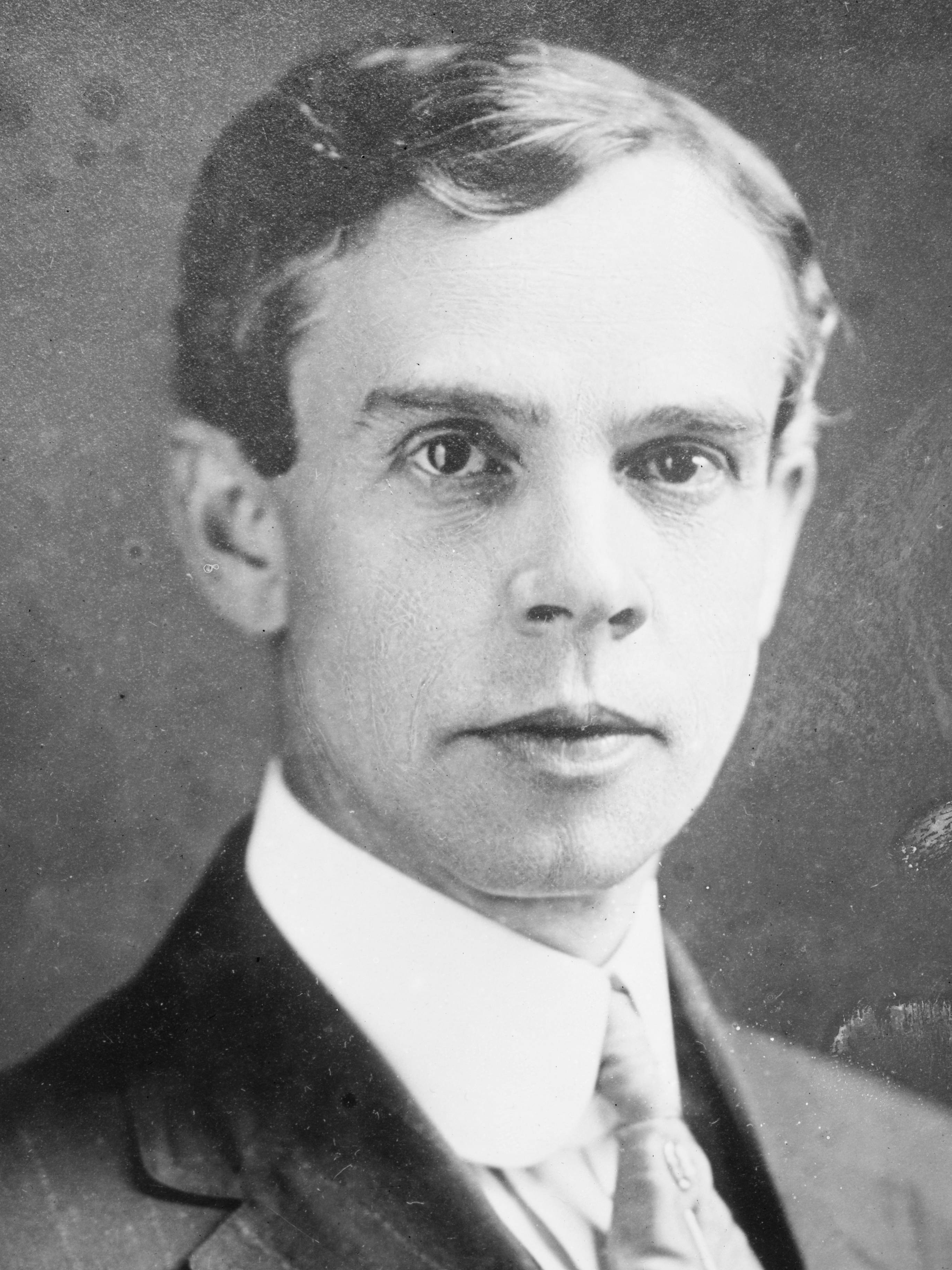

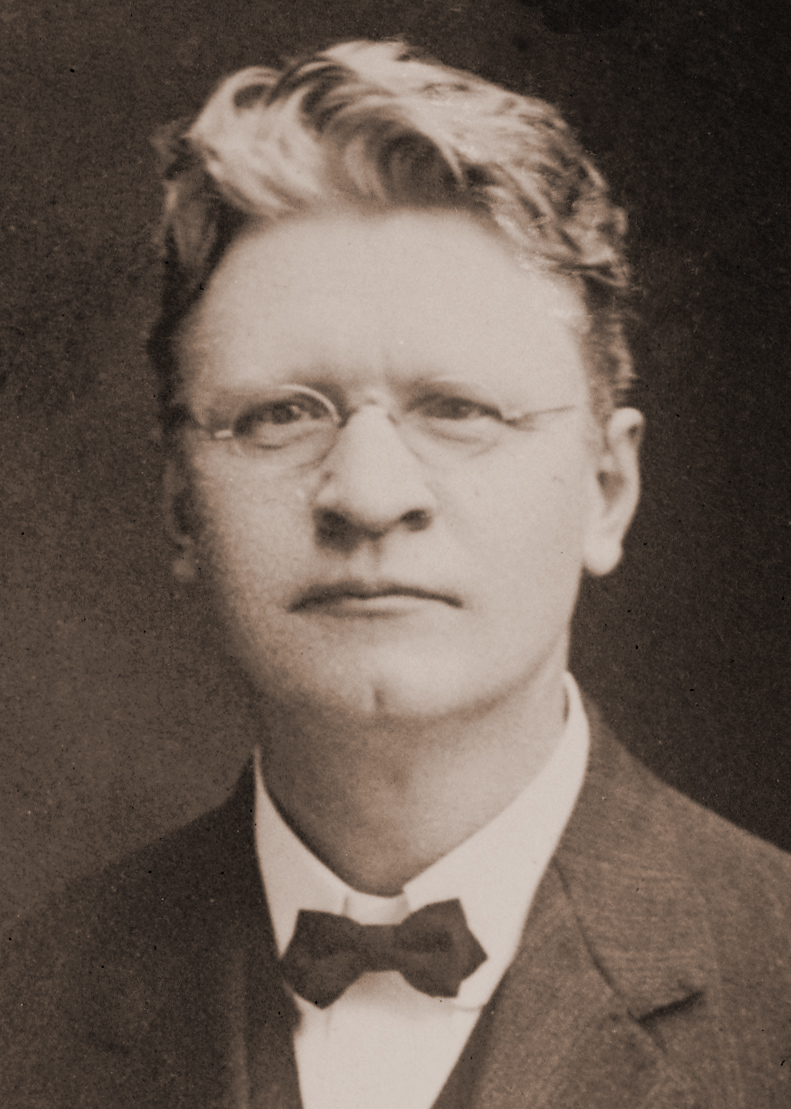
Nominee	Gerhard Adolph Bading	Emil Seidel
Party	Fusion	Social-Democratic
Popular vote	43,064	30,200
Percentage	57.9%	40.6%
Mayor before election
Emil Seidel
Social-Democratic
Elected mayor
Gerhard Adolph Bading
Fusion

An election for Mayor of Milwaukee was held on April 2, 1912. Incumbent mayor Emil Seidel was defeated for re-election by Democratic-Republican Fusion candidate Gerhard Adolph Bading, who won 58% of the vote. Bading was sworn in on April 17, 1912.

Candidates included Milwaukee mayor Emil Seidel, former Milwaukee health commissioner Gerhard Adolph Bading, and Prohibitionist Ivan D. Mishoff.

== Results ==
Milwaukee mayoral election, 1912
Party	Candidate	Votes	%
Fusion	Gerhard A. Bading	43,064	57.9
Social-Democratic	Emil Seidel	30,200	40.6
Prohibition	Ivan D. Mishoff	1,062	1.4
Total votes		74,326	100.00
