= Emil Seidel =

American politician (1864–1947)

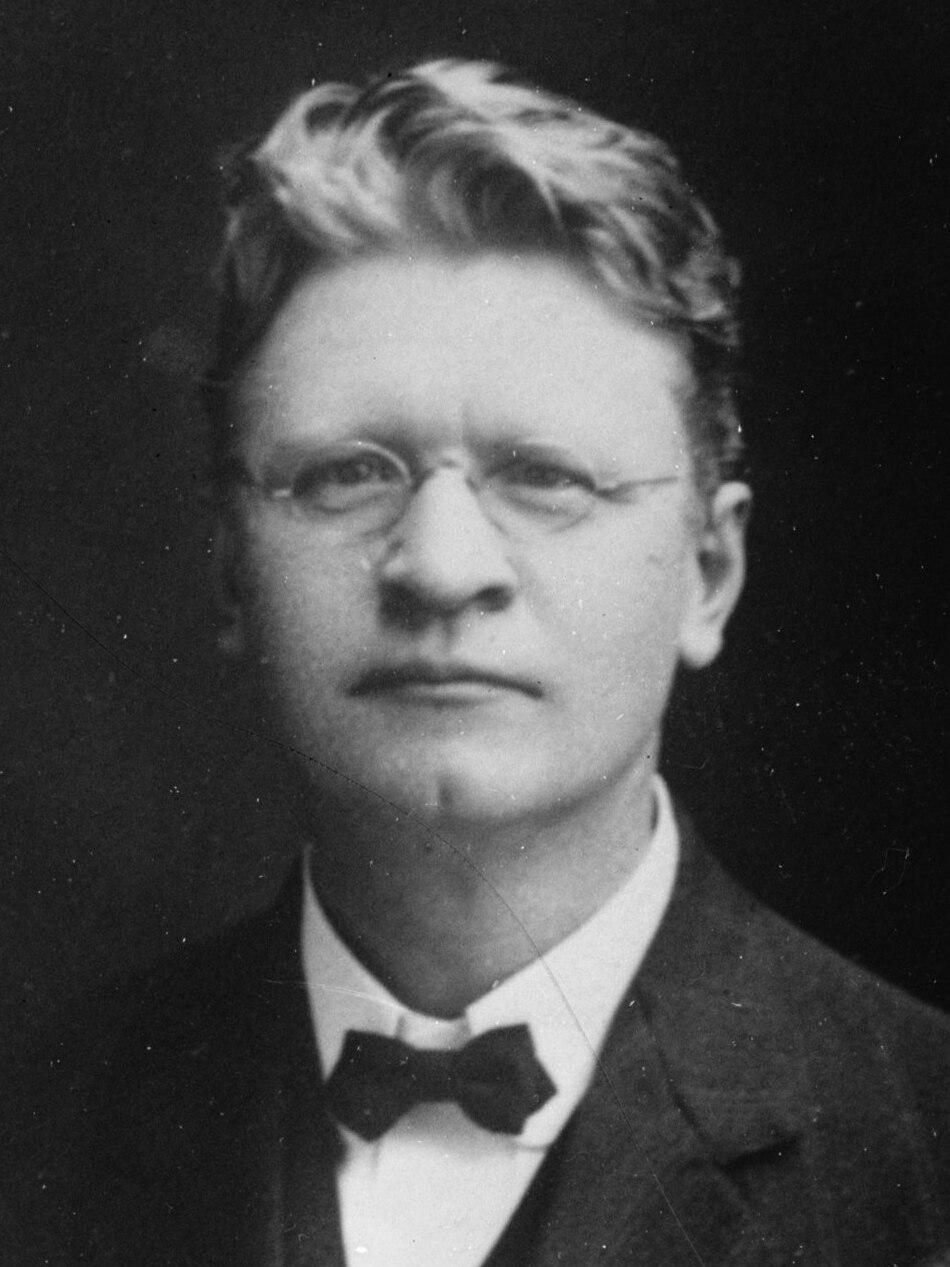
- Seidel c. 1910–1912

36th Mayor of Milwaukee
- In office April 19, 1910 – April 17, 1912
- Preceded by: David Rose
- Succeeded by: Gerhard Adolph Bading

Member of the Milwaukee Common Council
- In office April 1916 – April 1920
- Constituency: at-large
- In office April 1909 – April 1910
- Constituency: at-large
- In office April 1904 – April 1908
- Constituency: 20th ward

Personal details
- Born: December 13, 1864 Ashland, Pennsylvania, U.S.
- Died: June 24, 1947 (aged 82) Milwaukee, Wisconsin, U.S.
- Party: Socialist
- Spouse: Lucy Geissel (m. 1895; div. 1924)
- Children: 2
- Occupation: Woodworker, patternmaker

Emil Seidel (December 13, 1864 – June 24, 1947) was an American woodworker, patternmaker and politician. Seidel was the mayor of Milwaukee from 1910 to 1912. The first Socialist mayor of a major city in the United States, Seidel became the vice presidential candidate for the Socialist Party of America in the 1912 presidential election.

== Early years ==
Seidel was born December 13, 1864, in the town of Ashland in Schuylkill County, Pennsylvania, the son of ethnic German emigrants from Pomerania. His family moved to Wisconsin in 1867, living first in Prairie du Chien before moving to the state capital of Madison. Seidel's father, Otto Seidel, was a carpenter, and his mother, Henrietta Knoll Seidel, was a homemaker.

Seidel attended public school up to the age of 13, when he dropped out to become a woodcarver. He continued to study after leaving school, reading extensively. At the age of 19 he started a trade union of local woodworkers, becoming the organization's first secretary.

At the age of 22, Seidel went abroad to refine his skills as a woodcarver. He lived for six years in Berlin, working at his trade during the day and attending school at night. It was in this period that Seidel first became an active socialist.

In 1895, Seidel married Lucy Geissel. They had one son, Lucius, who died in infancy, and one daughter, Viola. The pair would ultimately divorce in 1924.

== Early political involvement ==
When Seidel returned to the United States in 1892 he joined the Socialist Labor Party of America. Seidel was a charter member of the first SLP branch in Milwaukee. He also became an active member of the Pattern Makers Union. Emil Seidel was also a member of Milwaukee’s Turner movement and took part in activities at Turner Hall.

Seidel later joined the Social Democracy of America (established 1897), the Social Democratic Party of America (established 1898), and the Socialist Party of America (established 1901) in turn. He resided briefly in Washington state, serving as the first secretary of Local Redmond SPA in the fall of 1901.

== First and second Common Council tenures (1904–1908; 1909–1910) ==
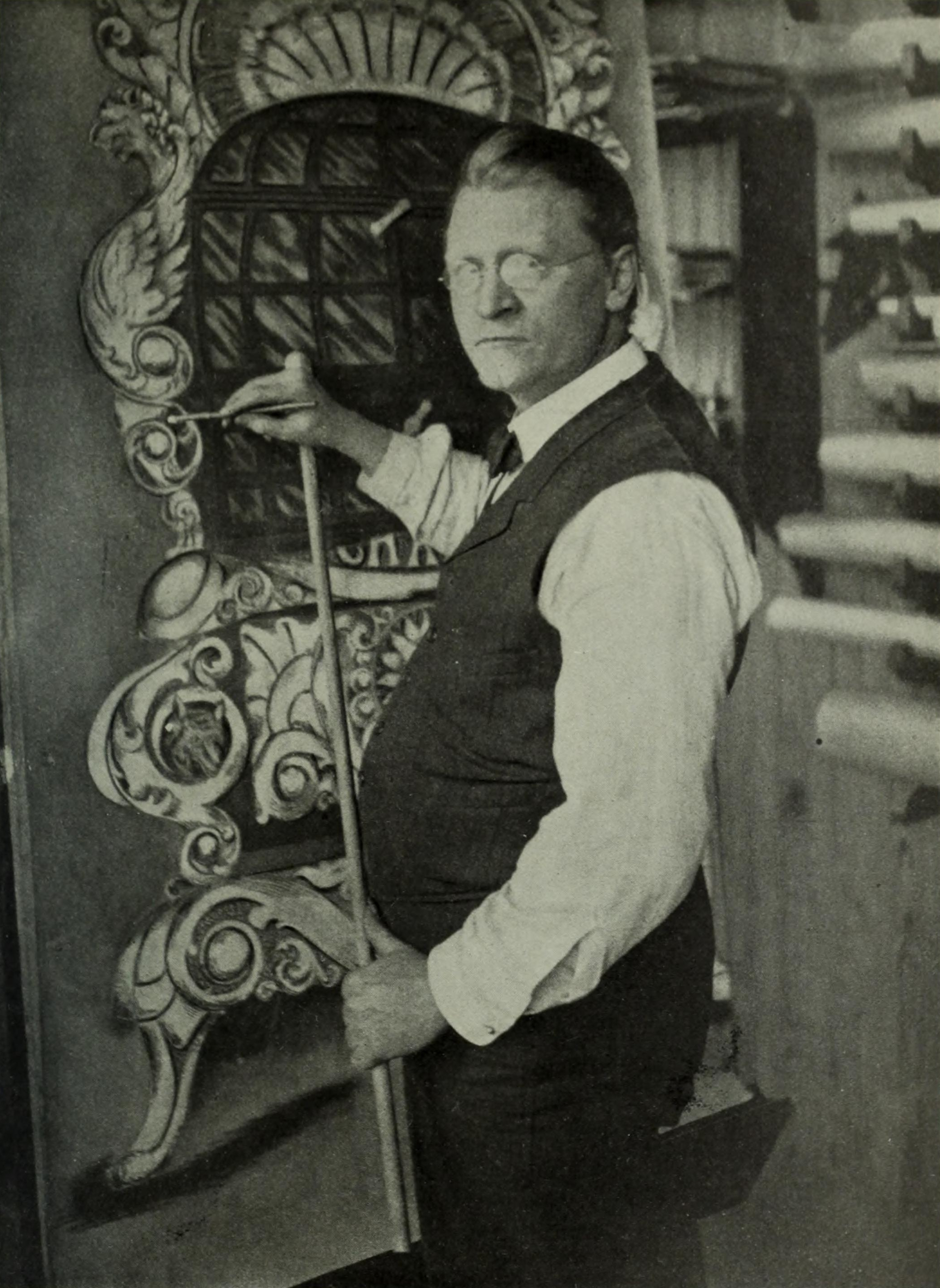
Seidel working as a patternmaker in 1910

In 1904 Seidel was one of nine Socialists to win electoral victory as Milwaukee city aldermen on the Milwaukee Common Council (city council), being elected in the city's 20th ward. In the first year of the new council term, the nine Socialists collectively introduced 318 measures, and in their second year they introduced 349. Seidel served two consecutive terms as 20th ward alderman before making his first mayoral run in 1908. After losing this mayoral race, Seidel successfully won election to an at-large seat on the Milwaukee Common Council in 1909.

== Mayoralty (1910–1912) ==
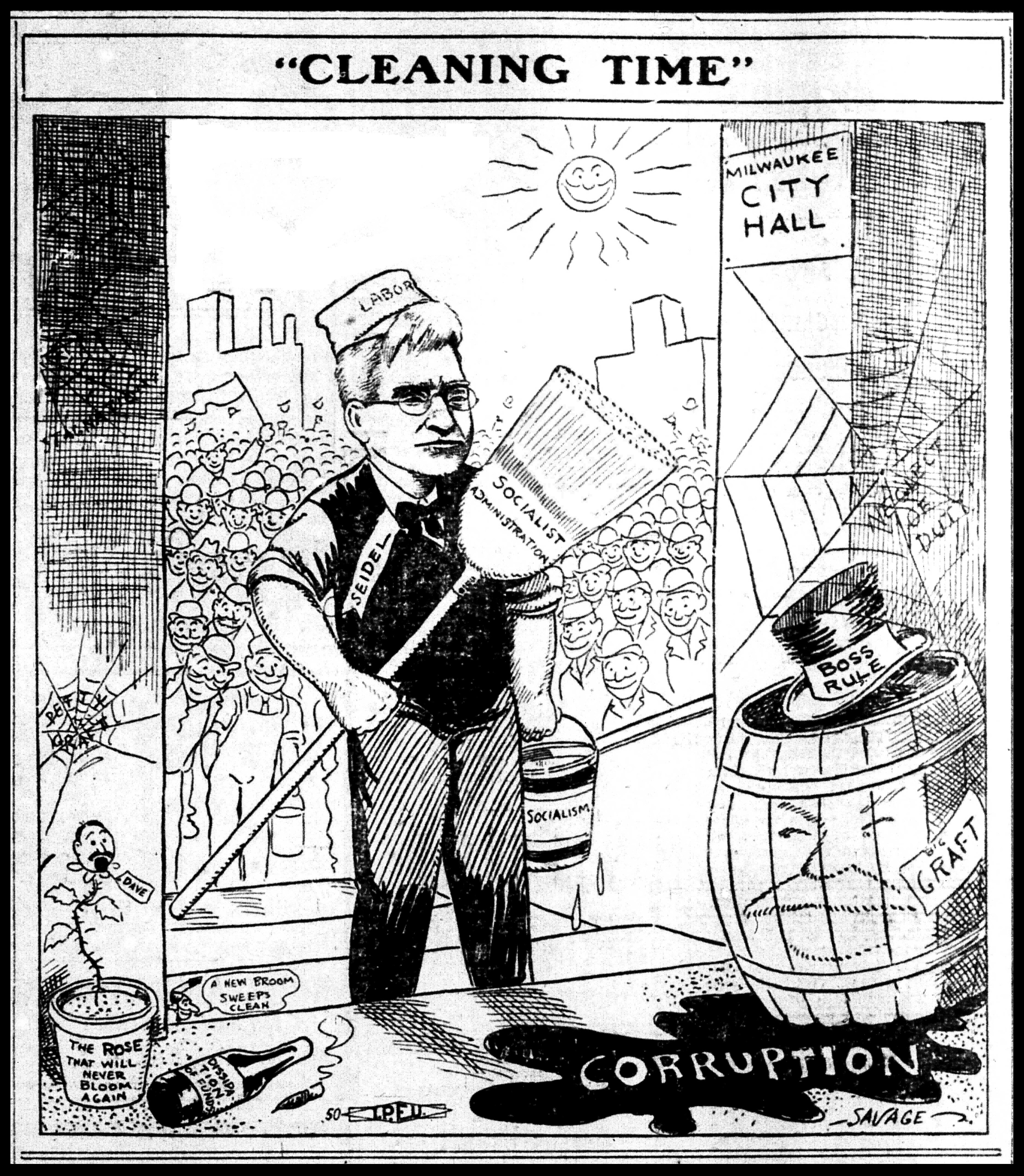
New Milwaukee mayor Emil Seidel celebrated in an April 1910 editorial cartoon from the socialist press.

In 1910, Seidel was elected mayor of Milwaukee, becoming the first Socialist mayor of a major city in the United States. During his administration the first public works department was established, the first fire and police commission was organized, and a city park system was established. Seidel enforced strict regulation of bars and the closing of brothels and sporting parlors (modern-day casinos). During his administration Seidel employed the American poet and author Carl Sandburg as his personal secretary. Seidel's socialist inclinations had attracted Sandburg to Milwaukee.

In his Spring 1912 bid for re-election, Seidel faced the combined forces of the Democratic and Republican parties, who ran a single candidate in order to defeat Seidel and the Socialists. Despite winning more votes in 1912 than in 1910, Seidel was defeated by Gerhard Bading, local doctor, professor of surgery, and commissioner of health, on a fusion Democratic-Republican ticket.

== 1912 vice presidential candidacy ==
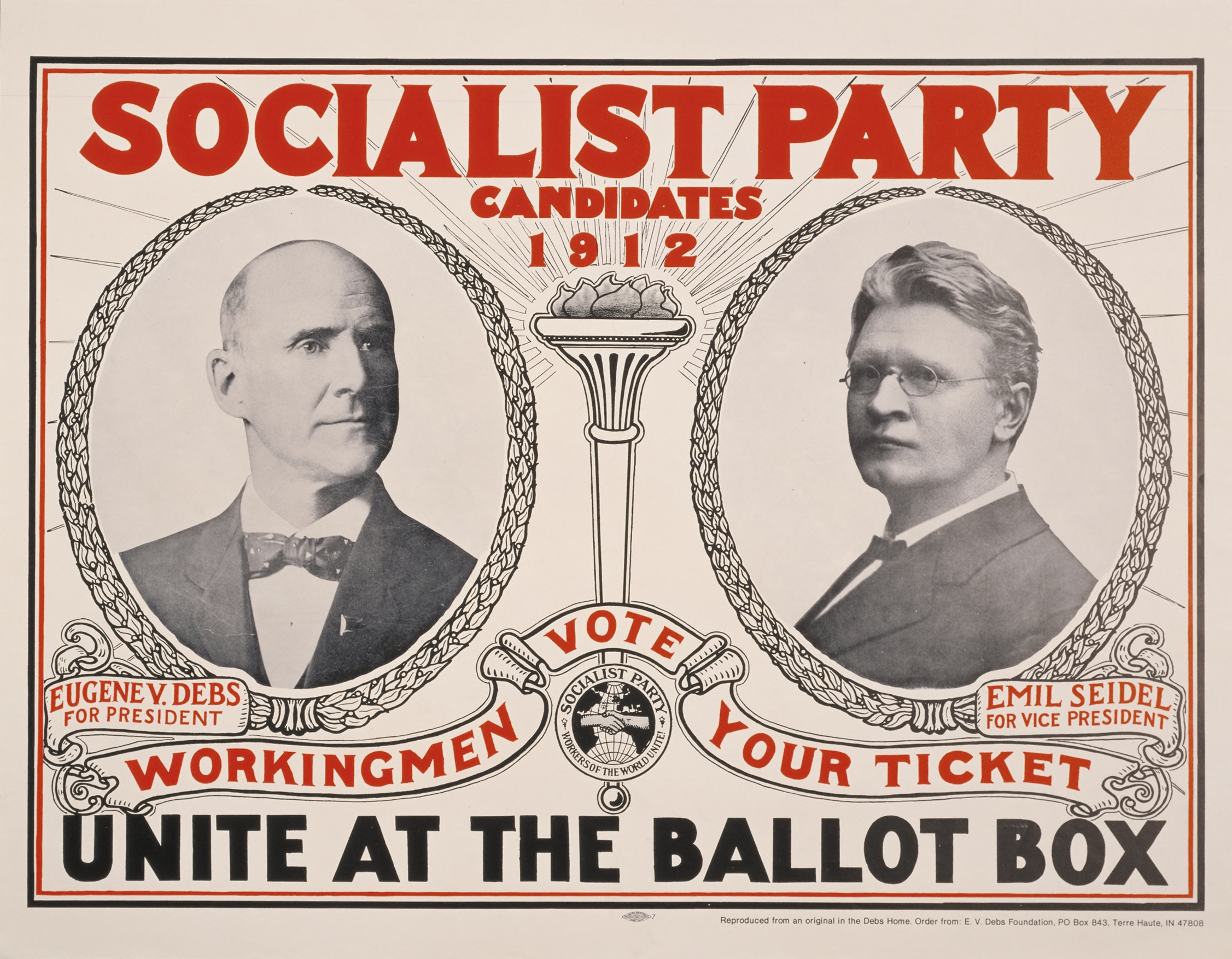
Campaign poster from the 1912 presidential campaign, where Seidel ran as Eugene V. Debs's running mate

Freed of his mayoral duties by electoral defeat, Seidel became a logical choice as the Socialist Party's nominee for Vice President of the United States on the ticket with Eugene V. Debs. The pair won 901,551 votes in the 1912 presidential election, 6% of the total vote.

== Third Common Council tenure (1916–1920) ==
Seidel tried to regain election as mayor of Milwaukee in 1914, but was soundly defeated. He returned to the Milwaukee Common Council in 1916 after winning election to an at-large aldermanic seat. He won re-election as an alderman in 1918, and remained in office until 1920.

Seidel, an opponent of World War I, voted against Milwaukee's purchase of Liberty bonds to help finance the war effort. He also was an outspoken opponent of a proposed Milwaukee "loyalty ordinance". In the superheated wartime political climate, marked by political repression of the anti-war movement, Seidel ran afoul of the law when he was arrested on November 12, 1917, in Horicon, Wisconsin following a speech he made there. Charged with "tending to provoke an assault or breach of peace during an address", he was fined $50.

== Fourth Common Council tenure (1932–1936) ==
He served a final four-year stint as a Milwaukee city alderman from 1932 until 1936. In 1932, Seidel ran for a seat in the United States Senate from Wisconsin, winning 6% of the vote Seidel was a Wisconsin delegate at the 1932 Socialist National Convention, which was held in Milwaukee.

== Later years ==
Seidel retired from political life in the mid-1930s. He remained a resident of Milwaukee, living on the northwest side of the city, passing his time painting, composing music, creating poetry, and writing his autobiography.

== Death and legacy ==
Seidel died in Milwaukee on June 24, 1947, following an illness of several months' duration related to complications from a heart condition. He was 82 years old. Seidel was cremated and his ashes were buried with his wife at the Lincoln Memorial Cemetery. His grave was unmarked for 70 years until 2017 when a marker was placed.

Seidel's unpublished memoirs reside in Madison at the Wisconsin Historical Society, where they are available to scholars on microfilm.

== See also ==
- List of elected socialist mayors in the United States
- Daniel Hoan, Milwaukee's second Socialist mayor
- Frank P. Zeidler, a Socialist Party member who served as mayor of Milwaukee
- Social-Democratic Party of Wisconsin

== Works ==
- What We Have Done in Milwaukee. Chicago, IL: National Office of the Socialist Party, 1911.
- Which Must Go? America or Private Ownership of Railroads? Milwaukee: Socialist Party of Wisconsin, 1923.
- Thy Kingdom Come: Sketches from My Life: Autobiography of Emil Seidel. [1944] Madison, WI: State Historical Society of Wisconsin.
- Joining the Socialist Movement. Corvallis, OR: 1000 Flowers Publishing, 2013.
- Building the Social Democratic Party. Corvallis, OR: 1000 Flowers Publishing, 2013.

Political offices
Preceded by David Rose	Mayor of Milwaukee; 1910–1912	Succeeded by Gerhard A. Bading
Party political offices
Preceded by Ben Hanford	Socialist nominee for Vice President of the United States; 1912	Succeeded by Kirk Kirkpatrick
