= 1898 Milwaukee mayoral election =

- April 5, 1898
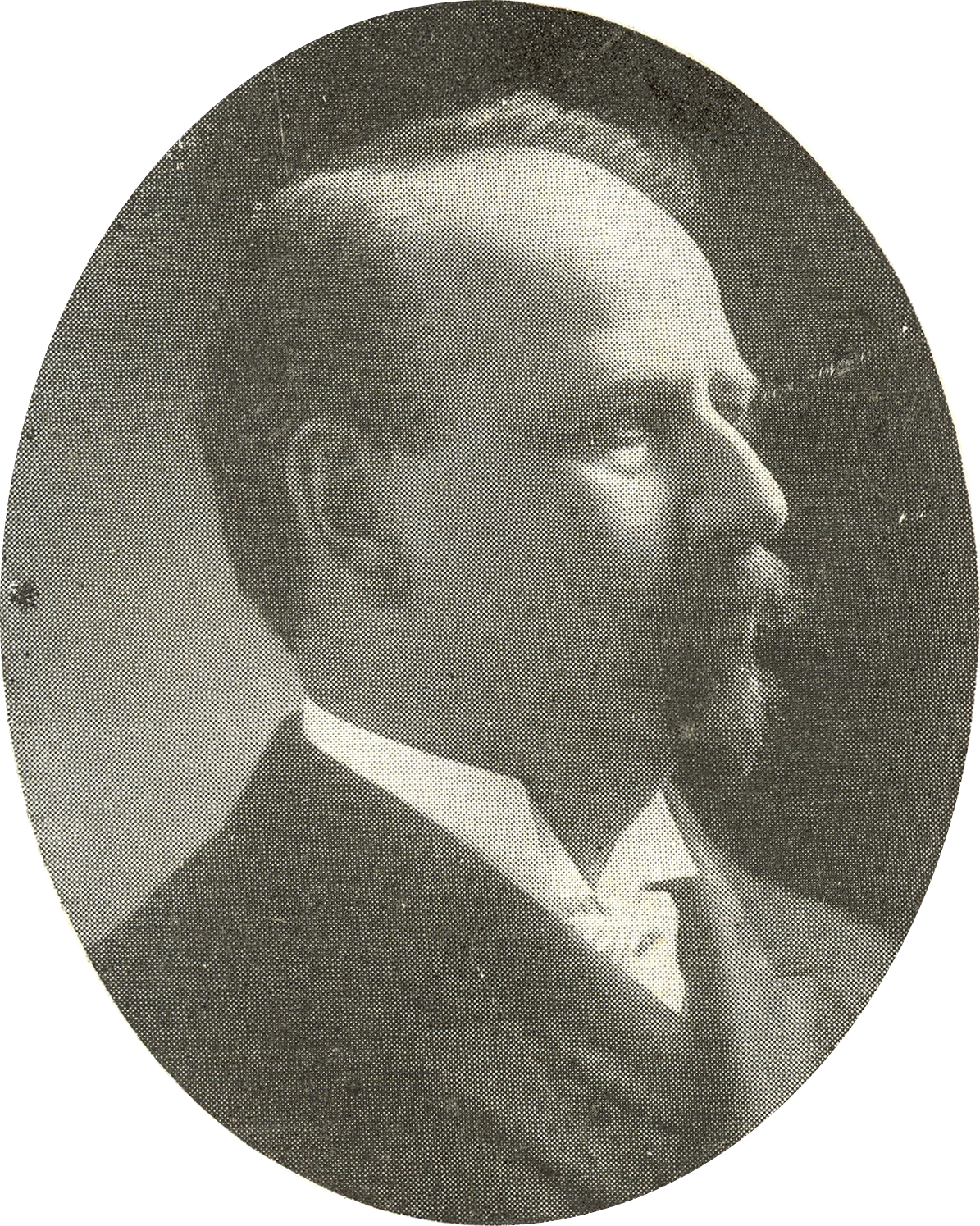

Nominee	David S. Rose	William Geuder	Robert Meister
Party	Democratic	Republican	Social-Democratic
Alliance	Populist
Popular vote	~26,000	~18,000	~2,400
Percentage	~56.03%	~38.79%	~5.17%
Mayor before election
William C. Rauschenberger
Republican
Elected mayor
David S. Rose
Democratic

An election for Mayor of Milwaukee was held on April 5, 1898. David S. Rose was elected with 56% of the vote.

Candidates included Democratic-Populist attorney David S. Rose, Republican businessman William Geuder, and Social Democrat Robert Meister.

== Results ==
Milwaukee mayoral election, 1898
Party	Candidate	Votes	%
Democratic	David S. Rose	~26,000	~56.03
Republican	William Geuder	~18,000	~38.79
Social-Democratic	Robert Meister	~2,400	~5.17
Total votes		~46,400	100.00
