= 1916 Milwaukee mayoral election =

- April 4, 1916
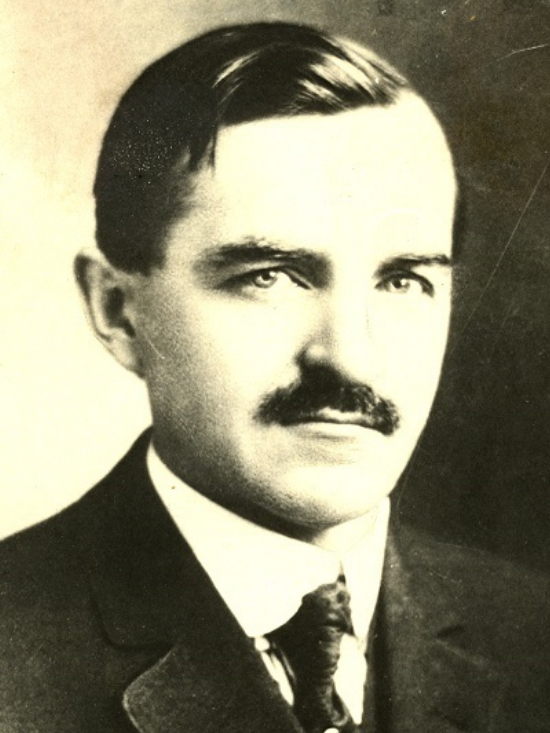

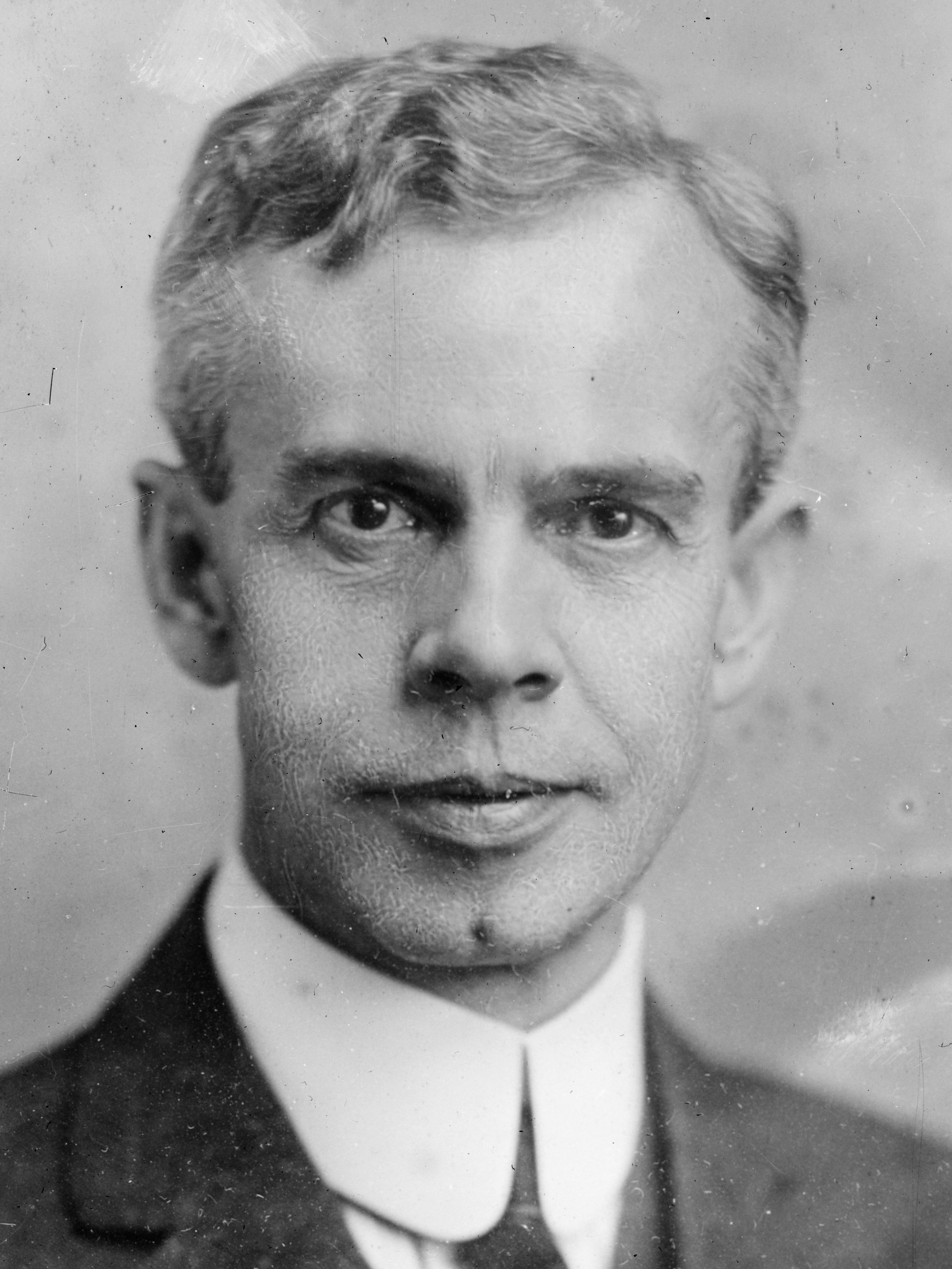
Nominee	Daniel Hoan	Gerhard Adolph Bading
Party	Social-Democratic	Fusion
Popular vote	32,493	30,623
Percentage	51.48%	48.52%
Mayor before election
Gerhard Adolph Bading
Fusion
Elected mayor
Daniel Hoan
Social-Democratic

An election for Mayor of Milwaukee was held on April 4, 1916. Incumbent mayor Gerhard Adolph Bading was defeated for re-election by Social-Democratic city attorney Daniel Hoan, who won with 51% of the vote.

== Results ==
Milwaukee mayoral election, 1916
Party	Candidate	Votes	%
Social-Democratic	Daniel Hoan	32,493	51.48
Fusion	Gerhard Adolph Bading	30,623	48.52
Total votes		63,116	100.00
