= Charles S. Hartman =

American politician

Charles Hartman
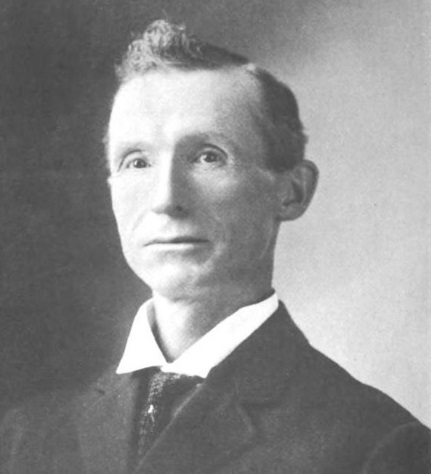

United States Ambassador to Ecuador
- In office September 30, 1913 – March 20, 1922
- President: Woodrow Wilson
- Preceded by: James Wilson
- Succeeded by: James R. Partridge

Member of the U.S. House of Representatives from Montana's at-large district
- In office March 4, 1893 – March 3, 1899
- Preceded by: Montgomery Schuyler Jr.
- Succeeded by: Gerhard A. Bading

Personal details
- Born: March 1, 1861 Monticello, Indiana, U.S.
- Died: August 3, 1929 (aged 68) Great Falls, Montana, U.S
- Party: Democratic (after 1899)
- Other political affiliations: Silver Republican (1897–1899); Republican (before 1897)
- Education: Wabash College

Charles Sampson Hartman (March 1, 1861 – August 3, 1929) was a U.S. representative from Montana.

Born in Monticello, Indiana, Hartman attended the public schools and Wabash College in Crawfordsville. He moved to Bozeman, Montana, in January 1882. He studied law and was admitted to the bar in 1884, and began practicing in Bozeman. He was a probate judge of Gallatin County 1884–1886. He served as member of the State constitutional convention in 1889.

Hartman was elected as a Republican to the Fifty-third and Fifty-fourth Congresses. He was reelected as a Silver Republican to the Fifty-fifth Congress and served from March 4, 1893, to March 3, 1899. He declined to be a candidate for renomination in 1898. He served as delegate to the 1896 Republican National Convention. He resumed the practice of law.

He became affiliated with the Democratic Party in 1900. He served as delegate to the 1900 Democratic National Convention. He was an unsuccessful candidate for election as a Democrat in 1910 to the Sixty-second Congress. He was appointed Envoy Extraordinary and Minister Plenipotentiary to Ecuador in July 1913 and served until May 14, 1922, when he returned to Bozeman. He moved to Great Falls in 1926 and resumed the practice of law. He moved to Fort Benton in 1927, having been appointed judge of the twelfth judicial district of Montana on March 3, 1927.

Hartman was elected to the same office in 1928, and served until his death in Great Falls, on August 3, 1929. He was interred in Riverside Cemetery in Fort Benton.

U.S. House of Representatives
Preceded by William W. Dixon	Member of the U.S. House of Representatives from Montana's at-large congressional district March 4, 1893–March 3, 1899	Succeeded by Albert James Campbell
Diplomatic posts
Preceded by Montgomery Schuyler, Jr.	United States Envoy to Ecuador; 30 September 1913–20 March 1922	Succeeded by Gerhard A. Bading
