= Sherburn M. Becker =

American politician in Wisconsin (1876–1949)

Sherburn Merrill Becker
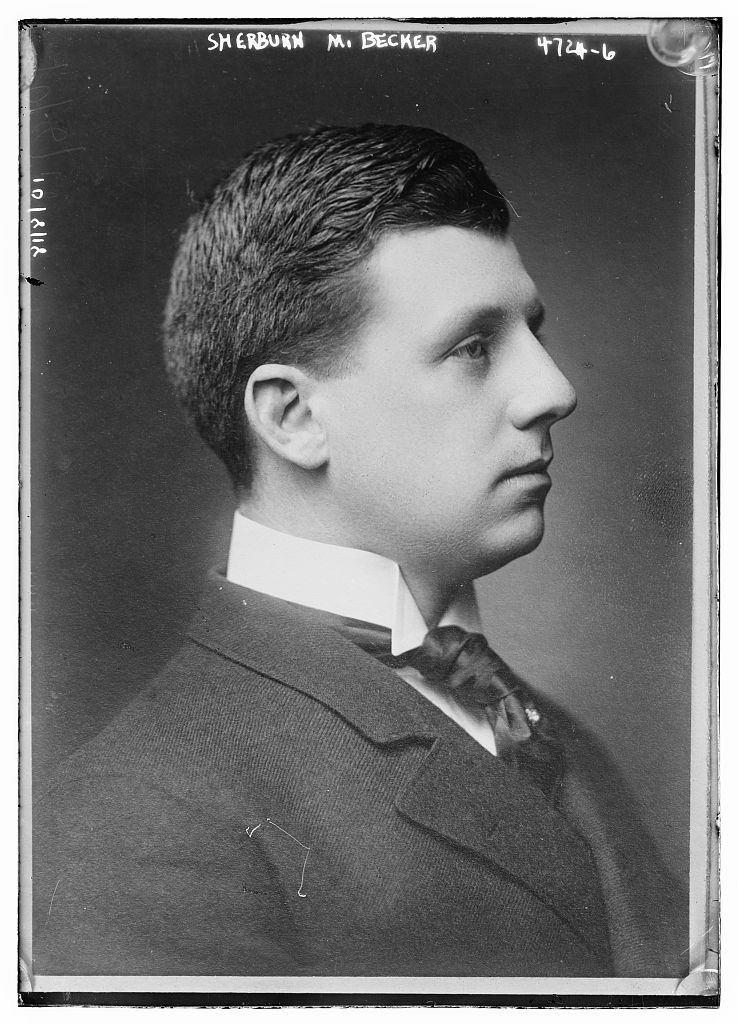

34th Mayor of Milwaukee
- In office 1906–1908
- Preceded by: David Rose
- Succeeded by: David Rose

Personal details
- Born: November 13, 1876 Milwaukee, Wisconsin, U.S.
- Died: February 5, 1949 (aged 72) New York, U.S.
- Party: Republican
- Spouse: Irene B. Smith (m. 1898)
- Education: Harvard Law School

Sherburn Merrill Becker (November 13, 1876 – February 5, 1949) was an American politician in Wisconsin and the 34th mayor of Milwaukee. He was the last Republican to hold this office.

== Biography ==
Sherburn Merrill Becker was born in Milwaukee, Wisconsin, on November 13, 1876. He was the only child of Washington Becker, a New York lawyer and president of Marine National Bank, and Sarah Worthing Merrill. Becker went on to attend Harvard Law School. Just before graduating at age 22, he married Irene B. Smith in Milwaukee on December 12, 1898. Becker served on the Milwaukee Common Council and on the Milwaukee County Board of Supervisors. He was elected mayor of Milwaukee in 1906, defeating four-term incumbent David Rose. Only 29 years old at the time, Becker was popularly known as the "boy mayor". He served only one two-year term and chose not to run for office again in 1908. Becker later moved to New York City to work in the financial market by purchasing a seat on the New York Stock Exchange. He retired in 1937, moving to a 2,000 acre dairy farm in upstate New York where he died on February 5, 1949, at age 72. His body was returned to Milwaukee and interred at Forest Home Cemetery.

On November 21, 1906, as mayor of Milwaukee, Becker attended the Packy McFarland versus Kid Herman boxing bout at the Davenport Coliseum in Iowa. He traveled by special train leaving from Chicago's La Salle Station to Davenport at 1PM. He was accompanied by a "Dr. Krohn" and several others.

In 1906 Mayor Becker ordered the city's street clocks removed officially claiming they obstructed sidewalks. Allegedly Mayor Becker thought they made his city look old fashioned and he wanted to project a more modern image for the city. When the businesses that owned the clocks failed to comply with Mayor Becker's order Becker had the Milwaukee Fire Department destroy clocks on Grand Avenue, (now Wisconsin Avenue) the city's main street.

Political offices
Preceded by David S. Rose	Mayor of Milwaukee; 1906–1908	Succeeded by David S. Rose
