= Lincoln Memorial Cemetery =

Lincoln Memorial Cemetery may refer to:

- Lincoln Memorial Park, Miami, Florida
- Lincoln Memorial Cemetery (Suitland, Maryland)
