= 1906 Milwaukee mayoral election =

- April 3, 1906
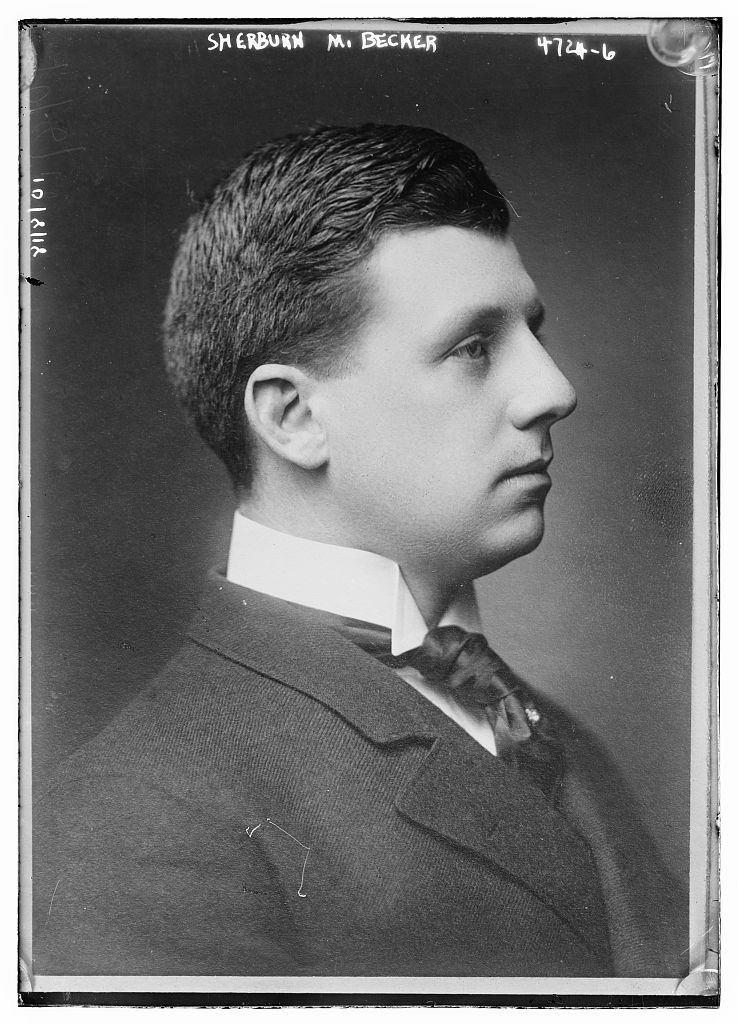

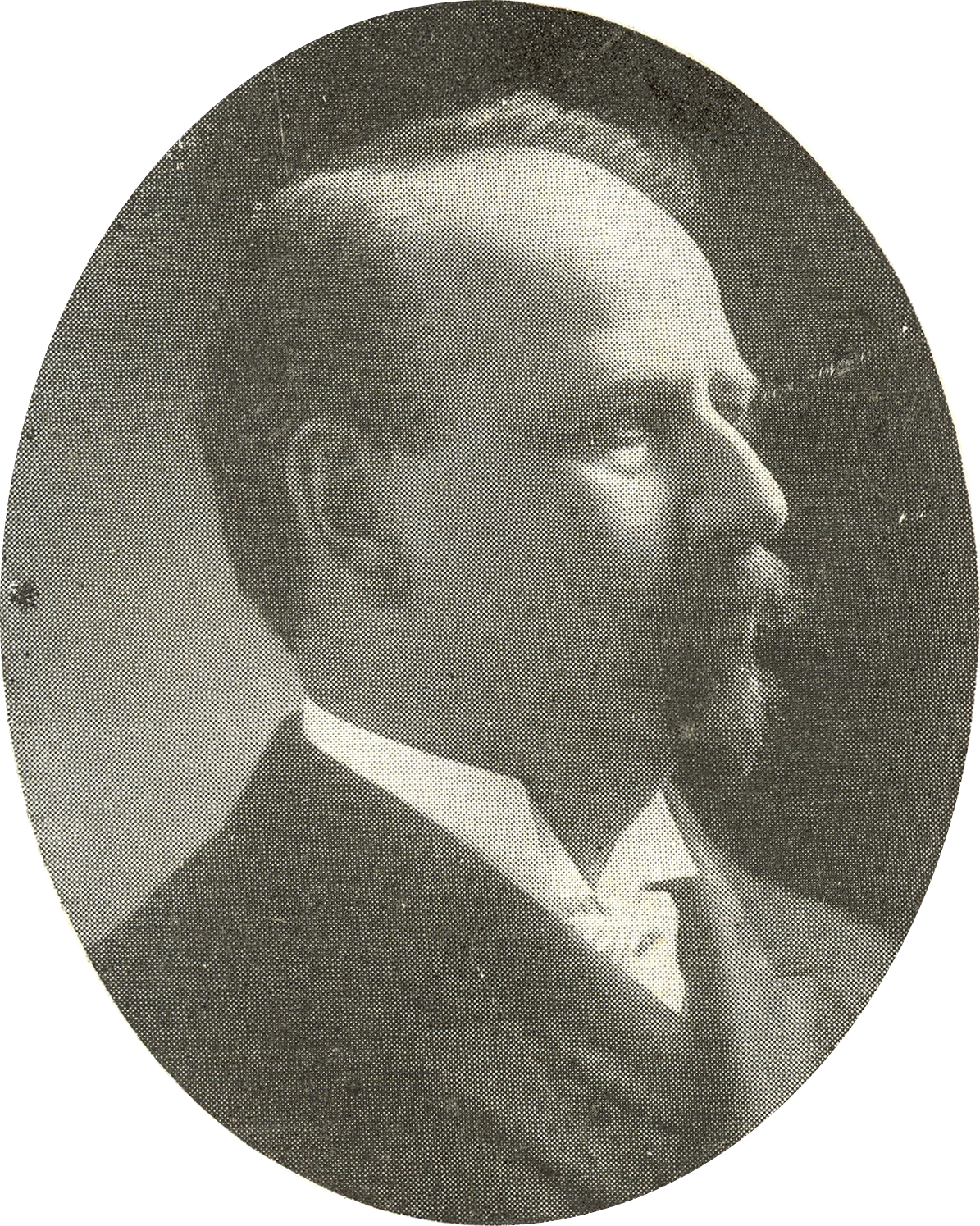

Nominee	Sherburn M. Becker	David S. Rose	William A. Arnold
Party	Republican	Democratic	Social-Democratic
Popular vote	22,565	21,010	16,720
Percentage	37.42%	34.85%	27.73%
Mayor before election
David S. Rose
Democratic
Elected mayor
Sherburn M. Becker
Republican

An election for Mayor of Milwaukee was held on April 3, 1906. Sherburn M. Becker was elected with 37% of the vote.

Candidates included Milwaukee alderman Sherburn M. Becker, incumbent mayor David S. Rose, and Social Democrat William A. Arnold.

As of 2025, this is the last time a Republican was elected Mayor of Milwaukee.

== Results ==
Milwaukee mayoral election, 1906
Party	Candidate	Votes	%
Republican	Sherburn M. Becker	22,565	37.42
Democratic	David S. Rose	21,010	34.85
Social-Democratic	William A. Arnold	16,720	27.73
Total votes		60,295	100.00
