= David Stuart Rose =

American lawyer (1856–1932)

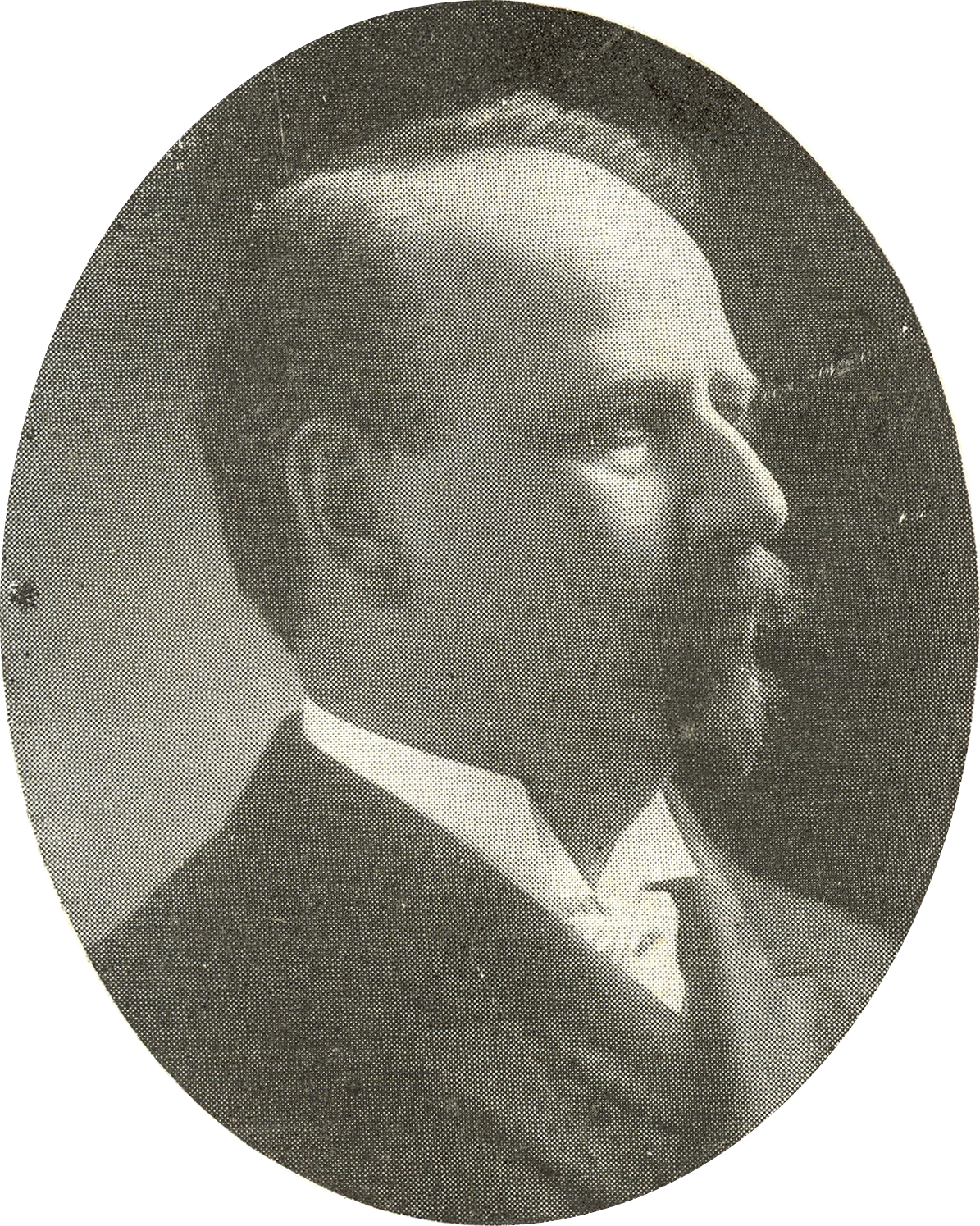
- Rose c. 1906

35th Mayor of Milwaukee
- In office 1908–1910
- Preceded by: Sherburn M. Becker
- Succeeded by: Emil Seidel
- In office 1898–1906
- Preceded by: William C. Rauschenberger
- Succeeded by: Sherburn M. Becker

Personal details
- Born: June 30, 1856 Darlington, Wisconsin, U.S.
- Died: August 8, 1932 (aged 76) Milwaukee, Wisconsin, U.S.
- Party: Democrat
- Occupation: Lawyer, politician

David Stuart Rose (June 30, 1856 – August 8, 1932) was an American lawyer and Democratic politician.

== Background ==
Born in Darlington, Wisconsin, Rose joined his father's law firm in Darlington. He served as mayor of Darlington in 1883 and 1884 and was county judge of Lafayette County, Wisconsin.

== Move to Milwaukee ==
In 1886, he moved to Milwaukee where he practiced law and was twice elected mayor of the city of Milwaukee, Wisconsin serving from 1898 to 1906 and from 1908 to 1910. His successor as the Democratic candidate, V. J. Schoenecker, was defeated by Socialist Emil Seidel. Rose was the 1902 Democratic nominee for Governor of Wisconsin, running a conservative campaign losing to incumbent Robert M. La Follette by a wide margin.

His administration was known for widespread corruption. Under "All the Time Rosy", Milwaukee had a reputation as a "wide-open" town that tolerated prostitution, gambling and late-night saloons. As historian John Gurda put it, "Virtually everything that was not nailed down - from public hay supplies to aldermanic votes - was for sale to the highest bidder." After spending some time in California trying to promote trade with China, Rose returned to Milwaukee and ran once again for mayor in 1924 but lost the election to Socialist Daniel Hoan.

== Back to Lafayette County ==
Rose later returned to Darlington and in 1931 ran once more (unsuccessfully) for county judge of Lafayette County. He died in Milwaukee on August 8, 1932, and is buried in Darlington.

== See also ==
- Twin Buttes, Arizona

== Notes ==
Party political offices
Preceded by Louis G. Bomrich	Democratic nominee for Governor of Wisconsin; 1902	Succeeded by George Wilbur Peck
Political offices
Preceded by William C. Rauschenberger	Mayor of Milwaukee; 1898–1906	Succeeded by Sherburn M. Becker
Preceded by Sherburn M. Becker	Mayor of Milwaukee; 1908–1910	Succeeded by Emil Seidel
