= 1910 Milwaukee mayoral election =

- April 5, 1910
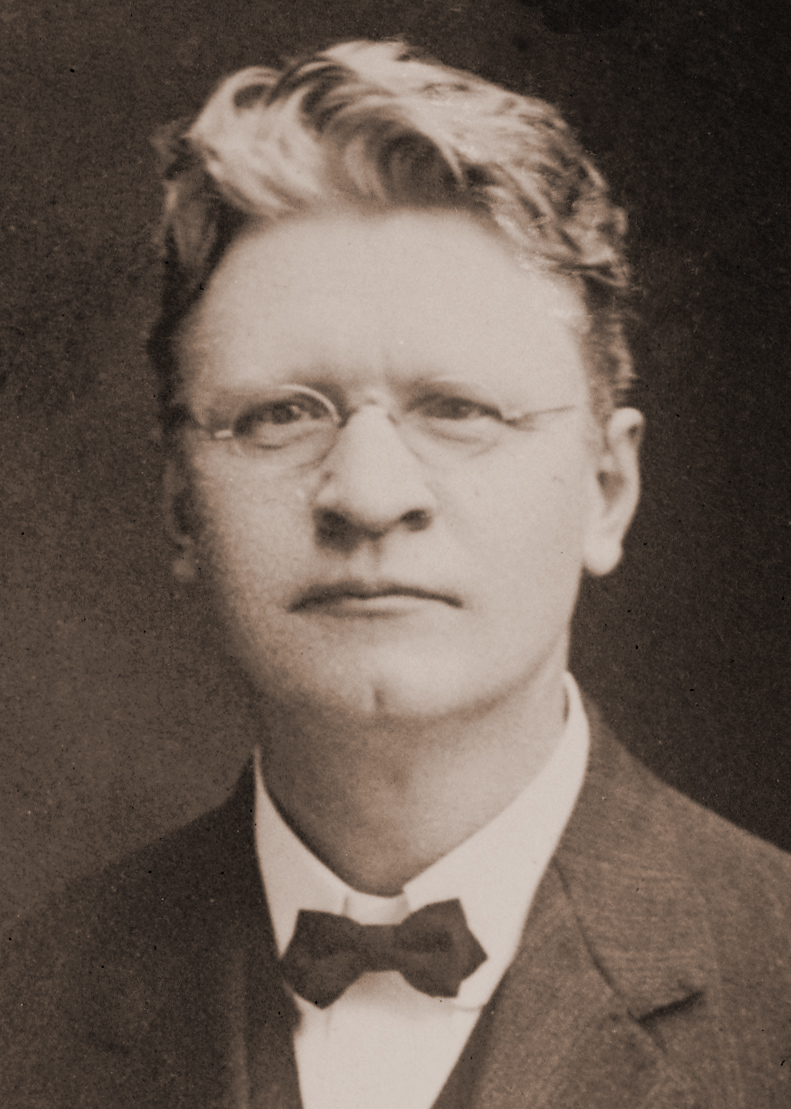

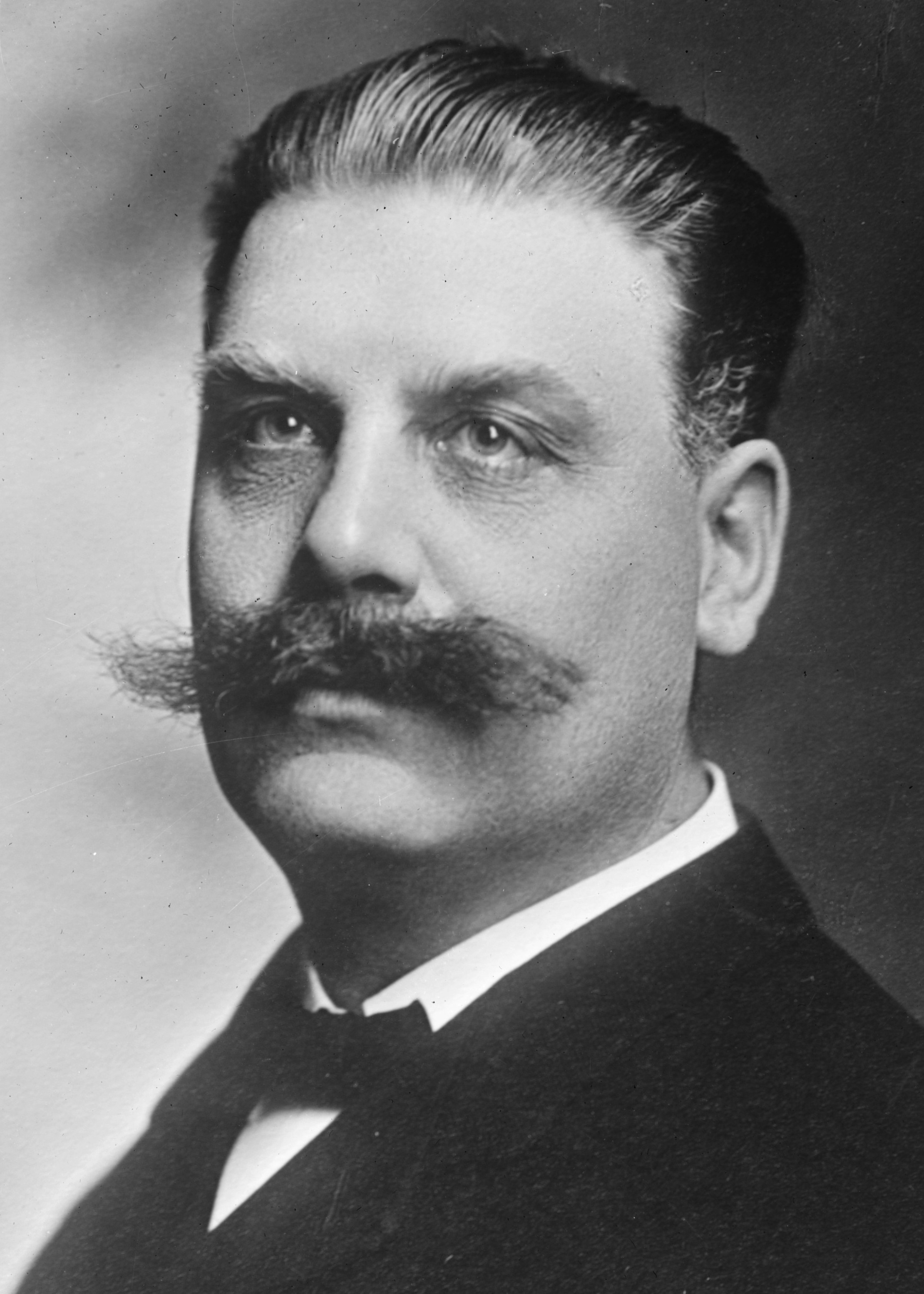

Nominee	Emil Seidel	V. J. Schoenecker	J. M. Beffel
Party	Social-Democratic	Democratic	Republican
Popular vote	27,622	20,513	11,262
Percentage	46.5%	34.5%	19.0%
Mayor before election
David S. Rose
Democratic
Elected mayor
Emil Seidel
Social-Democratic

An election for Mayor of Milwaukee was held on April 5, 1910. Emil Seidel was elected with 46% of the vote. He was sworn in on April 19, 1910.

Candidates included Milwaukee city alderman Emil Seidel, Milwaukee city comptroller Vincenz J. Schoenecker, and physician John M. Beffel.

== Background ==
Seidel's victory came amid a Socialist Party wave election year in Milwaukee and Wisconsin fueled by public outrage towards political corruption. 1912 also saw 21 aldermen and 14 state legislators from the Socialist Party elected to office; as well as the election of Victor L. Berger as the first socialist member of the U.S. House of Representatives.

== Results ==
Milwaukee mayoral election, 1910
Party	Candidate	Votes	%
Social-Democratic	Emil Seidel	27,622	46.5
Democratic	V. J. Schoenecker	20,513	34.5
Republican	J. M. Beffel	11,262	19.0
Total votes		59,397	100.00
